= Chlodwigplatz station =

Railway station in Cologne, Germany

Chlodwigplatz
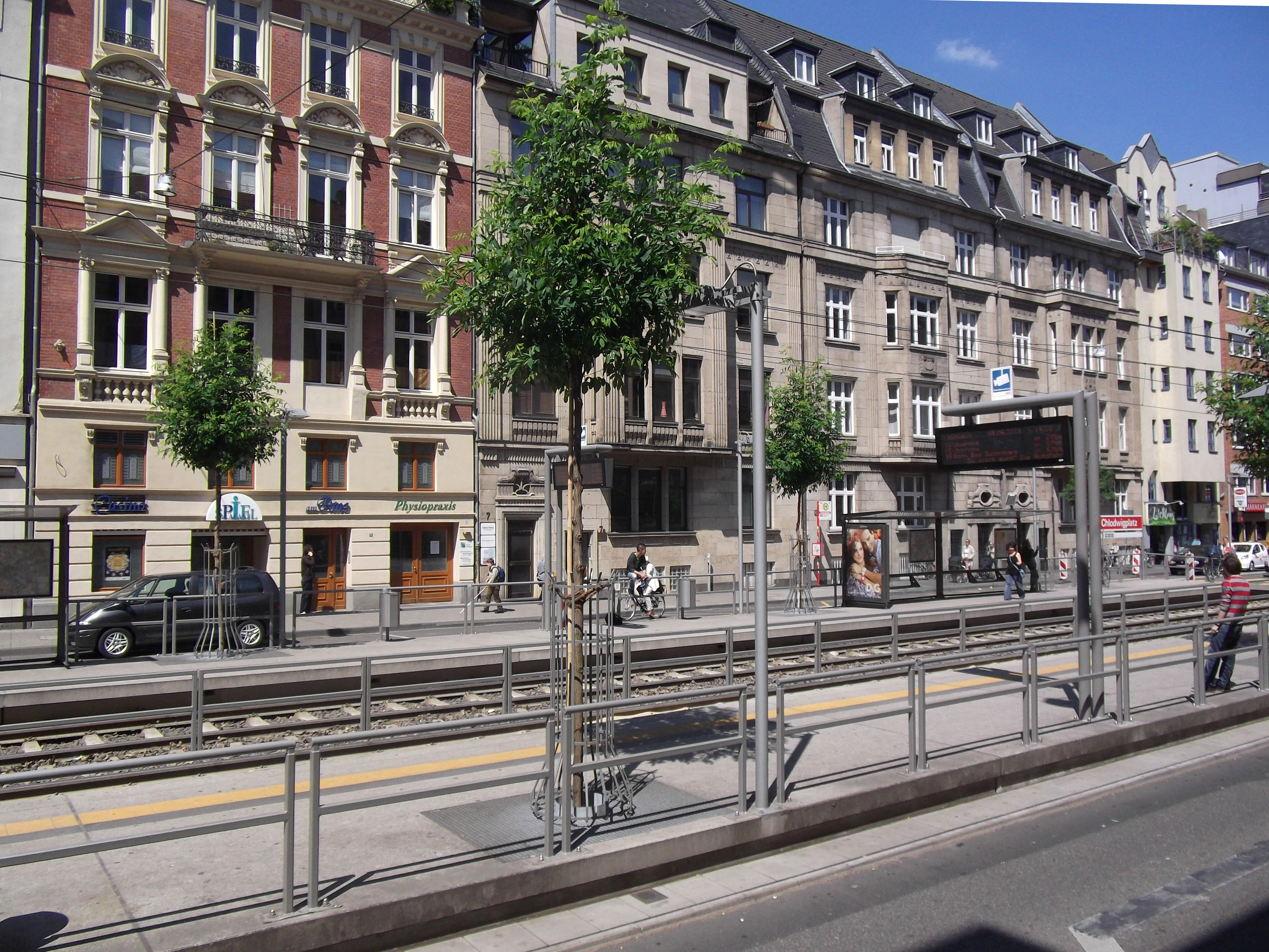
- Chlodwigplatz station in 2011

General information
- Location: Cologne
- Coordinates: 50°55′16″N 06°57′36″E
- Line(s): North-South Stadtbahn tunnel
- Platforms: 2 side platforms, 1 island platform
- Tracks: 4
- Connections: KVB: 106, 132, 133, 142

Construction
- Structure type: Underground; At-grade
- Accessible: Line 16: No; All other lines: Yes

Other information
- Fare zone: VRS: 2100

Services
Preceding station	Cologne Stadtbahn	Following station
At-grade platforms
Ulrepforte towards Köln-Chorweiler or Longerich Friedhof	Line 15	Ubierring Terminus
Ulrepforte towards Niehl Sebastianstraße	Line 16	Ubierring towards Bad Godesberg Stadthalle
Underground platform
Kartäuserhof towards Severinstraße	Line 17	Bonner Wall towards Sürth

Future services
Preceding station	Cologne Stadtbahn	Following station
Underground platform
Kartäuserhof towards Sparkasse Am Butzweilerhof	Line 5	Bonner Wall towards Marktstraße
Kartäuserhof towards Niehl Sebastianstraße	Line 16	Bonner Wall towards Bad Godesberg Stadthalle

Chlodwigplatz station is a station on the Cologne Stadtbahn lines 15 and 16 and 17, located in the Cologne district of Neustadt-Süd. The station lies on Chlodwigplatz (part of the Cologne Ring), after which it is named.

The station consists of two side platforms with two rail tracks on the surface, and an Island platform with two tracks in the underground. Once the North-South Stadtbahn is finished, lines 5 and 16 will operate through the tunnel, serving the underground station.

== See also ==
- List of Cologne KVB stations
