= Barbarossaplatz station =

Railway station in Germany

Barbarossaplatz
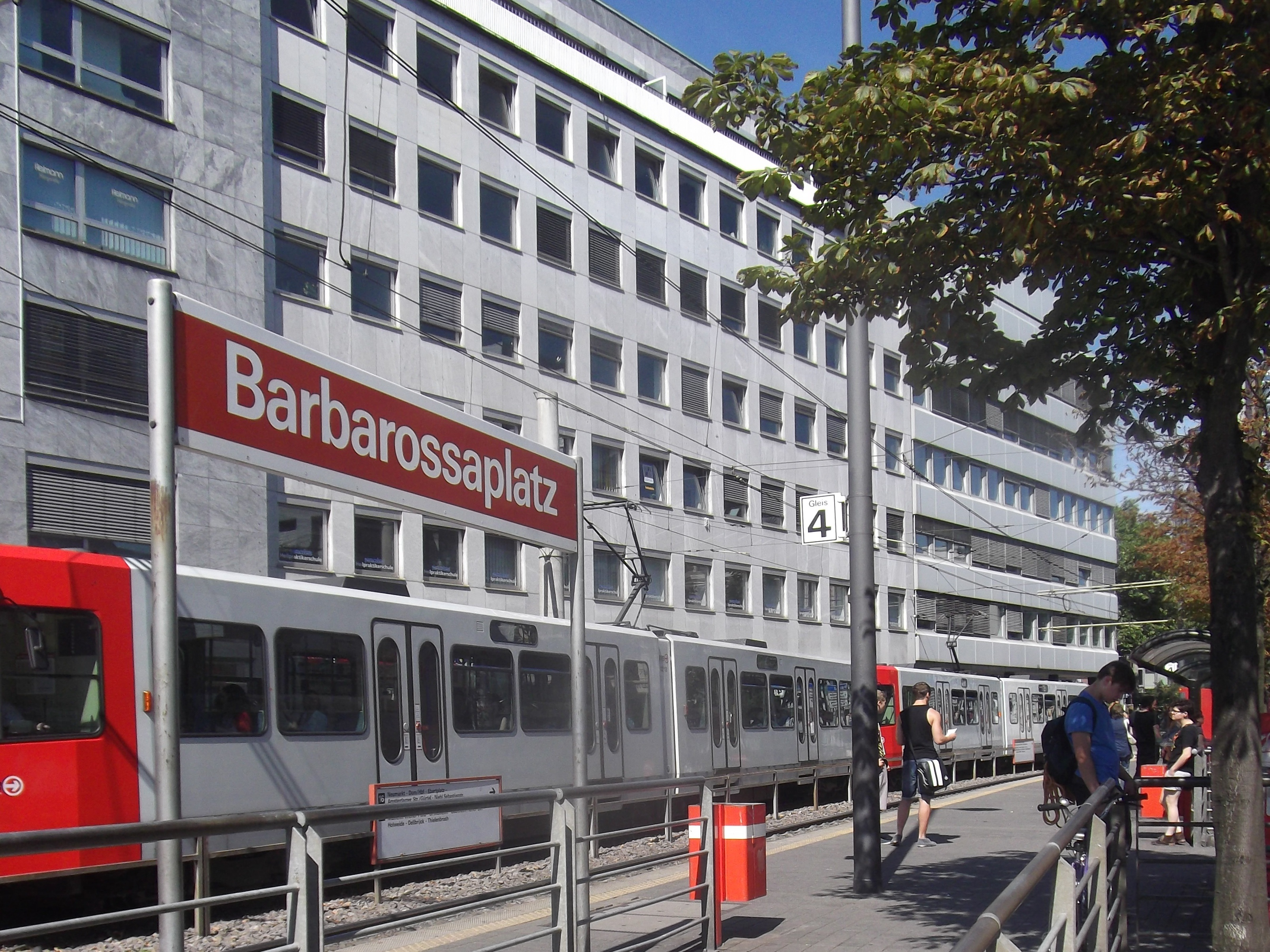
- Barbarossaplatz station

General information
- Location: Barbarossaplatz, 50674 Köln
- Coordinates: 50°55′43″N 6°56′32″E
- Owner: Kölner Verkehrs-Betriebe
- Platforms: 4 side platforms
- Connections: REVG: 978

Construction
- Structure type: At grade
- Accessible: Lines 12 & 15: Yes; Lines 16 & 18: No

Other information
- Fare zone: VRS: 2100

History
- Opened: 1898

Services
Preceding station	Cologne Stadtbahn	Following station
Zülpicher Platz towards Merkenich	Line 12	Eifelstraße towards Zollstock Südfriedhof
Zülpicher Platz towards Köln-Chorweiler or Longerich Friedhof	Line 15	Eifelstraße towards Ubierring
Eifelstraße towards Bad Godesberg Stadthalle	Line 16	Poststraße towards Niehl Sebastianstraße
Eifelwall/Stadtarchiv towards Bonn Hbf	Line 18	Poststraße towards Thielenbruch
Route map
Location

Barbarossaplatz station is an interchange station and hub on Cologne Stadtbahn lines 12, 15, 16 and 18 in the Cologne district of Innenstadt. The station is located at Barbarossaplatz (English: Barbarossa Square), a major junction between the Cologne Ring and Luxemburger Straße. It is one of the few stations in Cologne's city center that has low-floor platforms which only serve high-floor trains.

The station was opened in 1898, and was the terminus of the Vorgebirgsbahn connecting Cologne and Bonn.

With the opening of the Nord-Süd Stadtbahn, line 16 will no longer serve the Cologne Ring, taking the direct route through the new tunnel instead.

== Notable places nearby ==
- Church of St. Pantaleon
- Rheinische Fachhochschule Köln
- «Kwartier Latäng» student quarter

== See also ==
- List of Cologne KVB stations
