= Ulrepforte station =

Railway station in Cologne, Germany

Coordinates: 50°55′26″N 6°57′07″E

Ulrepforte is a station on the Cologne Stadtbahn lines 15 and 16, located in the Cologne district of Innenstadt. The station is located at Ulrepforte on the Cologne Ring.

== See also ==
- List of Cologne KVB stations

Preceding station	Cologne Stadtbahn	Following station
Eifelstraße towards Köln-Chorweiler or Longerich Friedhof	Line 15	Chlodwigplatz towards Ubierring
Eifelstraße towards Niehl Sebastianstraße	Line 16	Chlodwigplatz towards Bad Godesberg Stadthalle
