= Zülpicher Platz station =

Railway interchange in Cologne

Coordinates: 50°55′52″N 6°56′26″E

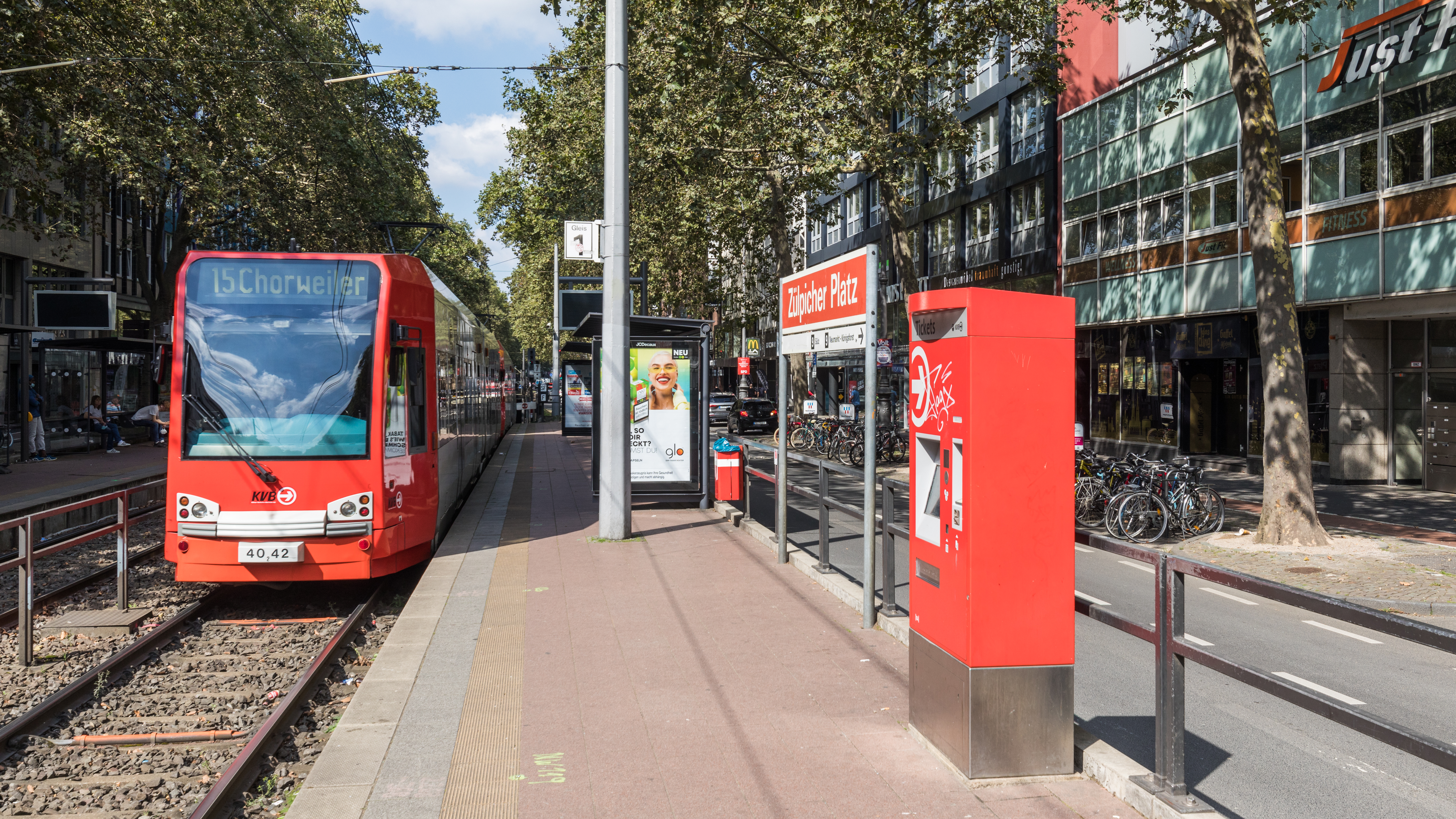
Stadtbahnhaltestelle Zülpicher Platz, Köln

Zülpicher Platz is an interchange station on the Cologne Stadtbahn lines 9, 12 and 15, located in the Cologne district of Innenstadt. The station is located at Zülpicher Platz on the Cologne Ring.

== See also ==
- List of Cologne KVB stations

Preceding station	Cologne Stadtbahn	Following station
Dasselstraße/Bf Süd towards Sülz Hermeskeiler Platz	Line 9	Mauritiuskirche towards Königsforst
Rudolfplatz towards Merkenich	Line 12	Barbarossaplatz towards Zollstock Südfriedhof
Rudolfplatz towards Köln-Chorweiler or Longerich Friedhof	Line 15	Barbarossaplatz towards Ubierring
