= Cologne Ring =

Urban boulevard in Innenstadt, Cologne

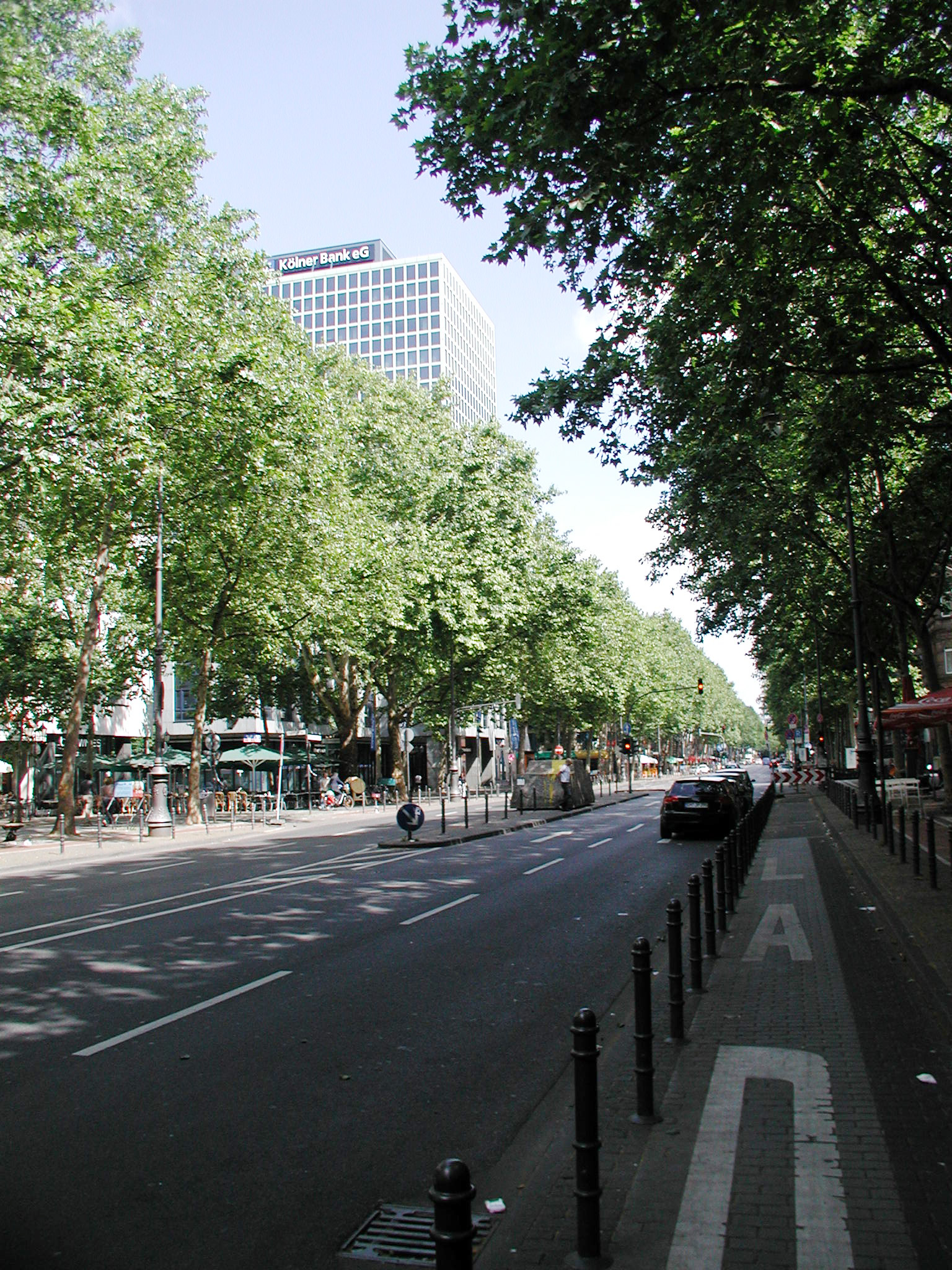
Hohenzollernring, 2008

The Cologne Ring (known in German as: Kölner Ringe) is a semi-circular, some 6 km long urban boulevard in Innenstadt, Cologne and the city's busiest and most prominent street system. The Cologne Ring is a four lane street and part of Bundesstraße 9.

The ring road encircles the old town of Cologne on its southern, western and northern boundaries on the site of the former medieval city wall. It divides Innenstadt into old town (Altstadt) east of it and new town (Neustadt) west of it. Most of the city wall has been worked away during the 1880s and only few sections of the wall exist today at Hansaring and Sachsenring. Of the once twelve medieval city gates, only the Eigelsteintorburg at Ebertplatz, the Hahnentor at Rudolfplatz and the Severinstorburg at Chlodwigplatz still stand today.

== Sections ==
map	KVB station	lines of Cologne Stadtbahn									
	Ebertplatz							12	15	16	18
	Hansaring							12	15		
	Christophstraße/Mediapark							12	15		
	Friesenplatz		3	4	5			12	15		
	Rudolfplatz	1				7		12	15		
	Zülpicher Platz						9	12	15		
	Barbarossaplatz							12	15	16	18
	Eifelstraße							12	15	16	
	Ulrepforte								15	16	
	Chlodwigplatz								15	16	
	Ubierring								15	16	

The Cologne Ring is a composition of several roads and squares, for which it is known in German in the plural form (Ringe). The sections are named after people and personalities of the history of Cologne and Germany. The following is a list of these sections, clockwise from south to north:

=== Ubierring ===
The Ubierring is the southern end of the Cologne Ring and is named after the Ubii, a Germanic tribe and first inhabitants of the new founded Roman city of CCAA. Ubierring is some 400 metres long and joins with Agrippinaufer (a river embankment road along the redeveloped Rheinauhafen, which leads into Bayenthal and Rodenkirchen) to the east and Chlodwigplatz to the west.

- Köln International School of Design
- Rautenstrauch-Joest Museum

=== Chlodwigplatz ===
The Chlodwigsplatz 50°55′16″N 6°57′35″E is a centre of the Severinsviertel, a busy traffic roundabout and a 5-way intersection of Ubierring from the east, Karolingerring from the north-west, Severinstraße from the north and Merowinger and Bonner Straße from the south. Chlodwigplatz is named after Clovis I (German: Chlodwig I.) (c. 466 - 511), King of the Franks from the Merovingian dynasty.

- Severinstorburg

=== Karolingerring ===
The Karolingerring is a short, 200-metre-long portion of the Cologne Ring, and only 30 metres in width, one of its narrowest sections. The Karolingerring is named after the Frankish Carolingian dynasty.

=== Sachsenring ===
The Sachsenring is—in contrast to the preceding Karolingerring—a wide landscaped Avenue, with a central lawn and several lines of trees. The Sachsenring is named after the Ottonian dynasty (919-1024), also known as Saxon dynasty. This 800-metre-long section of the ring road is bounded by mostly free-standing, modern office blocks, as well as the early 13th century Ulrepforte.

- Cologne Business School
- Humboldt-Gymnasium
- Institut Français

=== Salierring ===
The Salierring is some 400 metres long and forms a transition between the landscaped Sachsenring and the urban Barbarossaplatz. It is named after the Salian dynasty (1024–1125).

=== Barbarossaplatz ===
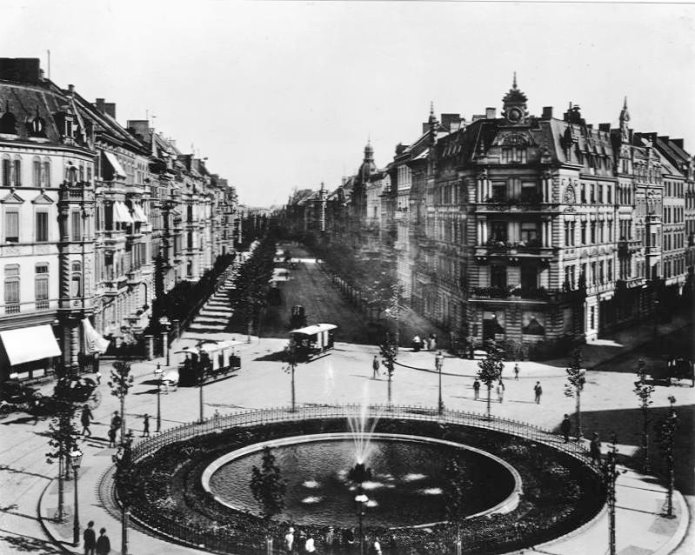
Barbarossaplatz, 1890

As several roads and tram lines meet at Barbarossaplatz 50°55′45″N 6°56′30″E, the square is an important hub for private and public transportation in Cologne. The Cologne Ring running north–south, Luxemburger Straße, leading into Sülz and Klettenberg, and Roonstraße leading onto Rathenauplatz. Cologne Stadtbahn has stations on Barbarossaplatz for tram lines 12, 15, 16 and 18. The square is named after Holy Roman Emperor Frederick I Barbarossa (1122–1190) and was originally laid out as an oval space with two circular traffic islands. Today, the spatial experience is largely overshadowed by a dominant, longitudinal tram station, which occupies most of the square. The square is one of the most discussed urban spaces in Cologne for re-development.

=== Hohenstaufenring ===
North of Barbarossaplatz, the character of the Cologne Ring changes drastically, as all ground floors are occupied by shops, galleries and/or department stores and nearly all upper floors are being used as offices. Also, the trees are older and taller, which give the Ring a more cosmopolitan character. The Hohenstaufenring extends some 600 metres up to Schaafenstraße (where it turns unnoticeably into Habsburgerring). Halfway along its course, Hohenstaufenring passes the Sacred Heart Church (Herz-Jesu-Kirche) on Zülpicher Platz, the latter also serves as a tram station. Hohenstaufenring is named after the Hohenstaufen dynasty, a dynasty of German kings lasting from 1138 to 1254.

- Rheinische Fachhochschule Köln
- Hotel Esplanade

=== Habsburgerring ===
With only 180 metres' length, the Habsburgerring is the shortest section of the Ring. It is named after the Habsburg dynasty. The Barceló Cologne Hotel stands on the site of the former Opernhaus (1904–1944), destroyed during the bombing of Cologne in World War II.

=== Rudolfplatz ===
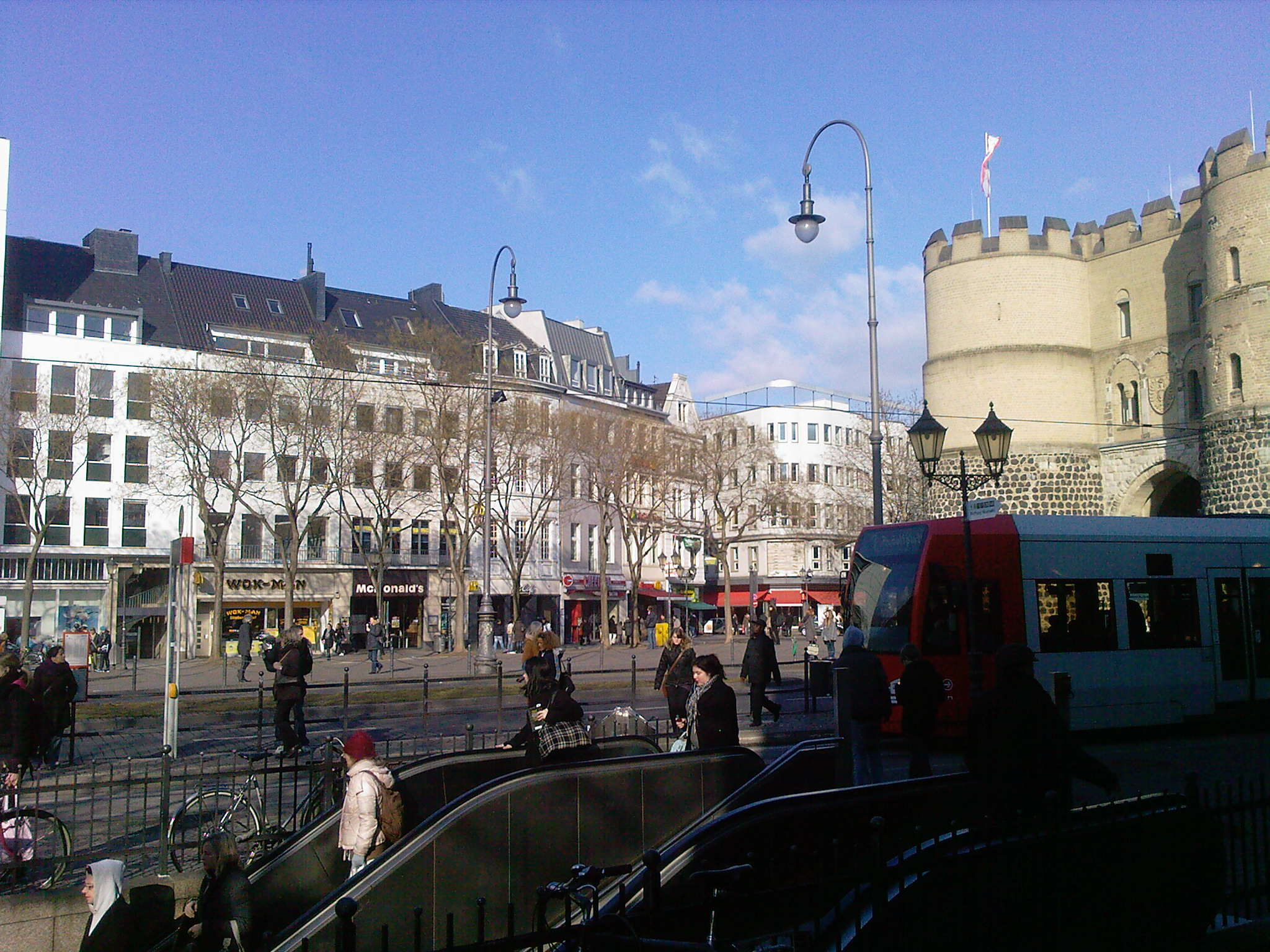
Rudolfplatz, 2010

Rudolfplatz 50°56′11″N 6°56′22″E is the centre of Belgisches Viertel and one of the liveliest squares of Cologne. It is an important hub for private and public transportation in Cologne, as several roads and tram lines meet at Rudolfplatz. The Cologne Ring running north–south, Aachener Straße – the principal east–west arterial road which leads through Lindenthal district to the western extreme of the Cologne Beltway – and Hahnenstraße (which leads via the Neumarkt on to the Deutzer Brücke). Cologne Stadtbahn has stations on Rudolfplatz for tram lines 1, 7, 12 and 15. The square is named after Rudolph I of Germany (1218–1291).

- Hahnentorburg
- Theater am Rudolfplatz

=== Hohenzollernring ===
The Hohenzollernring is the main entertainment district of Cologne, with numerous restaurants, cafes, movie theaters, discothèques and night clubs along its course and in the adjacent side streets.

Since the 1990s, competing gangs of bouncers have fought over control of the nightclubs here, extorting money from the clubs and befriending girls for exploitation as prostitutes.

The Hohenzollernring is lined with tall trees and is about 700 metres long. About halfway, Hohenzollernring passes Friesenplatz, centre of the Friesenviertel, and a major U-Bahn station. At Friesenplatz, the Venloer Straße leads into Ehrenfeld. The Hohenzollernring is named after the Hohenzollern dynasty.

- Taschen building
- Gerling Ring-Karree

=== Kaiser-Wilhelm-Ring ===
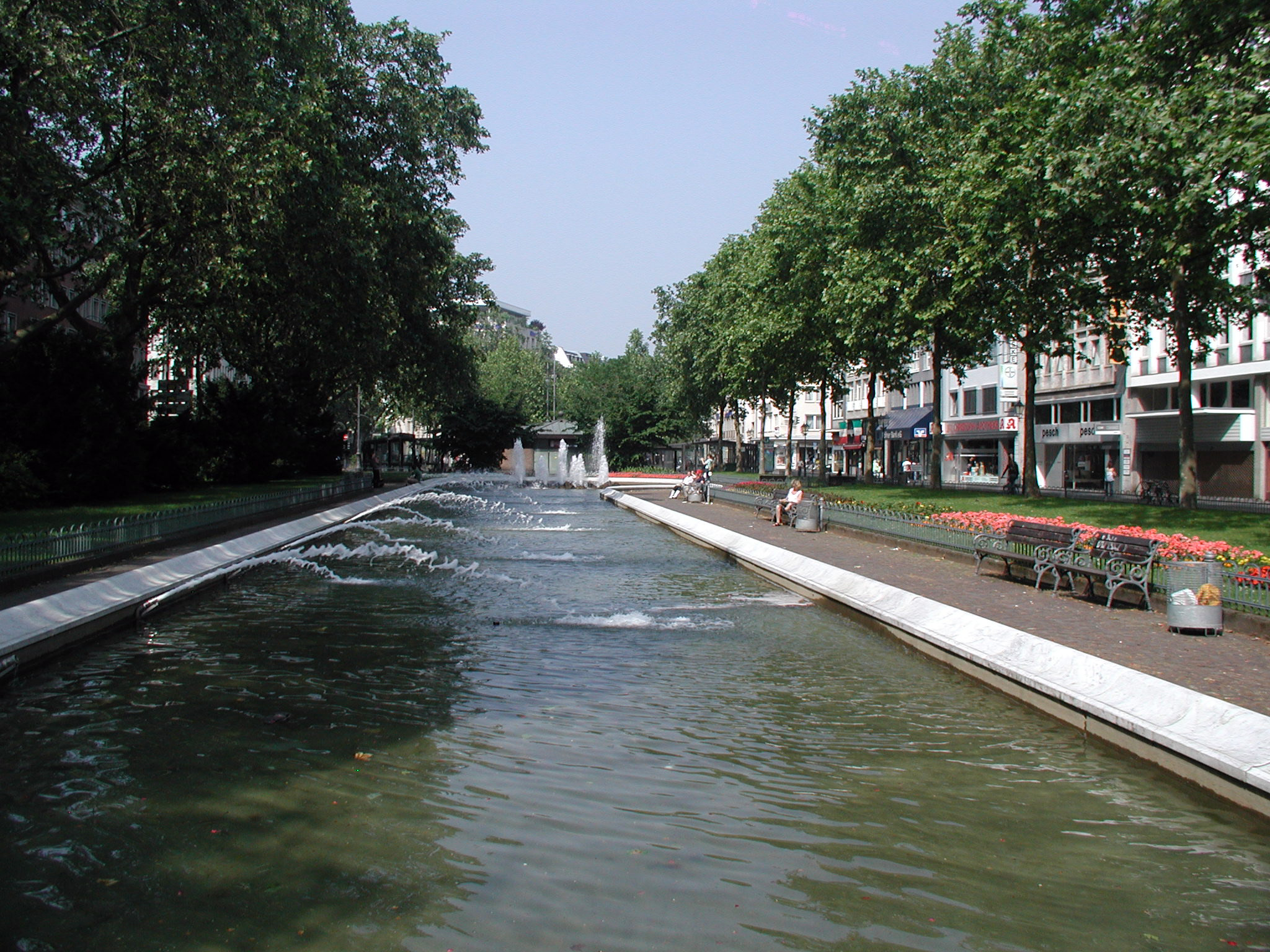
fountains at Kaiser-Wilhelm-Ring, 2008

The Kaiser-Wilhelm-Ring is an urban esplanade, some 360 metres long, with a landscaped central part and a large fountain. Nevertheless, it has a mainly commercial character. On the northern end lies the Christophstraße/Mediapark U-Bahn station. Kaiser-Wilhelm-Ring is named after Wilhelm I of Germany (1797–1888).

=== Hansaring ===
At a length of 1,100 metres, the Hansaring is one of the longest sections of the Cologne Ring. Commercial activity decreases noticeably compared to Hohenzollernring, and only gradually increases towards Ebertplatz and the neighboring Eigelsteinviertel. The name of the Hansaring pays tribute to Cologne's history as a Hanseatic city from the 13th to 17th century. Among the landmarks on Hansaring are the building of the former Cologne Graduate School of Management (Handelshochschule), erected on Hansaring in 1901; since 1907 the building has been home to the Hansa-Gymnasium. In 1925, Cologne's first skyscraper, the Hansahochhaus, was built opposite the Gymnasium.

=== Ebertplatz ===
The Ebertplatz 50°57′2″N 6°57′28″E is named after Friedrich Ebert (1871–1925), first President of Germany in the Weimar Republic, though the square was originally named Deutscher Platz. The square is actually a spatial continuation of the larger Theodor-Heuss-Ring. On the western end, Hansaring opens onto Ebertplatz, the eastern end bleeds into the park-like Theodor-Heuss-Ring. On the northern edge of the square, Riehler and Neusser Straße lead into Agnesviertel and Nippes. Ebertplatz U-Bahn station is a large interchange station four Cologne Stadtbahn lines and the city's largest subway station.

- Eigelsteintorburg

=== Theodor-Heuss-Ring ===
Theodor-Heuss-Ring is a 500 metre long by 100 metre wide park, locked between Ebertplatz and the Rhine shore at Konrad-Adenauer-Ufer. The park is a preferred residential area, with some corporate headquarters and offices. While the block South of the park is a densely built up area and border of the subsequent Kunibertsviertel, the block North of the park mainly consists of free standing buildings. Among the buildings on the northern side are the Ringturm skyscraper and the art nouveau Villa Bestgen.

== See also ==
- List of streets in Cologne
- Cologne Beltway
- Ringstraße, Vienna
