= Eifelstraße station =

Tram station in Cologne, Germany

Coordinates: 50°55′35″N 6°56′45″E

Eifelstraße is an interchange station on the Cologne Stadtbahn lines 12, 15, and 16, located in the Cologne district of Innenstadt. The station is located at Eifelstraße on the Cologne Ring.

== See also ==
- List of Cologne KVB stations

Preceding station	Cologne Stadtbahn	Following station
Barbarossaplatz towards Merkenich	Line 12	Eifelplatz towards Zollstock Südfriedhof
Barbarossaplatz towards Köln-Chorweiler or Longerich Friedhof	Line 15	Ulrepforte towards Ubierring
Barbarossaplatz towards Niehl Sebastianstraße	Line 16	Ulrepforte towards Bad Godesberg Stadthalle
