= Rudolfplatz station =

Metro station in Cologne, Germany

Rudolfplatz
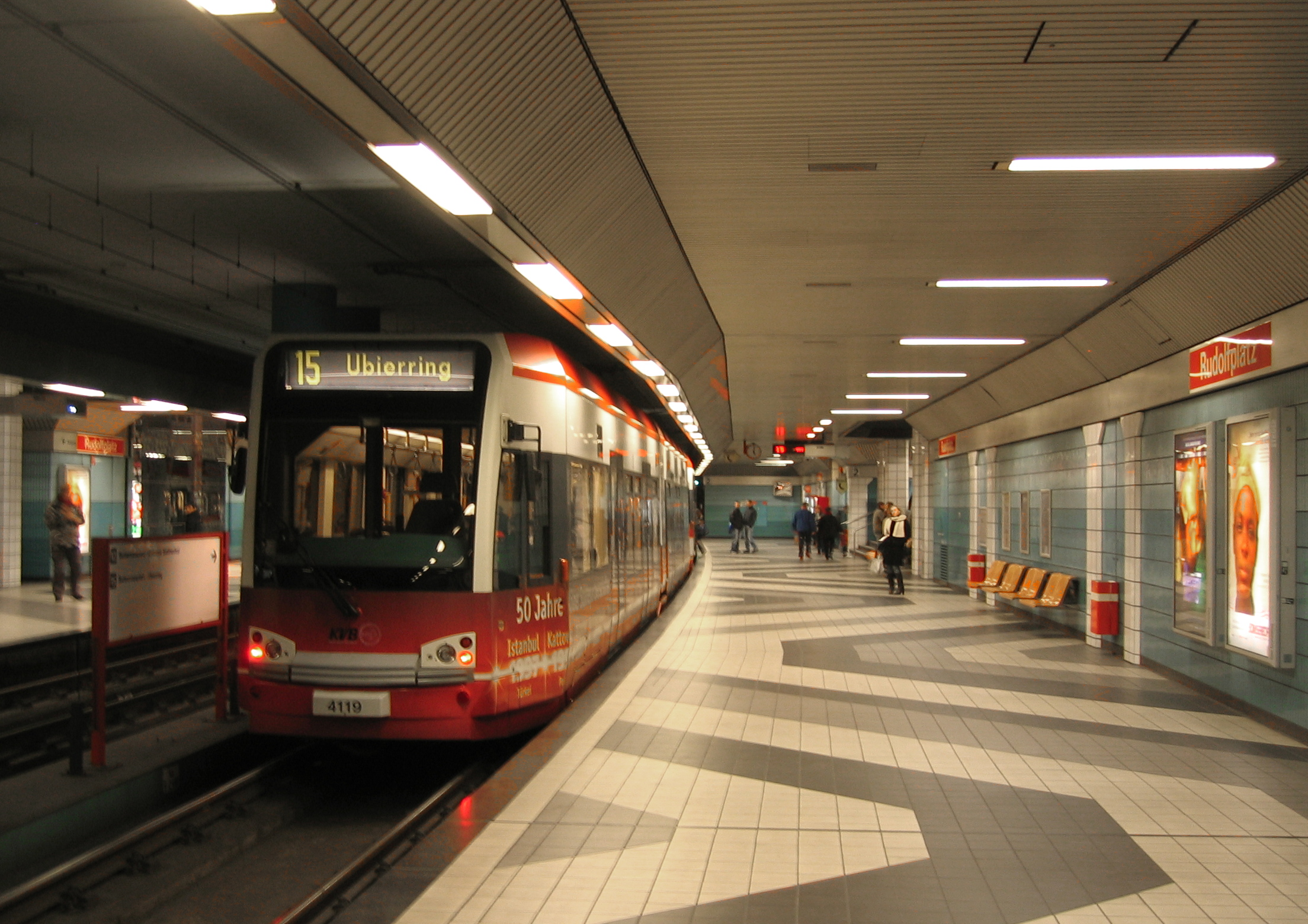
- Rudolfplatz station

General information
- Location: Rudolfplatz, 50672 Köln
- Coordinates: 50°56′12″N 6°56′20″E
- Owner: Kölner Verkehrs-Betriebe
- Line: Ring tunnel
- Platforms: 4 side platforms
- Connections: KVB: 136, 146; Taxi stand

Construction
- Structure type: Underground; At grade
- Accessible: Yes

Other information
- Fare zone: VRS: 2100

History
- Opened: 31 October 1987

Services
Preceding station	Cologne Stadtbahn	Following station
Moltkestraße towards Köln-Weiden West	Line 1	Neumarkt towards Bensberg
Moltkestraße towards Frechen-Benzelrath	Line 7	Neumarkt towards Zündorf
Friesenplatz towards Merkenich	Line 12	Zülpicher Platz towards Zollstock Südfriedhof
Friesenplatz towards Köln-Chorweiler or Longerich Friedhof	Line 15	Zülpicher Platz towards Ubierring
Route map
Location

Rudolfplatz station is an interchange station and hub on the Cologne Stadtbahn lines 1, 7, 12 and 15 in the Cologne district of Innenstadt. The station is located at Rudolfplatz, a major junction between the Cologne Ring and Aachener Straße. It opened in 1987 and is divided into an overground part for lines 1 and 7 and an underground part for lines 12 and 15.

== Notable places nearby ==
- Hahnentor
- Hohenzollernring entertainment district
- Millowitsch-Theater, Aachener Straße

== See also ==
- List of Cologne KVB stations
