= Friesenplatz station =

Cologne Stadtbahn station

Friesenplatz
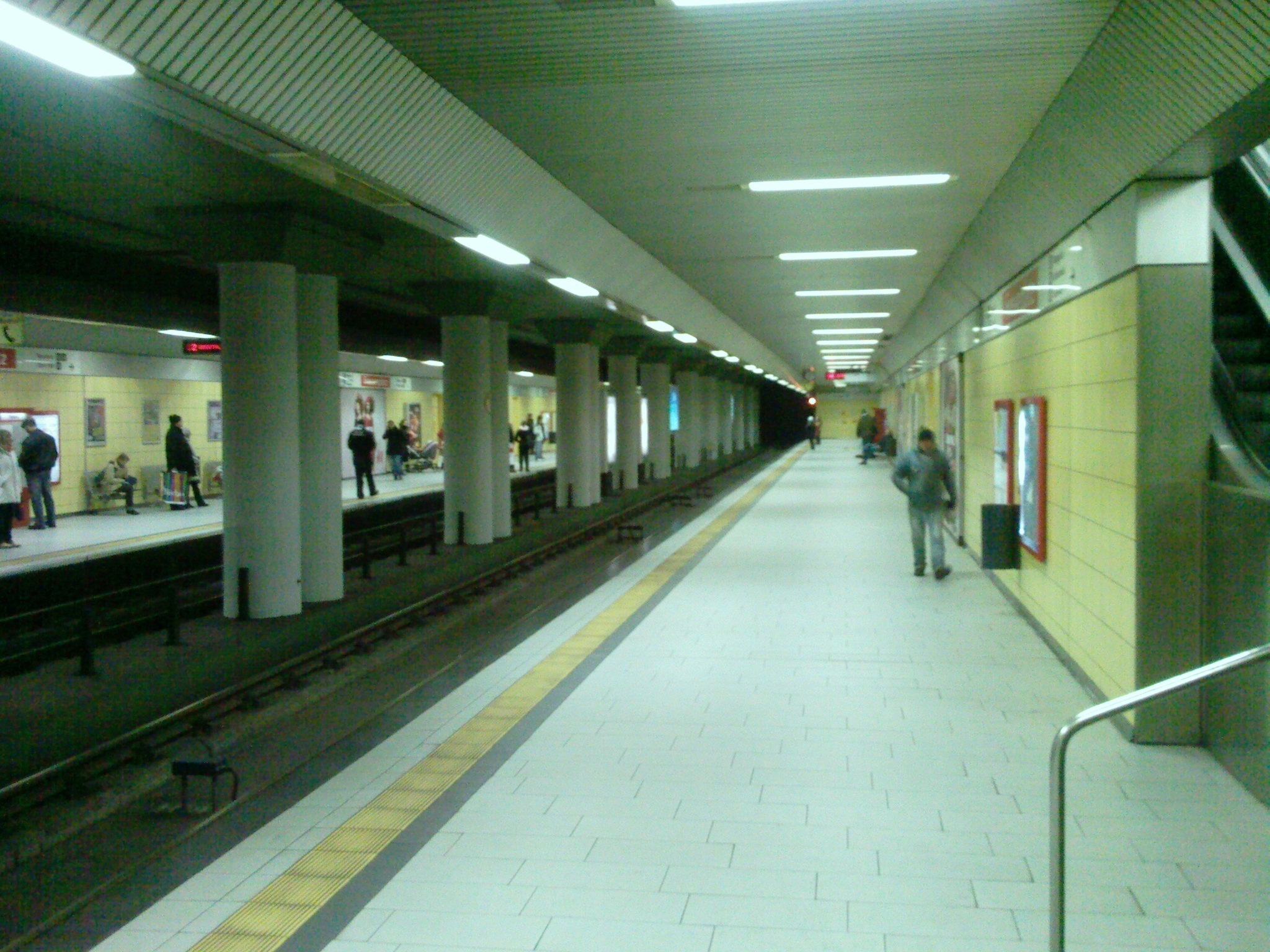
- Friesenplatz station

General information
- Location: Friesenplatz; Cologne
- Coordinates: 50°56′26″N 6°56′25″E
- Owner: Kölner Verkehrs-Betriebe
- Lines: Innenstadt tunnel; Ring tunnel
- Platforms: 4 side platforms
- Connections: KVB: 172, 173

Construction
- Structure type: Underground
- Cycle facilities: Call a Bike
- Accessible: No

Other information
- Fare zone: VRS: 2100

History
- Opened: 1985

Services
Preceding station	Cologne Stadtbahn	Following station
Hans-Böckler-Platz/Bf West towards Görlinger-Zentrum	Line 3	Appellhofplatz towards Thielenbruch
Hans-Böckler-Platz/Bf West towards Bocklemünd	Line 4	Appellhofplatz towards Schlebusch
Hans-Böckler-Platz/Bf West towards Sparkasse Am Butzweilerhof	Line 5	Appellhofplatz towards Heumarkt
Christophstraße/Mediapark towards Merkenich	Line 12	Rudolfplatz towards Zollstock Südfriedhof
Christophstraße/Mediapark towards Köln-Chorweiler or Longerich Friedhof	Line 15	Rudolfplatz towards Ubierring
Route map
Location

Friesenplatz is an underground station and hub on the Cologne Stadtbahn lines 3, 4, 5, 12 and 15 in Cologne. The station lies on the Cologne Ring, at the corner of the Friesenplatz, in the district of Innenstadt.

The station was opened in 1985 and consists of a mezzanine and two platform levels with four side platforms and four rail tracks. The upper platform level, served by lines 3, 4 and 5, is part of the Innenstadt tunnel (English: inner city tunnel), while the lower platform level, served by lines 12 and 15 is part of the Ring tunnel.

== Notable places nearby ==
- Hohenzollernring entertainment district
- Gerling Ring-Karree
- Päffgen Brewery, Friesenstraße

== See also ==
- List of Cologne KVB stations
