= Kartäuserhof station =

Railway station in Cologne, Germany

Kartäuserhof
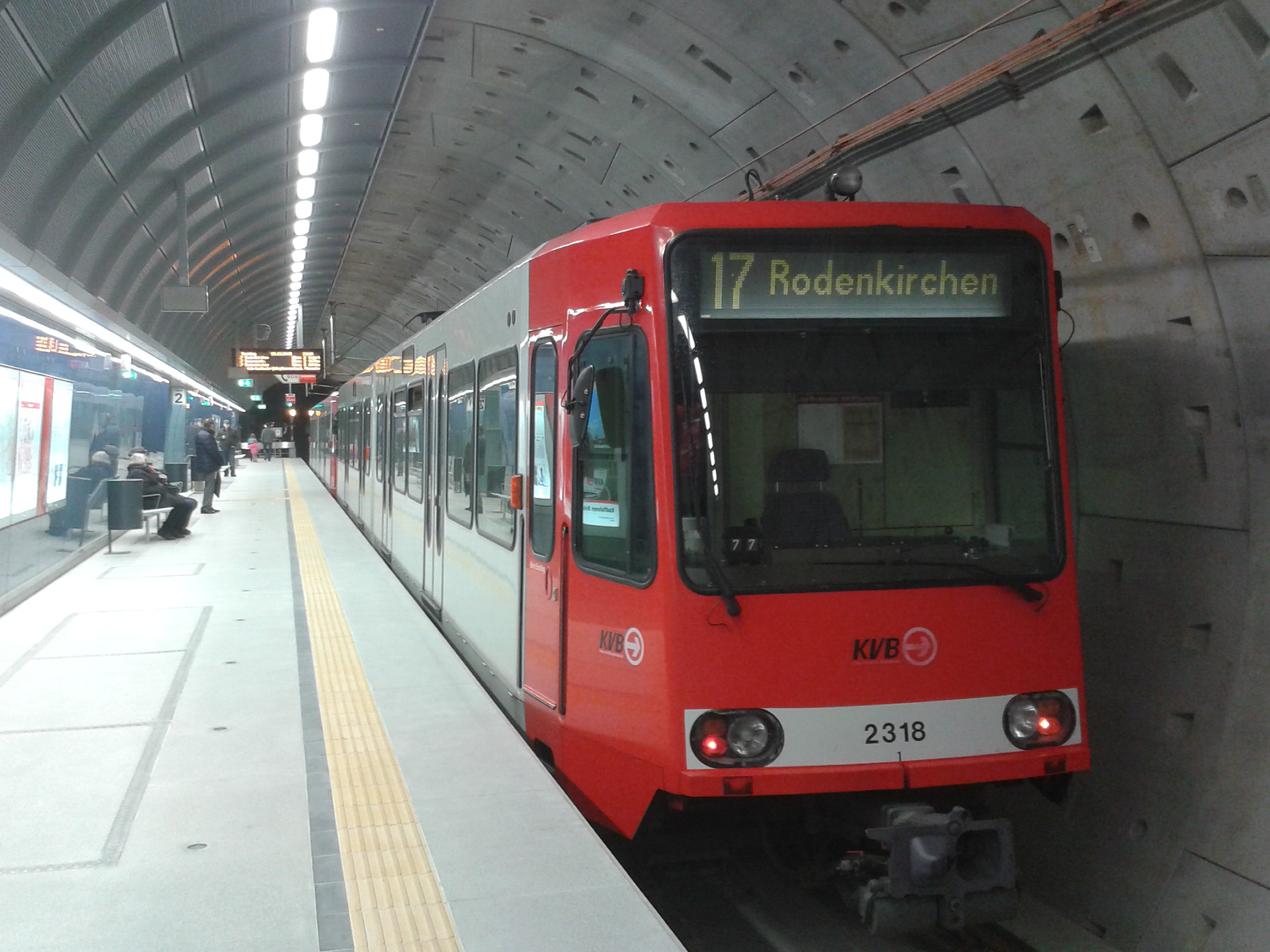
- Kartäuserhof station platform in 2015

General information
- Location: Cologne
- Coordinates: 50°55′32″N 06°57′30″E
- Owner: Kölner Verkehrs-Betriebe (KVB)
- Line: North-South Stadtbahn tunnel
- Platforms: 1 island platform
- Tracks: 2

Construction
- Structure type: Underground
- Accessible: Yes

Other information
- Fare zone: VRS: 2100

History
- Opened: 13 December 2015

Services
| Preceding station | Cologne Stadtbahn | Following station |
|---|---|---|
| Severinstraße Terminus | Line 17 | Bonner Wall towards Sürth |

Future services
| Preceding station | Cologne Stadtbahn | Following station |
|---|---|---|
| Severinstraße towards Sparkasse Am Butzweilerhof | Line 5 | Chlodwigplatz towards Marktstraße |
| Severinstraße towards Niehl Sebastianstraße | Line 16 | Chlodwigplatz towards Bad Godesberg Stadthalle |
Location

Kartäuserhof station is a station on Cologne Stadtbahn line 17. The station opened on 13 December 2015 with interim service on line 17. When the entire North-South Stadtbahn tunnel is complete, it is expected to be served by both lines 5 and 16.

== See also ==
- List of Cologne KVB stations
