= Christophstraße/Mediapark station =

Railway station in Cologne, Germany

Christophstraße/Mediapark
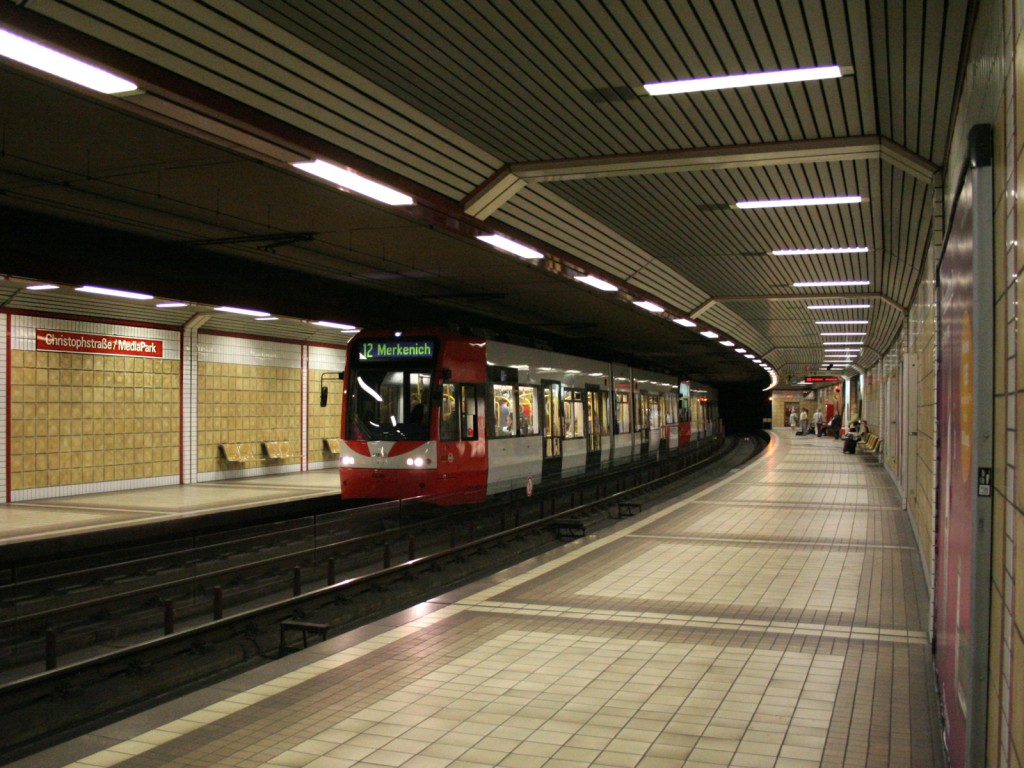
- A Stadtbahn train at the station in 2007

General information
- Location: Innenstadt, Cologne; Germany
- Coordinates: 50°56′41″N 6°56′32″E
- Owner: Kölner Verkehrs-Betriebe (KVB)
- Line: Ring tunnel
- Platforms: 2 side platforms
- Tracks: 2

Construction
- Structure type: Underground

Other information
- Fare zone: VRS: 2100

Services
Preceding station	Cologne Stadtbahn	Following station
Köln Hansaring towards Merkenich	Line 12	Friesenplatz towards Zollstock Südfriedhof
Köln Hansaring towards Köln-Chorweiler or Longerich Friedhof	Line 15	Friesenplatz towards Ubierring
Location

Christophstraße/Mediapark station is an underground Cologne Stadtbahn station in the MediaPark neighborhood, in Cologne, Germany. The station is located on the Cologne Ring.
