= Media Park =

Media Park may refer to:

- Media Park (Hilversum, Netherlands)
- Media Park (Los Angeles, California)

== See also ==
- MediaPark (Cologne, Germany)
