= Moltkestraße station =

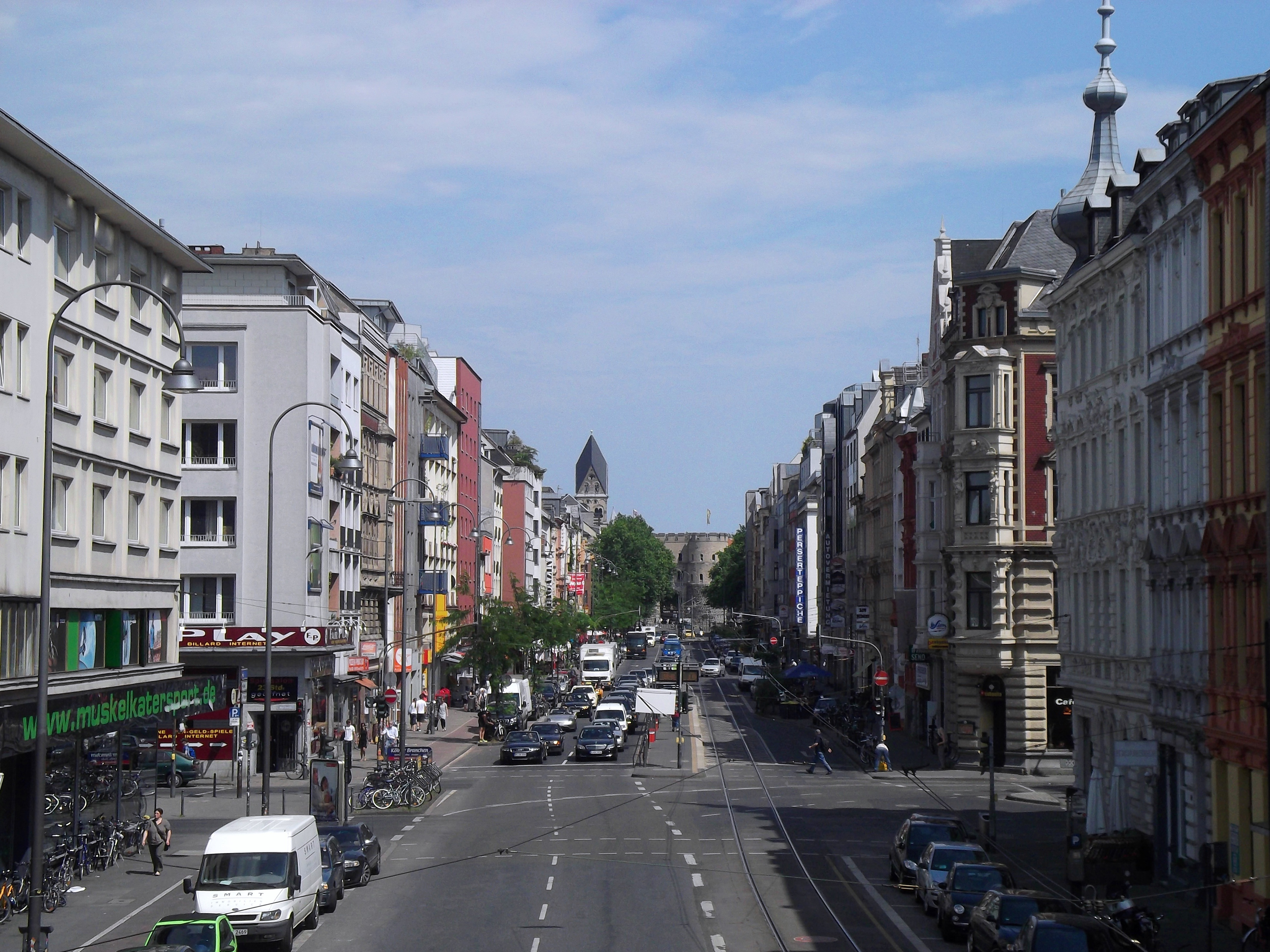
View of Aachener Straße; the Stadtbahn tracks and platform visible in the centre

Moltkestraße is a light rail station on the Cologne Stadtbahn lines 1 and 7, located in the Neustadt of Cologne. The station's two platforms lie at Moltkestraße, though one block apart from each other. The platform for inbound (downtown) trains lies at Richard-Wagner-Straße, the platform for outbound trains at Aachener Straße.

The station serves Cologne's Belgisches Viertel (Belgian Quarter).

== See also ==
- List of Cologne KVB stations

Preceding station	Cologne Stadtbahn	Following station
Universitätsstraße towards Köln-Weiden West	Line 1	Rudolfplatz towards Bensberg
Universitätsstraße towards Frechen-Benzelrath	Line 7	Rudolfplatz towards Zündorf
