= Poststraße station =

Cologne Stadtbahn station

Poststraße
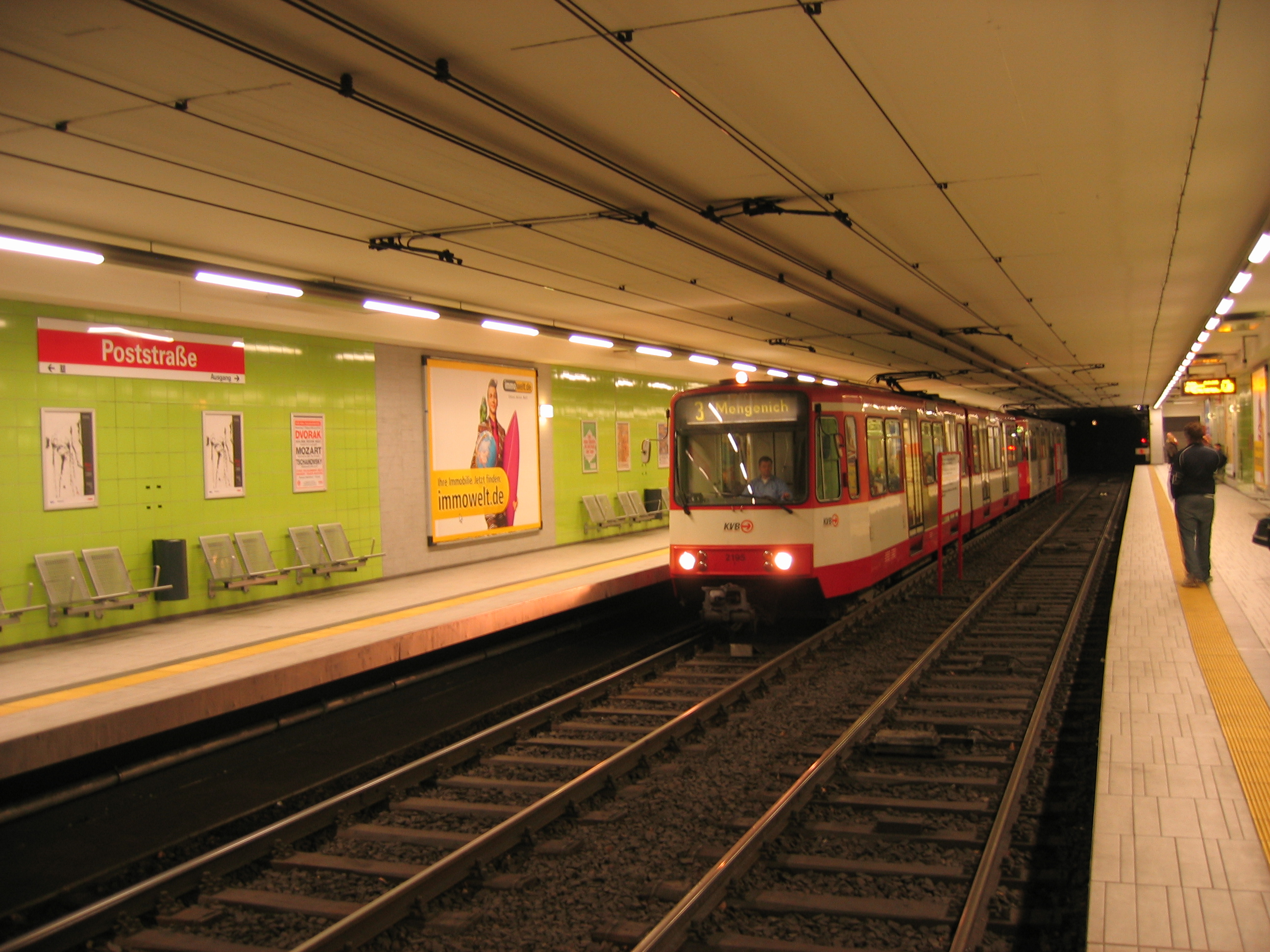
- Poststraße station in 2008

General information
- Location: Poststraße; Cologne
- Coordinates: 50°55′51″N 6°57′0″E
- Owner: Kölner Verkehrs-Betriebe
- Line: Innenstadt Stadtbahn tunnel
- Platforms: 2 side platforms
- Tracks: 2
- Connections: REVG: 978

Construction
- Structure type: Underground
- Accessible: Yes

Other information
- Fare zone: VRS: 2100

History
- Opened: 1969
- Rebuilt: 2006, 2016

Services
Preceding station	Cologne Stadtbahn	Following station
Neumarkt towards Görlinger-Zentrum	Line 3	Severinstraße towards Thielenbruch
Neumarkt towards Bocklemünd	Line 4	Severinstraße towards Schlebusch
Neumarkt towards Niehl Sebastianstraße	Line 16	Barbarossaplatz towards Bad Godesberg Stadthalle
Neumarkt towards Thielenbruch	Line 18	Barbarossaplatz towards Bonn Hbf
Route map
Location

Poststraße station is an underground station on lines 3, 4, 16 and 18 of the Cologne Stadtbahn system. The station is located under Poststraße (English: Post Street), after which the station is named, near its intersection with Rothgerberbach. The station serves the Cologne district of Innenstadt. It is the southernmost station in the Innenstadt tunnel (English: inner city tunnel).

Currently, the station serves 30 trains per hour per direction, the maximum possible with the current technical equipment and at grade-crossing just before the station, regularly, with line 18 running on 5-minute headways and the other three lines on 10 minutes each. Once the North-South Stadtbahn tunnel is finished, line 16 will run through the new tunnel, reducing the amount of trains per hour per direction to 24.

== History ==
The station was opened in 1969 and consists of two side platforms and two rail tracks. Poststraße station was built with comparatively narrow platforms, a decision made to save money during construction and because the station was expected to have relatively little passenger traffic because it is located in a primarily residential area and close to the larger Neumarkt station.

Poststraße was originally built with low-level platforms to allow streetcars to use the station. The final streetcar service ended in 2003, which enabled the conversion to high-platforms, but unlike the busy Neumarkt and Dom/Hbf stations, there were no immediate plans to raise the platforms. The decision to build the high platforms came at short notice in 2006. Preparations for North-South Stadtbahn tunnel construction required a week-long closure of the Innenstadt tunnel. That time was also used to build the high platforms at Appellhofplatz and Poststraße stations. However, it would take until 2016 for elevators to be added to the station, creating an accessible (step-free) station.

== Notable places nearby ==
- Agrippabad (public pool)
- Church of St. Georg
- Church of St. Pantaleon
- Kleiner & Großer Griechenmarkt
- Wasserturm Hotel

== See also ==
- List of Cologne KVB stations
