= Schönhauser Straße station =

Railway station in Cologne, Germany

Schönhauser Straße
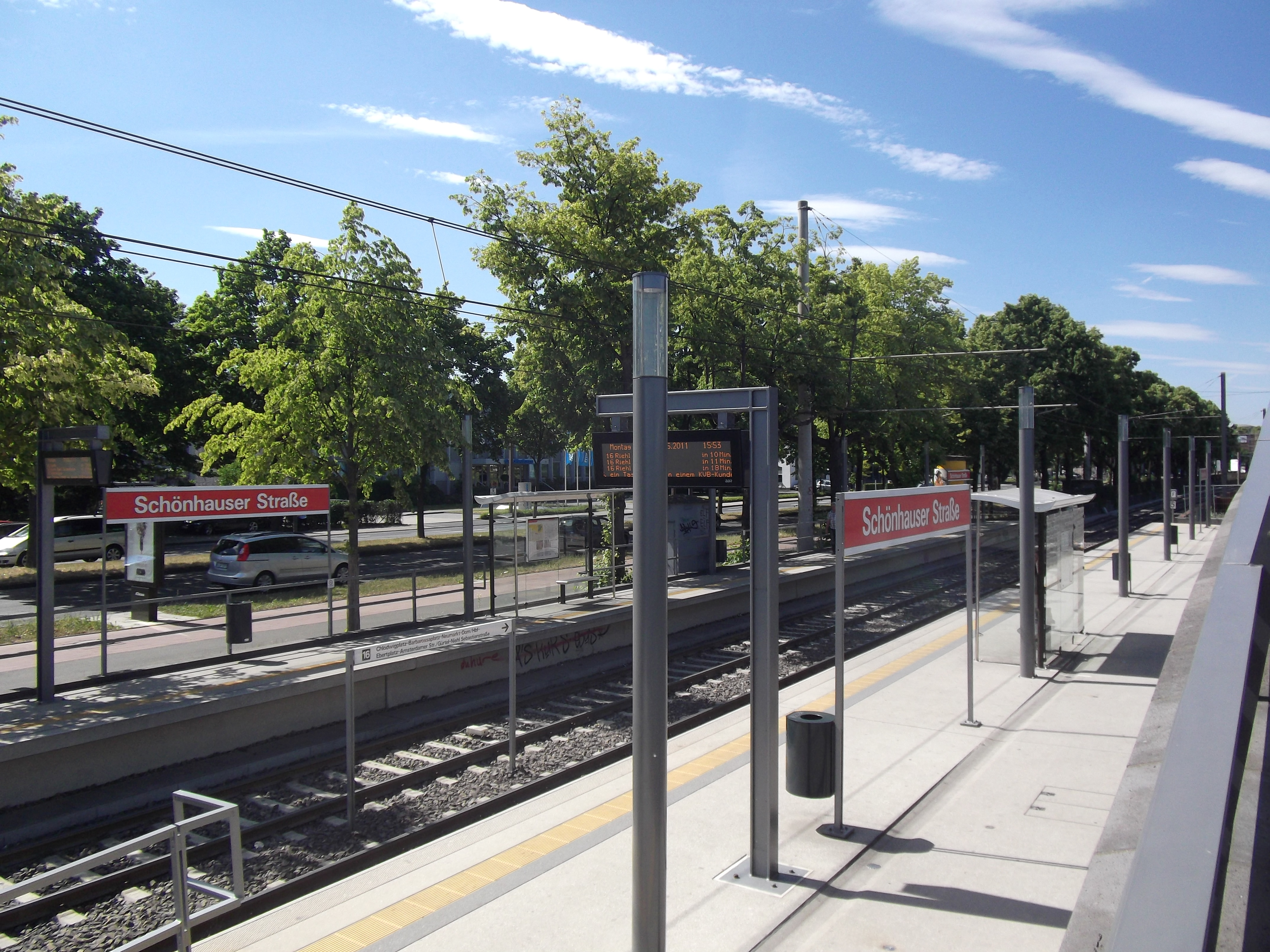
- Schönhauser Straße station platform in 2011

General information
- Location: Cologne
- Coordinates: 50°54′51″N 06°58′19″E
- Owner: Kölner Verkehrs-Betriebe (KVB)
- Platforms: 2 side platforms
- Tracks: 2

Construction
- Structure type: At-grade
- Accessible: Yes

Other information
- Fare zone: VRS: 2100

History
- Opened: 1905

Services
Preceding station	Cologne Stadtbahn	Following station
Ubierring towards Niehl Sebastianstraße	Line 16	Bayenthalgürtel towards Bad Godesberg Stadthalle
Bonner Wall towards Severinstraße	Line 17	Bayenthalgürtel towards Sürth

Future services
Preceding station	Cologne Stadtbahn	Following station
Bonner Wall towards Niehl Sebastianstraße	Line 16	Bayenthalgürtel towards Bad Godesberg Stadthalle
Location

Schönhauser Straße station is a station on the Cologne Stadtbahn lines 16 and 17, located in the Cologne district of Bayenthal. The station lies on Gustav-Heinemann-Ufer, adjacent to Schönhauser Straße, after which it is named.

The station was opened by the Bonn–Cologne Railway Company in 1905 and consists of two side platforms with two rail tracks.

== See also ==
- List of Cologne KVB stations
