= Bonner Wall station =

Railway station in Cologne, Germany

Bonner Wall
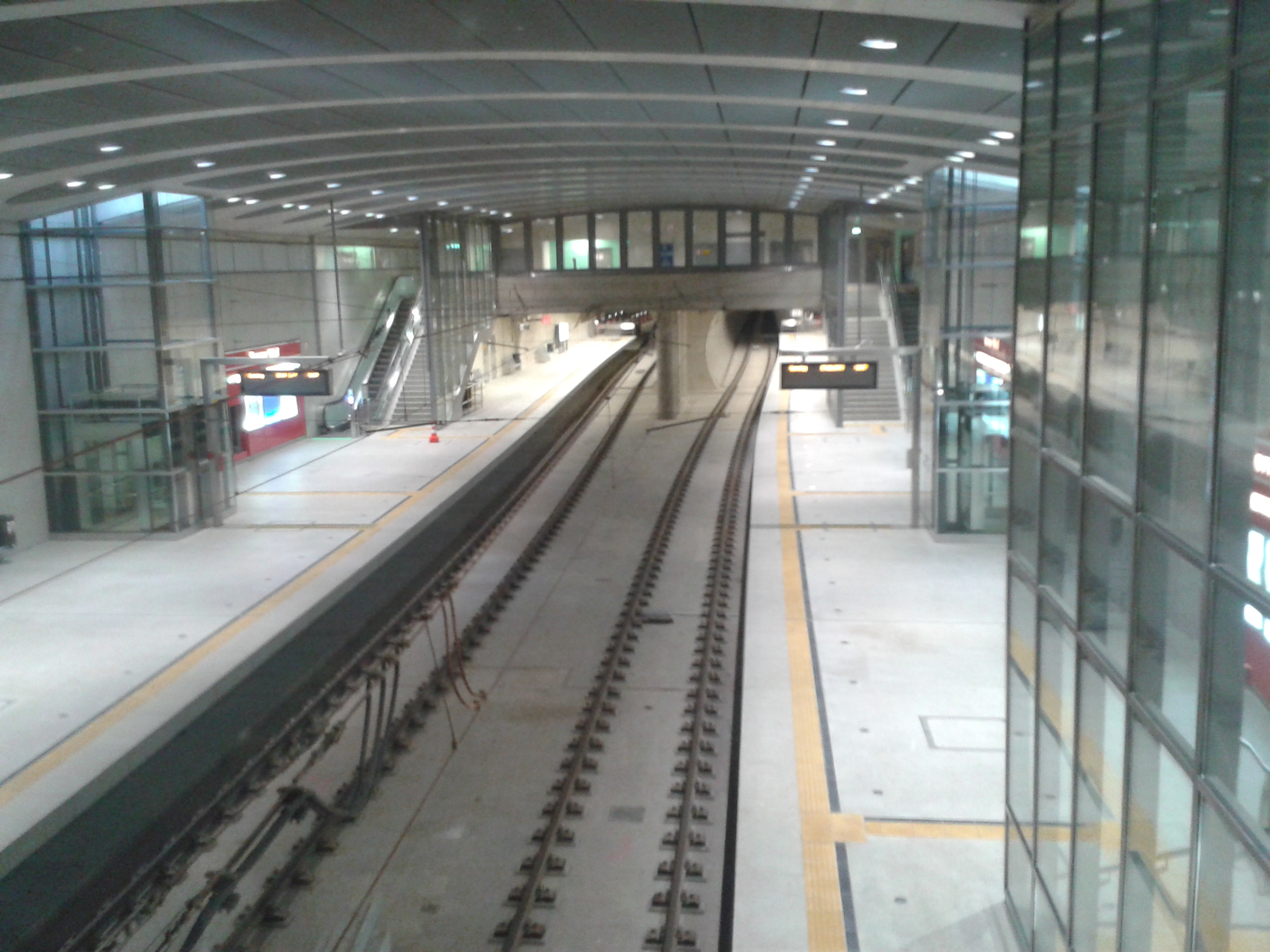
- Bonner Wall station platforms in 2015

General information
- Location: Cologne
- Coordinates: 50°54′58″N 06°57′40″E
- Owner: Kölner Verkehrs-Betriebe (KVB)
- Line: North-South Stadtbahn tunnel
- Platforms: 2 side platforms
- Tracks: 2
- Connections: KVB: 106, 132, 133, 142

Construction
- Structure type: Underground
- Accessible: Yes

Other information
- Fare zone: VRS: 2100

History
- Opened: 13 December 2015

Services
Preceding station	Cologne Stadtbahn	Following station
Chlodwigplatz towards Severinstraße	Line 17	Schönhauser Straße towards Sürth

Future services
Preceding station	Cologne Stadtbahn	Following station
Chlodwigplatz towards Sparkasse Am Butzweilerhof	Line 5	Marktstraße Terminus
Chlodwigplatz towards Niehl Sebastianstraße	Line 16	Schönhauser Straße towards Bad Godesberg Stadthalle
Location

Bonner Wall station is a station on Cologne Stadtbahn line 17. It is the most southern underground station on the North-South Stadtbahn tunnel. The station opened on 13 December 2015 with interim service on line 17. When the entire North-South Stadtbahn tunnel is complete, it is expected to be served by both lines 5 and 16.

== See also ==
- List of Cologne KVB stations
