= Cologne Tower =

Skyscraper in Cologne, Germany

- KölnTurm
- Interactive map of the Cologne Tower area

General information
- Status: Completed
- Architectural style: Modernism
- Location: Im MediaPark 8 Neustadt-Nord, Cologne, Germany
- Coordinates: 50.9481°N 6.9431°E
- Construction started: June 1999
- Completed: November 2001
- Opening: 2001
- Owner: Infrared Capital Partners

Height
- Roof: 148.5 m (487 ft)

Technical details
- Floor count: 44; 2 below ground
- Floor area: 285,000 sq ft (26,500 m^{2})
- Lifts/elevators: 6

Design and construction
- Architects: Ateliers Jean Nouvel; Kohl und Kohl Architekten
- Engineer: Grontmij BGS Ingenieursozietät
- Main contractor: Hochtief

Website
- http://www.koelnturm.de/en/

The Cologne Tower (German: KölnTurm) is a 44-storey office skyscraper in the Köln-Neustadt-Nord district of Cologne, Germany that stands 148.5 m (487 ft) high, or 165.48 m (542.9 ft), including its antenna. Construction of the tower lasted from June 1999 to November 2001. It is the second-tallest building in the city (after the Cathedral), the second-tallest in North Rhine-Westphalia after the Post Tower in Bonn (Cologne Cathedral is considered to be a building in Cologne but is outside of North-Rhine-Westphalia due to the canon law of the Catholic Church), and the 22nd-tallest in Germany.

Because of the tower's location near Cologne's MediaPark, it is home to several media sector companies.

The observation deck and restaurant, located on the 30th floor, were opened to the public in June 2006.

== Architecture ==
Designed around a load-bearing central core, the reinforced concrete tower with an 18-metre (59 ft) mast to its upper end was built in cooperation between the architectural firm Kohl & Kohl and Parisian architect Jean Nouvel.

The glass facade of the building was designed with reflected light in mind. Pictures of the Cologne Cathedral and the skyline of Cologne's Old Town were applied to the glass via screen-printing. Depending on light exposure, different combinations of these images appear on the building.

== Transmitter ==
From the antenna on top of the tower, three FM frequencies are broadcast mainly for the northern districts of Cologne: 98.6 MHz/0.4 kW WDR 2 Regionalfenster Cologne, 87.6 MHz/0.3 kW WDR Eins Live, and 89.9 MHz/0.03 kW Germany Kultur. Despite the low power levels, the height of the antenna allows all frequencies to transmit to the northern suburbs. In 2002, the Cologne Tower replaced the former FM transmitter site on the nearby Hansahochaus on Hansaring.

== See also ==
- List of tallest buildings in Germany
