= MediaPark =

Urban regeneration neighborhood in Cologne, Germany

Coordinates: 50°56′52.84″N 6°56′39.42″E

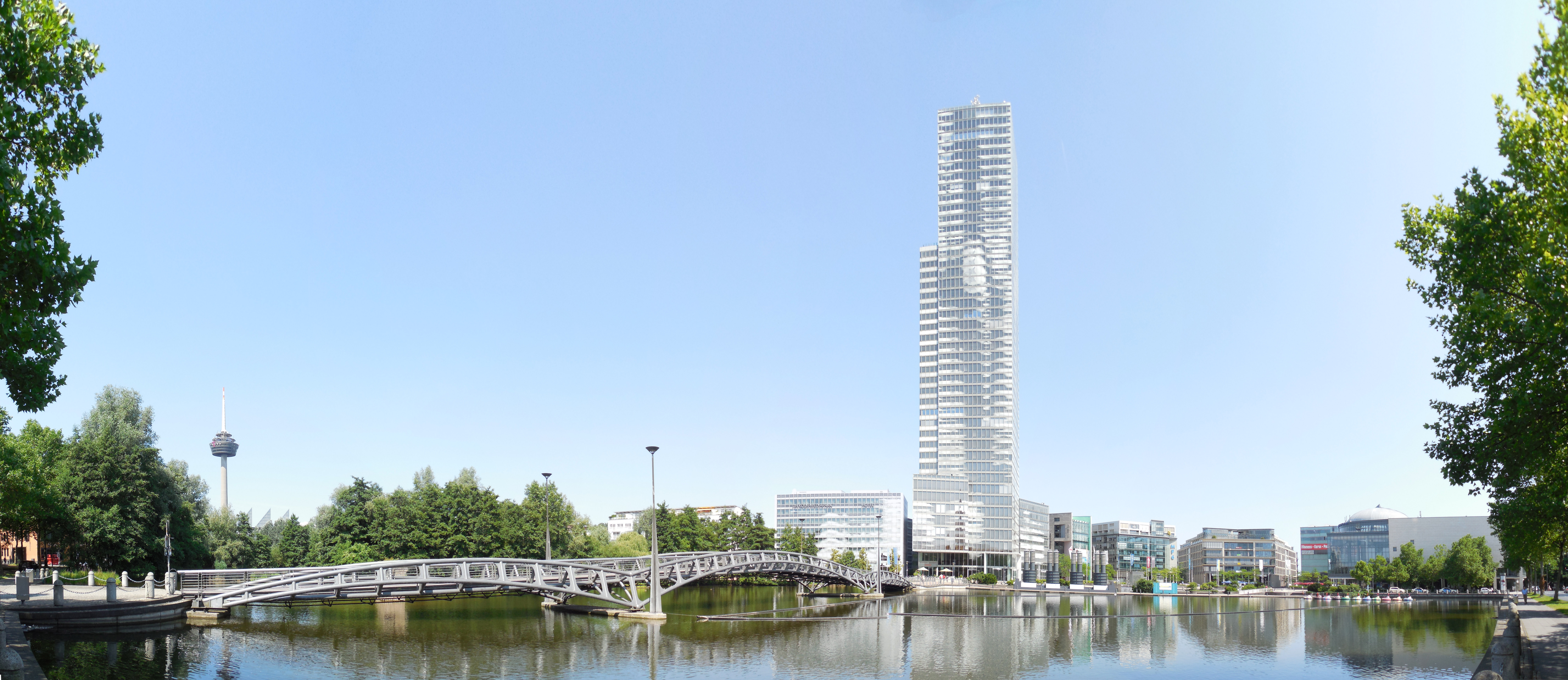
MediaPark with KölnTurm

The MediaPark is an urban regeneration neighborhood in Cologne, Germany, completed by the turn of the millennium. It was set up to accommodate companies of the media and communication industry, as well as cultural institutions, a hotel and some apartment buildings. The MediaPark is situated in Neustadt-Nord, Cologne, on the site of a former goods station, and is some 20 hectares large. The project was designed by Canadian architect Eberhard Zeidler, with construction lasting from 1990 until 2004. The buildings sit radially around a central square, and are surrounded by parks and a small lake. The city quarter's focal point is the 148-metre-tall (486 ft) KölnTurm, designed by French architect Jean Nouvel and completed in 2001.

The MediaPark is home to over 250 companies and a workforce of some 5,000 people. Among the corporate firms at MediaPark are EMI Music Germany, Radio Köln and Westdeutscher Rundfunk studios of 1LIVE; among the cultural institutions are a large multiplex cinema (Cinedom), the Filmbüro Nordrhein-Westfalen, the Fresenius University of Applied Sciences, the musikFabrik and SK Stiftung Köln with the Akademie för uns Kölsche Sproch (Academy for our Kölsch language).

== Public transport ==
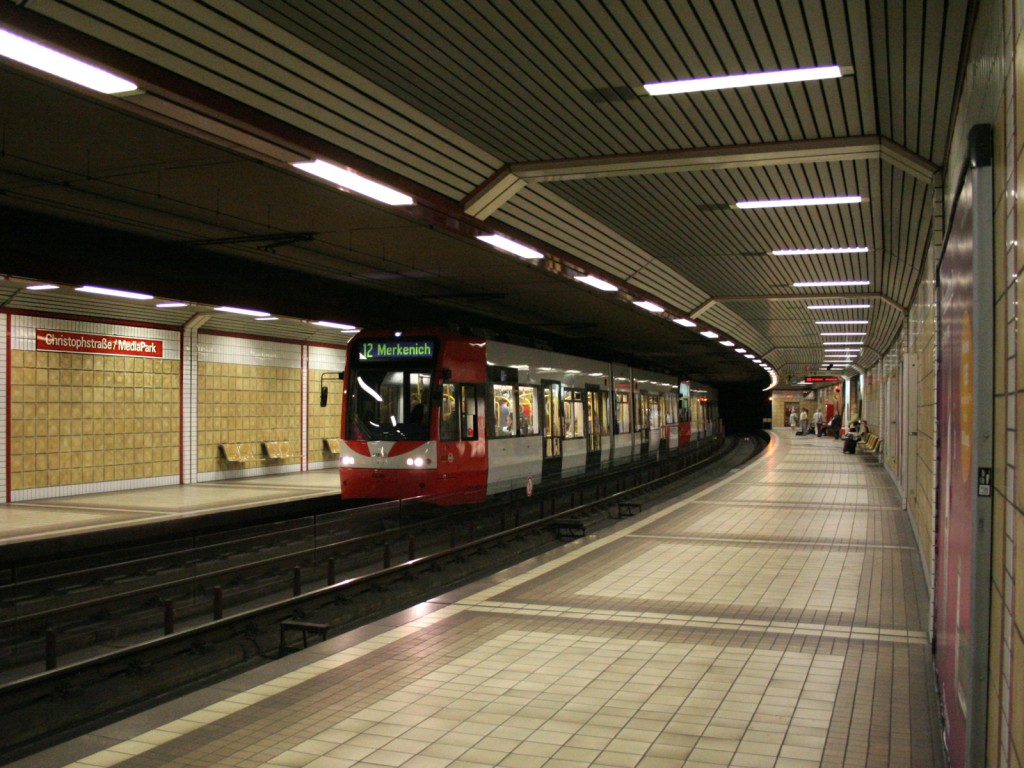
KVB Christophstrasse/Mediapark station

MediaPark is served by the nearby Christophstraße/Mediapark Stadtbahn station, located on the Cologne Ring.

== See also ==
- Districts of Cologne
