= Rheinische Fachhochschule Köln =

School in Cologne, Germany

Coordinates: 50.9332°N 6.9415°E

- Rheinische Fachhochschule Köln
- Type: Private, state-recognized
- Established: 1971
- Affiliations: University of East London (MBA program)
- Students: ~5,700
- Location: Cologne, North Rhine-Westphalia, Germany
- Campus: Urban, multiple sites in Cologne (Neustadt-Süd, Ehrenfeld)
- Website: www.rfh-koeln.de

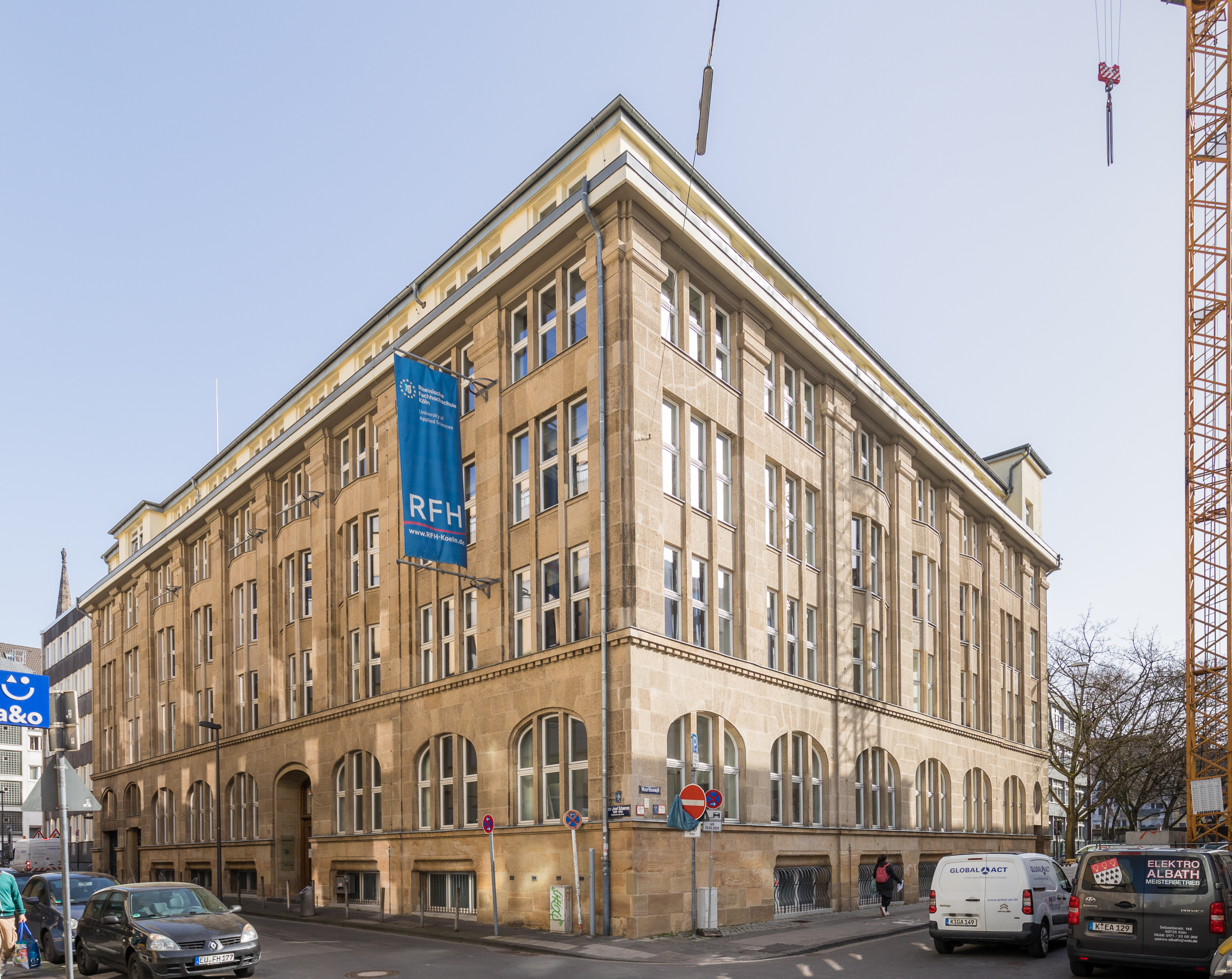
Rheinische Fachhochschule Köln administrative building

Rheinische Fachhochschule Köln (RFH) is a private, state-recognized university of applied sciences located in Cologne, North Rhine-Westphalia, Germany. It was officially established in 1971 and continues the tradition of the Rheinische Ingenieurschule für Bau- und Maschinenbauwesen, which was founded in 1958. The institution offers undergraduate and graduate degree programs in areas such as engineering, business administration, law, social sciences, and health. RFH is organized under private sponsorship and is subject to state supervision according to the Higher Education Act of North Rhine-Westphalia. The university maintains several campuses in Cologne and has a student population of approximately 5,700.

== History ==
The Rheinische Fachhochschule Köln was established in 1958 as the Rheinische Ingenieurschule für Bau- und Maschinenbauwesen in Cologne. The institution was officially recognized by the state of North Rhine-Westphalia in 1966. Following the implementation of the 1969 law regulating universities of applied sciences in the state (Gesetz über die Fachhochschulen im Lande Nordrhein-Westfalen), it was reorganized in 1971 as a university of applied sciences under the name Rheinische Fachhochschule Köln.

Originally operated as a registered non-profit association, it later became a non-profit limited liability company (gemeinnützige GmbH) under the umbrella of the Rheinische Stiftung für Bildung.

In March 2024, the institution adopted the new name Rheinische Hochschule Köln, in line with a broader update to its organizational structure and naming conventions.

== Locations ==
Rheinische Fachhochschule Köln (RFH) operates several sites within the city of Cologne. The main administrative and teaching buildings are located in the Cologne districts of Neustadt-Süd and Ehrenfeld. Instructional facilities are distributed across multiple addresses, including Weyerstraße, Vogelsanger Straße, and Schaevenstraße. All sites are situated within the urban area and are accessible by public transportation. The university does not currently maintain branch campuses outside Cologne.

== Study ==
Rheinische Fachhochschule Köln (RFH) offers accredited undergraduate and postgraduate programs in applied sciences. As of 2024, the institution provides more than 30 degree programs across disciplines including engineering, economics, law, psychology, health sciences, and media studies. Programs are offered in various study formats, including full-time, part-time, and dual study options.

At the undergraduate level, RFH awards degrees such as Bachelor of Arts (B.A.), Bachelor of Science (B.Sc.), and Bachelor of Engineering (B.Eng.). Subjects include electrical and mechanical engineering, business administration, business law, business psychology, media design, and medical economics. These programs are conducted primarily in German.

Postgraduate programs include Master of Arts (M.A.), Master of Science (M.Sc.), Master of Engineering (M.Eng.), and Master of Laws (LL.M.) degrees. Master's programs cover fields such as general management, business psychology, digital business, technical management, tax law, and compliance. A Master of Business Administration (MBA) in International Business is offered in cooperation with the University of East London and is taught in English.

== Research ==
Rheinische Fachhochschule Köln (RFH) conducts applied research in areas related to its academic offerings. Research is organized within individual faculties and dedicated institutes. Activities focus on application-oriented topics in engineering, business, law, and the social sciences.

=== Research Institutes and Areas ===
- Institute for Tool and Production Engineering (iWFT): Conducts research in production technology and manufacturing processes, with a focus on tool development and engineering applications.
- Institute for Compliance and Corporate Governance (ICC): Focuses on compliance, risk management, sustainability, and corporate governance in business and legal contexts.
- Europe-Institute for Experience and Management (METIS): A joint research initiative with FHWien der WKW, engaged in studies on experiential knowledge, organizational development, and knowledge transfer between academia and practice.

=== Collaborative Initiatives ===
- Fit for Invest (EXIST-Potentiale): Participation in a regional project funded by the Federal Ministry for Economic Affairs and Climate Action, supporting investment-readiness among university-affiliated start-ups in Cologne.

All research activities are coordinated in accordance with the legal framework set by the Higher Education Act of North Rhine-Westphalia. Funding is obtained through a combination of institutional support, public research grants, and industry cooperation.

== International ==
The Rheinische Fachhochschule Köln maintains international collaborations with partner institutions and organizations in Europe and beyond. These partnerships support student and faculty mobility, joint projects, and academic exchange. The university participates in programs such as Erasmus+, providing opportunities for students to study or complete internships abroad.

Courses at the university are primarily conducted in German, though selected programs and modules may be available in English. The institution offers support services for international students, including orientation programs and advising.
