= Severinstraße station =

Railway station in Cologne, Germany

Severinstraße
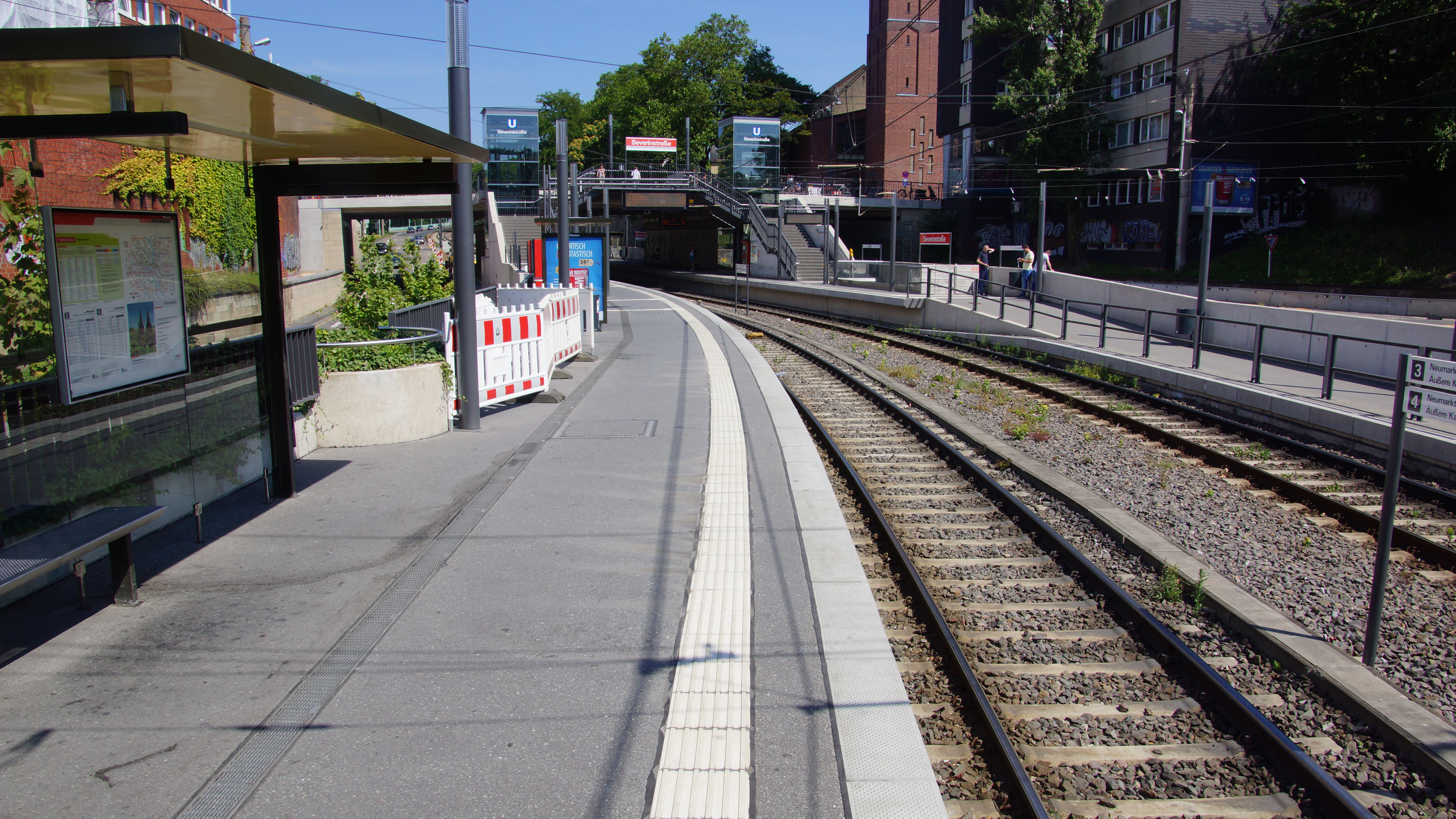
- Severinstraße station at-grade platforms

General information
- Location: Cologne
- Coordinates: 50°55′45″N 06°57′24″E
- Line: North-South Stadtbahn tunnel
- Platforms: 2 side platforms, 1 island platform
- Tracks: 4
- Connections: KVB: 106, 132

Construction
- Structure type: Underground; At-grade
- Accessible: Yes

Other information
- Fare zone: VRS: 2100

History
- Opened: 9 November 1959
- Rebuilt: 2015

Services
Preceding station	Cologne Stadtbahn	Following station
At-grade platforms
Poststraße towards Görlinger-Zentrum	Line 3	Suevenstraße towards Thielenbruch
Poststraße towards Bocklemünd	Line 4	Suevenstraße towards Schlebusch
Underground platform
Terminus	Line 17	Kartäuserhof towards Sürth

Future services
Preceding station	Cologne Stadtbahn	Following station
Underground platform
Heumarkt towards Sparkasse Am Butzweilerhof	Line 5	Kartäuserhof towards Marktstraße
Heumarkt towards Niehl Sebastianstraße	Line 16	Kartäuserhof towards Bad Godesberg Stadthalle
Location

Severinstraße station is a station on the Cologne Stadtbahn lines 3 and 4 and 17. The station consists of two side platforms with two rail tracks on the surface, and an Island platform with two tracks in the underground. The underground platform opened on 13 December 2015 with interim service on line 17. Once the North-South Stadtbahn is finished, lines 5 and 16 will operate through the tunnel, serving the underground station.

== See also ==
- List of Cologne KVB stations
