= Deutz Suspension Bridge =

Bridge in Cologne, Germany

Deutz Suspension Bridge Deutzer Hängebrücke
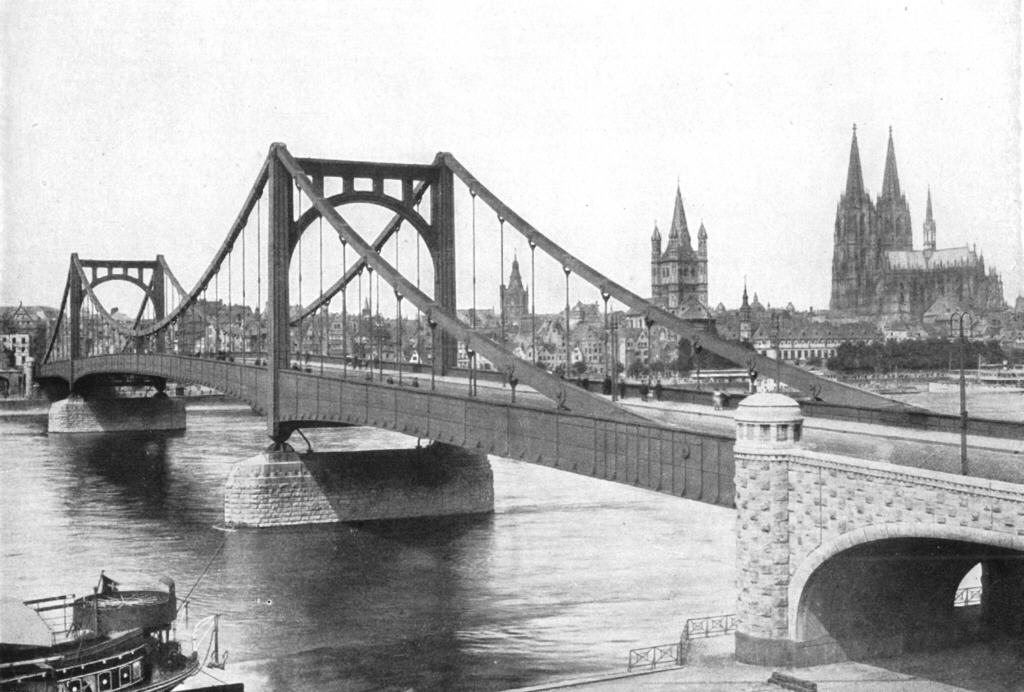
- Deutz Suspension Bridge in 1925
- Coordinates: 50°56′11″N 6°57′57″E
- Carried: motor vehicles, bicycles, and pedestrians
- Crossed: Rhine
- Locale: Cologne
- Other name: Hindenburg Bridge

Characteristics
- Design: suspension
- First section length: 92 m (302 ft)
- Second section length: 185 m (607 ft)
- Third section length: 92 m (302 ft)

History
- Construction start: 1913
- Construction end: 1915
- Collapsed: 28 February 1945
- Replaced by: Deutz Bridge

Location
- Interactive map of Deutz Suspension Bridge

The Deutz Suspension Bridge (German: Deutzer Hängebrücke) was a self-anchored suspension bridge using eyebar chains, located across the Rhine at Deutz in Cologne, Germany. It was built from 1913 to 1915. In 1935, it was named Hindenburg Bridge after Germany's second President died the previous year. It collapsed on 28 February 1945 during repair works and was replaced in 1948 by the Deutz Bridge, the world's first steel box girder bridge, designed by Fritz Leonhardt and Gerd Lohmer. H. D. Robinson, who later worked with David B. Steinman on the Florianopolis Bridge, another eyebar chain bridge, consulted on the towers for the design of this Cologne bridge. It reportedly later served as inspiration for American bridge engineers and was specifically cited as a design influence on the Three Sisters bridges in Pittsburgh, Pennsylvania as well as for the Kiyosu Bridge on the Sumida River in Tokyo.

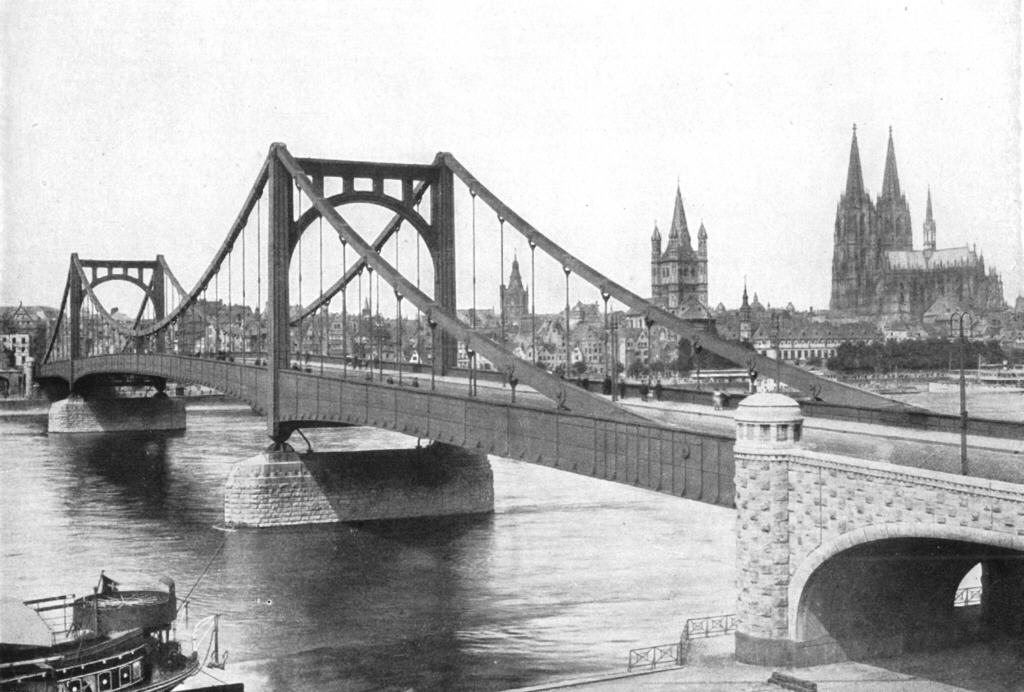
Deutz Suspension Bridge in 1925

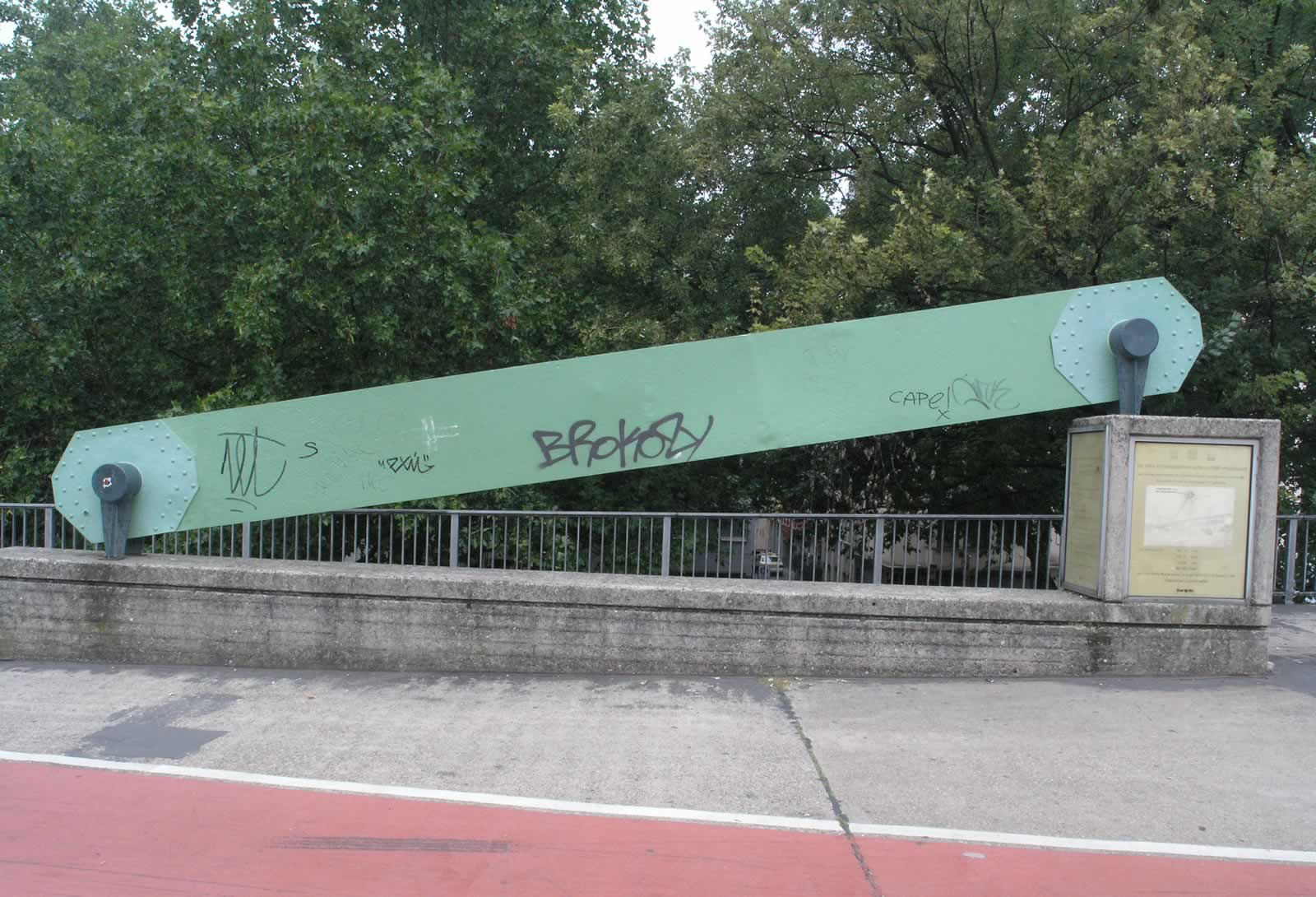
An eyebar of the suspension chains

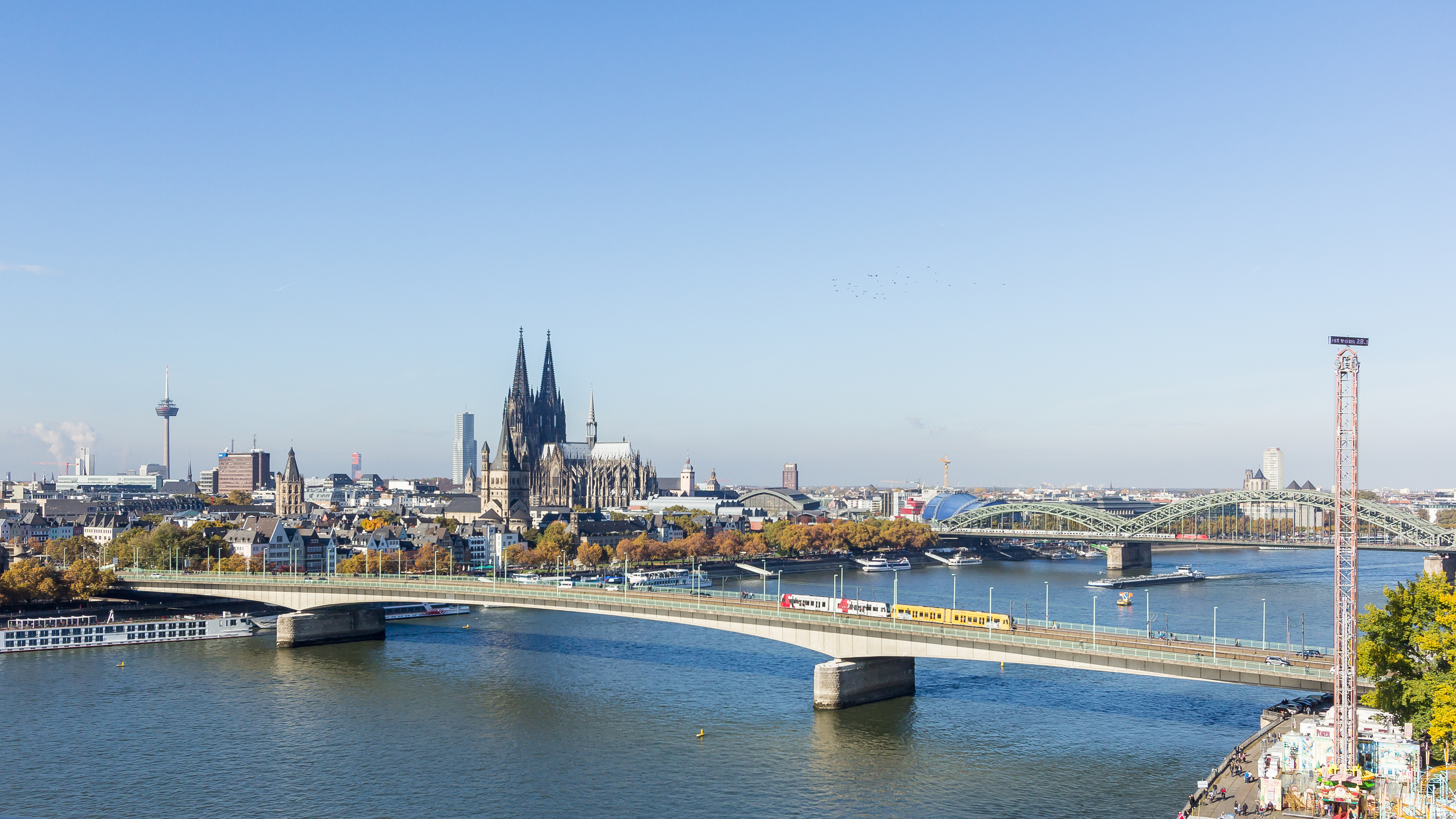
Deutz Bridge, 2016

== Statistics ==
- span lengths: 92 m (302 ft) – 185 m (607 ft) – 92 m (302 ft)
- deck width: 18.7 / 27.50 m (61.4 / 90.2 ft)
