= Marktstraße station =

Stadtbahn station in Cologne, Germany

Marktstraße
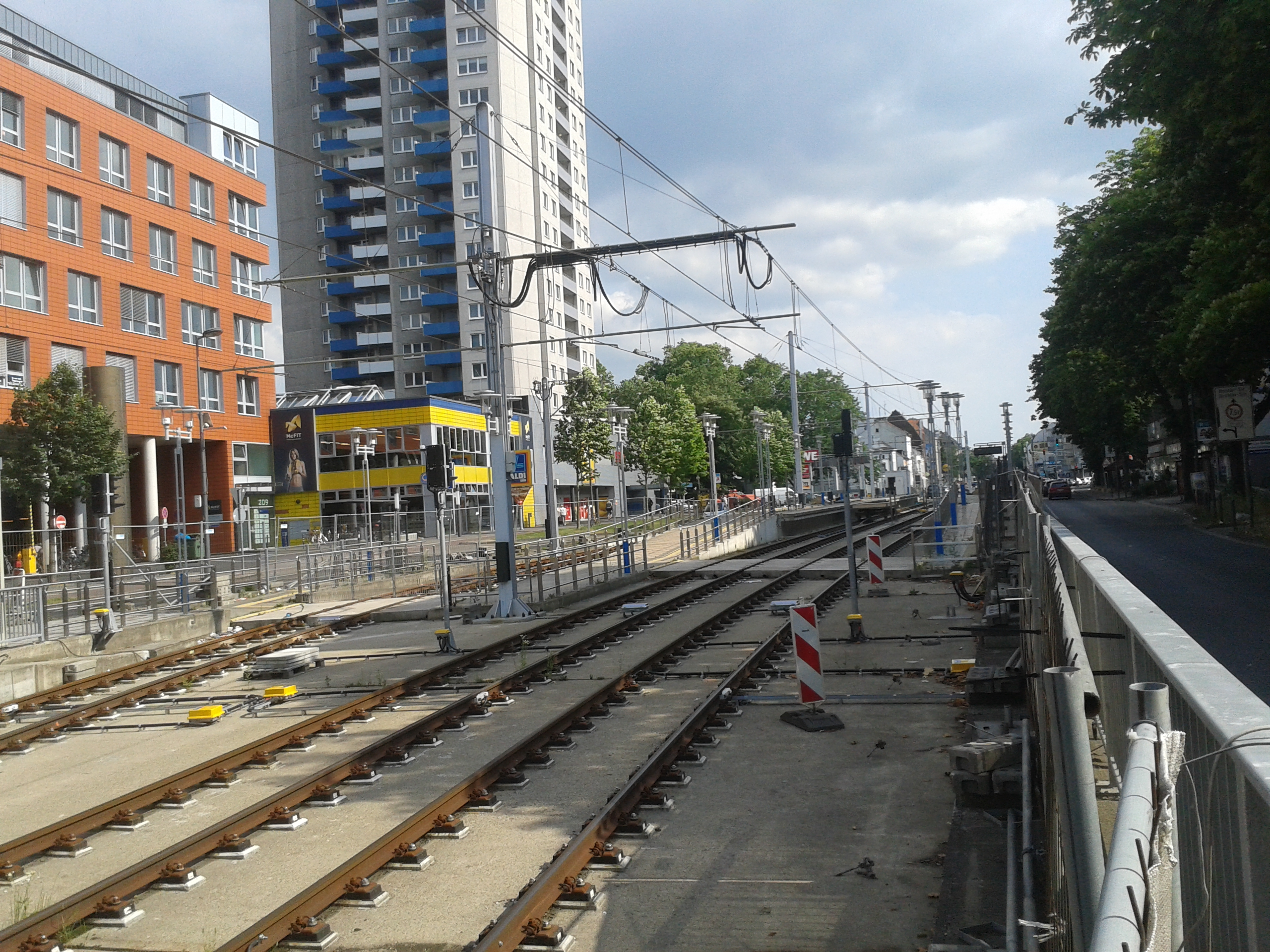
- Marktstraße station under construction in 2015

General information
- Location: Cologne
- Coordinates: 50°54′43″N 06°57′44″E
- Owner: Kölner Verkehrs-Betriebe (KVB)
- Line: North-South Stadtbahn
- Platforms: 2 side platforms, 1 island platform
- Tracks: 3

Construction
- Structure type: At-grade
- Accessible: Yes

Other information
- Fare zone: VRS: 2100

Future services
Preceding station	Cologne Stadtbahn	Following station
Bonner Wall towards Sparkasse Am Butzweilerhof	Line 5	Terminus
Location

Marktstraße station is a future station on Cologne Stadtbahn line 5. It is the most southern underground station on the North-South Stadtbahn project.

== See also ==
- List of Cologne KVB stations
