= Ubierring station =

Railway station in Cologne, Germany

Coordinates: 50°55′20″N 6°57′56″E

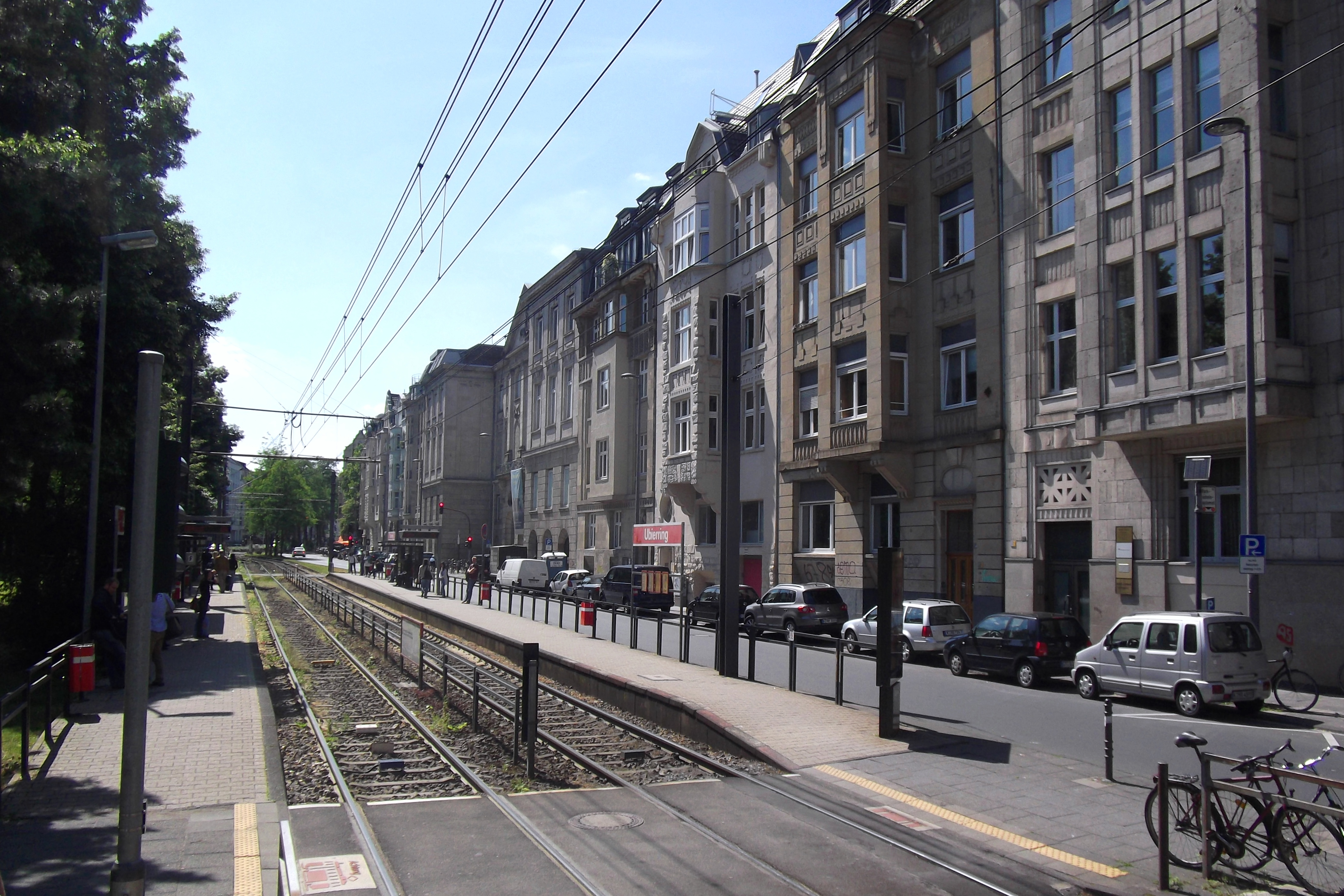
Ubierring station in 2011

Ubierring is a station on the Cologne Stadtbahn lines 15 and 16, located in the Cologne district of Neustadt-Süd. The station lies on Ubierring (part of the Cologne Ring), after which it is named.

The station was opened by the Bonn–Cologne Railway Company in 1905 and consists of two side platforms with two rail tracks.

== See also ==
- List of Cologne KVB stations

Preceding station	Cologne Stadtbahn	Following station
Chlodwigplatz towards Köln-Chorweiler or Longerich Friedhof	Line 15	Terminus
Chlodwigplatz towards Niehl Sebastianstraße	Line 16	Schönhauser Straße towards Bad Godesberg Stadthalle
