= Innenstadt, Cologne =

Innenstadt (1)
- Borough of Cologne
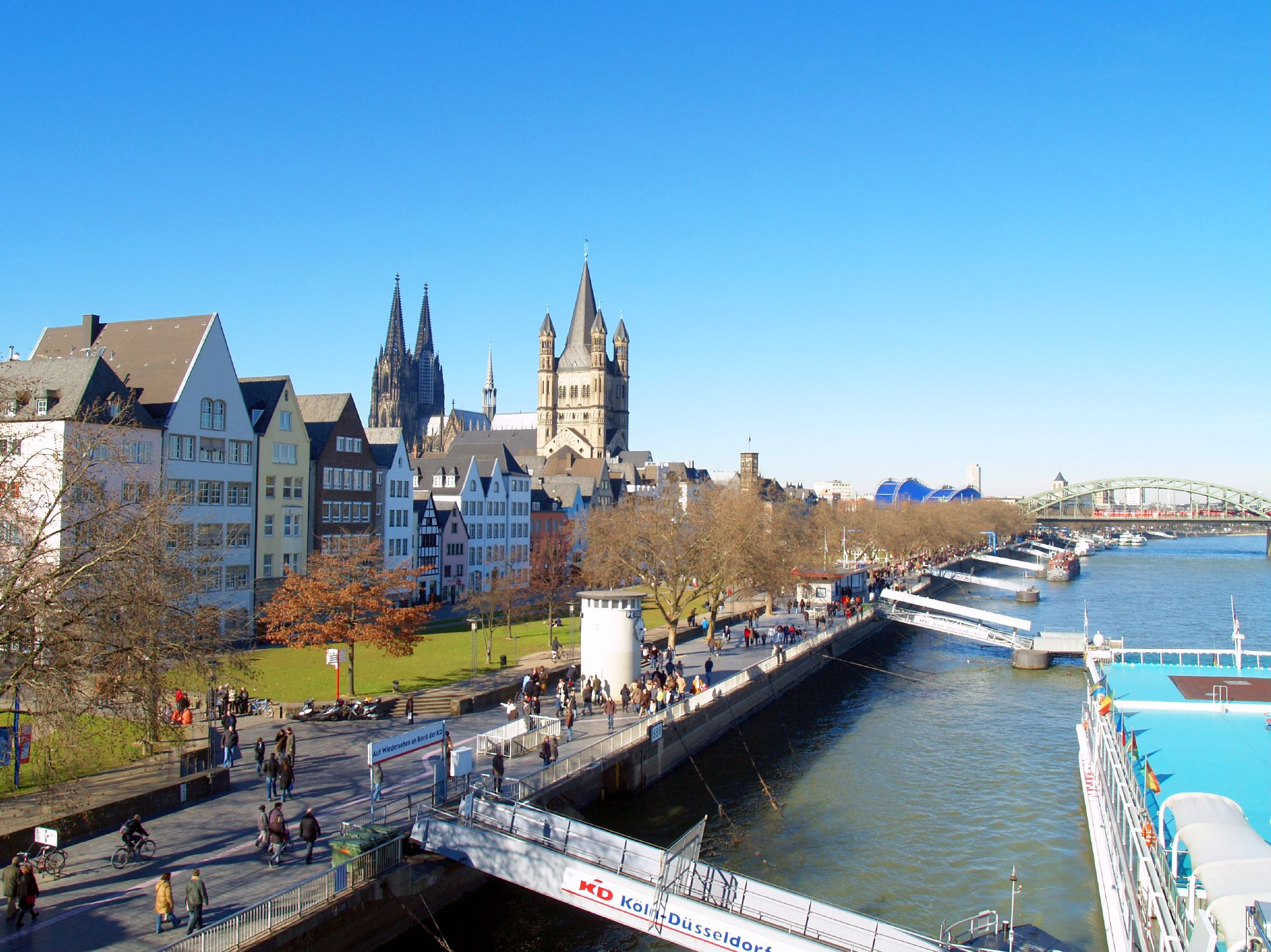
- Rheingarten embankment; visible in the background are Cologne Cathedral (center left) and Groß St. Martin church (center)

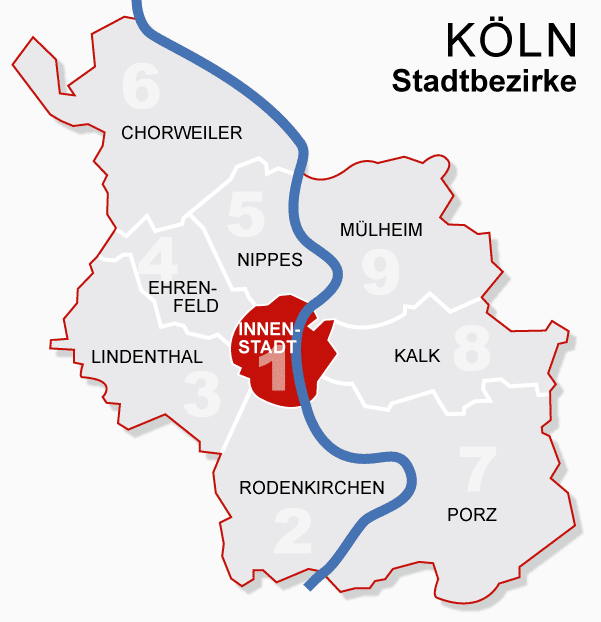
- Location within Cologne
- Interactive map of Innenstadt (1)
- Location within Germany Location within North Rhine-Westphalia
- Coordinates: 50°56′12″N 6°57′37″E
- Country: Germany
- State: North Rhine-Westphalia
- Admin. region: Cologne
- District: Urban district
- City: Cologne

Area
  - Total: 16.37 km^{2} (6.32 sq mi)

Population (2020-12-31)
  - Total: 126,817
  - Density: 7,747/km^{2} (20,060/sq mi)
- Time zone: UTC+01:00 (CET)
  - Summer (DST): UTC+02:00 (CEST)

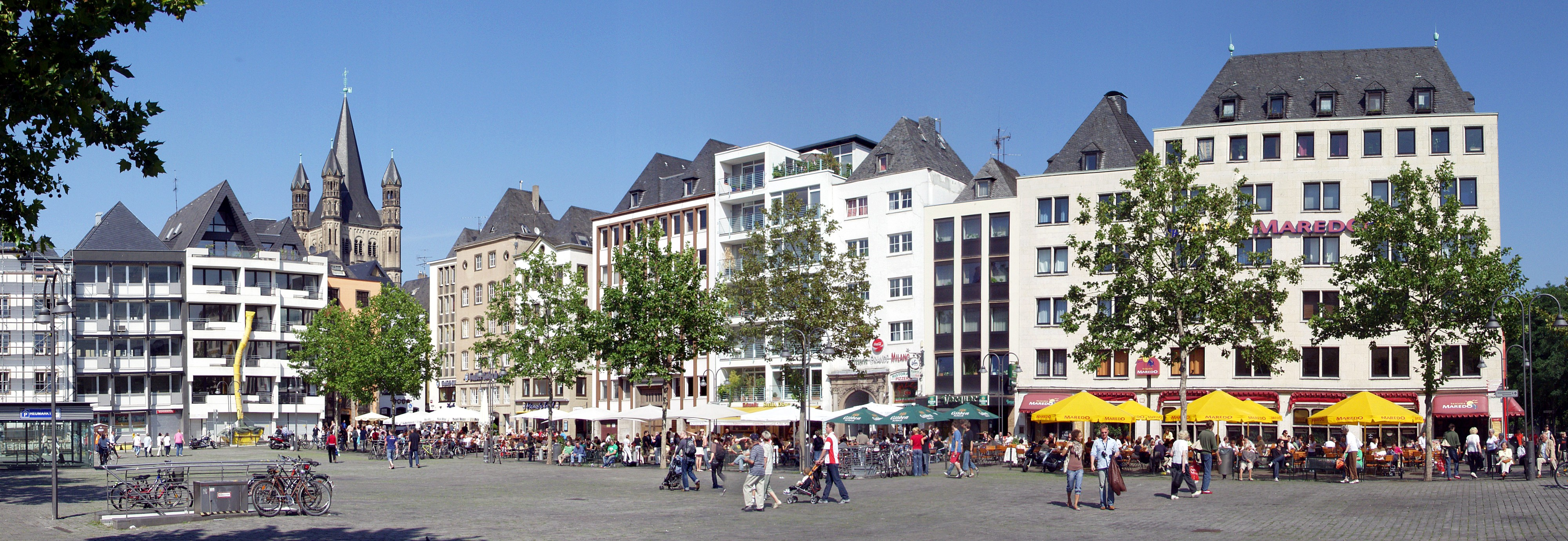
Heumarkt, square in Altstadt-Nord and Altstadt-Süd

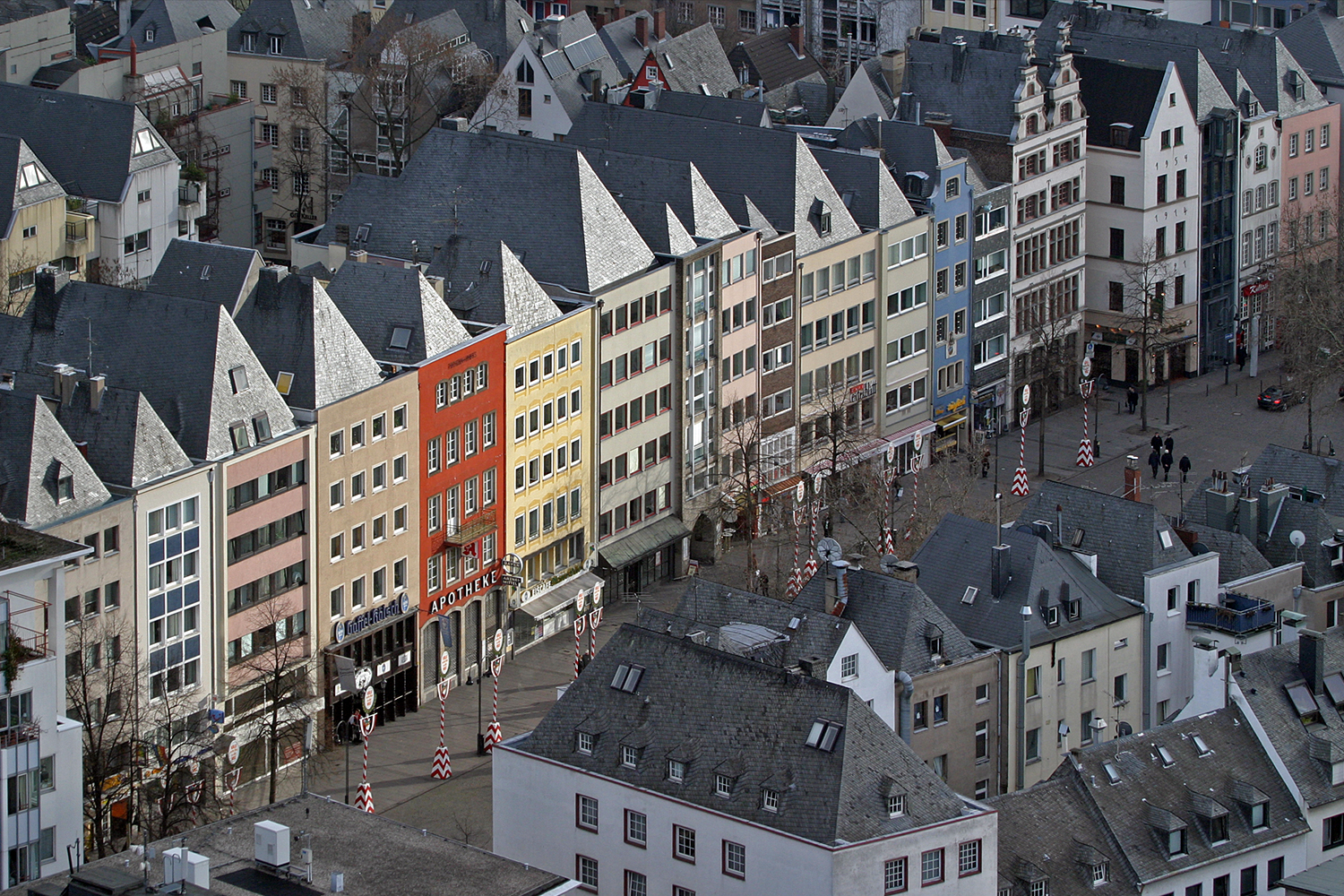
Alter Markt, square in Altstadt-Nord

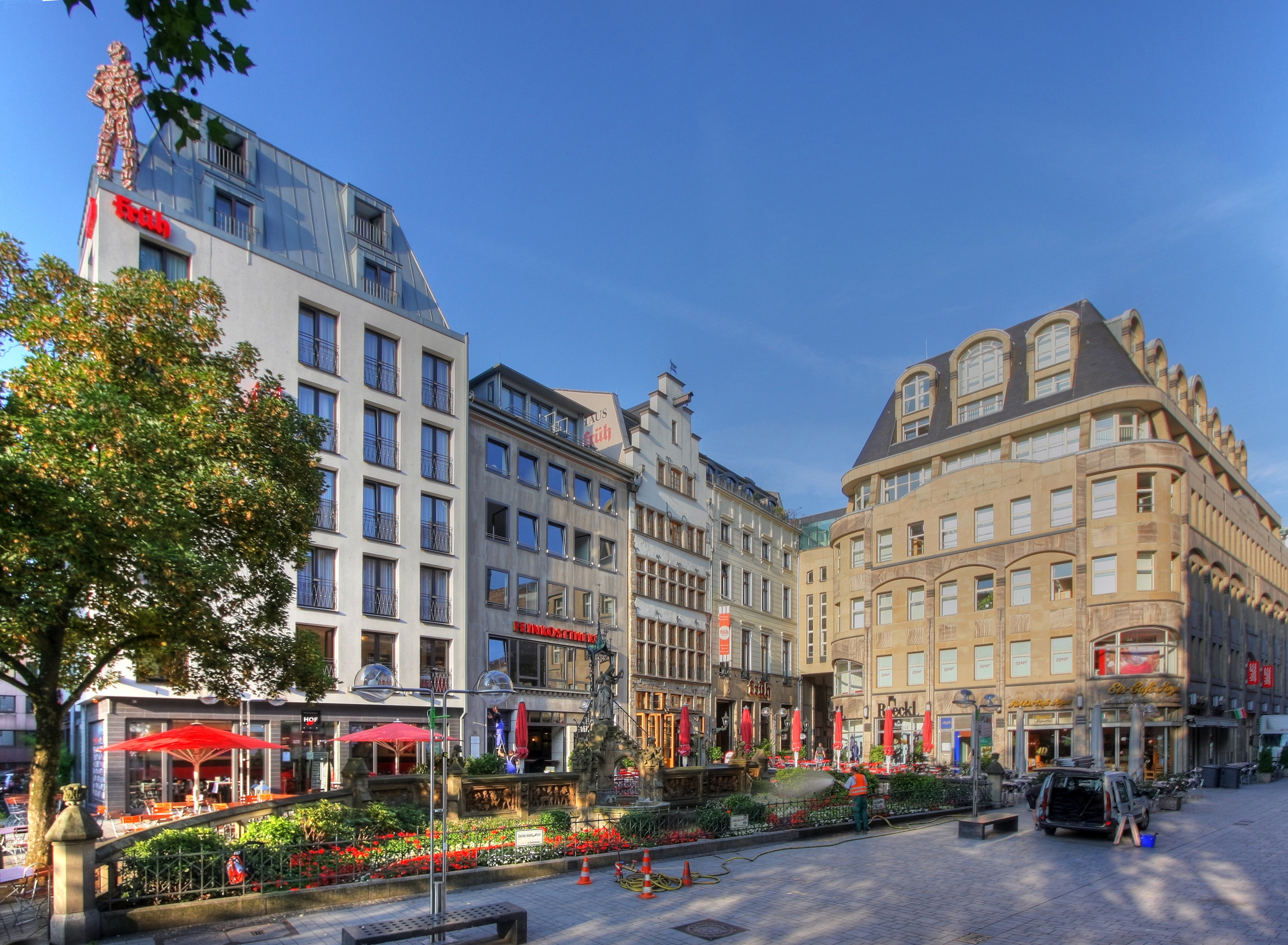
Früh brewery at Am Hof

Innenstadt (German: Köln-Innenstadt German pronunciation: [ˈkœln ˈɪnənˌʃtat], lit. 'Cologne-Inner City') is the central borough (Stadtbezirk) of the City of Cologne in Germany.

The borough was established with the last communal land reform in 1975, and comprises Cologne's historic old town (Altstadt), the Gründerzeit era new town (Neustadt) plus the right-Rhenish quarter of Deutz. The Innenstadt has about 127,000 inhabitants (as of December 2020) and covers an area of 16.37 square kilometres.

== Subdivisions ==
The Innenstadt is made up of five Stadtteile (city parts):

#	City part	Population (2020)	Area (km^{2})	Pop. per km^{2}	map
101	Altstadt-Süd	27,622	2.36	11,852	District map of Innenstadt
102	Neustadt-Süd	37,650	2.82	13,494	District map of Innenstadt
103	Altstadt-Nord	17,976	2.46	7,460	District map of Innenstadt
104	Neustadt-Nord	28,224	3.49	8,206	District map of Innenstadt
105	Deutz	15,345	5.24	2,961	District map of Innenstadt
source: Kölner Stadtteilinformationen 2020

== Landmarks ==
Among the landmarks in Innenstadt are Cologne Cathedral, the twelve romanesque churches of Cologne (St. Andreas, St. Aposteln, St. Cäcilien, St. Georg, St. Gereon, St. Kunibert, St. Maria im Kapitol, St. Maria Lyskirchen, Groß St. Martin, St. Pantaleon, St. Severin and St. Ursula) and the 14th century Cologne City Hall (Kölner Rathaus). Several high rise structures were built over the last years as landmarks for Veedel (city quarters) within the district, most notably KölnTurm at MediaPark and the three Kranhaus buildings at Rheinauhafen.

== Transportation ==
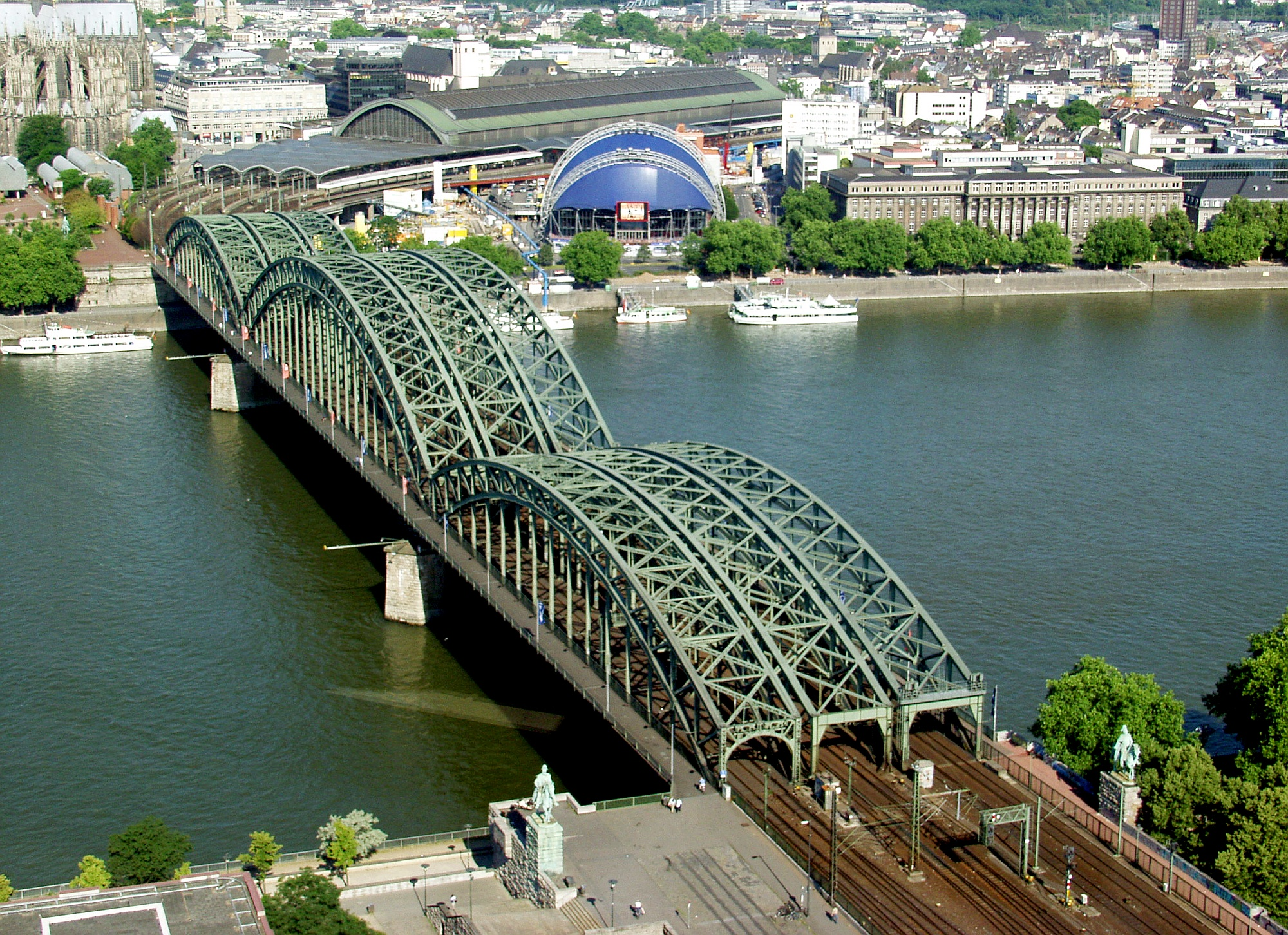
Hohenzollernbrücke

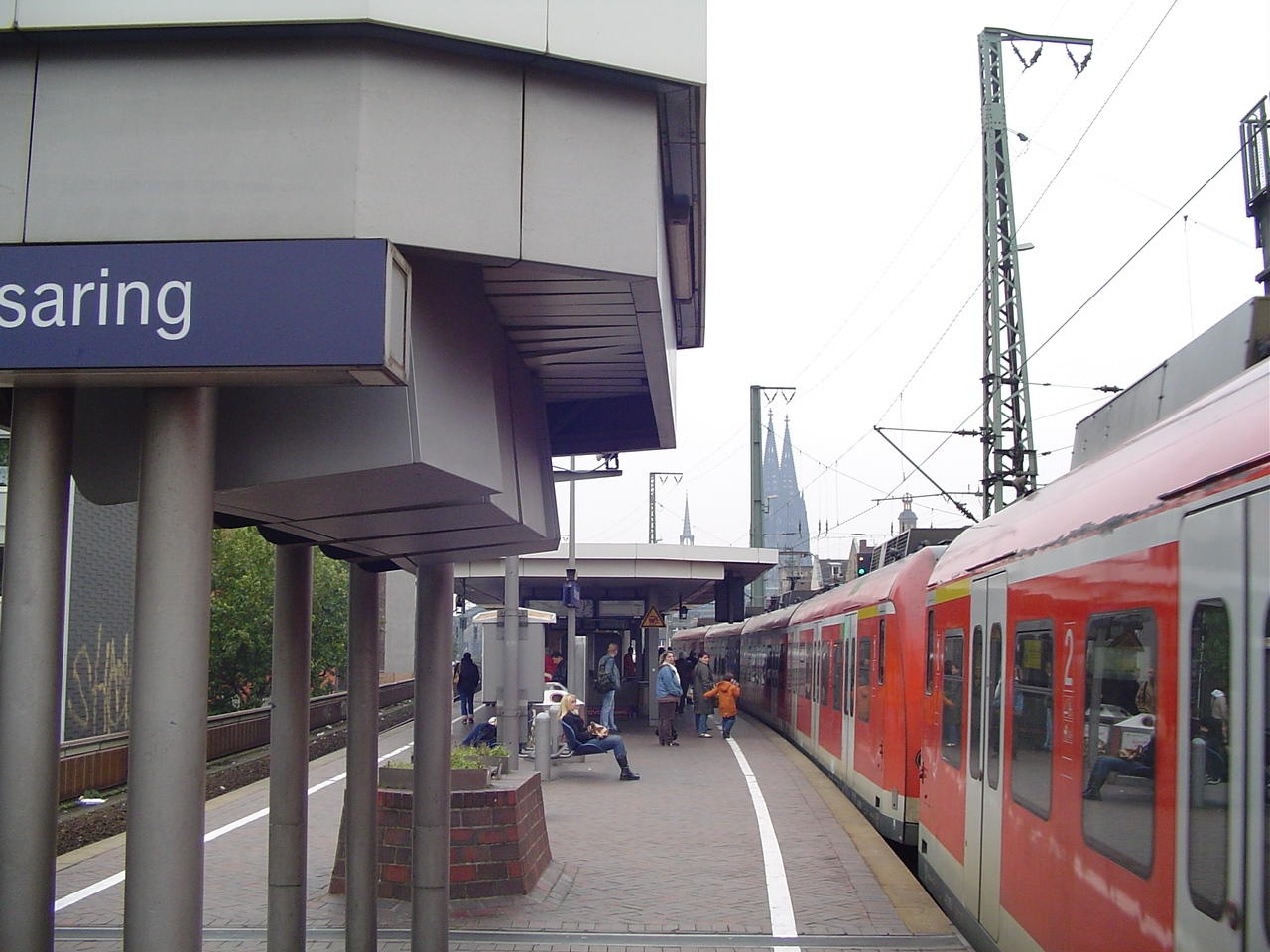
Hansaring station

Breslauer Platz/Hauptbahnhof lightrail station

As the business center of Cologne, the Innenstadt is well served by numerous railway stations and highway. The largest train station is Köln Hauptbahnhof, other stations include Köln Messe/Deutz, Köln Hansaring, Köln West and Köln Süd station, as well as a dense net of Cologne Stadtbahn tram and U-Bahn stations. The Cologne Ring (Kölner Ringe) is a city boulevard, encircling the old town of Cologne. It is part of Bundesstraße 55 and picks up several principal arterial roads, which lead into adjacent city districts.

=== Rhine bridges ===
- B 55a Zoobrücke
- Hohenzollernbrücke
- Deutzer Brücke
- B 55 Severinsbrücke

== See also ==
- History of Cologne
