= Leyendeckerstraße station =

Cologne Metrostation

Leyendeckerstraße
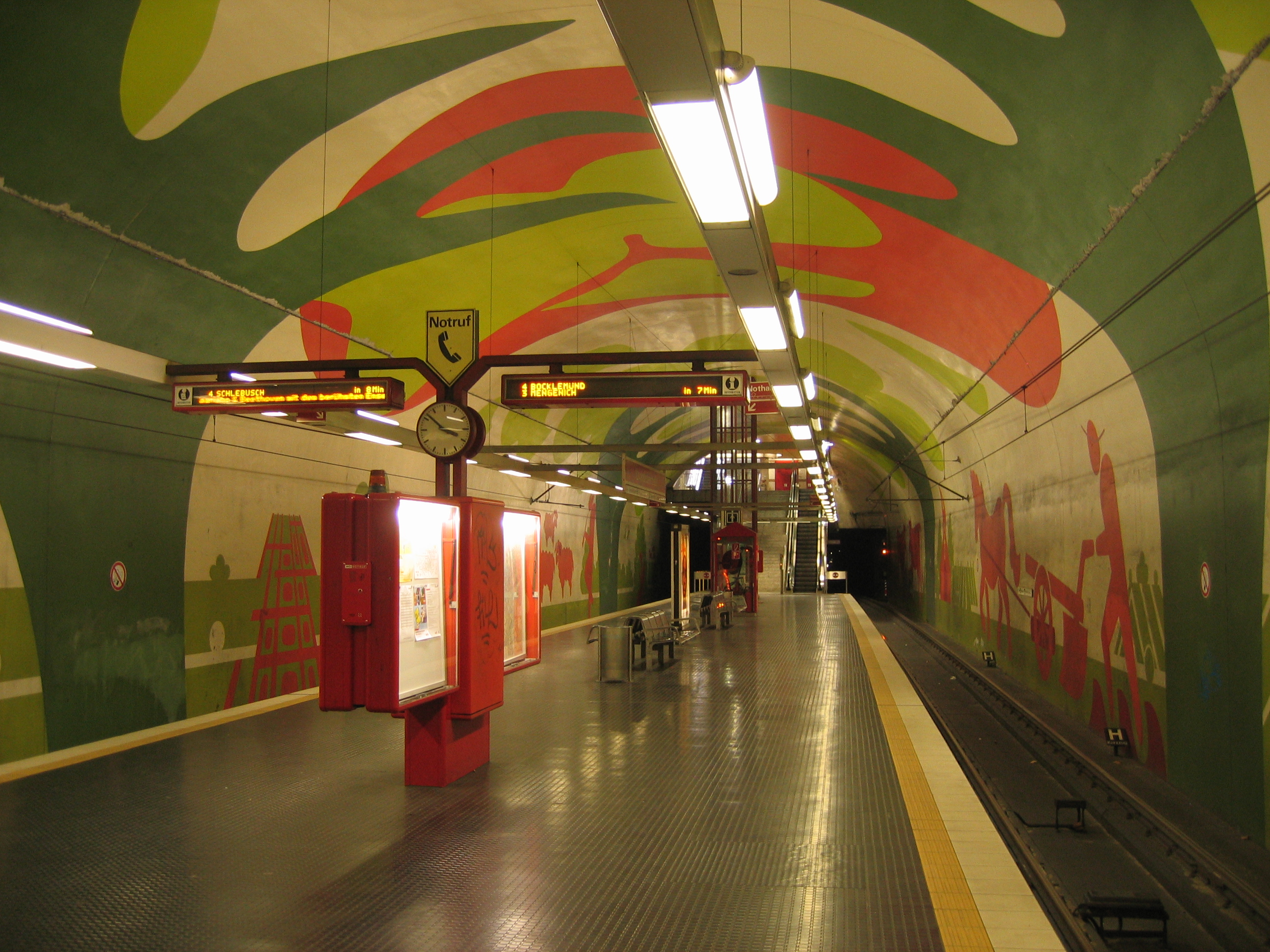
- Leyendeckerstraße station

General information
- Location: Venloer Straße, 50825 Köln
- Coordinates: 50°57′16″N 6°54′35″E
- Owner: Kölner Verkehrs-Betriebe
- Platforms: 1 island platform

Construction
- Structure type: Underground
- Accessible: Yes

Other information
- Fare zone: VRS: 2100

History
- Opened: 1992

Services
Preceding station	Cologne Stadtbahn	Following station
Rochusplatz towards Görlinger-Zentrum	Line 3	Venloer Straße/Gürtel towards Thielenbruch
Rochusplatz towards Bocklemünd	Line 4	Venloer Straße/Gürtel towards Schlebusch
Route map
Location

Leyendeckerstraße is an underground station on the Cologne Stadtbahn lines 3 and 4 in Cologne. The station lies on Venloer Straße, corner Leyendeckerstraße in the district of Ehrenfeld.

The station was opened in 1992 and consists of a mezzanine and one island platform with two rail tracks.

== See also ==
- List of Cologne KVB stations
