= Rochusplatz station =

Underground train station in Cologne, Germany

Rochusplatz
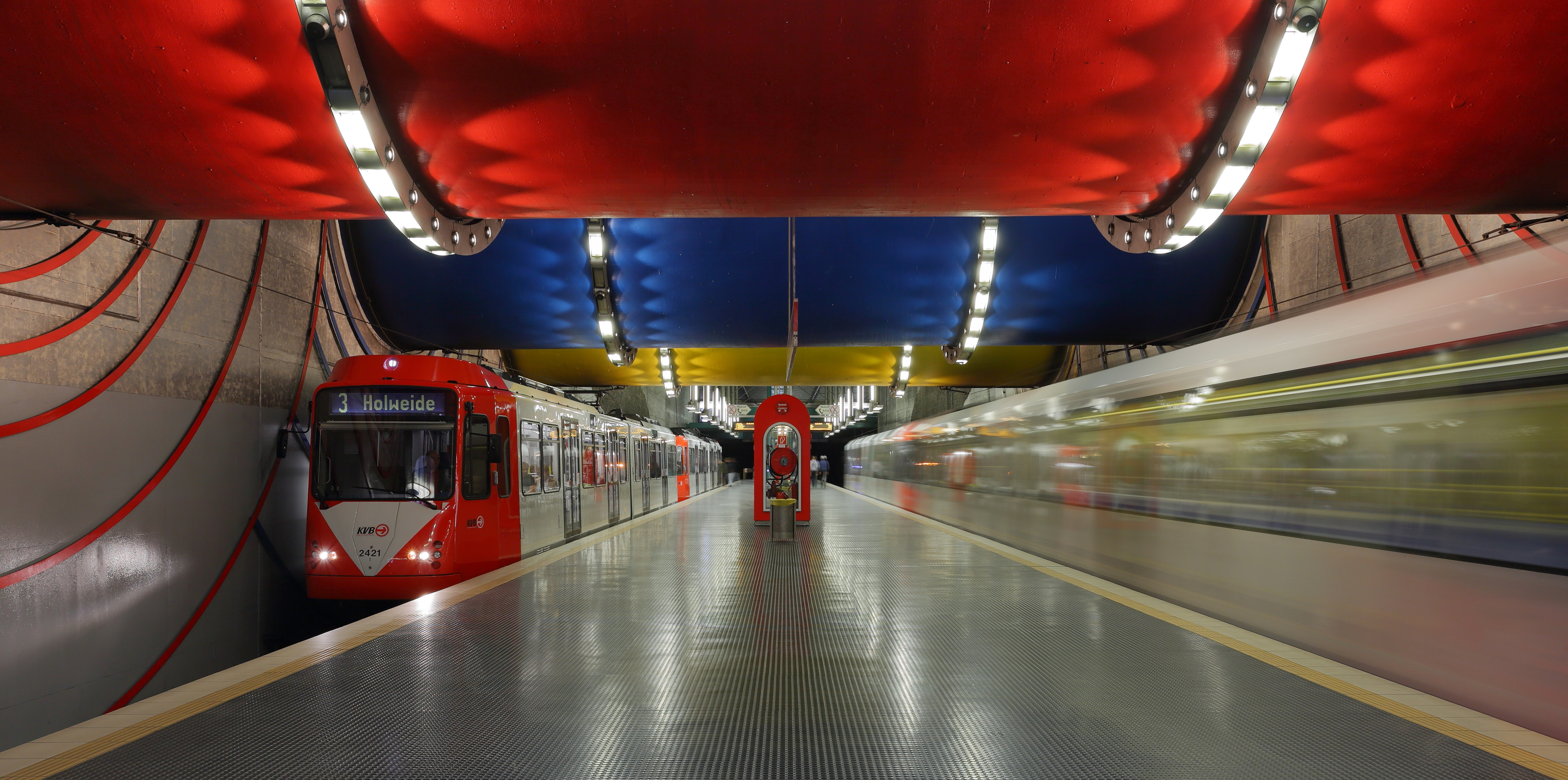
- Äußere Kanalstraße station

General information
- Location: Venloer Straße, 50825 Köln
- Coordinates: 50°57′24″N 06°54′11″E
- Owner: Kölner Verkehrs-Betriebe
- Platforms: 1 island platform
- Connections: Bus, Taxi

Construction
- Structure type: Underground
- Cycle facilities: Call a Bike
- Accessible: Yes

Other information
- Fare zone: VRS: 2100

History
- Opened: 1992

Services
Preceding station	Cologne Stadtbahn	Following station
Akazienweg towards Görlinger-Zentrum	Line 3	Leyendeckerstraße towards Thielenbruch
Akazienweg towards Bocklemünd	Line 4	Leyendeckerstraße towards Schlebusch
Route map
Location

Rochusplatz is an underground station on the Cologne Stadtbahn lines 3 and 4 in Cologne. The station is located on Venloer Straße at its intersection with Äußere Kanalstraße in the district of Ehrenfeld.

The station was opened in 1992 and consists of a mezzanine and one island platform with two rail tracks.

The station renamed Äußere Kanalstraße to Rochusplatz on 15 December 2019.

== See also ==
- List of Cologne KVB stations
