= Akazienweg station =

Railway station in Cologne, Germany

Akazienweg
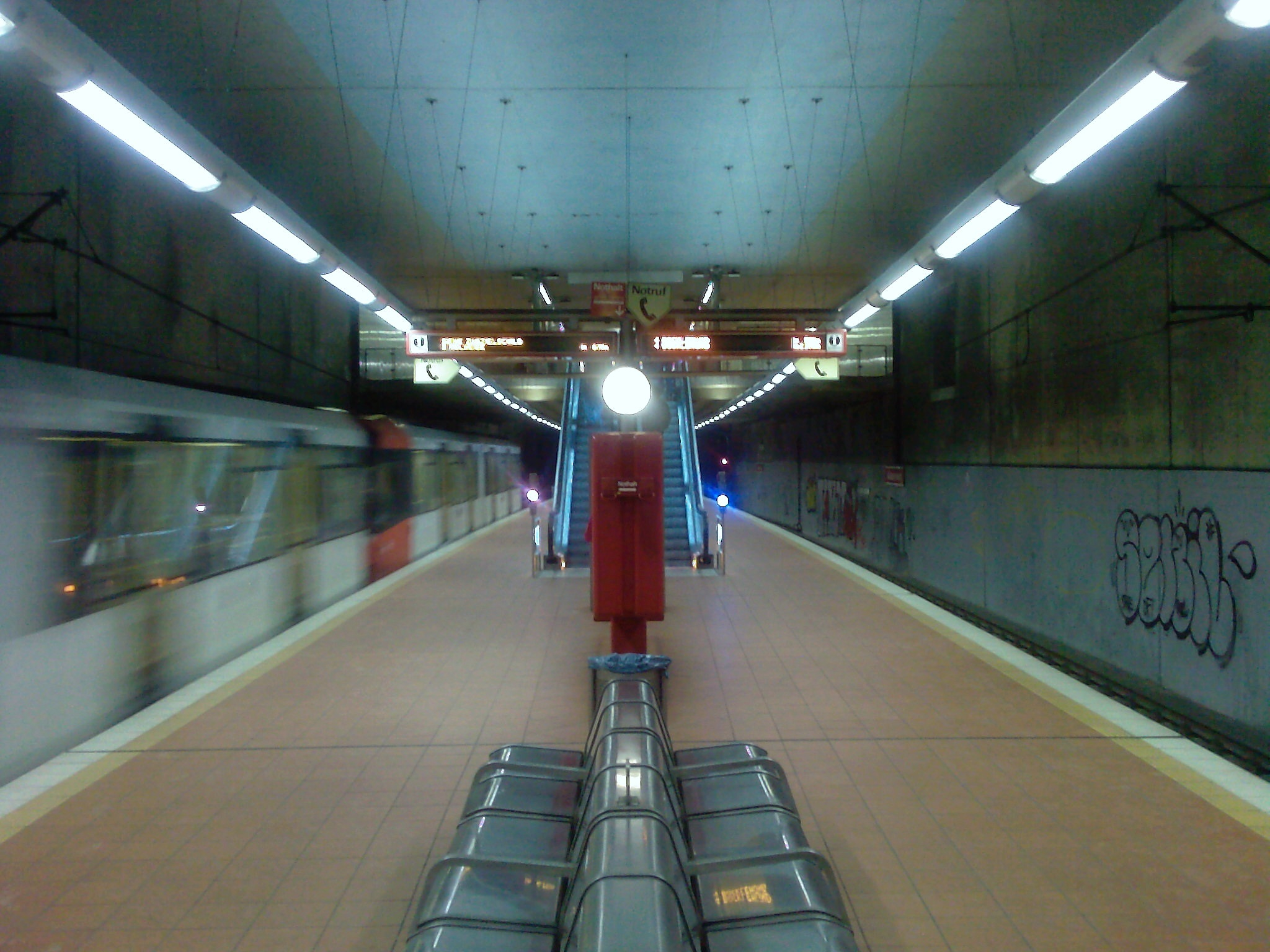
- Akazienweg station

General information
- Location: Venloer Straße, 50827 Köln
- Coordinates: 50°57′41″N 6°53′34″E
- Owner: Kölner Verkehrs-Betriebe
- Platforms: 1 island platform

Construction
- Structure type: Underground
- Accessible: Yes

Other information
- Fare zone: VRS: 2100

History
- Opened: 1992

Services
Preceding station	Cologne Stadtbahn	Following station
Wolffsohnstraße towards Görlinger-Zentrum	Line 3	Rochusplatz towards Thielenbruch
Wolffsohnstraße towards Bocklemünd	Line 4	Rochusplatz towards Schlebusch
Route map
Location

Akazienweg is an underground station on the Cologne Stadtbahn lines 3 and 4 in Cologne. The station lies on the intersection of Venloer Straße and Akazienweg streets in the district of Ehrenfeld.

The station was opened in 1992 and consists of a mezzanine and one island platform with two rail tracks.

== See also ==
- List of Cologne KVB stations
