= Ehrenfeld, Cologne =

Ehrenfeld
- Borough of Cologne
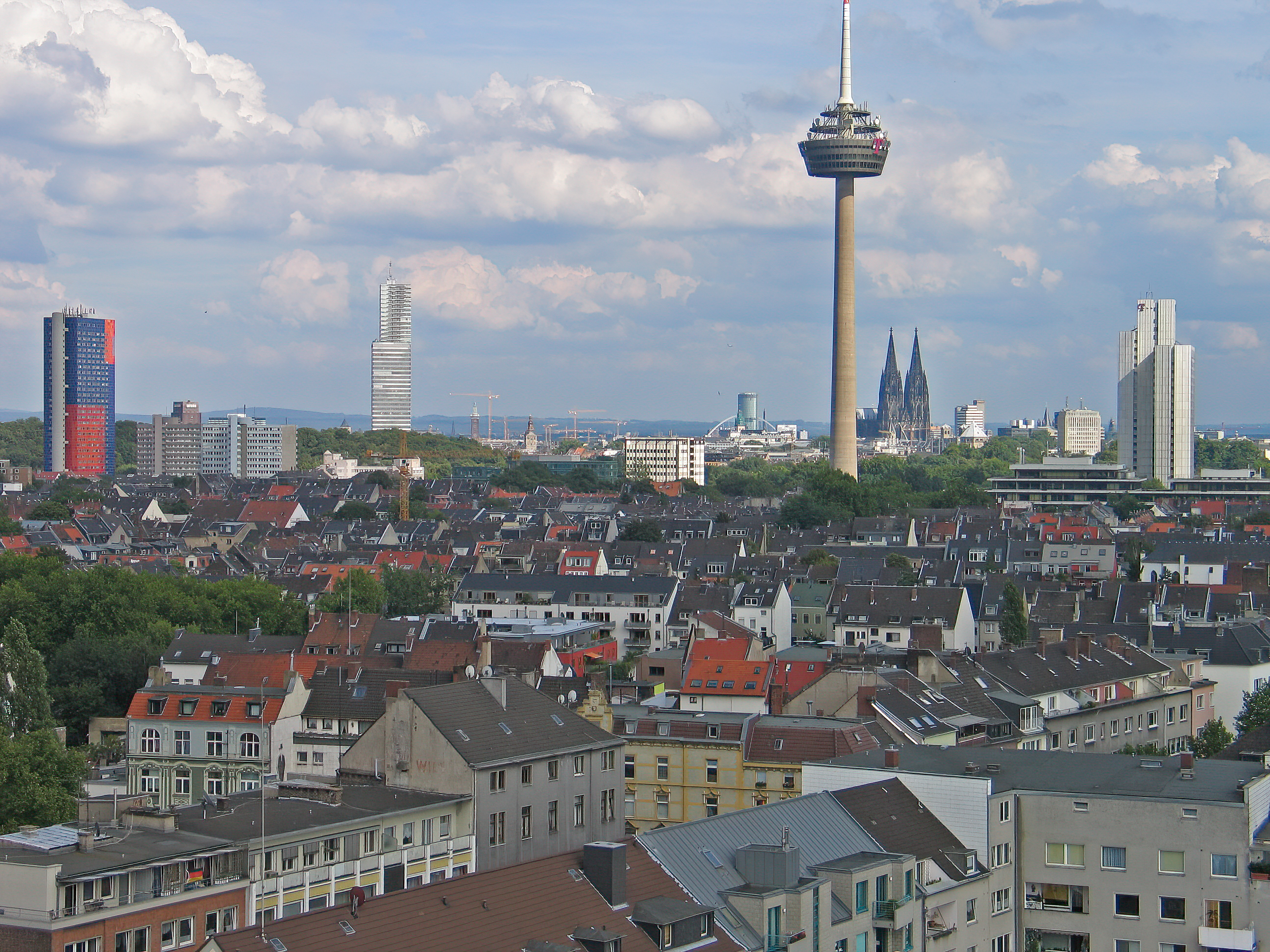
- Aerial view of Ehrenfeld with the Colonius telecommunications tower in the background

- Coat of arms

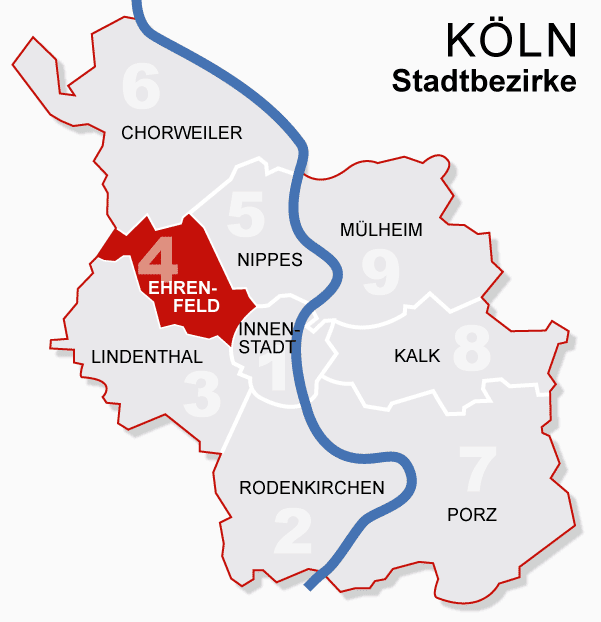
- Location within Cologne
- Interactive map of Ehrenfeld
- Location within Germany Location within North Rhine-Westphalia
- Coordinates: 50.9464°N 6.91833°E
- Country: Germany
- State: North Rhine-Westphalia
- Admin. region: Cologne
- District: Urban district
- City: Cologne

Area
  - Total: 23.98 km^{2} (9.26 sq mi)

Population (2020-12-31)
  - Total: 109,498
  - Density: 4,566/km^{2} (11,830/sq mi)
- Time zone: UTC+01:00 (CET)
  - Summer (DST): UTC+02:00 (CEST)

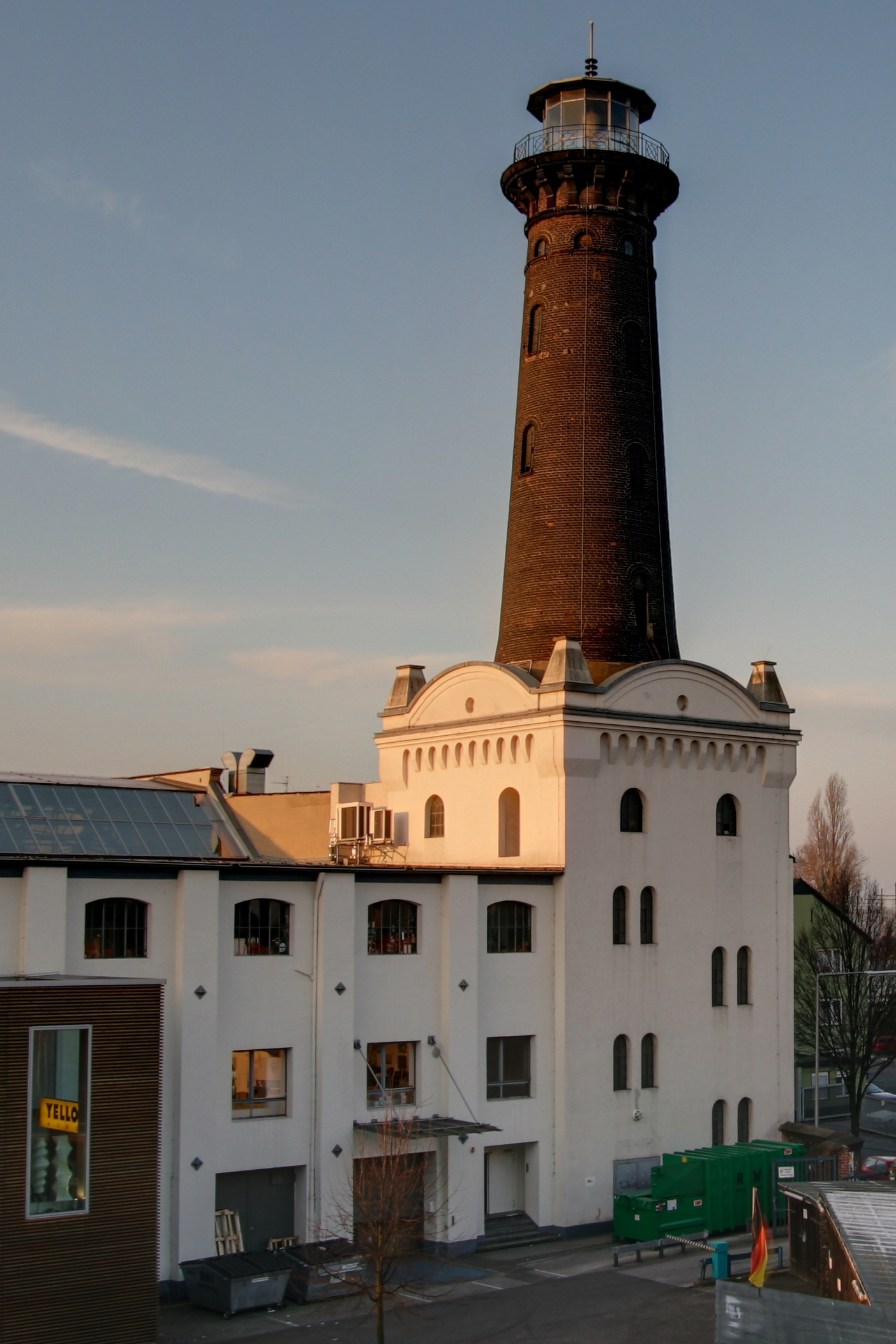
Helios-Lighthouse in Cologne-Ehrenfeld

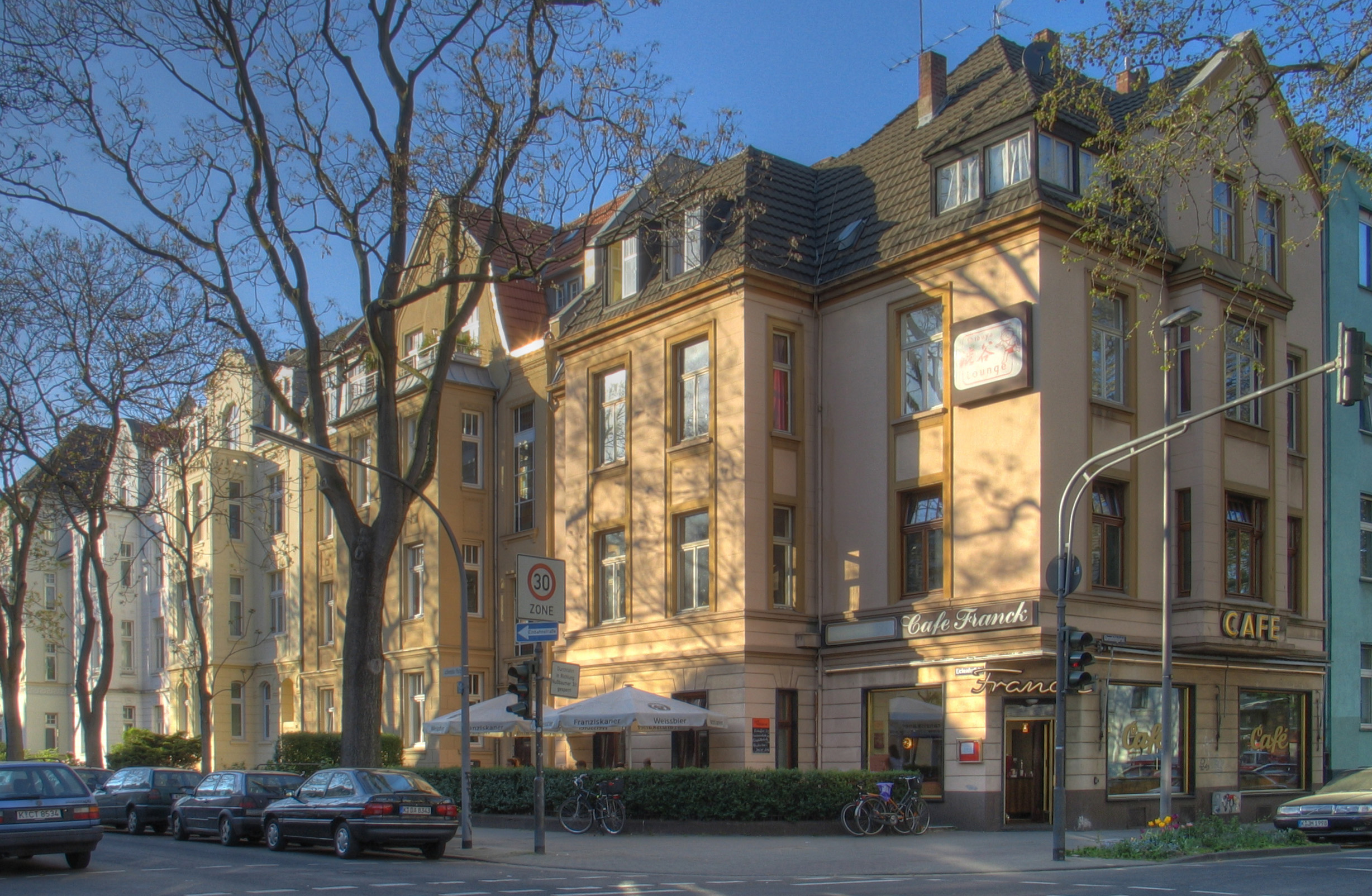
Typical street in Neuehrenfeld

Ehrenfeld (German: Köln-Ehrenfeld [kœln ˈʔeːʁənfɛlt]; Kölsch: Ihrefäld [ˈíʁəfɛlt]) is a borough (Stadtbezirk) of the City of Cologne in Germany. It includes the seven quarters Bickendorf, Bocklemünd, Mengenich, Ehrenfeld, Neuehrenfeld, Ossendorf and Vogelsang. It has about 109,500 inhabitants (as of December 2020) and covers an area of 23.98 square kilometres. The district borders with the Cologne districts of Chorweiler to the North, Nippes and Innenstadt to the East and Lindenthal to the South-West.

Ehrenfeld is characterized by residential areas and shopping streets, the media center "Coloneum" has production and movie studios, and a cultural scene with many artists' studios, theatres and clubs.

The landmark of Ehrenfeld is the Helios-lighthouse and the old factory of the perfume manufacturer 4711.

== History ==
Ehrenfeld got its name from the quarter Ehrenfeld, which represents the center of the borough. Ehrenfeld grew substantially during the Gründerzeit boom, became a municipality in 1867 and a town in 1879. Nine years later, Ehrenfeld became part of the city of Cologne. During summer and autumn of 1944 an anti-Nazi resistance group, known as the Ehrenfeld Group, operated from Ehrenfeld.

== Subdivisions ==
Ehrenfeld consists of six Stadtteile (city parts):

#	City part	Population (2009)	Area (km^{2})	Pop. per km^{2}	map
401	Ehrenfeld	35,488	3,72	9,536	District map of Ehrenfeld
402	Neuehrenfeld	23,387	2,55	9,170	District map of Ehrenfeld
403	Bickendorf	16,276	2,31	7,046	District map of Ehrenfeld
404	Vogelsang	8,028	3,66	2,192	District map of Ehrenfeld
405	Bocklemünd/Mengenich	10,563	4,93	2,141	District map of Ehrenfeld
406	Ossendorf	9,966	6,81	1,463	District map of Ehrenfeld
source: Die Kölner Stadtteile in Zahlen 2010 (in German)

== Transportation ==
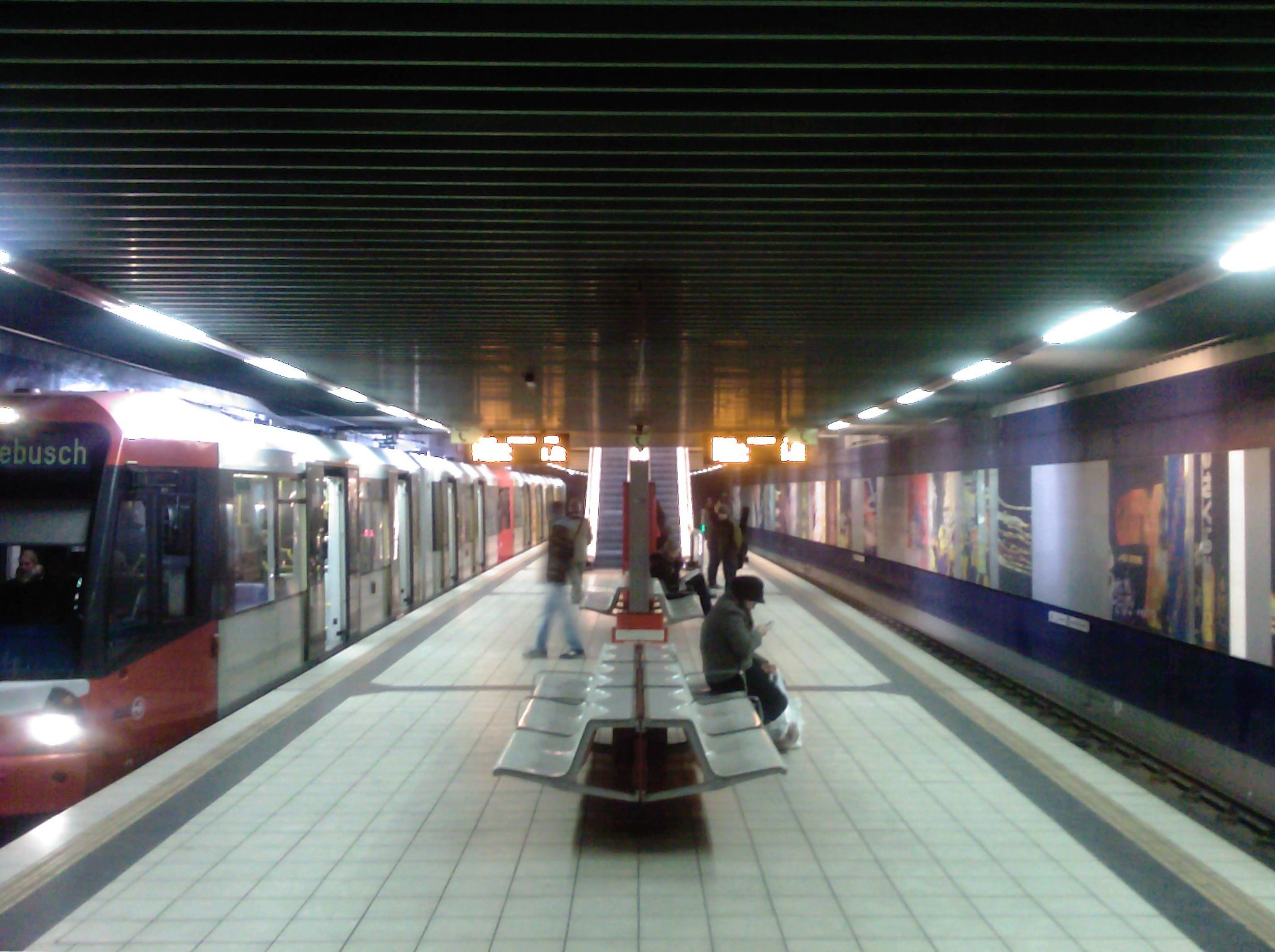
Piusstraße station

Bike and Ride (B+R) faciality at Cologne-Ehrenfeld train station

The borough is connected to the city centre of Cologne by numerous light rail stations of Cologne Stadtbahn line 3, 4, 5 and 13. The Bundesautobahn 57 connects Ehrenfeld with the Cologne Beltway, Venloer Straße is the district's principal road leading onto the Cologne Ring. The Köln-Ehrenfeld station (Bahnhof Ehrenfeld) connects the borough to the regional rail network.

map	KVB station	lines			
	Bocklemünd	3	4		
	Westfriedhof	3	4		
	Wolffsohnstraße	3	4		
	Akazienweg	3	4		
	Äußere Kanalstraße	3	4		
	Leyendeckerstraße	3	4		
	Venloer Straße/Gürtel	3	4		13
	Körnerstraße	3	4		
	Piusstraße	3	4		
	Hans-Böckler-Platz/Bf West	3	4	5	
