= Köln-Ehrenfeld station =

Railway station in Cologne, Germany

Köln Ehrenfeld
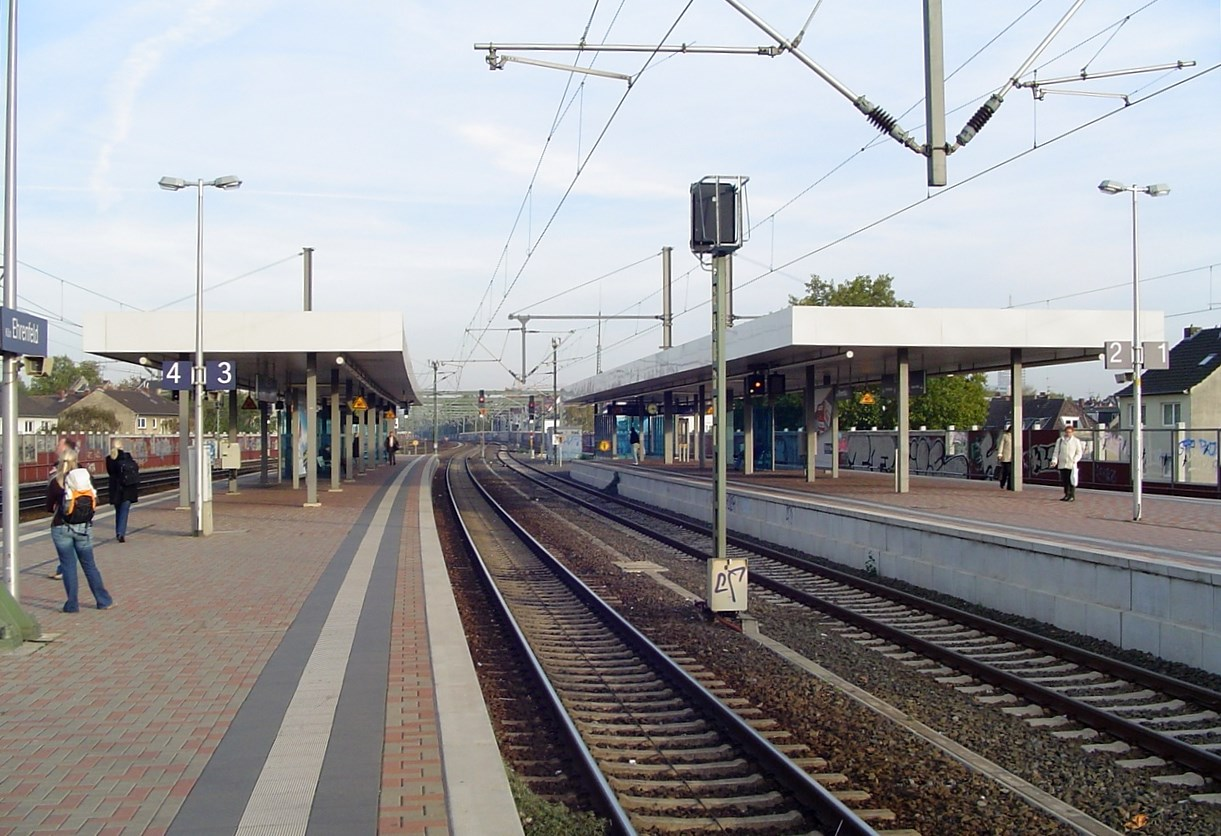
- Köln-Ehrenfeld station

General information
- Location: Stammstr. 1, Ehrenfeld, Cologne, NRW; Germany
- Coordinates: 50°57′06″N 6°55′04″E
- Owner: Deutsche Bahn
- Operator: DB Netz; DB Station&Service
- Line: Cologne–Aachen
- Platforms: 4

Construction
- Accessible: Yes

Other information
- Station code: 3330
- DS100 code: KKER
- IBNR: 8000208
- Category: 4
- Fare zone: VRS: 2100
- Website: www.bahnhof.de

History
- Opened: 1860/72

Services
Preceding station	DB Fernverkehr	Following station
Mönchengladbach Hbf towards Amsterdam Centraal	ICE 78	Köln Hbf towards München Hbf
Preceding station	National Express Germany	Following station
Horrem towards Aachen Hbf	RE 1 (NRW-Express)	Köln Hbf towards Hamm (Westf) Hbf
Preceding station	DB Regio NRW	Following station
Pulheim towards Mönchengladbach Hbf	RE 8	Köln Hbf towards Koblenz Hbf
Horrem towards Aachen Hbf	RE 9	Köln Hbf towards Siegen Hbf
Pulheim towards Mönchengladbach Hbf	RB 27	Köln Hbf towards Koblenz Hbf
Quadrath-Ichendorf towards Bedburg	RB 38	Köln Hbf towards Köln Messe/Deutz
Preceding station	Cologne S-Bahn	Following station
Köln-Müngersdorf Technologiepark towards Horrem	S12	Köln Hansaring towards Au (Sieg)
Köln-Müngersdorf Technologiepark towards Düren	S19	Köln Hansaring towards Au (Sieg)

Connections to other stations
Preceding station	Cologne Stadtbahn	Following station
Leyendeckerstraße towards Görlinger-Zentrum	Line 3 transfer at Venloer Straße/Gürtel	Körnerstraße towards Thielenbruch
Leyendeckerstraße towards Bocklemünd	Line 4 transfer at Venloer Straße/Gürtel	Körnerstraße towards Schlebusch
Weinsbergstraße/Gürtel towards Sülzgürtel	Line 13 transfer at Venloer Straße/Gürtel	Subbelrather Straße/Gürtel towards Holweide Vischeringstraße
Location

Köln-Ehrenfeld is a railway station situated at Ehrenfeld, Cologne in western Germany on the Cologne–Aachen railway. It was opened with the first part of the line in 1839. It is served by Cologne S-Bahn and regional services. Not far from the station is the Venloer Straße/Gürtel underground station of the Cologne Stadtbahn.

== Station ==
Köln-Ehrenfeld station has two platforms with four platform tracks, to the north of which there are two tracks without a platform for through passenger and freight trains. Tracks 1 and 2 are used for S-Bahn traffic, tracks 3 and 4 for regional traffic. Cologne-Ehrenfeld is a scheduled stop for all regional services passing through it. It is served by Cologne S-Bahn lines S12 between Düren or Köln-Ehrenfeld and Troisdorf every 20 minutes and S19 between Düren and Hennef (Sieg), Blankenberg (Sieg), Herchen or Au (Sieg) every 20 minutes Monday–Saturday. Together these provide services every 10 minutes through Cologne Monday–Saturday and four services an hour on Sunday. It is also served by the NRW-Express (RE1), Rhein-Erft-Express (RE8), Rhein-Sieg-Express (RE9), Rhein-Erft-Bahn (RB27) and Erft-Bahn (RB38), all running hourly.

== Venloer Straße/Gürtel station ==
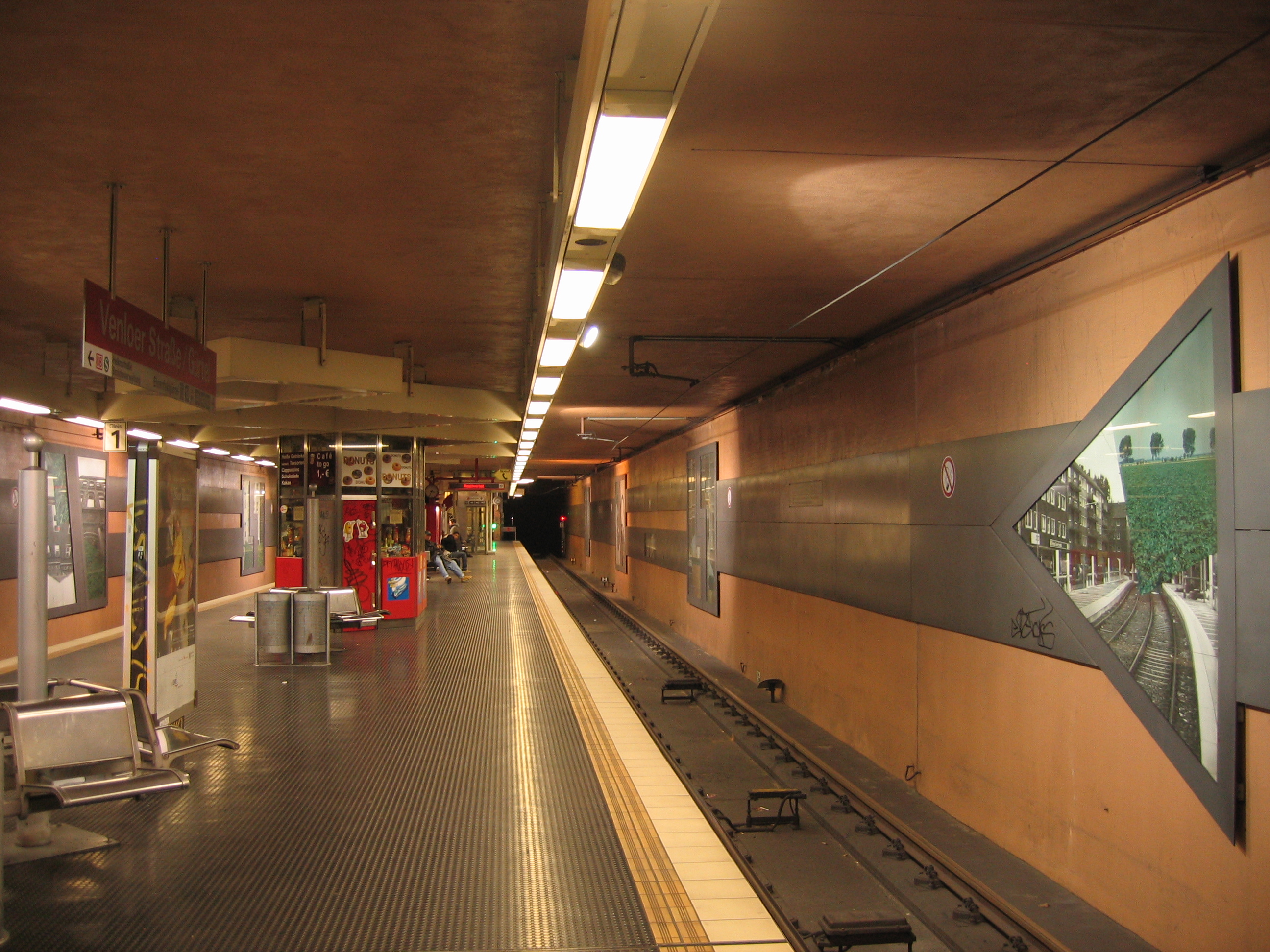
Venloer Straße/Gürtel underground station

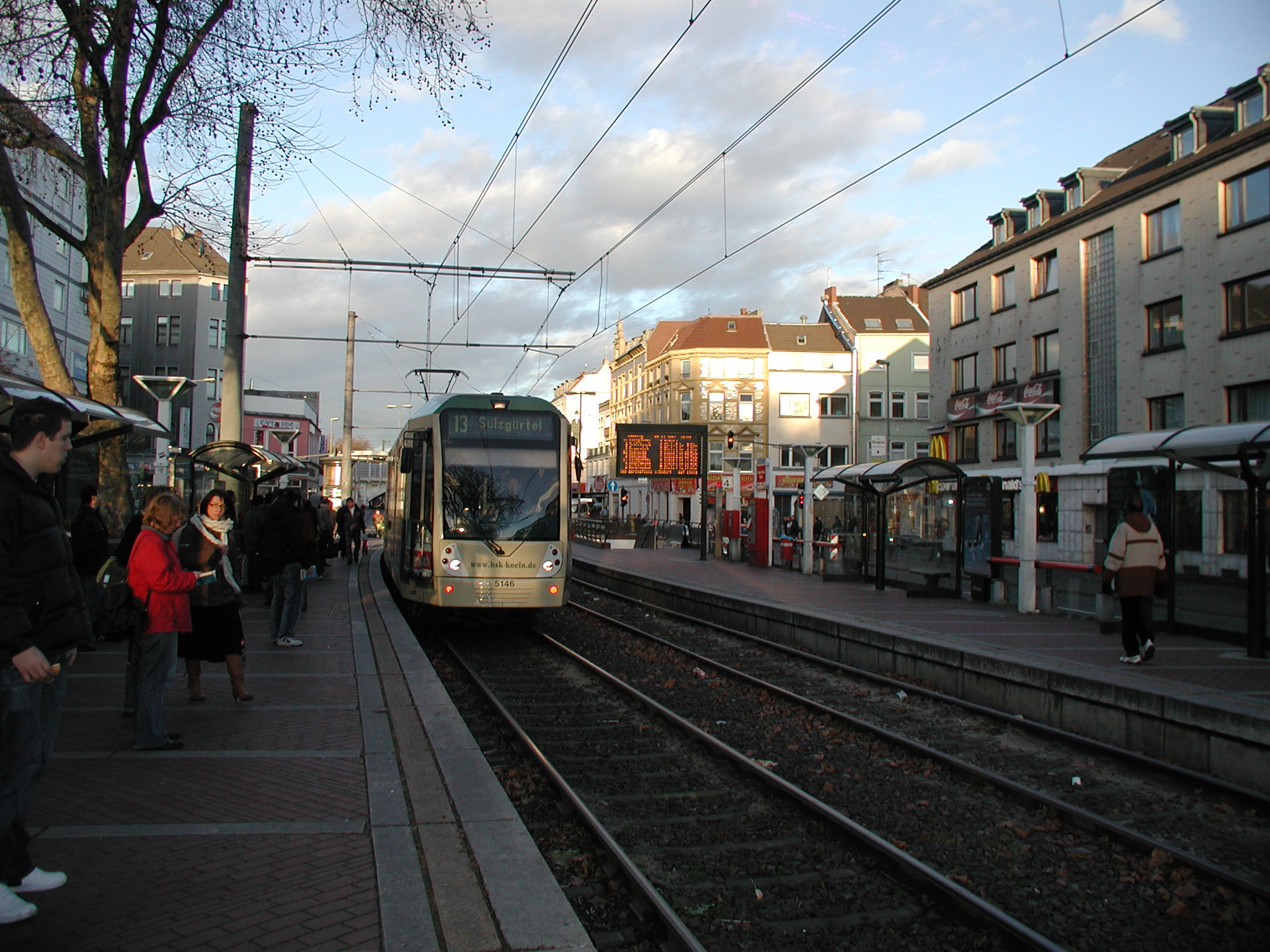
Venloer Straße/Gürtel at-grade station

Within reach of a walking distance of some 100m, Ehrenfeld station is linked to Venloer Straße/Gürtel urban light rail station. This station offers connections on three Cologne Stadtbahn lines.

== History ==
Köln-Ehrenfeld station was built with the construction of the first section of the Cologne–Aachen high-speed railway in 1839.
