= List of Cologne KVB stations =

KVB logo

This is a list of KVB light rail stations of the Cologne Stadtbahn system. The system covers the city of Cologne, as well as several surrounding cities (Bergisch Gladbach, Bonn, Bornheim, Brühl, Frechen, Hürth, Leverkusen-Schlebusch, Wesseling) and is operated and owned by KVB (Kölner Verkehrs-Betriebe, Cologne transit authority).

The KVB is a member of the Verkehrsverbund Rhein-Sieg (VRS - Rhein-Sieg Transit Authority, formed in 1987 with transit authorities in Bonn to consolidate the transit authorities in the Cologne/Bonn region and operate a joint fare structure). The KVB system includes a total of 236 stations, of which 10 are elevated and 42 are underground stations.

== Stations ==
Stations not in Cologne have their location in parentheses.

| * | Transfer stations |
| † | Terminals |
| ** | Transfer station and terminal |

| 1 | 3 | 4 | 5 | 7 | 9 | 12 | 13 | 15 | 16 | 17 | 18 | station | interchange | structure | opened |
|---|---|---|---|---|---|---|---|---|---|---|---|---|---|---|---|
| 1 | | | | 7 | | | 13 | | | | | Aachener Straße/ Gürtel * | | at-grade | |
| | 3 | 4 | | | | | | | | | | Akazienweg * | | underground | 1992 |
| | | | | | | | | | | | 18 | Alfter/Alanus Hochschule (Alfter) | Bonn Stadtbahn | at-grade | |
| | | | 5 | | | | | | | | | Alter Flughafen Butzweilerhof | | at-grade | |
| 1 | | | | | | | | | | | | Alter Militärring | | at-grade | |
| | | | | | | | | 15 | | | | Altonaer Platz | | at-grade | |
| | | | 5 | | | | | | | | | Am Butzweilerhof † | | at-grade | 2010 |
| | | 4 | | | | | | | | | | Am Emberg | | at-grade | |
| | | | | | | | 13 | | 16 | | | Amsterdamer Straße/Gürtel * | | elevated, at-grade | 1974 |
| | 3 | 4 | 5 | | | | | | 16 | | 18 | Appellhofplatz * | | underground | 1968 |
| | | | | | | | | | | | 18 | Arnulfstraße | | at-grade | |
| | | | | | 9 | | | | | | | Autobahn | | at-grade | |
| | | | | | | | | | 16 | | | Bad Godesberg Bf * (Bonn) | Bonn Stadtbahn | underground | |
| | | | | | | | | | 16 | | | Bad Godesberg Stadthalle † (Bonn) | Bonn Stadtbahn | underground | |
| 1 | | | | | | | | | | | | Bahnstraße | | at-grade | |
| | | | | | | 12 | | 15 | 16 | | 18 | Barbarossaplatz * | | at-grade | |
| | | | | 7 | | | | | | | | Baumschulenweg | | at-grade | |
| | | | | | | | | | 16 | 17 | | Bayenthalgürtel * | | at-grade | |
| 1 | | | | | | | | | | | | Bensberg † (Bergisch-Gladbach) | | underground | 2000 |
| | | | | | | | 13 | | | | | Berrenrather Straße/Gürtel | | at-grade | |
| 1 | 3 | 4 | | | 9 | | | | | | | Bf Deutz/Messe * Bf Deutz/Lanxess Arena * | | underground, at-grade | |
| | | | | | | | 13 | | | | 18 | Bf Mülheim * | | underground | 1997 |
| | 3 | 4 | | | | | | | | | | Bocklemünd † | | at-grade | |
| | | | | | | | | | | | 18 | Boltensternstraße | | at-grade | 1974 |
| | | | | | | | | | | 17 | | Bonner Wall | | underground | |
| | | | | | | | | | 16 | | 18 | Bonn Hbf (Bonn) ** | Trams in Bonn Bonn Stadtbahn | underground | |
| | | | | | | | | | 16 | | 18 | Bonn West (Bonn) * | Bonn Stadtbahn | at-grade | |
| | | | | | | | | | | | 18 | Bornheim (Bornheim) | Bonn Stadtbahn | at-grade | |
| | | | | | | | | | | | 18 | Bornheim Rathaus (Bornheim) | Bonn Stadtbahn | at-grade | |
| | | | | 7 | | | | | | | | Brahmsstraße | | at-grade | |
| | | | | | | | | | 16 | | 18 | Breslauer Platz/Hauptbahnhof * | | underground | 1974 |
| 1 | | | | | | | | | | | | Brück Mauspfad | | at-grade | |
| | | | | | | | | | | | 18 | Brühler Straße (Bonn) | Bonn Stadtbahn | at-grade | |
| | | | | | | | | | | | 18 | Brühl-Vochem (Brühl) | | at-grade | |
| | | | | | | | | | | | 18 | Brühl Nord (Brühl) | | at-grade | |
| | | | | | | | | | | | 18 | Brühl Mitte (Brühl) | | at-grade | |
| | | | | | | | | | | | 18 | Brühl Süd (Brühl) | | at-grade | |
| | | | | | | | | | | | 18 | Brühl-Badorf (Brühl) | | at-grade | |
| | | | | | | | | | | | 18 | Brühl-Schwadorf (Brühl) | | at-grade | |
| | 3 | | | | | | | | | | | Buchforst Waldecker Straße | | at-grade | |
| | 3 | | | | | | | | | | | Buchheim Frankfurter Straße | | at-grade | |
| | 3 | | | | | | 13 | | | | 18 | Buchheim Herler Straße * | | at-grade | |
| | | | | | | | | | 16 | | | Bundesrechnungshof/Auswärtiges Amt * (Bonn) | Bonn Stadtbahn | underground | |
| | | | | | | | | | 16 | | | Buschdorf (Bonn) | | at-grade | |
| | | | | | | | | 15 | 16 | 17 | | Chlodwigplatz * | | underground, at-grade | 2015 |
| | | | | | | | | 15 | | | | Chorweiler † | | underground | 1973 |
| | | | | | | 12 | | 15 | | | | Christophstraße/ Mediapark * | | underground | 1987 |
| 1 | | | | | | | | | | | | Clarenbachstift | | at-grade | |
| | | | | | 9 | | | | | | | Dasselstraße/Bf Süd | | at-grade | |
| | 3 | | | | | | | | | | 18 | Dellbrück Hauptstraße * | | at-grade | |
| | 3 | | | | | | | | | | 18 | Dellbrück Mauspfad * | | at-grade | |
| | | | | | | | | | | | 18 | Dersdorf (Bornheim) | | at-grade | |
| 1 | | | | 7 | 9 | | | | | | | Deutzer Freiheit * | | at-grade | |
| 1 | | | | | 9 | | | | | | | Deutz Technische Hochschule * | | underground | |
| | | | 5 | | | | | | 16 | | 18 | Dom/Hauptbahnhof * | | underground | 1974 |
| | | | | | | | | | | | 18 | Dransdorf (Bonn) | Bonn Stadtbahn | at-grade | |
| | | | | 7 | | | | | | | | Drehbrücke | | at-grade | |
| | | | | 7 | | | 13 | | | | | Dürener Straße/Gürtel * | | at-grade | |
| | | | | | | 12 | | 15 | 16 | | 18 | Ebertplatz * | | underground | 1974 |
| | | | | | | | | | | | 18 | Efferen (Hürth) | | at-grade | |
| | | | | | | 12 | | | | | | Eifelplatz | | at-grade | |
| | | | | | | 12 | | 15 | 16 | | | Eifelstraße * | | at-grade | |
| | | | | | | | | | | | 18 | Eifelwall/Stadtarchiv | | at-grade | |
| | | | | 7 | | | | | | | | Ensen Gilgaustraße | | at-grade | |
| | | | | 7 | | | | | | | | Ensen Kloster | | at-grade | |
| | | | | | | | 13 | | | | | Escher Straße | | elevated | |
| 1 | | | | | | | | | | | | Eupener Straße | | at-grade | |
| | | | | | | | 13 | | | | | Euskirchener Straße | | at-grade | |
| | | | | | | | | | | | 18 | Fischenich (Hürth) | | at-grade | |
| 1 | | | | | | | | | | | | Flehbachstraße | | at-grade | |
| | | | | | | 12 | | 15 | | | | Florastraße * | | underground | 1974 |
| | | | | | | 12 | | | | | | Fordwerke Nord | | at-grade | |
| | | | | | | 12 | | | | | | Fordwerke Mitte | | at-grade | |
| | | | | | | 12 | | | | | | Fordwerke Süd | | at-grade | |
| 1 | | | | | | | | | | | | Frankenforst (Bergisch Gladbach) | | at-grade | |
| | | | | 7 | | | | | | | | Frechen-Benzelrath † (Frechen) | | at-grade | |
| | | | | 7 | | | | | | | | Frechen Bf (Frechen) | | at-grade | |
| | | | | 7 | | | | | | | | Frechen Kirche (Frechen) | | at-grade | |
| | | | | 7 | | | | | | | | Frechen Rathaus (Frechen) | | at-grade | |
| | 3 | 4 | 5 | | | 12 | | 15 | | | | Friesenplatz * | | underground | 1987 |
| 1 | | | | | | | | | | | | Fuldaer Straße | | underground | |
| | | | | | | 12 | | | | | | Geestemünder Straße | | at-grade | |
| | | | | | | | 13 | | | | | Geldernstraße/ Parkgürtel * | | underground | |
| | | | | | | | 13 | | | | | Gleueler Straße/Gürtel | | at-grade | |
| | | | | | | | | | 16 | | | Godorf | | at-grade | |
| | 3 | | | | | | | | | | | Görlinger-Zentrum † | | at-grade | 2018 |
| | | | | | | 12 | | | | | | Gottesweg | | at-grade | |
| | | 4 | | | | | | | | | | Grünstraße | | at-grade | |
| | | | 5 | | | | | | | | | Gutenbergstraße | | at-grade | |
| | 3 | 4 | 5 | | | | | | | | | Hans-Böckler Platz/Bf West * | | underground | 1987 |
| | | | | | | 12 | | 15 | | | | Hansaring * | | underground | 1974 |
| | | | | 7 | | | | | | | | Haus Vorst | | at-grade | |
| | | | | | | | | 15 | | | | Heimersdorf | | underground | 1971 |
| | | | | | | | | | 16 | 17 | | Heinrich-Lübke-Ufer * | | at-grade | |
| | | | | | | | | 15 | | | | Herforder Straße | | at-grade | |
| | | | | | | | | | 16 | | | Hersel (Bornheim) | | at-grade | |
| | | | | | | 12 | | | | | | Herthastraße | | at-grade | |
| 1 | | | 5 | 7 | 9 | | | | | | | Heumarkt ** | | underground, at-grade | |
| | | | | | | | | | 16 | | | Heussallee (Bonn) | Bonn Stadtbahn | underground | |
| | | | | | | | | | 16 | | | Hochkreuz (Bonn) | Bonn Stadtbahn | at-grade | |
| 1 | | | | | | | | | | | | Höhenberg Frankfurter Straße | | at-grade | |
| | 3 | | | | | | 13 | | | | 18 | Holweide Vischeringstraße ** | | at-grade | |
| | | | | | | | | | | | 18 | Hürth-Hermülheim (Hürth) | | at-grade | |
| | | | 5 | | | | | | | | | IKEA Am Butzweilerhof | | at-grade | |
| | | | 5 | | | | | | | | | Iltisstraße | | at-grade | |
| 1 | | | | | | | | | | | | Im Hoppenkamp (Bergisch-Gladbach) | | at-grade | |
| | | 4 | | | | | | | | | | Im Weidenbruch | | at-grade | |
| 1 | | | | | | | | | | | | Junkersdorf | | at-grade | |
| | | | | | | | | | 16 | | | Juridicum (Bonn) | Bonn Stadtbahn | underground | |
| 1 | | | | | | | | | | | | Kalker Friedhof | | at-grade | |
| 1 | | | | | 9 | | | | | | | Kalk Kapelle * | | underground | |
| 1 | | | | | 9 | | | | | | | Kalk Post * | | underground | |
| | | | | | | | | | | 17 | | Kartäuserhof | | underground | |
| | | 4 | | | | | | | | | | Keupstraße | | at-grade | |
| | | | | | | | | | | | 18 | Kiebitzweg (Hürth) | | at-grade | |
| | | | | | | | | | 16 | | | Kinderkrankenhaus | | at-grade | |
| 1 | | | | | | | | | | | | Kippekausen (Bergisch-Gladbach) | | at-grade | |
| | | | | | | | | | | | 18 | Klettenbergpark | | at-grade | |
| | 3 | 4 | | | | | | | | | | Koelnmesse * | | at-grade | |
| 1 | | | | | | | | | | | | Kölner Straße (Bergisch-Gladbach) | | at-grade | |
| | | | | | 9 | | | | | | | Königsforst † | | at-grade | 1904 |
| | 3 | 4 | | | | | | | | | | Körnerstraße * | | underground | 1989 |
| | | | 5 | | | | | | | | | Lenauplatz | | at-grade | |
| | | 4 | | | | | | | | | | Leuchterstraße | | at-grade | |
| | 3 | 4 | | | | | | | | | | Leyendeckerstraße * | | underground | 1992 |
| | | | 5 | | | | | | | | | Liebigstraße | | at-grade | |
| | | | | | 9 | | | | | | | Lindenburg | | at-grade | |
| | | | | | | 12 | | 15 | | | | Lohsestraße * | | underground | 1987 |
| | | | | | | | | 15 | | | | Longericher Straße | | at-grade | |
| | | | | | | | | 15 | | | | Longerich Friedhof | | at-grade | |
| 1 | | | | | | | | | | | | Lustheide (Bergisch-Gladbach) | | at-grade | |
| 1 | | | | | | | | | | | | Maarweg | | at-grade | |
| | | | 5 | | | | | | | | | Margaretastraße | | at-grade | |
| | 3 | | | | | | | | | | 18 | Maria-Himmelfahrt-Straße * | | at-grade | |
| | | | | 7 | | | | | | | | Marsdorf | | at-grade | |
| | | | | | 9 | | | | | | | Mauritiuskirche | | at-grade | |
| | | | | | | | | | 16 | | | Max-Löbner-Straße (Bonn) | Bonn Stadtbahn | at-grade | |
| | | | | | | | | 15 | | | | Meerfeldstraße | | at-grade | |
| 1 | | | | 7 | | | | | | | | Melaten * | | at-grade | |
| | | | | | | | 13 | | | | | Melatengürtel * | | at-grade | |
| 1 | | | | | | | | | | | | Merheim | | at-grade | |
| | | | | | | 12 | | | | | | Merkenich † | | at-grade | |
| | | | | | | 12 | | | | | | Merkenich Mitte | | at-grade | |
| | | | | | | | | | | | 18 | Merten (Bornheim) | | at-grade | |
| | | | | | | | | | 16 | 17 | | Michaelshoven * | | at-grade | |
| 1 | | | | | | | | | | | | Mohnweg | | at-grade | |
| | | | | | | 12 | | 15 | | | | Mollwitzstraße * | | at-grade | |
| 1 | | | | 7 | | | | | | | | Moltkestraße * | | at-grade | |
| | | | | | 9 | | | | | | | Mommsenstraße | | at-grade | |
| | | | | 7 | | | | | | | | Mühlengasse (Frechen) | | at-grade | |
| | | 4 | | | | | | | | | | Mühlheim Berliner Straße | | at-grade | |
| | | | | | | | | | 16 | | | Museum Koenig (Bonn) | Bonn Stadtbahn | underground | |
| | | | | | | | | | 16 | | | Nesselrodestraße | | at-grade | |
| 1 | | | | | | | | | | | | Neuenweg | | at-grade | |
| | 3 | | | | | | | | | | 18 | Neufelder Straße * | | at-grade | |
| 1 | 3 | 4 | | 7 | 9 | | | | 16 | | 18 | Neumarkt * | | underground, at-grade | |
| | | | | | | 12 | 13 | 15 | | | | Neusser Straße/Gürtel* | | underground, elevated | 1974 |
| | | | | | | 12 | | | | | | Niehl Nord | | at-grade | |
| | | | | | | | | | 16 | | | Niehl Sebastianstraße † | | at-grade | 1992 |
| | | | 5 | | | | 13 | | | | | Nußbaumerstraße * | | at-grade | |
| | | 4 | | | | | | | | | | Odenthaler Straße | | at-grade | |
| | 3 | | | | | | | | | | | Ollenhauerring | | at-grade | |
| | | | | | | | | | 16 | | | Ollenhauerstraße (Bonn) | Bonn Stadtbahn | at-grade | |
| | | | | | | | | | 16 | | | Olof-Palme-Allee (Bonn) | Bonn Stadtbahn | at-grade | |
| | | | | | 9 | | | | | | | Ostheim | | at-grade | |
| | 3 | 4 | | | | | | | | | | Piusstraße * | | underground | 1989 |
| | | | | | | | | | 16 | | | Plittersdorfer Straße (Bonn) | Bonn Stadtbahn | underground | |
| | | | | | | 12 | | | | | | Pohligstraße | | at-grade | |
| | | | | 7 | | | | | | | | Poller Kirchweg | | at-grade | |
| | | | | 7 | | | | | | | | Poll Salmstraße | | at-grade | |
| | | | | 7 | | | | | | | | Porz Markt | | at-grade | |
| | | | | 7 | | | | | | | | Porz Steinstraße | | at-grade | |
| | | | | | 9 | | | | | | | Porzer Straße | | at-grade | |
| | 3 | 4 | | | | | | | 16 | | 18 | Poststraße * | | underground | |
| | | | | | | | | | 16 | | | Propsthof Nord (Bonn) | Bonn Stadtbahn | at-grade | |
| | | | | 7 | | | | | | | | Raffeisenstraße | | at-grade | |
| | | | 5 | | | | | | | | | Rathaus | | underground | |
| | | | | | 9 | | | | | | | Rath/Heumar | | at-grade | |
| 1 | | | | | | | | | | | | Refrath (Bergisch-Gladbach) | | at-grade | |
| | | | | | | | | | 16 | | 18 | Reichenspergerplatz * | | underground | |
| | | | 5 | | | | | | | | | Rektor-Klein-Straße | | at-grade | |
| 1 | | | | | | | | | | | | RheinEnergie Stadion | | at-grade | |
| | | | | | 9 | | | | | | | Röttgensweg | | at-grade | |
| | | | | | | | | | | | 18 | Robert-Kirchhoff-Straße (Bonn) | | at-grade | |
| | 3 | 4 | | | | | | | | | | Rochusplatz * | | underground | 1992 |
| | | | | | | | | | 16 | 17 | | Rodenkirchen Bf * | | at-grade | |
| | | | | | | | | | | | 18 | Roisdorf West (Bornheim) | Bonn Stadtbahn | at-grade | |
| | | | | 7 | | | | | | | | Rosenhügel | | at-grade | |
| 1 | | | | 7 | | 12 | | 15 | | | | Rudolfplatz * | | underground, at-grade | 1987 |
| | 3 | | | | | | | | | | | Schaffrathsgasse | | at-grade | |
| | | | | | | 12 | | 15 | | | | Scheibenstraße * | | at-grade | |
| | | 4 | | | | | | | | | | Schlebusch † | | at-grade | |
| | | | | | | | | | 16 | 17 | | Schönhauser Straße * | | at-grade | |
| | | | | 7 | | | | | | | | Severinsbrücke | | at-grade | |
| | 3 | 4 | | | | | | | | 17 | | Severinstraße ** | | underground, at-grade | 2015 |
| | | | | | | | | | 16 | 17 | | Siegstraße * | | at-grade | |
| | | | | | | | 13 | | | | 18 | Slabystraße * | | elevated, at-grade | 1974 |
| | 3 | 4 | | | | | | | | | | Stegerwaldsiedlung * | | at-grade | |
| | | | | | 9 | | | | | | | Steinweg | | at-grade | |
| | | | | 7 | | | | | | | | Stüttgenhof | | at-grade | |
| | | | 5 | | | | 13 | | | | | Subbelrather Straße/Gürtel * | | at-grade | |
| | 3 | 4 | | | | | | | | | | Suevenstraße * | | at-grade | |
| | | | | | | | | | | | 18 | Sülzburgstraße | | at-grade | |
| | | | | | | | 13 | | | | 18 | Sülzgürtel ** | | at-grade | |
| | | | | | 9 | | | | | | | Sülz Hermeskeiler Platz † | | at-grade | |
| | | | | | | | | | 16 | 17 | | Sürth Bf ** | | at-grade | |
| | | | | | | | | | 16 | | | Tannenbusch Mitte (Bonn) | Bonn Stadtbahn | at-grade | |
| | | | | | | | | | 16 | | | Tannenbusch Süd (Bonn) | Bonn Stadtbahn | at-grade | |
| | 3 | | | | | | | | | | 18 | Thielenbruch † | | at-grade | |
| | | | | | | | | 15 | 16 | | | Ubierring ** | | at-grade | |
| | | | | | | | | | 16 | | | Uedorf (Bornheim) | | at-grade | |
| | | | | | | | | 15 | 16 | | | Ulrepforte * | | at-grade | |
| | | | | | 9 | | | | | | | Universität | | at-grade | |
| 1 | | | | 7 | | | | | | | | Universitätsstraße * | | at-grade | |
| | | | | | | | | | 16 | | | Universität/Markt (Bonn) | Bonn Stadtbahn | underground | |
| | | | | | | | | | 16 | | | Urfeld (Wesseling) | | at-grade | |
| | 3 | 4 | | | | | 13 | | | | | Venloer Straße/Gürtel * | | underground | 1989 |
| | | | | | 9 | | | | | | | Vingst | | underground | |
| | | 4 | | | | | | | | | | Von-Sparr-Straße | | at-grade | |
| | | | | | | | | | | | 18 | Walberberg (Bornheim) | | at-grade | |
| | | | | | | | | | | | 18 | Waldorf (Bornheim) | | at-grade | |
| 1 | | | | | | | | | | | | Weiden Römergrab | | at-grade | |
| 1 | | | | | | | | | | | | Weiden West ** | | at-grade | |
| 1 | | | | | | | | | | | | Weiden Zentrum | | at-grade | |
| | | | | | | | 13 | | | | | Weinsbergstraße/Gürtel | | at-grade | |
| | | | | | | | | | | | 18 | Weißhausstraße | | at-grade | |
| | | | | | | | | | 16 | | | Wesseling Nord (Wesseling) | | at-grade | |
| | | | | | | | | | 16 | | | Wesseling (Wesseling) | | at-grade | |
| | | | | | | | | | 16 | | | Wesseling Süd (Wesseling) | | at-grade | |
| | 3 | 4 | | | | | | | | | | Westfriedhof * | | at-grade | |
| | | | | 7 | | | | | | | | Westhoven Berliner Straße | | at-grade | |
| | | | | 7 | | | | | | | | Westhoven Kölner Straße | | at-grade | |
| | | | | | 9 | | | | | | | Weyertal | | at-grade | |
| | 3 | | | | | | 13 | | | | 18 | Wichheimer Straße * | | at-grade | |
| | | | | | | | | | 16 | | | Widdig (Bornheim) | | at-grade | |
| | | 4 | | | | | 13 | | | | 18 | Wiener Platz * | | underground, at-grade | 1997 |
| | | | | | | 12 | | 15 | | | | Wilhelm-Sollmann-Straße * | | at-grade | |
| | 3 | 4 | | | | | | | | | | Wolffsohnstraße * | | at-grade | |
| | | | | 7 | | | 13 | | | | | Wüllnerstraße station * | | at-grade | |
| | | | | | | | | | 16 | | | Wurzerstraße (Bonn) | Bonn Stadtbahn | underground | |
| | | | | | | 12 | | | | | | Zollstockgürtel | | at-grade | |
| | | | | | | 12 | | | | | | Zollstock Südfriedhof † | | at-grade | |
| | | | | | | | | | | | 18 | Zoo/Flora | Cologne Cable Car | at-grade | |
| | | | | | 9 | 12 | | 15 | | | | Zülpicher Platz * | | at-grade | |
| | | | | | 9 | | 13 | | | | | Zülpicher Straße/Gürtel * | | at-grade | |
| | | | | 7 | | | | | | | | Zündorf † | | at-grade | |

sources: Rapid Transit Map, Cologne 2022 (in English and German), Information about the stop (in English)

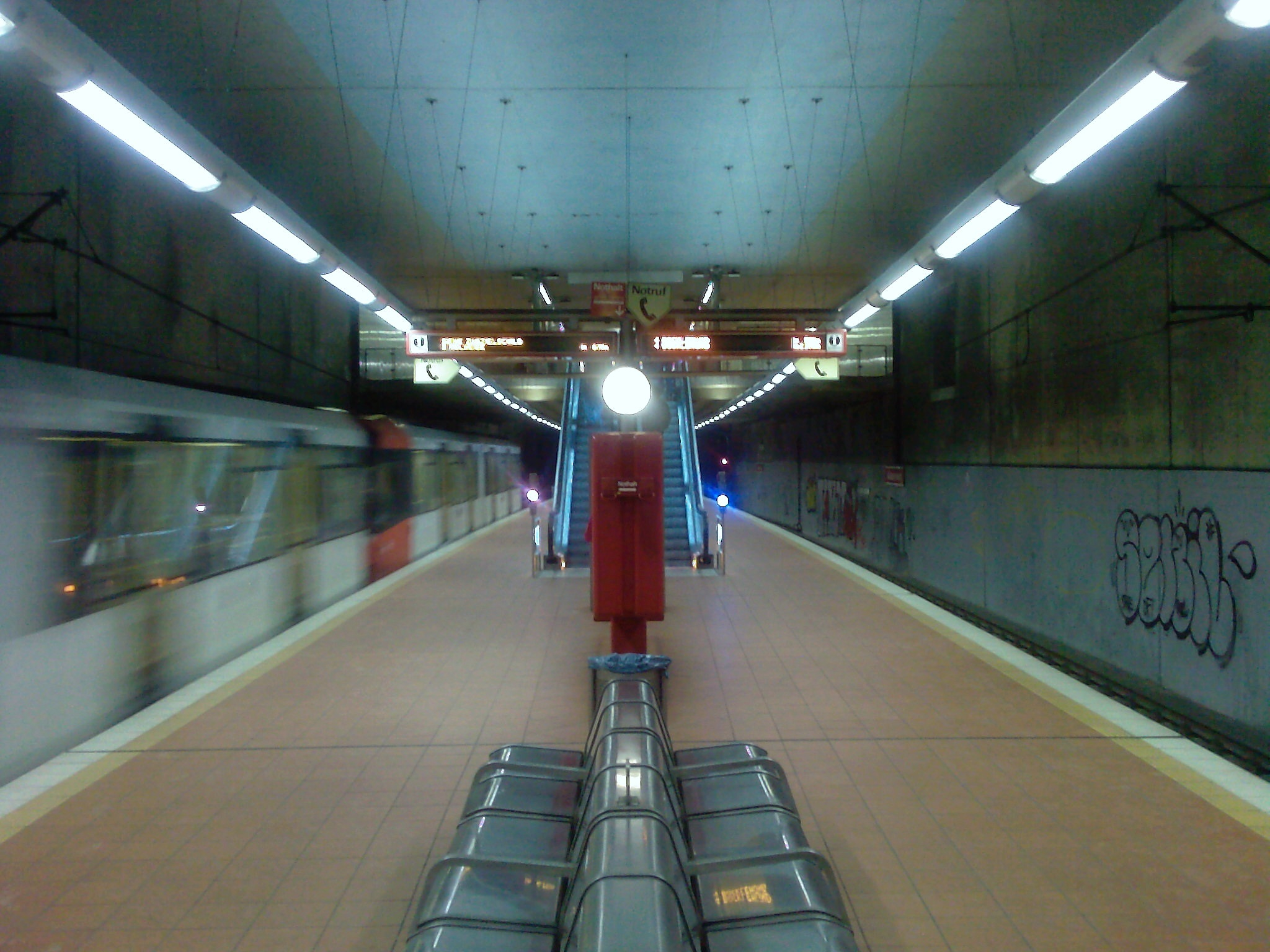
Akazienweg

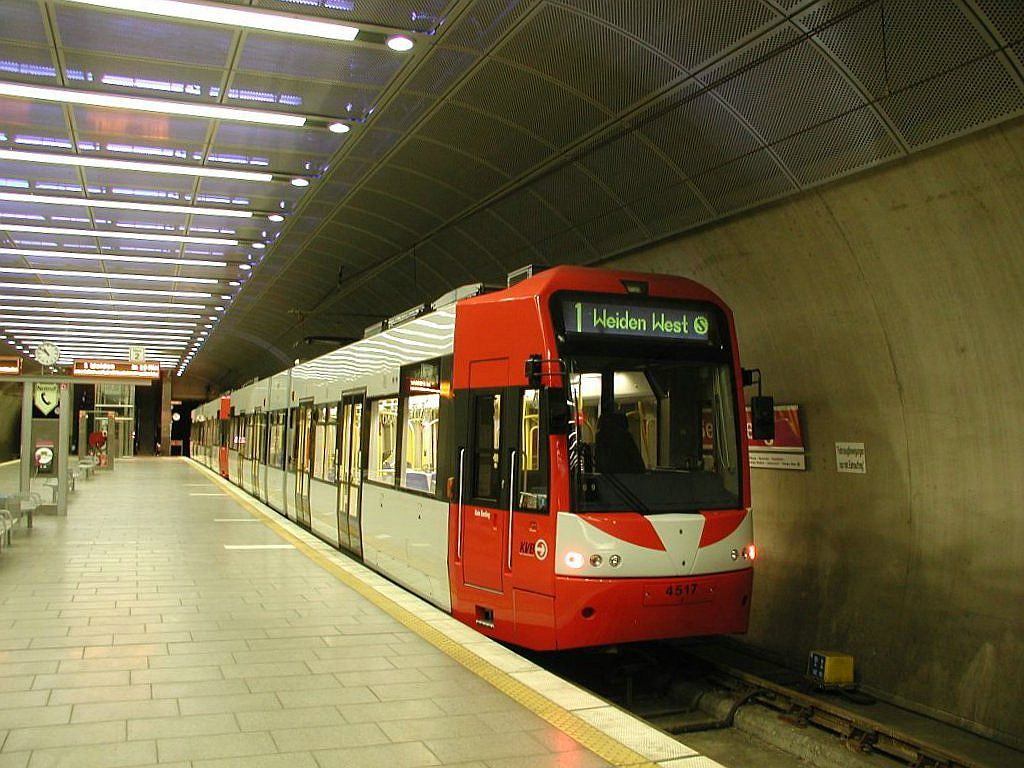
Bensberg

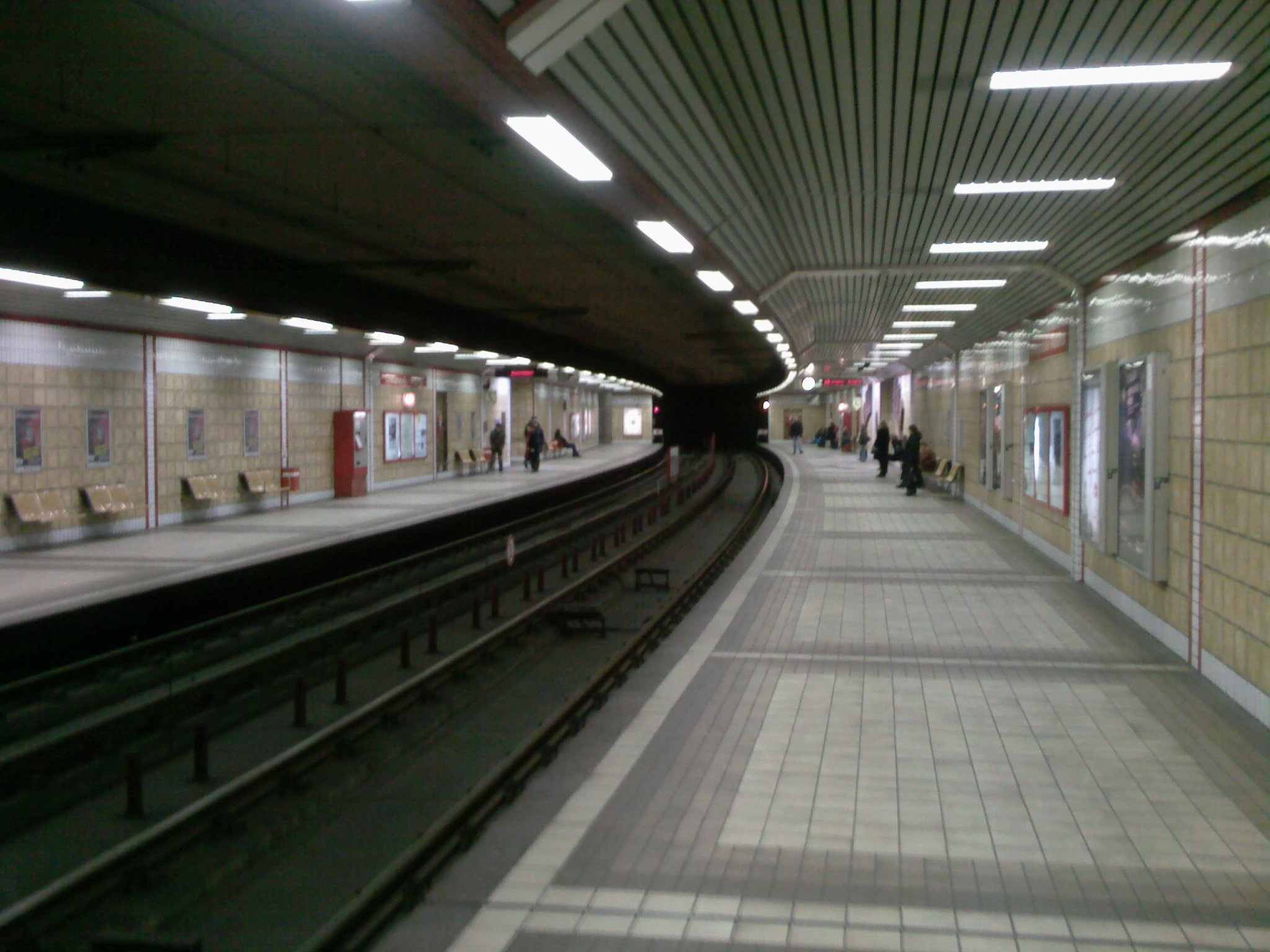
Christophstraße/Mediapark

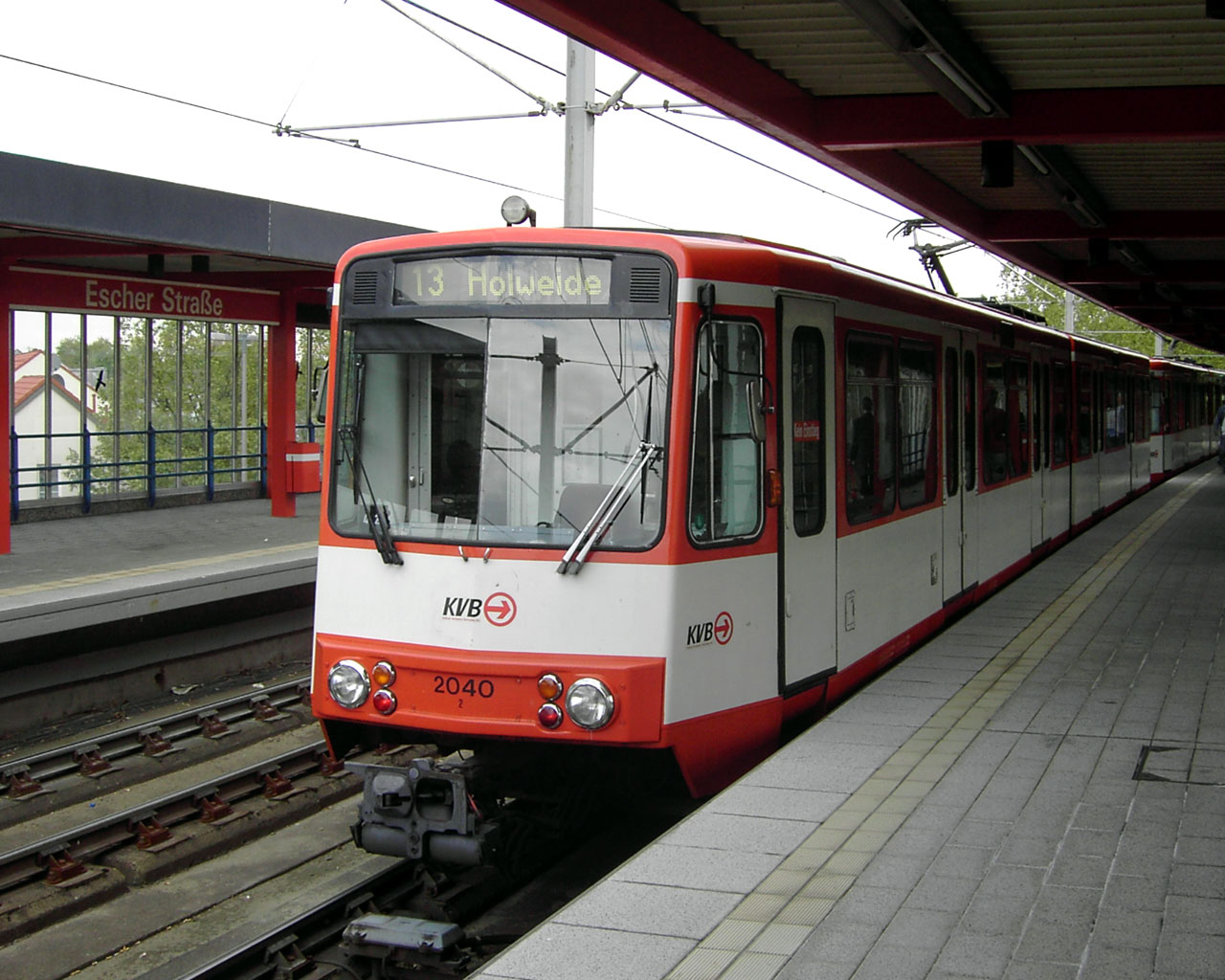
Escher Straße

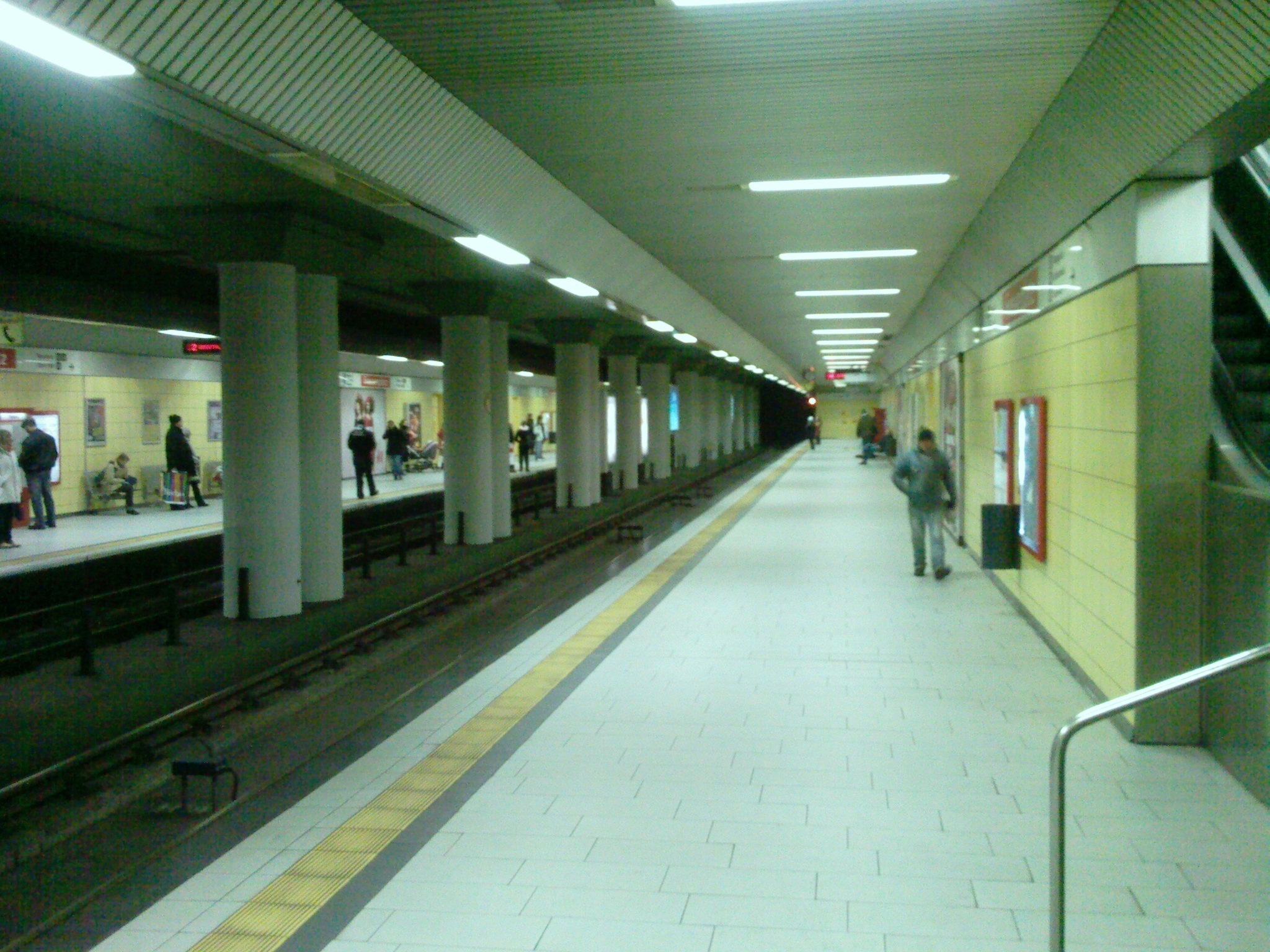
Friesenplatz

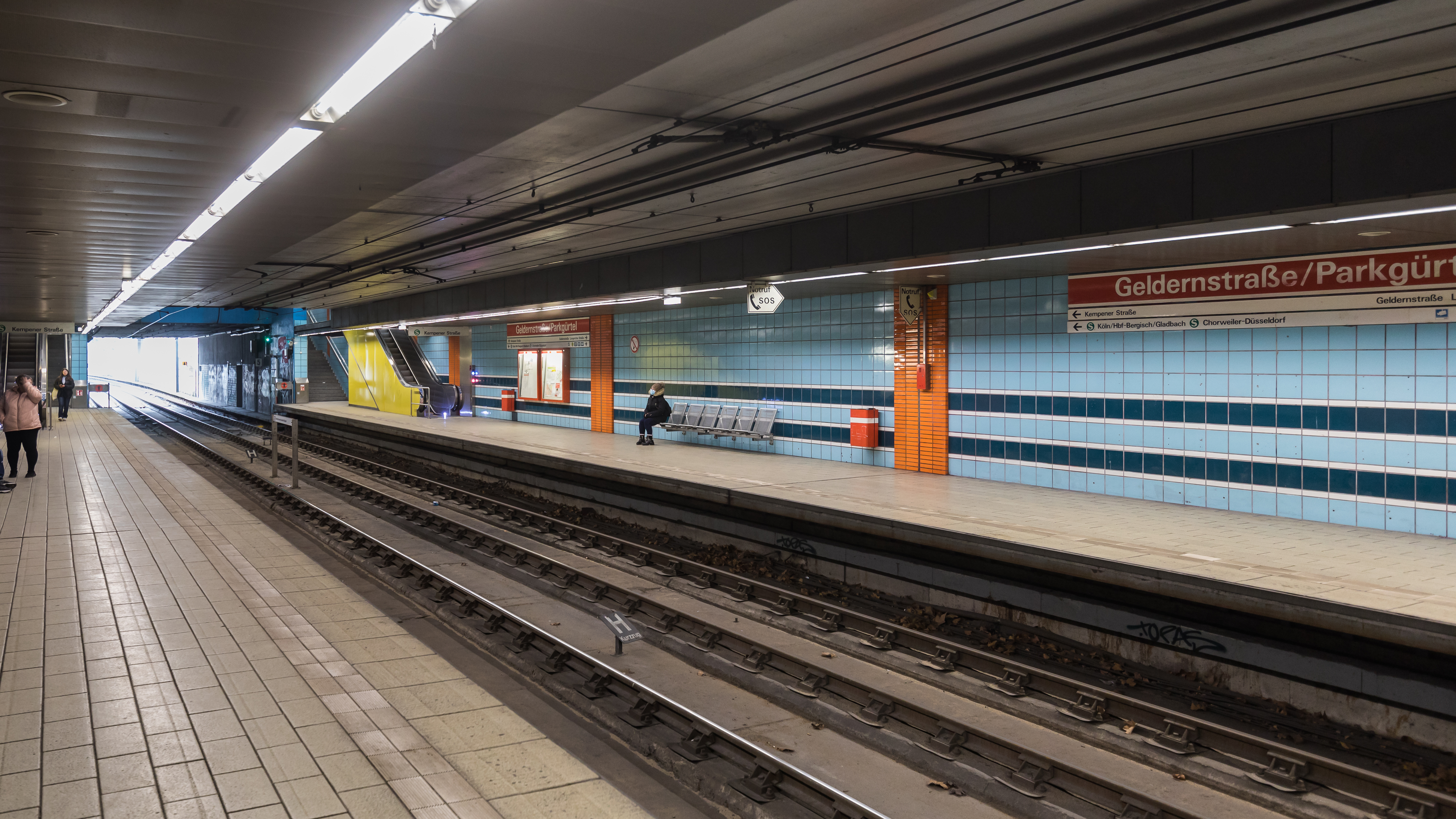
Geldernstraße/Parkgürtel

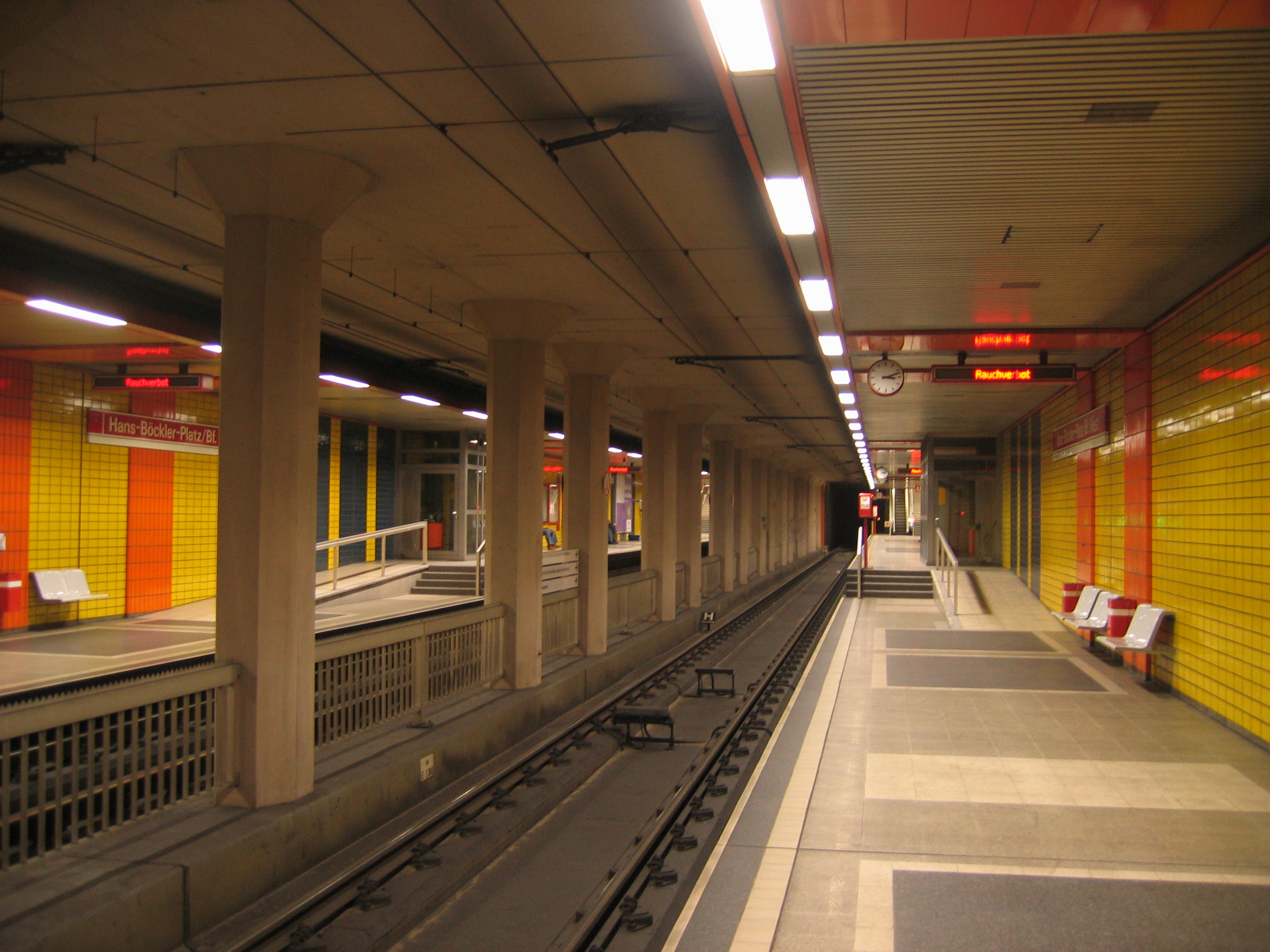
Hans-Böckler Platz

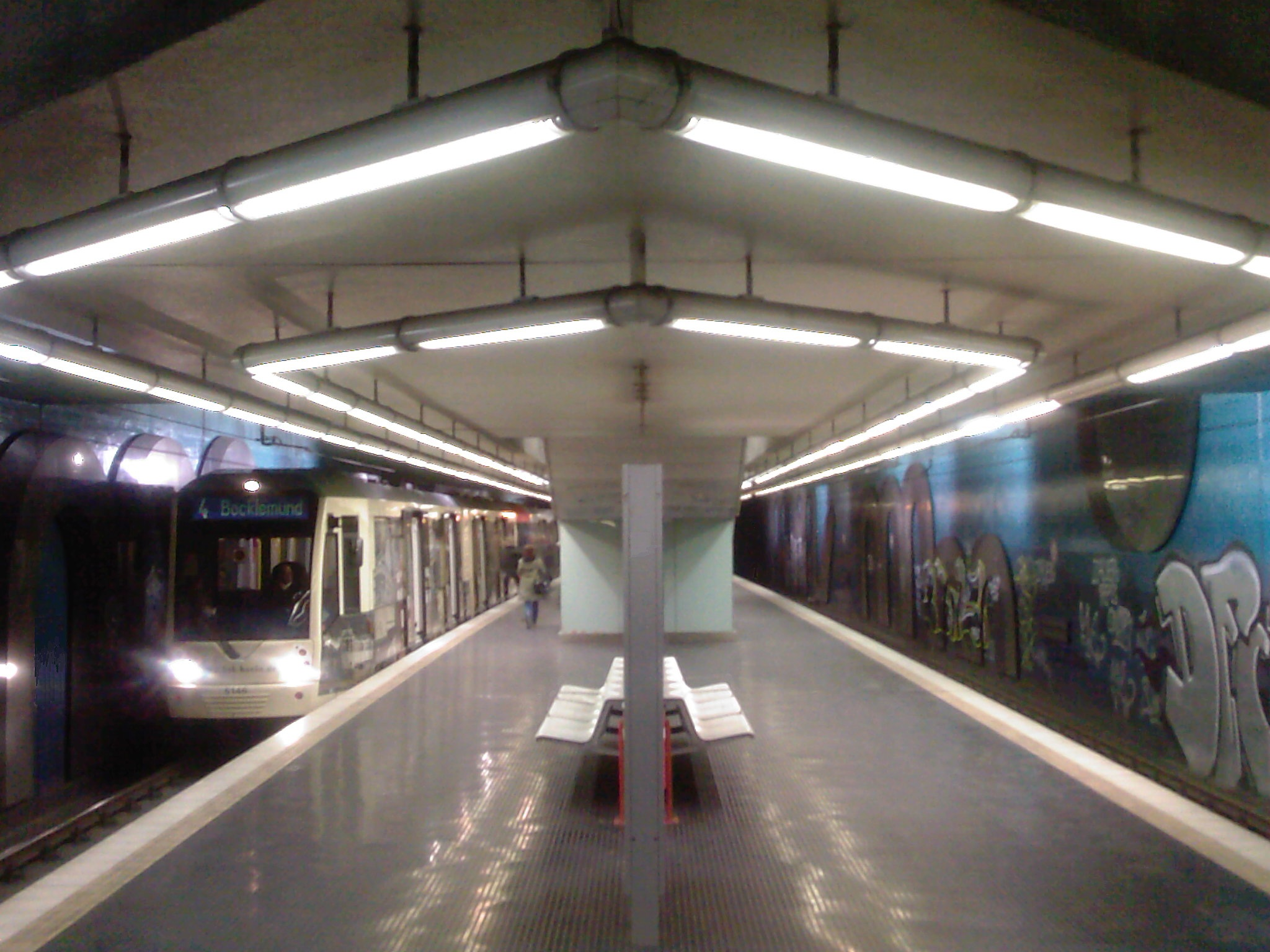
Körnerstraße

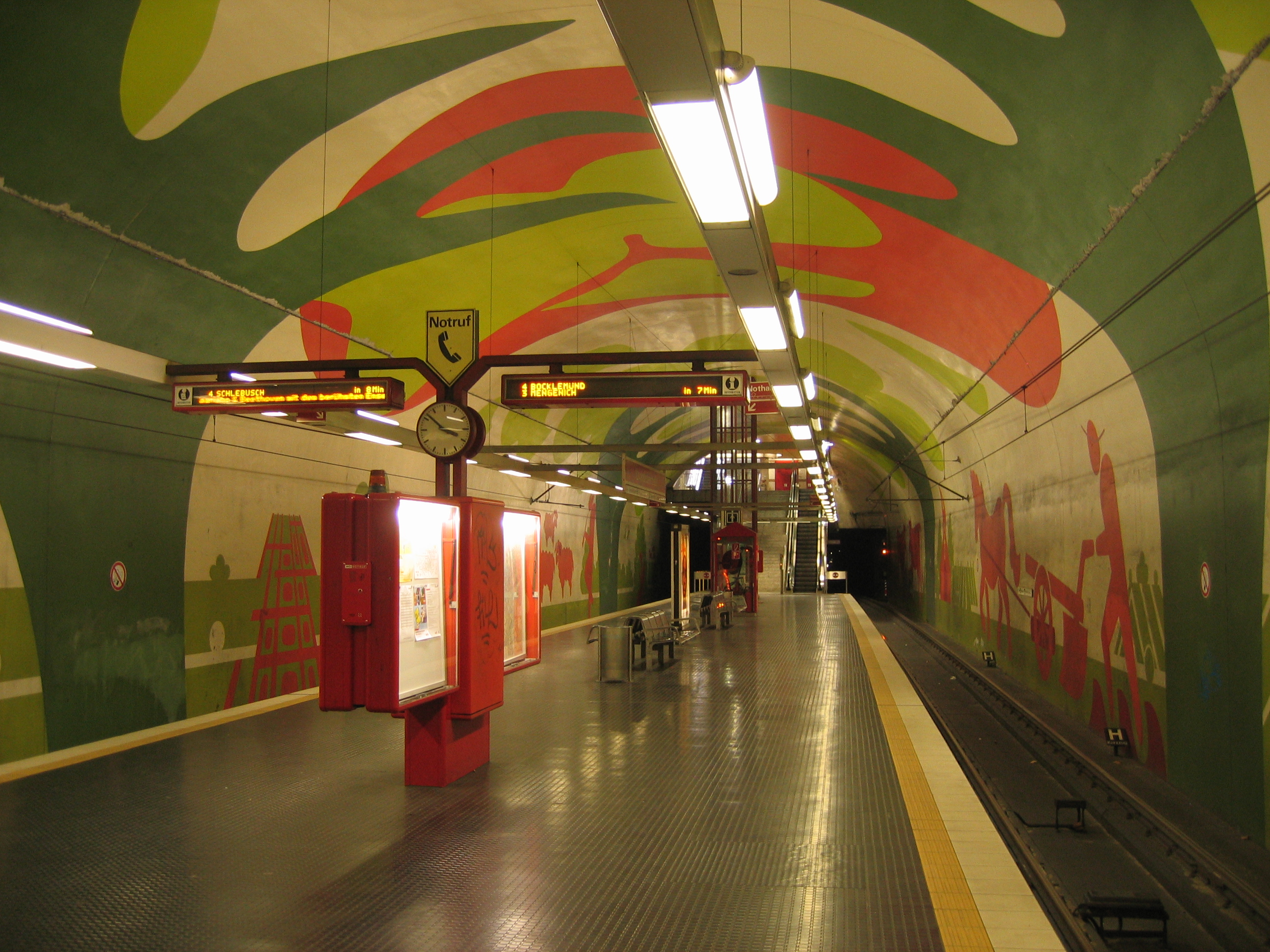
Leyendeckerstraße

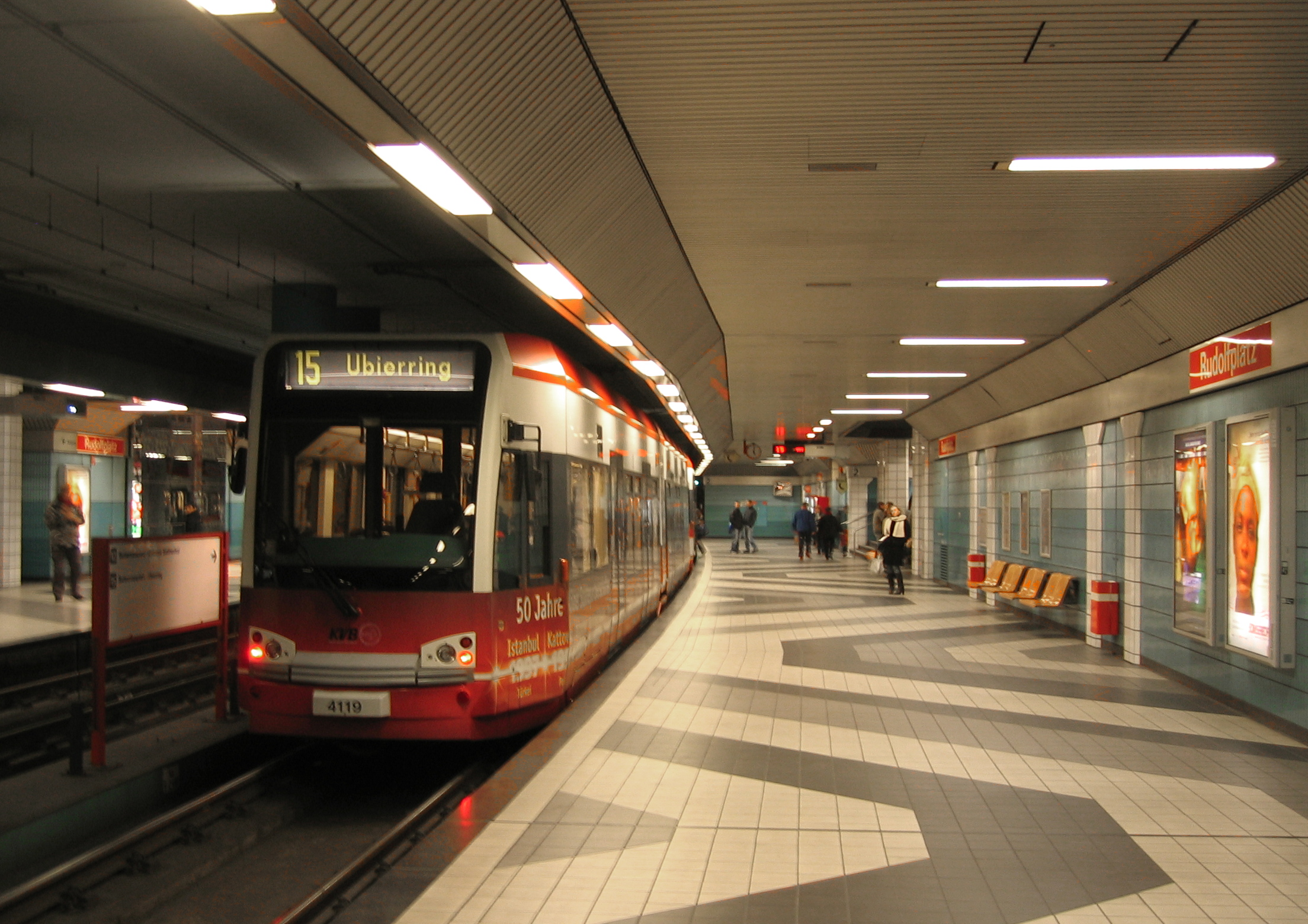
Rudolfplatz

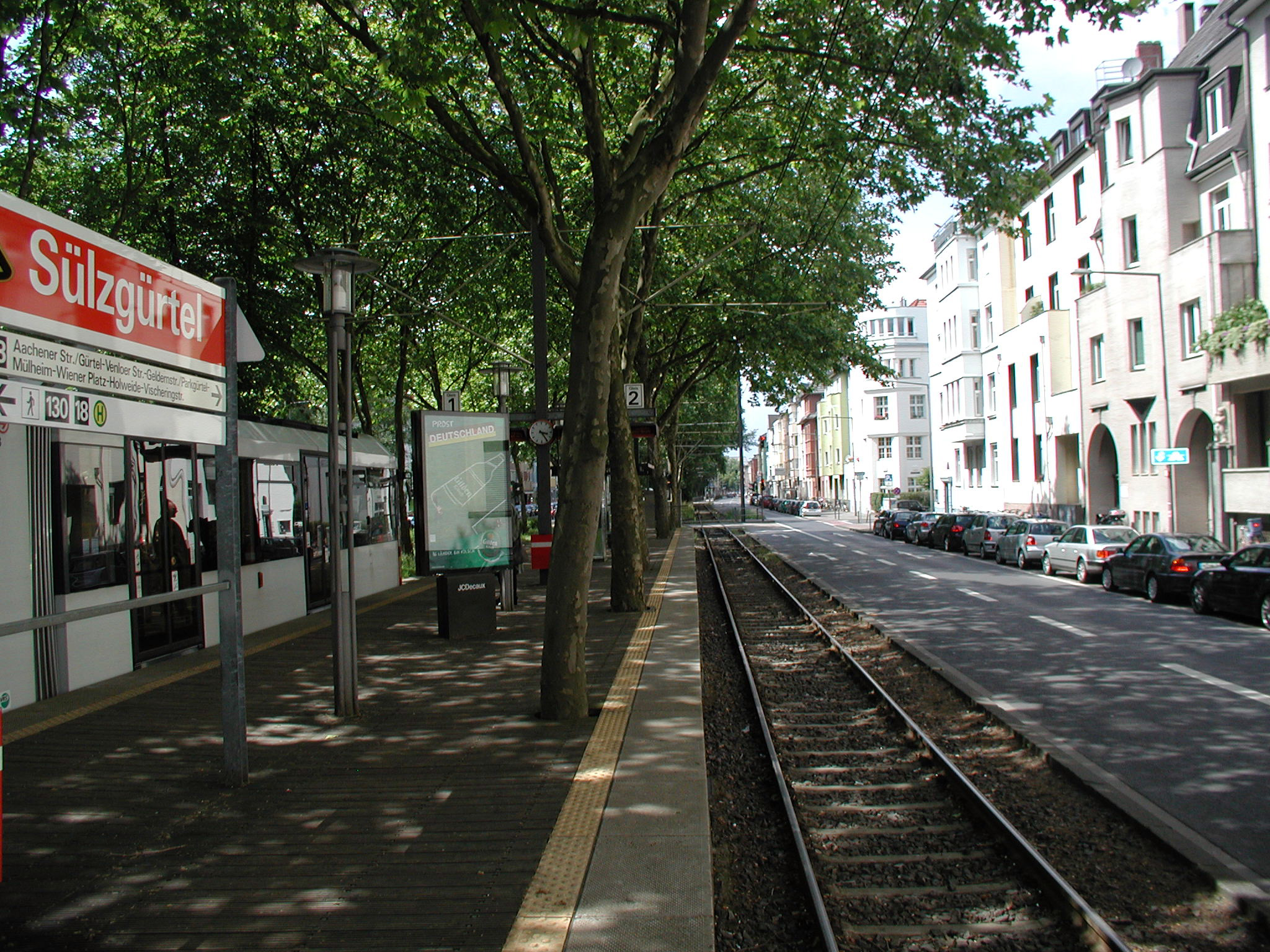
Sülzgürtel

== See also ==
- Transport in Cologne
