= RheinEnergie =

RheinEnergie can refer to:

- RheinEnergie AG, energy company based in Cologne
- RheinEnergieStadion, sports stadium in Cologne
- Köln 99ers, formerly RheinEnergie Köln, defunct basketball club
