= Bocklemünd/Mengenich =

- Stadtteil of Cologne
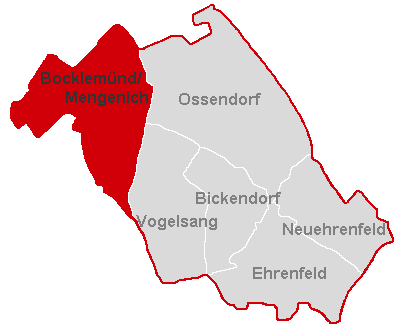
- Location within Ehrenfeld
- Interactive map of Bocklemünd/Mengenich
- Location within Germany Location within North Rhine-Westphalia
- Coordinates: 50°58′32″N 6°51′32″E
- Country: Germany
- State: North Rhine-Westphalia
- Admin. region: Cologne
- District: Urban district
- City: Cologne
- Borough: Ehrenfeld

Area
  - Total: 4.93 km^{2} (1.90 sq mi)

Population (2020-12-31)
  - Total: 10,705
  - Density: 2,170/km^{2} (5,620/sq mi)
- Time zone: UTC+01:00 (CET)
  - Summer (DST): UTC+02:00 (CEST)
- Website: stadt-koeln.de

Bocklemünd/Mengenich (German pronunciation: [ˈbɔkləmʏnt ˈmɛŋənɪç]) is a district on the north-western outskirts of Cologne in the urban district of Ehrenfeld. It consists of the villages Bocklemünd and Mengenich, which grew together and administratively merged in 1950. Today the district is known for the large production facilities of the WDR.

== Location ==
The district borders in the east on Pesch, Ossendorf and Vogelsang, in the south on Widdersdorf, in the west on Pulheim and in the north on Esch/Auweiler. The district is crossed by the arterial road Venloer Straße in north-western direction.
