= Escher Straße station =

Tramway station in Nippes, Cologne, Germany

Coordinates: 50°57′52″N 6°56′1″E

Escher Straße is one of a few elevated stations on the Cologne Stadtbahn network. It is served by line 13, also known as Gürtellinie (Belt Line). The halt is located on the Cologne Belt at Parkgürtel in the Cologne district of Nippes (Bilderstöckchen).

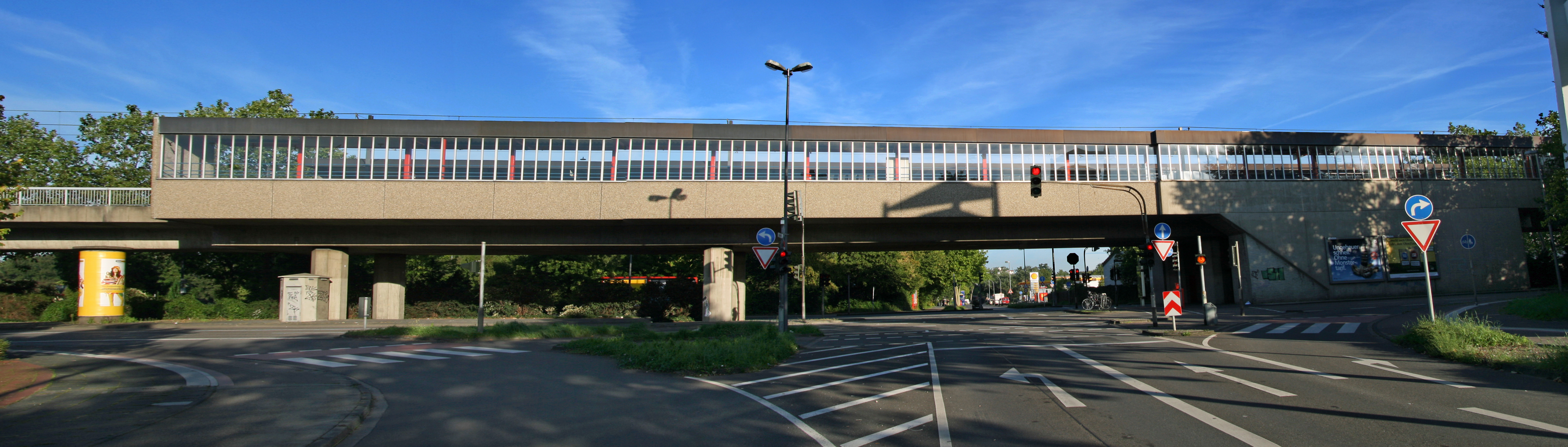
Escher Straße station

== See also ==
- List of Cologne KVB stations

Preceding station	Cologne Stadtbahn	Following station
Nußbaumerstraße towards Sülzgürtel	Line 13	Köln Geldernstraße/Parkgürtel towards Holweide Vischeringstraße
