= Görlinger-Zentrum station =

Railway station in Cologne, Germany

Görlinger-Zentrum
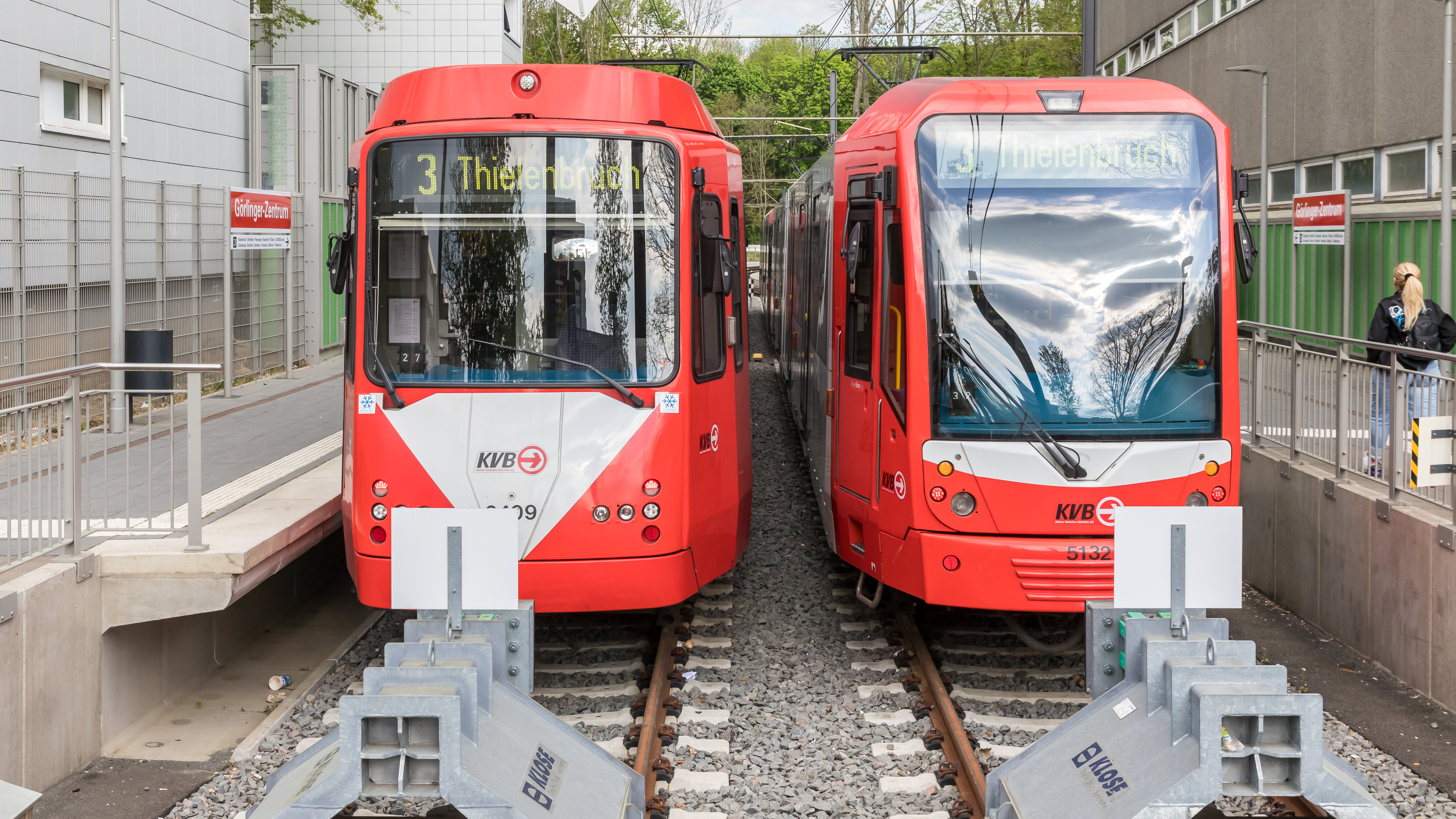

General information
- Location: Görlinger-Zentrum; 50829 Cologne; North Rhine-Westphalia; Germany
- Coordinates: 50°58′50″N 6°52′14″E
- Owner: Stadtwerke Köln
- Operator: KVB
- Platforms: 2 side platforms
- Tracks: 2

Construction
- Parking: No
- Cycle facilities: Yes
- Accessible: Yes

Other information
- Fare zone: VRS: 2100
- Website: www.kvb.koeln

History
- Opened: 27 August 2018; 7 years ago

Services
| Preceding station | Cologne Stadtbahn | Following station |
|---|---|---|
| Terminus | Line 3 | Ollenhauerring towards Thielenbruch |
Location
- Location within North Rhine-Westphalia Location within Germany Location within Europe

Görlinger-Zentrum is the northwesternmost terminal station of Cologne Stadtbahn line 3, located in Cologne, Germany. The station lies in the Görlinger-Zentrum of the district of Bocklemünd.

The station was opened on 27 August 2018 and consists of two side platforms with together two rail tracks.

By lowering the tracks in the area of the terminal stop, a level access at sidewalk level was made possible. The new terminus was equipped with a 90-centimetre high platform for barrier-free access.

Location of the stop

== See also ==
- List of Cologne KVB stations
