= Thielenbruch station =

Railway station in Cologne, Germany

Thielenbruch
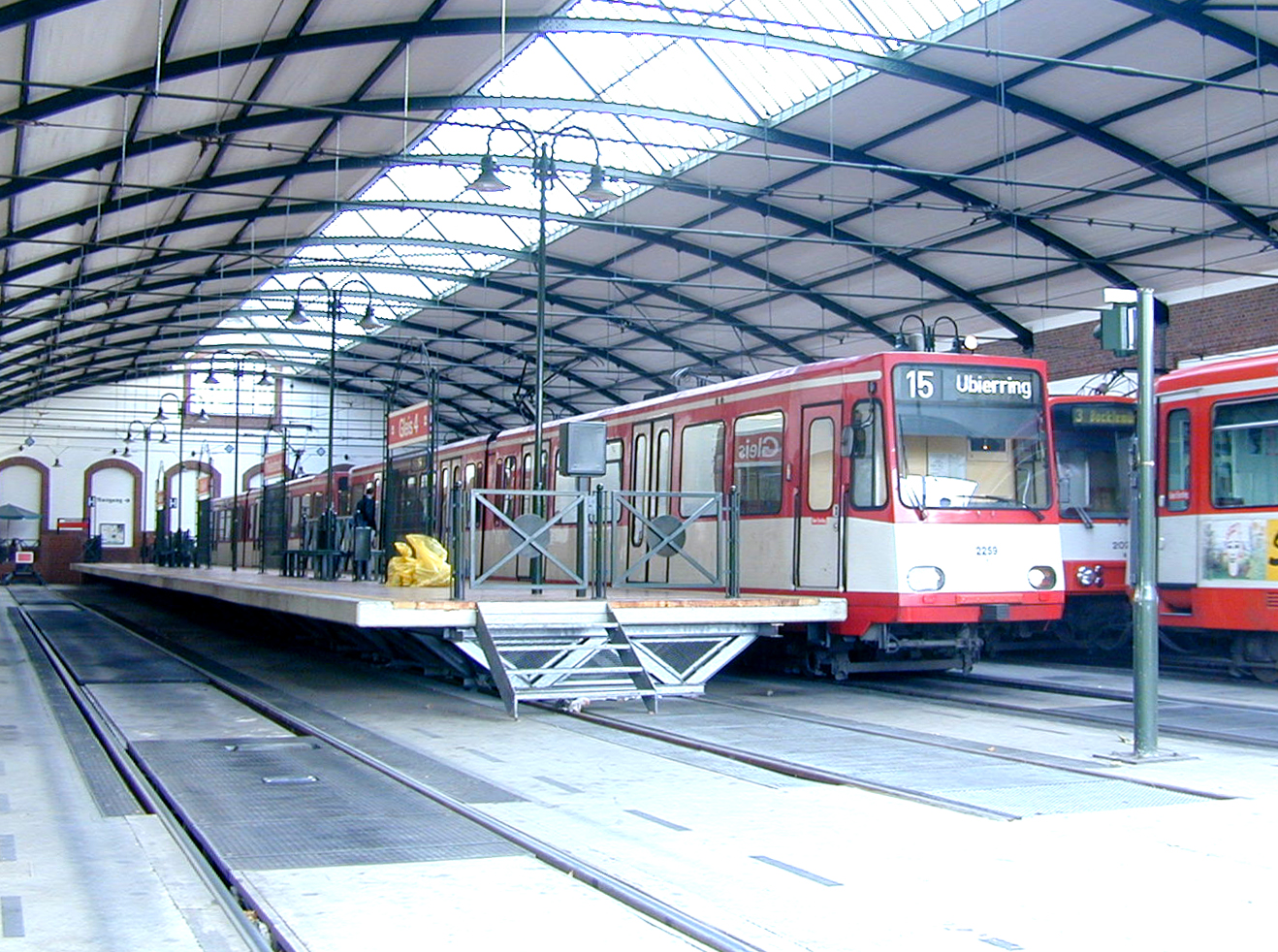
- Stadtbahn line 18 in Thielenbruch

General information
- Location: Gemarkenstraße 149, 51069 Köln
- Coordinates: 50°58′40″N 7°05′07″E
- Owner: Kölner Verkehrs-Betriebe
- Platforms: 2 bay platforms
- Connections: Bus, Taxi

Construction
- Structure type: At grade
- Accessible: Yes

Other information
- Fare zone: VRS: 2100

History
- Opened: 1. June 1995

Services
Preceding station	Cologne Stadtbahn	Following station
Dellbrück Hauptstraße towards Görlinger-Zentrum	Line 3	Terminus
Dellbrück Hauptstraße towards Bonn Hbf	Line 18	Terminus
Route map
Location

Thielenbruch station is a terminal and former depot of Cologne Stadtbahn located in the quarter of Dellbrück in Cologne. It is the northern terminus of Stadtbahn lines 3 and 18.

== Terminal ==
The former depot Thielenbruch for the tram network consisted of one hall from 1906 and another from 1926. The older hall was rebuilt to the terminal of the Stadtbahn lines. There are today two platforms of which each serve two tracks, so the station totally offers four tracks.

== Museum ==
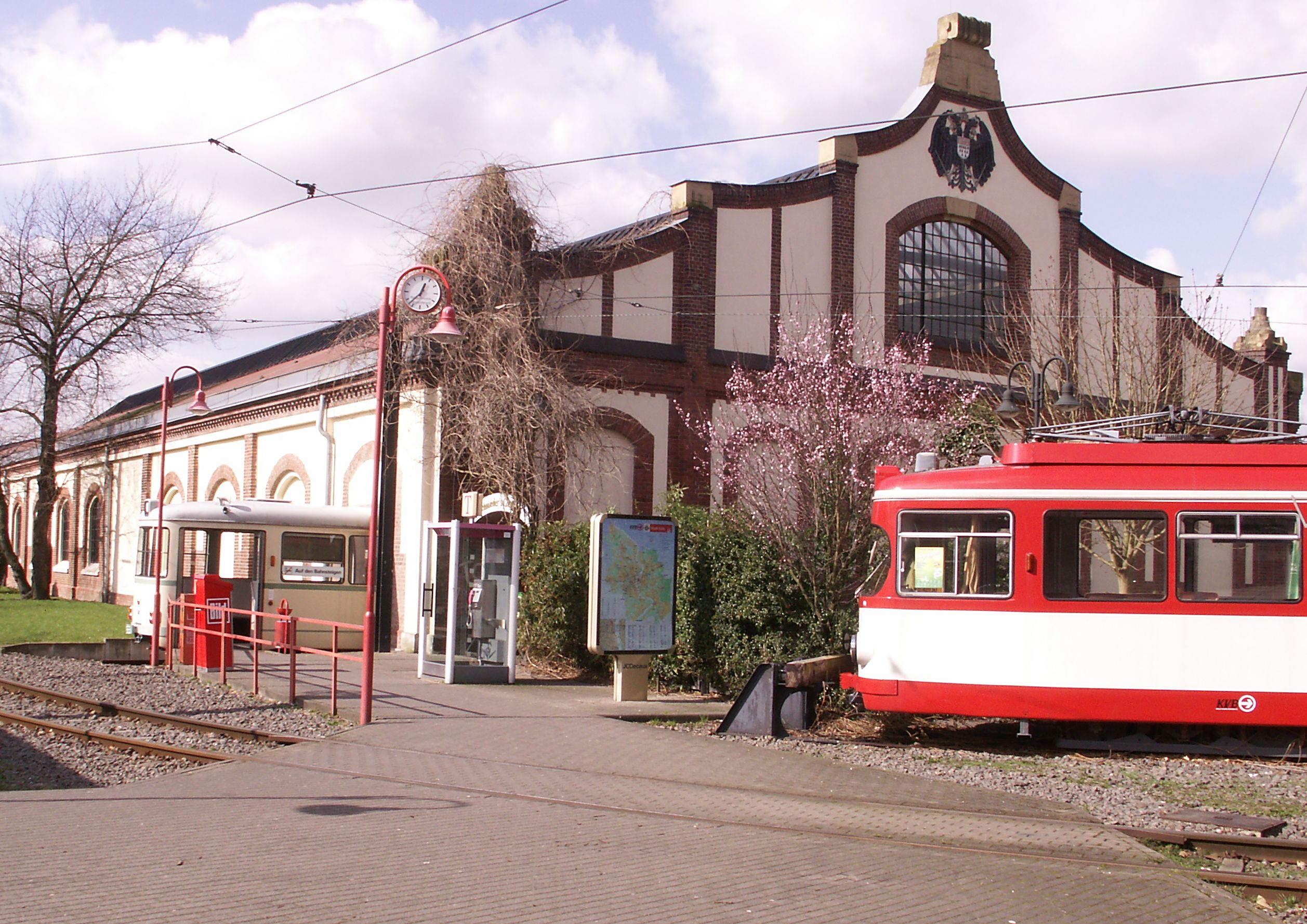
Outside view of the museum

Since 1997, the hall from 1926 is used as a transport museum to document the development of tramways and Stadtbahn in the Cologne region. Its collection contains several tram cars that were used by the Cologne transport authority (Kölner Verkehrsbetriebe, KVB), among them a horse-drawn tram, an "Achtachser" (lit. eight-axler), an articulated tram with eight axles, which was the last classical tram of Cologne, yet a very common type as it was used almost throughout the entire network, as well as the prototype of the Stadtbahn car B.

== See also ==
- List of Cologne KVB stations
