= Stadtwerke Köln =

Infrastructure and services company

- Industry: Infrastructure, utilities
- Headquarters: Cologne, Germany
- Revenue: €5.5 billion
- Net income: €127 million
- Total assets: tangible €2.6 billion (2009)
- Total equity: €1.1 billion (2009)
- Owner: City of Cologne
- Number of employees: ~10,000
- Website: www.stadtwerkekoeln.de

Stadtwerke Köln GmbH is the infrastructure and services company of the City of Cologne.

The company undertakes water supply and electrical, gas, heat and steam energy supply through the subsidiary RheinEnergie. Other subsidiaries provide waste management and housing services for the city, in addition to operating the public baths. The subsidiaries Kölner Verkehrs-Betriebe (KVB) and Häfen und Güterverkehr Köln (HGK) operate the city's urban and industrial transportation systems respectively.

== History ==
The company was established in 1960 by Cologne City Council as the public utility company of the city.

On 29 August 2010 the company celebrated its 50th anniversary.

== Company structure and subsidiaries ==
Stadtwerke Köln is 100% owned by the city of Cologne; it acts as a holding company for six main group companies: GEW Köln AG (energy and water supply through the subsidiary RheinEnergie AG), KVB (Kölner Verkehrs-Betriebe AG); urban transportation, AWB (AWB Abfallwirtschaftsbetriebe Köln GmbH & Co. KG); refuse collection, HGK (Häfen und Güterverkehr Köln AG); port operation and industrial railway, WSK (Wohnungsgesellschaft der Stadtwerke Köln mbH); housing, and KölnBäder GmbH; operator of the municipal swimming pools.

=== RheinEnergie AG ===
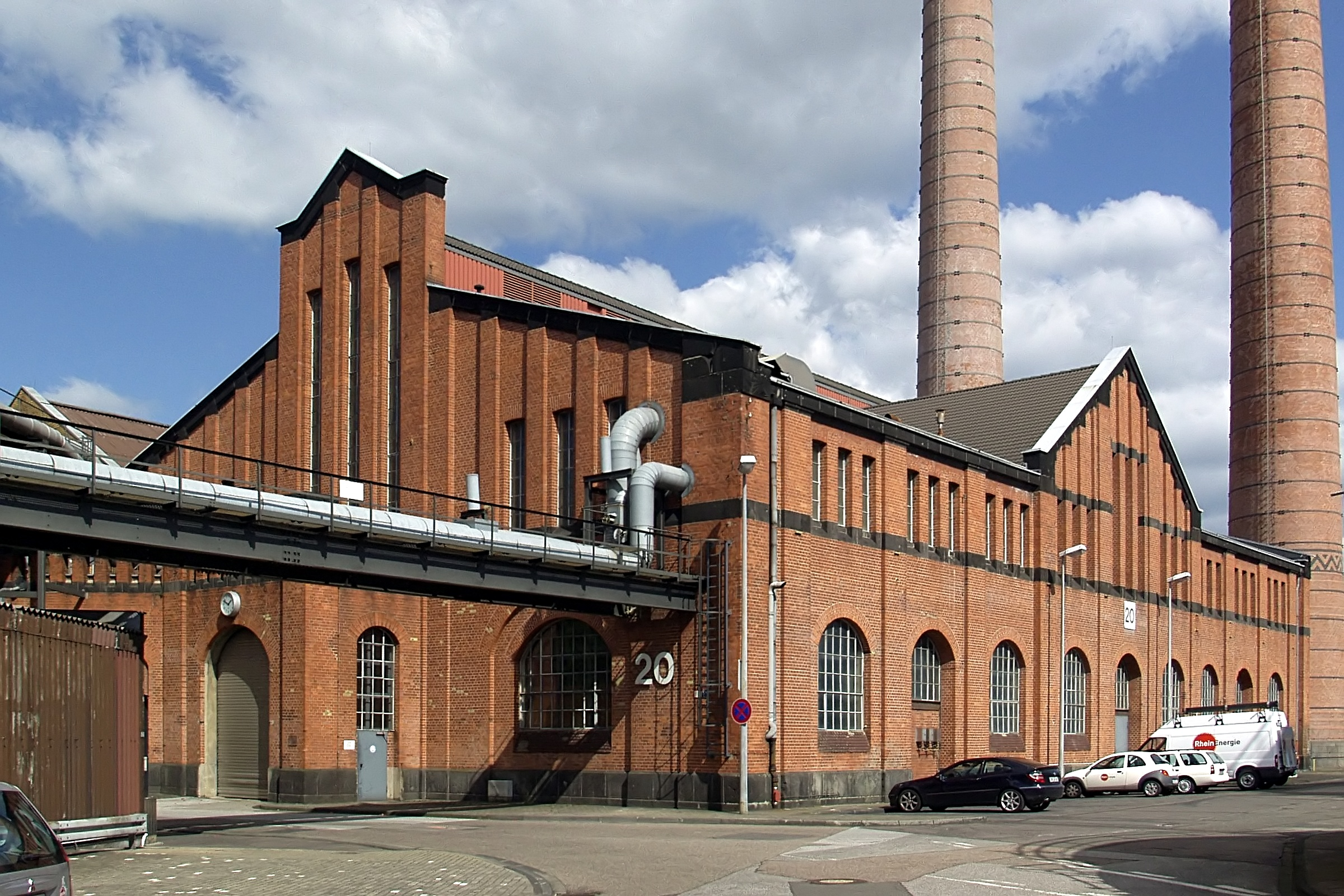
Energy co-generation plant (constructed 1901)

The origins of the company GEW Köln AG (Gas-, Elektrizitäts- und Wasserwerke Köln AG) date to the 19th century. In 2002 the assets of the business were transferred to GEW RheinEnergie AG and GEW Köln became the holding company, also incorporated into the firm was RGW (Rechtsrheinische Gas- und Wasserversorgung AG). In 2004/5 the operating company was renamed RheinEnergie AG.

The company's three main business areas are electricity, water and natural gas supply. In 2009 the company supplied 14,259 gigawatt-hours (51.33 PJ) of electricity, 7,773 GWh (27.98 PJ) of gas, and had a supply capacity of 660 GWh (2.4 PJ) of energy in the form of steam and 1,256 GWh (4.52 PJ) of heat energy. The company operates four combined heat and power plants which use waste heat energy to provide heating to suburbs of Cologne, and supplies some factories with steam.

The company supplied 77.4 million litres of drinking water in 2009.

=== Kölner Verkehrs-Betriebe AG ===
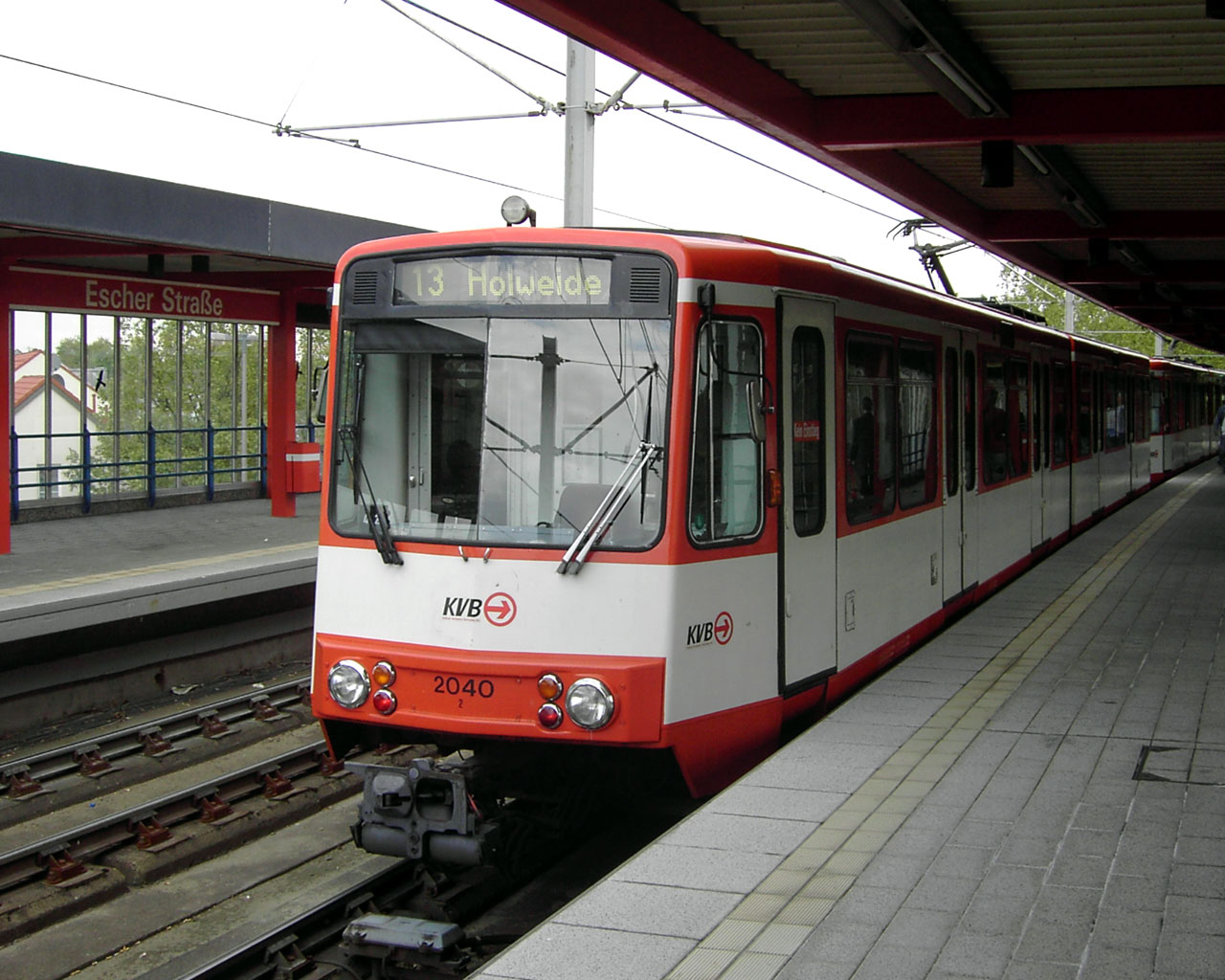
KVB train at the elevated Escher Straße station in Cologne

City rail transport in Cologne dates back as far as 1877 when the first horse-drawn railway was operated, by the 1900s electric trams had been introduced. During the first half of the twentieth century the network expanded in all directions, further expansion occurred in the second half of the century; in particular underground railways; by 1974 over 40 km of underground track and 13 km of overhead track had been built. In 1960 the company became an aktiengesellschaft (limited company) owned by the City of Cologne and Stadtwerke Köln.

In 1992 the Köln-Bonner Eisenbahn (KBE) and Köln-Frechen-Benzelrather Eisenbahn (KFBE) merged into the Häfen und Güterverkehr Köln (HGK) to form a new freight company; the KVB took over the passenger tram lines 16 and 18 of the KBE. A tram museum Straßenbahn-Museum Thielenbruch was opened in 1997 in the former 1926 wagon shed at Thielenbruch.

The Kölner Verkehrs-Betriebe AG (KVB) operates the city's urban light railway system and buses, as well maintenance of vehicles and infrastructure work related to the mass transit system.

The light rail system consists of lines radiating from the city centre as well as ring lines; as of 2022 both high and low floor trains are operated, depending on route.

The company operates over 350 trains and ~300 buses, with more than 800,000 people transported each day.

=== Häfen und Güterverkehr Köln AG ===
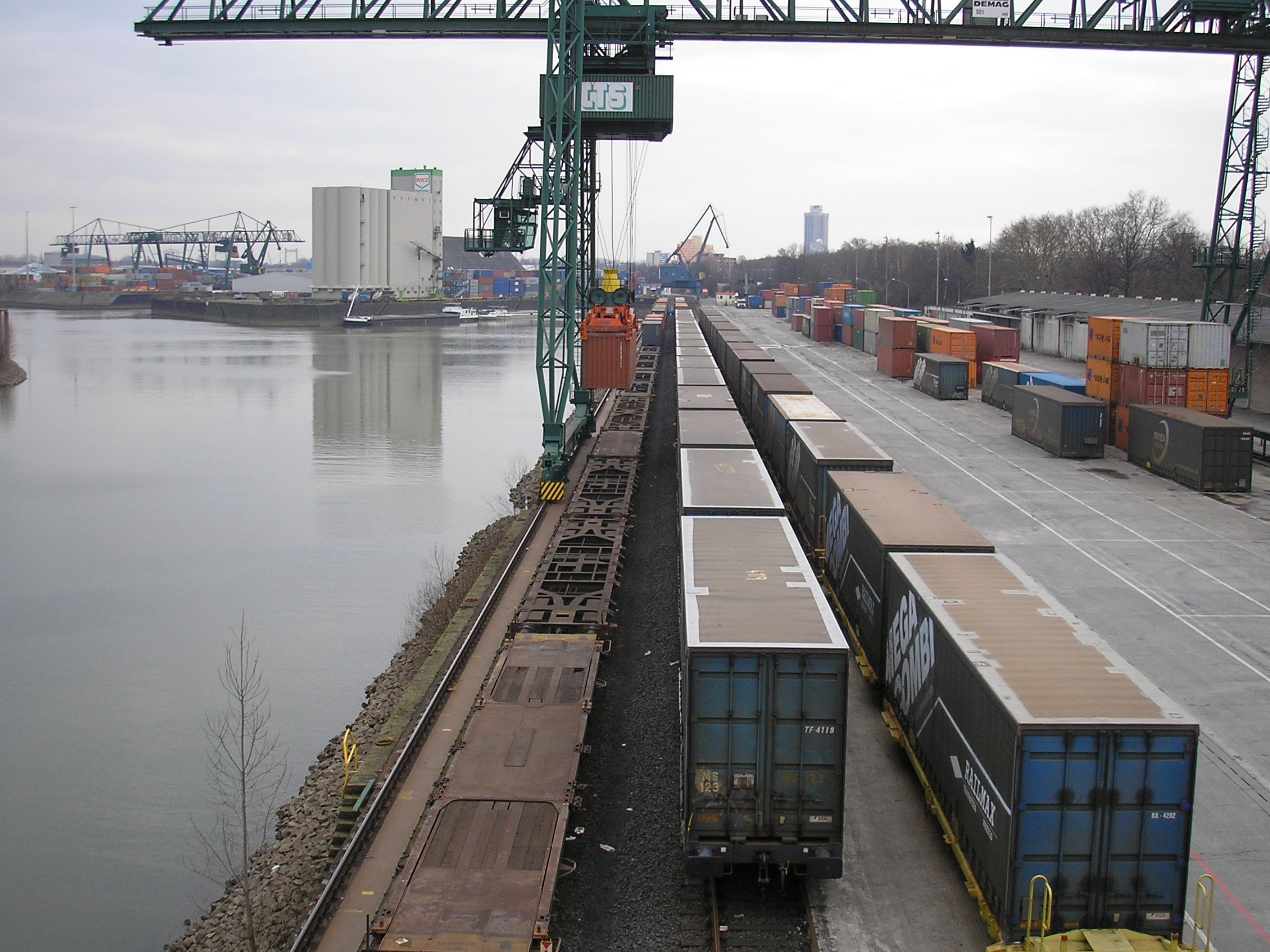
Container facilities at Niehl I

The Häfen und Güterverkehr Köln was founded in 1992 by the merger of the Häfen Köln GmbH. with the Köln-Bonner Eisenbahn and Köln-Frechen-Benzelrather Eisenbahn.

The company operates four ports in Cologne; Niehl I, Niehl II, Godorf, and Deutz, as well as rail linked container terminals in Hürth, Bergisch Gladbach and Düren and further afield; ~500,000 TEU of containerised traffic and nearly 12 million tonnes of cargo were handled in 2009, making the port of Cologne the second largest in Germany after Duisburg. In total the ports have 14.5 km of quay length and an area of 1,250,600 m^{2} (1.2506 km^{2}).

Niehl I is the primary container port with ~450,000 TEU of container traffic in 2009 and equipped with 36m reach gantry cranes allowing side stacked vessels up to 4 deep to be unloaded, other cargos handled include general dry bulk, fuel oils and paper. Niehl II handles cars, liquid goods including dangerous liquids and hydrocarbon gases. Deutz handles low value non-hazardous goods including sand, gravel, animal feed, grain, lumber and liquid chalk. Godorf handles bulk aggregates at Godorf I including salt, gravel, limestone; at Godorf II chemical and hydrocarbon products are handled.

The company's rail system has over 250 km of track with over 100 km of sidings, over 90 km of which is used for commuter trains. For rail freight the company operates its own trains. Along with over 500 wagons the main traction is by MaK DE 1002, Vossloh G 1000 BB, Vossloh G 1700 BB and GM-EMD JT42CWR diesel locomotives, as well a leased electric locomotives of TRAXX type. The company runs long distance trains as well as port operations.

=== Other subsidiaries ===
Abfallwirtschaftsbetriebe Köln GmbH & Co. KG is the city's waste collection and street cleaning company.

KölnBäder GmbH is the subsidiary responsible for operating and running the city's swimming pools.

Wohnungsgesellschaft der Stadtwerke Köln mbH is the subsidiary which provides housing for city employees.
