= Cologne Stadtbahn =

Light rail system in Cologne, North Rhine-Westphalia, Germany

- KVB logo

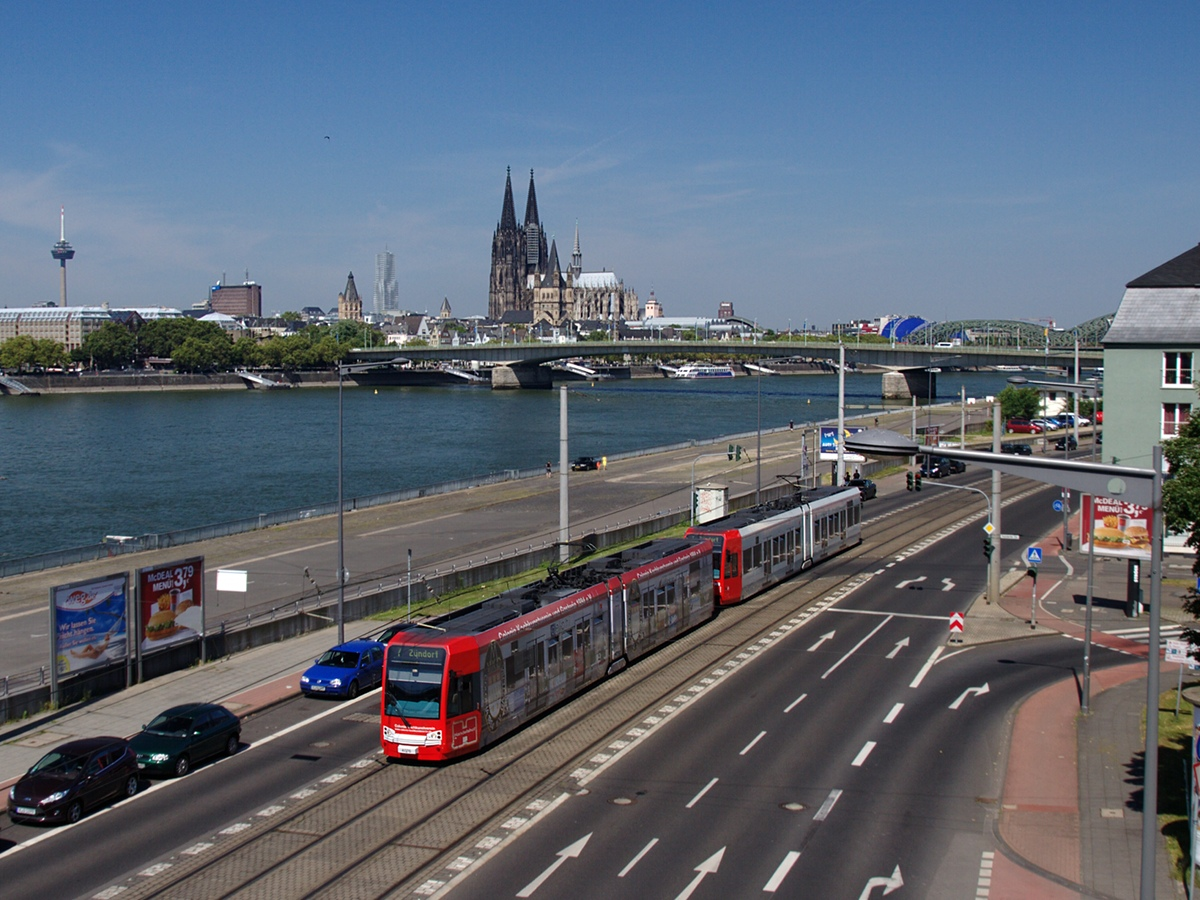
- Light rail trainset in front of the river Rhine and Cologne Cathedral

Overview
- Owner: Kölner Verkehrs-Betriebe
- Locale: Cologne (Köln); Germany
- Transit type: Light Rail (Stadtbahn)
- Number of lines: 12
- Number of stations: 236
- Daily ridership: 594,520 (2019)
- Annual ridership: 217,000,000 (2019)
- Website: kvb.koeln

Operation
- Began operation: 1877 (horsecar); 1900 (electric tram); 1968 (Stadtbahn)
- Operator: Kölner Verkehrs-Betriebe (KVB)
- Number of vehicles: 382 (2019)
- Train length: 60 m (196.85 ft)

Technical
- System length: 198.5 km (123.3 mi) (2019)
- Track gauge: 1,435 mm (4 ft 8 1/2 in) standard gauge
- Electrification: Overhead line, 750 V DC
- Average speed: 25.9 km/h (16.1 mph) (2019)
KVB system map

The Cologne Stadtbahn is a light rail system in the German city of Cologne, including several surrounding cities of the Cologne Bonn Region (Bergisch Gladbach, Bonn, Bornheim, Brühl, Frechen, Hürth, Leverkusen-Schlebusch, Wesseling). The term Stadtbahn denotes a system that encompasses elements of trams as well as an underground railway network (U-Bahn) and interurban rail, even including three lines that are licensed as heavy rail and used by freight trains as well as Stadtbahn vehicles. Two of these lines connect the Cologne Stadtbahn to the Bonn Stadtbahn. These lines (16 and 18) are jointly operated by both cities' transport authorities, resulting in both systems and the lines connecting them sometimes collectively referred to as Stadtbahn Rhein-Sieg.

The Cologne Stadtbahn is operated by the Kölner Verkehrsbetriebe (KVB) and the Bonn Stadtbahn is operated by the Stadtwerke Bonn (SWB – City of Bonn Utilities Division). The KVB and SWB are members of the Verkehrsverbund Rhein-Sieg (VRS – Rhein-Sieg Transit Authority), formed in 1987 to consolidate the transit authorities in the metropolitan Cologne area and operate a joint fare structure. There are 236 stations along 199 km (124 mi) of tracks, of which 42 are underground in 28 km (17 mi) of tunnels.

== History ==
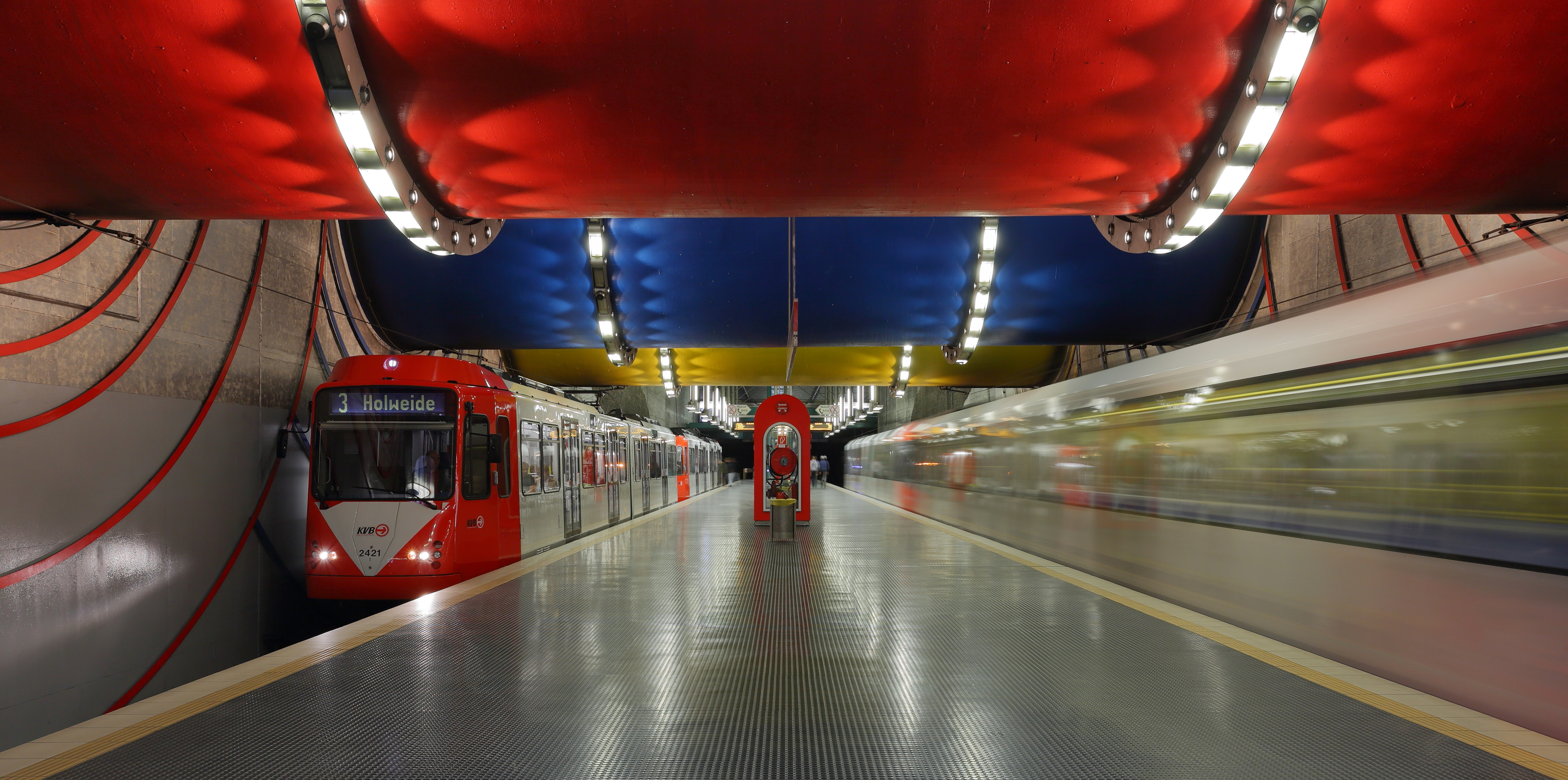
The Cologne Stadtbahn at Rochusplatz station

=== Horsecar and tram (1877–1960s) ===
The Cologne Stadtbahn traces its history to the first horsecar lines that started operating in 1877. Within a few years, several companies had built an extensive network. Because none of these companies showed interest in electrifying their lines, the city of Cologne bought them on 1 January 1900, and by 1907 all horsecar lines had been electrified or replaced by other services. Additional lines were built until 1912, including Vorortbahnen to surrounding villages outside the city limits. Outside the city center, these lines had segregated right-of-way and were more similar to "real" railroads than to trams.

The dense tram network in the city center that had been present before World War II was only partially rebuilt afterwards, and the Hauptbahnhof (Central Station) was not linked to important places like Neumarkt and Heumarkt for the time being. This was partly due to the plans to make Cologne a car friendly city which meant that old tramways (like the north–south one) were replaced by bus service; and also due to the planned widening of vehicles which wouldn't have fit through some of the narrow streets previously served by trams. Another question was the connection between the two banks of the Rhine which had been provided by the Hohenzollern-, Mülheim- and Deutzer Brücke, that were all destroyed during the war. A decision was taken to dedicate the Hohenzollern Bridge solely to interregional services, while the new Severins Bridge was only finished in 1959, allowing a restructuring of tram lines.

=== Upgrade to a Stadtbahn (1960s–present) ===
Already in 1956, the transportation plan of the city council intended a newly built tunnel through the city center in the north–south direction. An overground routing along the Nord-Süd-Fahrt (North-South-Road) would not have served many central areas and was rejected. The tunnel was not planned as a U-Bahn as in many other cities, but rather as an underground tram. This meant a design similar to overground trams with small turning radii, short distances between stops and low-floor platforms. At the end of the tunnels the trains were supposed to run as trams on the streets again, but in many places the trams were already separated from car traffic anyways. For this type of system – tunnels in highly congested areas, elsewhere mostly on or next to streets – the term Stadtbahn was later created. Similar concepts to separate rail and car traffic were later used in many cities in North Rhine-Westphalia and adjacent foreign cities (Brussels, Antwerp).

The term Stadtbahn is not regularly used, as the system is mostly referred to as U-Bahn and sometimes Straßenbahn (tram) by officials and the KVB, and most underground stations are also marked by a big white U on blue background which refers to U-Bahn. Most people in Cologne speak about the U-Bahn or Straßenbahn, or just about the train or the KVB.

When construction of the first tunnel started in 1963, there was no promise of the state NRW or the federal government to finance the project, and in the worst case the city would have had to pay completely on their own. With this background, the building of the Innenstadttunnel (city center tunnel) was begun. The tunnel opened in parts between 1968 and 1970 and was designed to be continued later, when more money and higher demand could make it necessary. This was the reason why no traditional U-Bahn (metro) was built in Cologne, which is as of 2023 the largest city in Europe not to have one. Nearly all tunnels completed afterwards aren't new routes, but rather overground sections of existing lines moved to the underground.

Beneficial to the expansion of the Stadtbahn were the Vorortbahnen that mostly ran on the right side of the Rhine and usually had their own right-of-ways. Another advantage was the previous use of 2.5 m (8 ft 2 in) wide trains instead of the usual 2.3 m (7 ft 7 in) other cities used for their trams, which made the adjustment for the new 2.65 m (8 ft 8 in) wide Stadtbahnwagen B easier.

After the Vorgebirgsbahn of the Köln-Bonner Eisenbahnen started serving Barbarossaplatz over Luxemburger Straße in 1898, the Rheinuferbahn used rail tracks of the trams from its start in 1906, beginning the mix of trams and interregional rail. The Köln-Frechen-Benzelrather Eisenbahn, which opened in 1893, was modified from metre-gauge to standard-gauge in 1914, and has been operated by the KVB since 1955 using EBO certified vehicles. The integration of the Rheinuferbahn and Vorgebirgsbahn was already planned in the mid-1960s, but had to be put off due to a lack of vehicles that could run on interregional rail and partially tunneled Stadtbahn.

As seen in other cities, the changing ideas on efficient traffic systems lead to differing needs for the system. An example of this is the length of the platforms. While the first platforms were designed for two coupled 30 m (98 ft) wagons, later the state NRW required space for three or sometimes four Stadtbahnwagen B, which lead to platforms of up to 110 m (360 ft) in length. The usually much shorter overground platforms currently only allow two wagons of collective 58 m (190 ft) length. Another changing factor was the routing itself: the curve radii were enlarged and at-grade crossings avoided. The outer parts of the tunnel network are designed for up to 70 km/h (43 mph), but the distance between stations is more similar to the previous tram network, which is why the top speed is rarely reached.

There is no plan for the final state of the network as in the U-Bahn of Berlin, Munich or Nuremberg. The lines and tunnels were built in the order which made most sense to relieve traffic at the time. Because of this and the financial insecurity if the state or federal government would finance more projects, many ramps going from the tunnels to the overground were built only provisorily to enable a later continuation of the tunnels, but no underground stations were designed to become multi-level stations serving different directions.

Initially the mixed use of trams and Stadtbahnen only allowed for low-floor platforms with a height of 35 cm (14 in), which meant that the high-floor Stadtbahnen had to be (and still are) equipped with stairs. In 1985 the first part of the network was built that was only accessible for high-floor trains with a platform height of 90 cm (35 in).

Since the summer of 2006, no more trams are in use in Cologne. But in the 1990s, the city council had decided to only convert part of the network for use with high-floor trains, that has since been upgraded almost completely. The first few lines were converted to low-floor operations in 1994, another few in 2003. This led to the curiosity that at some platforms the earlier-built escalators don't end at platform level, but a few steps above it, as it had been intended to raise those platforms to 90 cm (35 in).

Underground construction in downtown Cologne, one of Germany's oldest cities, is often obstructed by archeologists' legal rights to dig in all future building sites within the medieval city limits before all heavy construction machinery.

== Current routes ==
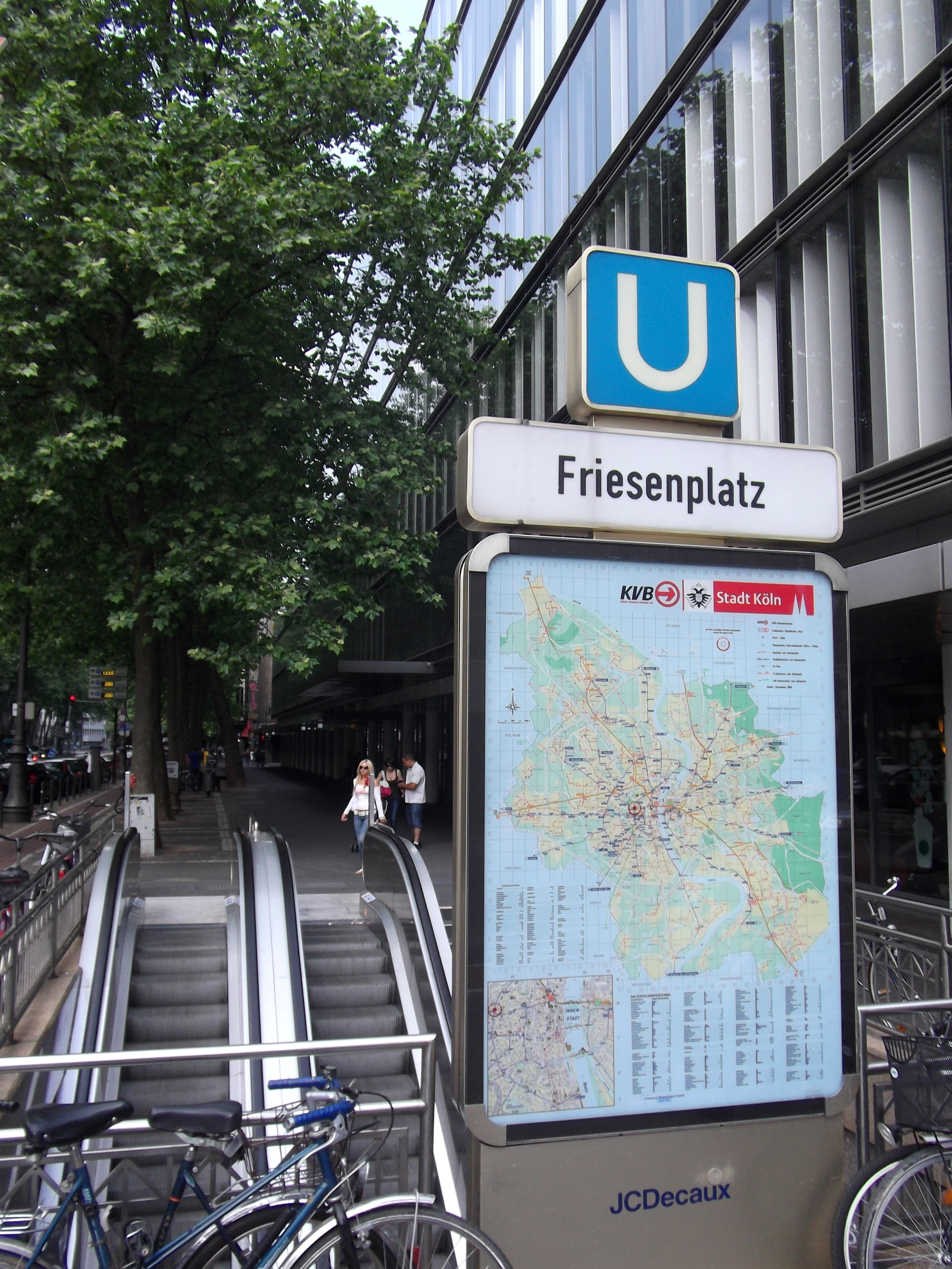
Entrance to Friesenplatz station on Hohenzollernring

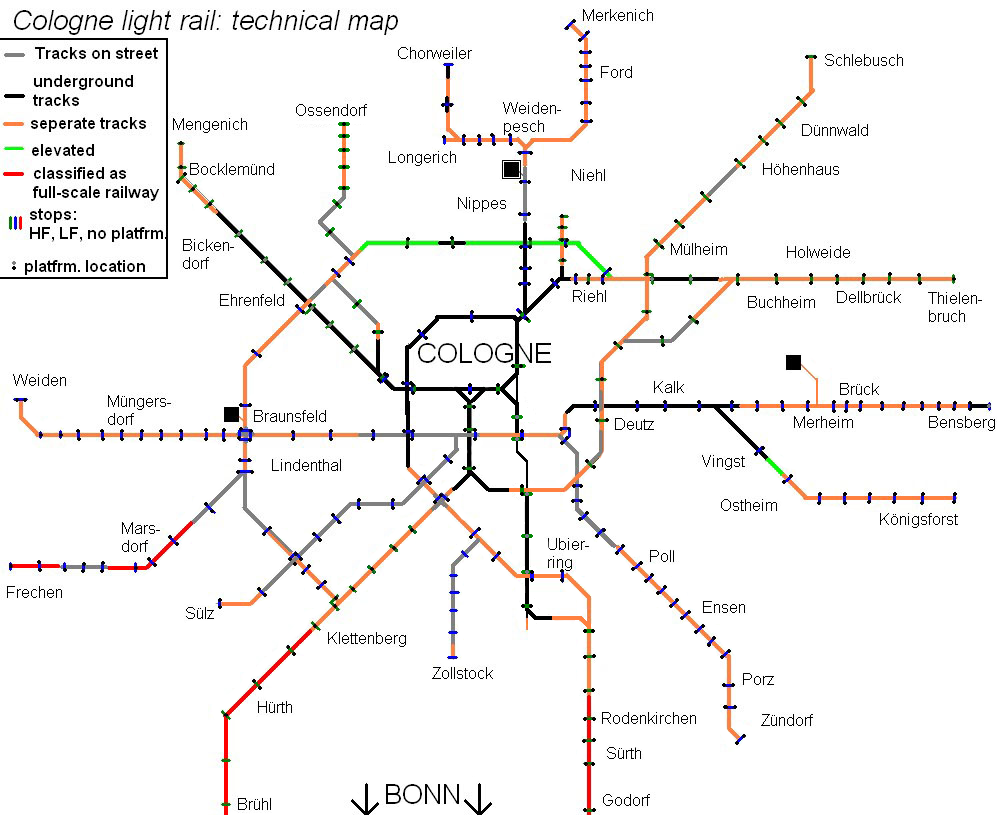
Technical map

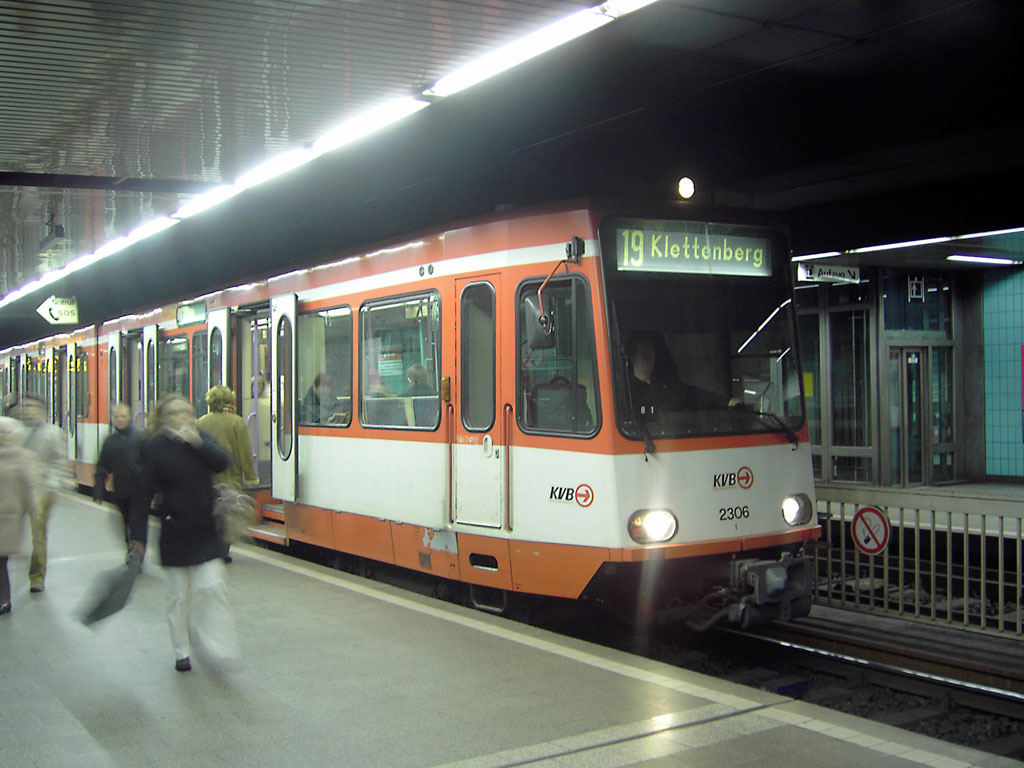
Appellhofplatz/Breite Straße station before renovation

Because the light rail network evolved from the tram network instead of replacing it, there were numerous stations served by both light rail and tram vehicles for almost three decades. While high platforms for step less entry into light rail vehicles could be built on the outer branches, stations in the city center had to have low platforms to support trams as well. The introduction of low-floor technology in the early 1990s promised wheelchair-accessible entry throughout the network without having to build several hundred high platforms. To allow the introduction of low-floor trains without having to demolish existing high platforms, the network was divided into two sub-networks of different floor heights.

On weekdays, all lines are served in 5 to 10 minute intervals from 6 am to 8 pm, with little or no service between around 1 am and about 4.30 am, and usually 15 minute intervals in the late night and early morning, as well as on Sundays. On weekends, there is an hourly service throughout the night. Because several lines overlap on the routes through the city center, some stations are served by up to 30 trains per hour in each direction.

	route	length	avg. speed
1	Weiden West – Junkersdorf – Neumarkt – Bf Deutz – Kalk Post – Kalk Kapelle – Brück – Refrath – Bensberg during peak hours 5-minute intervals Junkersdorf–Brück	26.5 km (16.5 mi)	27.2 km/h (16.9 mph)
3	Görlinger-Zentrum – Mengenich – Bocklemünd – Bickendorf – Bf Ehrenfeld – Bf West – Neumarkt – Bf Deutz – Buchheim – Holweide – Thielenbruch off-peak service ends at Holweide	20.1 km (12.5 mi)	26.2 km/h (16.3 mph)
4	Bocklemünd – Bickendorf – Bf Ehrenfeld – Bf West – Neumarkt – Bf Deutz – Mülheim, Wiener Platz – Dünnwald – Schlebusch evening service starts at Bickendorf	21.5 km (13.4 mi)	28.0 km/h (17.4 mph)
5	Sparkasse Am Butzweilerhof – Ossendorf – Neuehrenfeld – Bf West – Dom/Hbf – Rathaus – Heumarkt	10.3 km (6.4 mi)	20.4 km/h (12.7 mph)
7	Frechen – Marsdorf – Braunsfeld – Neumarkt – Poll – Porz – Zündorf; Frechen–Braunsfeld served in 20-minute intervals except for peak hours	25.5 km (15.8 mi)	25.5 km/h (15.8 mph)
9	Sülz – Universität – Bf Süd – Neumarkt – Bf Deutz – Kalk Post – Kalk Kapelle – Ostheim – Königsforst; 5-minute intervals Universität–Bf Deutz except for school holidays	15.4 km (9.6 mi)	25.0 km/h (15.5 mph)
12	Merkenich – Niehl – Ebertplatz – Hansaring – Ringe – Zollstock; Merkenich–Niehl served in 20-minute intervals from 9am to 1pm	16.5 km (10.3 mi)	22.0 km/h (13.7 mph)
13	Sülzgürtel – Aachener Str. – Bf Ehrenfeld – Gürtel – Bf Mülheim – Buchheim – Holweide	16.2 km (10.1 mi)	28.9 km/h (18.0 mph)
15	Chorweiler – Longerich – Ebertplatz – Hansaring – Ringe – Ubierring during peak hours 5-minute intervals Longerich–Ubierring	15.2 km (9.4 mi)	24.0 km/h (14.9 mph)
16	Niehl, Sebastianstraße – Dom/Hbf – Neumarkt – Ubierring – Sürth – Wesseling – Bonn Hbf – Bonn-Bad-Godesberg; 20-minute intervals from Sürth (during peak hours from Wesseling)	44.3 km (27.5 mi)	33.3 km/h (20.7 mph)
17	Severinstr. – Chlodwigplatz – Rodenkirchen (– Sürth); Monday to Friday, 7:00 to 8:00 and 16:30 to 18:00 to Sürth	8.5 km (5.3 mi)	
18	Thielenbruch – Buchheim – Bf Mülheim – Dom/Hbf – Neumarkt – Klettenberg – Brühl – Bonn Hbf; 5-minute intervals Buchheim–Klettenberg, 20-minute intervals from Brühl	46.4 km (28.8 mi)	33.4 km/h (20.8 mph)

=== Low-floor lines ===
==== East-West lines ====
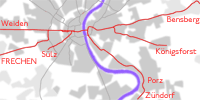
East-West network

The first step towards a low-floor light rail network was concentrating four lines on similar routes into a common east–west-corridor in 1994. These lines were quickly equipped with low platforms 35 cm (14 in) above street level on every single station. While there are some stretches that can be described as classic tramway lines, the majority of the east–west-network has been upgraded to a high standard with long sections having segregated right-of-way, justifying the term "low-floor light rail" (Niederflurstadtbahn).

In 2006, during the 2006 FIFA World Cup, route 1 was extended to Weiden-West, via Schulstraße, which connects to the RheinEnergieStadion.

In 2007, Line 8, which previously operated during peak hours, stopped service. All its runs were integrated into the schedules of Lines 7 and 9.

- : Weiden West (S-Bahn) – Junkersdorf – Rheinenergiestadion – Aachener Straße/Gürtel – Rudolfplatz – Neumarkt – Bf Deutz/Messe – Kalk – Brück – Refrath – Bensberg
- : Frechen – Marsdorf – Aachener Straße/Gürtel – Rudolfplatz – Neumarkt – Poll – Porz – Zündorf
- : Sülz – Zülpicher Straße/Gürtel – University – Zülpicher Platz – Neumarkt – Bf Deutz/Messe – Kalk – Vingst – Ostheim – Rath/Heumar – Königsforst

==== Ring lines ====
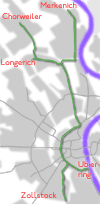
The Ring network

When it became clear to city authorities that the construction of a large number of additional high platforms was not financially feasible, other options were investigated. It was deemed most economical to create a second low-floor network and equip the remaining lines with high platforms. Between the stations "Ebertplatz" and "Barbarossaplatz", there are two possible routes. It was decided that the future low-floor lines would be concentrated in the tunnel underneath the Cologne Ring road, while high-floor lines would use the tunnel under the Central station.

This change was implemented in December 2003, after the high platforms at the Hansaring station were removed. In 2006, the tracks of the Chorweiler station were raised with additional gravel. Since then, all "Ringe" lines are operated with low-floor vehicles. In 2007, Line 6, which had only operated during peak hours, was replaced by additional trains of Line 15.

- : Merkenich – Fordwerke – Wilh.-Sollmann-Straße – Ebertplatz – Friesenplatz – Barbarossaplatz – Eifelstraße – Zollstock
- : Chorweiler – Longerich – Wilh.-Sollmann-Straße – Ebertplatz – Friesenplatz – Barbarossaplatz – Eifelstraße – Chlodwigplatz – Ubierring

=== High-floor lines ===
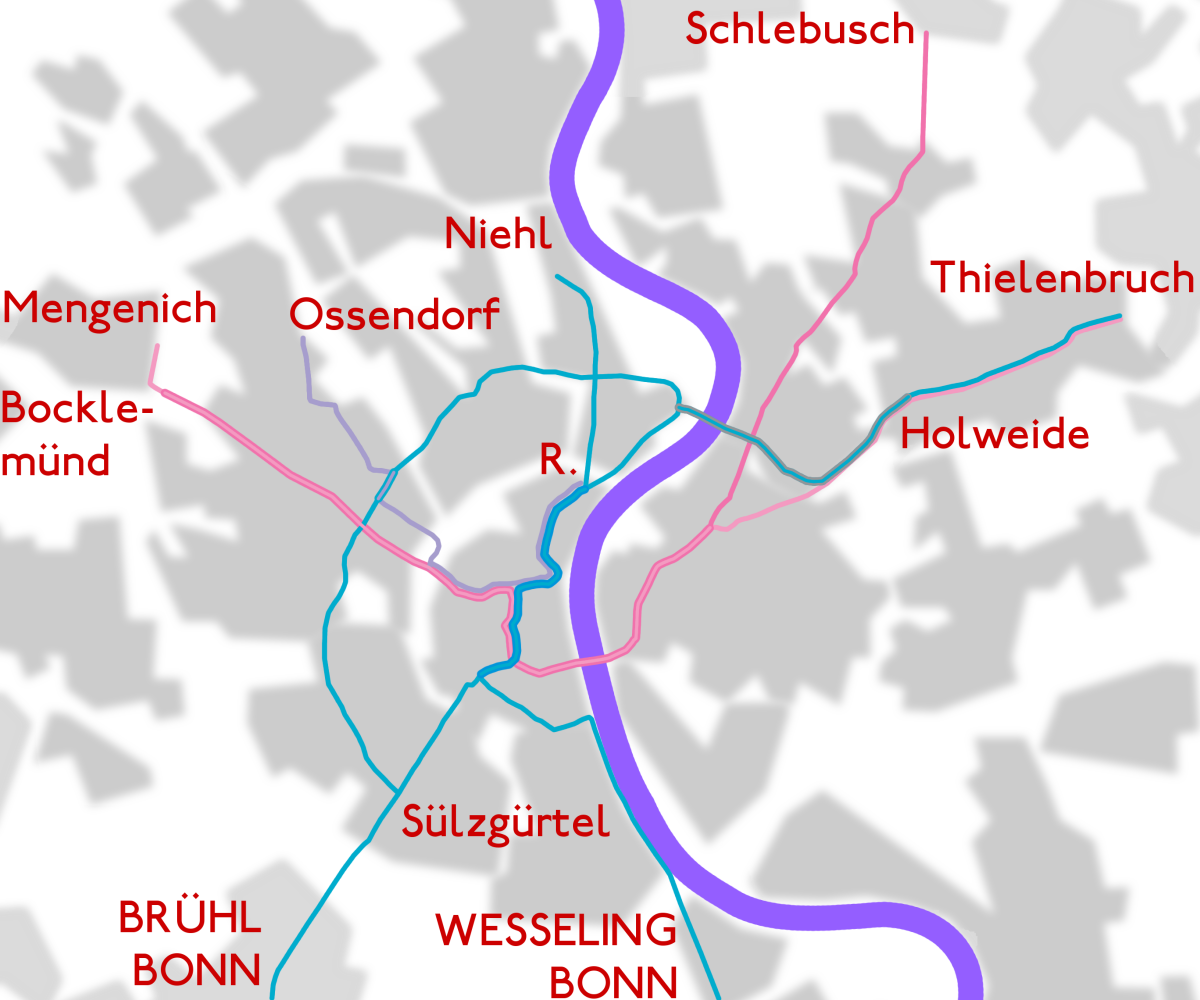
high-floor sub-network

The high-floor network consists of all lines operated by "classic" light rail vehicles with a floor height of roughly one meter above street level. Since separation from the low-floor network, high platforms are being built in stations in the city center at one or two per year. As of 2022, the most frequented stations have been upgraded except for the Barbarossaplatz station.

Since the construction of temporary platforms at the Severinstraße station while the actual station gets modernized and connected to the North-Southern tunnel, lines 3 and 4 are Cologne's first HF lines completely equipped with level entrance. The western branch of Line 5 still has two stops (Subbelrather Straße/Gürtel and Nußbaumerstraße, both shared with Line 13) with low platforms, the rest of its stations were made high-floor when the line was extended into the Butzweilerhof industrial area.

Line 13 is also called the "beltway" (Gürtel) line because it is the only line that does not touch the city center. Line 13 is also called the Outer Ring line, while Lines 12 and 15 together can be called the inner ring line. Most of the line runs along a series of roads of the same name. The northern part of Line 13 is built as an elevated railway. High-floor platforms are still very rare on this line, because it shares three platforms (Dürener Straße, Wüllnerstraße, Aachener Straße/Gürtel) with the low-floor line 7 and many parts of the platforms are lined with old trees, making the upgrade more difficult.

Since the timetable change on 13 December 2015, a section of the north–south rail has been operated by line 17. From Severinstraße it runs through the newly built tunnel to Bonner Wall, after which it joins line 16 at Schönhauser Str. and runs alongside it to Rodenkirchen Bf. In the morning and evening peak (07:00 to 08:00 and 16:30 to 18:00), the line runs further to Sürth.

Lines 16 and 18 are the longest lines in the network, connecting Cologne to Bonn via railway lines.

- : Mengenich – Bocklemünd – Venloer Straße/Gürtel – Hans-Böckler-Platz – Friesenplatz – Neumarkt – Severinstraße – Bf Deutz/LANxess Arena – Buchheim – Holweide – Dellbrück – Thielenbruch
- : Bocklemünd – Venloer Straße/Gürtel – Hans-Böckler-Platz – Friesenplatz – Neumarkt – Severinstraße – Bf Deutz/LANxess Arena – Mülheim – Höhenhaus –Dünnwald – Schlebusch
- : Sparkasse Am Butzweilerhof – IKEA Am Butzweilerhof – Alter Flughafen Butzweilerhof – Rektor-Klein-Straße – Margaretastraße – Iltisstraße – Lenauplatz – Nußbaumerstraße – Subbelrather Str./Gürtel – Liebigstraße – Gutenbergstraße – Hans-Böckler-Platz – Friesenplatz – Appellhofplatz – Dom/Hbf (Central Station) – Rathaus – Heumarkt
- : Sülzgürtel – Zülpicher Straße/Gürtel – Dürener Straße/Gürtel – Aachener Straße/Gürtel – Venloer Straße/Gürtel – Subbelrather Straße/Gürtel – Nußbaumer Straße – Escher Straße – Neusser Straße/Gürtel – Amsterdamer Straße/Gürtel – Slabystraße – Mülheim – Buchheim – Holweide
- : Bonn-Bad Godesberg – Bonn Hbf (Main Station) – Wesseling – Sürth – Rodenkirchen – Ubierring – Barbarossaplatz – Neumarkt – Dom/Hbf (Central Station) – Ebertplatz – Reichensperger Platz – Niehl
- : Severinstraße – Chlodwigplatz – Rodenkirchen (– Sürth)
  Monday to Friday, 7:00 to 8:00 and 16:30 to 18:00 to Sürth
- : Bonn Hbf (Main Station) – Brühl – Klettenberg – Sülzgürtel – Barbarossaplatz – Neumarkt – Dom/Hbf (Central Station) – Ebertplatz – Reichensperger Platz – Slabystraße – Mülheim – Buchheim – Holweide – Dellbrück – Thielenbruch

== Former lines ==
A list of old routes of lines and lines that stopped service. If a line's route only changed because it was expanded on one end, that change is not listed here. The highest line number ever used on the system was 27 in the 1930s.

Line	Route	from	to
1	Weiden Schulstr.- Junkersdorf – Müngersdorf – Braunsfeld – Rudolfplatz – Neumarkt – Heumarkt – Deutz/Messe – Kalk – Höhenberg – Merheim – Brück – Refrath – Bensberg	16 June 2002	27 May 2006
1	Junkersdorf – Müngersdorf – Braunsfeld – Rudolfplatz – Neumarkt – Heumarkt – Deutz/Messe – Kalk – Höhenberg – Merheim – Brück – Refrath – Bensberg	2 August 1980	15 June 2002
1	Sülz, Hermeskeiler Platz – Universität – Zülpicher Platz – Neumarkt – Heumarkt – Deutz/Messe – Kalk – Höhenberg – Merheim – Brück – Refrath – Bensberg	19 October 1970	1 August 1980
1	Bocklemünd – Bickendorf – Venloer Str./Gürtel – Hans-Böckler-Platz – Brabanter Str. – Rudolfplatz – Neumarkt – Heumarkt – Deutz/Messe – Kalk – Höhenberg – Merheim – Brück – Refrath – Bensberg	12 June 1967	18 October 1970
2	stopped service	30 May 1999	
2	Benzelrath – Frechen – Marsdorf – Lindenthal – Braunsfeld – Rudolfplatz – Neumarkt (– Heumarkt – Deutz – Poll – Porz – Zündorf)	25 September 1994	30 May 1999
2	Benzelrath – Frechen – Marsdorf – Lindenthal – Braunsfeld – Rudolfplatz – Neumarkt (– Heumarkt – Deutz/Messe – Kalk – Vingst – Ostheim)	2 August 1980	24 September 1994
2	Sülz, Hermeskeiler Platz – Universität – Zülpicher Platz – Neumarkt – Heumarkt – Deutz – Vingst – Ostheim	19 October 1970	2 August 1980
2	Zollstock, Südfriedhof – Barbarossaplatz – Neumarkt – Dom/Hbf.	6 October 1969	18 October 1970
2	Zollstock, Südfriedhof – Barbarossaplatz – Zülpicher Platz – Mauritiuskirche – Neumarkt – Poststraße – Barbarossaplatz – Zollstock, Südfriedhof	12 June 1967	5 October 1969
3	Bocklemünd – Venloer Str./Gürtel – Hans-Böckler-Platz – Friesenplatz – Appellhofplatz – Neumarkt – Severinstr. – Bf. Deutz/Messe – Buchheim – Holweide – Dellbrück – Thielenbruch	19 October 1970	15 June 2002
3	during U-Bahn construction only from Venloer Str./Gürtel	16 September 1989	30 May 1992
3	Bickendorf, Schleife am Erlenweg – Akazienweg – Venloer Str./Gürtel – Hans-Böckler-Platz – Brabanter Str. – Rudolfplatz – Neumarkt – Kleiner Griechenmarkt – Severinsbrücke – Bf. Deutz/Messe – Buchheim – Holweide – Dellbrück – Thielenbruch	12 June 1967	18 October 1970
4	Bickendorf, Äußere Kanalstraße – Subbelrather Straße/Gürtel – Hans-Böckler-Platz – Friesenplatz – Appellhofplatz – Neumarkt – Severinstr. – Bf. Deutz/Messe – Mülheim – Höhenhaus – Dünnwald – Schlebusch;	24 June 1989	30 May 1992
4	Bocklemünd – Subbelrather Straße/Gürtel – Hans-Böckler-Platz – Friesenplatz – Appellhofplatz – Neumarkt – Severinstr. – Bf. Deutz/Messe – Mülheim – Höhenhaus – Dünnwald – Schlebusch;	24 April 1985	23 June 1989
4	Bocklemünd – Venloer Str./Gürtel – Hans-Böckler-Platz – Friesenplatz – Appellhofplatz – Neumarkt – Severinstr. – Bf. Deutz/Messe – Mülheim – Höhenhaus – Dünnwald – Schlebusch;	7 January 1975	23 April 1985
4	Bickendorf, Akazienweg – Venloer Str./Gürtel – Hans-Böckler-Platz – Friesenplatz – Appellhofplatz – Neumarkt – Severinstr. – Bf. Deutz/Messe – Mülheim – Höhenhaus – Dünnwald – Schlebusch;	19 October 1970	6 January 1975
4	Rudolfplatz (Moltkestr.) – Neumarkt – Severinstr. – Bf. Deutz/Messe – Mülheim – Höhenhaus, Neurather Weg;	8 April 1968	18 October 1970
5	Am Butzweilerhof – Ossendorf – Neuehrenfeld – Friesenplatz – Dom/Hbf. – Rathaus	December 2012	December 2013
5	Am Butzweilerhof – Ossendorf – Neuehrenfeld – Friesenplatz – Dom/Hbf. – Ebertplatz – Reichenspergerplatz	December 2010	December 2012
5	Ossendorf – Neuehrenfeld – Friesenplatz – Dom/Hbf. – Ebertplatz – Reichenspergerplatz	23 May 1993	December 2010
5	Ossendorf – Neuehrenfeld – Friesenplatz – Dom/Hbf. – Ebertplatz – Reichenspergerplatz – Zoo/Flora – Mülheim – Höhenhaus, Neurather Weg	9 November 1986	22 May 1993
5	Ossendorf – Neuehrenfeld – Friesenplatz – Dom/Hbf. – Ebertplatz – Reichenspergerplatz	25 August 1974	8 November 1986
6	stopped service	June 2007	
6	Longerich – Weidenpesch – Nippes – Ebertplatz („6 Nord“)	October 2006	June 2007
6	Dom/Hbf – Neumarkt – Barbarossaplatz – Chlodwigplatz – Ubierring („6 Süd“)	October 2006	June 2007
6	Longerich – Weidenpesch – Nippes – Ebertplatz – Friesenplatz – Rudolfplatz – Barbarossaplatz – Chlodwigplatz – Ubierring	September 2002	October 2006
6	Longerich – Weidenpesch – Nippes – Ebertplatz – Friesenplatz – Rudolfplatz – Barbarossaplatz – Chlodwigplatz – Bayenthal – Marienburg, Südpark	27 July 1974	7 September 2002
6	(HVZ: Fordwerke, Ölhafen -) Niehl – Weidenpesch – Nippes – Ebertplatz – Friesenplatz – Rudolfplatz – Barbarossaplatz – Chlodwigplatz – Bayenthal – Marienburg, Südpark	19 October 1970	26 July 1974
7	Sülz, Hermeskeiler Platz – Universität – Zülpicher Platz – Neumarkt – Heumarkt – Deutz – Poll – Porz – Zündorf	2 August 1980	29 May 1999
7	Junkersdorf – Müngersdorf – Melaten – Rudolfplatz – Neumarkt – Heumarkt – Deutz – Poll – Porz – Zündorf	12 June 1967	2 August 1980
8	stopped service	June 2007	
8	Universität – Zülpicher Platz – Neumarkt (– Poll – Porz) / (– Bf. Deutz/Messe)	1999	June 2007
8	stopped service	2 August 1980	1999
8	Müngersdorf (Stadion) – Melaten – Rudolfplatz – Neumarkt – Heumarkt – Deutz/Messe – Kalk – Höhenberg – Merheim – Brück (– Refrath)	8 April 1968	2 August 1980
9	Chorweiler – Heimersdorf – Longerich – Nippes – Ebertplatz – Dom/Hbf – Neumarkt – Deutz – Kalk – Vingst – Ostheim – Rath-Heumar – Königsforst	17 November 1973	24 September 1994
9	Heimersdorf – Longerich – Nippes – Ebertplatz – Dom/Hbf – Neumarkt – Deutz – Kalk – Vingst – Ostheim – Rath-Heumar – Königsforst	18 May 1971	16 November 1973
9	Longerich – Nippes – Ebertplatz – Dom/Hbf – Neumarkt – Deutz – Kalk – Vingst – Ostheim – Rath-Heumar – Königsforst	19 October 1970	17 May 1971
9	Longerich – Niehl – Fordwerke, Ölhafen	12 June 1967	18 October 1970
10	stopped service	26 September 1994	
10	Zollstock, Südfriedhof – Barbarossaplatz – Rudolfplatz – Friesenplatz – Ebertplatz – Nippes – Niehl – Merkenich	31 October 1987	26 September 1994
10	Klettenberg – Barbarossaplatz – Rudolfplatz – Friesenplatz – Ebertplatz – Nippes – Niehl – Fordwerke, Ölhafen;	25 August 1974	9 November 1986
10	Klettenberg – Barbarossaplatz – Rudolfplatz – Friesenplatz – Ebertplatz – Nippes – Weidenpesch – Longerich;	6 October 1969	27 July 1974
11	stopped service	9 November 1986	
11	Klettenberg – Barbarossaplatz – Neumarkt – Dom/Hbf – Ebertplatz – Mülheim – Höhenhaus, Neurather Weg	27 July 1974	9 November 1986
12	Zollstock, Südfriedhof – Barbarossaplatz – Neumarkt – Dom/Hbf. – Ebertplatz – Nippes – Niehl – Merkenich	18 October 1970	December 2003
13	Sülzgürtel – Lindenthal – Braunsfeld – Ehrenfeld – Nippes – Riehl – Mülheim – Höhenhaus, Neurather Weg	23 May 1993	31 May 1997
13	Sülzgürtel – Lindenthal – Braunsfeld – Ehrenfeld – Nippes – Riehl – Mülheim, Wiener Platz	25 August 1974	22 May 1993
13	Sülzgürtel – Lindenthal – Braunsfeld – Ehrenfeld – Neuehrenfeld, Takuplatz	23 October 1972	25 August 1974
13	Sülzgürtel – Lindenthal – Braunsfeld – Ehrenfeld – Bilderstöckchen, Longericher Str.	30 September 1963	22 October 1972
14	stopped service	27 May 2003	
14	KölnMesse – Deutz/Messe – Neumarkt – Dom/Hbf. (Fair days only)	17 January 1984	27 May 2003
15	Thielenbruch – Dellbrück – Buchheim – Mülheim – Ebertplatz – Friesenplatz – Rudolfplatz – Barbarossaplatz – Chlodwigplatz – Ubierring	25 September 1994	13 December 2003
15	Thielenbruch – Dellbrück – Buchheim – Mülheim – Ebertplatz – Friesenplatz – Rudolfplatz – Barbarossaplatz – Chlodwigplatz – Ubierring – Rodenkirchen – Sürth	12 August 1978	24 September 1994
15	Ossendorf – Neuehrenfeld – Friesenplatz – Neumarkt – Severinsbrücke – Deutz – Mülheim – Höhenhaus, Neurather Weg (peak hours only)	19 October 1970	23 October 1972
16	Bonn-Bad Godesberg – Bonn Hbf – Wesseling – Sürth – Rodenkirchen – Ubierring – Barbarossaplatz – Rudolfplatz – Friesenplatz – Ebertplatz – Niehl, Sebastianstr.	October 2006	June 2007
16	Bonn-Bad Godesberg – Bonn Hbf – Wesseling – Sürth – Rodenkirchen – Ubierring – Barbarossaplatz – Neumarkt – Dom/Hbf – Ebertplatz – Mülheim – Buchheim, Herler Straße	1997	2003
16	Bonn-Bad Godesberg – Bonn Hbf – Wesseling – Sürth – Rodenkirchen – Ubierring – Barbarossaplatz – Neumarkt – Dom/Hbf – Ebertplatz – Mülheim, Wiener Platz	12 August 1978	31 May 1997
16	Rodenkirchen, Siegfriedstraße – Rheinufer – Ubierring – Chlodwigplatz – Barbarossaplatz – Rudolfplatz – Friesenplatz – Ebertplatz – Mülheim – Holweide – Dellbrück – Thielenbruch		11 August 1978
17	stopped service	October 2006	December 2015
17	Ubierring – Chlodwigplatz – Barbarossaplatz – Neumarkt – Dom/Hbf – Ebertplatz – Mülheim – Buchheim, Herler Straße (evenings and weekends only)	December 2003	October 2006
17	Ubierring – Chlodwigplatz – Barbarossaplatz – Rudolfplatz – Friesenplatz – Ebertplatz – Niehl, Sebastianstraße (evenings and weekends only)	31 May 1997	December 2003
17	Klettenbergpark – Barbarossaplatz – Neumarkt – Dom/Hbf – Ebertplatz – Reichenspergerplatz	9 November 1986	1992
18	Bonn Hbf – Brühl – Klettenberg – Sülzgürtel – Barbarossaplatz – Rudolfplatz – Friesenplatz – Ebertplatz – Mülheim – Buchheim – Dellbrück – Thielenbruch	October 2006	June 2007
18	Bonn Hbf – Brühl – Klettenberg – Sülzgürtel – Barbarossaplatz – Neumarkt – Dom/Hbf – Ebertplatz – Nippes – Longerich – Heimersdorf – Chorweiler	September 1994	October 2003
18	Bonn Hbf – Brühl – Klettenberg – Sülzgürtel – Barbarossaplatz – Neumarkt – Dom/Hbf – Ebertplatz – Mülheim	9 November 1986	September 1994
18	Bonn, Rheinuferbahnhof – Brühl – Klettenberg – Sülzgürtel – Barbarossaplatz; Operated by Cologne-Bonn Railways	12 August 1978	9 November 1986
19	stopped service	5 August 2007	
19	Klettenberg – Sülzgürtel – Barbarossaplatz – Neumarkt – Dom/Hbf ("19 Süd")	9 October 2006	5 August 2007
19	Breslauer Platz – Ebertplatz – Mülheim – Buchheim, Herler Str. ("19 Nord")	9 October 2006	5 August 2007
19	Klettenberg – Sülzgürtel – Barbarossaplatz – Neumarkt – Dom/Hbf – Ebertplatz – Mülheim – Buchheim, Herler Str.	15 December 2003	8 October 2006
19	Klettenberg – Sülzgürtel – Barbarossaplatz – Rudolfplatz – Friesenplatz – Ebertplatz – Niehl, Sebastianstr.	31 May 1992	14 December 2003
19	Hürth-Hermülheim – Klettenberg – Sülzgürtel – Barbarossaplatz – Rudolfplatz – Friesenplatz – Ebertplatz – Niehl, Sebastianstr.	27 September 1991	30 May 1992
19	Hürth-Hermülheim – Klettenberg – Sülzgürtel – Barbarossaplatz – Rudolfplatz – Friesenplatz – Ebertplatz – Nippes – Weidenpesch – Niehl	9 November 1986	26 September 1991
19	Brühl Mitte – Brühl Ost – Berzdorf – Wesseling; Inter-city operated by Cologne-Bonn Railways	12 August 1978	31 May 1981
19	Longerich – Nippes – Ebertplatz – Friesenplatz – Rudolfplatz – Neumarkt – Deutz – Kalk – Vingst – Ostheim – Rath-Heumar – Königsforst	5 October 1964	19 October 1970
20	stopped service	2 August 1980	
20	Benzelrath – Frechen – Marsdorf – Lindenthal – Braunsfeld – Rudolfplatz – Neumarkt	10 October 1969	2 August 1980
20	Benzelrath – Frechen – Marsdorf – Lindenthal – Braunsfeld – Rudolfplatz – Neumarkt (– Heumarkt – Deutz – Poll not so frequent)	6 October 1969	9 October 1969
20	Klettenberg – Barbarossaplatz – Rudolfplatz – Friesenplatz – Ebertplatz – Nippes – Niehl – Fordwerke, Ölhafen;	10 June 1967	8 April 1968

== Past expansion ==
Due to the lack of an overarching plan on the expansion of the network, there's no single point when the tram became the Stadtbahn, and the expansion projects since the building of the Innenstadttunnel will be listed chronologically.

=== Innenstadt tunnel ===

The Innenstadt tunnel (English: inner city tunnel) was opened in several parts from 1968 to 1970. The first part served from Dom/Hbf to Appellhofplatz, reaching the surface through a temporary ramp at Friesenplatz, and in the following year, the section Appellhofplatz – Barbarossaplatz was added. At the station Appellhofplatz, a triangular junction was built, with the tunnel from Friesenplatz to Dom/Hbf passing under the rest of the railways. In October 1970, the sections Poststraße – Severinsbridge and Dom/Hbf – Breslauer Platz followed, with a temporary ramp built at Breslauer Platz. The ramp at Barbarossaplatz was also intended to only be temporary, but is still in use to this day (2023).

Because the Innenstadttunnel was built as an underground tram, it has small curve radii and level junctions at Appellhofplatz and Poststraße. Currently (2022) the tunnel is served by three lines with 10 min headway and one with 5 min headway.

=== Chorweiler extension ===

In the 1970s, tracks were extended to the commuter town Chorweiler. This extension was the first in Cologne to be built metro-like from the start. In 1971, the first 2.3-kilometre-long (1.4 mi) section was constructed on an exclusive right-of-way. It starts from existing tram lines to the north, crosses under the Militärringsstraße and over the A1 to the underground Heimersdorf station. The line ended in a temporary loop about 200 m (660 ft) farther to the south.

In 1973, the extension was completed at an underground terminus at Köln-Chorweiler station, which is shared with the S-Bahn line S11. Since 2003, line 15 operates this part of the network.

=== Ebertplatz and Nippes tunnels ===

Another major extension came in 1974 with the opening of the Ebertplatz and Nippes tunnels.

The north-south portion of the tunnel was an extension of the Innenstadttunnel under Neusser Straße, adding underground stations at Ebertplatz (shared with the west-east tunnel), Lohsestraße, Florastraße, and Neusser Straße/Gürtel. This tunnel was considered a priority because Neusser Straße is a relatively narrow main street and was the most used part of the network outside the city center at the time. Because of financing problems, the tunnel ended just before Mollwitzstraße station instead of continuing to the split of the line at Wilhelm-Sollman-Straße station, and the ramp was built as a temporary solution, enabling the later continuation of the tunnel.

The west-east portion of the tunnel put trains under the Cologne Ring for the first time. From west to east, trains went underground at a temporary ramp just past Christophstraße station, served new underground stations at Hansaring, Ebertplatz (shared with the north-south tunnel) and Reichenspergerplatz, before returning to the surface at a ramp west of Zoo/Flora station. Turning loops were built at both ends.

The two lines meet at Ebertplatz station, which was designed to minimize the number of times trains would need to crossover tracks to maximize the efficiency of the station and tunnels.

=== Gürtel Hochbahn (elevated railway) ===
At the same time as the tunnels in Nippes, an elevated railway was finished for line 13 following the Gürtel, which at the time was planned to be extended from Bilderstöckchen to the Mülheim Bridge. The line starts at Nußbaumerstraße up to where line 13 runs in the middle of the Gürtel, and connects it with the Mülheim Bridge. The Cologne-Neuss railway however is crossed underneath, at which a station (Geldernstraße/Parkgürtel) creates a connection to S-Bahn services. At the approach to the Mülheim Bridge the line joins the also junction-free line from the zoo. To create enough space for climbing the elevation change, the two lines cross at the station Slabystraße before joining farther along the bridge. This and the tunnels in Nippes meant that Cologne now had the longest underground/elevated railway networks of German cities that started those systems after World-War 2.

=== Deutz/Kalk ===

The first tunnel to the east of the Rhine was opened in the years 1976 to 1983. After the station Frankfurter Straße had already been lowered in 1964, the ramp to the first part of the tunnel with the station Fuldaer Straße was built there. The subsequent tunnels in Kalk, Vingst and Deutz followed in 1980, 1981 and 1983. The branch to Königsforst joins at station Kalk Kapelle without a junction by crossing under. Between the stations Deutz Technische Hochschule and Bf Deutz/Messe a small underground parking facility was created, and in the station Kalk Post a bunker was built.

At the same time as the tunnels were built, the Deutz Bridge was widened by building another bridge with the same profile to its south, and then moved next to the existing one. With this new construction, the Stadtbahn got a dedicated track through the middle of the bridge.

=== Rheinuferbahn ===

Since 1978 line 16 operates as an overland-line. At the station Marienburg (since renamed to Heinrich-Lübke-Ufer) it diverges from its previous routing to the center of Rodenkirchen to the Rheinuferbahn of the Köln-Bonner Eisenbahnen (Cologne-Bonn railways) which it follows to Bonn. Different to the solution later used in Karlsruhe, the railway was changed to accommodate Stadtbahn vehicles, instead of equipping Stadtbahn vehicles with the technology needed to be used on mainline railways. The Rheinuferbahn was converted to Stadtbahn service by changing its electrification from 1200 V to 750 V, upgrading the train protection system and retrofitting the switches for the smaller wheels of the Stadtbahn vehicles. The line is still operated as a railway under EBO, with mixed freight and passenger services running on parts of it. Line 16 was the first time, that vehicles from Bonn entered Cologne's network.

=== Friesenplatz – Gutenbergstraße ===

The Innenstadttunnel was continued from the station Friesenplatz in 1985. It diverges grade separated from the tunnel to Ehrenfeld at Hans-Böckler-Platz/Bahnhof West where elevators go directly from the underground station's platforms to the ones of Köln West station. The tunnel then turns north beneath the green belt and reaches the surface at the station Gutenbergstraße. During the construction of the tunnel under Venloer Straße the tunnel was used by lines 3 and 4, while usually it is only served by line 5.

=== Vorgebirgsbahn ===
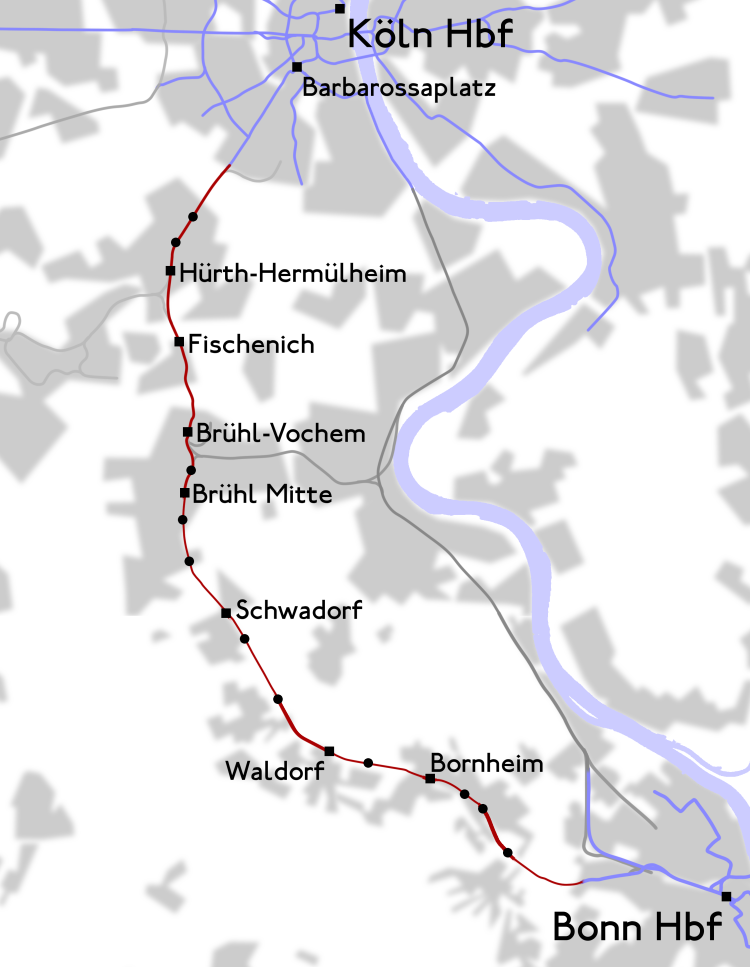

Like the Rheinuferbahn 8 years before, the Vorgebirgsbahn was completely converted to Stadtbahn operations in 1986. Already since the electrification in the 1930s, the trams and Vorgebirgsbahn shared tracks between Barbarossaplatz and Klettenberg. With the conversion to Stadtbahn, the tram lines 10 and 11 were replaced by the Stadtbahn, which meant that the turning loop was replaced by a turning rail. In 1990 to 1992 the platforms were converted to high-floor platforms (except for Barbarossaplatz).

=== Ring tunnel ===

Since October 1987 a tunnel exists under the Cologne Ring. It continues the tunnel at from Hansaring and crosses under the lines 1 and 7 at Rudolfplatz. At Friesenplatz it crosses under the Innenstadttunnel which forms the currently (2022) only completely underground station junction which is a bit messy because of the stacked side-platforms. At Zülpicher Platz the tunnel ends in a ramp to the surface.

The station Rudolfplatz was also designed as a bunker.

The station Christophstraße/Mediapark was the location of the worst accident in the recent history of the Stadtbahn in 1999, when a CitySprinter prototype hit a standing train at 50 km/h (31 mph).

=== Ehrenfeld ===

The tunnel through Ehrenfeld was opened in two parts: the line from Hans-Böckler-Platz to Venloer Straße/Gürtel, where a connection to S-Bahnhof Ehrenfeld was created, in 1989, and the tunnel to Wolffsohnstraße and surface tracks to Bocklemünd in 1992, where an on-platform transfer to buses can be made.

The Ehrenfeld tunnel has multiple differentiating factors from previously built tunnels: It is the first tunnel built with high-floor platforms, and the stations have their platforms in the middle between the tracks instead of on the side. Because of the experiences with the tunnel below Neusser Straße the station spacing was reduced to get a better service for the residents.

=== Amsterdamer Straße ===

In 1992 as well, the line from Reichensberger Platz to Niehl Sebastianstraße was opened. The line had already been planned in the 1960s which meant that in the early 1970s in addition to a tunnel junction at Reichensbergerplatz, a 300 m (980 ft) long tunnel had been built below an intersection and another rail line. The rest of the line lies on the surface in the middle of Amsterdamer Straße and is mostly built with green track. The platforms are in the middle of the tracks and feature comparatively extensive designs. The last 300 m (980 ft) before the terminus lie next to an elevated 6 lane road. An extension to Niehl Nord, connecting to line 12, would be possible, but is not planned at the time (2022).

=== Mülheim ===

The Mülheim tunnel was opened in June 1997, starts at the Mülheim Bridge, crosses the Wiener Platz with a station, provides a connection to Köln-Mülheim station with direct elevators from the Stadtbahn platform to the mainline rail and ends on the surface in Buchheim. It is the first tunnel in Cologne built using a tunnel boring machine (TBM) under buildings. Construction started in 1992, and 2 years later the TBM had completed the two tunnel sections with a total length of 2.5 km (1.6 mi).

=== Bensberg ===
Line 1 was extended to Bensberg on its east end in 2000: Instead of ending at the previous terminus that was renamed from Bensberg to Im Hoppenkamp, it now enters a nearly 500 m (1,600 ft) long tunnel to the new terminus Bensberg in the center of the quarter. The tunnel was necessary because the terrain's elevation increase is too steep for trains, and the final station lies 14 m (46 ft) below surface.

=== Weiden ===

On 16 July 2002 a part of west end of line 1 discontinued in 1956 was reopened. This produced an uncommon problem: Because the routing passed the past headquarters of RTL, shaking, which could've disrupted the broadcasts, had to be avoided using a complex damping system.

For the 2006 FIFA World Cup the line was extended again to the newly built S-Bahn station Weiden West. At its new terminus, the line meets perpendicularly with the Cologne–Aachen high-speed railway through which S-Bahn lines S 13 and S 19 create new connections especially in a western direction. This part was built to make the RheinEnergieStadion accessible by Stadtbahn from both sides.

At the terminus station a Park and ride facility was built with space for 430 cars, but because other close park and rides are in a different pay zone making the ride to Cologne more expensive, it has seen high usage, and has been extended by 255 more spaces to a total of 685, with more expansions for a total of 1280 spaces planned. A bicycle tower with a capacity for 130 bicycles is also planned, and after it was supposed to be finished by 2022, planning is now expected to end around the start of 2023.

=== Butzweilerhof extension ===
Stations on the extension

The Kölner Verkehrsbetriebe (KVB) opened a 1.85 km (1.15 mi) long extension from the former Ossendorf terminus into the Butzweilerhof/Gewerbegebiet Ossendorf area in December 2010. Three new stations (Alter Flughafen Butzweilerhof, IKEA am Butzweilerhof and the new terminus, Sparkasse Am Butzweilerhof) were added to the existing Line 5. Construction of the extension cost about €18,000,000, with €5 million being financed through a charge on the companies which will benefit from the extension. The remaining €13 million was financed by the KVB Köln (Cologne Transit Authority).

The extension begins near the former Ossendorf terminus (which has been closed), crosses the tracks of the HGK, follows the southern edge of the Hugo-Eckener-Strasse with the 1st station (Alter Flughafen Butzweilerhof) being sited at the corner of Hugo-Eckener-Strasse and Köhlstrasse. It then follows a new street which continues east from Köhlstraße. The line passes the new IKEA am Butzweilerhof store (2nd station), crosses the new extension of Richard-Byrd-Straße, and ends at the intersection of Richard-Byrd-Straße and Von-Hünefeld-Straße.

=== Mengenich ===

For the newly built neighborhood Bocklemünd/Mengenich a connection to the tram network has been planned since the 1960s. This connection was supposed to cross the Militärringstraße on a bridge and the run through a green space to the Autobahn A1 where the line would've ended in a turning loop. This initial planning was first lowered in priority, and later made impossible by an expansion of the Militärringstraße. In 2002, line 3 was expanded to the new terminus Mengenich Ollenhauerring as the first part of a planned expansion to the center of Görling including a tunnel. The planned tunnel was not deemed financeable by NRW and so the city council decided in 2006 that a routing along the surface, that only passed along the edge of the residential area, would be done.

Several variants of the now high priority project along Militärringsstraße to Tollerstraße, Schumacherring or Buschweg were prepared and presented to residents for discussion in 2008. On 6 February 2018 the construction of the new terminus station at Schumacherring began, with it being opened on August 27 of the same year.

=== Brühl double-track ===
In 2015 the city council approved the expansion to double-track the part of line 18 between Brühl-Mitte and Brühl-Badorf. By December 2018, the new tracks had been built, but because a new railway control center and required inspections had delays, the new track could be opened in April 2019. Additional construction such as the upgrade of platforms along the track was finished by mid 2020.

== Current and future expansion ==
=== North-South Stadtbahn ===
The North-South Stadtbahn (NSS) is made up of three stages:

1. Two parallel tunnels from Breslauer Platz to Marktstraße, connecting to the existing Innenstadttunnel
2. A track from Bonner Wall to Schönhauser Straße connecting the route to the Rheinuferbahn
3. 4 more surface stations along Bonner Straße from Marktstraße to Arnoldshöhe

==== Background ====
All 3 stages of the North-South rail

First considerations to connect the north and south of the city center were already undertaken in the 1970s, and actual planning was started by the city in 1983. A direct connection of the north to the south is needed, because part of the Innenstadttunnel is operating at capacity with 30 trains per hour serving it. Because the old tunnel was built using a cut-and-cover technique, it follows major roads distant from the old city center with its narrow alleys. The first stage aims at fixing these problems, by rerouting line 16 from the Innenstadttunnel to the newly built one and building new stations directly under the old city center. Additionally, travel time on line 16 will be decreased by eight minutes and it is one of the last steps in the separation of the high-floor and low-floor networks. The new 3 km (1.9 mi) long tunnel is the first newly built line since the opening of the original downtown tunnel in 1968, while every tunnel opened in between had been a replacement for previous surface lines. It will be used by lines 5, 16 and 17 once complete.

The second stage is only to connect the line to the Rheinuferbahn, necessary for line 16's operation.

The third stage aims to provide a better service for the residents of the Südstadt, Bayenthal, Marienburg and Raderberg by extending line 5, decreasing the travel time from the end of A 555 to the Hauptbahnhof from 30 minutes to just 13.

==== Tunnel collapse and delays ====
On 3 March 2009 the building of the city's archive collapsed into the first stage's tunnel under construction on the Severinstraße between stations Severinstraße and Heumarkt, killing two people. Poor construction, the theft of necessary iron reinforcements and several ground water break-ins into the tunnel, which were not reported or controlled properly by the construction company, are among the alleged causes for this catastrophe.

In 2012, line 5 was re-routed from its previous terminus Reichensbergerplatz to the already finished part of the NSS, now serving Rathaus (city hall) station. A further expansion to Heumarkt opened in December 2013. The 4 stations south of the collapse, Bonner Wall to Severinstraße, and the 2nd stage of the project were opened on 13 December 2015, served by line 17.

The next step of the expansion will be an above ground extension from the Marktstr. Station down Bonner Straße, through Bayenthal. Construction started in January 2022 and should be completed at the end of 2025. Full operation of the North-South Rail Tunnel will not be achieved until 2029 due to the issues of stabilizing the section of tunnel that collapsed in 2009.

==== Cost ====
The extra cost of approximately 400 million euro is planned to mitigate the negative perception of the NSS project due to the collapse as well as budget increases, late completion (originally planned for 2011) and disruption. To avoid the possible destruction of archaeological artefacts underneath one of the oldest cities in Germany, the NSS was bored down to nearly 30 m (98 ft) below ground level. At the location of the future stations, however, archaeological digs were still required and are cited as one of the reasons for the already significant cost overruns. While initially estimated to cost around 600 million euro, the current price tag is calculated at around 960 million euro. The second stage has not been tenderded yet: in this stage, the tunnel will be connected to the line along the Rhine river, and it is expected to cost another 100 million, bringing the total cost to about 1.1 billion euro.

=== StadtBahn South ===
As a 4th stage of the North-South Stadtbahn an extension from Arnoldshöhe to Rondorf and Meschenich was proposed already in 1992. This project has since been renamed to StadtBahn South and is planned independently from the North-South Stadtbahn. The first stage of the project will only reach the northern edge of Meschenich, while a second stage will continue to its southern end. The project will also connect the development area Rondorf Nord-West, where 3300 new homes will be built in the next years, directly to the city center.

The biggest problem of the project is crossing the Verteilerkreisel at the end of the Autobahn A 555 directly after the last station of stage 3, Arnoldshöhe. Here, several different solutions were evaluated:

- A tunnel below the roundabout
- A bridge above it
- Two at grade crossings going around the roundabout

Evaluation showed that all three solutions were possible, with cost-benefit ratios between 1.0 for the tunnel and 1.4 for the at-grade solution, which means that all solutions are possible to be funded partially by the state and federal government. Residents preferred the at-grade solution, while the city pushed the bridge or tunnel. In March of 2023 the city council decided that the preferred solution would be the bridge, but that the at-grade solution would also be continued to be planned. This was due to the lower cost than the tunnel, the disadvantages of at-grade crossings, the about 700 m (770 yd) shorter route, the complete replacement of bus line 132 which currently takes 44 minutes to complete the journey into the city center, the smaller impact on the green spaces and adjacent neighborhood and because this route was intended in the planning of the development area Rondorf Nord-West removing the need to change its plans.

There are three stations planned in Rondorf, called Rondorf Nord, Rondorf Mitte and Rondorf South. The bridge above the roundabout will need to incorporate the red steel-stele that stands in the middle of the roundabout into its design. This stele is part of an artwork by Lutz Fritsch called "Standortmitte" ("middle of the location") that consists of two identical steles at both ends of the A 555 connecting the cities of Cologne and Bonn. To protect a drinking water protection zone the route passes through the adjacent street Am Wasserwerkswäldchen will be closed for through-traffic and a gas station located on the roundabout will also be closed.

In Meschenich Park and Ride facilities are planned on both ends of the town and the Stadtbahn is supposed to operate on the street where traffic will be reduced by a bypass that's already in construction.

The second stage of the project, continuing the line from the northern to the southern end of Meschenich, was also approved and planning was started.

=== East-West axis ===
With line 1 being the 2nd most used line and line 7 and 9 running on the same surface-level tracks in the city center, the rail section at Neumarkt is operating at capacity, while more capacity is needed especially on line 1. To address this growing issue, new 90 m (300 ft) long trains will be used, increasing capacity by 50%. This upgrade needs longer platforms however, for which line 1 has been divided into four parts that need different kinds of upgrades.

==== West ====
This part between Weiden West and Universitätsstraße runs completely on the surface in the middle of Aachener Straße. In this part, platforms and turning loops will have to be upgraded to fit the longer trains. Planning started in 2018, and between August 15 and 4 September 2022, feedback for the plans could be given online. Construction is expected to start in the middle of 2027.

==== City Center ====
This part lies between Moltkestraße and Heumarkt. At stations Moltkestraße and Rudolfplatz its two tracks run separate on one-way streets, and it then runs in the middle of the street until Heumarkt. Because of the demand in this part, both building a tunnel and a major surface-expansion are considered. The stations not rebuilt underground, whether because no tunnel is built or because it is to short to reach them, will be lengthened to accommodate the longer trains as well. Which option to use was to be decided until Q3 of 2023, but has been postponed, possibly until the start of 2024. Planning is anticipated to take until 2026, with construction starting in 2029 at the earliest. When construction will be finished is unclear, as it depends on the chosen option.

Currently the parties of CDU, SPD and FDP are for a tunnel solution, while Bündnis 90/The Greens, The Left and Volt prefer a surface solution. The former group however does not have the majority in the city council as it is missing just a few people.

===== Tunnel-expansion =====
The different tunnel options, all starting at Deutzer Brücke (Deutz Bridge), run to:

1. Neumarkt on lines 1, 7 and 9 ("short tunnel")
2. Rudolfplatz on lines 1, 7 and Dasselstraße/Bf Süd on line 9 ("middle long tunnel")
3. Melaten on lines 1,7 and University on line 9 in separate tunnels ("long tunnel variant A")
4. Melaten on lines 1,7 and University on line 9 with a shared tunnel until Moltkestraße and subsequent routing through the green belt ("long tunnel variant B")

In an open discussion with residents, Stadtbahn users and car users in mid-2018, options 1 and 4 were rejected by everyone, while car users are against a tunnel completely. Stadtbahn users favour no tunnel or option 3, and residents support option 2 more than 3. Originally only options 1 and 2 could have been financed by the state of NRW, while 3 and 4 would have required large expenses of the city, but changes in the funding requirements mean that funding of a tunnel to Melaten is now possible as well.

The tunnel plan presented to the city council in May 2023 is one of the long variants to Melaten. The exact plans are yet to be released to the public, but reports by news agencies state the following:

- Heumarkt station will need only minor changes to make launching the planned tunnel-boring machines possible.
- At Neumarkt station, two new underground levels with two platforms each are planned, one for lines 1 and 7 and one for line 9 remove the at-grade crossing currently present at the surface station. During the construction work the Innenstadttunnel, which was not built to accommodate the new tunnel beneath it, needs to be closed, with the current underground station then functioning as a temporary dead-end station for lines 3, 4 and 18.
- Rudolfplatz station will be the lowest part of the whole tunnel at 35 m (115 ft) below the surface. This is because the Ringe-Tunnel had some provisions for this new tunnel, but those do not adhere to modern standards making them unusable. The large depth is because a safety distance to these needs to be kept, and because a fourth level, probably a mezzanine, will be built.

===== Surface-expansion =====
The plans for the option of a surface expansion were made public in November 2022. The plans aim on using a lot of the space currently given to cars for larger platforms, bicycle lanes or sidewalks. Most of the route only has one motor vehicle lane per direction planned, and bicycles would be given wide paths along the whole route. By default, stations are built with side platforms.

- At Neumarkt, the westbound car lane would be completely removed, only leaving traffic heading to the east, while bicycles would still be able to pass the square in both directions. The plan aims for two island platforms each handling one direction of train traffic. The turning loop is completely removed in the plans. By choosing this option, the square will be integrated much better into the city center as there won't be any traffic separating the two.
- From Rudolfplatz to Moltkestraße, the trains will run on Aachener Straße in both directions, while the motor vehicle traffic will move completely to Richard-Wagner Straße.
- Moltkestraße station will most likely be built between Moltkestraße and Brüsseler Straße, but a different option right below the future S-Bahn station Aachener Straße is also being considered.

==== Tunnel ====
The part between Deutzer Freiheit and Fuldaer Straße is already a tunnel with sufficiently long platforms. In this part accessibility will be improved and fire protection will be upgraded for the increasing amount of passengers.

==== East ====
The part between Höhenberg Frankfurter Straße and Bensberg is overground and will be upgraded to feature longer stations, with the exception of Bensberg which is underground and already features long enough platforms, but will get improved fire protection like the other underground stations. Construction is expected to start in the middle of 2026.

=== Extension of line 17 to Bonn and line 7 to Langel ===
After the Nord-Süd-Stadtbahn is finished, line 17 will run alongside line 16 from Reichenspergerplatz to Sürth with a 5 min headway. The line will be extended to Bonn Hbf east of the Rhine, with the planning split into four parts:

1. Building a new rail and pedestrian bridge across the Rhine, going from Godorf to Langel, and building the station Langel Süd, shared with line 7.
2. New track and two stations in Lülsdorf
3. Upgrading a mostly single-track non-electrified freight railway between Lülsdorf, Niederkassel, Rheidt and Mondorf, including 8 new stations.
4. Building new track along a street between Mondorf/Bergheim and Bonn-Beuel with 4 stations, which connects to the tracks of lines 66 and 67, from where the terminus Bonn Hbf. is then reached.

Alongside this extension, line 7 will also be extended to a new terminus in Langel Süd, connecting to line 17. This is split in two parts:

1. Extension from the terminus Zündorf, then Zündorf Nord to Zündorf Süd with 2 new stations.
2. Extension from Zündorf to Langel, including 3 stations in Langel and the connection to line 17.

The project is planned to be completed in 2030, with the exception of the bridge across the Rhine, which has no estimated completion date as of now.

=== Stepless access to all platforms and trains ===
Because parts of the network were built before accessibility was a concern, many older stations don't feature elevators/ramps to get from street level to the platform without steps. Also, because the network started as a tram, was then partially operated with high-floor Stadtbahn vehicles, and then split into a high-floor (HF) and low-floor (LF) network, some platforms still don't feature level boarding, requiring the users to climb a few steps to enter the train. Seven of these stations can't be upgraded, because they're served by both HF and LF vehicles, while others could, but just haven't been upgraded yet. The LF lines feature level boarding everywhere, as they're compatible with old tram platforms, but parts at both ends of the trains are not accessible. Also a few LF platforms can't be reached without climbing steps, a notable example being the highly used station Friesenplatz. Equipping the HF lines with matching platforms could only be started in 2003, as until then large parts of the network were served by HF and LF lines. First the city center tunnel was converted step-by-step, and in 2010 lines 3 and 4 became the first to be fully accessible. Since then the missing platforms are concentrated on the lines 13 and 16, with a few missing on the other HF lines. Out of the 352 stations, 32 are not accessible, 12 have limited accessibility and 308 are fully accessible.

Line	1	3	4	5	7	9	12	13	15	16	17	18	Total
Stations	37	31	29	17	33	24	27	23	23	50	8	50	352
with HF platforms	–	31	29	14	–	–	–	9	–	40	8	47	178
with LF platforms	37	–	–	3 (Note: Appellhofplatz/Zeughaus, Subbelrather Str./Gürtel, Nußbaumerstr.)	33	24	27	14 (Note: Berrenrather Str./Gürtel, Euskirchener Str., Zülpicher Str./Gürtel, Gleueler Str./Gürtel, Dürener Str./Gürtel, Wüllnerstr., Aachener Str./Gürtel, Melatengürtel, Weinsbergstr./Gürtel, Subbelrather Str./Gürtel, Nußbaumerstr., Escher Str., Geldernstr./Parkgürtel, Slabystr.)	23	10 (Note: Reichenspergerplatz, Barbarossaplatz, Eifelstr., Ulrepforte, Chlodwigplatz, Ubierring, Urfeld, Widdig, Uedorf, Hersel)	–	3 (Note: Slabystr., Reichenspergerplatz, Barbarossaplatz)	174

=== Longer trains and platforms ===
Because of the increasing demand throughout the system that can no longer be met by increasing frequency in some parts of the system, lines 1, 4, 9, 13 and 18 will be operated by longer trains in the future. Line 1 and possibly line 9 will have their platforms lengthened to 90 m (300 ft) as part of the east–west rail project, and will then be operated by 90 m (300 ft) long trains. Lines 4, 13 and 18 will have in total 39 platforms upgraded to accommodate new 70 m (230 ft) long trains and add sufficient fire protection for the increasing number of passengers in underground stations.

=== Other plans ===
All of these plans have been brought up by a political party, and some are in different planning stages currently.

Line	Expansion
1	Extension from Bergisch Gladbach-Bensberg from further east Bergisch Gladbach-Moitzfeld to Gladbach-Herkenrath Kürten-Spitze.
4	Connection of the district Widdersdorf from Mengenich. The city initially preferred a variant using line 1 due to lower costs and better service for residents, but it was decided that line 4 should be used. A later continuation to Niederaußem is also considered.
4	An extension from Schlebusch station to a clinic inside Schlebusch or even to the city of Odenthal is in discussion, but the existing line would have to be double-tracked first.
5	Extension from Butzweilerhof to Longerich, where it could connect to the S-Bahn Rhein-Ruhr and / or line 15.
7	Extension to the new development area Grube Carl in Frechen and possibly further to Frechen-Habbelrath. An extension to Kerpen is also already in discussion.
13	Extension from Sülzgürtel to the Rhine following the cologne belt. Currently, both a surface and underground track are considered.
13	Extension from Mülheim to Ostheim and later to the S-Bahnhof Frankfurter Straße or completing the ring including a new crossing of the Rhine.
13	10 stations from Berrenrather Straße/Gürtel to Venloer Straße/Gürtel will be upgraded with high-floor platforms, and some will be lengthened.
13	Construction of two additional stations at Niehler Straße and Bolternstraße. Both will be elevated and equipped with side-platforms suitable for 70 m (230 ft) long trains.
14	Construction of a new circumferential low-floor line that runs from the university on Universitätsstraße, Weißhausstraße and through Raderberg and Bayenthal before reaching the Rhine. The line could then be extended north to Ehrenfeld on Universitätsstraße/Innere Kanalstraße, and in the south it could run over a new bridge across the Rhine connecting with line 7.
15 12	Extension of the tunnel on the Neusser Straße from Mollwitzstraße to Wilhelm-Sollmann-Straße, as originally planned when the tunnel was built.
18 3	Extension from Thielenbruch to the city center of Bergisch Gladbach through the closed down Paper Fabric Zanders, which will restore a connection that had been present until 1958.
18	Building a short tunnel below Militärringstraße to enable trains to cross the intersection every 5 minutes which is needed for the extension to Hürth-Center.
18	Extending the city center tunnel ending at Barbarossaplatz to the green belt, while building a new station at Bf Süd. Concstruction can only be started, when line 16 has moved into the new North-South-Tunnel.
18	Double-tracking the whole line to enable 10 minute headways from Cologne to Bonn on this route. Funding was approved in May 2023 and planning work started afterwards.
19 18	Stichstrecke from Hürth-Hermülheim to Hürth-Center as part of line 18's service, this new service will probably operate as line 19.
?	Construction of a new railway line from Deutz to Flittard and the headquarters and route over the planned district of Mülheim-Süd; A further connection to Leverkusen (- Wiesdorf) or even to (- Opladen) is discussed.

== Rolling stock ==
Since the last traditional tramcars were retired in 2006, the Stadtbahn's active rolling stock consists exclusively of modern articulated light rail vehicles. All of them are about 30 m (98 ft 5 in) long, 2.65 m (8 ft 8 in) wide, seat approximately 70 passengers and are approved for speeds of up to 80 km/h (50 mph). With rare exceptions, all services are operated by two units coupled together.

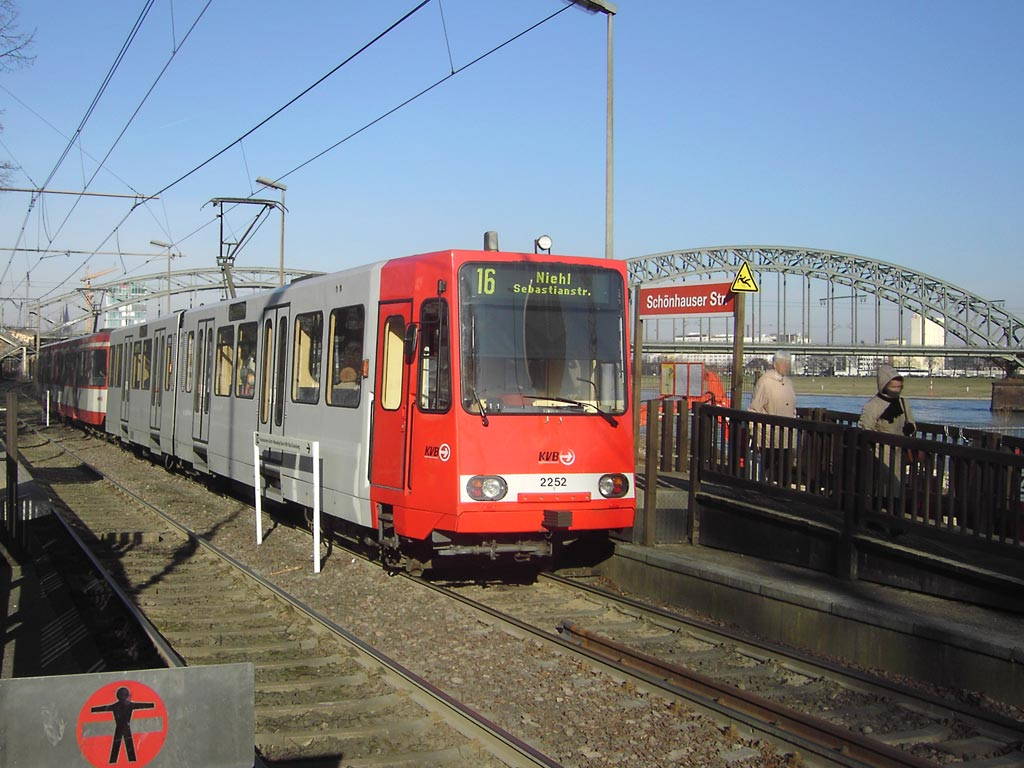
Third-generation Type B LRV in new livery on line 16

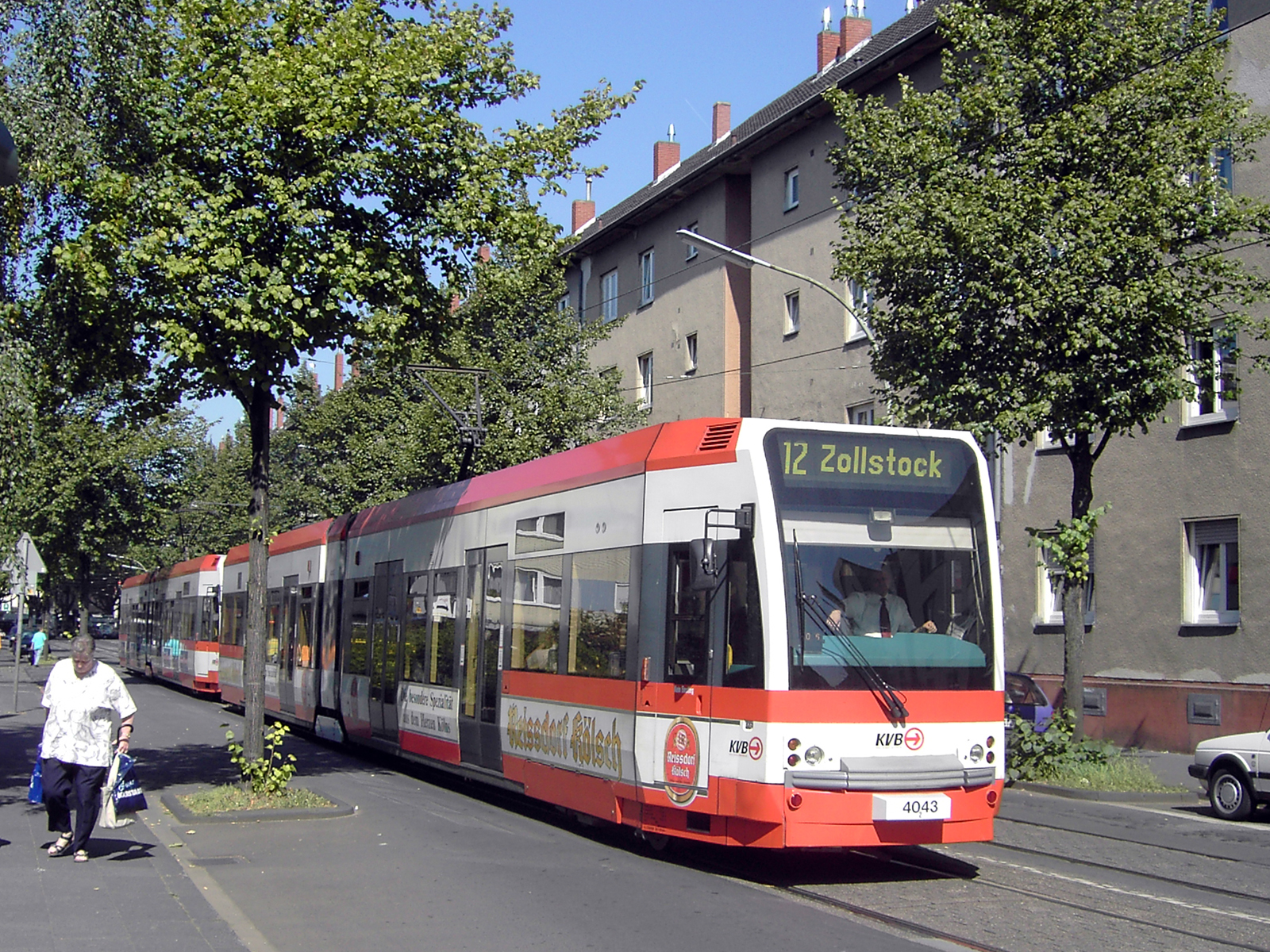
A K4000 low-floor tram in old livery on line 12

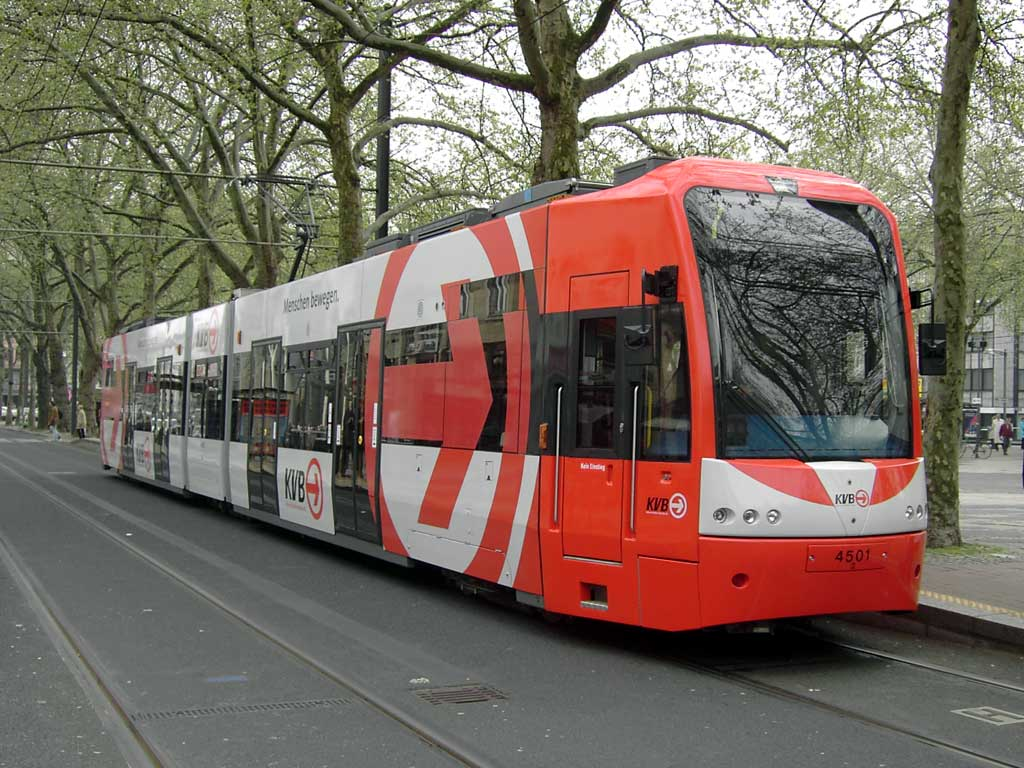
A newer K4500 tram at its presentation on 18 April 2005

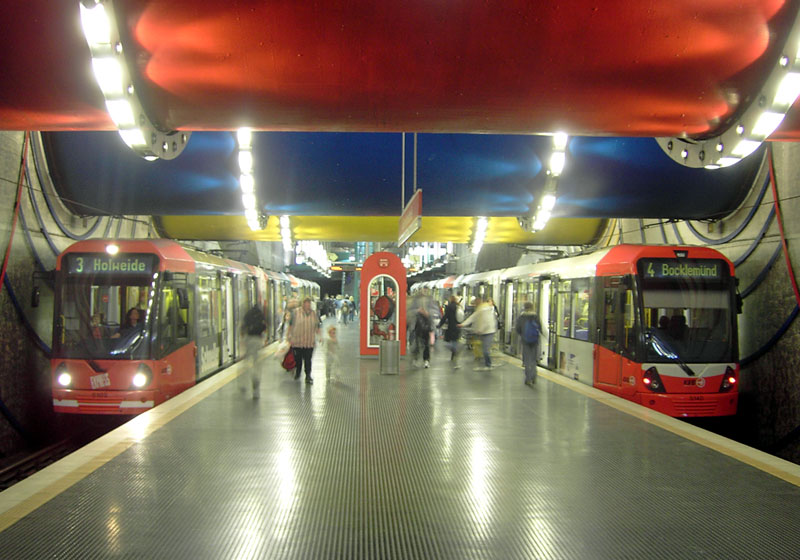
Two K5000 high-floor trams on lines 3 (left) and 4 (right)

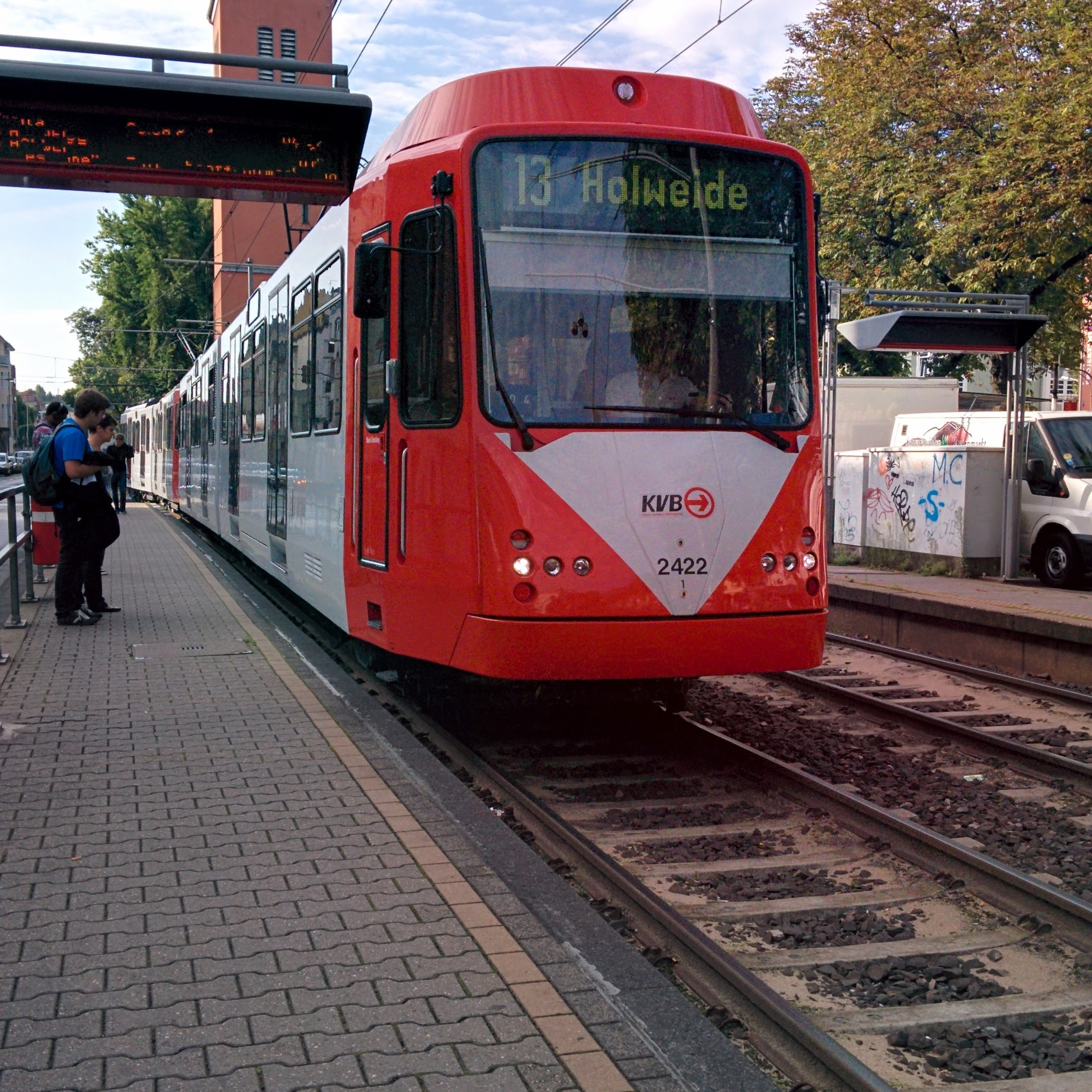
Refurbished train 2422 at Gleueler Str./Gürtel

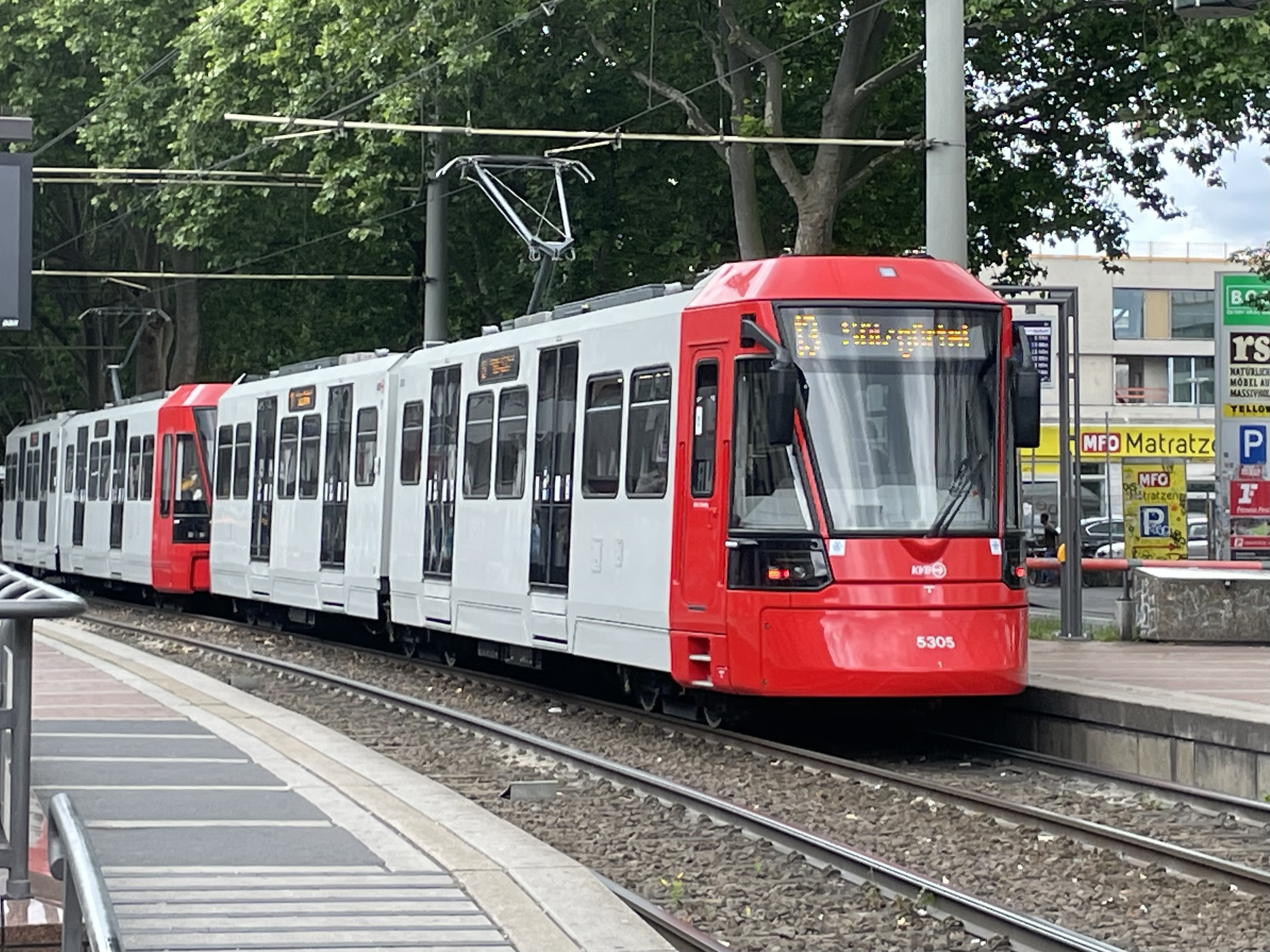
A HF6 train at station Venloer Straße/Gürtel on line 13

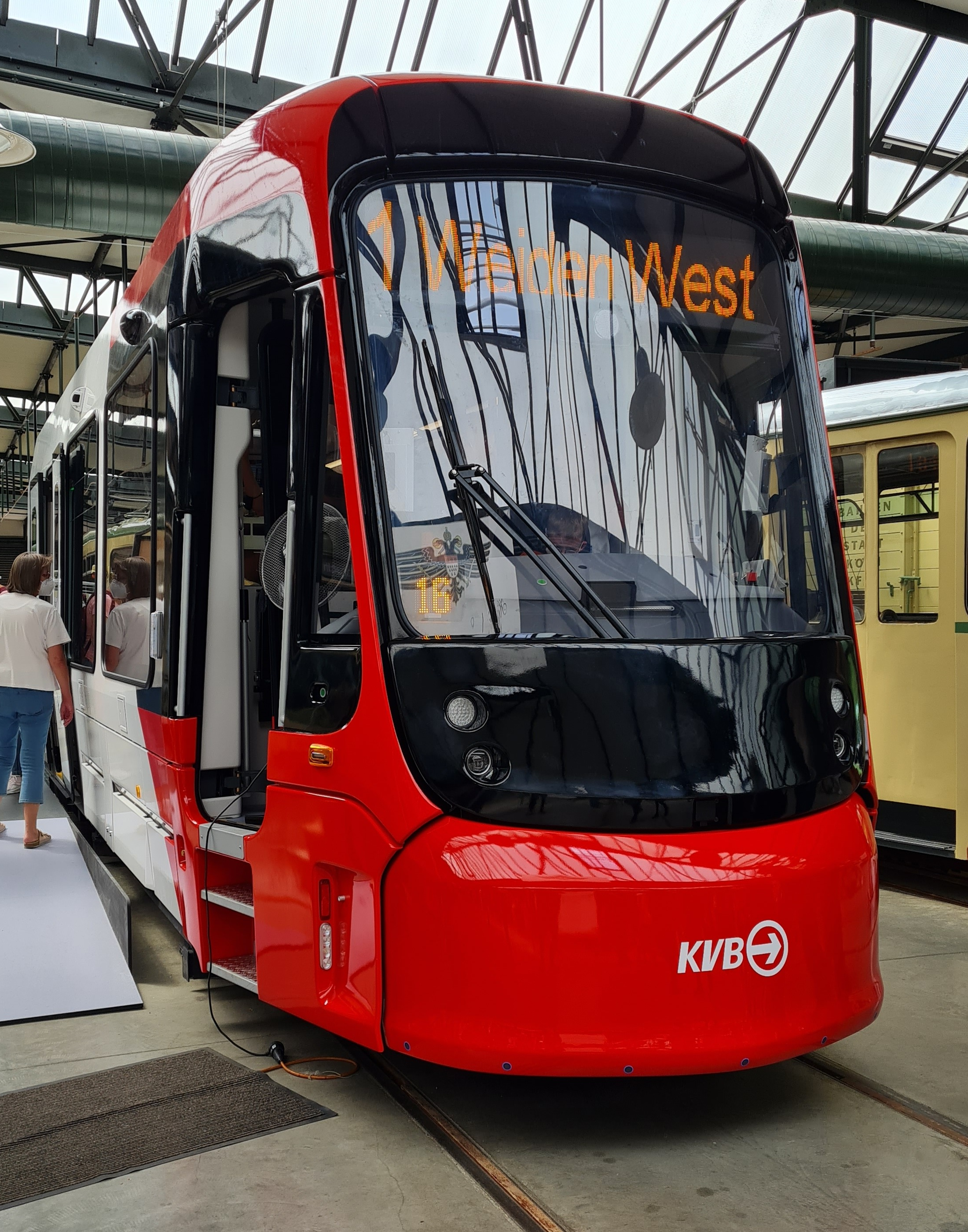
A mockup of the NF12 and NF6 trains that will start operating in a few years

=== Stadtbahnwagen B ===
In 1973, Cologne received two prototypes of the Duewag Stadtbahnwagen B LRV. Since then, 172 units in four batches were delivered to Cologne until 1996. The first series (2000) was retired until 2023. Four units (2031, 2032, 2035 and 2049) are still kept by the KVB for training purposes, the other units were either scrapped, sold to Istanbul Tram, or in the case of unit 2012, donated to the Straßenbahn-Museum Thielenbruch.

On 8 October 2022, a series 2300 Stadtbahnwagen Typ B caught on fire in the underground station Ebertplatz. The cause was determined to be a technical failure by a component beneath the steps, and later narrowed down to an overheated power converter responsible for the breaks. The KVB then temporarily stopped operating the 33 (one source says 32) trains of the series on 27 October 2022, and started operating lines 3, 5 and 13 with single, 30 m (98 ft) long, trains, which lead to overcrowding. The manufacturer of the component, ABB, supplied a software update to KVB, which was approved by the technical authority on 10 November, and the operation of the trains resumed on 11 November 2022, the start of carnival season in Cologne.

=== Low-floor LRVs (K4000 and K4500) ===
After tests with a low-floor tram from Vienna, a similar vehicle was developed for Cologne by Bombardier Transportation, later becoming part of Bombardier's standardized Bombardier Flexity Swift family. A total of 124 low-floor trams were delivered between 1995 and 1998, referred to as "K4000", with these vehicles receiving numbers starting with 4001. The Bombardier CR4000 trams operating on Tramlink in Croydon, England are largely based on the K4000 stock used in Cologne.

When it was decided to create a second low-floor network, an option for high-floor vehicles was changed to additional low-floor vehicles. Bombardier developed a new low-floor tram based more on the K5000 (see below) than on the K4000. These new trams were named K4500. Delivery of 69 units started in 2005 and was completed in late 2007.

=== CitySprinter ===
By the time a new series of high-floor vehicles was needed, Duewag had been sold to Siemens Transportation Systems and later dissolved, meaning that additional Type B cars were no longer being made. Siemens subsequently proposed the "CitySprinter", a high-floor derivative of its Combino series of low-floor city trams.

In August 1999, after two months of testing, the first CitySprinter prototype crashed into another tram at 50 km/h (30 mph) at the Christophstraße/MediaPark U-Bahn station. The accident was caused by a simultaneous electronics shutdown resulting in the train's inability to apply its brakes. Eight people sustained serious injuries. A second prototype was produced but as a result of the crash was never delivered.

=== High-floor LRVs (K5000 and K5200) ===
Following the failure of the CitySprinter, Bombardier derived a high-floor tram from the K4000. 59 units, named K5000, were delivered in 2002 and 2003. The numbering was changed to 5101 at short notice to avoid re-using the number 5001, which had been the number of the ill-fated CitySprinter. Another 15 vehicles of the same design, named K5200, were delivered before 2011.

The Bombardier M5000 trams used on the Manchester Metrolink, England are almost identical to the K5000/K5200 series used in Cologne.

=== Refurbished Stadtbahnwagen B series 2100 (now 2400) ===
Starting in 2011, the KVB and Bonn Stadtbahn converted their old series 2100 Stadtbahnwagen B to new, modern trains now classified as series 2400. In this conversion the brake system, seats, air conditioning and the vehicle's body were completely upgraded, and the second cockpit was removed. The type got its EBO certification in 2016, and since then the trains can operate in the whole HF network for another 30 years. The last of the 28 vehicle was certified in April 2021.

According to the KVB, upgrading the old trains for 49 million Euro saved about 40.6 million € over buying new vehicles. Additionally, the engineers servicing the trains already know every part of the trains, knowledge that first has to be gathered with new trains. The project was the first of its kind, with a local rail operator renovating their trains. The project was only possible, because of the high quality materials used in the original 2100 trains.

=== Flexity Swift HF6 ===
Together with the Düsseldorf Rheinbahn, the KVB ordered 79 trains of the type Bombardier Flexity Swift in 2015, 59 of which were intended for Düsseldorf and 20 for Cologne. Since then, the KVB converted 7 options to orders. The first of the 27 trains arrived in December 2020, and after undergoing extensive testing they started normal passenger operation about one year later. The last trains are expected to arrive in Cologne in early 2023. The new trains are capable of achieving 80 km/h (50 mph), are 28 m (92 ft) long, about the same length as the other trains, and include 64 seats. They are designated as series 5300.

=== Low-floor NF12/NF6 ===
In 2020, a contract for 62 new 60 m (200 ft) long NF12s and 2 half as long NF6s was given to Alstom and Kiepe Electric, including options for up to 11 additional NF12s and 25 additional NF6s. Delivery and testing of 2 long and 2 short trains is planned to start in July 2024, with passenger service starting a year later. The new trains are supposed to completely replace the 124 existing K4000 LRVs.

The trains feature many new things previously not seen in the system. Currently all trains are composed of two 30 m units, resulting in wasted space and a safety hazard where the trains are coupled together, while the new NF12's will fully use the whole length of the trains and feature a fifth set of doors in the middle. The trains will also be equipped with a collision warning system that can detect objects up to 80 m (260 ft) in front of the train, issuing a warning to the driver depending on the speed of the train. The trains will feature more efficient air conditioning than previous ones, better passenger information screens and sensors that enable preventive maintenance.

For the first time in the system's history, in 2021 a design mockup was constructed at tram museum Thielenbruch used to get feedback on accessibility and the layout of the driver's cab. In 2022, another mockup was put on public display at the museum, but was criticized, because the trains feature a 5 cm (2.0 in) "step" followed by a 6% steep ramp at the doors which is to steep to comfortably climb in a wheelchair. According to the KVB the situation on the actual trains will be better than on the mockup as the gap in between platform and train was larger than in normal operation. The internal layout of the trains can't be changed retroactively and the option of ordering new trains was discarded as well, as the trains do adhere to accessibility standards. Other measures to increase accessibility like a strap at the door, additional training for the train drivers or electric ramps are in discussion.

=== Stadler LRVs ===
In 2025, a contract for 132 new vehicles was given to Stadler Rail. The longest version will be up to 70 m (230 ft) long, including options for intermediate modules, each 10 m (33 ft) long.

=== Train interiors ===
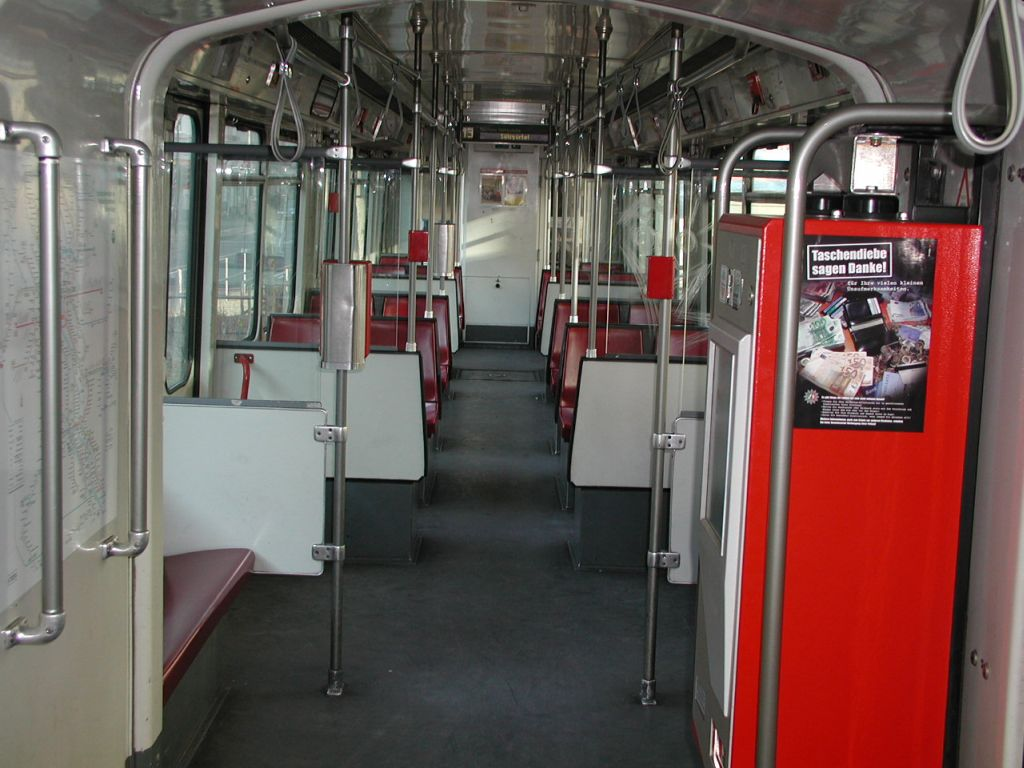
B100S 2000

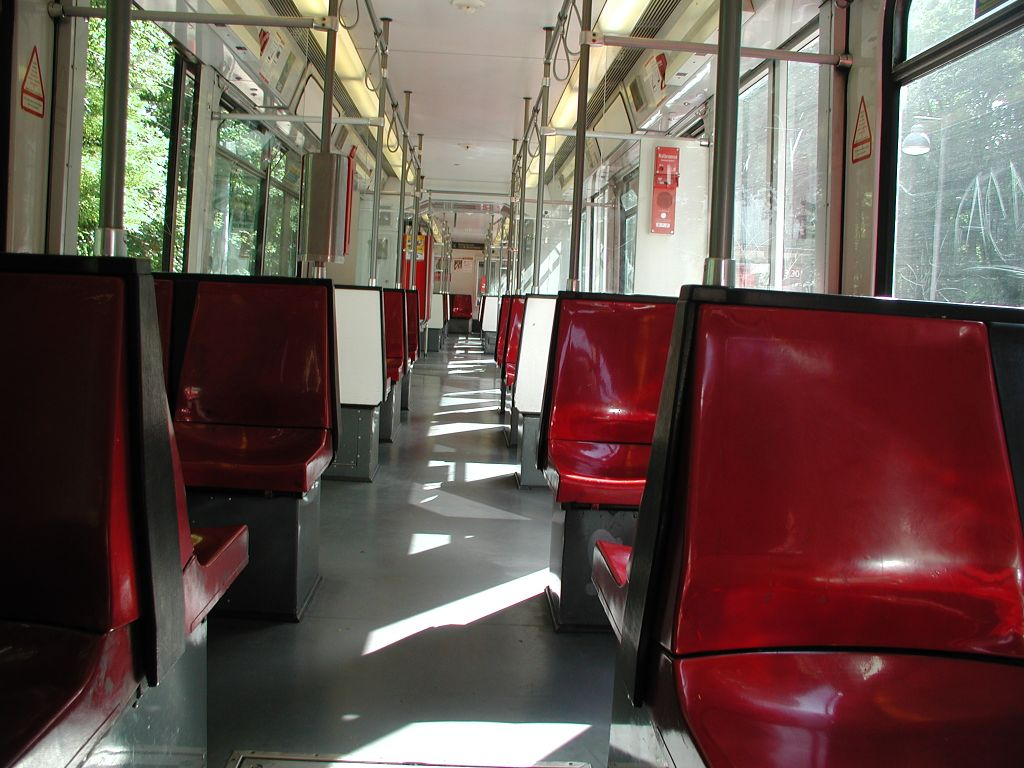
B100S 2100

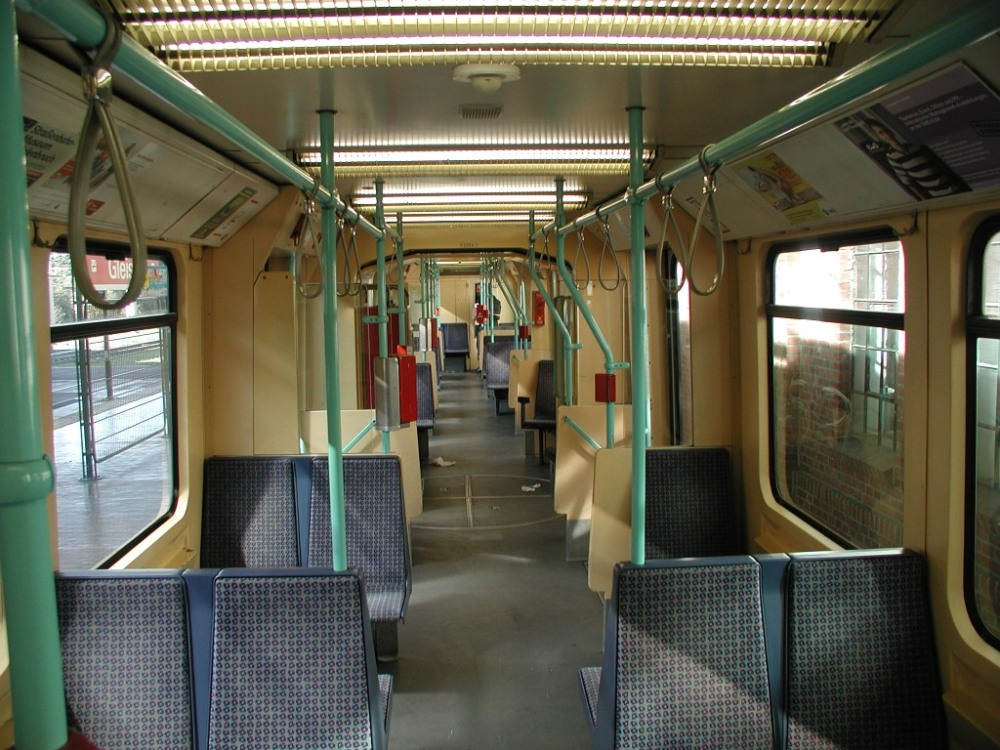
B80D 2200

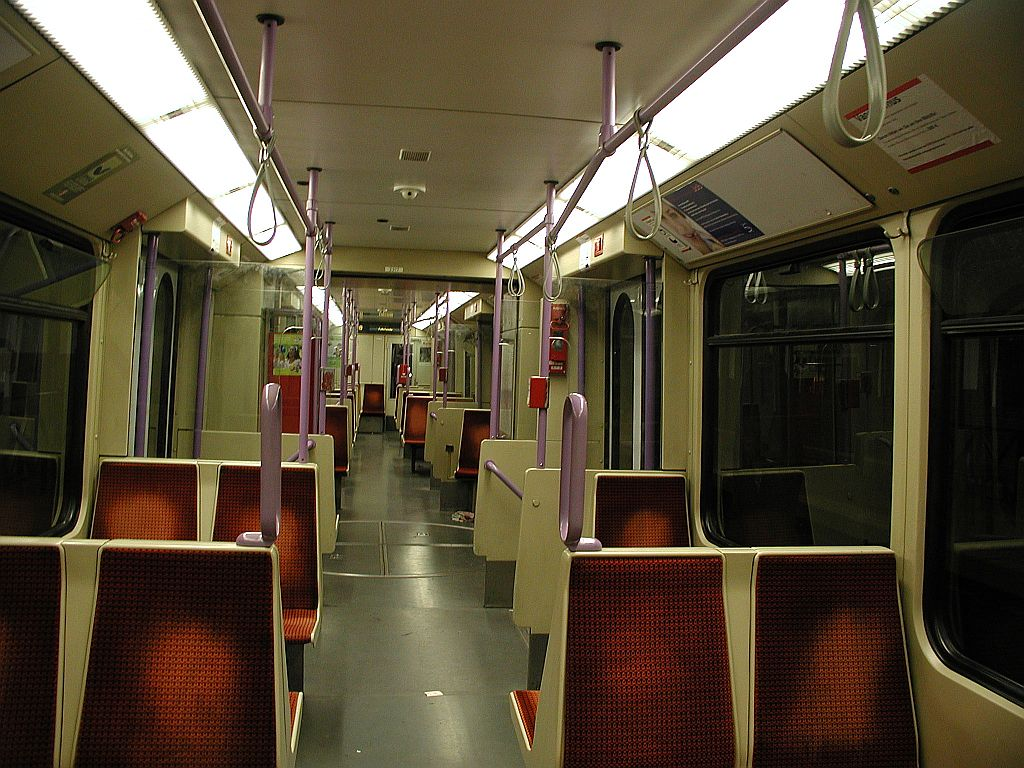
B80D 2300

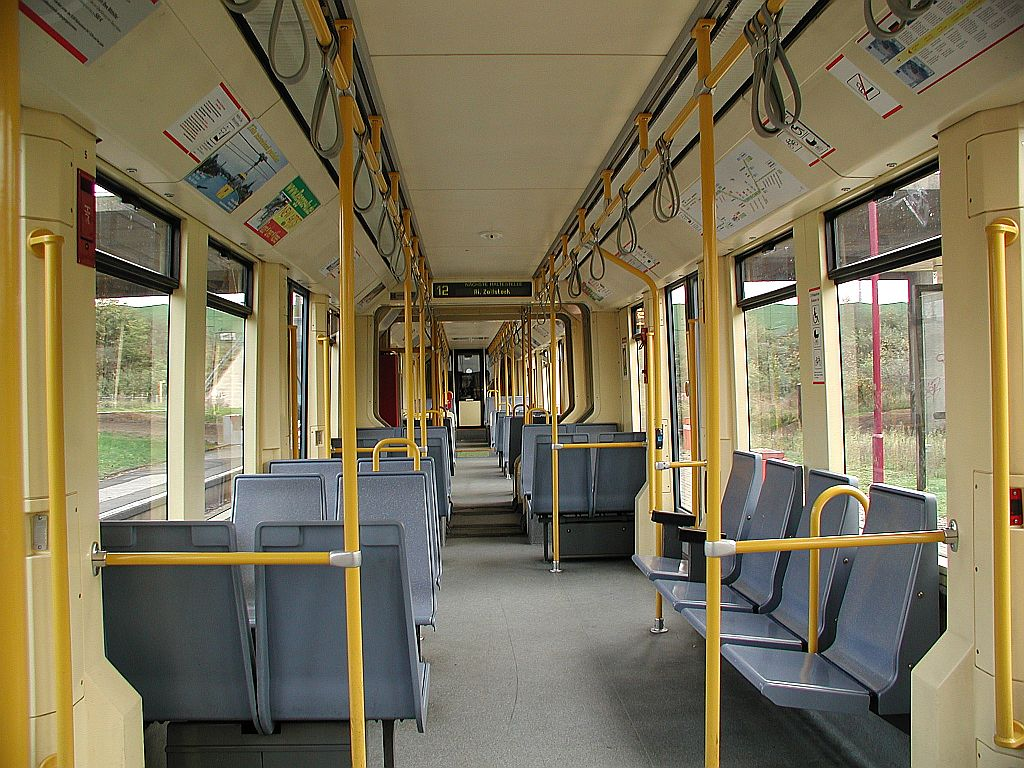
K4000

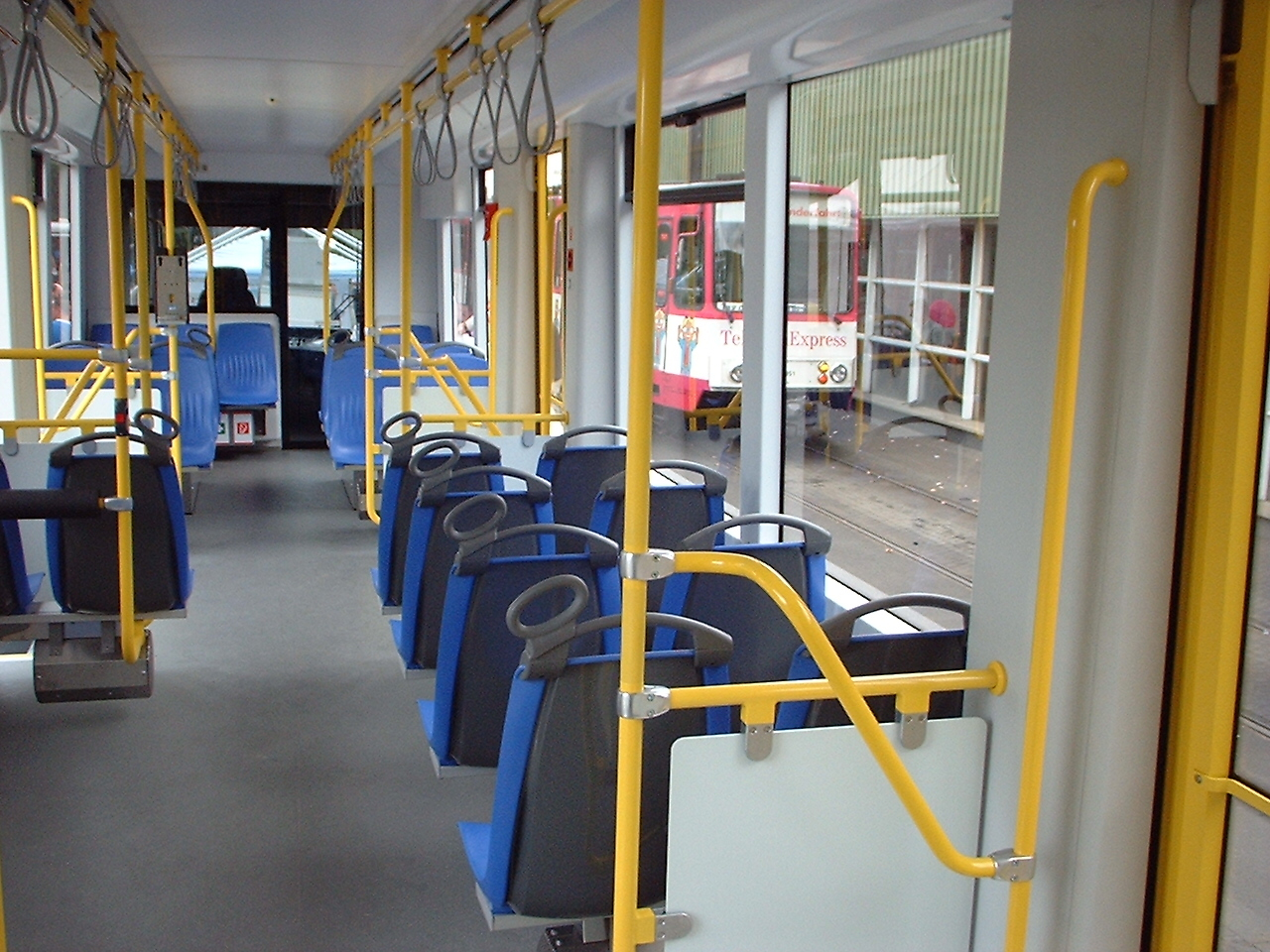
K5000

== Depots and workshops ("Betriebshöfe") ==
The KVB has 4 large depots and workshops, as well as a few smaller parking facilities. Historically there were 17 more depots and workshops, that have since been relocated or abandoned.

=== Current depots, workshops and parking facilities ===
==== Wesseling ====
The depot and workshop in Wesseling was first constructed by the KBE in 1906. It's the smallest one, with space for just 50 trains and 30 employees, and mainly serves the trains for lines 16, 17 and 18. It's the only depot outside of Cologne, and sometimes the old Querbahn is used to connect it to line 18. It was transferred to the KVB, when the KBE closed in 1986.

==== Main workshop and depot in Weidenpesch ====
The current main workshop ("Hauptwerkstatt", HW) of the KVB was opened in 1923, when the former HW moved from Rhieler Straße to Weidenpesch. Most heavy maintenance as well as the conversion of the series 2100 to series 2400 are done here.

In 2021 a new modern depot opened next to the HW, with space for 64 trains and facilities to restock sand and wash the trains, and a water collection system for the washing, as well as solar panels on the roof. Along with the new depot building, new track to connect the HW and depot to Neusser Straße were constructed, reducing operating noise especially during the night.

==== West ====
The depot at Scheidweilerstr. exists since 1924 when the old depot, that stood where the Aachener Weiher now is, was destroyed. After World War 2, the depot was almost completely destroyed and for the time, depots Sülz and Ost were used. In 1961 to 1964 the depot as it now is was built. The depot is known as the heart of the KVB, because the control room is situated there, as well as customer service and management. In total, about 1200 employees work at the depot and the surrounding offices. The depot has space for 60 of the trains used on lines 1, 5, 7 and 13. In 2004 and 2005, the management building was renovated and 2 new buildings were built, and in 2021 the old tracks from the 1960s were replaced. The control room is one of the most modern ones in Europe since its renovation in 2014.

==== Merheim ====
The depot in Merheim, that opened in 1994, is the biggest and most modern, with space for 140 trains in an area of about 8,000 m^{2} (9,600 sq yd), and 120 employees working there. After its opening the former depots East and Thielenbruch were closed. Nearly all trains, especially on lines 3 and 4, are stored and serviced here.

==== Stadium ====
The parking facility at the RheinEnergieStadion was built along with the sport facilities in 1923 with 8 tracks, and has since been modernized several times. It's mainly used to provide trains to visitors of sport events and some trains only used during peak hours.

==== Porz ====
Just behind Porz Markt station there are two tracks were the trains running to the university in the morning are parked.

==== Zündorf ====
At the south end of line 7 there's a single track for parking created in 2000. It's necessary because going there from Betriebshof West or Merheim is time-consuming and complicated, the parking facility in Porz is to small and former depots in Deutz and Porz were closed.

==== Deutz ====
The quad-tracked underground parking facility Deutz is just east of Bahnhof Deutz/Messe station, and was created together with the tunnel in 1983. The plans to rebuild Merheim and close Betriebshof Deutz were concrete enough already, that this parking facility was deemed necessary.

==== Merkenich ====
Only in 2005 a parking facility was created at the terminus of line 12 in Merkenich for trains of lines 12 and 15, because of the long time required to get there from other depots. It was built double-tracked with space for six trains per track, and was extended in 2013 with a third track, but the first track is now used to turn the trains around, while only the 2nd and 3rd are used for parking. The trains of line 15 parking here depart as line 15 in the morning, but serve line 12's route until Wilhelm-Sollman Straße, where lines 12 and 15 join. These additional services on line 12's route are not explicitly mentioned on timetables.

=== Former depots ===
==== Maximinenstraße ====
In Maximinenstraße there were two depots: Starting 1877 it was the main depot, workshop and office of the first horsecar system, but an expansion of the Centralbahnhof forced it to close in 1886. In 1888 another depot was built in Maximinenstraße, that was closed in 1902 because it was deemed to small in the electrification of the system.

==== Kalk ====
The depot in Kalk was also opened in 1877, housing the horses and wagons of the horsecar between Deutz and Kalk, which both didn't formally belong to Cologne at that point. When the much larger Ost-Bahnhof in Deutz was opened in 1902, the depot was closed.

==== Nippes ====
The depot in Nippes served the horsecar lines to Nippes and Sechzig, but had to be closed in 1903 because it was to small for the electrification.

==== West ====
The former Betriebshof West was built in 1877 for services to Melaten and Lindenthal, and upgraded in 1902 for use with electric vehicles. The old depot was located at the junction of Dürener Straße/(Innere) Kanalstraße and was torn down when the Aachener Weiher was constructed in 1923. Only a year later the current Betriebshof West in Scheidtweiler Straße was opened, keeping the wooden halls from the old site which later burnt down due to bombing during World War 2.

==== Ehrenfeld ====
The depot in Gutenbergstraße was also constructed in 1877 for the service to Ehrenfeld, and was one of the few that had enough space to be upgraded in the electrification in 1901. During World War 2 it was damaged so badly, that it was closed in 1944.

==== Süd (South) ====
The last depot opened in 1877 was located at Koblenzer Straße in Bayenthal, where it first housed horsecars and later electric trams. The depot was modernized regularly to keep up with new vehicle technologies, but starting in the 1950s the increasingly larger vehicles were parked and serviced in depots West and Ost more and more, until the depot sharply reduced train operation in 1967, serving only for some parking during the night. A few years later the depot was only used for buses until it closed entirely in 1996.

==== Mülheim ====
In 1889 a depot was built in Kranenstraße, but was to small for the electrification in 1902, and closed. The original building still exists today.

==== Rodenkirchen ====
Rodenkirchen saw the smallest depot of the KVB ever from 1883 to 1902. The just 600 m^{2} (720 sq yd) big area had space for just four wagons and nine horses, as well as beds for the personnel, but it was probably only used by one horsecar at a time.

==== Weißbüttengasse ====
Located in Altstadt-Süd, the depot was opened in 1885. The building had a two-story hall, with offices on the second floor for the management, which moved there after Maximinenstraße was closed. Due to space constraints, only trains of line 18 were parked there when the depot closed in 1933. The offices were still used until 1943 when the building was destroyed in World War 2.

==== Nord (North) ====
In 1888 the depot at Rhieler Straße, opposite to the zoo, was opened, and in 1901 it was electrified and got an access from the Rhine's shore, but it housed the last horsecars until 1907. The workshop was closed in 1923 and moved to Merheim (now Weidenpesch). Starting 1950 only buses were parked here, and in 1956 the depot was closed.

==== Ost (East) ====
The depot was opened in 1902 for electric trams at Deutz-Kalker Straße in Deutz, and until its closure in 1994, when the depot in Merheim made it obsolete, the depot was modernized countless times. Today the space is used by the Kölner Haie.

==== Merheim left-rhenish (Weidenpesch) ====
The old depot in Weidenpesch, which was called Merheim until 1952, was opened in 1902 in Jesuitengasse, and closed in 1969.

==== Thielenbruch ====
The depot in Thielenbruch was opened in 1902 to serve the Vorortbahn C, later G, to Bergisch Gladbach. In 1926 the depot was expanded with a second hall, and is under preservation since 1985. It was one of few depots that weren't damaged badly during World War 2, and was closed in 1994 because the new depot Merheim opened and expansion was difficult due to the preservation. The history of the depot doesn't end here though, as one hall was converted to the terminus of (now) lines 3 and 18, and in 1997 a museum opened in the other hall where the historical horsecars, trams and trains of the system are shown.

==== Porz ====
The depot in Porz was opened in 1909 where now Porz Markt station is located, but the area was limited by Goethestraße in the east and rail tracks in the West. In 1973 train operations were stopped, and in 1975 it was closed.

==== Bensberg ====
In 1913 a depot was opened at the former terminus Bensberg, that's now called Im Hoppenkamp. Starting 1945 no trains spent their time here, and in 1961 the hall that once had 4 tracks of which one had remained, was destroyed and replaced by 3 outdoor tracks. This new parking space was not needed technically, but it was built anyways to attract potential new personnel from Bergisch Gladbach by providing a close by depot. It was closed in 1967. In this place the tunnel to the current terminus Bensberg was started in 1996.

==== Mülheim ====
The second depot in Mülheim was opened in 1913 by the Mülheimer Kleinbahnen, because Mülheim only became part of Cologne the next year. After the city took over the Mülheimer Kleinbahnen in 1933, the depot was mainly used for the Vorortbahn O. Between 1936 and 1941 the depot was closed and used as storage, and after that it was reopened to be a reserve in case Betriebshof Ost would become inoperable by bombing. In 1958 the depot became unnecessary and was closed.

==== Sülz ====
In 1927 a depot was opened at Hermeskeiler Platz where now the terminus of line 9 is located, and for a short time it was the largest Betriebshof on European mainland. In World War 2 large parts of it were destroyed, and afterwards two previous tracks were used for trolleybuses that were tested in the 1950s. Because of its location in a residential area, there was no space for expansion and residents often complained about the noise. Due to these problems, the depot was closed in 1986.

== Technology ==
Like most German Stadtbahn systems, standard-gauge and overhead line are used. The wires are supplied with 800 V DC, and the trains are made for 750 V DC. Due to the beginning of the system as a tram, the tracks feature small curve radiuses of down to 25 m (82 ft); other systems like the Stuttgart Stadtbahn use radiuses of at least 50 m (160 ft). The trains use the maximum legal width of vehicles on streets of 2.65 m (8.7 ft). In most trains there are groups of 4 seats, but the newer K4500 and K5000 use some row-seating. The platform height is 35 cm (14 in) (low-floor network) and 90 cm (35 in) (high-floor network) above the rails. All platforms are built for a 54 m (177 ft) long double-units, with the smallest platforms being 50 m (160 ft) long requiring an exact stop. The longest platforms are on the underground station Fuldaer Straße, which is 110 m (360 ft) long.

=== Signalling and train protection ===
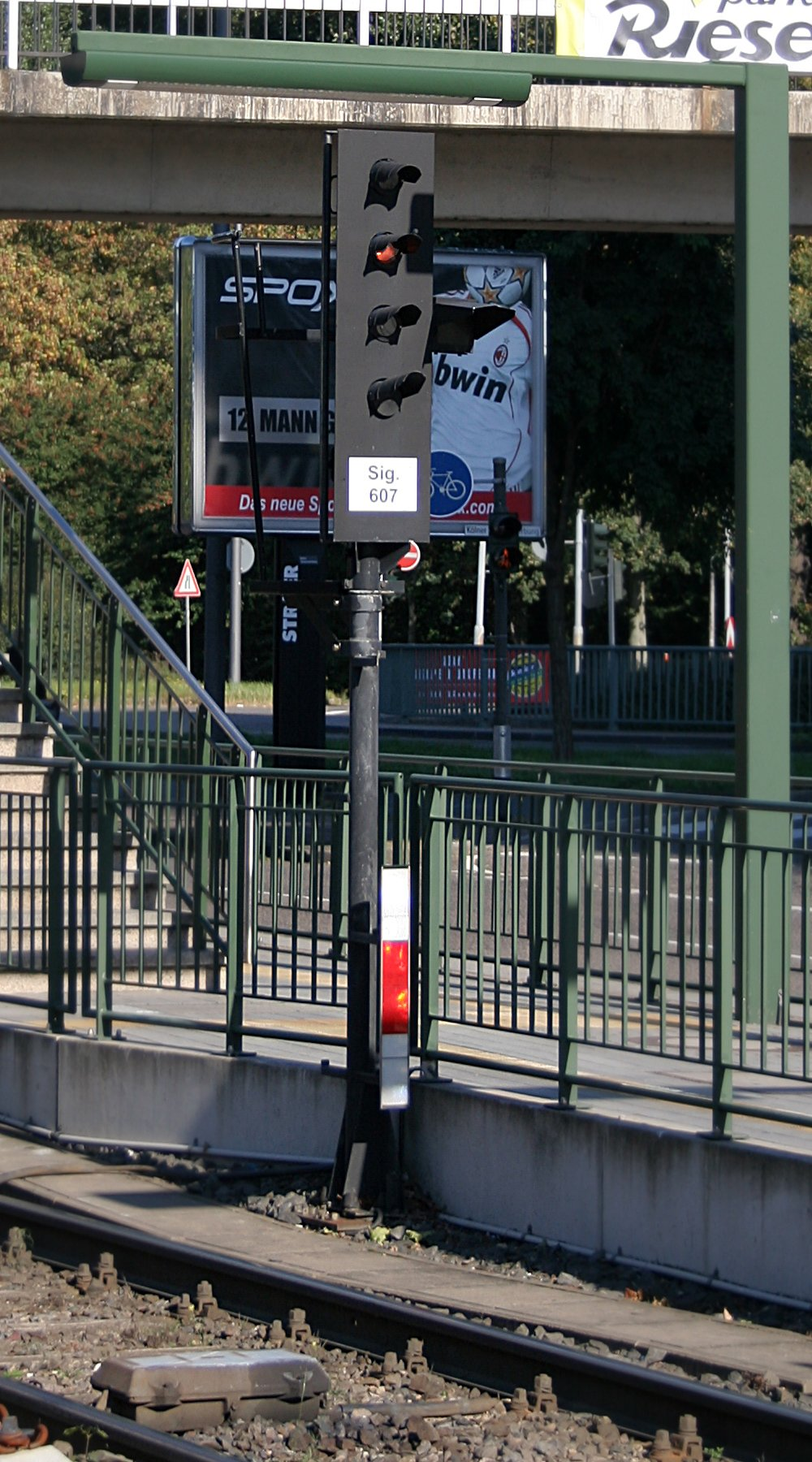
A signal showing yellow and the train stop below

On most surface tracks, line-of-sight operation is used. The surface signals can indicate one of three things, though not all signals have all indications installed.

- Horizontal bar: Stop
- Vertical bar: Proceed straight ahead
- Diagonal bar: Proceed to the right/left

In the tunnels, on the elevated track and on some surface right-of-ways, signalling and train protection are used. On KVB tracks the maximum speed is 70 km/h (43 mph) even with these installed, while on HGK tracks up to 100 km/h (62 mph) are allowed, but never achieved because the trains only allow up to 80 km/h (50 mph). The signals have three indications:

- Green: Proceed
- Yellow: Expect stop at next signal
- Red: Stop

In the city center tunnel, sometimes the yellow signal is used together with speed signal "2", allowing entering a partially blocked segment with up to 20 km/h (12 mph) to allow smaller distances between trains.

On all lines there is a kind of PZB in use, where the inductors are located between the tracks instead of next to them like standard PZB. On the HGK lines, additional PZB equipment for freight trains is installed.

=== Passenger information ===
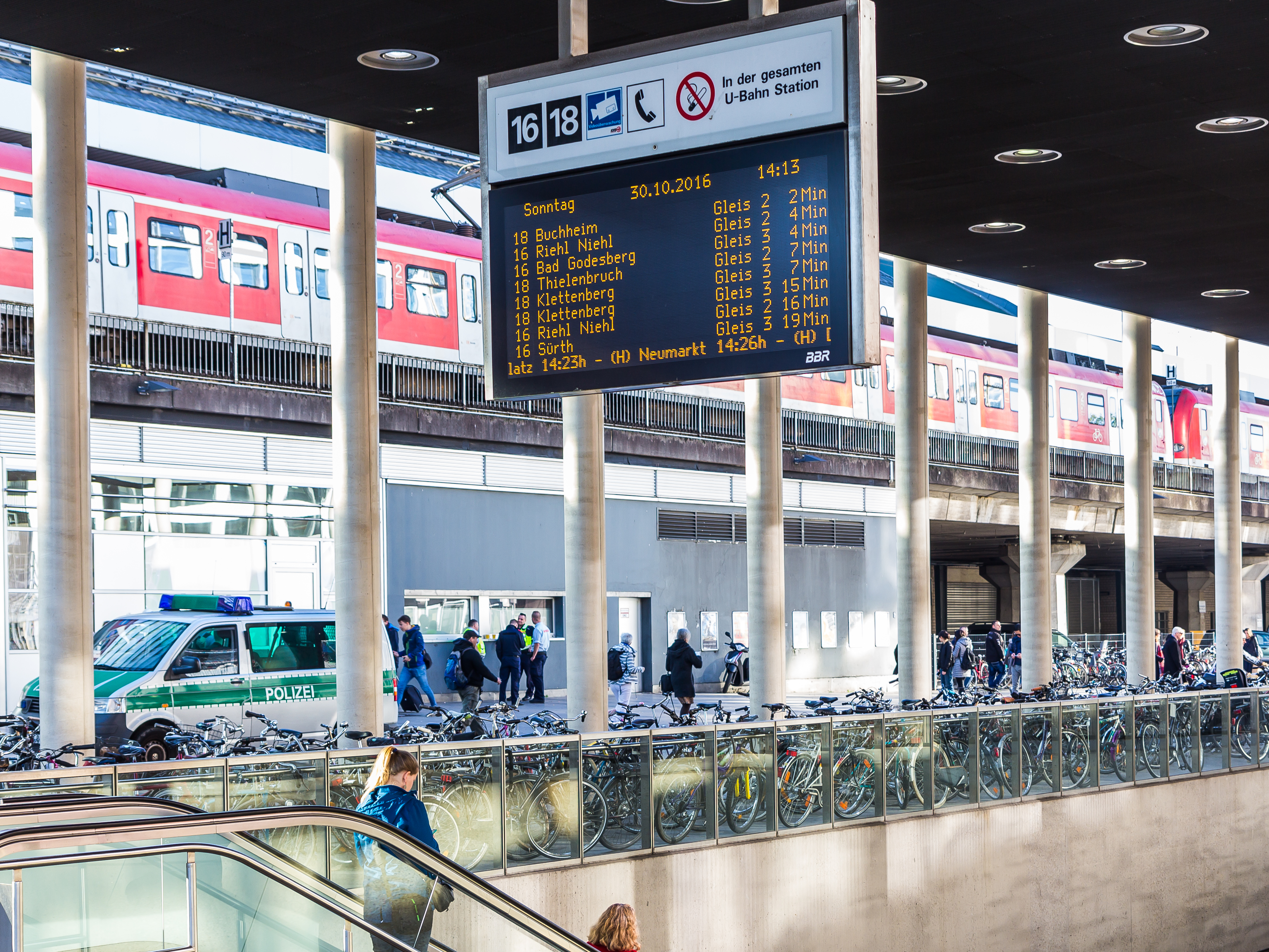
Large display at Breslauer Platz/Hbf station

All Stadtbahn trains have speakers to play announcements, and in the 1970s the trams were retrofitted with these as well. Since the 1990s all trains are fitted with at least two displays showing the next station, or while in a station, the terminus. Because the recorded announcements became increasingly pieced together with every timetable change, they were all newly recorded in 2003. In 2010, after a previous test on line 13, the announcements on the east–west lines (1, 7, 9) got a larger amount of information with all possible connections (Stadtbahn, bus, regional- and intercity trains) being announced. Also for the first time in Cologne's history, the announcements on some important stations like Bahnhof Messe/Deutz were also done in English, but only giving important info for tourists, but these are no longer in use. Since 1 December 2012 all announcements include the connections, and are computer generated. Because of the amount of side-platforms, the exit side is only announced when it is on the left side.

Beginning with the stations of the city center tunnel, the other stations following step-by-step, they were first equipped with digital platform displays capable of showing the next 2 trains and a line of other information. In the 2000s these were replaced by new, bigger displays capable of 3 trains and one line of information, with some playing back an audible announcement at the station when a train enters the station. Interchange stations have larger displays, that show departures of all lines on all platforms. Since February 2021, these are getting replaced again with even larger displays capable of showing more trains, and will be capable of showing videos once a system update planned for mid 2022 is installed, for example to suggest passengers alternative routes when a train is cancelled. In a further step the displays inside the trains will be replaced by similar displays as well.

== See also ==
- Transportation in Cologne
- List of Cologne KVB stations
- List of rapid transit systems
- Rail transport in Germany
