= Clementine Helm =

German teacher and writer (1825–1896)

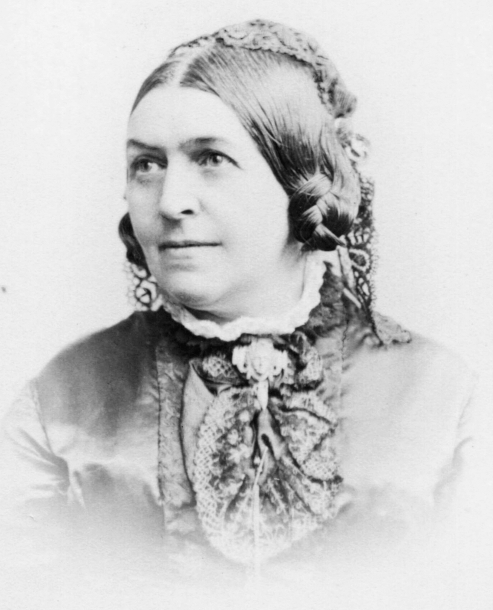
Clementine Helm

Henriette Clementine Helm Beyrich (9 October 1825, Delitzsch – 26 November 1896, Berlin) was a widely read author of books for children and young adults who published her works during the period of the German Empire. She was married to the geologist Heinrich Ernst Beyrich and took a keen interest in the natural sciences and often included various scientific ideas in her books, which were mainly meant for young girls.

== Life ==
=== Early years ===
Clementine Helm was born near Leipzig, as the daughter of the merchant Karl Helm (1785–1839) and his wife Henriette (née Schmidt 1794–1831). Since both of her parents died during her childhood, two of her maternal uncles successively took care of her. After having spent a few years at Merseburg, with the pedagogue Christian Weiss (1774–1853, possibly a great uncle on her mother's side), Clementine Helm moved to Berlin, where she lived with the family of the brother of her former guardian, Christian Samuel Weiss (1770-1856), who was a well-known professor of Mineralogy. Weiss had studied under Abraham Gottlieb Werner and was in contact with educators such as Johann Heinrich Pestalozzi. He was also interested in the kindergarten movement and was a teacher of Friedrich Froebel.

=== Marriage and family ===
Clementine moved to Berlin to obtain a teaching diploma at the "Königliche Luisenstiftung", a private school offering higher education to girls (see also: Höhere Mädchenschule). Afterwards she taught at a school for girls for several years. In 1848 she married Heinrich Ernst Beyrich, at the time a student of her uncle's who later became a renowned geologist and palaeontologist, as well as a professor at Berlin University. The couple had no children of their own, but adopted Clementine's nieces, Anna Wilhelmine (1846–1906) and Elly (1848–1917), after the death of her sister Wilhelmine Louise in 1851. Letters and diaries confirm that the two girls inspired her foster mother as a writer. In 1896, Clementine Helm died at the age of 71, one month after her husband had died. The family moved home around Berlin and Charlottenberg several times. Beyrich often travelled on his geological surveys to Silesia and Saxonia. It is not known if Clementine accompanied him but she attended meeting of the geologists across Germany, Austria and England.

=== Social circle ===
Besides scientists, associated with Ernst Beyrich, the families' circle of friends also included a number of novelists like Theodor Fontane and Otto Roquette, as well as the art historian Friedrich Eggers, who knew each other from the Rütli (literary group).

== Career ==
Clementine Helm started her career as an author with the publication of songs for children in 1861. She was the author of more than 40 books, many of which were printed in several editions. Besides books she also published many short stories as well as fairy-tales and was the publisher of various anthologies. In 1895, just a year before her death, she started publishing the annual "Junge Mädchen. Ein Almanach" together with Frida Schanz who continued publishing it until 1904. In her book Dornröschen und Schneewittchen (1893) a character was Dr Berner who was a mineralogist and one of the female characters was an orphan raised by a mineralogist who supported Darwin's ideas on evolution.

Translations of her works are available in English, French, Dutch and various Scandinavian languages. Her most successful book, Backfischchens Leiden und Freuden, is an example of the German genre Backfischroman, published in 1863.

== Legacy ==
Clementine Helm frequently made use of autobiographical episodes in her writing. Besides that her influence as a teacher was also present. Since she had obtained the highest form of education open to girls in the time of the German Empire one of her aims was to pass some of her knowledge on to her readers. As she was interested in science and biology—and had obviously read the works of Charles Darwin—she specifically made a point to mention his work On the Origin of Species in her novel Dornröschen und Schneewittchen. At the time favourable mention of Darwin's thoughts on evolution were very unusual content for a girls’ novel. Besides the reference to Darwin, the fact that religious topics were largely avoided, indicate that Helm was not particularly pious. On the whole Helm's books were ahead of their time by offering protagonists who were not just well-educated but often interested in natural sciences.

== Works in public domain ==
In the United States, Clementine Helm Beyrich's works in German and their translations are held in collections such as Princeton Library and New York Public Library. From these collections, a number of works have been digitized and are available to read or download from resources including HathiTrust and the Internet Archive. These works include: Gretchen's Joys and Sorrows (1877), Princess Eve (1878), Backfischchen's Leiden und Freuden or Auf Irrwegen und andere Erzählungen. Für junge Mädchen (1891).

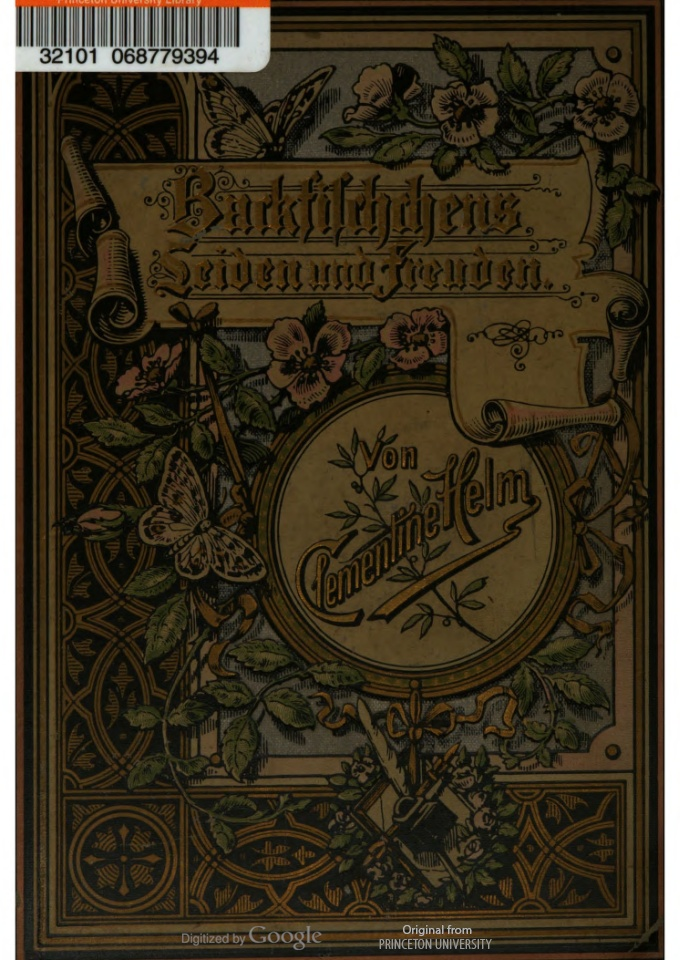
Book cover for Backfischchen's Leiden und Freuden; eine Erzählung für junge Mädchen by Clementine Helm (1863)—digitized book from Princeton library and now in public domain, may be downloaded from New York Public Libraries

== Selected works ==
- Kinder-Lieder (1861)
- Backfischchens Leiden und Freuden. Eine Erzählung für junge Mädchen, 1863 (Digitalisat der 15. Auflage 1879)
- Die Brieftaube (1871)
- Prinzesschen Eva (1875)
- Der Weg zum Glück (1881)
- Die Glücksbume von Capri (2. Auflage, 1887)
- Drei Erzählungen für junge Mädchen (3. Auflage, 1889)
- Unsere Selekta (3. Auflage, 1889)
- Frau Theodore (3. Auflage, 1889)
- Auf Irrwegen und andere Erzählungen. Für junge Mädchen (1891)
- Die Geschwister Leonhard (1891)
- Die Stiefschwestern (2. Auflage, 1891)
- Friedas Mädchenjahre und andere Erzählungen (1892)
- Dornröschen und Schneewittchen (3. Auflage, 1893)
- Das Heimchen (1894)
- Das Kränzchen (7. Auflage, 1895)
- Das vierblättrige Kleeblatt (4. Auflage, 1895)
- Doris und Dora (4. Auflage, 1895)
- Die kleine Herrin (1895)
- Elfriede (3. Auflage, 1895)
- Hans und Hanna (1895)
- Junge Mädchen. Ein Almanach begründet von Clementine Helm und Frida Schanz (1895)
- Elfchen Goldhaar (4. Auflage, 1897)
- Märchenbuch (3. Auflage 1897)

== Sources ==
- Hermann Arthur Lier (1902). "Beyrich, Clementine". Allgemeine Deutsche Biographie (in German). Vol. 46. Leipzig: Duncker & Humblot. pp. 535–536.
- Sophie Pataky: Lexikon deutscher Frauen der Feder, Bd. 1. C. Pataky, Berlin 1898, S. 331-332.
- Gisela Wilkending (Hrsg.): Mädchenliteratur der Kaiserzeit. Metzler, Stuttgart 2003, S. 309, ISBN 3-476-01963-2.
