= Ludwig Brunow =

German sculptor (1843–1913)

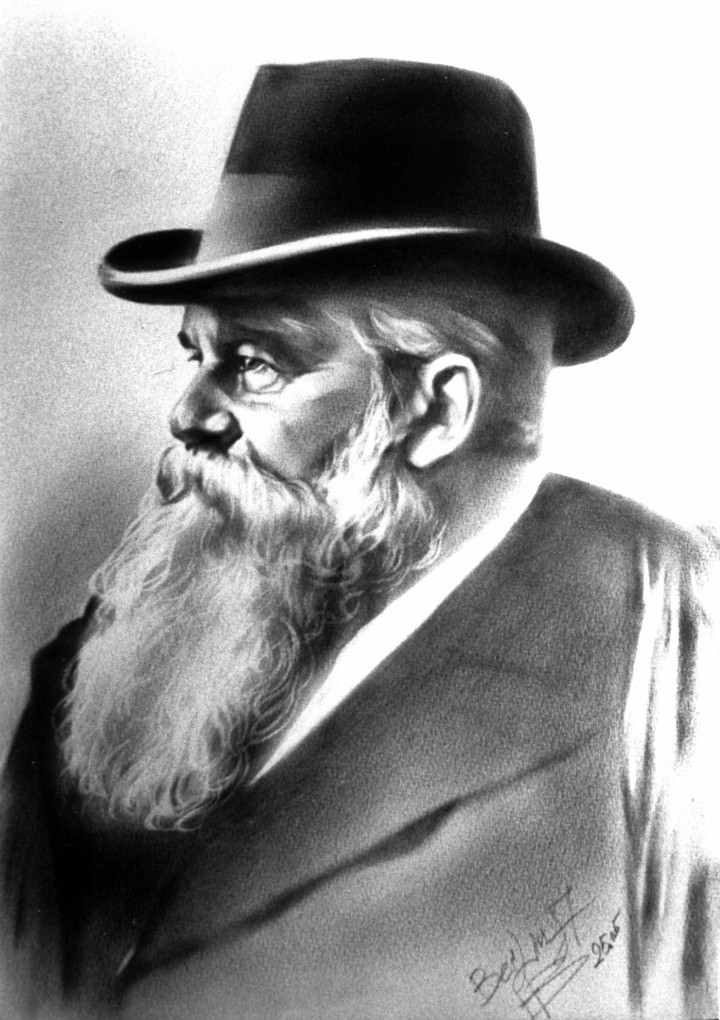
Ludwig Brunow (1898), drawing from a photograph.

Ludwig Brunow (9 July 1843, Lutheran – 13 January 1913, Berlin) was a German sculptor.

== Life ==
He was the illegitimate child of the local sexton's daughter and spent most of his youth working as a shepherd but quickly caught up on his education when the opportunity arose. First, he went to Lübz, completing an apprenticeship in carpentry, then found work as a journeyman in Rostock, where he began taking drawing lessons. In 1866, he planned to emigrate to America, but his plans fell through, and he became a student of Eduard Lürssen at the Bauakademie in Berlin. The following year, his talent was recognized by the art historian Friedrich Eggers and, at Eggers request, he moved to the Prussian Academy of Art. From 1871 to 1873, he worked as an assistant on the staffs of Rudolf Siemering and Christian Genschow.

He won his first award in 1876 at the Centennial Exhibition in Philadelphia, followed that same year by the "Verdienstkreuz" of the House Order of the Wendish Crown of Mecklenburg-Schwerin. In 1893, he was appointed a "Grand Ducal Professor". In 1901 he closed his studio and stopped accepting large projects. In his spare time, he was a member of a private chamber music quartet, along with the poet Karl Eggers (Friedrich's brother) and Heinrich Seidel. His grave in the Alter Zwölf-Apostel-Kirchhof is unmarked.

== Selected major works ==
An exhaustive list of his works may be found in the corresponding article on German Wikipedia

- 1876: Statue of Helmut von Moltke, Moltkeplatz, Parchim
- 1884: Statue of Frederick I, Berlin-Mitte, Ruhmeshalle (Hall of Fame); in Hohenzollern Castle since 1961.
- 1884: Statue of Frederick William II, Berlin-Mitte, Ruhmeshalle; in Hohenzollern Castle since 1961.
- 1886: Cornice sculpture of Gustavus II Adolphus, Lützen, Rathaus.
- 1891: Statues with copper sheet of John Albert I, Duke of Mecklenburg and Frederick Francis II, Rostock, Ständehaus; part of a four-figure group (the other two are by Oskar Rassau)
- 1893: Equestrian statue of Frederick Francis II. Schwerin, castle garden.
- 1898: Statue of Otto von Bismarck, Elberfeld; melted down during World War II.
- 1900: Equestrian statue of Kaiser Wilhelm I, Erfurt, Kaiserplatz; melted down during World War II.
- 1902: Bust on a pedestal of Ernst Dircksen, Berlin, Bahnhof Friedrichstraße; melted down during World War II.

== Gallery ==
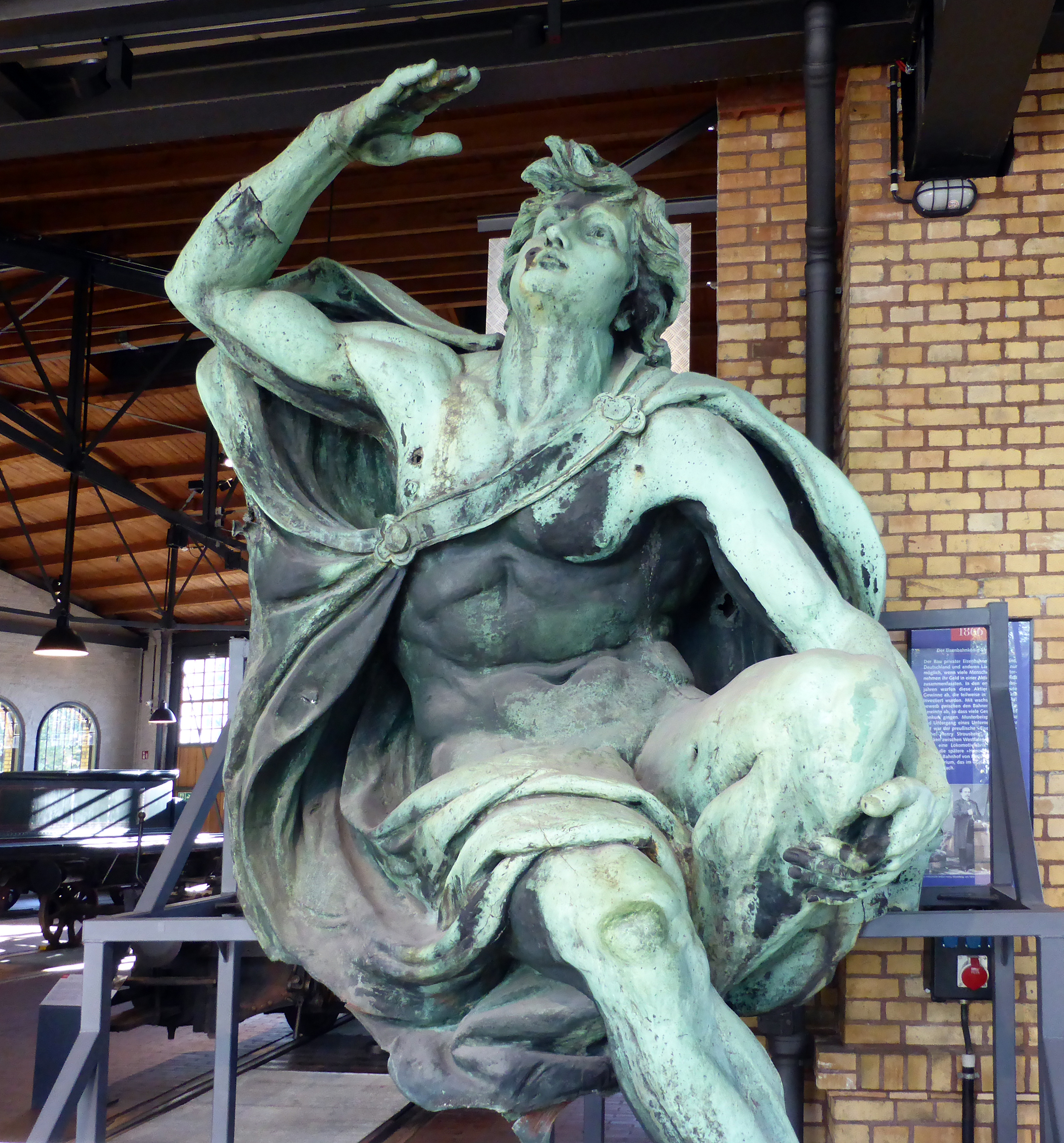
Ludwig Brunow Figur - Tag

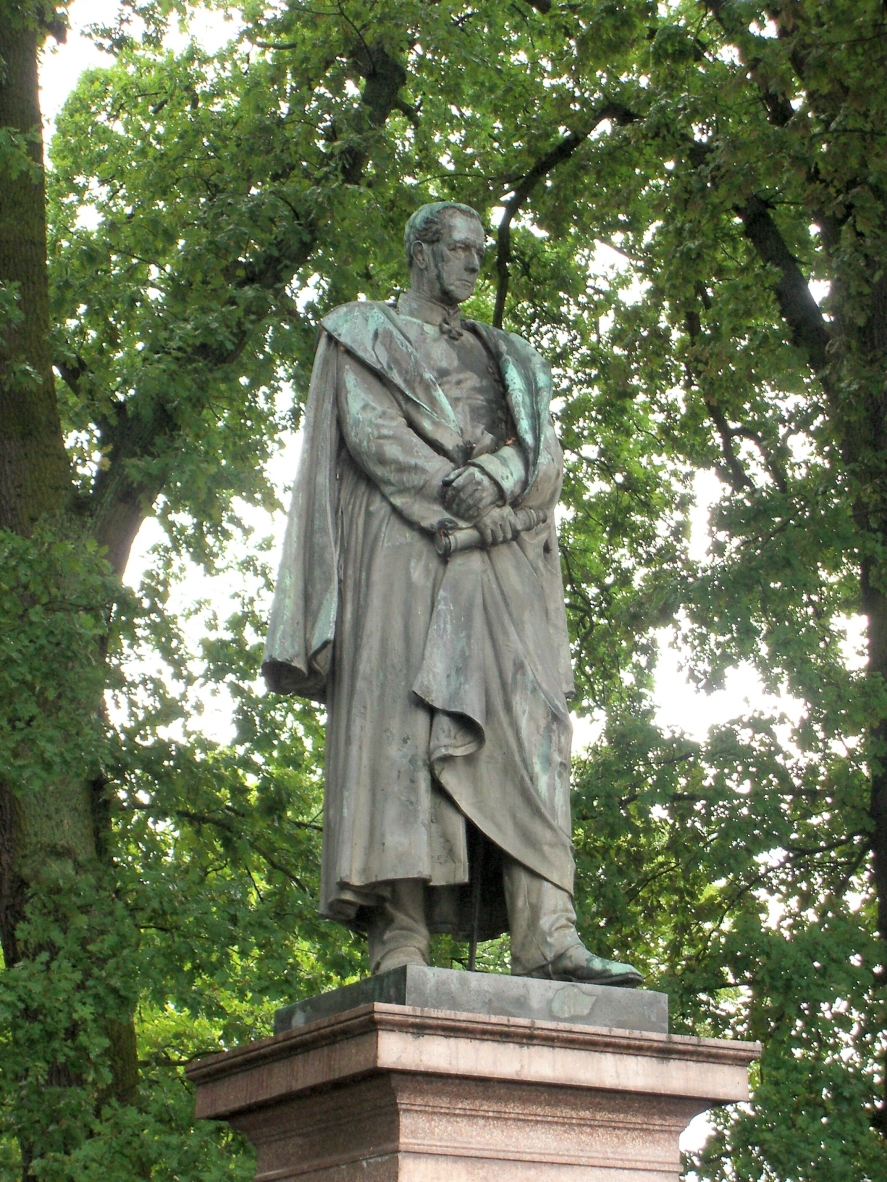
Helmut von Moltke, Parchim

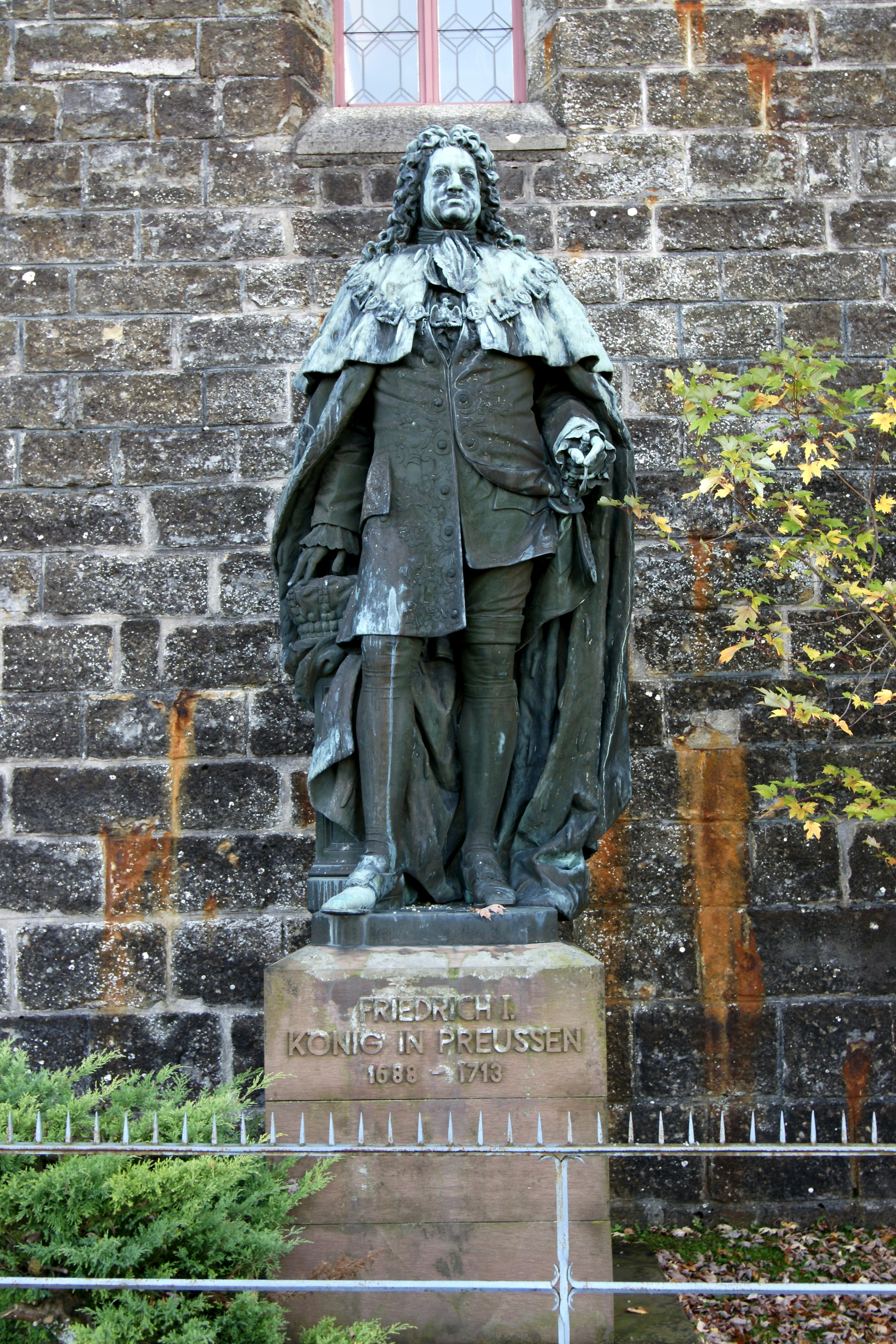
Frederick I of Prussia, Berlin-Mitte

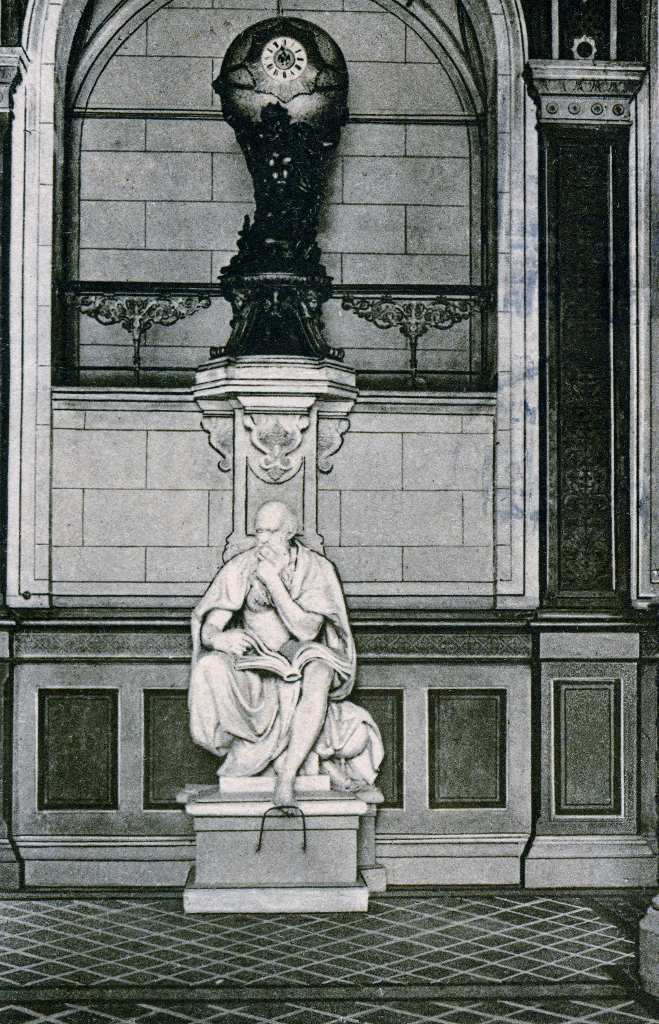
Rostock Universität Figur Weisheit

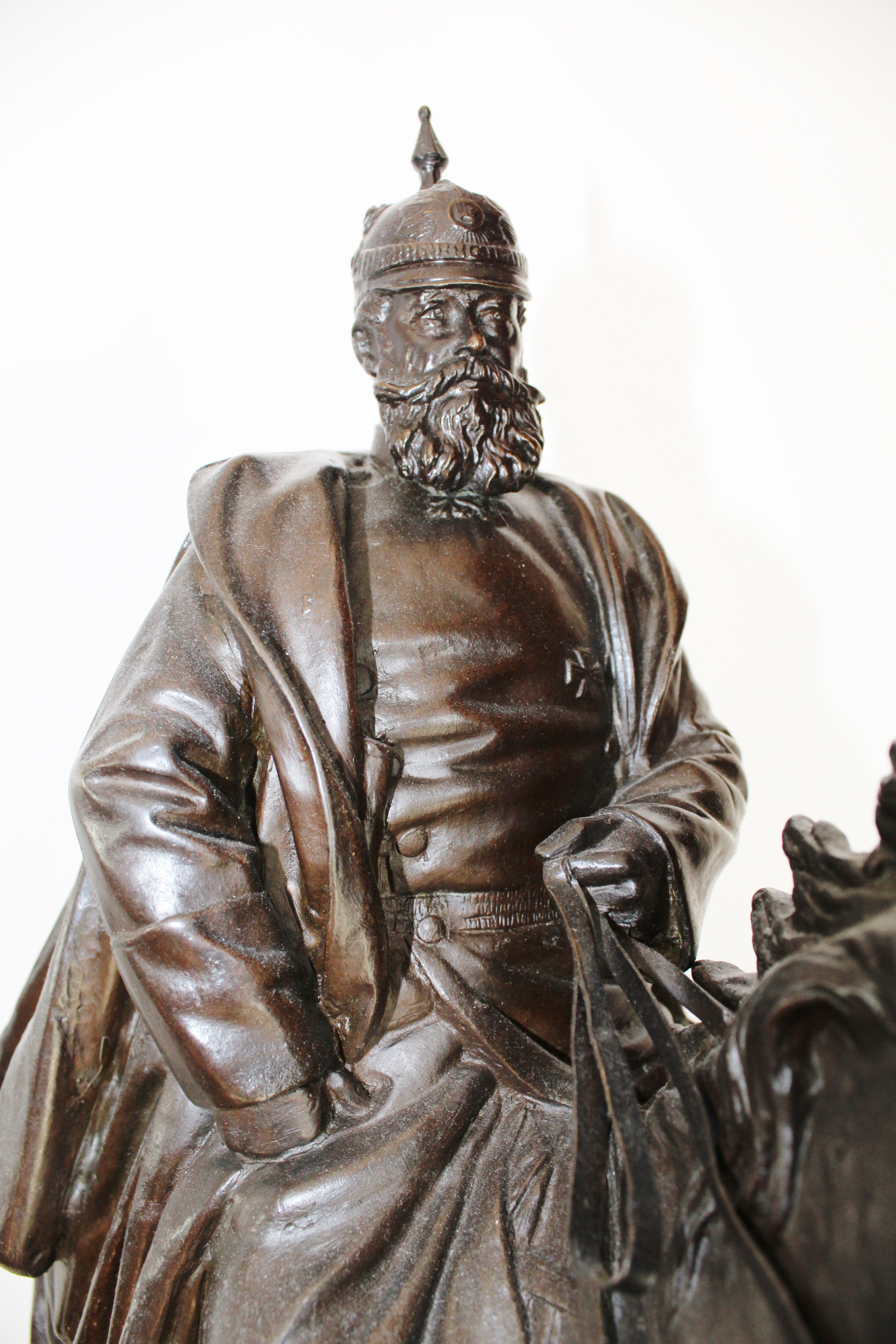
Ludwig Brunow Replik Denkmal Friedrich Franz II

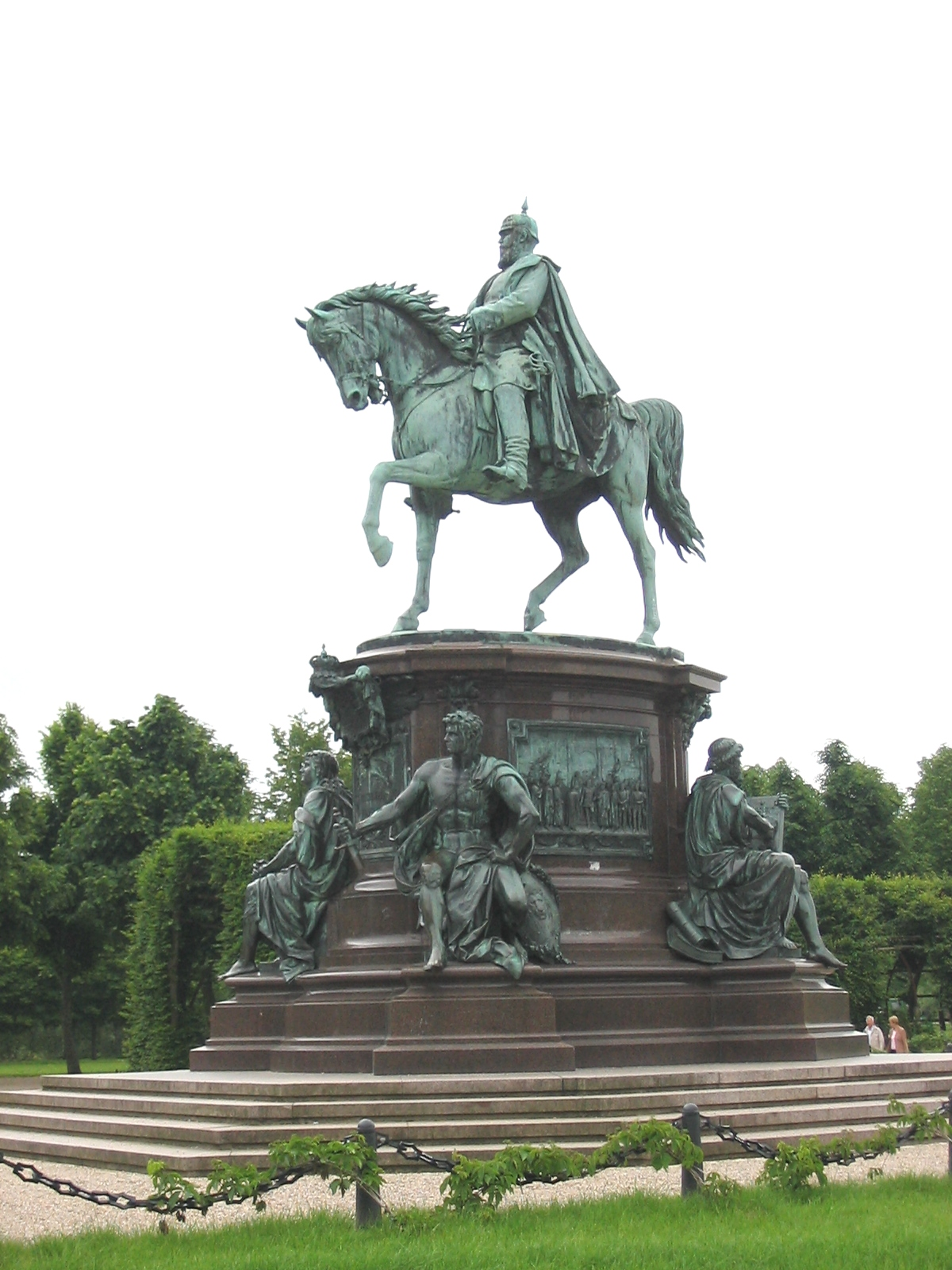
Frederick Francis II, Schwerin

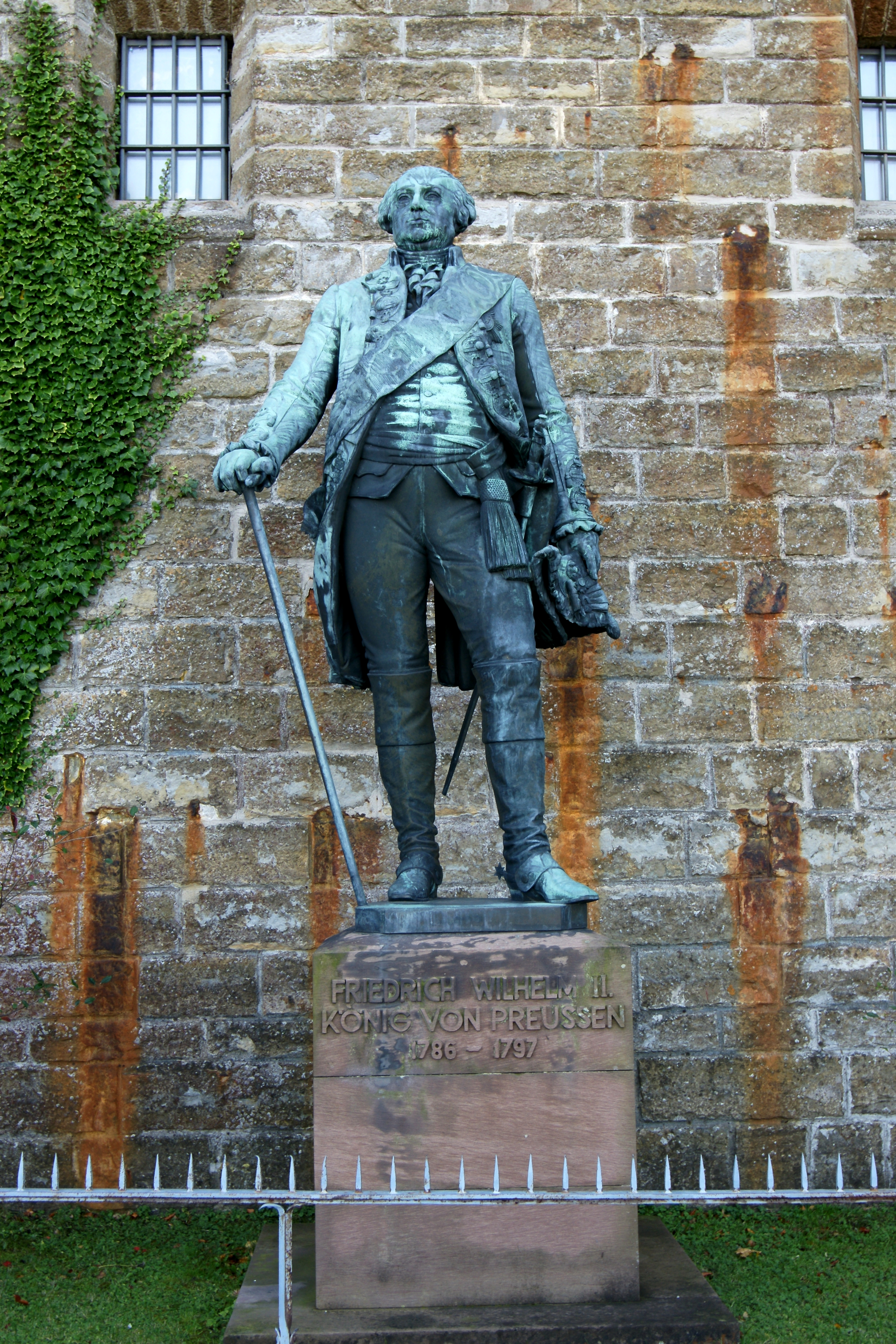
Frederick William II, Berlin-Mitte

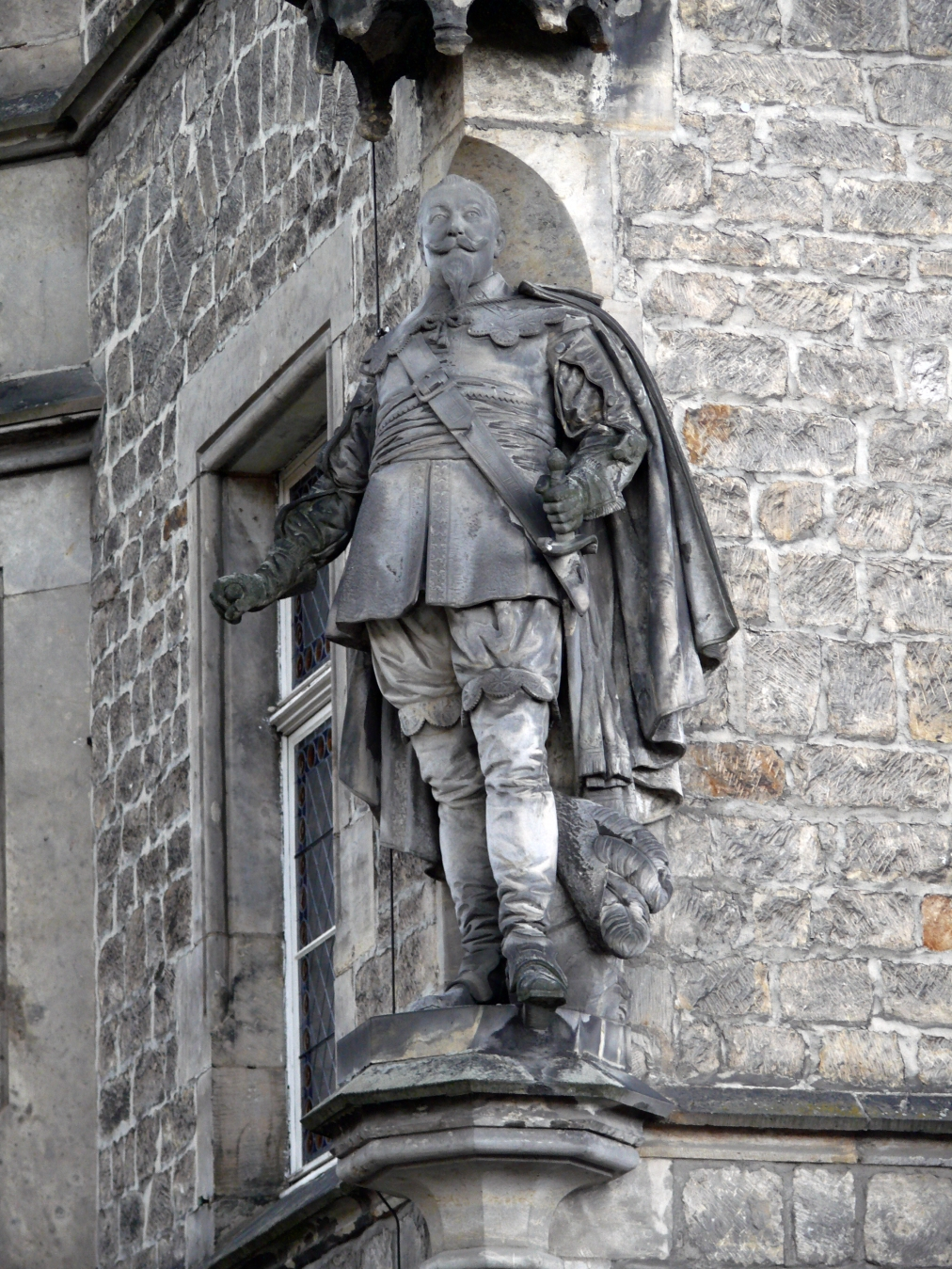
Gustavus Adolphus, Lützen

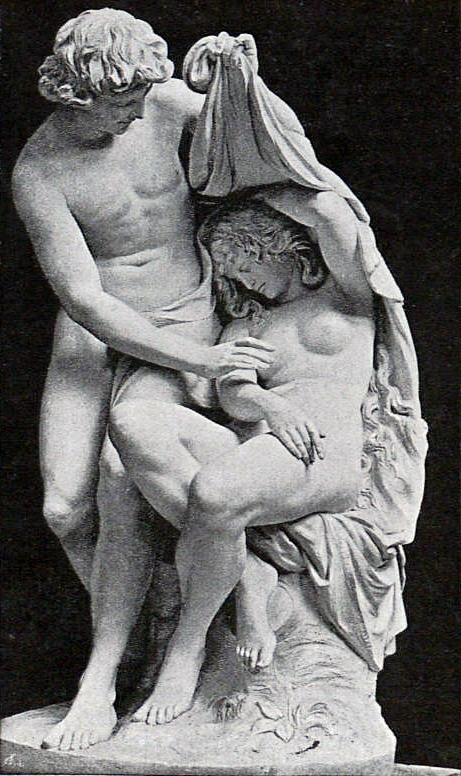
Ludwig Brunow Erfüllter Traum
