= Karl Eggers =

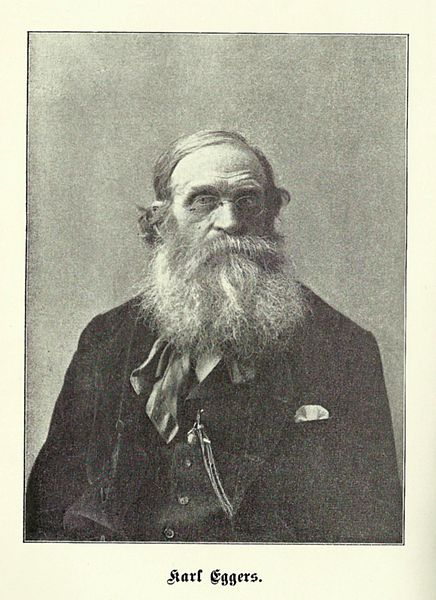
Karl Eggers; from the Rutgeben von den Allgemeenen Plattdütschen Verband. (1902)

Karl Friedrich Peter Eggers (7 June 1826 – 18 July 1900) was a German lyric poet. His older brother was the art historian Friedrich Eggers.

== Biography ==
He was born in Rostock, the fifth of eight children of Christian Friedrich Eggers (1788–1858), a building materials dealer. After completing his primary education, he studied jurisprudence, beginning in 1846 at the University of Leipzig then, in 1847, in Berlin. He passed the bar exam in 1850 and returned to Rostock. He was, however, denied habilitation by the Mecklenburg Ministry of Education.

After receiving his Doctorate in law, he worked as a lawyer and Gerichtspräsident (Chief Judge). In 1854, he was elected to the Rostock Stadtrat (City Council). Two years later, he became seriously ill and resigned from all of his positions for a curative stay in Italy. While there, he studied art and published essays on the subject in an art journal edited by his brother Friedrich; the Deutsches Kunstblatt.

In 1861, he moved to Berlin, where he cultivated connections with writers and artists, such as Emanuel Geibel, Paul Heyse, Adolf Wilbrandt, Otto Roquette, and Theodor Fontane. Perhaps his most important connection was with Heinrich Seidel, who introduced him to the editors at Verlag Cotta, a publishing house in Stuttgart. For many years, Seidel and Eggers shared a combination home and office in Berlin. During those years, he became a strong supporter of the Gabelsberger shorthand method.

He was a member of the Low German Society and, together with his brother, Friedrich, he published collections of poetry in Low German which, although critically praised, were not financially successful. A third edition was published and distributed by Verlag F. Fontane & Co. in 1890. After his brother's death, he completed a five volume biography of the sculptor Christian Daniel Rauch that Friedrich had been working on for several years.

From 1895, he lived with his family in Rostock. Although technically retired, he was active in the Rostock Kunstverein (art association), the Altertumsverein (antiquities club) and the local Low German Society. The sculptor, Ludwig Brunow, created a bust of him, but it has since been lost. Eggers died in Warnemünde.
