= Köln West station =

Railway station in Germany

Köln West
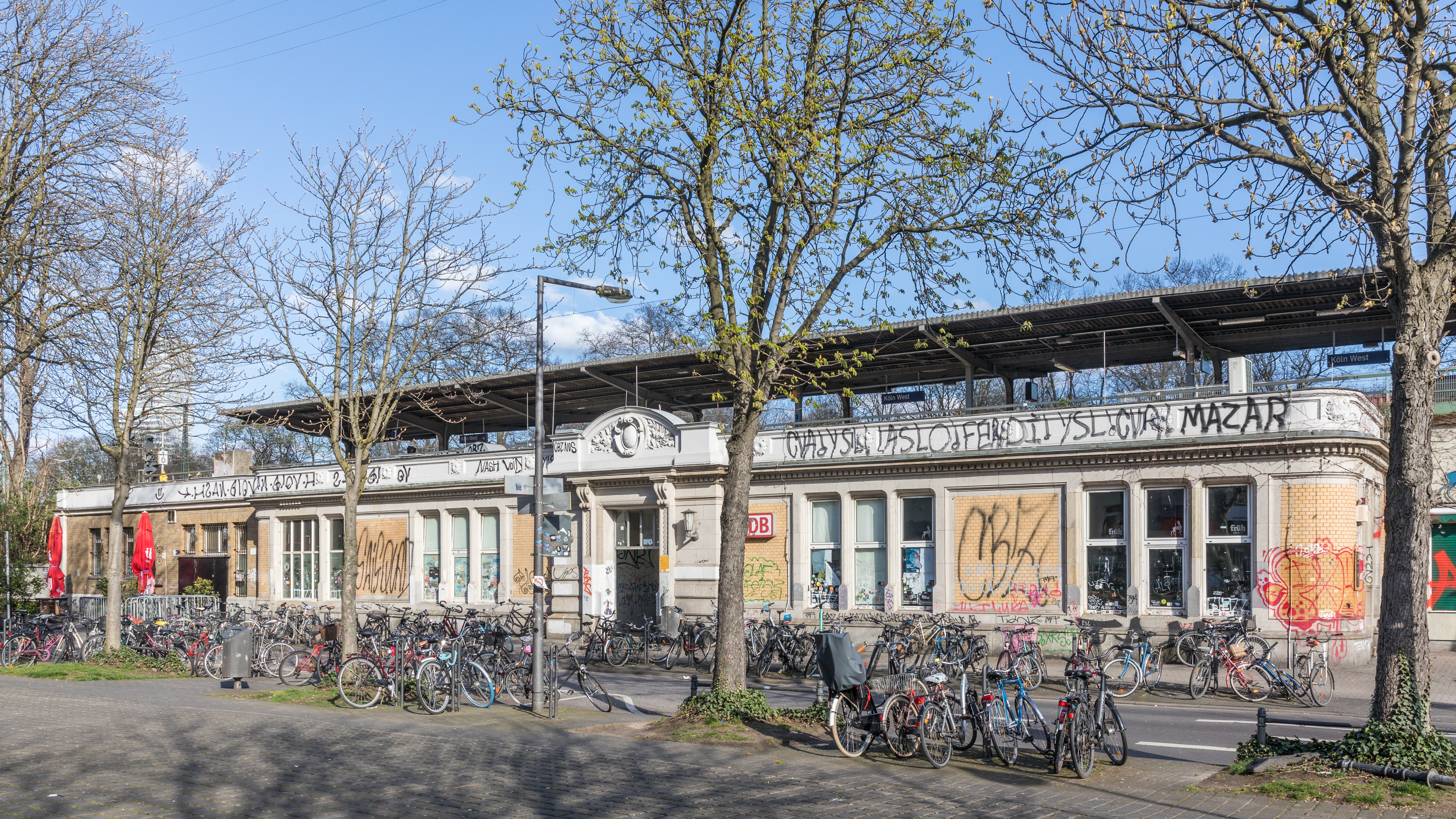
- Station building

General information
- Location: Hans-Böckler-Platz 2, Cologne, NRW; Germany
- Coordinates: 50°56′37″N 6°56′2″E
- Owner: Deutsche Bahn
- Operator: DB Netz; DB Station&Service
- Lines: West Rhine Railway; Innenstadt tunnel
- Platforms: 4

Construction
- Accessible: Yes

Other information
- Station code: 3324
- DS100 code: KKW
- IBNR: 8003363
- Category: 4
- Fare zone: VRS: 2100
- Website: www.bahnhof.de

History
- Opened: 1891

Services
Preceding station	DB Regio NRW	Following station
Köln-Süd towards Trier Hbf	RE 12	Köln Hbf towards Köln Messe/Deutz
Köln-Süd towards Gerolstein	RE 22	Köln Hbf towards Köln Messe/Deutz
Köln-Süd towards Gerolstein	RB 24	Köln Hbf towards Köln Messe/Deutz
Preceding station	National Express Germany	Following station
Köln-Süd towards Bonn-Mehlem	RB 48 (Rhein-Wupper-Bahn)	Köln Hbf towards Wuppertal-Oberbarmen
Preceding station	Trans Regio	Following station
Köln-Süd towards Mainz Hbf	RB 26	Köln Hbf towards Köln Messe/Deutz

Other services
Preceding station	Cologne Stadtbahn	Following station
Piusstraße towards Görlinger-Zentrum	Line 3	Friesenplatz towards Thielenbruch
Piusstraße towards Bocklemünd	Line 4	Friesenplatz towards Schlebusch
Gutenbergstraße towards Sparkasse Am Butzweilerhof	Line 5	Friesenplatz towards Heumarkt
Location

Köln West (Cologne West) station is located in the northwestern edge of the Innenstadt of Cologne in the district of Neustadt-Nord in the German state of North Rhine-Westphalia. It is located on Venloer Straße (street). The station is a stop for regional services on the Cologne ring railway (part of the West Rhine Railway). It is also served by lines 3, 4 and 5 lines of the Cologne Stadtbahn, which run through the Hans-Böckler-Platz/Bf. West underground station. The surface station has two platform tracks on a 303-metre-long island platform and eight tracks without platforms, which are used by intensive freight traffic.

== History ==
The opening of Central Station (Centralbahnhof, now called the Hauptbahnhof) in 1859 required the building of a connecting line to the West Rhine Railway (German: Linke Rheinstrecke), running around the city to the west. The Prussian government built a new line of fortifications around Cologne and the new district of Neustadt (new town) inside the fortifications from 1881, requiring the reorganisation of the railway lines. On 9 January 1883, the City Council approved the relocation of the line on an embankment, which was built further from the centre than previously. This embankment ran on the inside of the new inner ring of fortifications through the new town and underpasses were built for all roads running to exits in the fortifications. Along the new line two stations were built under the direction of Ernst Dircksen: Cologne West (Köln West, spelt Cöln West until 1914) and Cologne South (Köln Süd). Both stations were opened in 1891. The front of the station building, which largely corresponds to its original appearance has been preserved until today, but there was formerly a waiting room located on the embankment, which spanned the platform area and the passenger tracks.

== Lines ==
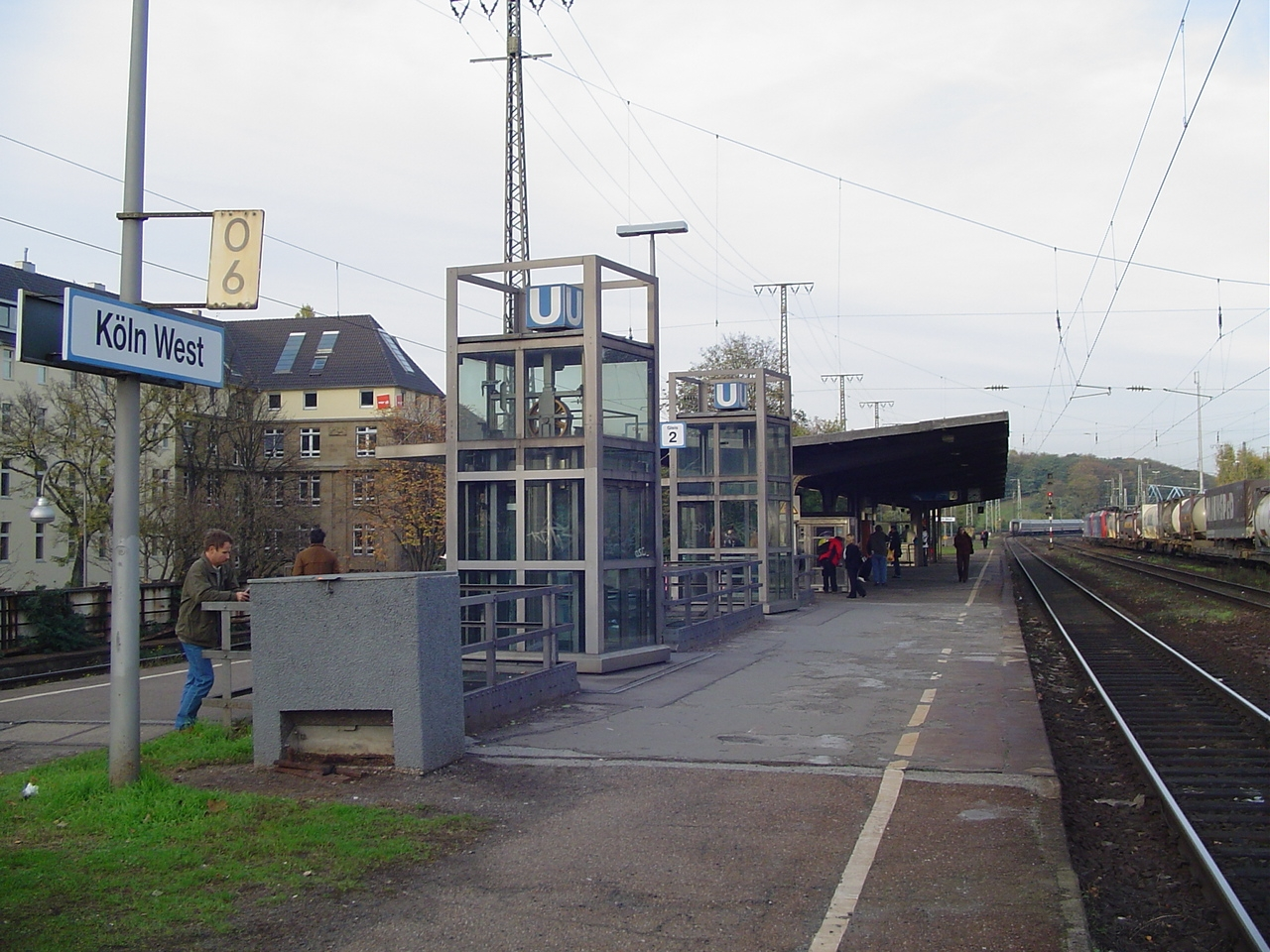
Platform with lifts to the Stadtbahn

The passenger tracks separate from each other immediately north of the station. While the north-bound track runs relatively directly towards Cologne Central Station (Hbf), the south-bound track runs in a wide arc north of the operations station (Betriebsbahnhof, where trains coming from or going to Cologne Hbf are assembled, disassembled or parked), meaning that it is almost 500 m longer than the other track. The freight train tracks separate at an at-grade junction at the northern end of West Cologne station; one line connects to the Ehrenfeld district and on to the Cologne–Aachen high-speed railway and another runs to Cologne-Nippes and on to the Lower Left Rhine Railway. In addition, sidings branch from the so-called Schlundgleis (gullet track) that runs through the dismantled Köln Gereon freight yard and pass through several underpasses to the operating station.

Because of the dense traffic on the freight tracks the platform is populated by railway enthusiasts in good weather.

== Surface station ==
The platform of Cologne West is 38 centimeters-high and is thus the lowest of all passenger stations in Cologne. New LCD destination displays were installed in the autumn of 2007. There are two lifts on the platform, both of which lead to Venloer Straße and to the platforms of the Stadtbahn station.

=== Rail services ===
Cologne South station is served by all regional services on the Eifel Railway:

Line	Route	Frequency
RE 12	Trier – Gerolstein – Kall – Cologne West – Cologne Hbf – Köln Messe/Deutz	120 min
RE 22	Gerolstein – Kall – Cologne West – Cologne Hbf – Köln Messe/Deutz	120 min
RB 24	Kall – Cologne West – Cologne Hbf – Köln Messe/Deutz	60 min

It is also served by two Regionalbahn services on the West Rhine Railway:

Line	Route	Frequency
RB 26	Köln Messe/Deutz – Cologne West – Bonn Hbf – Remagen – Andernach – Koblenz Hbf – Mainz	60 min
RB 48	Wuppertal-Oberbarmen – Wuppertal Hbf – Solingen Hbf – Cologne West – Brühl – Bonn-Mehlem	60 min

== Stadtbahn station ==
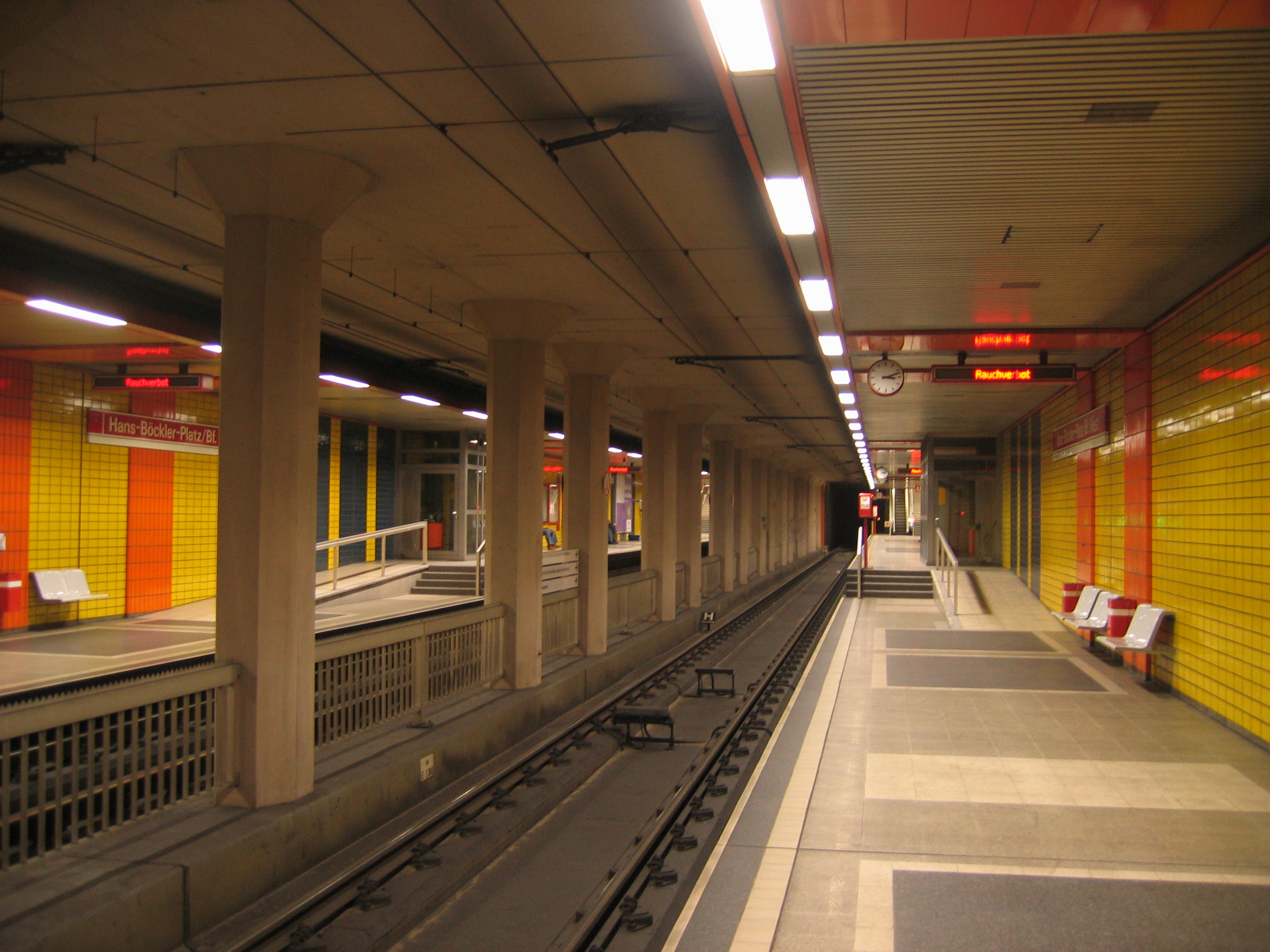
The Stadtbahn station

At right angles to Cologne West surface station is the Hans-Böckler-Platz/Bf. West underground station of the Cologne Stadtbahn, which is served by lines 3, 4 and 5. As well as staircase access from the station forecourt there are two lifts that directly connect with the underground station. At the western end of the station, line 5 separates from lines 3 and 4 at a grade separated-junction. The remaining 30 cm-high platform sections were once used by line 5, but they have been operated by high-floor cars since 2002 and only the 90-cm high sections of the platform are now used. Since almost all stations towards the city centre are now converted to high-level platforms, passenger operations with low-floor trains are no longer possible.
