= Körnerstraße station =

Railway station in Cologne, Germany

Körnerstraße
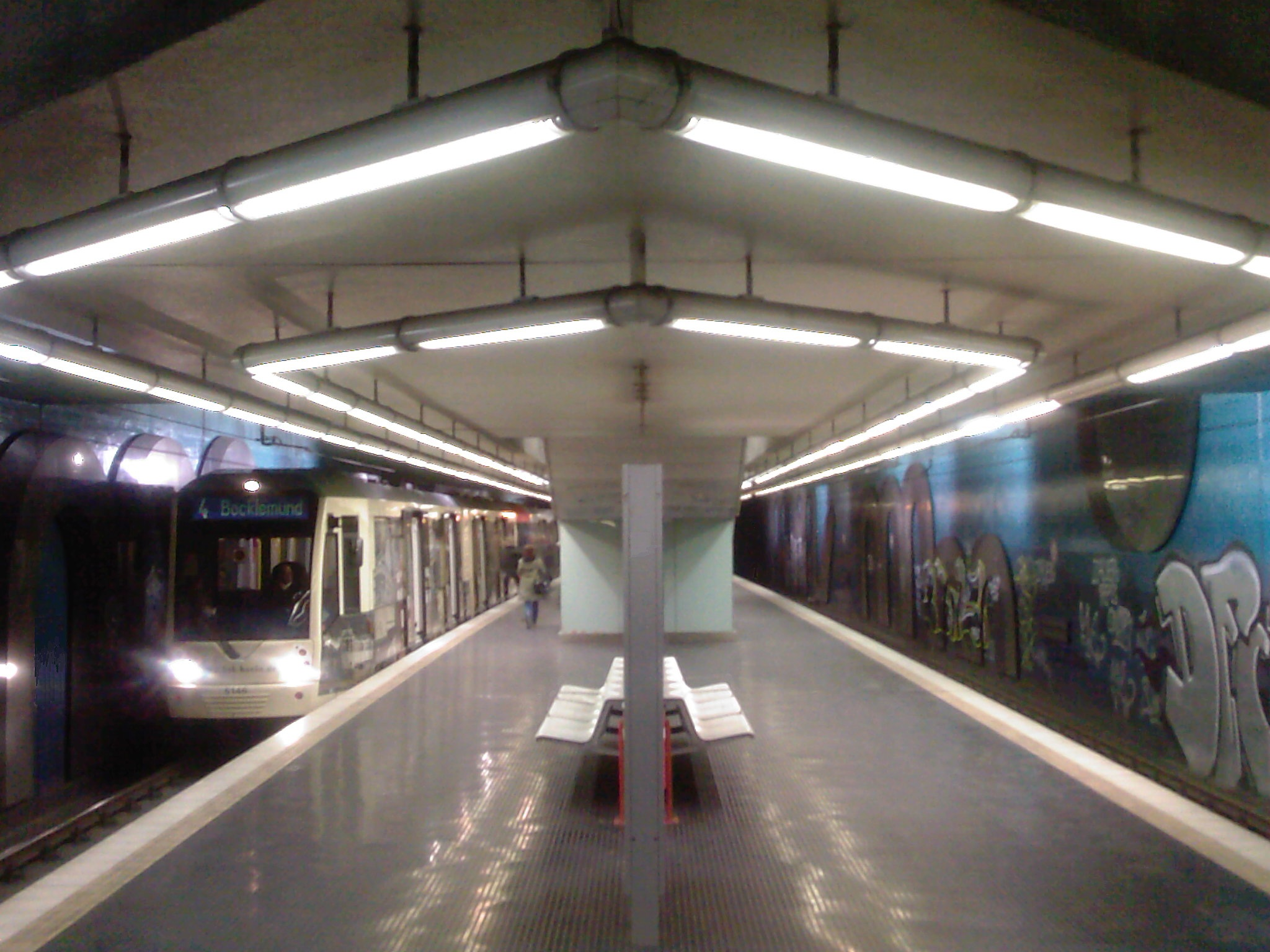
- Körnerstraße station

General information
- Location: Venloer Straße, 50823 Köln
- Coordinates: 50°56′52″N 6°55′19″E
- Owner: Kölner Verkehrs-Betriebe
- Platforms: 1 island platform

Construction
- Structure type: Underground
- Accessible: Yes

Other information
- Fare zone: VRS: 2100

History
- Opened: 1989

Services
Preceding station	Cologne Stadtbahn	Following station
Venloer Straße/Gürtel towards Görlinger-Zentrum	Line 3	Piusstraße towards Thielenbruch
Venloer Straße/Gürtel towards Bocklemünd	Line 4	Piusstraße towards Schlebusch
Route map
Location

Körnerstraße is an underground station on the Cologne Stadtbahn lines 3 and 4 in Cologne. The station lies on Venloer Straße, corner Körnerstraße in the district of Ehrenfeld.

The station was opened in 1989 and consists of a mezzanine and one island platform with two rail tracks.

== Notable places nearby ==
- Venloer Straße
- Neptunbad
- Church of St. Joseph
- Church of the Assumption

== See also ==
- List of Cologne KVB stations
