= Titus Ullrich =

German poet, dramatist and critic

- Born: August 22, 1813; Bystrzyca Kłodzka (Habelschwerdt), County of Kladsko
- Died: December 17, 1891 (aged 78); Berlin, German Empire
- Education: University of Breslau; University of Berlin
- Occupations: Poet; art critic; literary critic; civil servant
- Spouse: Emilie Ribbeck
- Writing career
- Genres: Philosophical epic; lyric poetry; travel literature
- Literary movement: Young Germany (influenced by Ludwig Feuerbach)

Titus Ullrich (22 August 1813 – 17 December 1891) was a German poet, dramatist, art critic and literary critic from the County of Kladsko. Some of his songs were set by Robert Schumann.

The son of a farmer and grandson of the Mayor of Habelschwerdt (now Bystrzyca Kłodzka), he was born in the Hallmannschen Haus, Ring no. 7, where his mother had taken refuge during the disorder of the war. Raised by his grandfather, he entered the Glatzer Gymnasium in 1825, and proceeded in 1832 to Breslau to study philosophy and classics, continuing his studies in Berlin one year later. He earned his doctorate in 1836.

The death of his father thwarted his plan of a habilitation, and he took employment as a private tutor in Berlin. His first works, Das Hohe Lied and Viktor, were published in 1845 and 1847 and attracted a cult following. These ambitious philosophical epics championed the ideas of Ludwig Feuerbach. In 1848 he improved his financial position by taking a job as a columnist at the National-Zeitung, where he remained until 1860. He was one of the founders of the Rütli literary group. In 1854 he travelled to Italy, and in 1857 he was able to visit the major art exhibition in Manchester, taking the opportunity to explore England and Scotland, and, on the way home, Belgium and Paris. His observations were published in the National-Zeitung and were collected after his death as Reisestudien (1893).

Towards the end of 1860 he was appointed privy secretary in the offices of the General Intendant of the Royal Theatre. He was later promoted to Privy Counsellor to the King, and then commissary. He continued to publish poetry but later regretted that he had not devoted more effort to his creative writing. His marriage to Emilie Ribbeck was happy and his life generally uneventful. He went into retirement in 1887, and died in Berlin in 1891.

== Selected works ==
- 1845: Das Hohe Lied
- 1847: Viktor
- after 1887: Dichtungen

=== Posthumous ===
- 1893: Reisestudien aus Italien, England und Schottland
- 1894: Kritische Aufsätze über Kunst, Litteratur und Theater

== Bibliography ==
- Brümmer: Lexikon der deutschen Dichter und Prosaisten des 19. Jahrhunderts
- Ludwig Julius Fränkel (1895). "Ullrich, Titus" . Allgemeine Deutsche Biographie (in German). Vol. 39. Leipzig: Duncker & Humblot. pp. 201–203.
- Schlesische Zeitung, 3 July 1887
