= Wilhelm Hauchecorne =

German geologist

Heinrich Hauchecorne
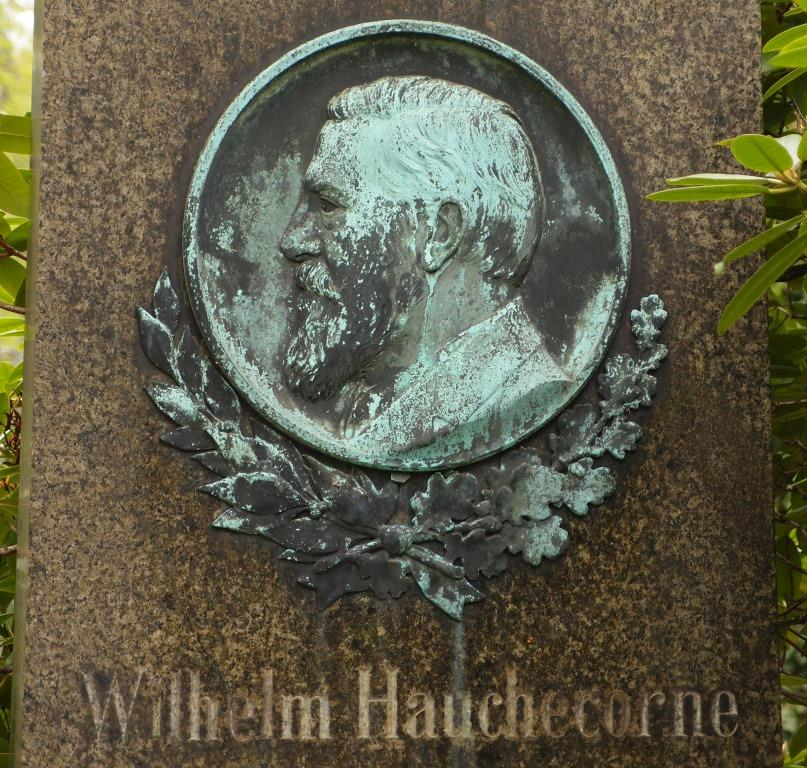
- Relief of Hauchecorne, located at his gravesite
- Born: August 13, 1828; Aachen, Kingdom of Prussia
- Died: January 15, 1900; Germany
- Education: University of Berlin, Bergakademie Freiberg
- Known for: Standardization of geological map color codes; development of mineralogical collections
- Honors: Hauchecornite (mineral named in 1892)
- Scientific career
- Fields: Geology, Mineralogy
- Workplaces: Berlin Mining Academy, Prussian National Geological Survey

Heinrich Lambert Wilhelm Hauchecorne (13 August 1828–15 January 1900) was a German geologist of French Huguenot parentage who was born in Aachen. He studied at the University of Berlin and at the Bergakademie in Freiberg. Among his instructors were Heinrich Ernst von Beyrich (1815–1896), Gustav Rose (1798–1873) and Christian Samuel Weiss (1780–1856). Afterward he became director of a copper mine near Rheinbreitbach, and in 1866 was appointed director of the Berlin Mining Academy. In 1873, he became the co-director of the Prussian National Geological Survey.

Hauchecorne is credited with development of the Geological Survey's geological and mineralogical collections, and was responsible for consolidation of rock and mineral collections. He also introduced a standardization of color-codes for use on German geological maps that was eventually adopted throughout Europe.

Hauchecorne belonged to the leading members of the "German Society for Popular Science" (Deutsche Gesellschaft für volkstümliche Naturkunde), founded in Berlin in 1894.

In 1892, the mineral hauchecornite was named in his honor.
