= Piusstraße station =

Underground station on the Cologne Stadtbahn

Piusstraße
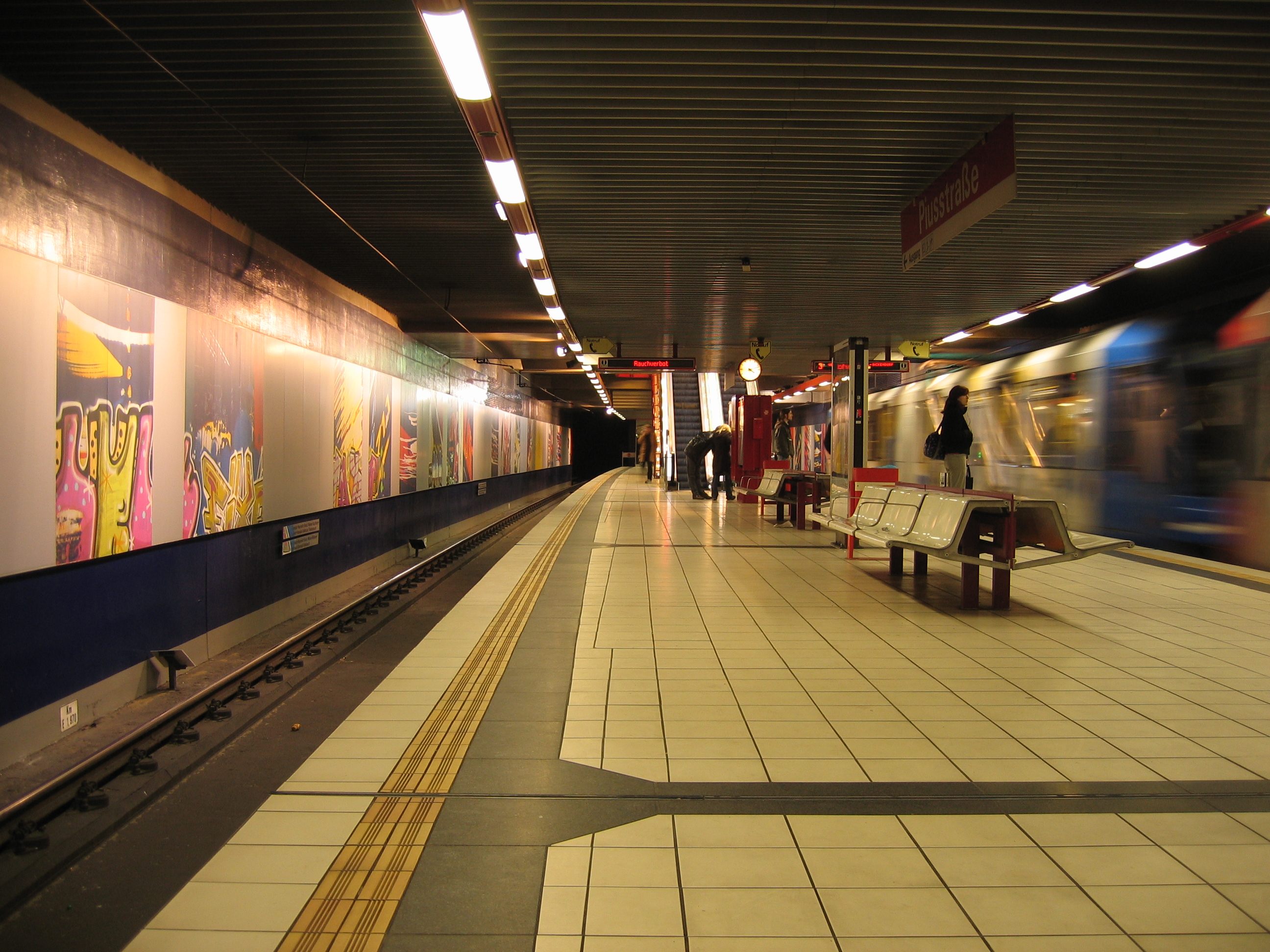
- Piusstraße station

General information
- Location: Venloer Straße, 50823 Köln
- Coordinates: 50°56′45″N 6°55′35″E
- Owner: Kölner Verkehrs-Betriebe
- Platforms: 1 island platform

Construction
- Structure type: Underground
- Accessible: Yes

Other information
- Fare zone: VRS: 2100

History
- Opened: 1989

Services
Preceding station	Cologne Stadtbahn	Following station
Körnerstraße towards Görlinger-Zentrum	Line 3	Hans-Böckler-Platz/Bf West towards Thielenbruch
Körnerstraße towards Bocklemünd	Line 4	Hans-Böckler-Platz/Bf West towards Schlebusch
Route map
Location

Piusstraße is an underground station on the Cologne Stadtbahn lines 3 and 4 in Cologne. The station lies on Venloer Straße, corner Piusstraße in the district of Ehrenfeld.

The station was opened in 1989 and consists of a mezzanine and one island platform with two rail tracks.

== Notable places nearby ==
- Venloer Straße
- Cologne Central Mosque
- Church of St. Mechtern

== See also ==
- List of Cologne KVB stations
