= Else Wildhagen =

German writer (1861–1944)

Else Wildhagen (German: [ˈɛlzə ˈvɪlt.haːgn̩]; née Friedrich-Friedrich, 10 January 1863, Leipzig – 9 August 1944, Leipzig) was a German writer. She was the daughter of the author of Der Trotzkopf, Emmy von Rhoden, and the writer Hermann Friedrich Friedrich. She was married to the German jurist, Georg Wildhagen, since 1885.

== Works ==
As a writer, she was the author of the three sequels of her mother's masterpiece, Der Trotzkopf.

- Trotzkopfs Brautzeit
- Aus Trotzkopfs Ehe
- Trotzkopfs Nachkommen

Her mother's main work as well as the further stories that she published influenced children's literature in the Netherlands as well.
