= Rütli (literary group) =

Der Rütli (or: Das Rütli, Rytly, or Rytli) was a German literary group, named after the famous Swiss meadow. It was founded on 9 December 1852 by members of the Tunnel über der Spree as "a kind of subsidiary tunnel" ("eine Art Nebentunnel" — Theodor Fontane) with a more intimate atmosphere, in contrast to the ceremonial and public nature of the larger group's activities. They met weekly at one another's homes. One major difference between meetings of the Tunnel and meetings of the Rütli was that members' wives were admitted, albeit only after the "work" of the gathering was completed.

The members can be divided into the founders, or Ur-Rütlionen, and the Späteren. At first, the anniversary of the group's founding was celebrated each 9 December, but as this conflicted somewhat with the Tunnel's Stiftungsfest on 3 December, the date was moved to 5 February.

The group entertained many guests like Berthold Auerbach, Friedrich von Bodenstedt, Eduard Devrient and others.

By 1892, only three members still attended meetings; on 5 January 1897 Fontane wrote to Lazarus that "the Rütli's current slumber is a blessing; for years it's been in a tragic way."

== Members ==
Founding members

- Karl Bormann
- Friedrich Eggers
- Theodor Fontane
- Adalbert Noel
- Paul Heyse
- Franz Kugler
- Bernhard von Lepel
- Adolph von Menzel
- Wilhelm von Merckel
- Theodor Storm
- Titus Ullrich

Later members

- Leopold Goldammer
- Hugo von Blomberg
- Karl Eggers
- August von Heyden
- Paul Heyse
- Richard Lucae
- Moritz Lazarus
- Wilhelm Lübke
- Otto Roquette
- Karl Zöllner

== Works ==
- Argo. Belletristisches Jahrbuch für 1854. Edited by Theodor Fontane / Franz Kugler, Dessau 1854.
- Literatur-Blatt des deutschen Kunstblattes. Redacted by Friedrich Eggers, volume of the 1st year (Part of the 5th years volume of the Deutsches Kunstblatt), 1854; 2nd vol., 1855; 3rd vol. 1856; 4th vol. 1857.
- Argo. Album für Kunst und Dichtung. Edited by Friedrich Eggers / Theodor Hosemann / Franz Kugler, Breslau 1857; Edited by Friedrich Eggers / Theodor Hosemann / Bernhard von Lepel, ibid. 1858.
- Literatur-Blatt des Deutschen Kunstblattes, 5th vol. (part of the 9th vol. of the Deutsches Kunstblatt), 1858.
- Argo. Album für Kunst und Dichtung. Edited by Friedrich Eggers / Theodor Hosemann / Bernhard v. Lepel, Breslau 1859; Edited by Friedrich Eggers / Theodor Hosemann / Bernhard v. Lepel, ibid. 1860.

== Bibliography ==
- Roland Berbig / Wulf Wülfing: Art. Rütli [II] [Berlin]. In: Wulf Wülfing / Karin Bruns / Rolf Parr (eds.): Handbuch literarischer Vereine, Gruppen und Bünde 1825-1933. Stuttgart / Weimar: Metzler 1998 (Repertorien zur Deutschen Literaturgeschichte 18), p. 394-406. ISBN 3-476-01336-7 (cf. also: Roland Berbig: Art. Rütli [I] [Berlin], ibid., p. 392 f.).
