= Emmy von Rhoden =

German writer (1829-1885)

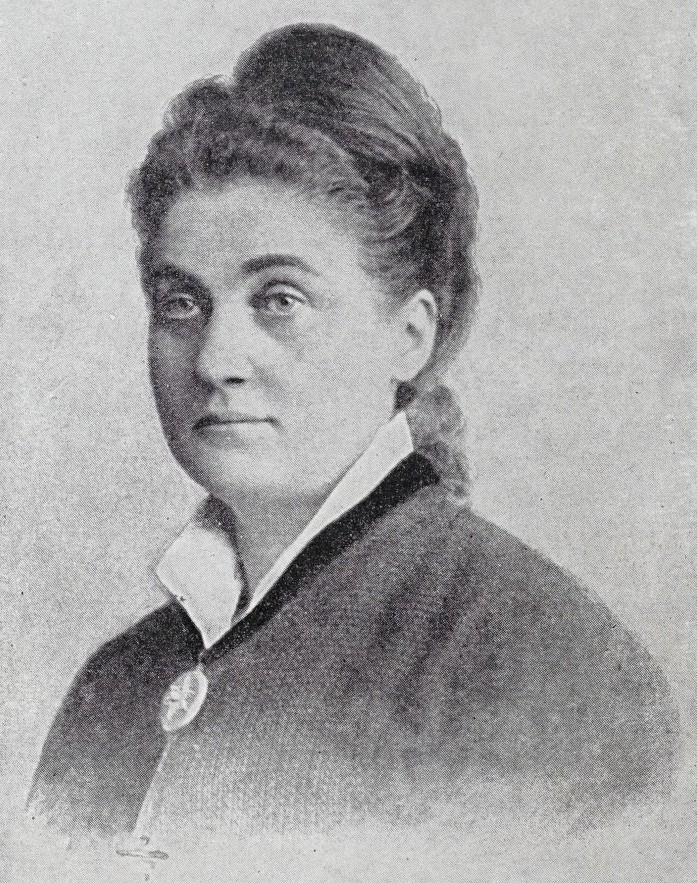
The writer Emmy von Rhoden (1829-1885)

Emilie Auguste Karoline Henriette Friedrich-Friedrich née Kühne (November 15, 1829 in Magdeburg – April 7, 1885 in Dresden), known by the pen name Emmy von Rhoden, was a German writer. She is best known for her novel Der Trotzkopf (1885), one of the prototypes of the Backfischroman. It is considered an international classic of Children's literature. She is the mother of writer Else Wildhagen who continued the Trotzkopf-series with two sequels. The last official volume was written by the unrelated Dutch writer Suze la Chapelle-Roobol and translated into German. The series was a huge commercial success in Germany and translated into at least 11 different languages. The success was also due to the marketing effort of the publisher Gustav Weise in Stuttgart.

The English translation by Felix Leopold Oswald has been heavily adapted to the American context.

== Works ==
- Das Musikantenkind, 1883
- Lenchen Braun, 1883
- Der Trotzkopf, 1885
  - Translated into English as Taming a Tomboy (1898) by Felix Leopold Oswald, and as An Obstinate Maid (1898) by Mary E. Ireland.
