= Backfischroman =

The Backfischroman (teenage girl novel, literal meaning: baked fish novel) is a genre in German literature. It denotes a particular type of novel of the 19th and early 20th century, primarily aiming at adolescent girls as an audience.

In the 19th century, the now antiquated word Backfisch was a common term to describe girls between the ages 13 and 16 or more general during puberty. The exact origin of the term is not known. Most likely it was taken from the identical word used by fishermen to describe small young fish in a catch, which were of less use. For the origin of this use, different explanations are offered in literature. One states that it is derived from the English word back, because those fish were often thrown back into the water. Another states an alternative literal meaning as baked fish and states that traditionally in cooking such small fish were only prepared by baking since they were considered not large enough for boiled or fried dishes.

The Backfischroman is usually told from a first-person perspective, with the main character being an adolescent girl of middle or higher class upbringing. She tends to be an open and friendly person, who pursues her own interests independently of society's norms and later after a learning process makes her own free decision to accept the role for a woman as wife and mother. Typical well known examples are Emmy von Rhoden's Der Trotzkopf (1885) and Clementine Helm's Backfischchens Leiden und Freuden (1863). Later examples like Else Ury's Nesthäckchen allow a bit more room and different topics for the female protagonist, being not quite as restrictive as before. This is due to changing attitudes from the Wilhelmine period (1871–1918) to the Weimar period (1918–1933). The terms Backfischroman and Backfischliteratur are not applied to girl literature from the middle of the 20th century onwards, which features an expanded range of topics and is less focused on traditional roles for women.

== Translations ==
Der Trotzkopf has been translated into English twice, once under the title An Obstinate Maid (1898) by Mary E. Ireland and once as Taming a Tomboy (1898), likely by the Belgian-born naturalist and free-thought advocate Felix Leopold Oswald.
