= Heinrich Ernst Beyrich =

German paleontologist (1815–1896)

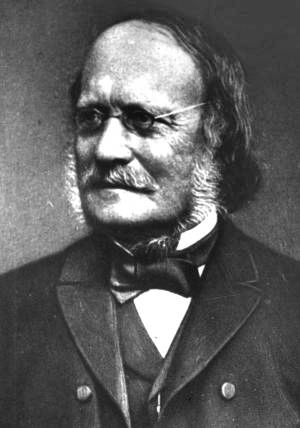
Heinrich Ernst Beyrich.

Heinrich Ernst Beyrich (31 August 1815 – 9 July 1896) was a German palaeontologist.

== Life ==
Born in Berlin, he was educated at the university in that city, and afterwards at Bonn, where he studied under Georg August Goldfuss and Johann Jakob Nöggerath. He obtained his degree of Ph.D. in 1837 at Berlin, and was subsequently employed in the Mineralogical Museum of the university, becoming director of the palaeontological collection in 1857, and director of the museum in 1875.

In 1848 Ernst Beyrich married Clementine Helm, who later became famous as author of numerous books for children and Young adult fiction. Clementine was the niece of his professor Christian Samuel Weiss. The couple had no children of their own, but adopted Clementine's two nieces, after the death of her sister in 1851.

He was one of the founders of the German Geological Society in 1848. He early recognized the value of palaeontology in stratigraphical work, and conducted important research in the Rhenish mountains and in the Harz and Alpine districts. In later years he gave special attention to the Cenozoic strata, including the Brown coal of North Germany.

In 1854 he proposed the term Oligocene for certain Tertiary strata (now Paleogene) intermediate between the Eocene and Miocene, a term that has now been officially adopted. In 1865 he was appointed professor of geology and palaeontology at Berlin University, where he was eminently successful as a teacher. When the Prussian Geological Survey was instituted in 1873, he was appointed co-director with Wilhelm Hauchecorne (1828-1900). He published Beitragezur Kenntniss der Versteinerun gen des rheinischen Ubergangs-gebirges (1837); Uber einige hohmische Trilobiten (1845); Die Conchylien des norddeutschen Tertiargebirges (1853-1857). He was elected a Foreign Honorary Member of the American Academy of Arts and Sciences in 1884. He died in July 1896.
