= Friedrich Eggers =

German art historian

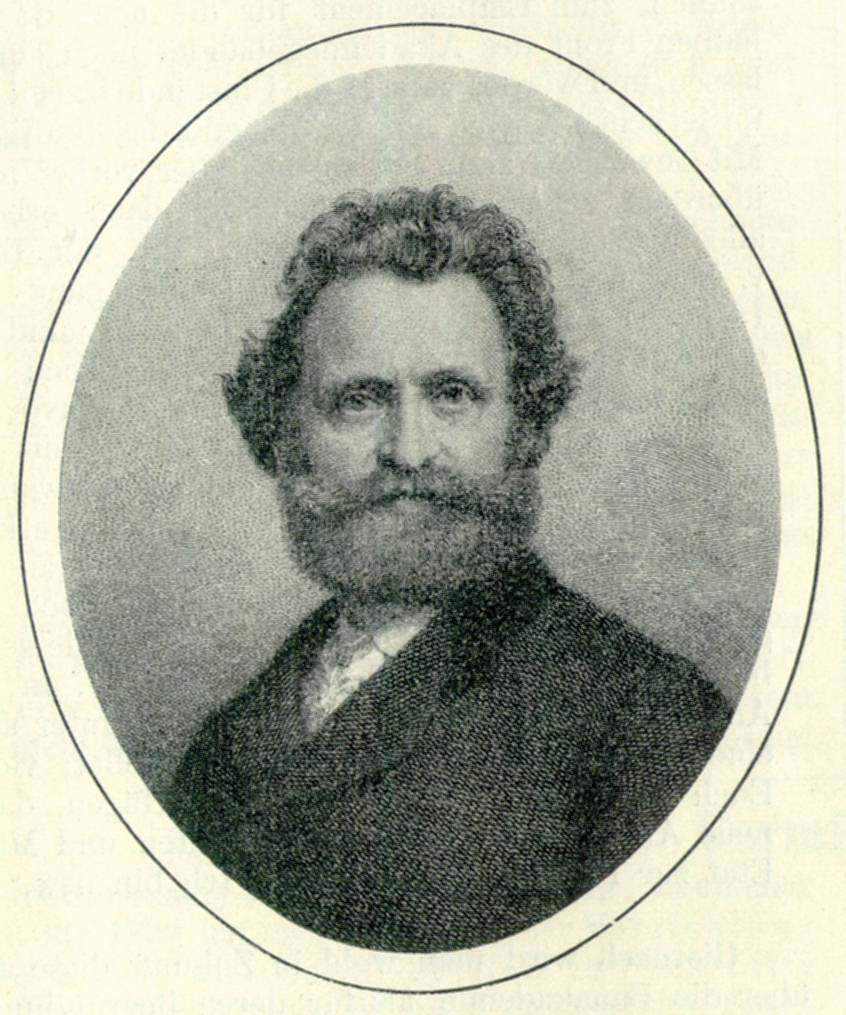
Friedrich Eggers; from the Centralblatt der Bauverwaltung (1899)

Hartwig Karl Friedrich Eggers (27 November 1819 in Rostock – 11 August 1872 in Berlin) was a German art historian. He was a member of the literary groups Tunnel über der Spree and Rütli.

== Biography ==
His father, Christian Friedrich Eggers (1788–1858), sold building materials. After completing his primary education, he followed his father into the trade. His first literary efforts date from these years. Later, from 1839 to 1841, he took private preparatory lessons for graduate school and, in 1842, was admitted to the University of Rostock, where he studied philology. After only a short time there, he moved to Leipzig to engage in historical studies with Wilhelm Wachsmuth. Another move took him to Munich to study classical archaeology. He returned to Rostock in 1844.

After receiving his doctorate in 1848, he moved to Berlin. There, he made the acquaintance of the historian, Franz Theodor Kugler, who commissioned him to prepare a report on the reorganization of the Prussian art administration process. Kugler also introduced him to the literary society "Tunnel über der Spree".

In early 1849, he was hired to the editorial board of the Mecklenburgische Zeitung, but returned to Berlin in 1850 and was instrumental in founding the Deutsches Kunstblatt (Art Sheet). He served as editor until 1854, when he became a member of the literary group, Rütli. In 1857, he was presented with the "Schlossmedaille" (Castle Medal), a one-time award given by Frederick Francis II, Grand Duke of Mecklenburg-Schwerin, to those who had contributed to the construction of Schwerin Palace. Eggers had composed inscriptions honoring the Duchy's previous rulers.

In 1863, he received an appointment as a teacher of art history at Berlin University of the Arts and was named a Professor later that year. He also employed his earlier professional skills to teach at the Bauakademie and pursued his literary ambitions, but remained largely unknown. It was then that he began what became his best known work; a five volume biography of the sculptor Christian Daniel Rauch, but he died before it was finished. It would be completed by his brother, Karl Eggers.

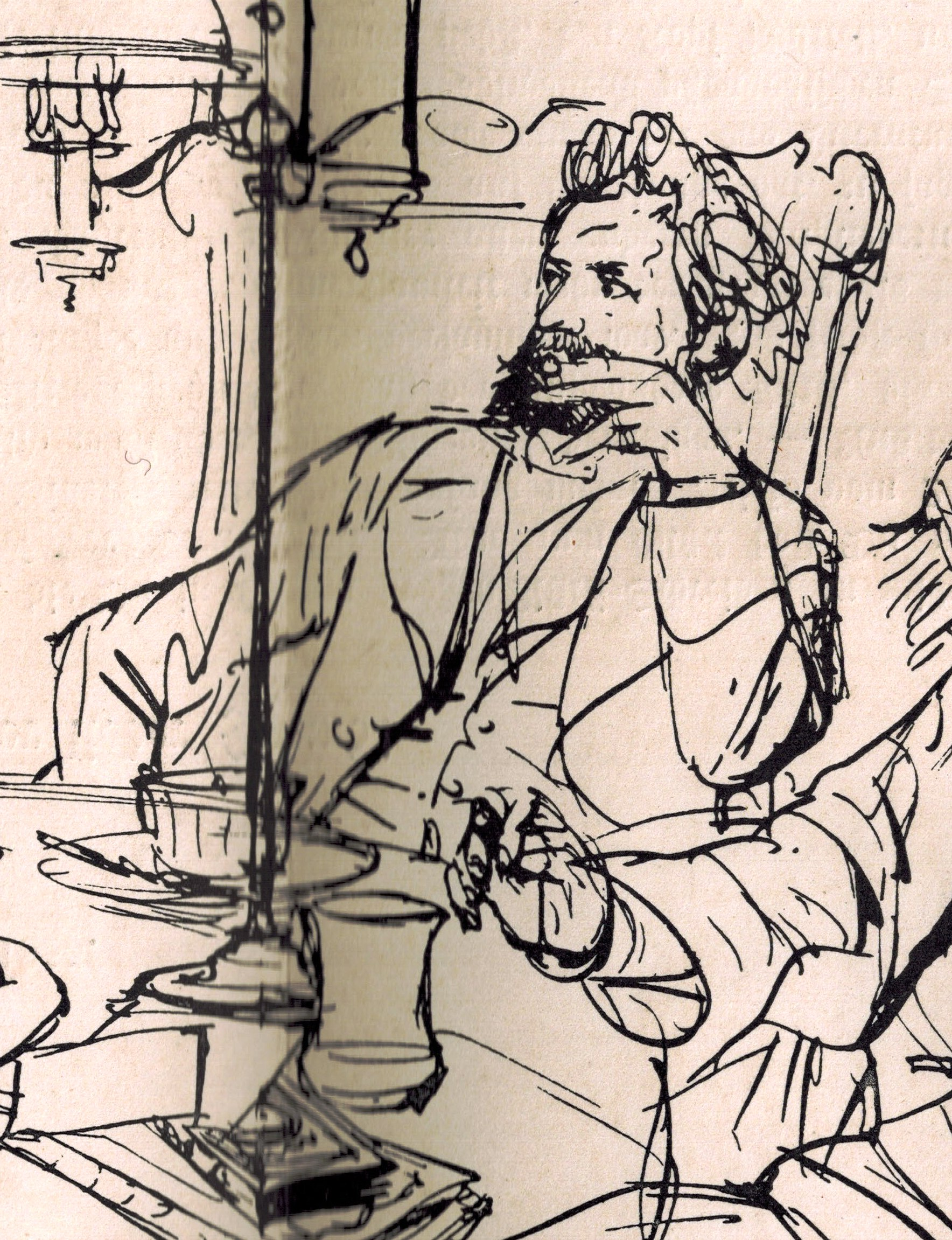
Eggers at Tunnel über der Spree, drawing by Adolph von Menzel

In 1871, he was engaged by the Prussian Ministry of Culture, where he was involved with the fine arts. The following year, he died after a short illness and was buried in Rostock. In 1874, a complete collection of his poetry was published in Breslau. A smaller selection had been published in 1851 by his friend, the poet and philosopher, Otto Friedrich Gruppe.

It is generally believed that another friend, Adolf von Wilbrandt, took him as the model for the bisexual character "Fridolin" in his novel Fridolins heimliche Ehe (Fridolin's Secret Marriage), which was published in 1875 in Vienna. This was first suggested by the writer, Theodor Fontane, who had worked with Eggers at the Ministry of Culture.

== Works ==
- (Co-editor) Argo. Album für Kunst und Dichtung. Breslau: (Jg. 1857:) Trewendt u. Granier; Trewendt, 1857–1860. Online @ the University and State Library Düsseldorf
- Friedrich Eggers: Gedichte. Mit dem Bildn. d. Dichters. (edited by Karl Eggers), Hoffmann, Breslau 1874.
- Friedrich Eggers (Ed.): Deutsches Kunstblatt – Online
- Friedrich Eggers: Christian Daniel Rauch. Berlin: Duncker, 1873–1891. 5 vols. (Onlinet @ the Digitalen Bibliothek Mecklenburg-Vorpommern)

== Letters ==
- Theodor Fontane und Friedrich Eggers. Der Briefwechsel. Mit Briefen an Karl Eggers u. der Korrespondenz von Friedrich Eggers mit Emilie Fontane. Edited by Roland Berbig. Walter de Gruyter, Berlin/New York 1997, ISBN 3-11-014987-7
