= Ernst Dircksen =

German architect (1831–1899)

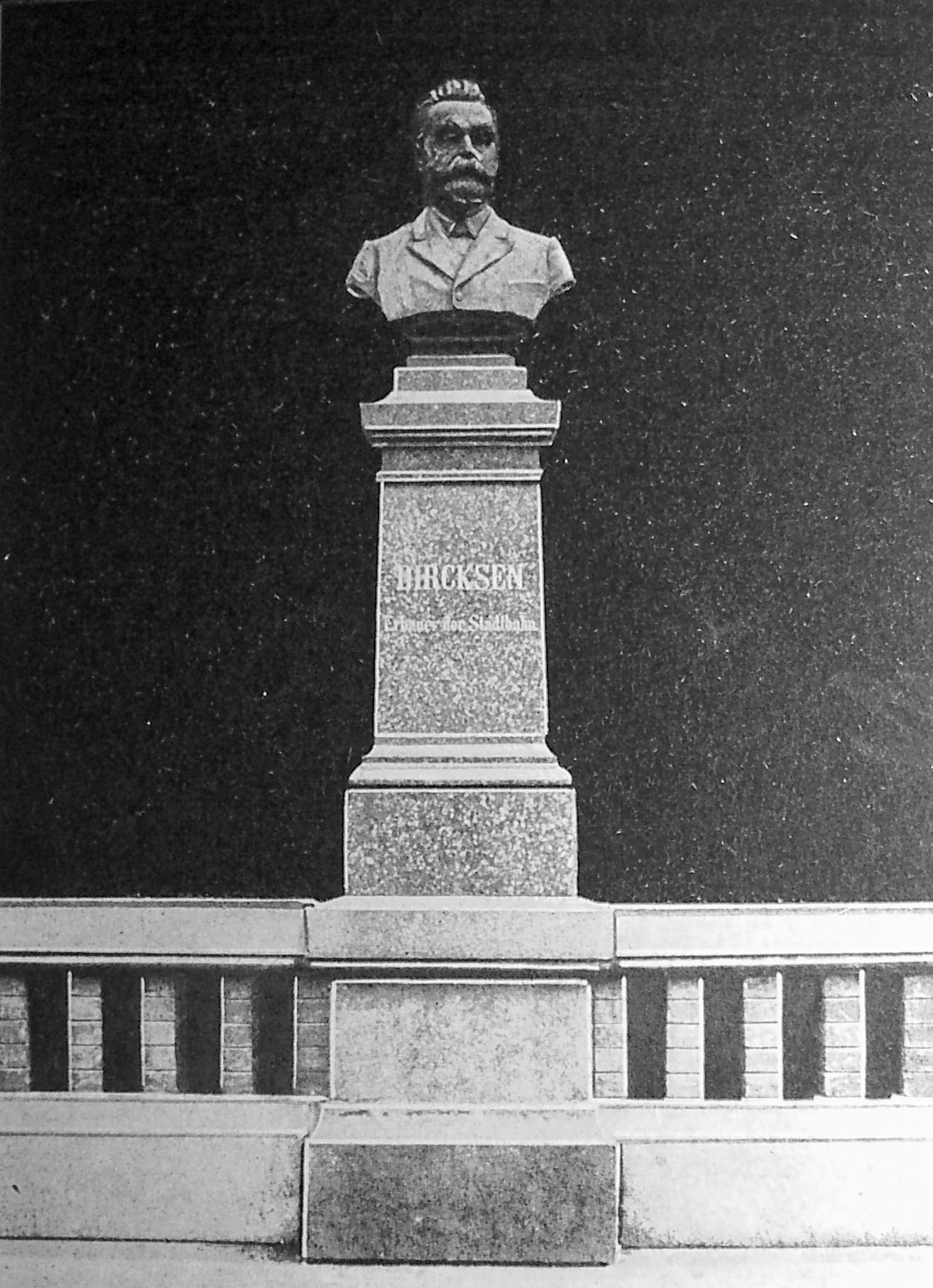
Ernst Dircksen

Ernst August Dircksen (31 May 1831 in Danzig – 11 May 1899 in Erfurt) was a German architect.

== Life ==
Ernst Dircksen studied at the Berlin Bauakademie. In 1867, he relocated to Upper Silesia and soon became an expert for building railway bridges and railway lines. In 1882, Dircksen was sent to Cologne to redesign and expand the railway lines there; in 1890 he relocated to Erfurt.

In 1902, a memorial for Dircksen, made by Ludwig Brunow, was erected near the station Friedrichstraße in Berlin. The memorial was later destroyed.

== Works ==
- Bridge at Dirschau across the Weichsel
- Bridge over the Rhine in Cologne
- Station in Frankfurt (Oder)
- Berlin Ringbahn
- Rail line from Remilly to Pont-à-Mousson
- Railway lines for the Bergisch-Märkische Eisenbahn Gesellschaft
- Planning and site management for the Berlin Stadtbahn
- Multiple railway lines in the Cologne area
- New lines around Erfurt
