= Heinrich Seidel =

German engineer, poet and writer

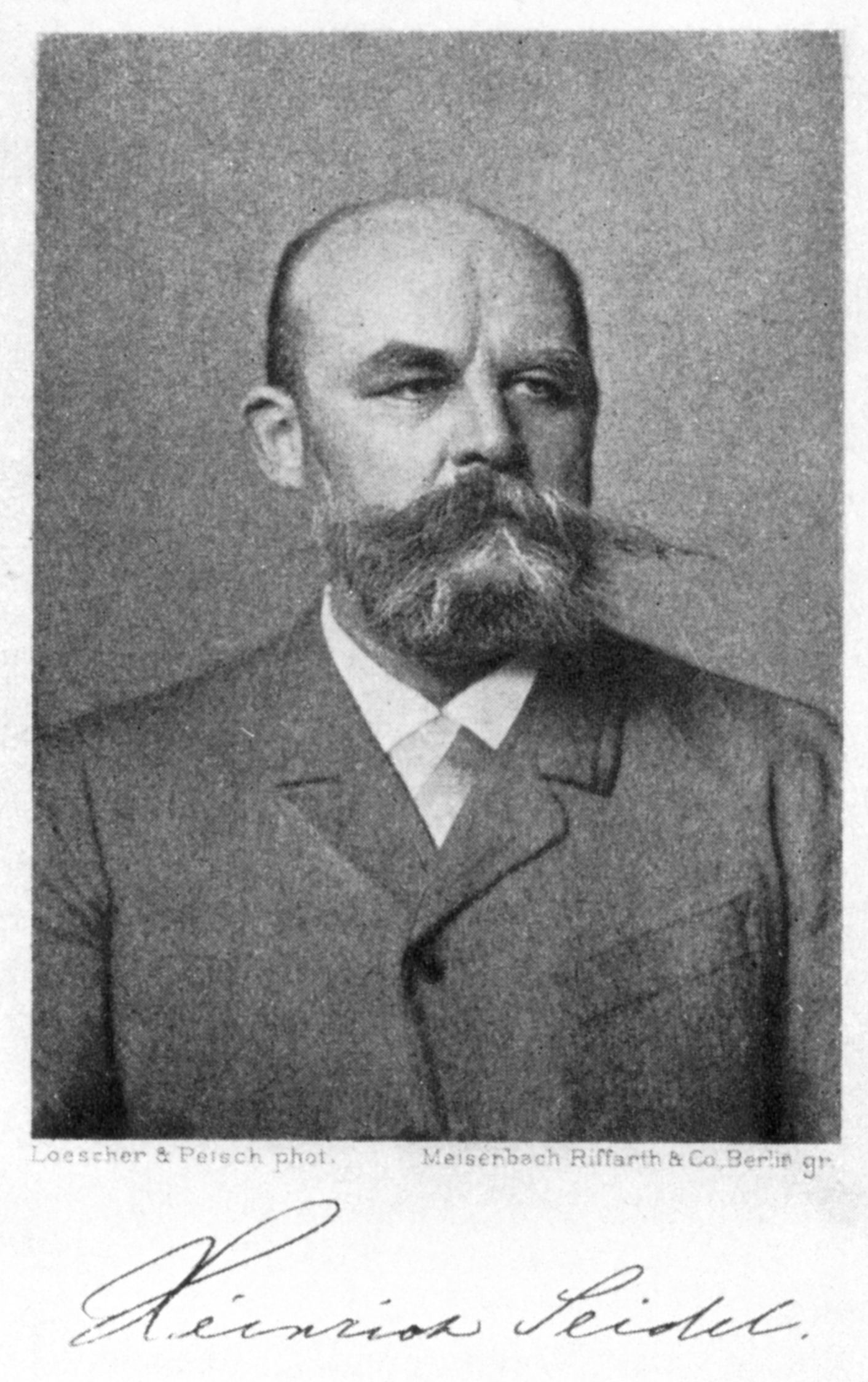
Heinrich Seidel (around 1890)

Heinrich Friedrich Wilhelm Seidel (25 June 1842, Perlin, Mecklenburg-Schwerin – 7 November 1906, Berlin) was a German engineer, poet and writer.

== Life ==
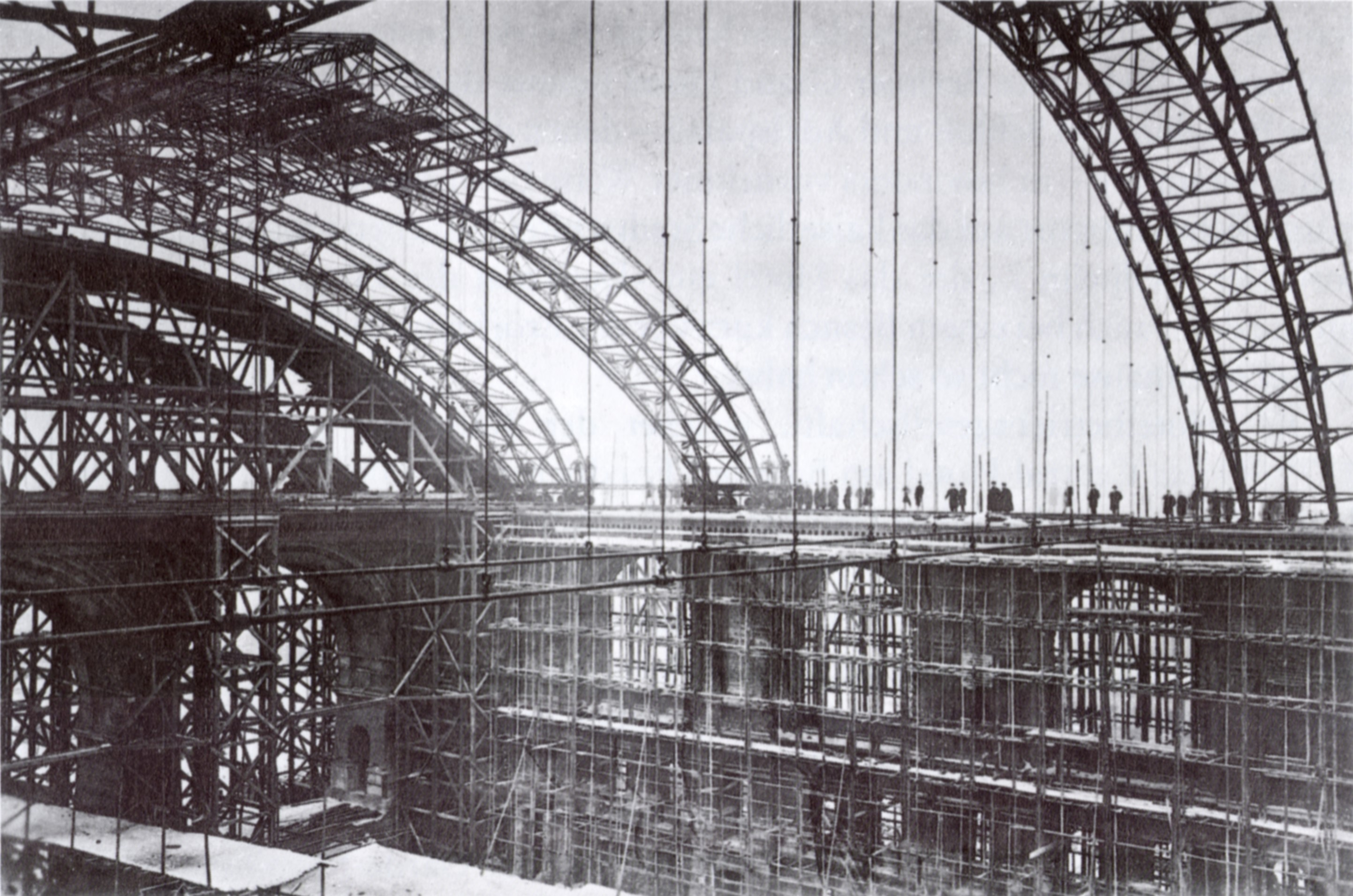
Anhalter Bahnhof hall roof construction works (around 1878)

Seidel was the son of a pastor and studied in the Polytechnikum in Hannover from 1860 to 1862 and in the Gewerbeakademie in Berlin, becoming an engineer. Beginning in 1866 he participated in the construction of the Anhalter Bahnhof railway station in Berlin, where he was the first to achieve the construction of its main hall roof with a free span of 62,5 m. However, in 1880 he gave up the profession to dedicate himself to writing the children's stories and fairy tales for which he is chiefly remembered today.

In Berlin, Heinrich Seidel became a member of the Hütte Academic Association "A.V. Hütte" and the literary society Tunnel über der Spree. Under the pseudonym Johannes Köhnke he collaborated with Julius Stinde (pseudonym Theophil Ballheim), Johannes Trojan and others in the Allgemeiner Deutscher Reimverein (ADR), where he demonstrated his skill as a Reimakrobat (rhyme acrobat).

The famous catchphrase "Dem Ingenieur ist nichts zu schwer" (to an engineer nothing is too difficult) was his personal motto and the first line of his writing Ingenieurlied (Song of an Engineer).

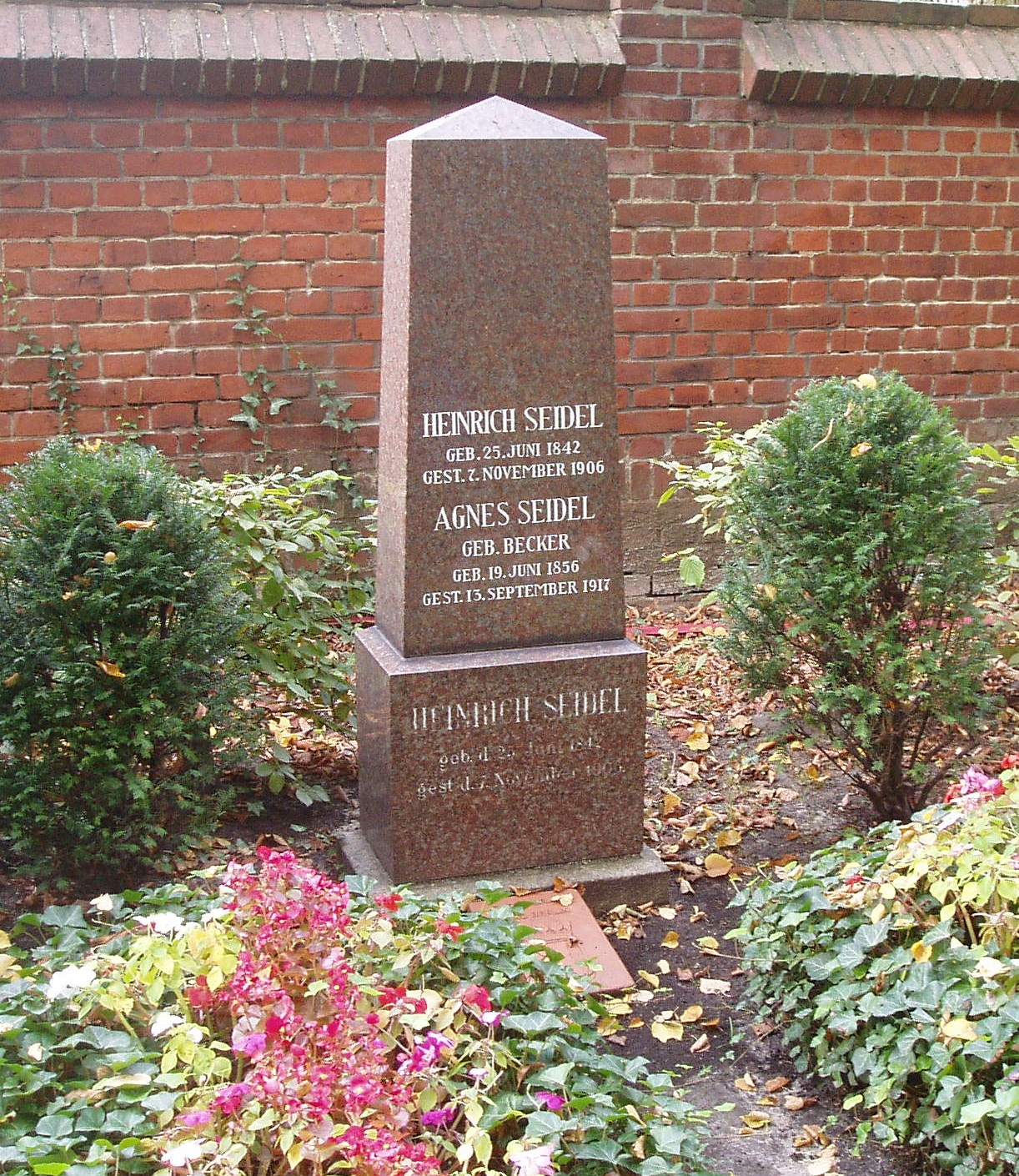
Heinrich Seidel's tomb cemetery Berlin-Lichterfelde (2006)

He is interred at the Berlin's Lichterfelde cemetery.

== Works ==
- Aus der Heimat, Novellen, 1874
- Vorstadtgeschichten, 1880
- Leberecht Hühnchen, Jorinde und andere Geschichten, 1882
- Im Jahre 1984, 1884
- Neues von Leberecht Hühnchen und anderen Sonderlingen, 1888
- Natursänger, 1888
- Leberecht Hühnchen als Großvater, 1890
- Sonderbare Geschichten, 1891
- Von Perlin nach Berlin, Lebenserinnerungen, 1894 (new edition 2006)
- Glockenspiel, VII.Band Gesammelte Schriften, 1897
- Wintermärchen, XVI.Band Gesammelte Schriften, 1901
- Leberecht Hühnchen (Gesamtausgabe), 1901
- Heimatgeschichten (Gesamtausgabe), 1902
- Reinhard Flemmings Abenteuer zu Wasser und zu Lande (3 Bde.), 1900–1906
- Ingenieurlied
