= Sophie Pataky =

Austrian bibliographer (1860–1915)

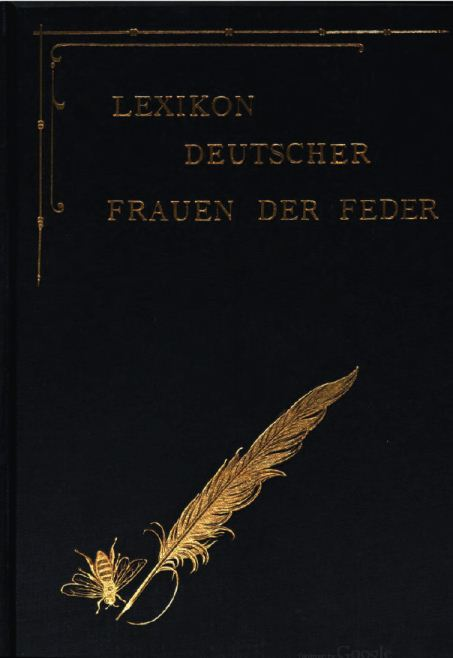
Cover of Lexikon deutscher Frauen der Feder

Sophie Caroline Pataky (née Stipek; 5 April 1860 – 24 January 1915) was an Austrian bibliographer. Her two-volume Lexikon deutscher Frauen der Feder (Dictionary of German Women of the Pen), published in 1898, was the first German-language encyclopedia of women writers edited by a woman.

== Production of encyclopedia ==
Born in Podiebrad, Austrian Empire, Pataky was married to Carl Pataky and engineer and patent attorney(1844-1914). He had founded a specialist publishing house for metal technology in Vienna in 1875, where Pataky collaborated alongside her "family duties." The couple moved to Berlin in the late 1870s or early 1880s.

Initially, Pataky had no connections to the feminist movement, but did attend the International Women's Congress at the Berlin Town Hall in the summer of 1896. As a result, she became interested in women's issues and began researching literature by and for women. At that time, the most recent encyclopedia was Carl Wilhelm Otto August von Schindel's work Die deutschen Schriftstellerinnen des neunzehnten Jahrhunderts, which had been published in the 1820s. The lack of a sequel, or another comprehensive work or encyclopedia on nineteenth-century women writers, prompted Pataky to contact women writers herself, collecting biographies of women writers since 1840 and eventually publishing them in the two-volume work Lexikon deutscher Frauen der Feder. Both volumes were published in 1898 by Pataky’s publishing house. However, that business specialized in metal technology and the encyclopedia was moved to the publishing house of Schuster & Loeffler in 1899.

== Name of encyclopedia ==
Pataky originally planned to publish the books under the title Lexikon deutscher Schriftstellerinnen (Encyclopedia of German Women Writers), but changed the title when numerous women writers refused to contribute because they did not see themselves as writers. Pataky's aim was "to present women writers in general, regardless of the form in which they express their intellectual activity with the pen." In total, Pataky named 6000 female authors, with a large number represented exclusively by their address. By including cookbook authors, journalists, and editors among others, she provided a more comprehensive picture of women writers than, for example, Franz Brümmer, who published at the same time.

Around 1898, Pataky was a board member of the German Women Writers' Association. At this time, and further to her encyclopedia project, she began to compile a library of works by German-speaking women authors. She had the authors presented in Deutsche Frauen der Feder send her their own works, which were then collected in the Bibliothek deutscher Frauenwerke. By 1898, Pataky had already collected over 1,000 books. In this context, a dispute with the author Anna von Krane was recorded, the author accused Pataky of wanting to enrich himself with the books. The correspondence with Krane, together with a few manuscripts of the project, have survived in the Archive of the German Women's Movement in Kassel.

== Later life ==
Pataky and her husband lived in Merano from 1907, where they acquired, and lived in the Villa Steffihof in Untermais. In the same year, Carl Pataky took K. J. Müller into his publishing house as a silent partner. Müller took over the publishing house after Carl Pataky died on 11 August 1914 during a holiday in Bad Reichenhall.

Sophie Pataky died of a cerebral stroke at her home in Untermais on January 24, 1915, and was buried in the local Catholic cemetery on January 26. In her will she bequeathed 20,000 crowns to the Municipal Sanatorium in Merano and the Maiser Versorgungshaus 10,000 Kronen. Data on further book projects are not known.

== Publications ==
- Lexikon deutscher Frauen der Feder. Eine Zusammenstellung der seit dem Jahre 1840 erschienenen Werke weiblicher Autoren, nebst Biographieen der lebenden und einem Verzeichnis der Pseudonyme. Herausgegeben von Sophie Pataky. Carl Pataky, Berlin 1898
  - 1. vol: A-L
  - 2. vol: M-Z

Numerized:

- Scans at literature.at: Band 1, Vol. 2
- Scan from Google Books in Internet Archive: Vol. 1, Band 2
- E-Text at zeno.org: Startseite
