= Otto Roquette =

German author (1824-1896)

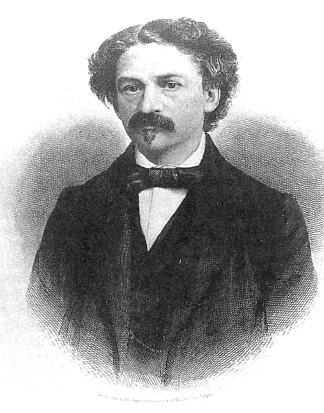

Otto Roquette (April 19, 1824 – March 18, 1896) was a German author.

== Life and work ==
Roquette was born in Krotoschin, Prussian Province of Posen. The son of a district court councillor, he first went to Bromberg (modern Bydgoszcz) in 1834, and from 1846 to 1850 studied Philology and History in Heidelberg, Berlin, and Halle. After tours in Switzerland and Italy, he moved to in Berlin in 1852. He became a teacher in Dresden in 1853. He returned to Berlin in 1857 and in 1862 became a professor of literary history at the War Academy until he changed to the Gewerbeakademie (now Technische Universität Berlin) in 1867. In 1868 he joined the Vandalia-Teutonia Berlin. From 1869 he taught at the Polytechnic in Darmstadt (now Technische Universität Darmstadt). In 1893 he was named to the Geheimrat. Roquette befriended the German author Paul Heyse and, like Heyse, was a member of the literary group "Rütli".

Roquette's pseudo-romantic and epigonic lyric poetry and his fairy tale-laden epic verse is representative of Butzenscheibenlyric. From 1850 on, his works were extremely popular and especially beloved in conservative circles. His fashionable post-revolution poetry was a deliberate departure from the politically tinged verse of the pre-March era. His celebrated verse-epic on themes of love, wine, and youth, Waldmeisters Brautfahrt, first appeared in 1851 and enjoyed sensational success for a book at that time – appearing in more than 50 editions over thirty years.

Roquette's work was popular with some Lieder composers, such as Pauline Volkstein. His 1851 poem Noch ist die blühende, goldene Zeit was fit to a well-known folk tune in 1863 by the musician Wilhelm Baumgartner. Roquette was also a novelist, playwright, literary historian and autobiographer

Roquette died in Darmstadt. Later generations found Roquette's work to be predominantly shallow and of little artistic value, and it is virtually forgotten today.

== Works ==
- 1850: Walpurgis
- 1851: Orion
- 1851: Waldmeisters Brautfahrt (Verse-Epic)
- 1852: Liederbuch (under the title "Poems" 1859)
- 1852: Der Tag von St. Jakob
- 1853: Das Reich der Träume
- 1854: Herr Heinrich
- 1855: Haus Haidekuckuck (Verse-Epic)
- 1855: Das Hünengrab
- 1858: Heinrich Falk (Novel)
- 1959: Erzählungen
- 1860: Leben und Dichten Johann Christian Günther's (Scholarly work, biography)
- 1862: Neue Erzählungen
- 1864: Susanne
- 1866: Die Legende von der heiligen Elisabeth (Libretto to an Oratorio by Franz Liszt)
- 1867: Luginsland
- 1867: Pierrot
- 1867–76: Dramatische Dichtungen
- 1868: Krachmost
- 1869: Das Paradies
- 1870: Novellen
- 1871–75: Welt und Haus (Novella)
- 1873: Gevatter Tod
- 1873: Rhampsinit
- 1873: Die Schlangenkönigin
- 1877: Euphrosyne (Novel)
- 1878: Das Buchstabirbuch der Leidenschaft (Novel)
- 1878: Im Hause der Väter (Novel)
- 1879: Geschichte der Deutschen Dichtung von den ältesten Denkmälern bis auf die Neuzeit (Scholarly work, literary History)
- 1879: Die Prophetenschule (Novel)
- 1883: Friedrich Preller
- 1884: Neues Novellenbuch
- 1884: Das Haus Eberhard
- 1884: Unterwegs
- 1884: Tage des Waldlebens
- 1884: Baum im Odenwald
- 1887: Große und kleine Leute in Alt-Weimar
- 1890: Frühlingsstimmen
- 1890: Des Lebens Mummenschanz
- 1892: Ul von Haslach
- 1894: Siebzig Jahre (Autobiography)
- 1895: Sonderlinge
- 1896: Krethi und Plethi
- 1896: Von Tag zu Tage (posthumous)
