= Tunnel über der Spree =

German literary society

Tunnel über der Spree was a German literary society based in Berlin, founded on 3 December 1827 by Moritz Gottlieb Saphir. Most active between 1840 and 1860, it acquired 214 members and influenced literary life in Berlin for more than seventy years.

Saphir had been denied membership of Julius Eduard Hitzig's new Wednesday Society. He invited the actors Friedrich Wilhelm Lemm and Ludwig Schneider to his home and founded a "Sunday Society" to compete with it. Its motto was Ungeheure Ironie und unendliche Wehmut and its mascot was Till Eulenspiegel.

To avoid confusion with fanclubs of the singer Henriette Sontag, the name was changed to "Tunnel over the Spree," a topical reference to Isambard Kingdom Brunel's tunnel under the Thames, which would lead to an abortive effort to create a similar tunnel in Berlin. In fact, the first Berlin tunnel did not open until 1899, the year after the demise of the society. Theodor Fontane, an important source of information on the society, once remarked that Saphir's only real intention was to create a kind of personal bodyguard for himself. Another member, Emanuel Geibel, described it as a "daycare centre for smalltime authors" (Kleindichterbewahranstalt).

The board consisted of a president, vice-president and secretary, and elections were held on 1 May and 1 November each year. Members met on Sunday afternoons in a cafe near St Hedwig's Cathedral in Unter den Linden, and presented their most recent unpublished creative efforts—usually poems, but occasionally music or even paintings. Membership was by invitation after three attendances as a guest; the new member had to select a pseudonym, which had to be the name of a famous deceased individual of the same profession. Although the purpose of the pseudonym was to help erase class distinctions, its membership consisted almost entirely of officers, aristocrats, and professional men: no women were permitted at meetings, and its formalities made its atmosphere very different from that of the salons which had preceded it.

The last minuted meeting took place on 30 October 1898. After the death in 1911 of the last president, Oscar Roloff, the society's archives were donated to Humboldt University in Berlin. Theodor Fontane vividly described the society's activities in his memoir Von Zwanzig bis Dreißig.

== See also ==
- Rütli (literary group)

== Bibliography ==
- Fritz Behrend: Geschichte des „Tunnels über der Spree“, Wendt, Berlin 1938
- Roland Berbig: Der Tunnel über der Spree. Ein literarischer Verein in seinem Öffentlichkeitsverhalten, in: Fontane-Blätter, 16. Jg. (1990), H. 50, S. 18–46
- Karin Bruns u.a.: Forschungsprojekt „Literarisch-kulturelle Vereine, Gruppen und Bünde im 19. und frühen 20. Jahrhundert“. Entwicklung, Aspekte, Schwerpunkte, in: Zeitschrift für Germanistik, Lang, Berlin 1994, H. 3, S. 493–505
- Karin Hannusch: Zur Mitgliedersoziologie des Literarischen Sonntagsvereins „Tunnel über der Spree“, in: Fontane-Blätter, 17. Jg. (1991), H. 51, S. 55–58
- Ernst Kohler: Die Balladendichtung im Berliner „Tunnel über der Spree“, Kraus, Nendeln, 1969 (Repr. d. Ausg. Berlin 1940)
- Joachim Krueger: Der Tunnel über Spree und sein Einfluß auf Theodor Fontane, in: Fontane-Blätter, 4. Jg. (1978), H. 3, S. 201–225
- Elke-Barbara Peschke, Ralf Golling: Ungeahnter Knotenpunkt eines Netzwerkes von Personen und Ideen. Erschließung des Vereinsarchivs „Tunnel über der Spree“. Beiträge von der Tagung in der Universitätsbibliothek der Humboldt-Universität zu Berlin am 9. Oktober 1998. Berlin: Humboldt-Univ., 1999 (Schriftenreihe der Universitätsbibliothek der Humboldt-Universität zu Berlin; 61), urn:nbn:de:kobv:11-100101938 (PDF)
- Anike Rössig: Juden und andere Tunnelianer. Gesellschaft und Literatur im Berliner Sonntags-Verein. Heidelberg 2008.
- Wulf Wülfing: Art. Tunnel über der Spree. In: Wulf Wülfing / Karin Bruns / Rolf Parr (Hg.): Handbuch literarisch-kultureller Vereine, Gruppen und Bünde 1825-1933 (Repertorien zur Deutschen Literaturgeschichte 18), Metzler, Stuttgart / Weimar 1998, S. 430-455 (dort weiterführende Lit.), ISBN 3-476-01336-7
