= Weiden Zentrum station =

Railway and bus station in Cologne, Germany

Coordinates: 50°56′17″N 6°50′6″E

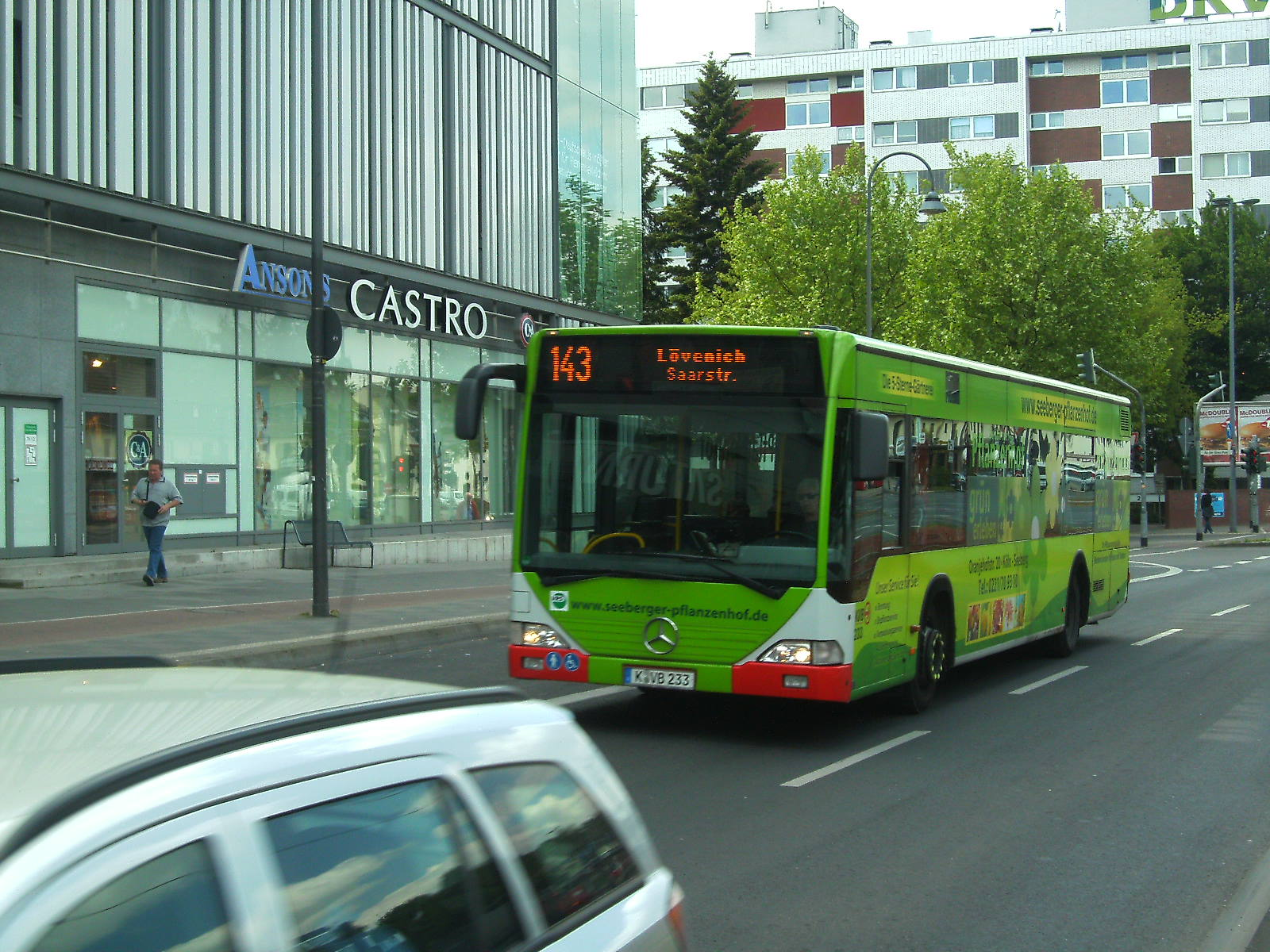
The bus stop

Weiden Zentrum is a Kölner Verkehrs-Betriebe station. Line 1 of the Stadtbahn serves this station. The station is also served by buses, and buses on routes 141 and 149 terminate at the station.

Preceding station	Cologne Stadtbahn	Following station
Weiden Römergrab towards Köln-Weiden West	Line 1	Bahnstraße towards Bensberg

== See also ==
- List of Cologne KVB stations
