= Weiden Römergrab station =

Railway station in Germany

Coordinates: 50°56′18″N 6°49′43″E

Weiden Römergrab
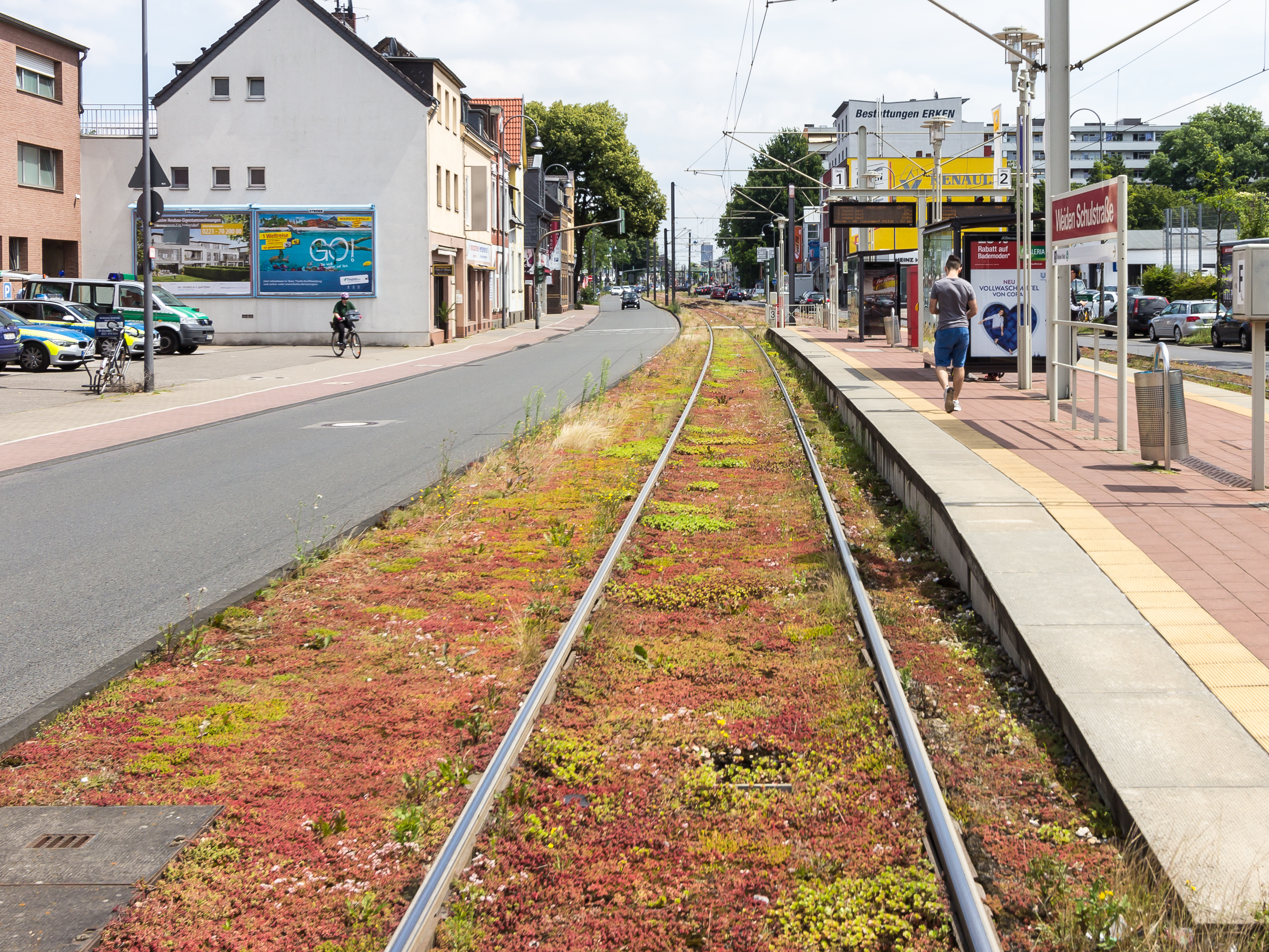

General information
- Owner: Stadtwerke Köln
- Operator: KVB

Other information
- Fare zone: VRS: 2100

Services
Preceding station	Cologne Stadtbahn	Following station
Köln-Weiden West Terminus	Line 1	Weiden Zentrum towards Bensberg
Location
- Location within North Rhine-Westphalia Location within Germany Location within Europe

Weiden Römergrab is a Cologne Stadtbahn station served by line 1 and located on Aachener Straße in the district of Köln-Weiden.

The station was renamed on December, 15th 2019 from Weiden Schulstraße to Weiden Römergrab.

== See also ==
- List of Cologne KVB stations
