= Düsseldorf Zoo station =

Railway station in Düsseldorf, Germany

Düsseldorf Zoo
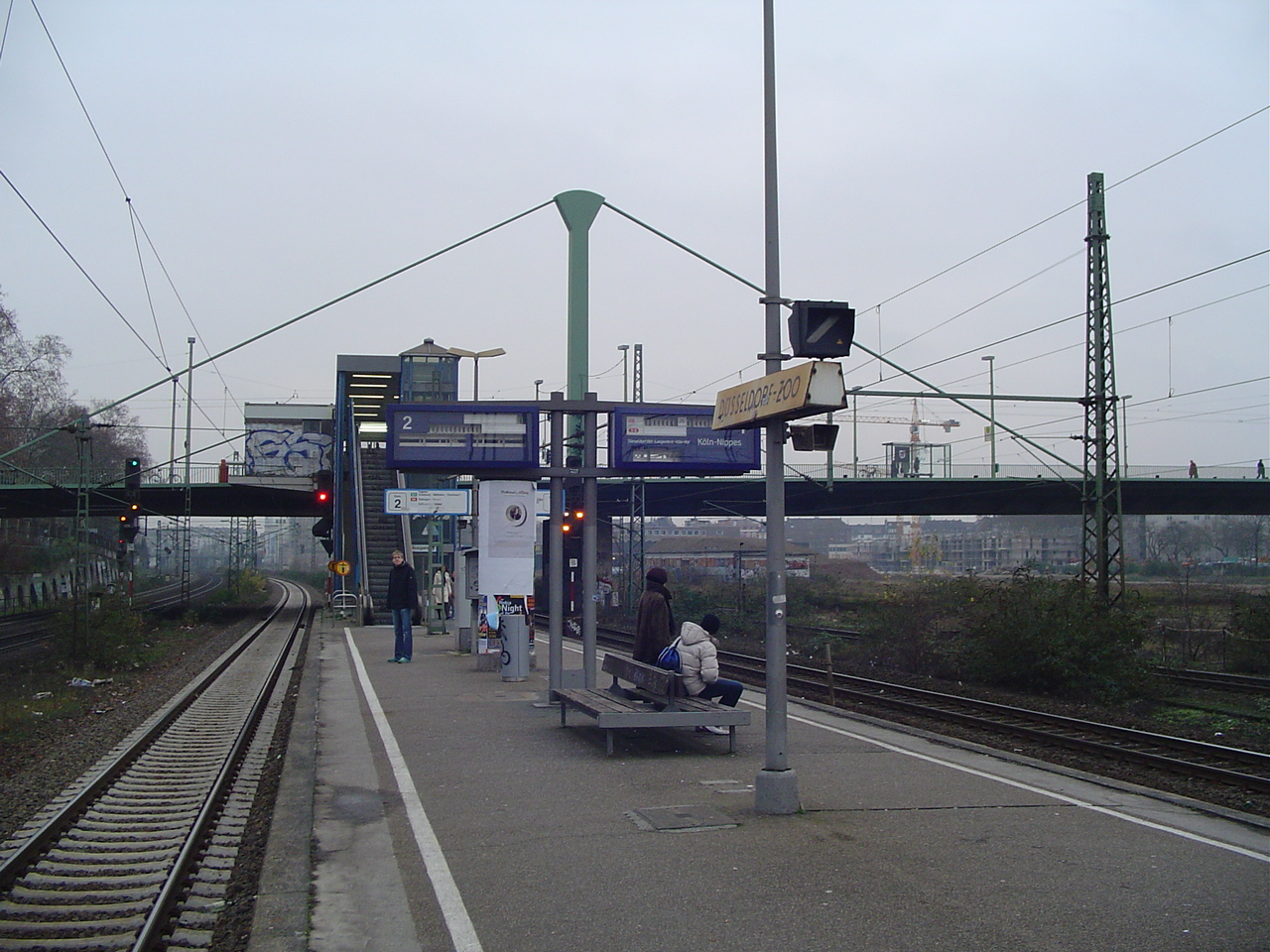

General information
- Location: Düsseldorf, NRW; Germany
- Coordinates: 51°14′11.3″N 6°47′48.9″E
- Owner: Deutsche Bahn
- Operator: DB Netz; DB Station&Service
- Lines: Cologne–Duisburg (KBS 415); Düsseldorf–Essen
- Platforms: 2

Construction
- Accessible: Yes

Other information
- Station code: 1404
- DS100 code: KDZ
- Category: 4
- Fare zone: VRR: 430; VRS: 1430 (VRR transitional zone)
- Website: www.bahnhof.de

History
- Opened: 1969

Services
Preceding station	Rhine-Ruhr S-Bahn	Following station
Düsseldorf Wehrhahn towards Solingen Hbf	S1	Düsseldorf-Derendorf towards Dortmund Hbf
Düsseldorf Wehrhahn towards Köln-Nippes	S6	Düsseldorf-Derendorf towards Essen Hbf
Preceding station	Cologne S-Bahn	Following station
Düsseldorf Wehrhahn towards Bergisch Gladbach	S11	Düsseldorf-Derendorf towards Düsseldorf Airport Terminal
Location

Düsseldorf Zoo station is located about two kilometres north of Düsseldorf Hauptbahnhof in central Düsseldorf in the German state of North Rhine-Westphalia. It is on the Cologne–Duisburg line and is classified by Deutsche Bahn as a category 4 station. The station is defined by Deutsche Bahn as a Haltepunkt (roughly "halt") as it is not a junction and has no crossovers.

== History ==
In 1877, the Rhenish Railway Company opened its Düsseldorf station at the modern Franklinbrücke (Franklin Bridge) just a few metres west of the modern Düsseldorf Zoo station. In 1889, the Prussian state railways opened Düsseldorf-Derendorf station (not to be confused with the current Düsseldorf-Derendorf S-Bahn station) at this site. In 1890, Düsseldorf–Derendorf freight yard was opened at the station.

Along with Bilk station and the central station (opened in 1891), it became one of three train main stations in Düsseldorf. Derendorf freight yard was the destination during the First World War for many hospital trains; the wounded were transferred there to converted tram cars to run to the urban hospitals.

Düsseldorf-Derendorf station was transferred in 1936 to its present location on Münsterstraße. The current Düsseldorf Zoo station was opened beneath Franklinbrücke in 1969 with the launch of the network of Rhine-Ruhr S-Bahn. Its current name commemorates the Düsseldorf Zoological Garden, which was located nearby to the north east between 1876 and 1943, when it was destroyed in an air raid. The current zoo is one kilometre further north east.

== Location ==
The station is located between the districts of Düsseldorf-Düsseltal and Düsseldorf-Pempelfort. It has a central platform next to the Franklinbrücke. Crossing over the railway tracks is a tram line, which connects with the trains at the station.

== Lines ==
Currently the station is served by three lines of the S-Bahn, S 1, S 6 and S 11. Tram line 706 of the Rheinbahn stops at the adjacent Franklinbrücke stop.

Line	Route	Frequency
S1	Dortmund Hbf (1) – Bochum Hbf – Essen Hbf (2) – Duisburg Hbf – Düsseldorf Zoo – Düsseldorf Hbf (3) – Hilden – Solingen (4)	15 min (1–2), 30 min (2–3), 20 min (3–4)
S6	Essen Hbf – Kettwig – Ratingen Ost – Düsseldorf Zoo – Düsseldorf Hbf – Cologne Hbf – Köln-Nippes	20 min
S11	Düsseldorf Airport Terminal – Düsseldorf Zoo – Düsseldorf Hbf – Neuss Hbf – Dormagen – Cologne Hbf – Bergisch Gladbach	20 min
706	Düsseldorf-Hamm station –Schadowstraße–Düsseldorf Zoo– Brehmplatz– Am Steinberg	10 min
