= Köln Volkhovener Weg station =

Railway station in Cologne, Germany

Köln Volkhovener Weg
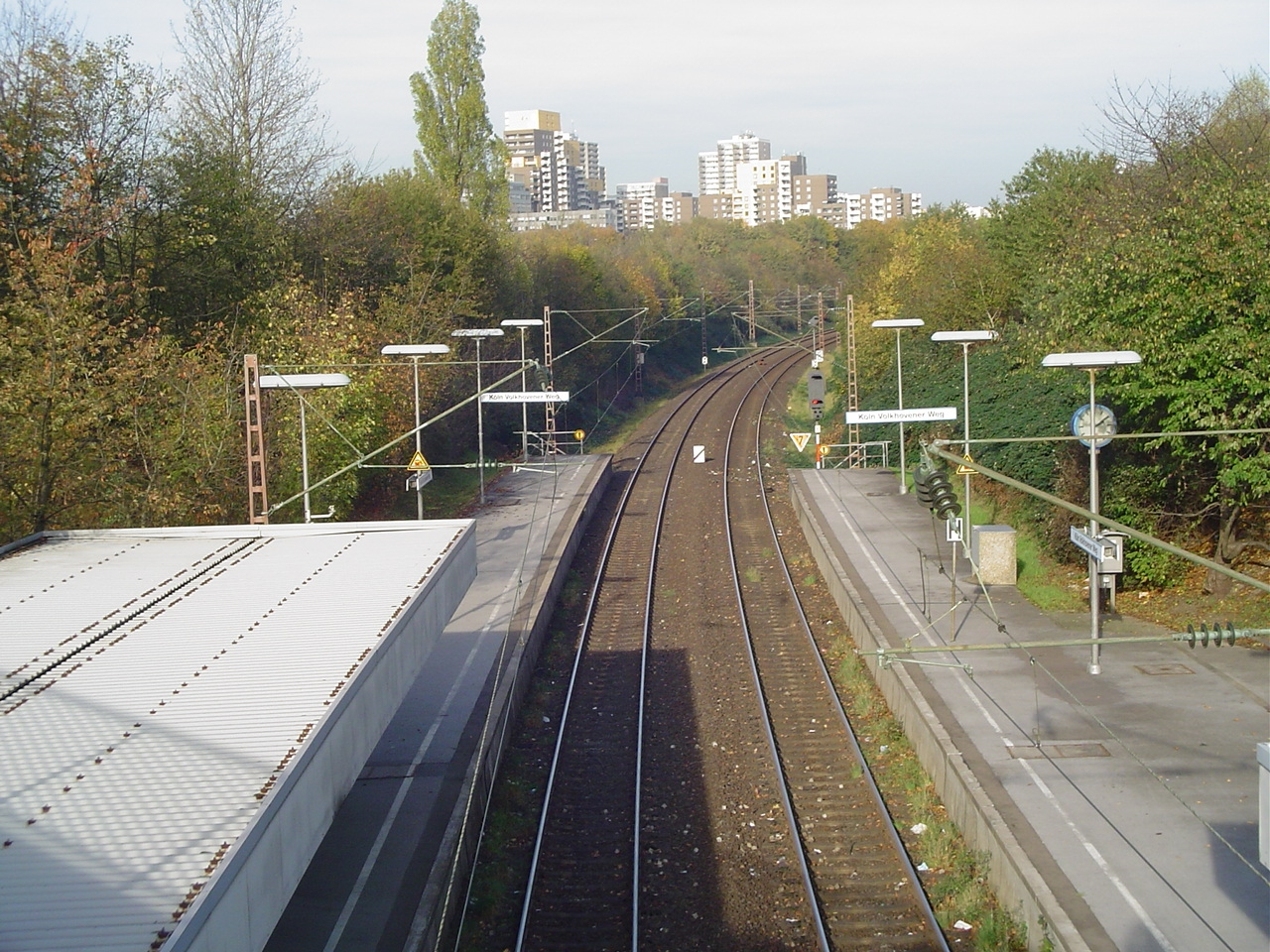

General information
- Location: Chorweiler, Cologne, NRW; Germany
- Coordinates: 51°00′53″N 6°53′36″E
- Line: Lower Left Rhine Railway
- Platforms: 2

Construction
- Accessible: Yes

Other information
- Station code: 3323
- DS100 code: KKV
- Category: 5
- Fare zone: VRS: 2100
- Website: www.bahnhof.de

History
- Opened: 1 June 1975

Services
Preceding station	Cologne S-Bahn	Following station
Köln-Chorweiler towards Düsseldorf Airport Terminal	S11	Köln-Longerich towards Bergisch Gladbach
Location

Köln Volkhovener Weg is a railway station situated at Chorweiler, Cologne in western Germany. It is served by the S11 line of the Cologne S-Bahn.
