= Köln-Longerich station =

Railway station in Cologne, Germany

Köln Longerich
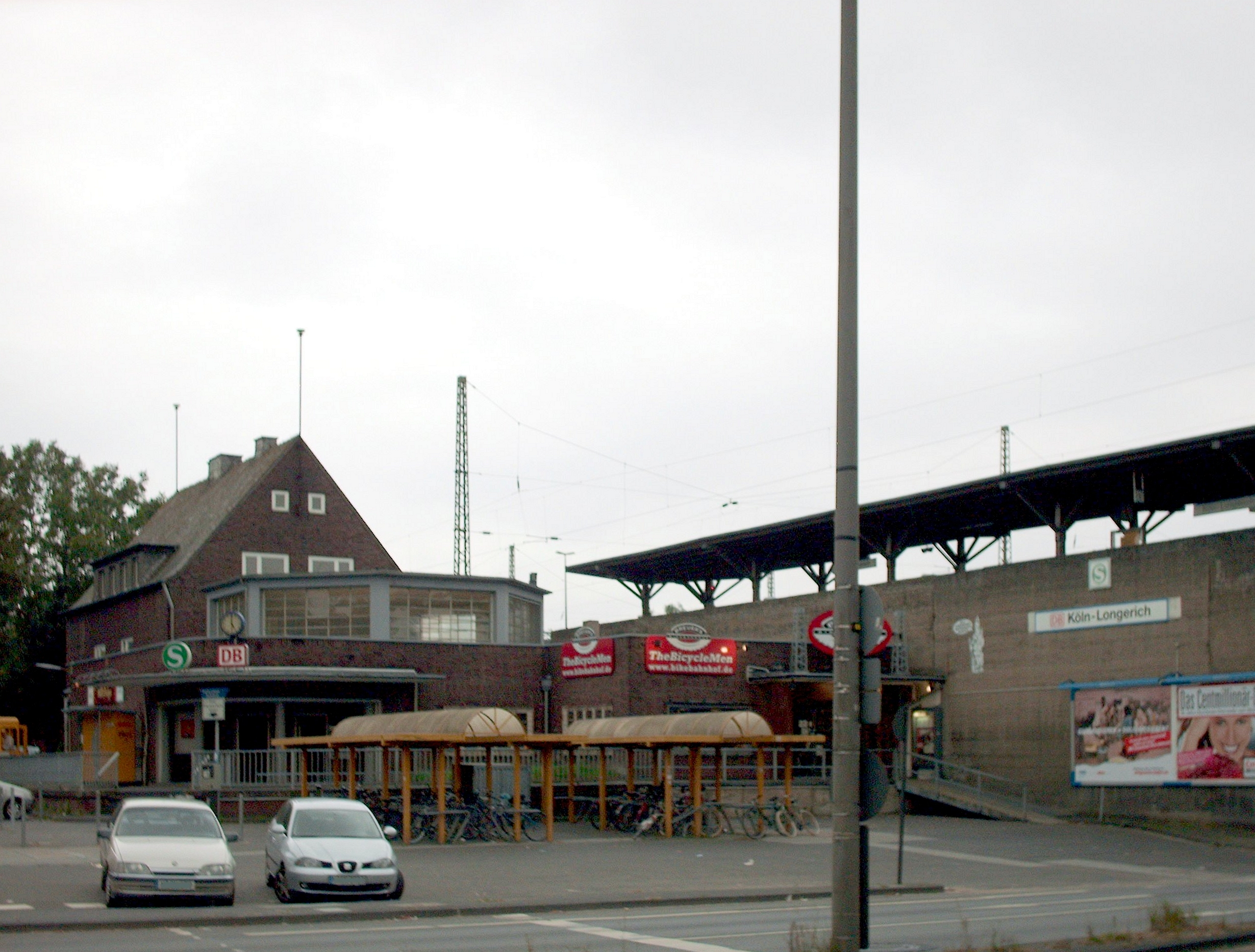

General information
- Location: Cologne, NRW; Germany
- Coordinates: 50°59′52″N 6°54′6″E
- Line: Lower Left Rhine Railway
- Platforms: 2

Construction
- Accessible: No

Other information
- Station code: 3335
- DS100 code: KKL
- Category: 4
- Fare zone: VRS: 2100
- Website: www.bahnhof.de

History
- Opened: 15 November 1855

Services
Preceding station	Cologne S-Bahn	Following station
Köln-Volkhovener Weg towards Düsseldorf Airport Terminal	S11	Köln Geldernstraße/Parkgürtel towards Bergisch Gladbach
Location
- Location within North Rhine-Westphalia

Köln-Longerich is a railway station situated at Longerich, Cologne in western Germany. It is served by the S11 line of the Cologne S-Bahn.
