= Köln-Blumenberg station =

Railway station in Germany

Köln Blumenberg
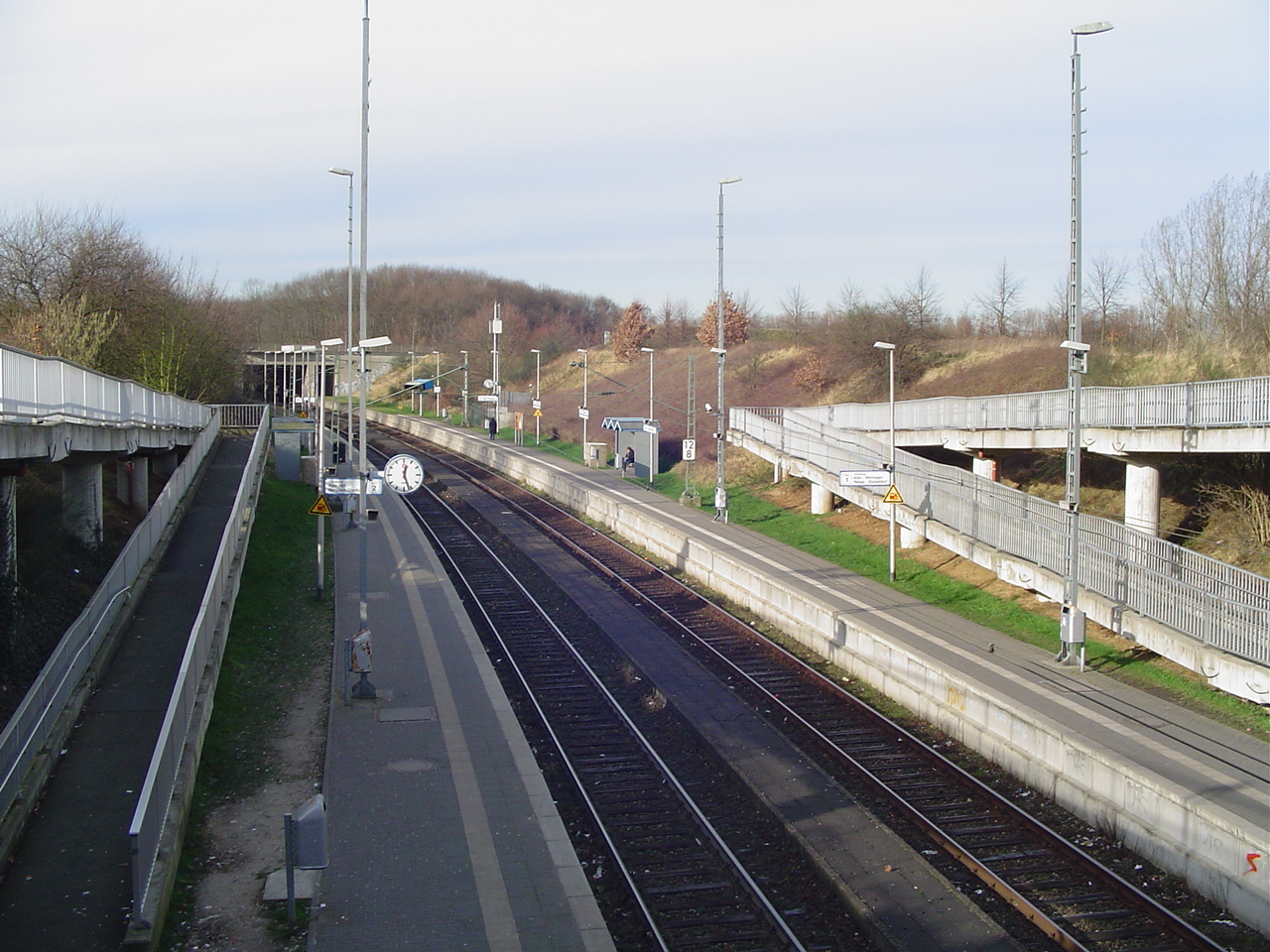
- Köln-Blumenberg station in 2007

General information
- Location: Geiersbergstr. 29; 50765 Köln-Blumenberg; Cologne, NRW; Germany
- Coordinates: 51°02′14″N 6°52′56″E

Construction
- Accessible: Yes

Other information
- Station code: 7651
- DS100 code: KKBL
- Category: 5
- Fare zone: VRS: 2100
- Website: www.bahnhof.de

History
- Opened: 1997/98

Services
Preceding station	Cologne S-Bahn	Following station
Köln-Worringen towards Düsseldorf Airport Terminal	S11	Köln-Chorweiler Nord towards Bergisch Gladbach
Location

Köln-Blumenberg is a railway station on the Lower Left Rhine Railway, situated in Cologne in western Germany. It is served by the S11 line of the Cologne S-Bahn at 20-minute intervals from Monday to Friday and at 30-minute intervals on the weekend.
