= Dormagen Chempark station =

Railway station in Germany

Dormagen Chempark
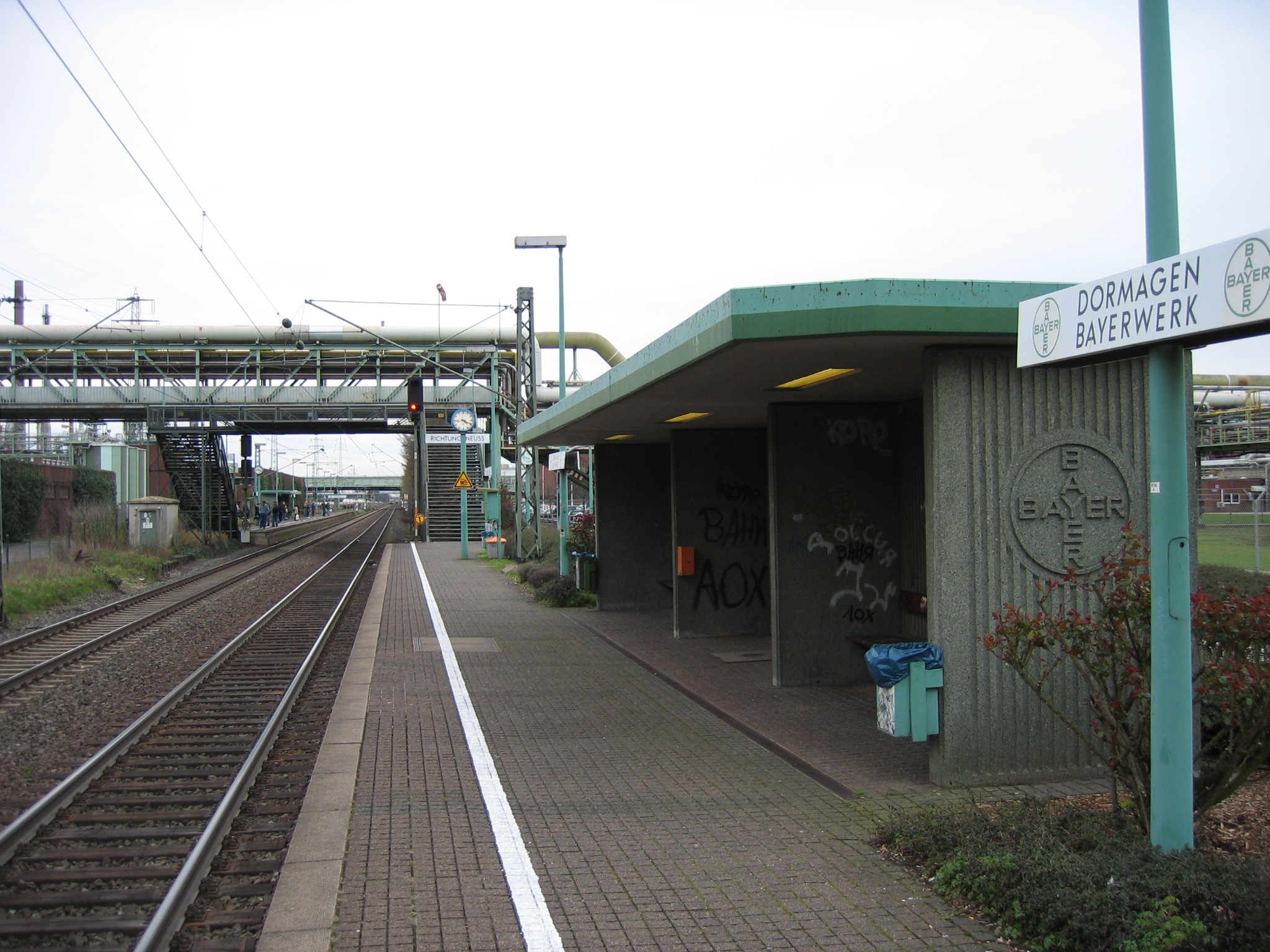

General information
- Location: Parallelweg, Dormagen, NRW; Germany
- Coordinates: 51°04′38″N 6°50′16″E
- Lines: Lower Left Rhine Railway (KBS 450.11)
- Platforms: 2

Construction
- Accessible: No

Other information
- Station code: 1275
- DS100 code: KDBW
- IBNR: 8001507
- Category: 6
- Fare zone: VRR: 620; VRS: 1620 and 2100 (VRR transitional tariff)
- Website: www.bahnhof.de

History
- Opened: 1917/18 to 1918/19; 1948
- Former names: Hackenbroich; Dormagen Bayerwerk

Services
Preceding station	Cologne S-Bahn	Following station
Dormagen towards Düsseldorf Airport Terminal	S11	Köln-Worringen towards Bergisch Gladbach
Location

Dormagen Chempark station is a station in the town of Dormagen in the German state of North Rhine-Westphalia. Chemiepark Dormagen is the location of a large Bayer works. The station is on the Lower Left Rhine Railway and it is classified by Deutsche Bahn as a category 6 station. The station was opened briefly during World War I as Hackenbroich. It was reopened in 1948 and was renamed Dormagen Bayerwerk between 1954 and 1957. It was renamed Dormagen Chempark on 15 December 2013.

The station is served by line S 11 of the Cologne S-Bahn, running between Düsseldorf Airport and Bergisch Gladbach every 20 minutes during the day.

== See also ==
- Leverkusen Chempark station
- Krefeld-Hohenbudberg Chempark station
