= Köln Geldernstraße/Parkgürtel station =

Railway station in Cologne, Germany

Köln Geldernstraße/Parkgürtel
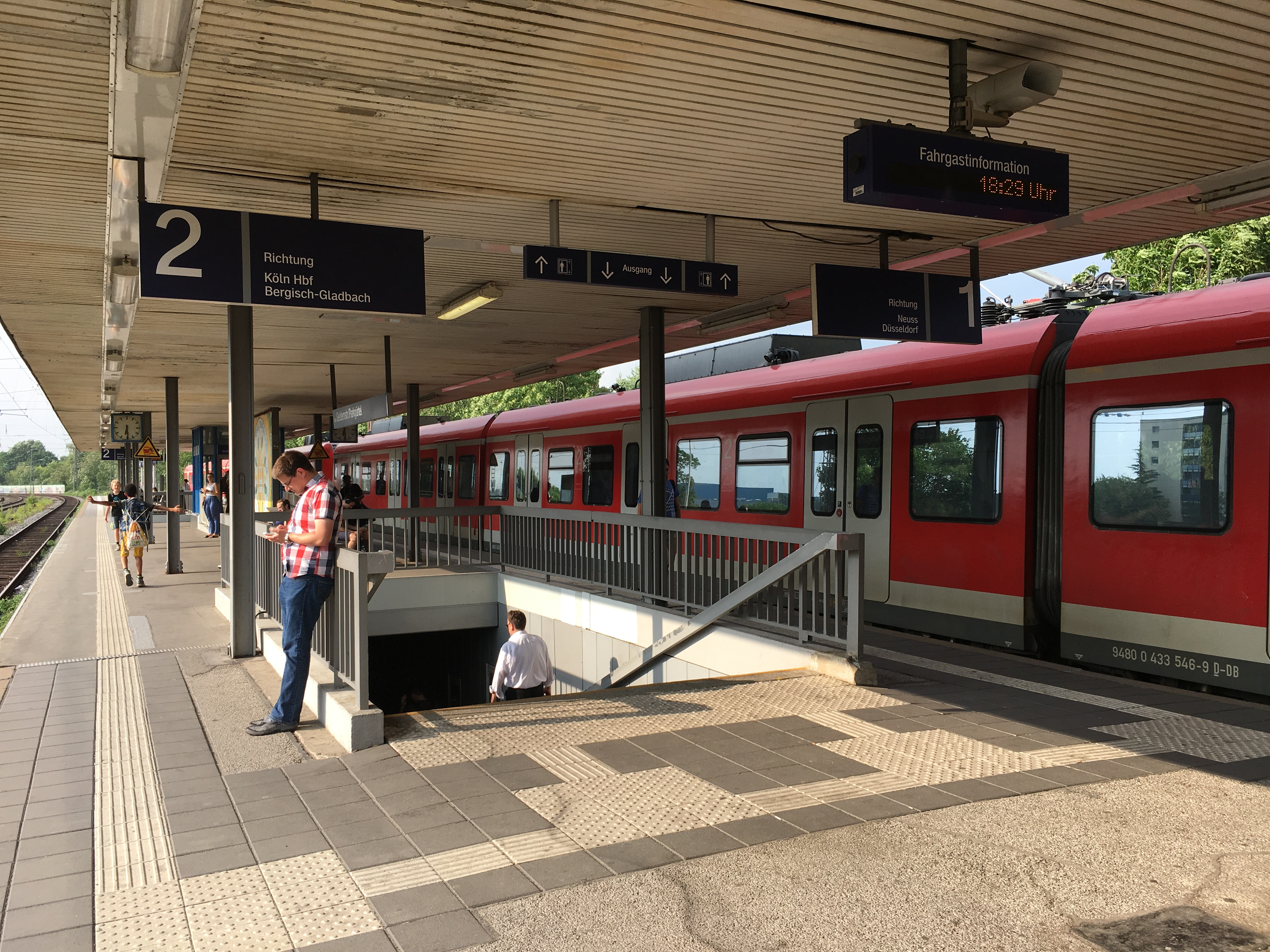

General information
- Location: Cologne, NRW; Germany
- Coordinates: 50°58′7″N 6°56′28″E
- Line: Lower Left Rhine Railway
- Platforms: 2

Construction
- Accessible: Yes

Other information
- Station code: 3319
- DS100 code: KKP
- Category: 4
- Fare zone: VRS: 2100
- Website: www.bahnhof.de

History
- Opened: 1 June 1975

Services
| Preceding station | Cologne S-Bahn | Following station |
|---|---|---|
| Köln-Longerich towards Düsseldorf Airport Terminal | S11 | Köln-Nippes towards Bergisch Gladbach |
| Preceding station | Cologne Stadtbahn | Following station |
| Escher Straße towards Sülzgürtel | Line 13 | Neusser Straße/Gürtel towards Holweide Vischeringstraße |
Location
- Location within North Rhine-Westphalia

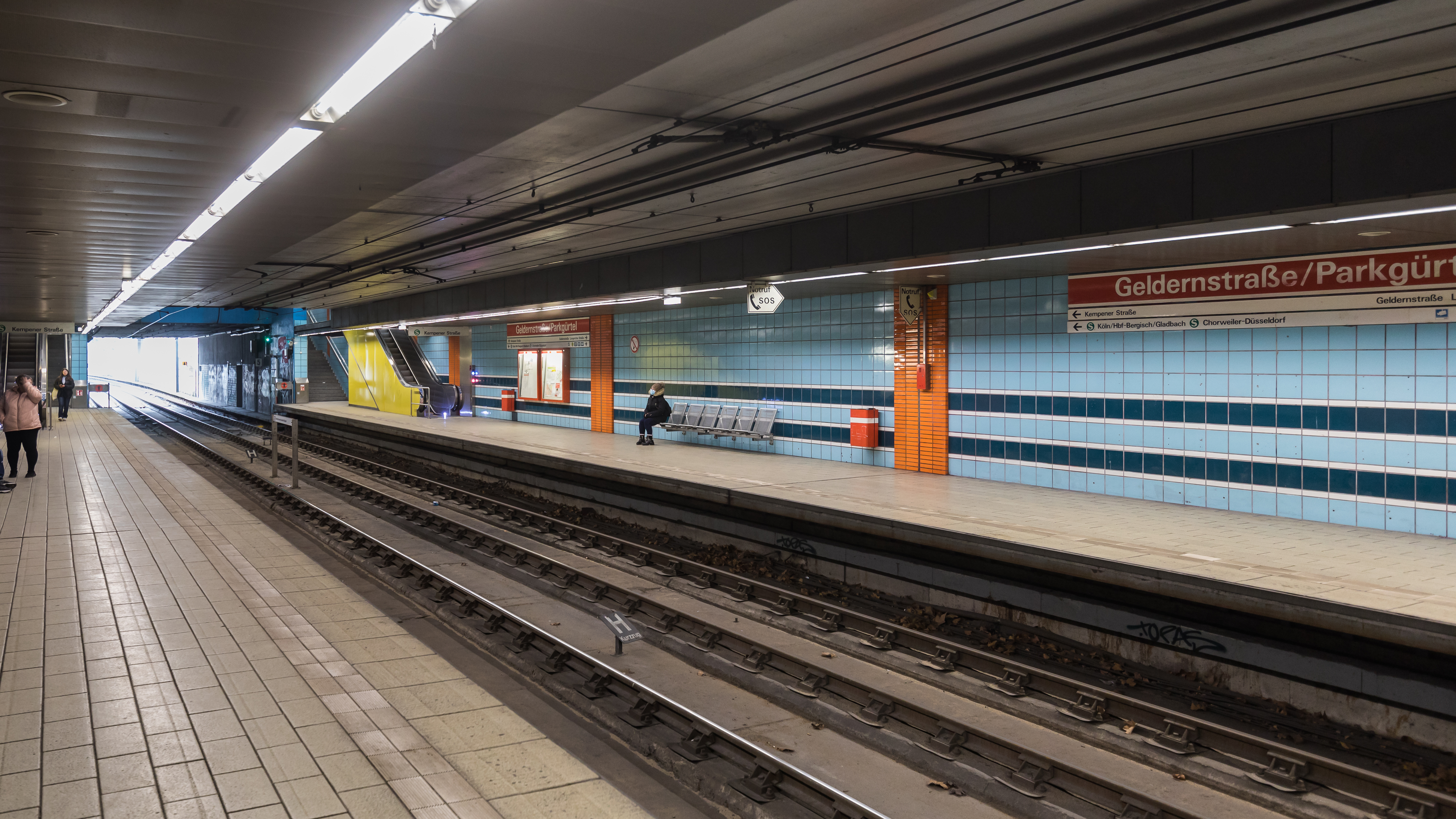
Geldernstraße/Parkgürtel KVB station

Köln Geldernstraße/Parkgürtel station is a railway station situated at Bilderstöckchen, Cologne in western Germany. It is served by line S11 of the Cologne S-Bahn.

An adjacent underground station links the station with the Cologne Stadtbahn KVB light rail network.

The station is also served by bus lines 121, 127 and 147.
