= Nievenheim station =

Railway station in Germany

Nievenheim
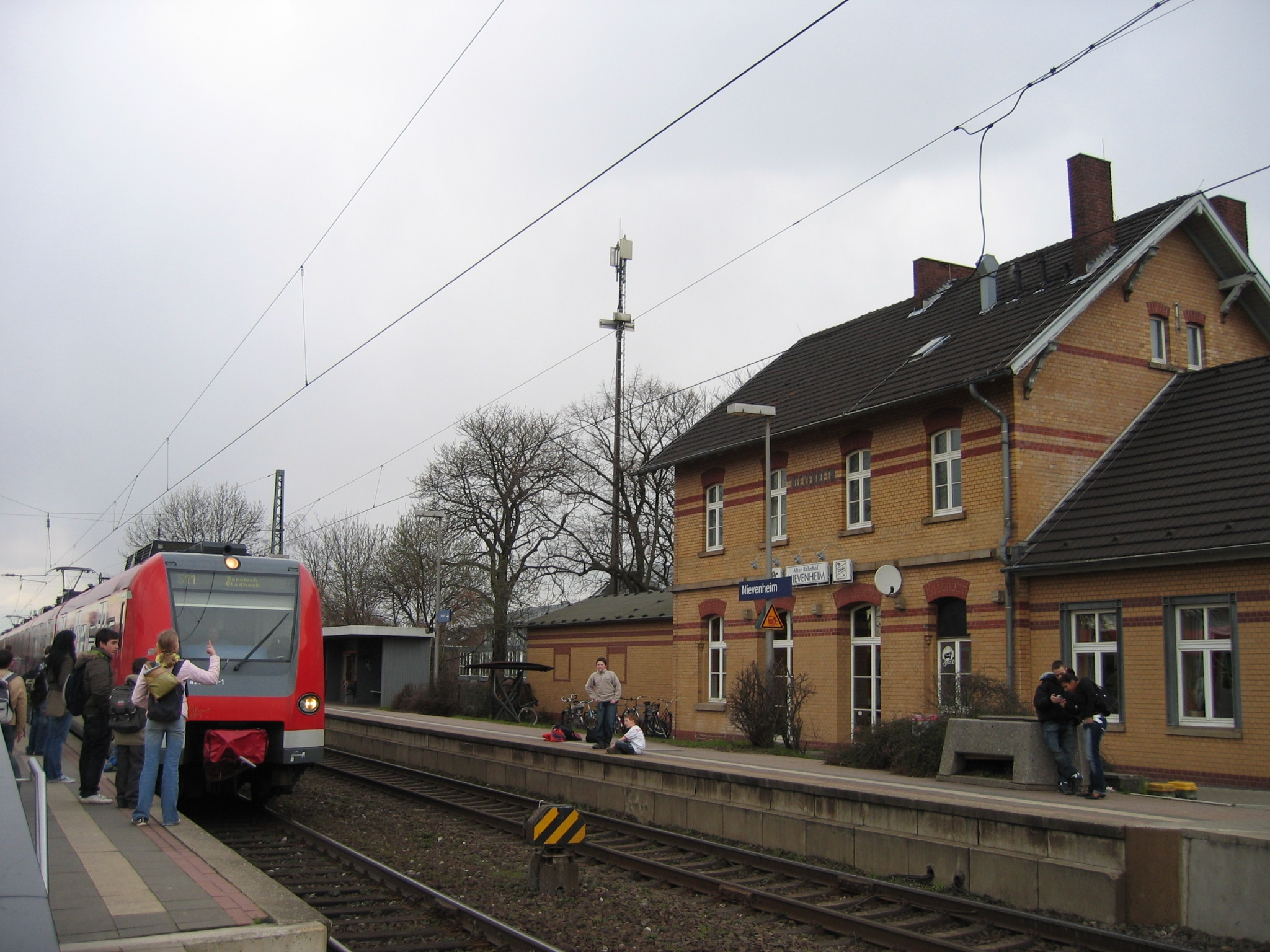

General information
- Location: Dormagen, NRW; Germany
- Coordinates: 51°07′25″N 6°46′56″E
- Lines: Lower Left Rhine Railway (KBS 450.11)
- Platforms: 2

Construction
- Accessible: Yes

Other information
- Station code: 4554
- DS100 code: KNIV
- Category: 6
- Fare zone: VRR: 624; VRS: 1620 (VRR transitional tariff)
- Website: www.bahnhof.de

History
- Opened: 1880/97

Services
Preceding station	Cologne S-Bahn	Following station
Neuss Allerheiligen towards Düsseldorf Airport Terminal	S11	Dormagen towards Bergisch Gladbach
Location

Nievenheim station is a station in the district of Nievenheim in the town of Dormagen in the German state of North Rhine-Westphalia. It is on the Lower Left Rhine Railway and it is classified by Deutsche Bahn as a category 6 station. The station was opened between 1880 and 1897.

The station is served by line S 11 of the Cologne S-Bahn, running between Düsseldorf Airport and Bergisch Gladbach every 20 minutes during the day.

It is also served by four bus routes operated by StadtBus Dormagen: 884 (at 60 minute intervals), 885 (60), 886 (30) and WE2 (60).
