= Düsseldorf-Derendorf station =

Railway station in Düsseldorf, Germany

Düsseldorf Derendorf
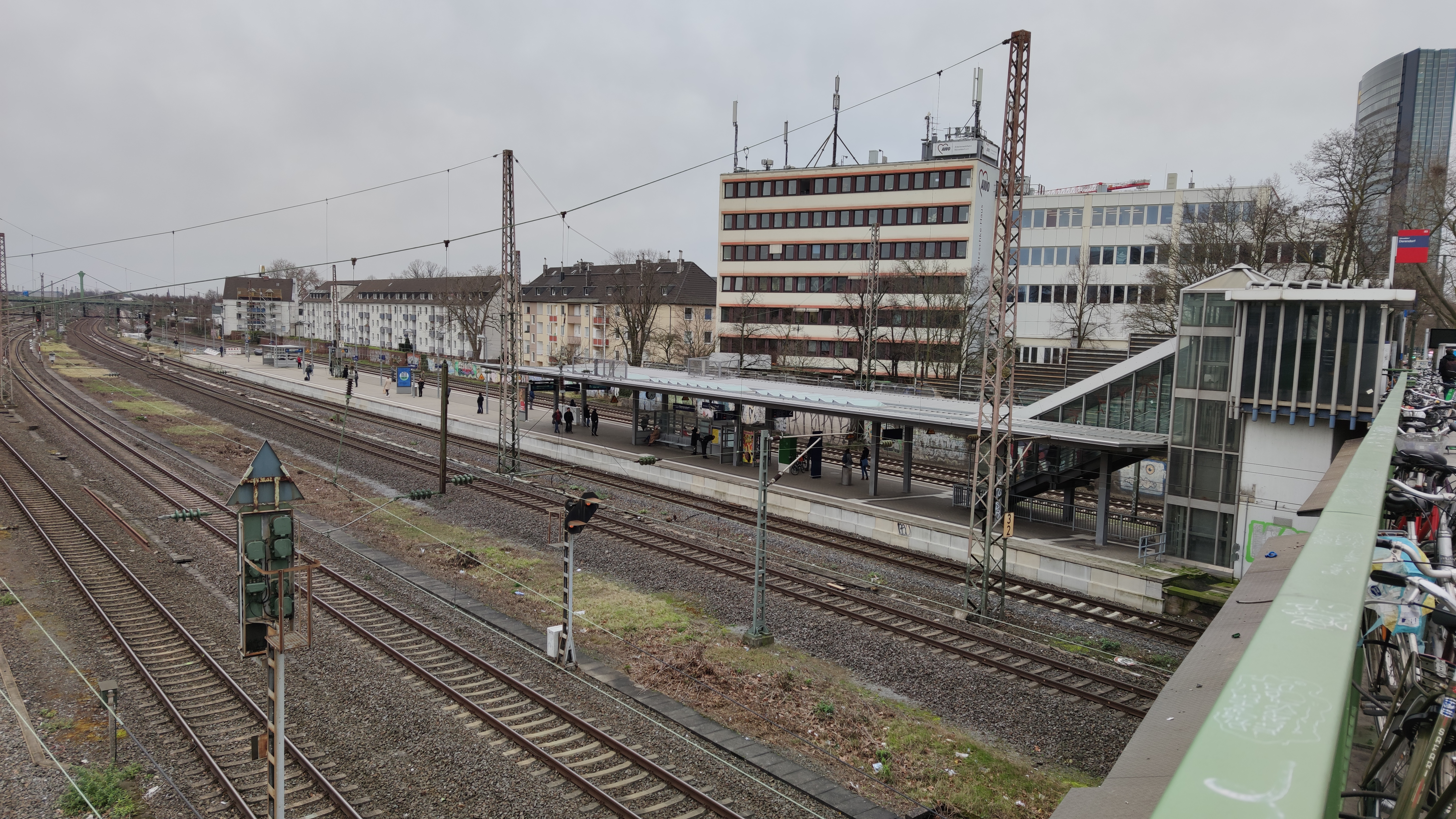

General information
- Location: Münsterstr. 199; Düsseldorf, North Rhine-Westphalia; Germany
- Coordinates: 51°14′51″N 6°47′40″E
- Lines: Cologne–Duisburg (KBS 415); Düsseldorf–Essen
- Platforms: 2

Construction
- Accessible: Yes

Other information
- Station code: 1406
- DS100 code: KDDH
- IBNR: 8001586
- Category: 4
- Fare zone: VRR: 430; VRS: 1430 (VRR transitional zone)
- Website: www.bahnhof.de

History
- Opened: 1936

Services
Preceding station	Rhine-Ruhr S-Bahn	Following station
Düsseldorf Zoo towards Solingen Hbf	S1	Düsseldorf-Unterrath towards Dortmund Hbf
Düsseldorf Zoo towards Köln-Nippes	S6	Düsseldorf-Rath Mitte towards Essen Hbf
Preceding station	Cologne S-Bahn	Following station
Düsseldorf Zoo towards Bergisch Gladbach	S11	Düsseldorf-Unterrath towards Düsseldorf Airport Terminal
Location
- Location within North Rhine-Westphalia

Düsseldorf-Derendorf is a railway station situated at Derendorf, Düsseldorf in western Germany. It is served by Rhine-Ruhr S-Bahn lines S1 (every 30 minutes during the day) and S6 (every 20 minutes) and Cologne S-Bahn line S11 (every 20 minutes). It is also served by tram line 701 and various bus lines, all operated by Rheinbahn.
