= Köln-Nippes station =

Railway station in Nippes, Germany

Köln Nippes
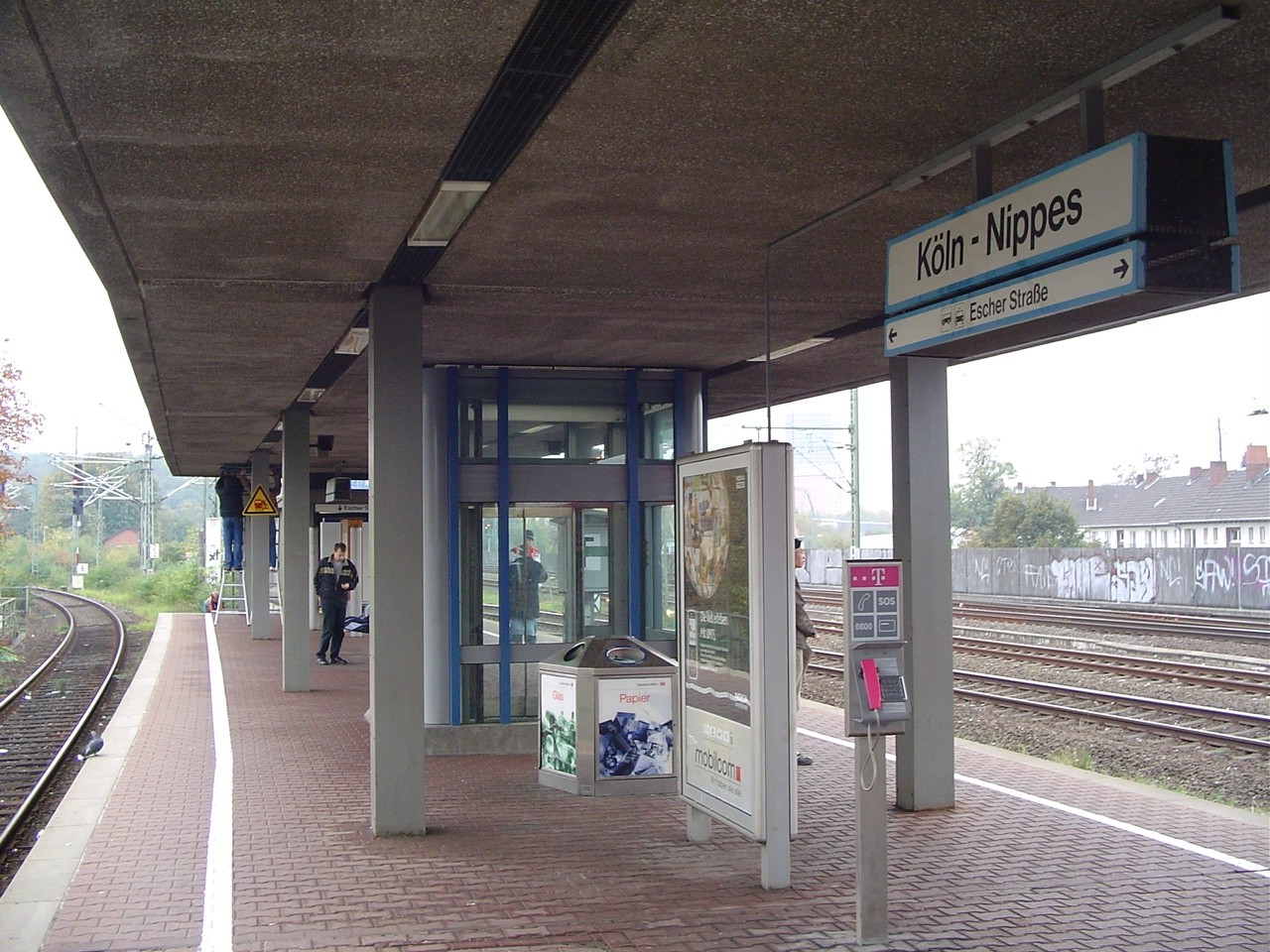

General information
- Location: Nippes, Cologne (Köln), NRW; Germany
- Coordinates: 50°57′32″N 6°56′30″E
- Line: Lower Left Rhine Railway
- Platforms: 1
- Tracks: 2

Construction
- Accessible: Yes

Other information
- Station code: 3337
- DS100 code: KKN
- IBNR: 03372
- Category: 4
- Fare zone: VRS: 2100
- Website: www.bahnhof.de

History
- Opened: 15 November 1855

Services
Preceding station	Rhine-Ruhr S-Bahn	Following station
Terminus	S6	Köln Hansaring towards Essen Hbf
Preceding station	Cologne S-Bahn	Following station
Köln Geldernstraße/Parkgürtel towards Düsseldorf Airport Terminal	S11	Köln Hansaring towards Bergisch Gladbach
Location
- Location within North Rhine-Westphalia

Köln-Nippes is a passenger and freight railway station situated in Nippes, the northern border of the city of Cologne in western Germany. It is served by the S6 of the Rhine-Ruhr S-Bahn and S11 lines of the Cologne S-Bahn.
