= Düsseldorf-Unterrath–Düsseldorf Airport Terminal railway =

Railway line in Düsseldorf, Germany

Overview
- Line number: 2406 (Airport Terminal–D-Unterrath); 2408 (connecting curve)
- Locale: North Rhine-Westphalia, Germany

Service
- Route number: 450.7

Technical
- Line length: 2 km (1.2 mi)
- Number of tracks: 2 (throughout)
- Track gauge: 1,435 mm (4 ft 8 1/2 in) standard gauge
- Electrification: 15 kV/16.7 Hz AC overhead catenary
- Operating speed: 80 km/h (50 mph)

The Düsseldorf-Unterrath–Düsseldorf Airport Terminal railway is a branch line from Düsseldorf-Unterrath station on the Cologne–Duisburg line to Düsseldorf Airport Terminal station in the north of the North Rhine-Westphalian state capital of Düsseldorf in Germany.

The railway line is fully doubled with overhead electrification. It is also connected to the north from Düsseldorf-Unterrath Karthäuser Weg junction over a single-track electrified line.

== History ==
On 27 October 1975, in preparation for the upgrading of the line between Cologne and Duisburg for the introduction of S-Bahn services, a new line from Düsseldorf-Derendorf Dp junction to Düsseldorf Airport Terminal station opened for passenger traffic. For this purpose an existing siding had been duplicated and electrified and extended to the Terminal C building.

At the time the line crossed the north-bound track of freight line 2670 at grade on the approach to Düsseldorf-Rath station, until the late 1980s when grade separated access was built to Unterrath station. On 27 May 1990, a northern access line was put into operation so that trains from the Ruhr area could approach the terminal station directly from the former Kalkum station.

After the disastrous fire at the airport in 1996 and the subsequent short-term closure of the terminal, a temporary platform was opened halfway along the line, called Düsseldorf Airport Departure Terminal E. It was located near the temporary Terminal E established only for departures and operated until the opening of the Düsseldorf Airport long-distance station on 26 May 2000.

== Operations ==
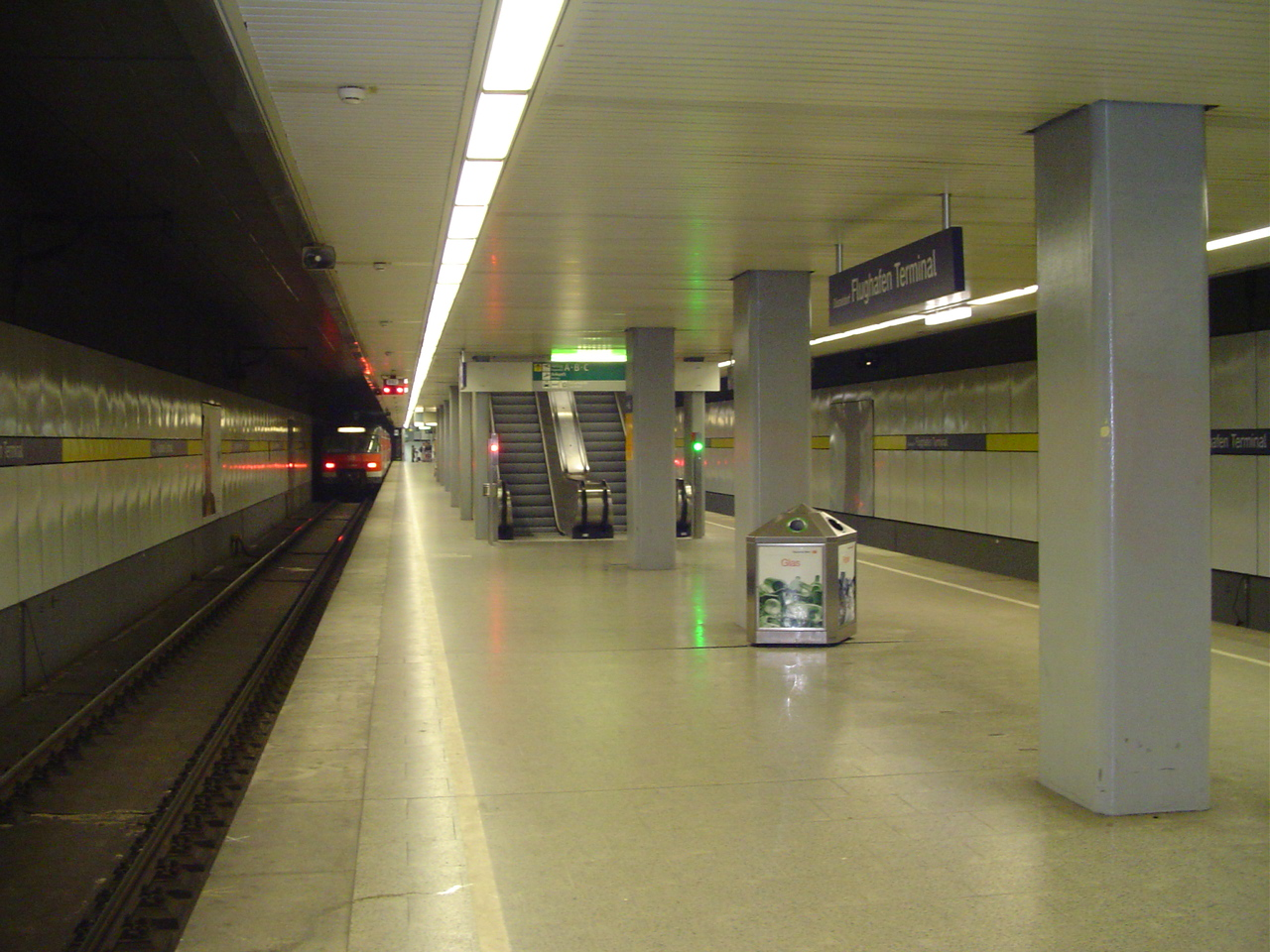
Düsseldorf Airport Terminal station

With the opening of the station on the main line from Düsseldorf to Duisburg the connecting line from the north was superfluous. Reversing in the underground station was too time-consuming for through trains such as the former S-Bahn line S 21, which ran parallel to line S 1.

Due to problems with the installation and acceptance of the Skytrain at first, a bus shuttle was established. The Skytrain is a driverless suspended monorail train, which commenced operations on 1 July 2002 and now connects the long-distance station via two intermediate stops at P4 parking station and Terminal A/B to the Terminal C station.

== Rail services ==
The track is served by line S 11 of the Rhine-Ruhr S-Bahn operating as follows: Düsseldorf Flughafen Terminal – Düsseldorf-Unterrath – Düsseldorf-Derendorf – Düsseldorf Hbf – Neuss Hbf – Dormagen – Cologne Hbf – Bergisch Gladbach.
