= Köln-Chorweiler Nord station =

Railway station in Germany

Köln Chorweiler Nord
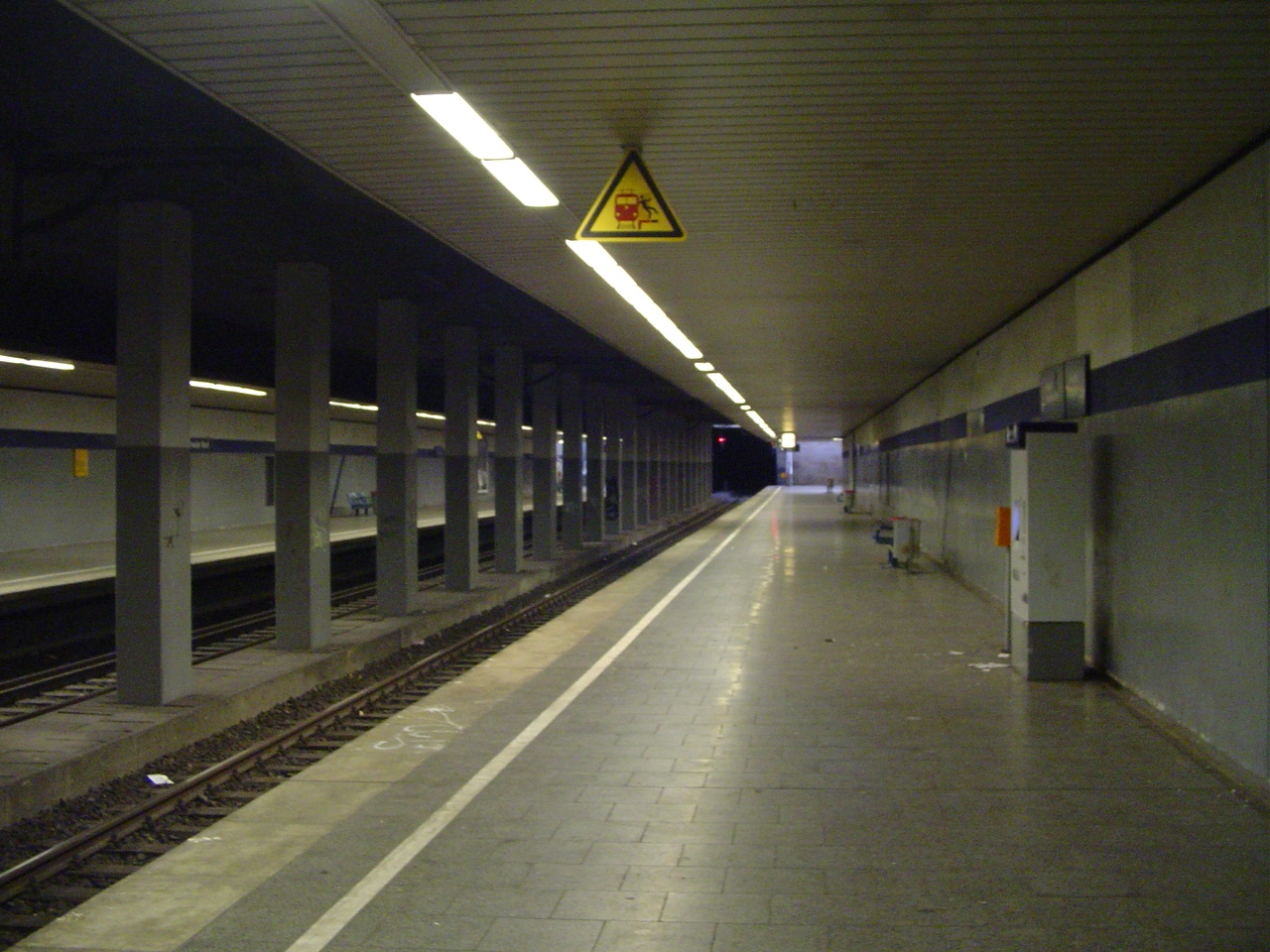
- Köln-Chorweiler Nord station

General information
- Location: Weserpromenade; 50769 Köln; Chorweiler, Cologne, NRW; Germany
- Coordinates: 51°1′43″N 6°53′32″E

Construction
- Accessible: No

Other information
- Station code: 3327
- DS100 code: KKCN
- Category: 5
- Fare zone: VRS: 2100
- Website: www.bahnhof.de

History
- Opened: 22 May 1977

Services
Preceding station	Cologne S-Bahn	Following station
Köln-Blumenberg towards Düsseldorf Airport Terminal	S11	Köln-Chorweiler towards Bergisch Gladbach
Location

Köln-Chorweiler Nord is a railway station situated at Chorweiler, Cologne in western Germany. It is served by the S11 line of the Cologne S-Bahn at 20-minute intervals from Monday to Friday and at 30-minute intervals on the weekend.
