= Köln-Chorweiler station =

Subway and railway station in Cologne, Germany

Köln Chorweiler
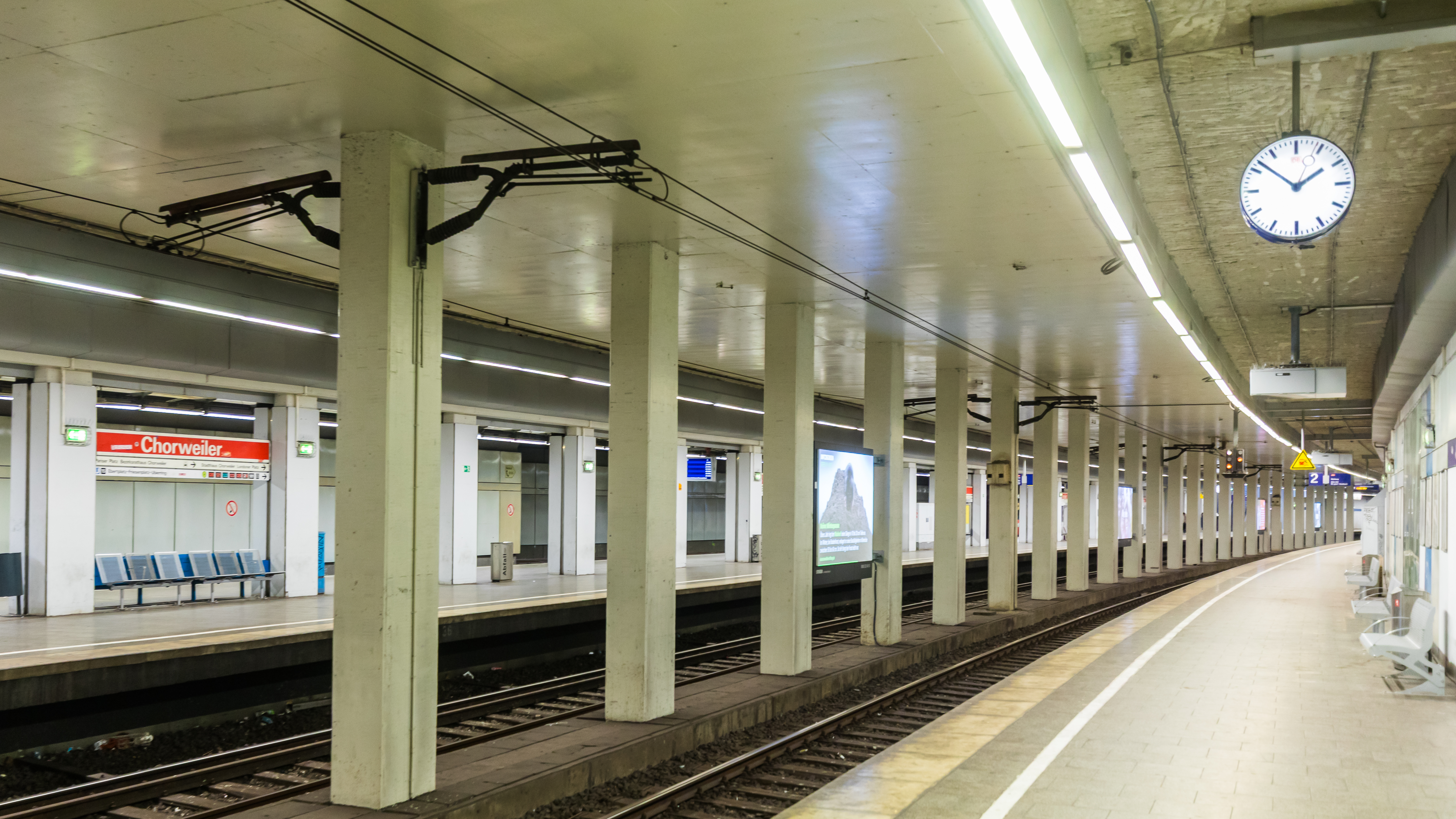
- Köln-Chorweiler station

General information
- Location: Liverpooler Platz; 50769 Köln; Chorweiler, Cologne, NRW; Germany
- Coordinates: 51°01′16″N 6°53′53″E

Construction
- Accessible: Yes

Other information
- Station code: 3326
- DS100 code: KKC
- IBNR: 8003365
- Category: 4
- Fare zone: VRS: 2100
- Website: www.bahnhof.de

History
- Opened: 1 June 1975

Services
Preceding station	Cologne S-Bahn	Following station
Köln-Chorweiler Nord towards Düsseldorf Airport Terminal	S11	Köln-Volkhovener Weg towards Bergisch Gladbach
Preceding station	Cologne Stadtbahn	Following station
Terminus	Line 15	Heimersdorf towards Ubierring
Location

Köln-Chorweiler is a combined light rail and railway station situated at Chorweiler, Cologne in western Germany. It is served by the S11 line of the Cologne S-Bahn and line 15 of Cologne Stadtbahn. It is classified by Deutsche Bahn as a category 4 station.

== History ==
The genesis of the joint Stadtbahn and S-Bahn station and the railway lines on which it lies, is closely linked to the development of a large housing estate of Chorweiler. Both the S-Bahn line, a loop from the Cologne–Neuss railway, as well as the Stadtbahn line, an extension of the line to Longerich, were built before the actual start of construction of the estate on a green-field site. The staggered start-up was based on the progress of construction of the residential buildings: the former tram line 9 operated to Chorweiler from 17 November 1973, while the S-Bahn line S11 ran to Chorweiler from 1 June 1975 and was extended to Chorweiler Nord on 22 May 1977.

== S-Bahn station ==
The S-Bahn station consists of a 210 m-long (690 ft) hall that is supported longitudinally by two rows of columns. On the west side, the two S-Bahn tracks run between two side platforms. The eastern platform is much wider and the Stadtbahn track stops on the opposite side of the platform from the S-Bahn. There is another track without a platform behind the Stadtbahn platform track that was formerly used as part of a turning loop. The S-Bahn facilities are largely unchanged since their commissioning, while the Stadtbahn station has been rebuilt several times. The station is served by line 11 of the Cologne S-Bahn at 20-minute intervals from Monday to Friday and at 30-minute intervals on the weekend.

== Stadtbahn station ==
At the inauguration of Chorweiler Stadtbahn station, it was operated by line 9 (then running Chorweiler–Ebertplatz–Neumarkt–Severinsbrücke–Königsforst) with Duewag articulated trams. Incoming trains first ran through the turning loop before stopping at the platform. Since the infrastructure was designed for high-floor Stadtbahn vehicles, the tracks were raised by the insertion of half a metre of additional gravel.

After the reorganisation of the Stadtbahn network in 1994, Chorweiler was served by line 18 (Chorweiler–Ebertplatz–Neumarkt–Klettenberg–Brühl–Bonn) with Stadtbahnwagen B cars. As a result of the change, the tracks were lowered in preparation for the operation of high-floor cars, as originally envisaged, and the turning loop was abandoned as it was no longer required for the new bi-directional vehicles. Incoming trains now switch to the platform track in the middle of the station and passengers exit at the northern end of the platform. After reversing, the train passes through the points to the beginning of the platform, where it picks up new passengers.

Since the reorganisation of the Stadtbahn network in 2003, Chorweiler is now served by line 15 (Chorweiler–Ebertplatz–Friesenplatz–Ubierring). This line was also initially operated with Stadtbahnwagen B cars, however, it was later shifted to the low-floor part of the Cologne Stadtbahn network, which uses Bombardier Flexity Swift cars. In preparation for this change, the Stadtbahn tracks in Chorweiler were raised in the summer holidays of 2006. Since autumn 2006, line 15 has been a low-floor line.
