= Dormagen station =

Railway station in Germany

Dormagen
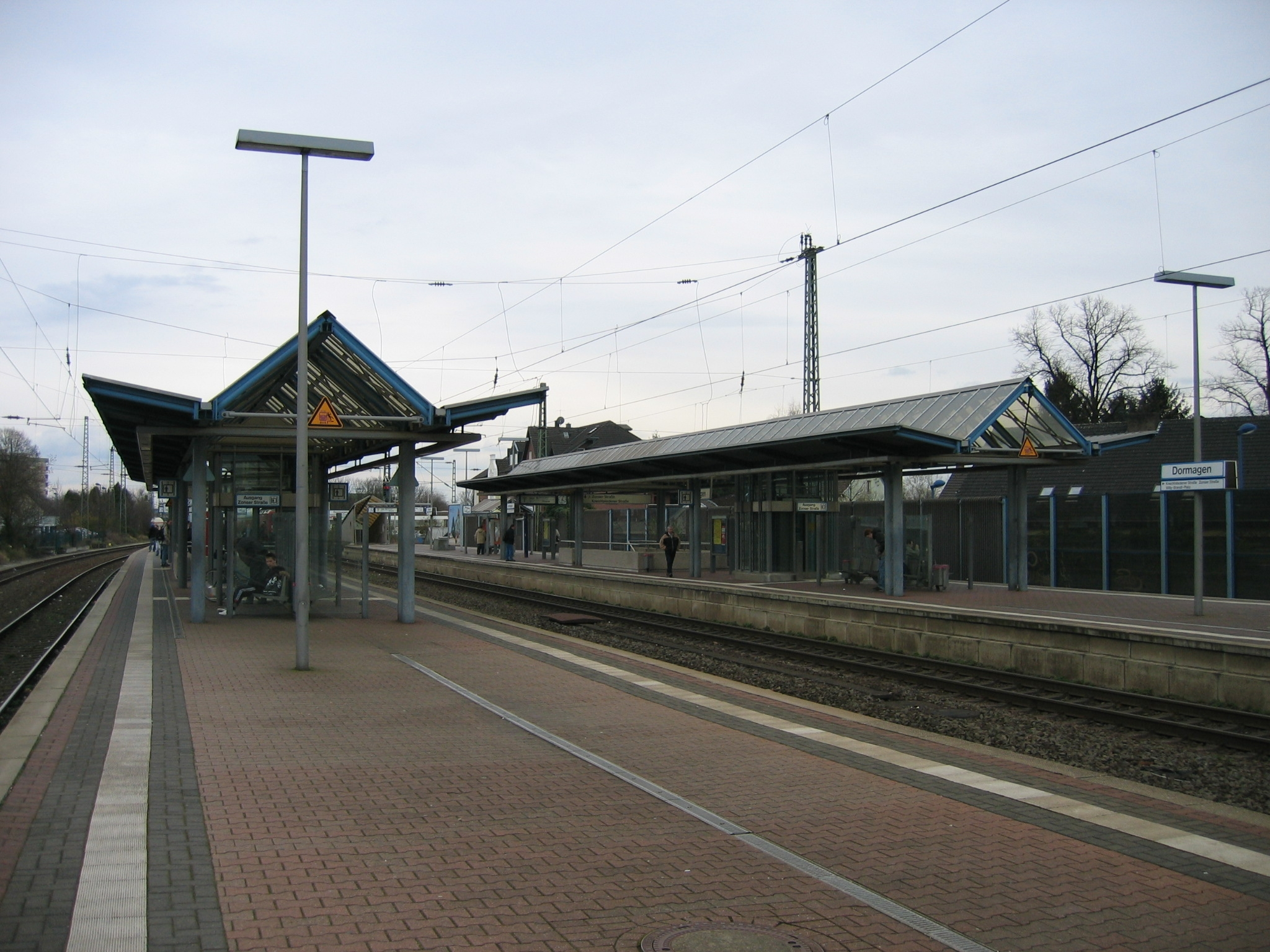

General information
- Location: Willy-Brandt-Platz 87, Dormagen, NRW; Germany
- Coordinates: 51°05′56″N 6°48′57″E
- Owner: DB Netz
- Operator: DB Station&Service
- Lines: Lower Left Rhine Railway (KBS 495)
- Platforms: 2 island platforms
- Tracks: 4

Construction
- Accessible: Yes

Other information
- Station code: 1274
- DS100 code: KDO
- IBNR: 8001506
- Category: 4
- Fare zone: VRR: 620; VRS: 1620 (VRR transitional zone)
- Website: www.bahnhof.de

History
- Opened: 15 November 1855

Services
Preceding station	National Express Germany	Following station
Neuss Hbf towards Minden (Westfalen)	RE 6 (Rhein-Weser-Express)	Köln Hbf towards Cologne/Bonn Airport
Neuss Hbf towards Krefeld Hbf	RE 7 (Rhein-Münsterland-Express)	Köln Hbf towards Rheine
Preceding station	Cologne S-Bahn	Following station
Nievenheim towards Düsseldorf Airport Terminal	S11	Dormagen Chempark towards Bergisch Gladbach
Location
- Location within North Rhine-Westphalia

Dormagen station is a station in the town of Dormagen in the state of North Rhine-Westphalia on the Sülztalbahn. It is served by the hourly Rhein-Münsterland-Express (RE 7) Rheine to Krefeld. The hourly journeys from Cologne Bonn Airport to Minden (Westf) (RE 6) Rhein-Ruhr Express. The S-Bahn line S 11 runs every 20 minutes from Düsseldorf Airport Terminal to Bergisch Gladbach. It has Two Platform and Four Platforms Tracks.

S11 (Düsseldorf Flughafen Terminal - Bergisch Gladbach ) (stopovers).

D-Flughafen Terminal, D-Unterrath, D-Derendorf, D-Zoo, D-Wehrhahn, Düsseldorf Hbf, D-Friedrichstadt, D-Bilk, D-Völklinger Str, D-Hamm, NE-Rheinpark Center, NE-Am Kaiser, Neuss Hbf, Neuss Süd, Neuss Norf, Neuss-Allerheiligen, Dormagen Nievenheim, Dormagen, Dormagen Chempark, K-Worringen, K-Blumenberg, K-Chorweiler Nord, K-Chorweiler, K-Volkhovener Weg, K-Longerich, K-Geldernstr/Parkgürtel, K-Nippes, K-Hansaring, Köln Hbf, K-Messe/Deutz, K- Trimbornstr, K-Buchforst, K-Mülheim, K-Holweide, K-Dellbrück, Duckterath, Bergisch Gladbach.

RE6 (Minden Westf - Köln Bonn Flughafen ) (stopovers).

Minden (Westf), Porta Westfalica, Bad Oeynhausen, Löhne (Westf), Herford, Bielefeld Hbf, Gütersloh Hbf, Rheda-WiedenbrücK oelde, Neubeckum, Ahlen (Westf), Hamm-HeessenHamm (Westf) Hbf, Kamen, Dortmund Hbf, Bochum Hbf, Wattenscheid, Essen Hbf, Mülheim (Ruhr) Hbf, Duisburg Hbf, Düsseldorf Flughafen, Düsseldorf Hbf, Düsseldorf-Bilk, Neuss Hbf, Dormagen, Köln Hbf, Köln Messe/Deutz, Köln Trimbornstr, Köln/Bonn Flughafen.

RE 7 (Rheine - Krefeld) (stopovers).

Rheine, Rheine-Mesum, Emsdetten, Reckenfeld, Greven, Münster-Sprakel, Münster Zentrum Nord, Münster (Westf) Hbf, Münster-Hiltrup, Rinkerode, Drensteinfurt, Mersch (Westf), Bockum-Hövel, Hamm (Westf) Hbf, Bönen, Unna, Holzwickede Dortmund Airport, Schwerte (Ruhr), Hagen (Westfalen) Hbf, Ennepetal (Gevelsberg), Schwelm, Wuppertal-Oberbarmen, Wuppertal Hbf , Wuppertal-Vohwinkel, Solingen Hbf, Opladen, Köln-Mülheim, Köln Trimbornstr Köln Messe/Deutz, Köln Hbf, Dormagen, Neuss Hbf, Meerbusch-Osterath, Krefeld-Oppum, Krefeld Hbf.

During construction work these trains will be diverted

RE 1 ( Hamm Westf - Aachen Hbf)(stopovers)

Hamm (Westfalen) Hauptbahnhof, Bönen-Nordbögge, Kamen, Kamen-Methler, Dortmund-Kurl, Dortmund-Scharnhorst, Dortmund Hauptbahnhof, Bochum Hauptbahnhof, Wattenscheid, Essen Hbf, Mülheim (Ruhr) Hauptbahnhof, Duisburg Hauptbahnhof, Düsseldorf Flughafen, Düsseldorf Hauptbahnhof, Düsseldorf-Benrath, Leverkusen Mitte, Köln-Mülheim, Köln Trimbornstr, Köln Messe/Deutz, Köln Hauptbahnhof, Köln-Ehrenfeld, Horrem, Düren, Langerwehe, Eschweiler Hauptbahnhof, Stolberg (Rheinland) Hauptbahnhof, Eilendorf, Aachen-Rothe Erde, Aachen Hauptbahnhof

Additional Stops beim Cunstruction Works (Düsseldorf Bilk, Neuss Hbf, Dormagen.)

Hamm (Westfalen) Hauptbahnhof, Bönen-Nordbögge, Kamen, Kamen-Methler, Dortmund-Kurl, Dortmund-Scharnhorst, Dortmund Hauptbahnhof, Bochum Hauptbahnhof, Wattenscheid, Essen Hbf, Mülheim (Ruhr) Hauptbahnhof, Duisburg Hauptbahnhof, Düsseldorf Flughafen, Düsseldorf Hauptbahnhof, Düsseldorf Hbf, Düsseldorf Bilk, Neuss Hbf, Dormagen,(Köln Trimbornstr)Köln-Ehrenfeld, Horrem, Düren, Langerwehe, Eschweiler Hauptbahnhof, Stolberg (Rheinland) Hauptbahnhof, Eilendorf, Aachen-Rothe Erde, Aachen Hauptbahnhof

RE5 ( Koblenz Hbf - Wesel (stopovers).

Wesel, Friedrichsfeld (Niederrhein) (zweistdl.), Voerde (Niederrhein)DinslakenOberhausen-Holten, Oberhausen-Sterkrade, Oberhausen Hbf, Duisburg Hbf, Düsseldorf Flughafen, Düsseldorf Hbf, Düsseldorf-Benrath, Leverkusen Mitte, Köln-Mülheim, Köln Trimbornstr, Köln Messe/Deutz, Köln Hbf, Köln Süd, Brühl, Bonn Hbf, Bonn UN Campus, Bonn-Bad Godesberg, Oberwinter, Remagen, Sinzig (Rhein), Bad Breisig, Andernach, Koblenz Stadtmitte, Koblenz Hbf

Additional Stops beim Cunstruction Works (Düsseldorf Bilk, Neuss Hbf, Dormagen.)'

Wesel, Friedrichsfeld (Niederrhein) (zweistdl.), Voerde (Niederrhein)DinslakenOberhausen-Holten, Oberhausen-Sterkrade, Oberhausen Hbf, Duisburg Hbf, Düsseldorf Flughafen, Düsseldorf Hbf, Düsseldorf Bilk, Neuss Hbf, Dormagen,(Köln Trimbornstr)Köln Süd, Brühl, Bonn Hbf, Bonn UN Campus, Bonn-Bad Godesberg, Oberwinter, Remagen, Sinzig (Rhein), Bad Breisig, Andernach, Koblenz Stadtmitte, Koblenz Hbf
