= Köln-Worringen station =

Railway station in Cologne, Germany

Köln Worringen
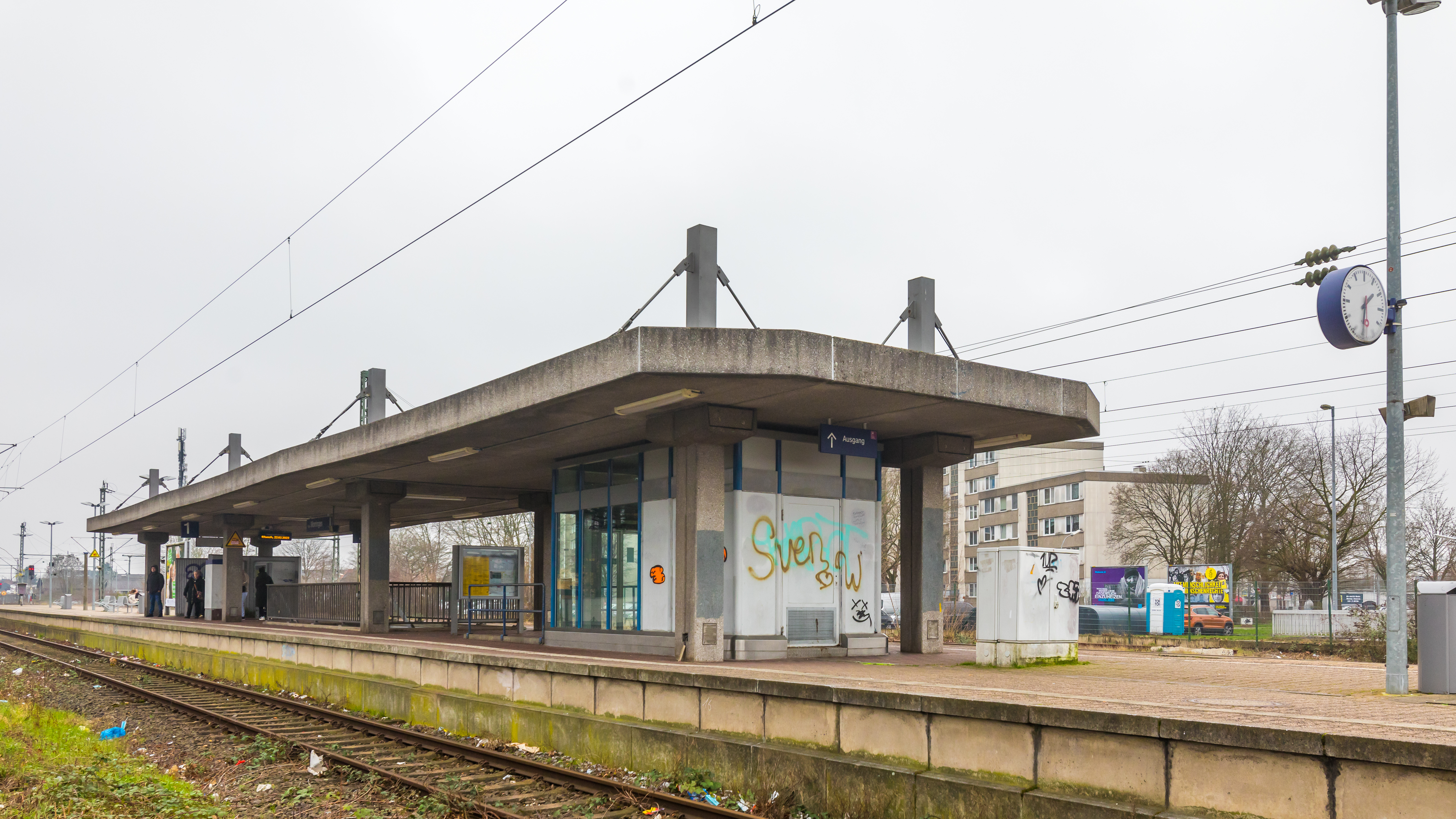
- Köln-Worringen station in 2023

General information
- Location: Bruchstr. 7, Cologne, NRW; Germany
- Coordinates: 51°03′07″N 6°51′08″E

Construction
- Accessible: Yes

Other information
- Station code: 3339
- DS100 code: KKWO
- IBNR: 8003373
- Category: 5
- Fare zone: VRS: 2100
- Website: www.bahnhof.de

History
- Opened: 15 November 1855

Services
Preceding station	Cologne S-Bahn	Following station
Dormagen Chempark towards Düsseldorf Airport Terminal	S11	Köln-Blumenberg towards Bergisch Gladbach
Location

Köln-Worringen is a railway station on the Lower Left Rhine Railway, situated in Cologne in western Germany. It is served by the S11 line of the Cologne S-Bahn at 20-minute intervals from Monday to Friday and at 30-minute intervals on the weekend.
