= Düsseldorf-Unterrath station =

Railway station in Düsseldorf, Germany

Düsseldorf Unterrath
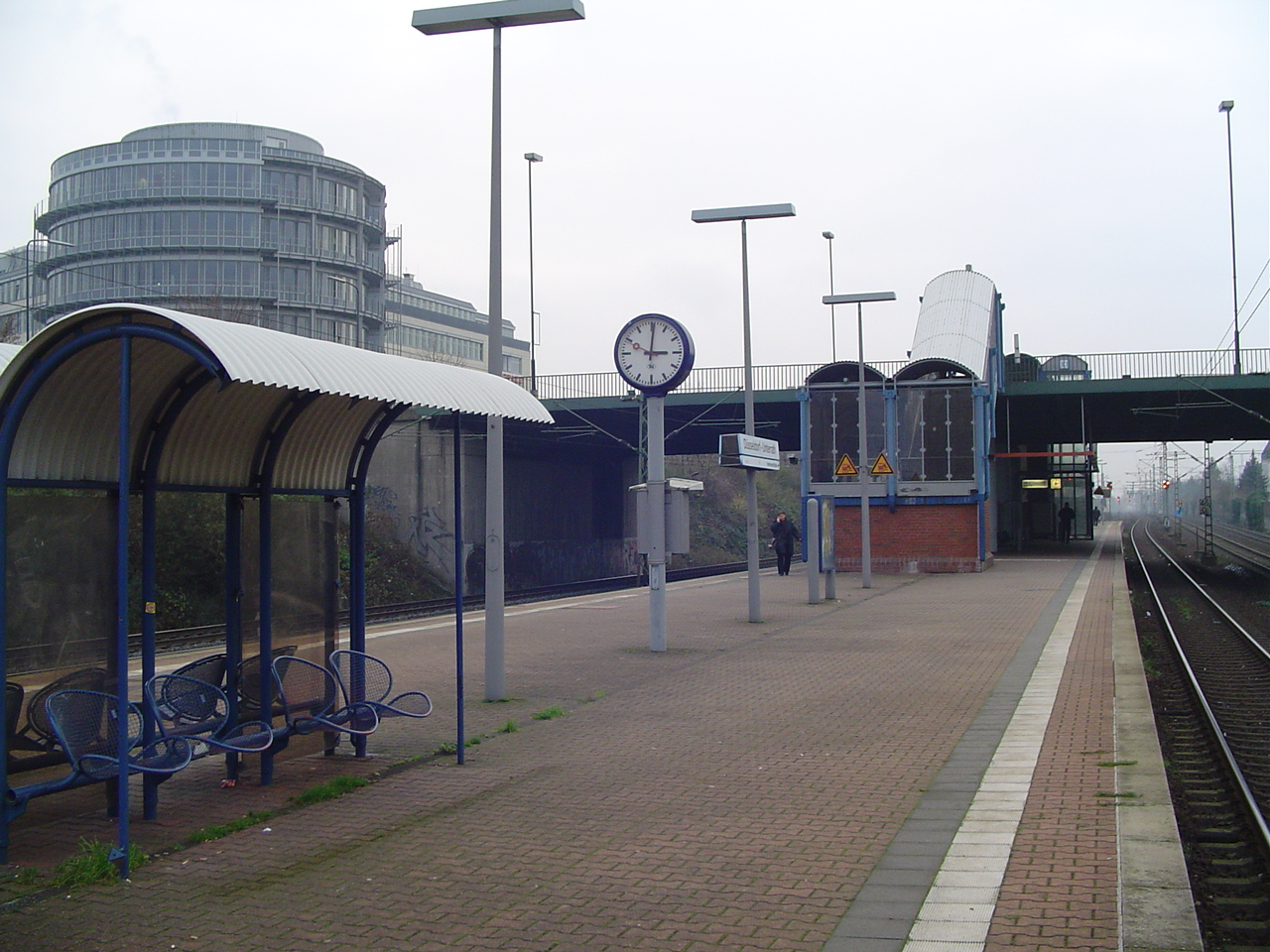

General information
- Location: Hamborner Str. 40; Düsseldorf, NRW; Germany
- Coordinates: 51°16′37.4″N 6°47′19.2″E
- Lines: Cologne–Duisburg (KBS 415)
- Platforms: 2

Construction
- Accessible: Yes

Other information
- Station code: 1420
- DS100 code: KDU
- IBNR: 8001595
- Category: 4
- Fare zone: VRR: 432; VRS: 1430 (VRR transitional zone)
- Website: www.bahnhof.de

History
- Opened: 1880

Services
Preceding station	Rhine-Ruhr S-Bahn	Following station
Düsseldorf-Derendorf towards Solingen Hbf	S1	Düsseldorf Airport towards Dortmund Hbf
Preceding station	Cologne S-Bahn	Following station
Düsseldorf-Derendorf towards Bergisch Gladbach	S11	Düsseldorf Airport Terminal Terminus
Location

Düsseldorf-Unterrath is a railway station situated at Unterrath, Düsseldorf in western Germany. It is served by Rhine-Ruhr S-Bahn line S 1 (Dortmund–Solingen) every 30 minutes and Cologne S-Bahn line S 11 (Düsseldorf Airport Terminal–Bergisch Gladbach) every 20 minutes. It is also the northern terminus of tram lines 705 and 707, operated by Rheinbahn.
