= Worringen =

- Stadtteil of Cologne
- Location within Chorweiler
- Interactive map of Worringen
- Location within Germany Location within North Rhine-Westphalia
- Coordinates: 51°3′56″N 06°51′54″E
- Country: Germany
- State: North Rhine-Westphalia
- Admin. region: Cologne
- District: Urban district
- City: Cologne
- Borough: Chorweiler

Area
  - Total: 11.72 km^{2} (4.53 sq mi)

Population (2020-12-31)
  - Total: 10,197
  - Density: 870.1/km^{2} (2,253/sq mi)
- Time zone: UTC+01:00 (CET)
  - Summer (DST): UTC+02:00 (CEST)
- Website: Stadt Köln

Worringen (German pronunciation: [ˈvɔʁɪŋən]) is a Stadtteil (quarter) of the city of Cologne, Germany. Situated 15 km north of the city centre, on the left bank of the Rhine, it is part of the district of Chorweiler. In 1288, it was the site of the Battle of Worringen. In 2009 the eastern side of the town was hit by an F1 tornado which snapped and felled some trees. It is served by the Köln-Worringen station.
