= Chorweiler =

Borough of Cologne, Germany

Chorweiler (6)
- Borough of Cologne
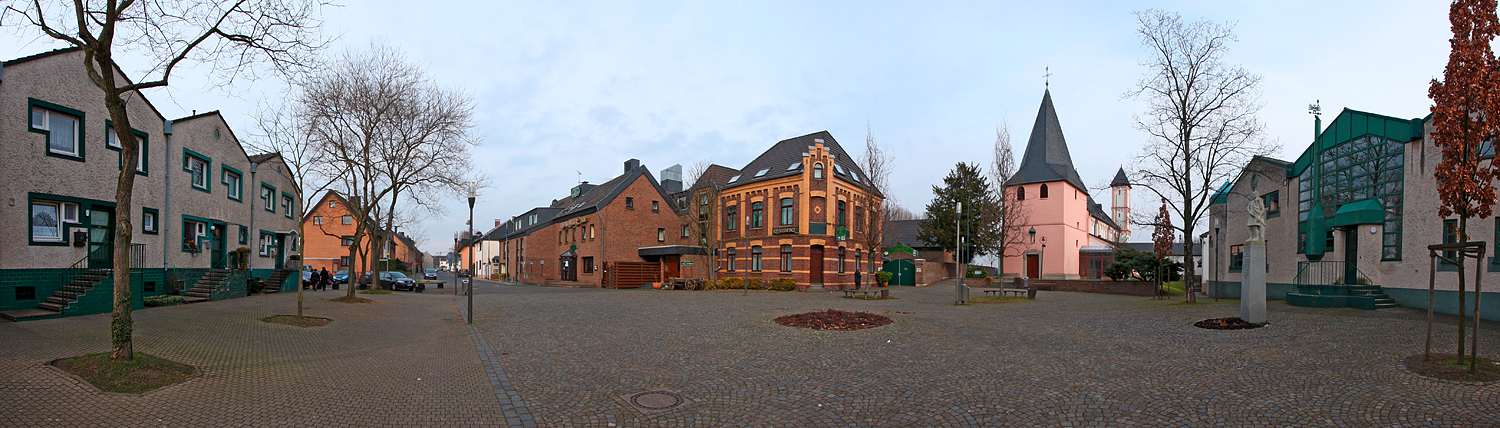
- View of Rheinkassel in Merkenich

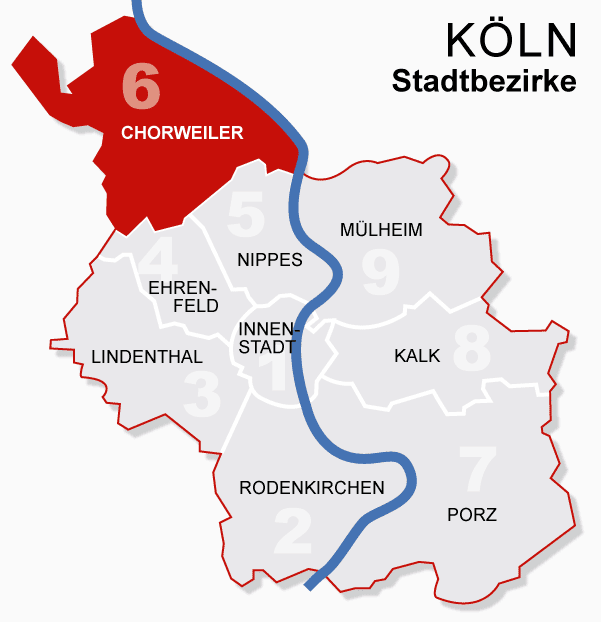
- Location within Cologne
- Interactive map of Chorweiler (6)
- Location within Germany Location within North Rhine-Westphalia
- Coordinates: 51.0438°N 6.89564°E
- Country: Germany
- State: North Rhine-Westphalia
- Admin. region: Cologne
- District: Urban district
- City: Cologne

Area
  - Total: 67.16 km^{2} (25.93 sq mi)

Population (2020-12-31)
  - Total: 82,217
  - Density: 1,224/km^{2} (3,171/sq mi)
- Time zone: UTC+01:00 (CET)
  - Summer (DST): UTC+02:00 (CEST)

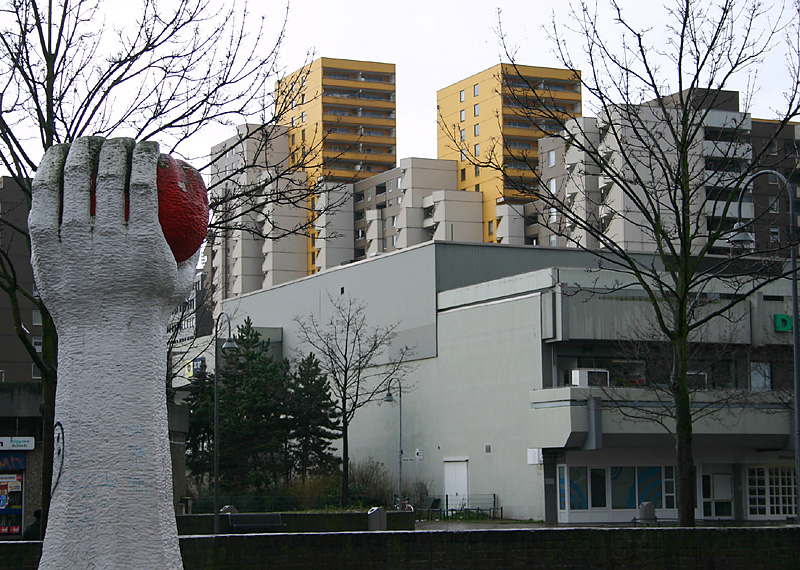
1970s Chorweiler

Chorweiler (German: Köln-Chorweiler, German pronunciation: [kɔʁvaɪlɐ]) is the sixth borough (Stadtbezirk) of Cologne, Germany. Large portion of the borough of Chorweiler were incorporated into the city of Cologne in 1922, the borough of Chorweiler was created in the 1970s. The borough has the lowest population density in Cologne and many areas are very rural.

The borough of Chorweiler borders with the Cologne boroughs of Nippes and Ehrenfeld to the South, Rhein-Erft-Kreis to the West, Rhein-Kreis Neuss to the North, and the Rhine to the East. On the other riverbank lie the city of Leverkusen and Monheim am Rhein.

== Subdivisions ==
Chorweiler consists of twelve Stadtteile (city parts):

#	City part	Population (2009)	Area (km²)	Pop. per km²	map
601	Merkenich	5,681	12,2	466	District map of Chorweiler
602	Fühlingen	2,103	4,94	426	District map of Chorweiler
603	Seeberg	11,303	1,78	6,347	District map of Chorweiler
604	Heimersdorf	5,859	1,75	3,357	District map of Chorweiler
605	Lindweiler	3,487	1,16	3,014	District map of Chorweiler
606	Pesch	7,621	2,83	2,689	District map of Chorweiler
607	Esch/Auweiler	6,455	7,61	848	District map of Chorweiler
608	Volkhoven/Weiler	6,016	4,35	1,382	District map of Chorweiler
609	Chorweiler	12,986	1,92	6,766	District map of Chorweiler
610	Blumenberg	5,894	3,22	1,829	District map of Chorweiler
611	Roggendorf/Thenhoven	3,839	13,8	279	District map of Chorweiler
612	Worringen	9,215	11,7	786	District map of Chorweiler
source: Die Kölner Stadtteile in Zahlen 2010 (in German)

== Transportation ==
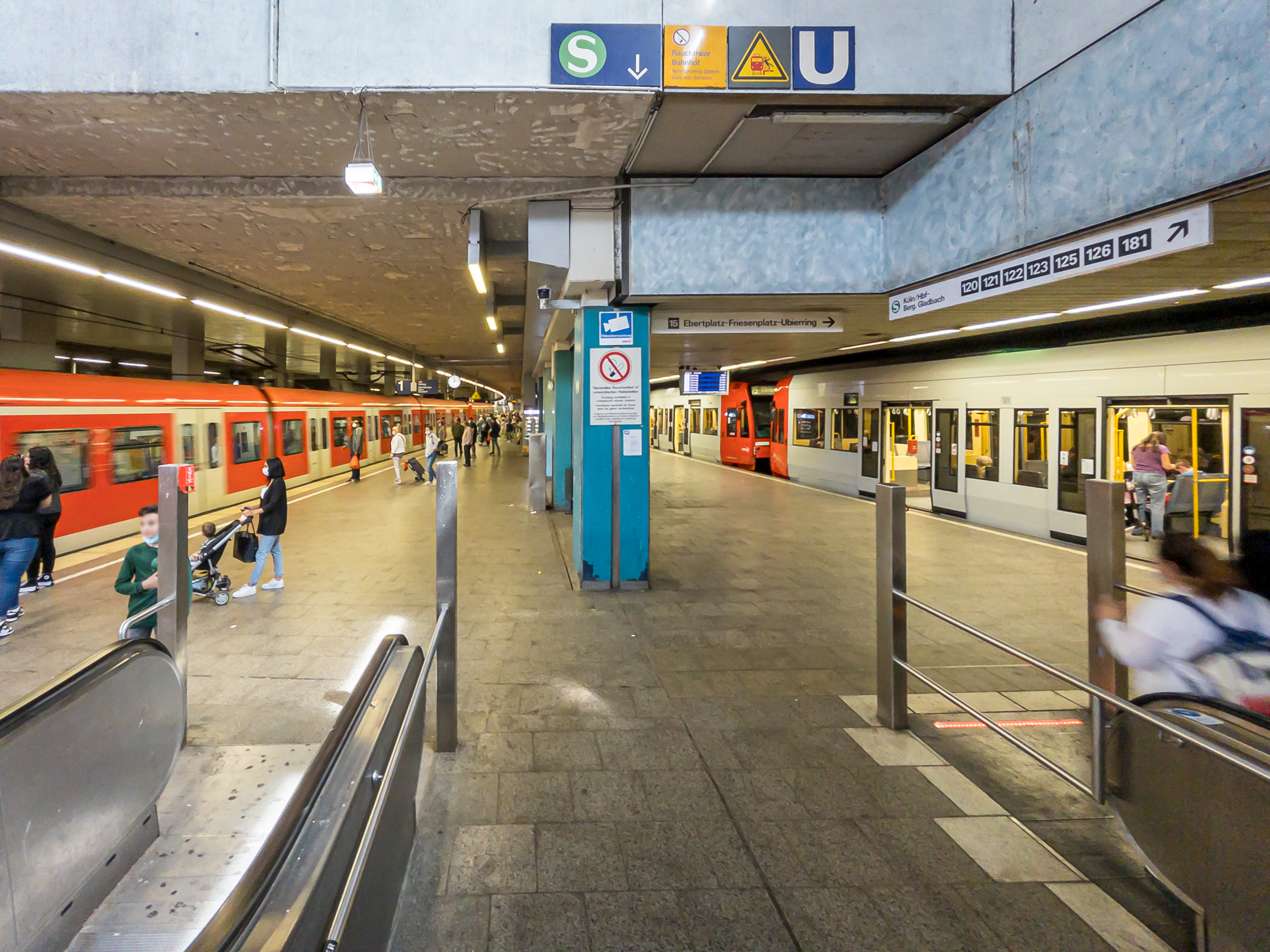
Cologne Chorweiler station

Chorweiler is served by numerous railway stations and highway. Train station include Köln-Chorweiler, Köln-Chorweiler Nord, Köln-Volkhovener Weg and Köln-Worringen, as well as numerous light rail stations of Cologne Stadtbahn line 12 and 15. The Bundesautobahn 57 connects Chorweiler with the Cologne Beltway.

=== Rhine bridges ===
- A 1 Leverkusener Brücke
