= Lower Left Rhine Railway =

Railway line in Germany and the Netherlands

Cologne–Nijmegen railway
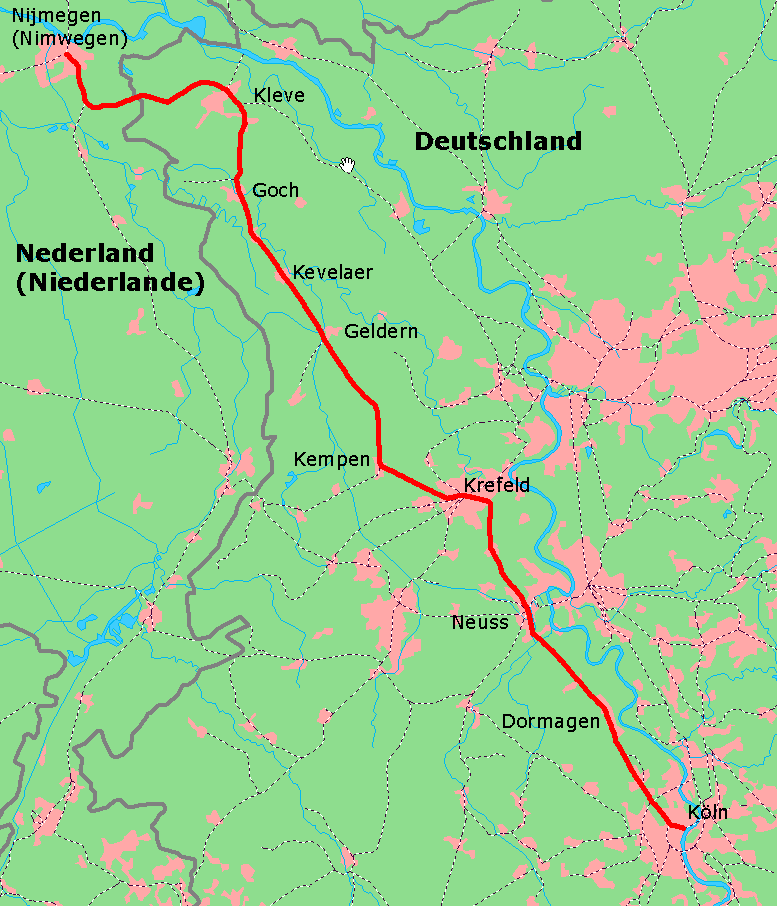

Overview
- Line number: 2610
- Locale: North Rhine-Westphalia, Germany and Netherlands

Service
- Route number: 495, 450.11

Technical
- Line length: 120 km (75 mi)

The Left Lower Rhine line (German: Linksniederrheinische Strecke) is a main line on the left (western) bank of the Rhine in the lower Rhine region of the German state of North Rhine-Westphalia, running from Cologne to Cleves (Kleve) and formerly via Kranenburg to Nijmegen in the Netherlands. The Cologne–Krefeld section of the line was opened by the Cöln-Crefeld Railway Company in 1855 and is one of the oldest lines in Germany.

The 55 km-long section from Cologne via Neuss to Krefeld is electrified and continuously multi-track. The subsequent 65 km-long Krefeld–Kleve section is non-electrified and single-track north of Geldern. The section from Kleve to Nijmegen has been closed since 1991.

Rhine-Ruhr S-Bahn line S 11 trains run on the line from Cologne to Neuss, partly on separate S-Bahn track, including a separate loop, partly underground, through the Cologne district of Chorweiler.

== History ==
=== Cologne–Kleve Section ===
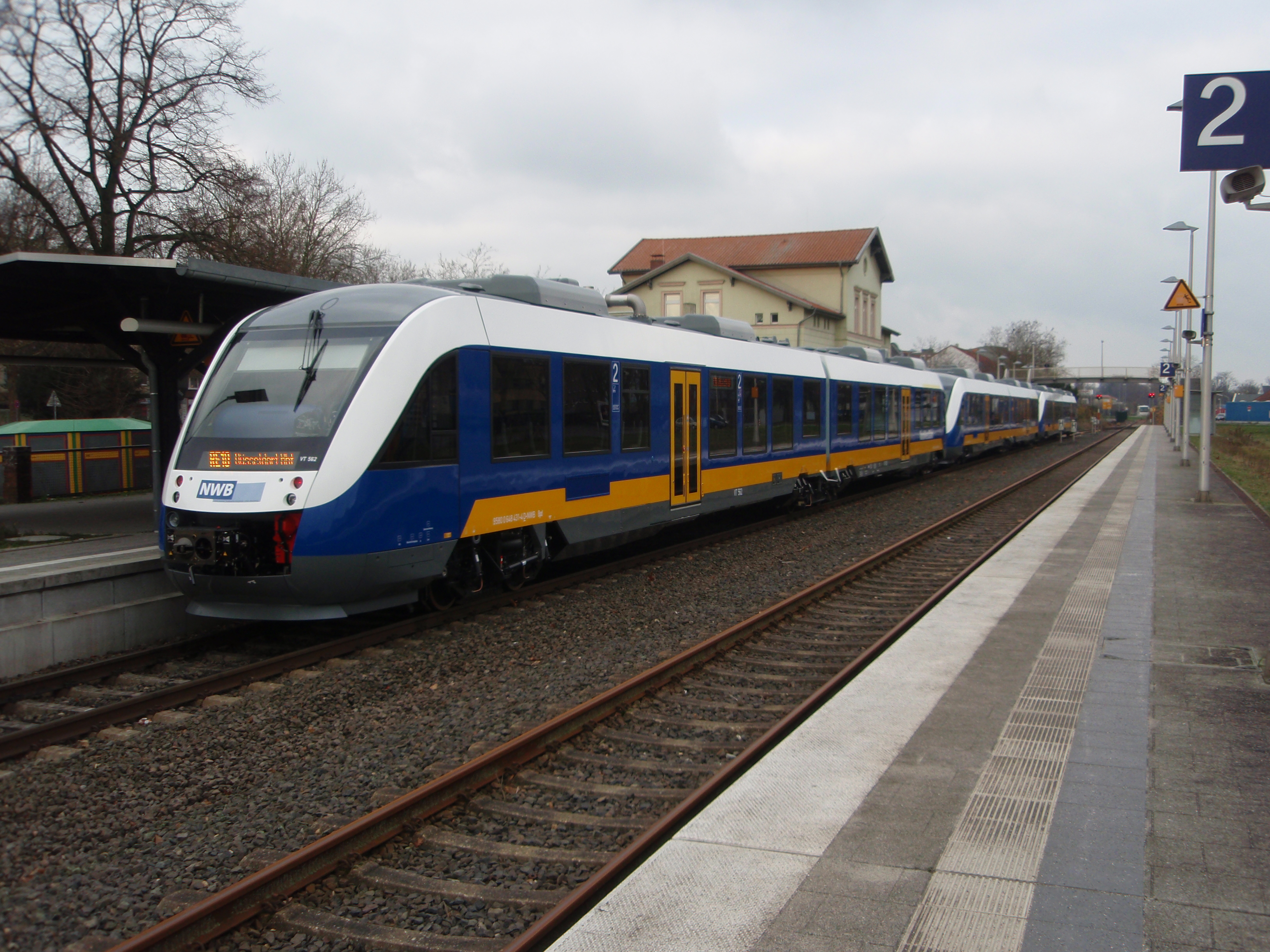
RE 10 in Kleve

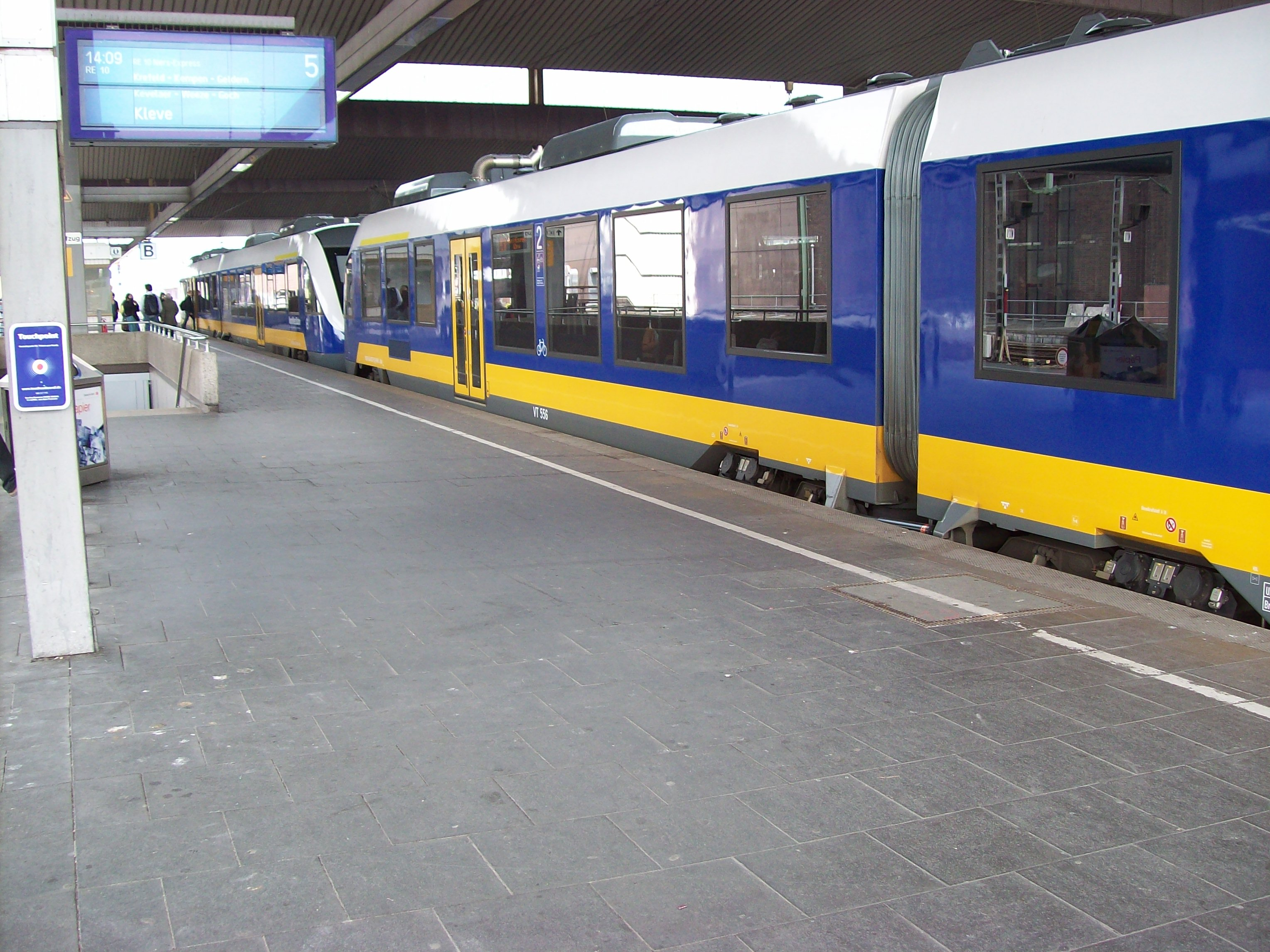
RE 10 of the Nordwestbahn in Düsseldorf Hbf

The Left Lower Rhine line was opened between Cologne and Neuss by the Cologne-Crefeld Railway Company (originally spelt in German as the Cöln-Crefelder Eisenbahn-Gesellschaft, CCE) on 15 November 1855 and extended to Krefeld—on the original direct route via Fischeln—on 26 January 1856. The current route via Krefeld-Oppum was opened on 23 August 1866. The Rhenish Railway Company (Rheinische Eisenbahn-Gesellschaft, RhE) entered into a contract with the Cologne-Crefelder Railway Company on 11 November 1859 to take over its route from Cologne to Krefeld on 1 July 1860, making it possible to extend the Left Lower Rhine line to the north with a connection to the Dutch rail network and the Dutch ports. The section to Kleve opened on 1 March 1863.

=== Kleve–Netherlands section ===
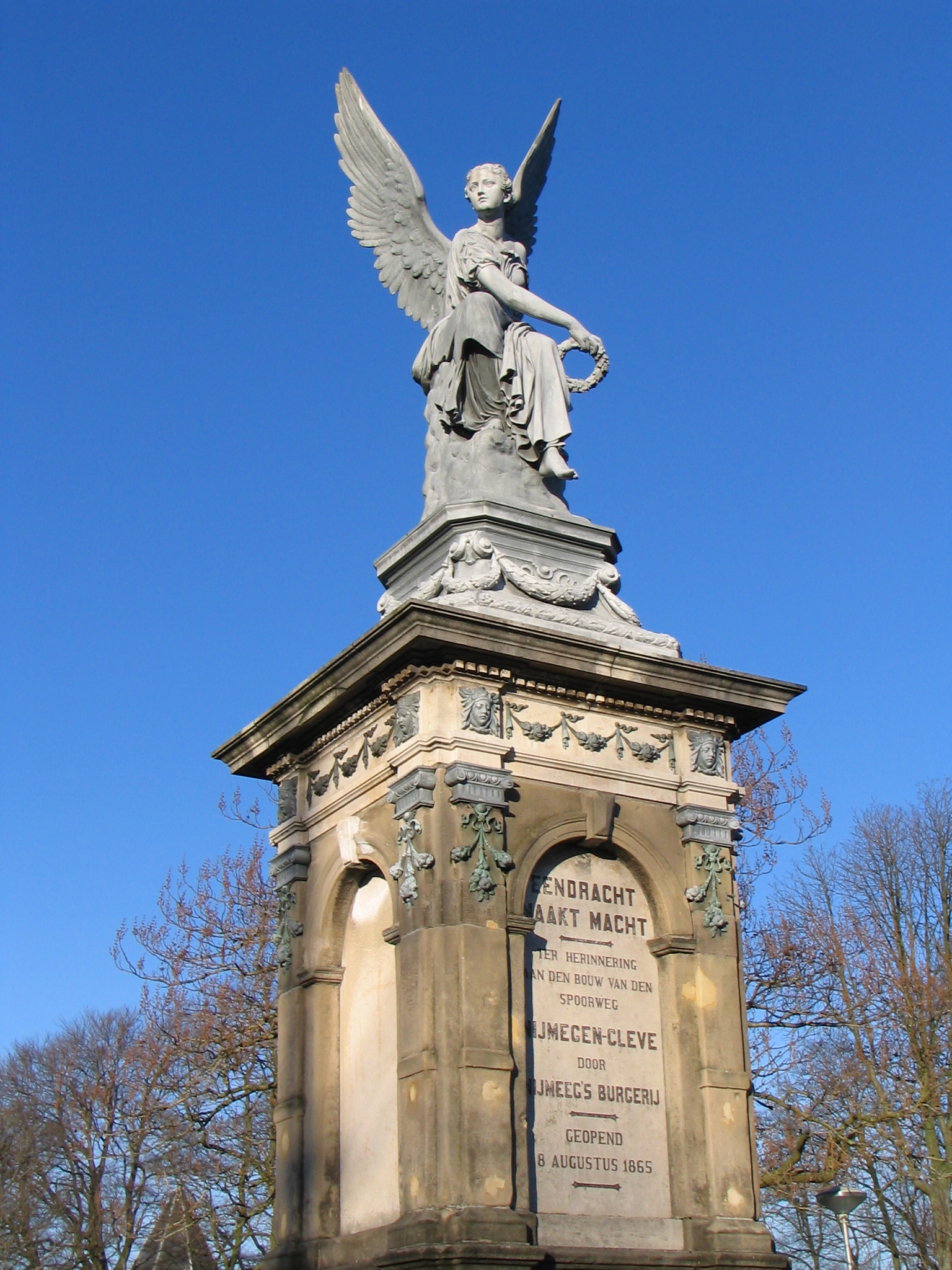
Railway memorial in Nijmegen (1884)

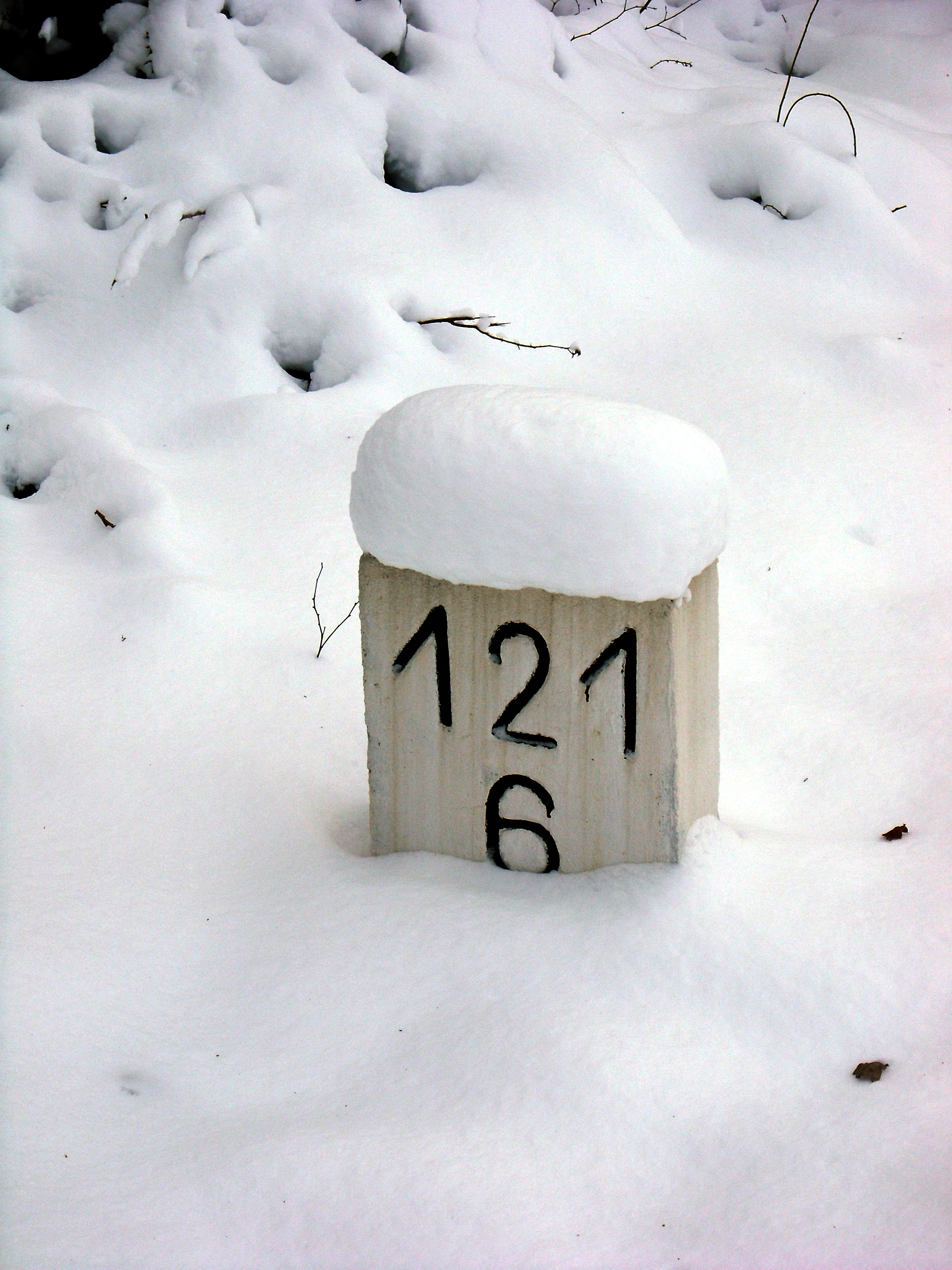
Railtrack Kranenburg - Kleve, near Donsbrüggen. Kilometer 121,6

A ten-kilometre continuation of the line over the Griethausen railway bridge and the Spyck–Welle train ferry to the Dutch border was opened on 19 April 1865 for freight and on 21 April 1865 for passengers. At the same time the RhE encouraged the Dutch Rhine Railway Company (Dutch: Nederlandsche Rhijnspoorweg-Maatschappij, NRS) to extend its railway, which already ran from Rotterdam and Amsterdam to Utrecht and Arnhem, to the Dutch–German border. In 1856 the Cologne-Minden Railway Company (Cöln-Mindener Eisenbahn-Gesellschaft, CME) had opened its line to Emmerich via Oberhausen (the Holland route), but it lacked rail connections to southern Germany, Austria and Switzerland.

This prompted the NRS to discuss a rail link via Cleves with the Rhenish railway, which had extended its West Rhine line to Bingen in 1859 to create a connection with the southern German rail network. Both companies attempted to persuade the Dutch government to grant a concession to the Rhenish railway for the construction of a route from Kleve to Nijmegen and Arnhem but failed to change the Dutch government's policy. Even an offer by the Rhenish railway to build at its own expense the big bridges that would have been required over the Waal and the Rhine had no effect. Probably the major concern for the Dutch government was the protection of navigation on the Rhine in the Netherlands and the fact that the majority of the capital of the NRS was controlled by English investors.

Until the nationalisation of the company in 1880, all RhE freight and passenger trains ran to the Dutch North Sea ports via the Kleve–Zevenaar route. In 1912, the tracks to the ramps on both sides of the train ferry were closed. Passengers were instead transferred by steamboat. During World War I the line was reduced to two pairs of trains per day. After the war, the Dutch railways (later formally amalgamated as Nederlandse Spoorwegen, NS) and the German State Railways signed an agreement in relation to the operation of rail and ferry services up to 31 August 1926. Around 1930 the tracks between Welle and Elten on the right (northern) bank were dismantled. In contrast, on the left bank passenger services continued until 1960 and freight ran directly to a vegetable oil mill on the Rhine in Spyck until 1987. At that time, the line from Kleve was closed.

On 9 September 1865 a further link from Cleves to Nijmegen was put into operation. In 1879 this line was connected to the Dutch rail network in Arnhem. From 18 September 1965 the section between Kleve and the border was reduced from double track to single track. No passenger trains have run on the line to Nijmegen since 1991 and the line has been out of service since 1999. Freight operations have been closed between Kleve and Kranenburg since 31 December 1991.

Since 27 April 2008, the section from Kleve via Kranenburg to Groesbeek has been used for the operation of draisines for entertainment.

=== S-Bahn ===
Line S 11 of the Rhine-Ruhr S-Bahn was put into operation from Cologne Hbf to Köln-Chorweiler on 1 June 1975 as the first S-Bahn line in Cologne. On 22 May 1977, a new section was opened to Köln-Chorweiler Nord, running underground through Chorweiler. In June 1985 this was extended to Köln-Worringen, where the S-Bahn line has a grade-separated connection with the main line, and line S 11 continues to Neuss. This was the beginning of the integration of the Rhine-Ruhr and the Rhine-Sieg S-Bahn networks.

=== Crossing lines ===
From west to east, the Left Lower Rhine line was crossed by now disused railways in Goch, Geldern and Kempen. The North Brabant-German Railway Company (Dutch: Noord-Brabantsch-Duitsche Spoorweg-Maatschappij, NBDS) built a line for long-distance trains running from London to Berlin and London to Hamburg from Boxtel in the Netherlands via Gennep and Goch to Wesel (the Boxtel Railway). The Haltern–Venlo section of the Paris-Hamburg Railway, which ran from Venlo via Wesel to Hamburg, crossed in Geldern; this was opened by the Cologne-Minden Railway Company in 1874. The Rhenish Railway Company opened a line from Kempen to Venlo via Kaldenkirchen in 1867. The narrow gauge Geldern District Railway (Geldernsche Kreisbahn) was opened in 1901 and 1902 from Kempen via Straelen to Kevelaer to improve access to the agricultural land west of the Left Lower Rhine line; it was closed in 1934.

== Current operations ==
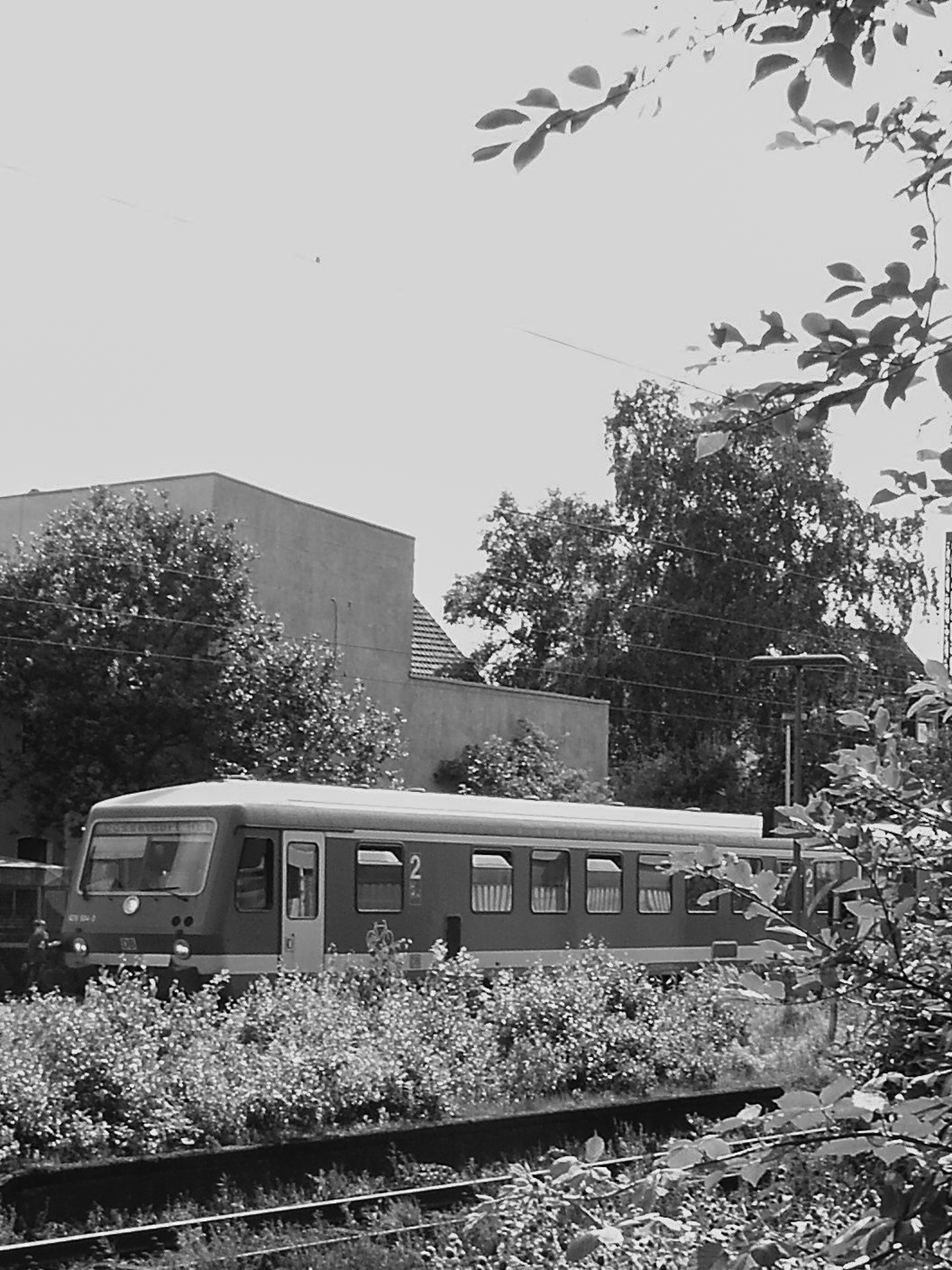
Niers-Express in Krefeld-Oppum before NordWestBahn took over operations

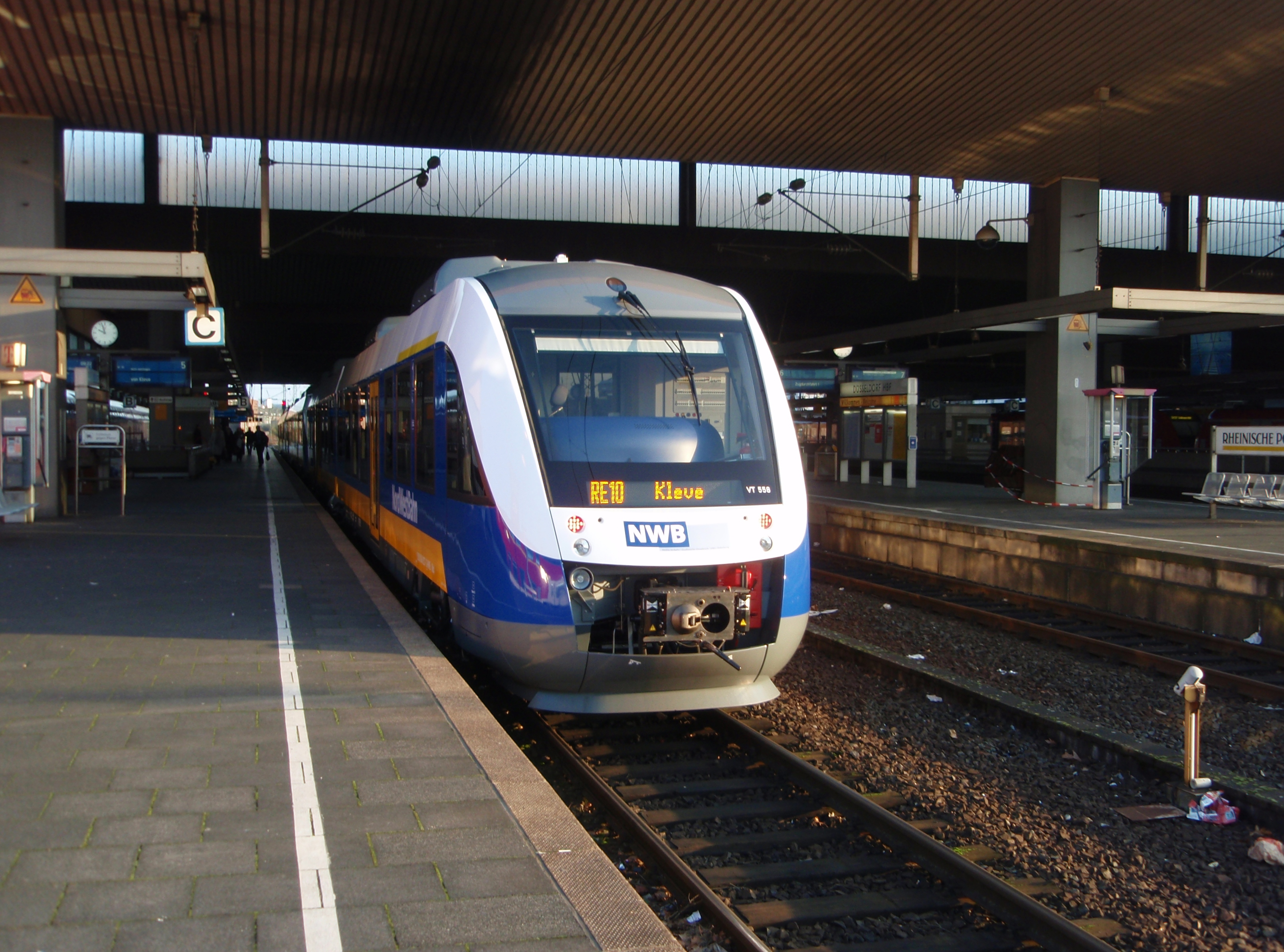
NWB VT558 in Düsseldorf Hbf

The Meerbusch-Osterath–Cleves section of the Left Lower Rhine line is served by a Regional-Express service, the Niers-Express (RE 10) on the Kleve–Krefeld–Düsseldorf route every 30 minutes during the day and evening from Monday to Friday and hourly on weekends and public holidays. It connects hourly in Krefeld with the Rhein-Münsterland-Express (RE 7) on the Krefeld–Neuss–Cologne–Wuppertal–Hagen–Hamm–Münster–Rheine route. Since the Kleve–Geldern section has only one track, services of the Niers-Express running towards Krefeld have to stop for four minutes at the crossing stations of Bedburg-Hau and Weeze. The total time taken by trains running in the opposite direction is eight minutes less. Despite the service's classification as a Regional-Express, the Niers-Express serves all stations between Meerbusch-Osterath and Kleve. The average speed is only 66 km/h. All stations on the line have at least two tracks and can serve as crossing stations.

The Rhein-Münsterland-Express was formerly operated by DB Regio NRW, using push-pull trains that are composed of four double-deck coaches hauled by class 112 electric locomotives. Since December 2015, it has been operated by National Express using Bombardier Talent 2 electric multiple units.

The Niers-Express services were taken over by NordWestBahn in December 2009, and are operated using one to three part LINT 41 diesel multiple units with a top speed of 120 km / h. NordWestBahn was taken over by Transdev and is now called the RheinRuhrBahn.
