= S11 (Cologne S-Bahn) =

German commuter rail line

Line S 11 is a S-Bahn line operated by DB Regio on the Cologne S-Bahn network. It connects Düsseldorf Airport Terminal with Bergisch Gladbach, running via Düsseldorf Neuss, Dormagen and Cologne. Before 13 December 2009, the service operated from Wuppertal-Vohwinkel in peak time, sharing the Wuppertal-Düsseldorf run with the S8 trains. Normal operation, though, started at Düsseldorf-Wehrhahn. Since the introduction of the new 2010 Schedule the service starts at Düsseldorf Airport Terminal replacing the line S 7 to Düsseldorf Hbf. The former run to Wuppertal-Vohwinkel is now conducted by the S 68.

The S11 runs are normally operated with DBAG Class 423 stock, usually with two coupled sets per train.

The Line runs over lines built by various railway companies:

- from Düsseldorf Airport Terminal to Düsseldorf-Unterrath over the Düsseldorf-Unterrath–Düsseldorf Airport Terminal railway, opened on 27 October 1975 by Deutsche Bundesbahn,
- from Düsseldorf-Unterrath to Düsseldorf Hauptbahnhof over the Cologne–Duisburg railway, opened by the Cologne-Minden Railway Company on 9 February 1846,
- from Düsseldorf Hauptbahnhof to Neuss Hauptbahnhof over the deviation of the Mönchengladbach–Düsseldorf railway over the Hamm Railway Bridge, opened by the Bergisch-Märkische Railway Company on 24 July 1870,
- from Neuss Hauptbahnhof to Köln-Worringen over the Lower Left Rhine Railway, opened by the Cöln-Crefeld Railway Company on 15 November 1855,
- from Köln-Worringen to Köln–Hansaring over the Cologne–Köln-Worringen railway, opened by Deutsche Bundesbahn in stages from 1 June 1975 to 2 June 1985 as part of the S-Bahn,
- from Köln–Hansaring to Cologne Hauptbahnhof over a section of the Cologne–Aachen line opened by the Rhenish Railway Company on 15 October 1859 with the opening of the new central station,
- from Cologne Hauptbahnhof to Köln Messe/Deutz over the new S-Bahn tracks opened on 28 May 1989 and 26 May 1990 next to the original Hohenzollern Bridge opened on 22 May 1911, which replaced the Cathedral Bridge, opened by the Cologne-Minden Railway Company on 3 October 1859,
- from Köln Messe/Deutz to Köln-Mülheim over the Cologne–Duisburg railway, opened by the Cologne-Minden Railway Company on 20 December 1845,
- from Köln-Mülheim to Bergisch Gladbach over the Sülz Valley Railway, opened by the Bergisch-Märkische Railway Company on 15 December 1868.

Services commenced between Cologne and Köln-Chorweiler on 1 June 1975 and extended to Köln-Chorweiler Nord on 22 May 1977. Services were extended to Neuss on 2 June 1985, to Düsseldorf-Gerresheim/Düsseldorf Wehrhahn on 29 May 1988, to Wuppertal-Vohwinkel. On 13 December 2009, it was extended to Düsseldorf Airport Terminal, dropping the fork to Wuppertal-Vohwinkel.
