= Düsseldorf Airport Terminal station =

Railway station in Düsseldorf, Germany

Düsseldorf Flughafen Terminal
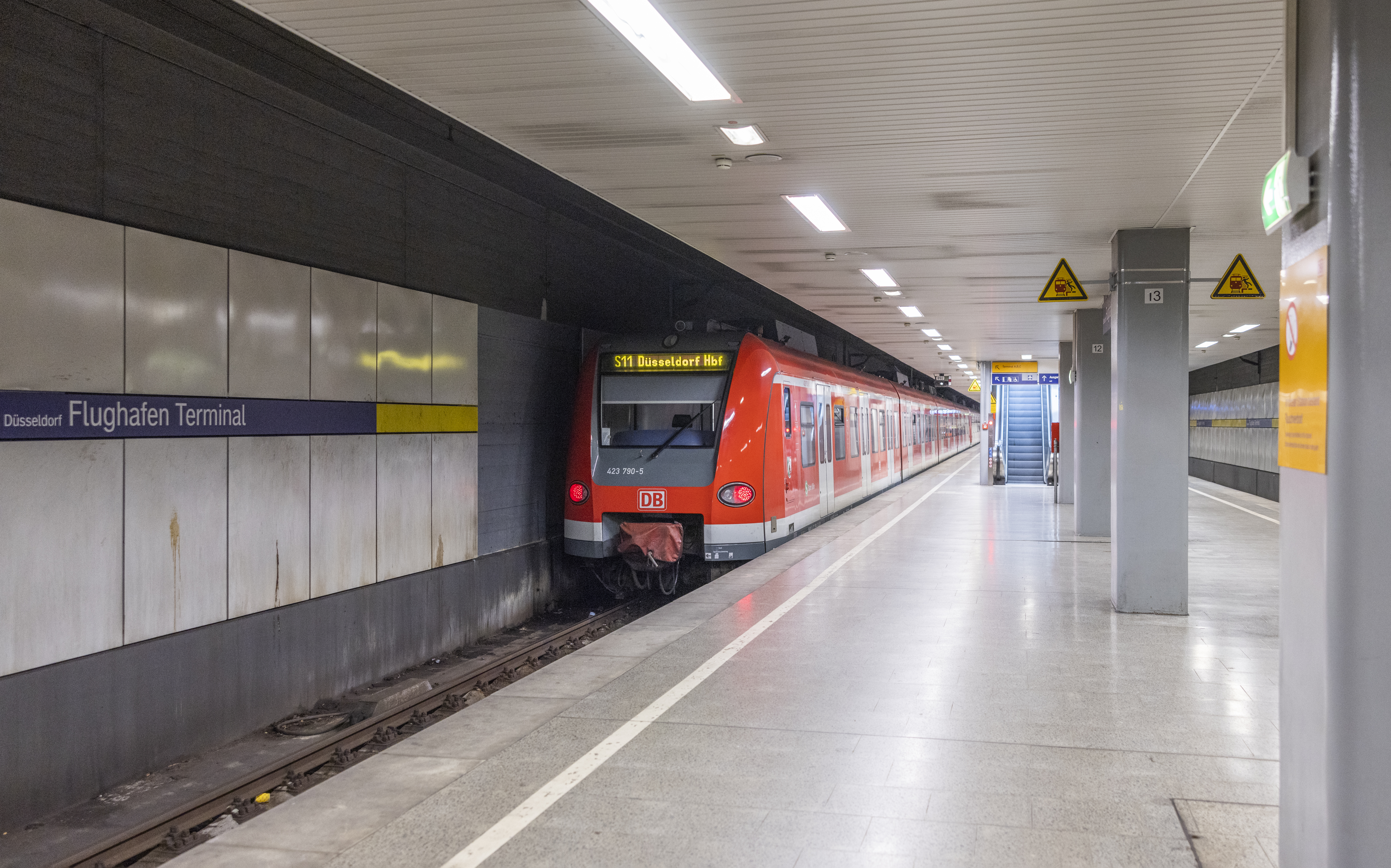

General information
- Location: Düsseldorf, NRW; Germany
- Coordinates: 51°16′45″N 6°46′06″E
- Owner: Deutsche Bahn
- Operator: DB InfraGO
- Lines: Düsseldorf Airport Terminal railway (KBS 450.11)
- Platforms: 2

Construction
- Accessible: Yes

Other information
- Station code: n/a
- DS100 code: KDF
- Category: 4
- Fare zone: VRR: 432; VRS: 1430 (VRR transitional zone)
- Website: bahnhof.de

History
- Opened: 1975

Passengers
- 20,000–25,000

Services
Preceding station	Cologne S-Bahn	Following station
Düsseldorf-Unterrath towards Bergisch Gladbach	S11	Terminus
Location

Düsseldorf Airport Terminal (Düsseldorf Flughafen Terminal) is an underground station on the Cologne S-Bahn at the end of the Düsseldorf-Unterrath–Düsseldorf Airport Terminal railway, situated underneath Terminal C of Düsseldorf Airport, Düsseldorf in western Germany. It is served by line S11.

The station was opened in 1975 and was served by S-Bahn line S7 until 13 December 2009, when the line was closed and line S11 was extended to the station.
