= Cologne S-Bahn =

S-Bahn network in and around Cologne, Germany

- Current transit map of the S-Bahn Cologne

Overview
- Native name: German: Köln S-Bahn
- Locale: North Rhine-Westphalia
- Transit type: S-Bahn
- Number of lines: 4

Operation
- Began operation: 1 June 1975

The Cologne S-Bahn (German: S-Bahn Köln) is an S-Bahn network in the German state of North Rhine-Westphalia. It is centered on Cologne and began operation in 1975.

== History ==
The Cologne S-Bahn was inaugurated on 1 June 1975 with the S11, which ran every 20 minutes between Bergisch Gladbach and Köln-Chorweiler.

== Lines ==
As of December 2024 the network consists of the following lines:

- S11: Düsseldorf Airport Terminal–Bergisch Gladbach
- S12: Horrem–Au (Sieg)
- S19: Düren–Au (Sieg)
- S23: Euskirchen–Bonn

== See also ==
- Cologne Stadtbahn
- Rhine-Ruhr S-Bahn
- Rail transport in Germany
