= Bergisch Gladbach station =

Railway station in Bergisch Gladbach, Germany

Bergisch Gladbach
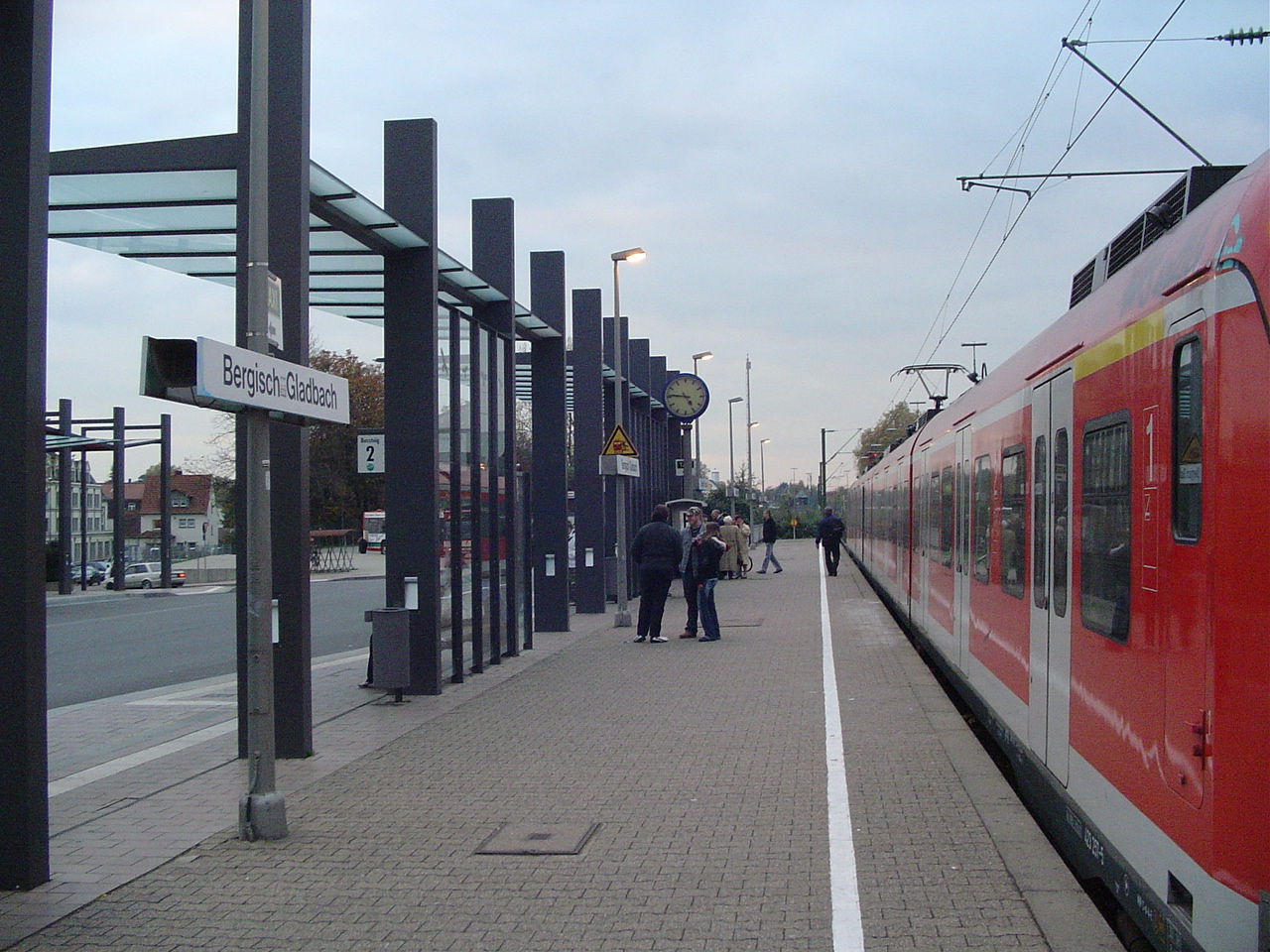

General information
- Location: Johann Wilhelm Lindlarstr. 11, Bergisch Gladbach, NRW; Germany
- Coordinates: 50°59′29″N 7°7′28″E
- Lines: Sülz Valley Railway (KBS 450.11)
- Platforms: 1

Construction
- Accessible: Yes

Other information
- Station code: 512
- DS100 code: KBGG
- IBNR: 8000899
- Category: 5
- Fare zone: VRS: 2310
- Website: www.bahnhof.de

History
- Opened: 1868

Services
Preceding station	Cologne S-Bahn	Following station
Terminus	S11	Duckterath towards Düsseldorf Airport Terminal
Location
- Location within North Rhine-Westphalia

Bergisch Gladbach station is a terminal station and forms the public transport hub of the city of Bergisch Gladbach, in the German state of North Rhine-Westphalia. It has been the terminus of line S 11 of the Rhine-Sieg S-Bahn (now part of the Cologne S-Bahn) since 1 June 1975. This service now runs via Cologne, Neuss and Düsseldorf to Düsseldorf Airport Terminal station. It also includes the city’s freight yard. The section of the Sülz Valley Railway between Köln-Mülheim station and Bergisch Gladbach is electrified. The station is classified by Deutsche Bahn as a category 5 station.

The station has eight operable tracks, one with a platform and overhead wiring for S-Bahn traffic, the rest serve the freight yard. Other tracks in the freight yard and sidings are no longer needed and have been dismantled or are no longer used. The station entrance is controlled by a historic mechanical signal box, which has been in use since 1911 and is now a heritage-listed building. Adjacent to the S-Bahn platform is a bus station with 14 bus bays, which is served by 20 bus lines during the day and 6 night bus lines.

== History ==
The station was opened in 1868, together with the Köln-Mülheim–Bergisch Gladbach line. In 1870, a line was built from the entrance of Bergisch Gladbach station to Bensberg, requiring trains running to Bensberg to reverse in the station. Due to the increased size of the station a signal box was opened in 1890 at the station entrance on the island between the line to Köln-Mülheim, the line to Bensberg and the Tannenbergstraße level crossing. From 1912 until 1960 there was a connecting curve at Gronau junction so that reversal at the station could be avoided. During the establishment of the Rhine-Sieg S-Bahn, the Sülz Valley Railway between Köln-Mülheim and Bergisch Gladbach was electrified in 1974-75. Electrification in Bergisch Gladbach station itself, however, was limited to the track serving S-Bahn platform and one other track, which has since been closed.
