= Verkehrsverbund Rhein-Sieg =

Transit district in the Rhine-Sieg area, Germany

Verkehrsverbund Rhein-Sieg

Ridership between 1996 and 2012

Verkehrsverbund Rhein-Sieg (VRS), in English Rhine-Sieg Transport Association, is the public transport association covering the area of the Cologne Bonn Region, North Rhine-Westphalia, Germany. Besides Aachener Verkehrsverbund (AVV), VRS belongs to the special purpose association go.Rheinland.

It was founded on 1 September 1987 and covers an area of some 5,111 km^{2} (1,973 sq mi) with around 3.5 million inhabitants. Verkehrsverbund Rhein-Sieg is named after the rivers Rhein and Sieg.

== Associated transport companies ==
The following transport companies operate within the area of Verkehrsverbund Rhein-Sieg:

- Bahnen der Stadt Monheim (BSM)
- DB Regio Bus NRW (BVR Busverkehr Rheinland)
- Kreis Euskirchen Verkehrsunternehmen
- go.Rheinland
- Kölner Verkehrs-Betriebe (KVB)
- National Express Rail (NX)
- Oberbergische Verkehrsgesellschaft (OVAG)
- Rhein-Erft-Verkehrsgesellschaft (REVG)
- Rhein-Sieg-Verkehrsgesellschaft (RSVG)
- Regionalverkehr Köln (RVK)
- Stadtbus Dormagen (SDG)
- Stadtverkehr Euskirchen (SVE)
- Stadtwerke Bonn Verkehrs GmbH (SWB)
- Stadtwerke Brühl Verkehrs GmbH (STWBV)
- Stadtwerke Hürth (SWH)
- Stadtwerke Wesseling (SWW)
- Trans Regio Deutsche Regionalbahn (TR)
- wupsi

== Cities and districts in the VRS area ==
The following destinations belong to the VRS area:

- cities
  - Köln
  - Bonn
  - Leverkusen
  - Monheim
- districts
  - Rhein-Erft-Kreis
  - Rhein-Sieg-Kreis
  - Rheinisch-Bergischer Kreis
  - Oberbergischer Kreis
  - Kreis Euskirchen
