= Köln Hauptbahnhof =

Railway station in Cologne, North Rhine-Westphalia, Germany

Köln Hbf
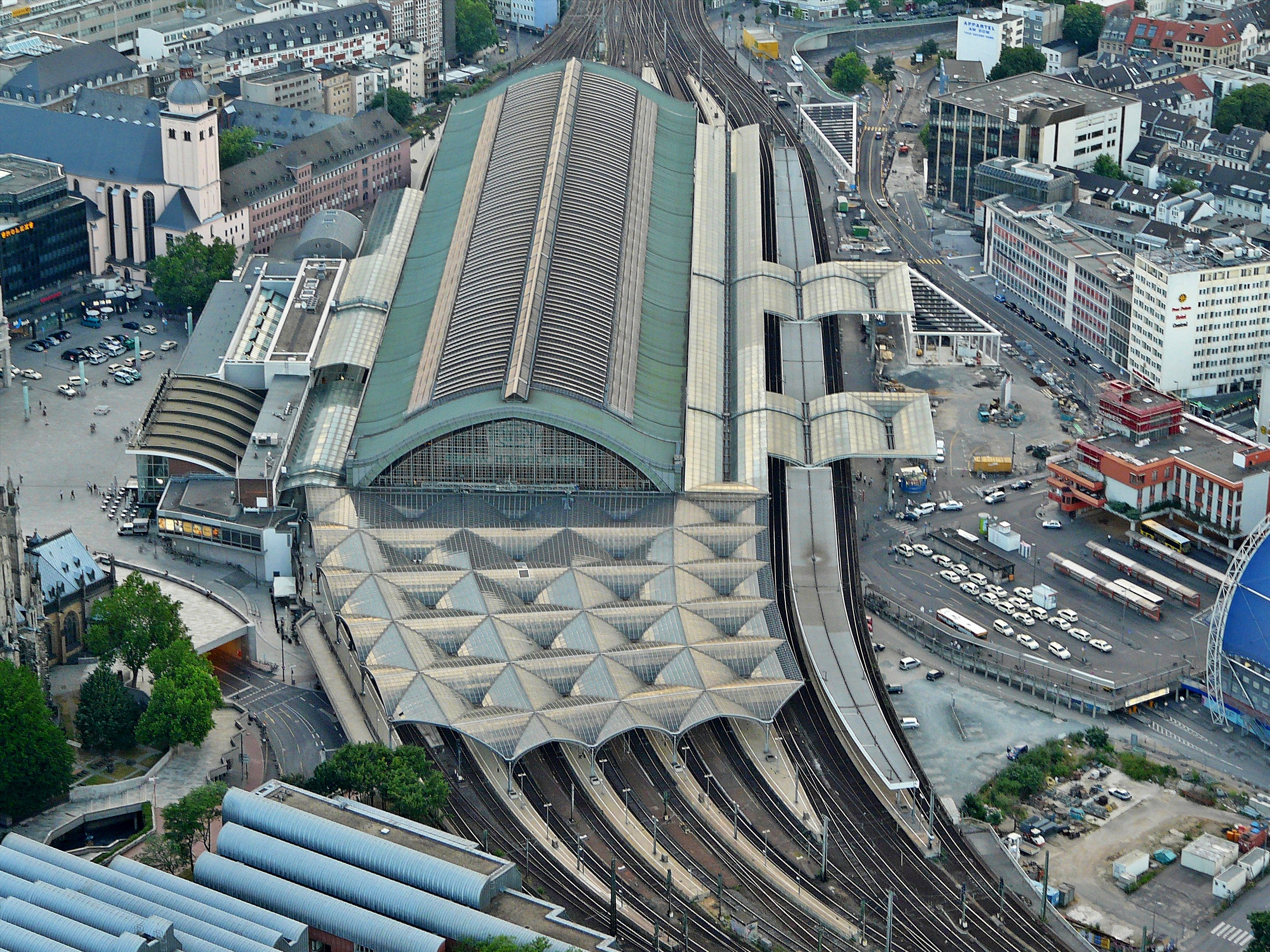
- Aerial view in 2010

General information
- Location: Innenstadt, Cologne, North Rhine-Westphalia; Germany
- Coordinates: 50°56′33″N 6°57′29″E
- Owner: Deutsche Bahn
- Operator: DB Netz; DB Station&Service
- Lines: Cologne–Frankfurt high-speed; Cologne–Krefeld; Cologne–Aachen; West Rhine line; Cologne–Duisburg; Cologne–Sieg; Cologne–Wuppertal
- Platforms: 11: 9 long distance and regional; 2 S-Bahn; 4 (2 stops) Stadtbahn

Construction
- Accessible: Yes

Other information
- Station code: 3320
- DS100 code: KK
- IBNR: 8000207
- Category: 1
- Fare zone: VRS: 2100
- Website: www.bahnhof.de

History
- Opened: 5 December 1859; 166 years ago
- Electrified: 17 November 1958; 67 years ago, 15 kV 16 2/3 Hz AC system (overhead)
- Former names: 1859-1894 Cöln Centralbahnhof; 1894-1919 Cöln Hauptbahnhof

Key dates
- 1894: rebuilt
- 1957: rebuilt

Passengers
- 280,000
Services
Preceding station	Eurostar	Following station
Aachen Hbf towards Paris-Nord	Eurostar	Düsseldorf Hbf towards Dortmund Hbf
Preceding station	DB Fernverkehr	Following station
Bonn Hbf towards Passau Hbf	ICE 1 Sprinter	Düsseldorf Hbf towards Hamburg-Altona
Bonn Hbf Terminus	ICE 9 Sprinter	Berlin-Spandau towards Berlin Ostbahnhof or Berlin Südkreuz
Terminus	ICE 10	Düsseldorf Hbf towards Berlin Ostbahnhof
Terminus	ICE 10	Solingen Hbf towards Berlin Ostbahnhof
Düren towards Aachen Hbf	ICE 14	Düsseldorf Hbf towards Berlin Ostbahnhof
Bonn Hbf towards Koblenz Hbf	ICE 19	Wuppertal Hbf towards Berlin Ostbahnhof
Düren One-way operation	ICE 19	Wuppertal Hbf towards Berlin Ostbahnhof
Terminus	ICE 33	Düsseldorf Hbf towards Westerland (Sylt)
Terminus	IC 35	Düsseldorf Hbf towards Norddeich Mole or Emden Außenhafen
Siegburg/Bonn towards München Hbf	ICE 42 reverses out	Düsseldorf Hbf towards Hamburg-Altona
Düsseldorf Hbf towards Amsterdam Centraal	ICE 43 reverses out	Siegburg/Bonn towards Basel SBB, Chur or Brig
Düsseldorf Hbf towards Hamburg-Altona	ICE 43 reverses out	Siegburg/Bonn towards Basel SBB, Chur or Brig
Terminus	ICE 45	Köln/Bonn Flughafen towards Stuttgart Hbf or Frankfurt (Main) Hbf
Terminus	ICE 49	Siegburg/Bonn towards Frankfurt (Main) Hbf
Düsseldorf Hbf towards Gera Hbf	IC 51	Terminus
Solingen Hbf towards Dresden Hbf	IC 55	Bonn Hbf towards Stuttgart Hbf
Düsseldorf Hbf towards Dortmund Hbf	IC 55 Allgäu	Bonn Hbf towards Oberstdorf
Düsseldorf Hbf towards Amsterdam Centraal	ICE 78 reverses out	Frankfurt Airport towards München Hbf
Aachen Hbf towards Antwerpen-Centraal or Brussels-South	ICE 79	Siegburg/Bonn towards Frankfurt (Main) Hbf
Bonn Hbf towards Wien Hbf	ICE 91 train route rejoins here	Düsseldorf Hbf towards Dortmund Hbf
Bonn Hbf towards Wien Hbf	ICE 91 train route rejoins here	Solingen Hbf towards Dortmund Hbf
Preceding station	ÖBB	Following station
Bonn Hbf towards Zürich HB	Nightjet	Düsseldorf Hbf towards Amsterdam Centraal
Preceding station		Following station
Terminus	FLX 20	Düsseldorf Hbf towards Hamburg Hbf
Aachen Hbf Terminus	FLX 30	Düsseldorf Hbf towards Leipzig Hbf
Preceding station	DB Regio NRW	Following station
Köln-Ehrenfeld towards Mönchengladbach Hbf	RE 8	Köln Messe/Deutz towards Koblenz Hbf
Köln-Ehrenfeld towards Aachen Hbf	RE 9	Köln Messe/Deutz towards Siegen Hbf
Köln-West towards Trier Hbf	RE 12	Köln Messe/Deutz Terminus
Köln-West towards Gerolstein	RE 22	Köln Messe/Deutz Terminus
Köln-West towards Gerolstein	RB 24	Köln Messe/Deutz Terminus
Köln Hansaring Terminus	RB 25	Köln Messe/Deutz towards Lüdenscheid
Köln-Ehrenfeld towards Mönchengladbach Hbf	RB 27	Köln Messe/Deutz towards Koblenz Hbf
Köln-Ehrenfeld towards Bedburg	RB 38	Köln Messe/Deutz Terminus
Preceding station	National Express Germany	Following station
Köln-Ehrenfeld towards Aachen Hbf	RE 1 (NRW-Express)	Köln Messe/Deutz towards Hamm (Westf) Hbf
Köln Süd towards Koblenz Hbf	RE 5 (Rhein-Express)	Köln Messe/Deutz towards Wesel
Dormagen towards Minden	RE 6 (Rhein-Weser-Express)	Cologne/Bonn Airport Terminus
Dormagen towards Krefeld Hbf	RE 7 (Rhein-Münsterland-Express)	Köln Messe/Deutz towards Rheine
Köln-West towards Bonn-Mehlem	RB 48 (Rhein-Wupper-Bahn)	Köln Messe/Deutz towards Wuppertal-Oberbarmen
Preceding station	Trans Regio	Following station
Köln-West towards Mainz Hbf	RB 26	Köln Messe/Deutz Terminus
Preceding station	Rhine-Ruhr S-Bahn	Following station
Köln Hansaring towards Köln-Nippes	S6	Köln Messe/Deutz towards Essen Hbf
Preceding station	Cologne S-Bahn	Following station
Köln Hansaring towards Düsseldorf Airport Terminal	S11	Köln Messe/Deutz towards Bergisch Gladbach
Köln Hansaring towards Horrem	S12	Köln Messe/Deutz towards Au (Sieg)
Köln Hansaring towards Düren	S19	Köln Messe/Deutz towards Au (Sieg)
Preceding station	Cologne Stadtbahn	Following station
Appellhofplatz towards Sparkasse Am Butzweilerhof	Line 5	Rathaus towards Heumarkt
Appellhofplatz towards Bad Godesberg Stadthalle	Line 16	Ebertplatz towards Niehl Sebastianstraße
Appellhofplatz towards Bonn Hbf	Line 18	Ebertplatz towards Thielenbruch
Location

Köln Hauptbahnhof (English: Cologne Central Station) is the central railway station of Cologne, Germany. The station is an important local, national and international transport hub, with many ICE, Eurostar and Intercity trains calling there, as well as regional Regional-Express, RegionalBahn and local S-Bahn trains. EuroNight and Nightjet night services also call at the station. It has frequent connections to Frankfurt by way of the Cologne–Frankfurt high-speed rail line, which starts in southern Cologne. On an average day, about 320,000 travellers frequent the station, making it the fifth busiest station in Germany.

The station is situated next to Cologne Cathedral.

There is another important station in Cologne, the Köln Messe/Deutz station across the river Rhine, just about 400 metres away from Köln Hauptbahnhof. The stations are linked by the Hohenzollern Bridge, a six-track railway bridge with pedestrian and bicycle lanes on each side. Frequent local services connect the two stations.

== History ==
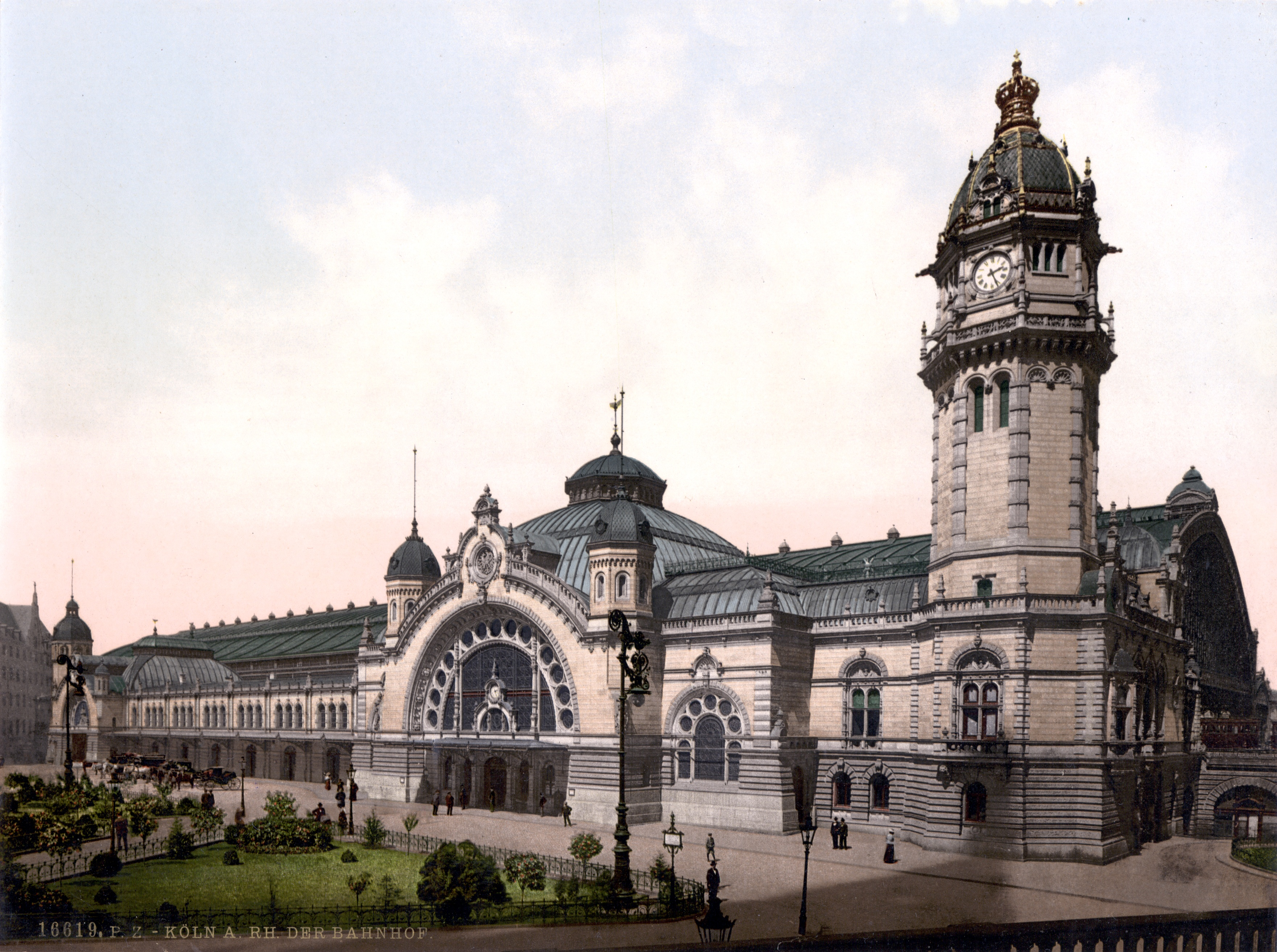
Köln Hauptbahnhof in 1900

Outside and inside Köln Hauptbahnhof, 2014

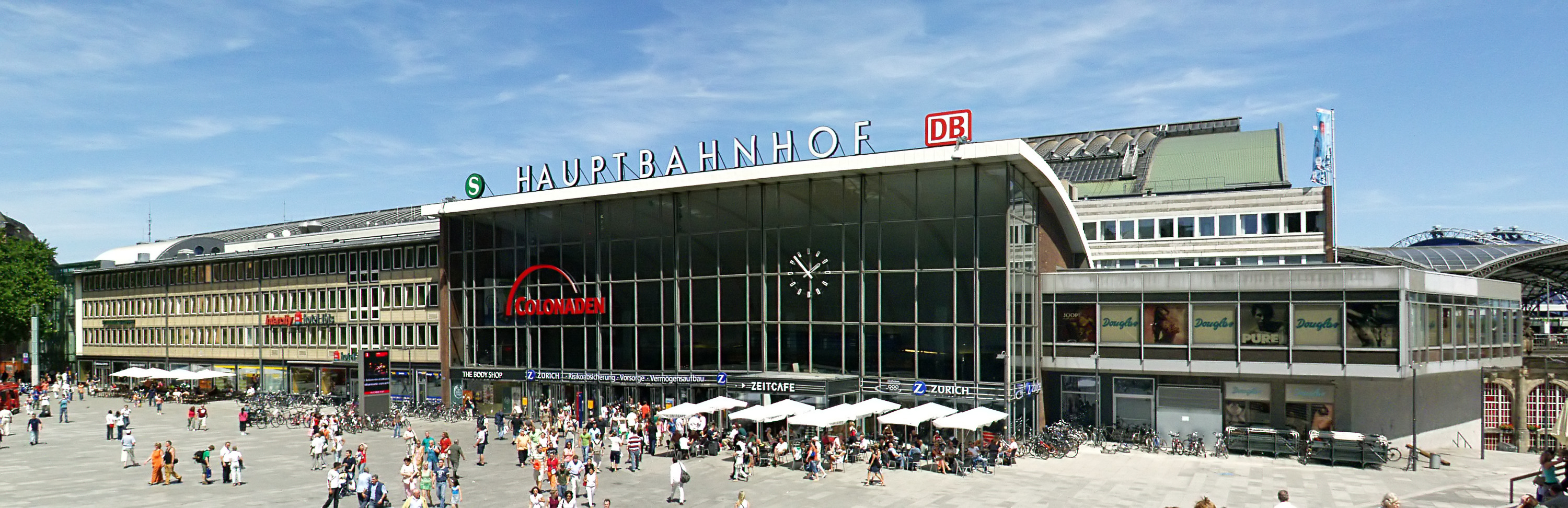
Station forecourt and entrance

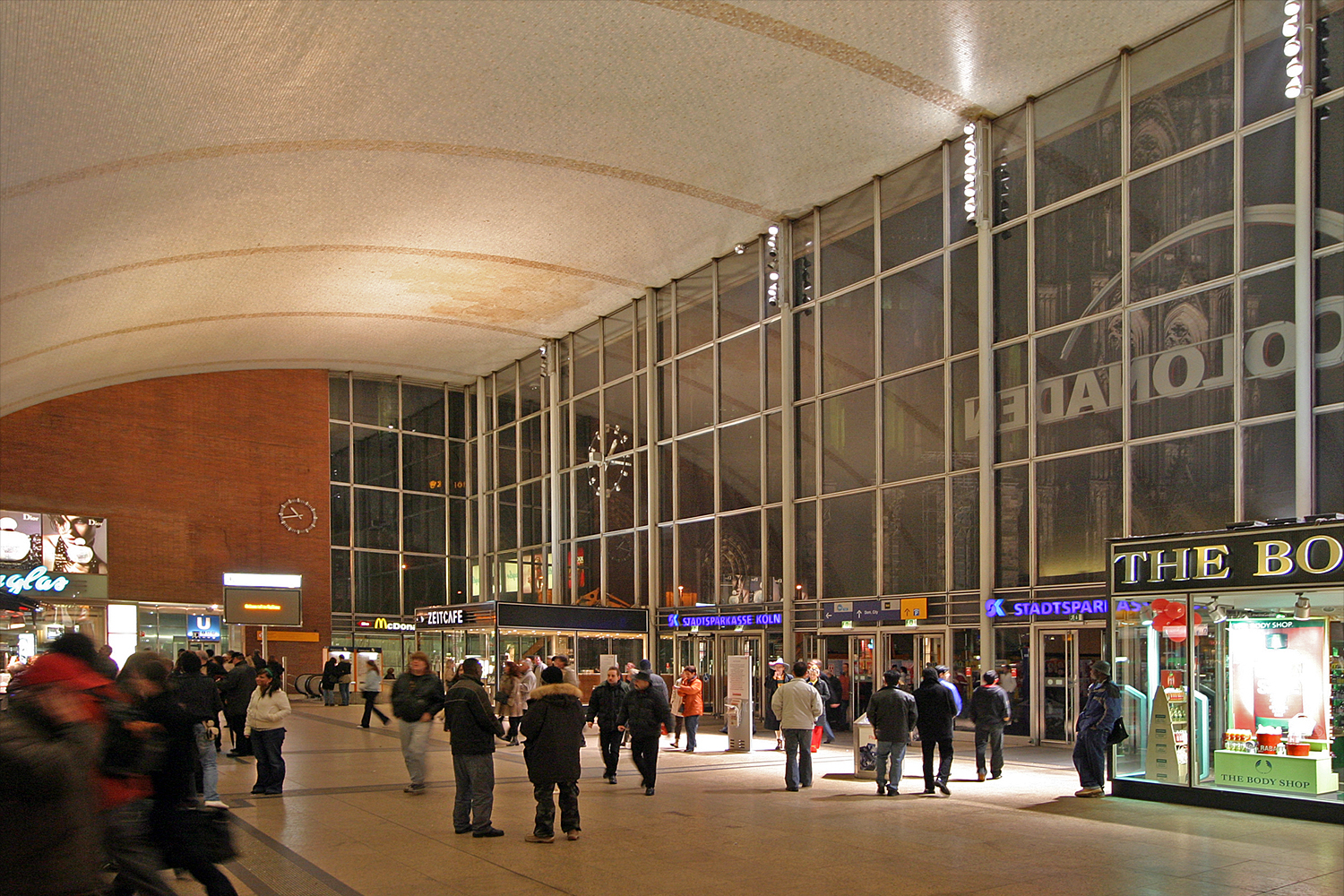
The station hall

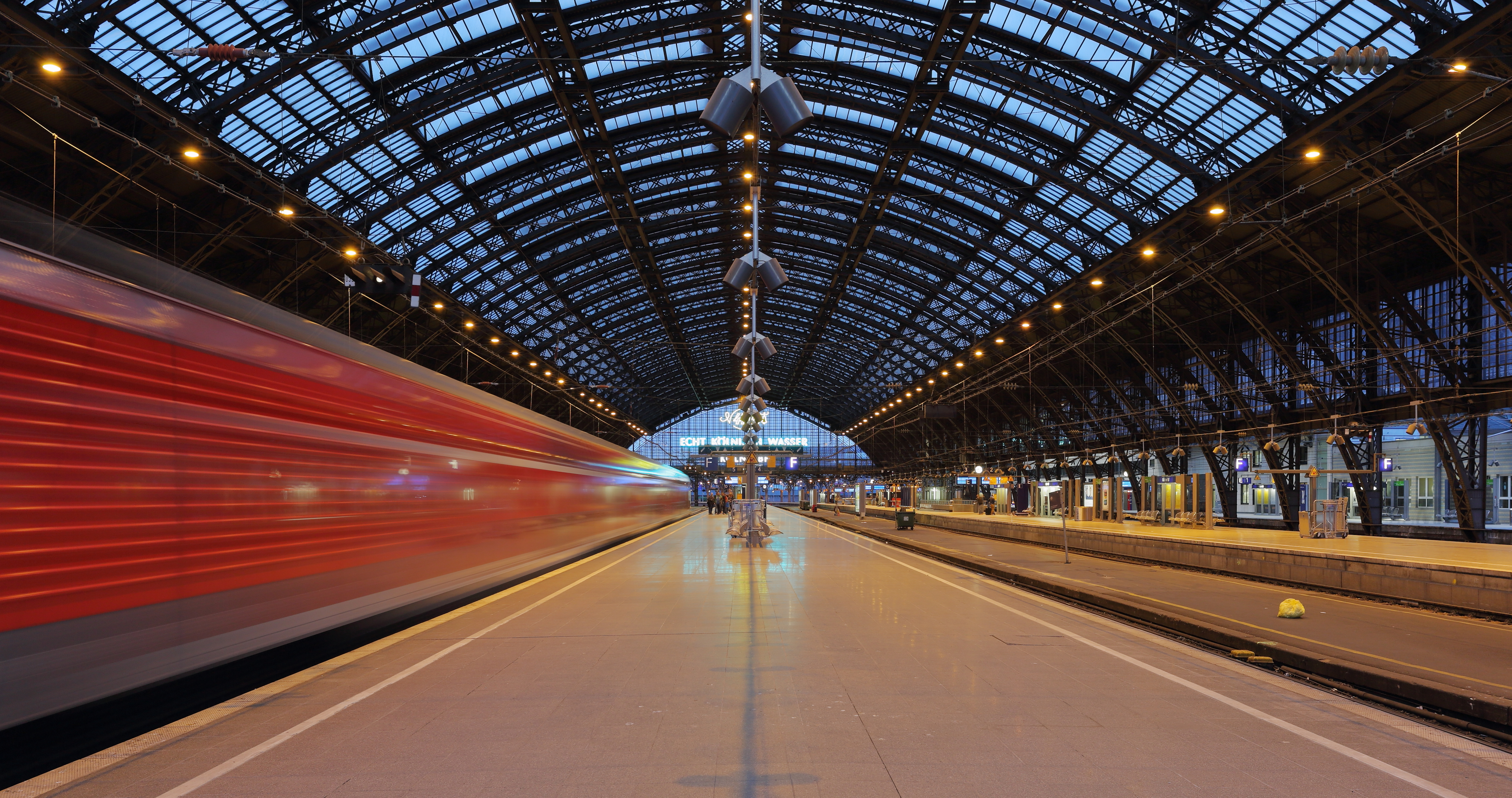
Inside the main hall at dusk

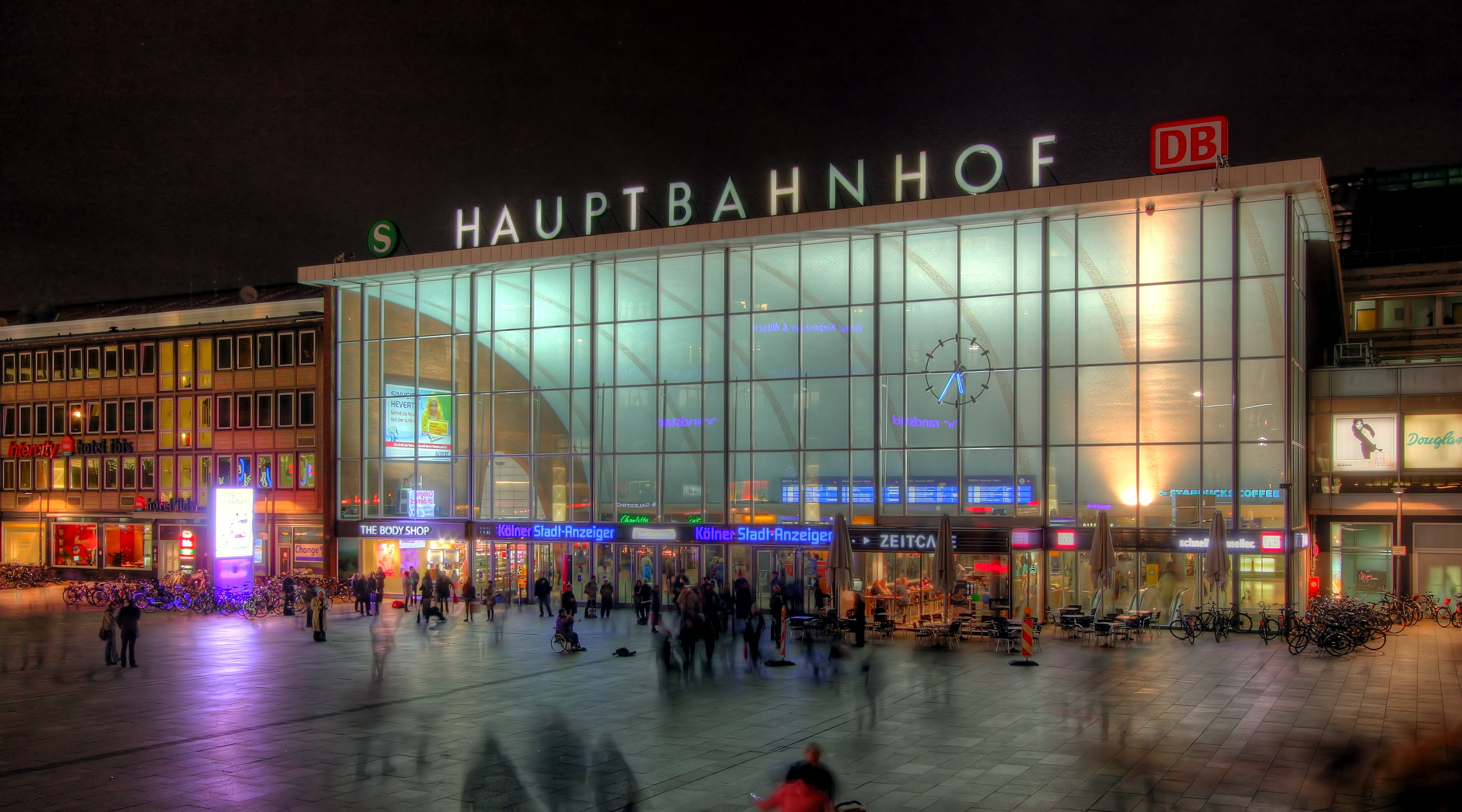
Night view from Cathedral

By 1850 there were five stations at Cologne that had been built by different railway companies. On the west bank of the Rhine there were the Bonn-Cologne Railway Company (German, old spelling: Bonn-Cölner Eisenbahn-Gesellschaft, BCE), the Cologne-Krefeld Railway Company (German, old spelling: Cöln-Crefelder Eisenbahn-Gesellschaft, CCE) and the Rhenish Railway Company (German: Rheinische Eisenbahn-Gesellschaft, RhE). On the east bank there were the Bergisch-Märkische Railway Company (German: Bergisch-Märkische Eisenbahn-Gesellschaft, BME) and the Cologne-Minden Railway Company (German, old spelling: Cöln-Mindener Eisenbahn-Gesellschaft, CME).

In 1854 a controversial decision was taken to locate a new rail and road bridge next to the cathedral, following consideration of such proposals as connecting the bridge to an existing freight yard and temporary passenger station on the banks of the Rhine (Rhine Station) at the street of Trankgasse, which is to the southeast of the current Hauptbahnhof. It was suggested that carriages could be lowered by lift to the Trankgasse station, but it was quickly realized that the only effective way for connecting the left and right bank line was to create a central station. The city agreed to the proposal in 1857 and made available the ground of the former Botanical garden to the north of the cathedral and on the site of part of the old University of Cologne, suppressed by the French in 1798. The railway track was laid at ground level from the bridge over the Rhine and crossing the street of Eigelstein west of the station at ground level and running through the medieval city wall.

=== Original station ===
The original Central Station (German: Centralbahnhof) was built beginning in 1857 to the plans of Hermann Otto Pflaume on behalf of the RhE, which had in the same year acquired the BCE. The station was opened on 5 December 1859 together with the Cathedral Bridge (German: Dombrücke, later the site of the Hohenzollernbrücke). The Central Station was a combined terminus and through station: it included four terminating tracks for the RhE running to the west, while the CME had two through tracks connected to its line on the eastern side of the Rhine by the Cathedral Bridge.

The station quickly reached capacity, but the RhE as operator had only limited interest in developing the station, as this would have mainly benefited competing companies. Serious planning for an enlarged station was therefore only taken after the nationalisation of the railways in Prussia in the 1880s.

=== New station ===
For the planning of the new central station two options were considered:

- Construction of a major railway station in an open area north of Venloer Straße and reclassifying of the original station as a minor station, or
- Replacement of the central station with a new building at the same place with an increase in platforms and the construction of two secondary passenger stations (Cologne West and Cologne South) on the urban railway on the model of Berlin Stadtbahn and a rail freight bypass.

While the Prussian government argued for the second option, opinion in Cologne was split. On 9 January 1883, the Cologne City Council decided by one vote, finally, for the second option under a plan by the engineer E. Grüttefien of Berlin. Construction began in 1889. The tracks were raised by six metres (19 ft 8 in) with half the new space created under the track filled with earth and a new entrance building was built to the design of Georg Frentzen, an architect from Aachen. The foundation stone was laid on 7 May 1892.

In 1894, the large tripartite platform hall was completed. The central hall had a roof span of 64 metres (210 ft 0 in) covering today's platforms 2 to 7, and outside it were two 13-metre (42 ft 8 in)-wide aisles for platforms 1 and 8. The 255-metre (836 ft 7 in)-long hall included a two-storey waiting room building, with easy access to all platforms. The station included four terminating platforms facing east and four facing west on either side of the waiting rooms, with one through platform on the northeast side and one on the southwest side.

During the restructuring of the rail tracks in the Cologne area in about 1905–1911 (most notable for the construction of the new South Bridge and the four-track Hohenzollern Bridge), the waiting room building was removed and all the platforms were rebuilt as through platforms. Advantage was taken of the previously unused space beneath the tracks.

Only the first and second class waiting rooms in Trankgasse and Johannisstraße (streets) survived World War II and subsequent modifications and are now used as a restaurant and the Alter Wartesaal events centre.

=== Reconstruction and new construction ===
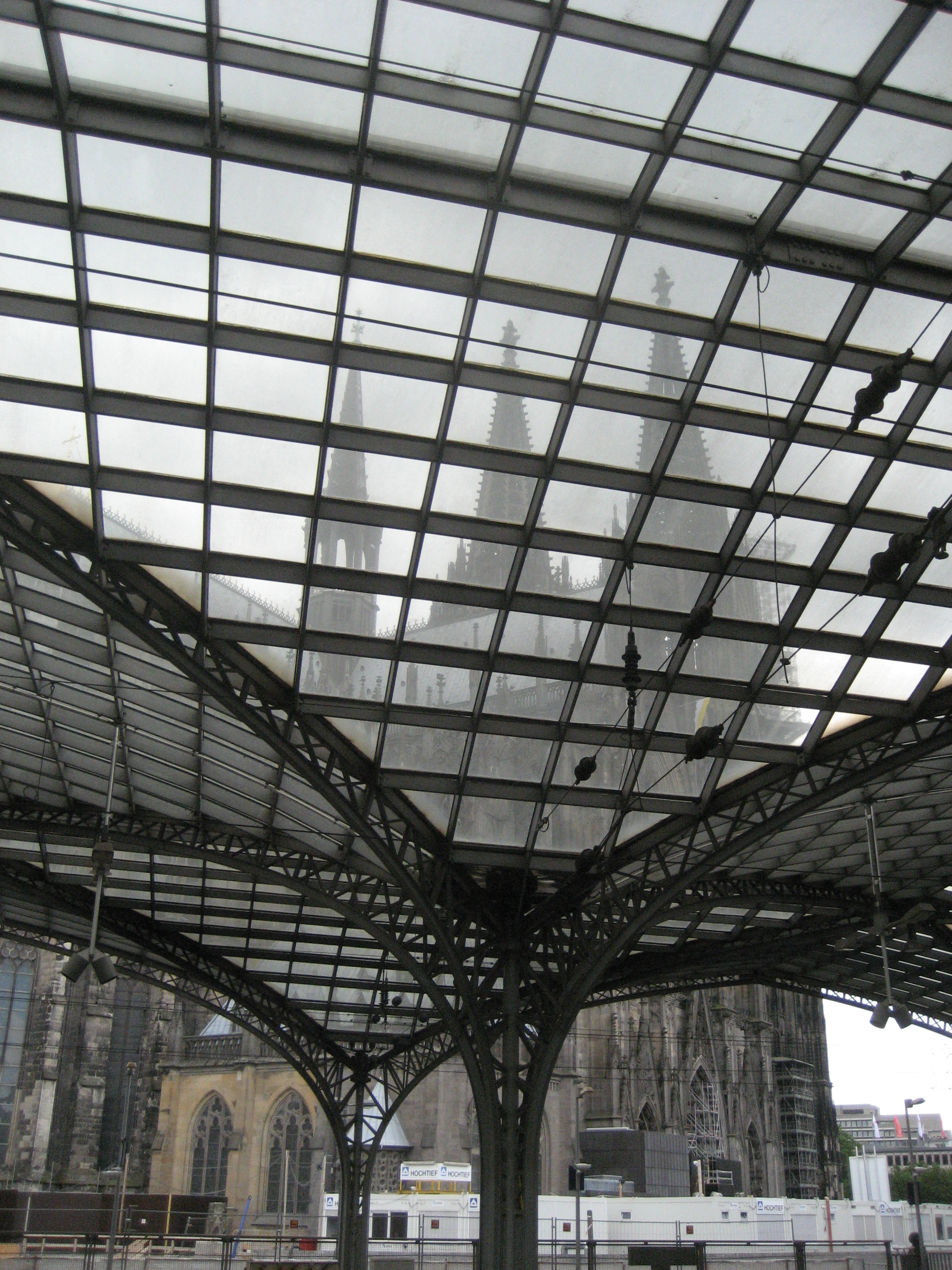
Railway roof & Dom

For several years after World War II, there was debate as to whether the main station should be rebuilt on the site of the Gereon freight yard—now the site of MediaPark. Therefore, the reconstruction of the main railway station was a slow process and for a decade Cologne station included temporary structures.

The first phase of redevelopment began in 1953 with the demolition of the long building on the western side, replaced by a modern structure incorporating baggage handling facilities and a hotel. The original station building, which had sustained only minor wartime damage and had been temporarily repaired, was demolished in 1955. On 23 September 1957, the new station hall, featuring a shell-shaped roof designed by architects Schmitt and Schneider, was inaugurated. The main station building was constructed on the northern side of the station following the clearance of built-up areas between Maximinenstraße, Domstraße, Hofergasse, and Hermannstraße, along with the relocation of Goldgasse to accommodate the creation of Breslauer Platz as a secondary entrance plaza.

In the course of building the S-Bahn up until 1991, the entire railway line, railway station and the Hohenzollern bridge were supplemented by two independent S-Bahn tracks. First, in 1975 two additional platforms were built (10 and 11) and then the additional tracks were built on the Hohenzollern bridge for the S-Bahn line.

In 2000, a shopping centre was opened at the station's entry level, extending to the area beneath the S-Bahn tracks. Known as the colonnade, it comprises 70 shops and restaurants, encompassing over 11,500 square metres (124,000 sq ft) of retail space and employing approximately 700 people.

=== Planning ===
At a summit of Deutsche Bahn, the federal government and the state of North Rhine-Westphalia on 31 March 2010 in Düsseldorf, it was decided that the station should be extended by 2019 with an S-Bahn platform with two S-Bahn tracks at Breslauer Platz. The estimated cost would amount to €60 million.

The platform for track 1 was planned to be extended to provide a secure area for checking passenger and baggage to enable ICE trains to run to London-St Pancras in 2016. This plan was not implemented, the reason given that there were issues approving ICE trains by Belgian and French authorities. In December 2025, DB and Eurostar signed a letter of intent with the goal of offering direct connections using Eurostar trains starting in the early 2030s. The necessary crossing of the western track area by trains departing towards London is considered operationally challenging.

== Rail services ==
Cologne Hauptbahnhof is one of the hubs of European long-distance traffic. Long-distance lines run on both sides of the Rhine via Cologne. Therefore, the station situated on the left (western) bank of the Rhine is connected to Köln Messe/Deutz station situated on the right (eastern) bank of the Rhine via the Hohenzollern Bridge. Long-distance trains connect in the station from the Ruhr region, southern Germany, Switzerland, the Netherlands and Belgium. Köln Messe/Deutz (tief) station is used by two ICE services on the right bank route. In the past, therefore, a direct connection, such as a moving walkway over the Rhine was considered, but this controversial idea was rejected as too expensive for the time being.

The Cologne rail node is at the centre of eleven routes radiating in all directions. More than 280,000 arriving and departing passengers are estimated to use 1,200 trains daily.

Cologne Hauptbahnhof, together with the Hohenzollern Bridge is a key bottleneck for rail transport in the Cologne region. Long-distance traffic load is concentrated to and from the east of the station, while regional trains mainly run to and from the west. The connecting lines from Hürth-Kalscheuren and Steinstraße are operating at capacity. Adding extra tracks is hardly possible. Changing the track layout is not possible with the existing signalling. The network will become increasingly congested up to 2030 and beyond.

Although its platforms are divided into three sections each, they are still remarkably crowded throughout the day, and a major extension of the station is impossible because of its historic surroundings. Connections to the local Cologne network Stadtbahn are made by two subterranean stations, Dom/Hbf and Breslauer Platz/Hbf at the respective ends of the station. The station has 11 main line passenger track platforms, of which two are used for S-Bahn services; one of the two subterranean Stadtbahn has two tracks with side platforms (Dom/Hbf) the other (Breslauer Platz/Hbf) has two out of three tracks in service and one side platform and an island platform (both in use). Its IATA code is QKL.

Left (western) bank		Rhine	Right (eastern) bank	
Lower Left Rhine line to Neuss; High-speed railway Aachen; Line to Mönchengladbach; West Rhine Railway to Bonn; Cologne freight bypass railway; Eifel Railway to Euskirchen/Trier	Hbf	Hohenzollern Bridge	Messe/Deutz	Line to Düsseldorf; Line to Bergisch Gladbach; Line to Wuppertal; Sieg Railway; Agger Valley Railway; Airport loop; High speed line to Frankfurt/Wiesbaden; East Rhine Railway to Linz (Rhein)

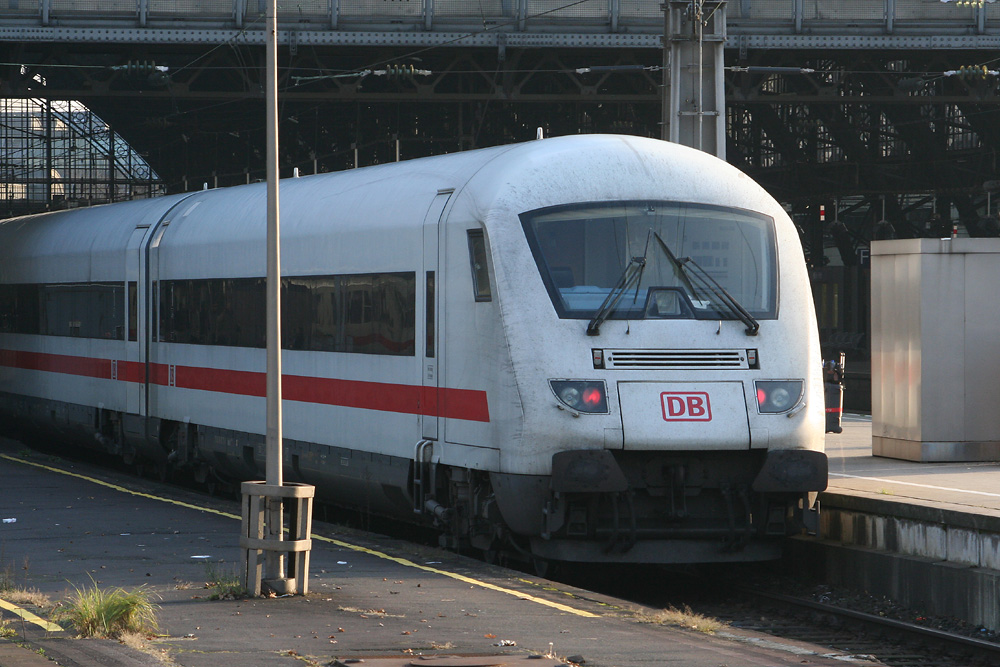
Former Metropolitan IC service in Köln Hbf

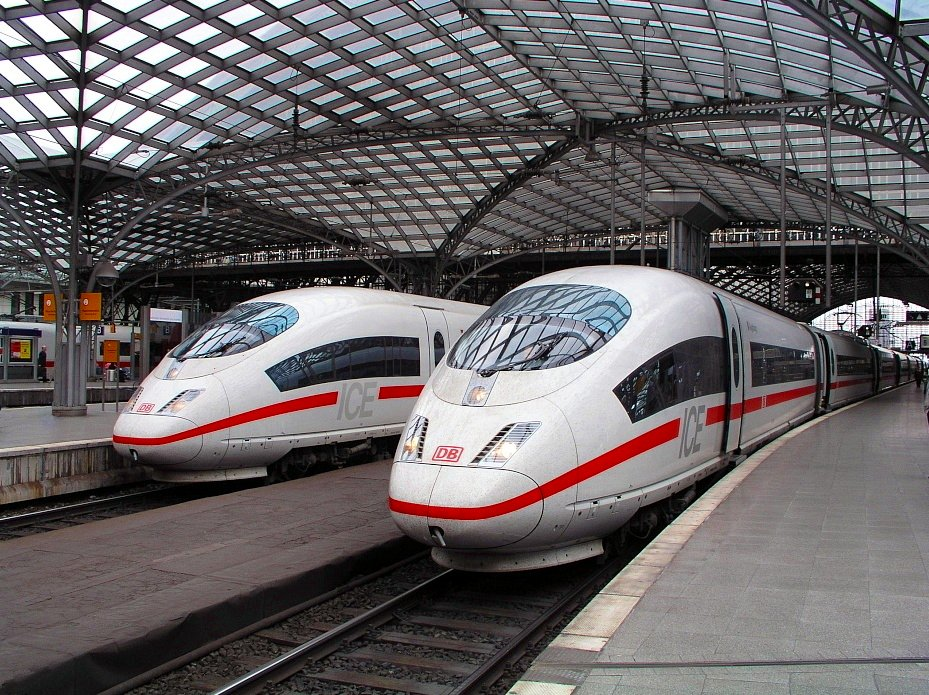
A Deutsche Bahn high-speed train

=== Long-distance services ===
Cologne Hauptbahnhof is the hub of many Intercity Express and Intercity lines, mostly serving Cologne every hour or every two hours:

Various high-speed services connect most cities in Germany as well as several neighbouring countries in a few hours. Eurostar high-speed trains run from Cologne to Paris via Aachen, Liege and Brussels. An international Intercity Express service also operates every two hours during the day on the Brussels–Liege—Aachen–Cologne line, continuing to Frankfurt.

With a combined 403 scheduled long-distance arrivals and departures each day at Cologne in the summer timetable of 1989, it was the most important node in the network of Deutsche Bundesbahn. With 383 scheduled long-distance arrivals and departures, in Deutsche Bahn's timetable of summer 1996, it was the second most important node (after Hannover Hauptbahnhof).

Normal travel time in 2011 from Cologne by Intercity-Express/Intercity to ...
Destination	Travel time (ICE)	Travel time (IC)	Remarks
Amsterdam	2:37	3:57	
Basel	3:52	4:44	
Berlin	4:20	5:59	
Brussels	1:48	3:21	
Frankfurt am Main	1:04	2:20	
Hamburg	3:59	3:59	
Hannover	2:40	3:05	
Leipzig	4:51	6:06	
Luxemburg	—	3:21	
Munich	4:20	5:58	
Paris	3:15	—	by Eurostar
Stuttgart	2:13	3:28	

In the 2026 timetable, the following long-distance services stop at the station:

Line	Route		Frequency	Operator
ICE 1	Hamburg-Altona – Hamburg – Essen – Duisburg – Düsseldorf – Cologne – Bonn – Koblenz – Mainz – Frankfurt Airport – Frankfurt – Würzburg – Nuremberg – Regensburg – Passau		Three times a day	DB Fernverkehr
ICE 9	Bonn – Cologne – Berlin-Spandau – Berlin –	Berlin Ostbahnhof	Every six hours	DB Fernverkehr
ICE 9	Bonn – Cologne – Berlin-Spandau – Berlin –	Berlin Südkreuz	Every six hours	DB Fernverkehr
ICE 10	Berlin East – Berlin – Hanover – Bielefeld – Hamm –	Dortmund – Bochum – Essen – Duisburg – Düsseldorf Airport – Düsseldorf (– Cologne)	Hourly	DB Fernverkehr
ICE 10	Berlin East – Berlin – Hanover – Bielefeld – Hamm –	Hagen – Wuppertal – Cologne	Every 2 hours	DB Fernverkehr
ICE 19	Berlin East – Berlin – Hanover – Hamm – Hagen – Wuppertal – Cologne (– Bonn – Koblenz)		Every 2 hours	DB Fernverkehr
ICE 33	Westerland – Niebüll – Itzehoe – Hamburg – Bremen – Osnabrück – Münster – Gelsenkirchen – Essen – Duisburg – Düsseldorf – Cologne		1 train pair	DB Fernverkehr
IC 35	Norddeich Mole – Emden – Münster – Recklinghausen – Wanne-Eickel – Gelsenkirchen – Oberhausen – Duisburg – Düsseldorf – Cologne		Every 2 hours	DB Fernverkehr
IC 37	Düsseldorf – Cologne – Bonn – Remagen – Andernach – Koblenz – Kobern-Gondorf – Treis-Karden – Cochem – Bullay – Wittlich – Schweich – Trier – Wasserbillig – Luxembourg		1 train pair	CFL/DB Fernverkehr
ICE 42	Hamburg – Bremen – Münster – Dortmund – Hagen – Wuppertal – Solingen – Cologne – Siegburg/Bonn – Frankfurt Airport – Mannheim – Stuttgart – Munich		Every 2 hours	DB Fernverkehr
ICE 43	Hamburg-Altona – Hamburg – Bremen – Münster – Dortmund – Essen – Düsseldorf – Cologne – Siegburg/Bonn – Frankfurt Airport – Mannheim – Karlsruhe – Basel		Some trains	DB Fernverkehr
ICE 45	Cologne – Cologne/Bonn Airport – Montabaur – Limburg Süd – Wiesbaden – Mainz – Heidelberg – Stuttgart		Some trains	DB Fernverkehr
ICE 49	Cologne (– Cologne/Bonn Airport) – Siegburg/Bonn – Montabaur – Limburg Süd – Frankfurt Airport – Frankfurt		Some trains	DB Fernverkehr
ICE 55; IC 55	Dresden – Leipzig – Halle – Magdeburg – Hannover – Hamm – Dortmund – Wuppertal – Cologne – Bonn – Koblenz – Mainz – Mannheim – Heidelberg – Vaihingen (Enz) – Stuttgart (– Reutlingen – Tübingen)		Every 2 hours	DB Fernverkehr
ICE 55; IC 55	Dortmund – Essen – Düsseldorf – Cologne – Bonn – Koblenz – Mainz – Mannheim – Heidelberg – Stuttgart – Ulm – Oberstdorf		1 train pair	DB Fernverkehr
ICE 78	Amsterdam – Arnhem – Oberhausen – Duisburg – Düsseldorf – Cologne – Frankfurt Airport – Frankfurt		Every 2 hours	DB Fernverkehr
ICE 79	Brussels – Aachen – Cologne – Frankfurt Airport – Frankfurt		Every 2 hours	DB Fernverkehr
ICE 91	Hamburg-Altona – Hamburg – Bremen – Osnabrück – Münster – Dortmund – Hagen – Wuppertal – Solingen – Cologne – Bonn – Koblenz – Mainz – Frankfurt Airport – Frankfurt – / Hanau – Würzburg – Nuremberg – Ingolstadt – Munich		Every 2 hours	DB Fernverkehr
Eurostar	Dortmund – Essen – Duisburg – Düsseldorf Airport – Düsseldorf – Cologne – Aachen – Liège-Guillemins – Brussels-South – Paris-Nord			Eurostar
FLX 20	Hamburg – Osnabrück – Münster – Gelsenkirchen – Essen – Duisburg – Düsseldorf – Cologne		1-3 train pairs	Bahntouristikexpress
FLX 30	Leipzig – Lutherstadt Wittenberg – Berlin Südkreuz – Berlin – Berlin-Spandau – Hannover – Bielefeld – Dortmund – Essen – Duisburg – Düsseldorf – Cologne – Aachen		1-2 train pairs	Bahntouristikexpress
NJ Amsterdam-Zürich	Amsterdam – Utrecht – Arnhem – Düsseldorf – Cologne – Freiburg – Basel – Zürich		1 train pair	ÖBB Nightjet
NJ 425	Brussels-South – Brussels-North – Liège-Guillemins – Aachen – Cologne – Bonn-Beuel – Koblenz – Mainz – Frankfurt Airport – Frankfurt South – Nuremberg –	Augsburg – Munich – Kufstein – Wörgl – Jenbach – Innsbruck		ÖBB Nightjet
NJ 50425	Brussels-South – Brussels-North – Liège-Guillemins – Aachen – Cologne – Bonn-Beuel – Koblenz – Mainz – Frankfurt Airport – Frankfurt South – Nuremberg –	Regensburg – Passau – Wels – Linz – Amstetten – St. Pölten – Wien Meidling – Vienna		ÖBB Nightjet

=== Regional services ===
Cologne Hauptbahnhof is also a hub for numerous Regional-Express and Regionalbahn services, mostly serving the station in Cologne every half-hour or hour, but sometime only every two hours. In the 2026 timetable, the following regional services stop at the station:

Line	Line name	Frequency	Route
RE 1	NRW-Express	Hourly	Paderborn –) Hamm – Dortmund – Essen – Duisburg – Düsseldorf – Cologne – Düren – Aachen
RE 5	Rhein-Express	Hourly	Emmerich – Wesel – Duisburg – Düsseldorf – Cologne – Bonn – Remagen – Andernach – Koblenz
RE 6	Rhein-Weser-Express	Hourly	Minden – Herford – Bielefeld – Hamm – Dortmund – Essen – Duisburg – Düsseldorf Airport – Düsseldorf Hbf – Neuss – Cologne Hbf – Cologne/Bonn Airport
RE 7	Rhein-Münsterland-Express	Hourly	Rheine – Münster – Hamm – Hagen – Wuppertal – Solingen – Cologne – Neuss – Krefeld
RE 8	Rhein-Erft-Express	Hourly	(Kaldenkirchen) – Mönchengladbach – Grevenbroich – Rommerskirchen – Cologne – Porz (Rhein) – Troisdorf – Bonn-Beuel – Linz am Rhein – Koblenz Stadtmitte – Koblenz
RE 9	Rhein-Sieg-Express	Hourly	Aachen – Düren – Cologne – Troisdorf – Siegburg/Bonn – Au (Sieg) – Siegen
RE 12	Eifel-Mosel-Express	Some train pairs	Köln Messe/Deutz – Cologne – Euskirchen – Gerolstein – Trier
RE 22/ RB 22	Eifel-Express	Hourly	Köln Messe/Deutz – Cologne – Euskirchen – Gerolstein
RB 24	Eifel-Bahn	Hourly (Cologne–Kall); some trains (Kall–Gerolstein)	Köln Messe/Deutz – Cologne – Euskirchen – Kall – Gerolstein
RB 25	Oberbergische Bahn	30 mins (Cologne–Gummersbach); hourly (Gummersbach–Lüdenscheid)	Köln Hansaring – Cologne – Overath – Gummersbach – Marienheide - Meinerzhagen (Diesel-S-Bahn)
RB 26	MittelrheinBahn	Hourly	Köln Messe/Deutz – Cologne – Bonn – Koblenz – Koblenz – Bingen – Mainz
RB 27	Rhein-Erft-Bahn	Hourly	Mönchengladbach – Grevenbroich – Rommerskirchen – Cologne – Cologne/Bonn Airport – Troisdorf – Bonn-Beuel – Linz am Rhein – Neuwied – Engers – Koblenz-Ehrenbreitstein – Koblenz
RB 38	Erft-Bahn	Hourly; 30 min (Bedburg–Horrem on weekdays)	Düsseldorf – Neuss – Grevenbroich – Bedburg – Bergheim – Cologne – Köln Messe/Deutz
RB 48	Rhein-Wupper-Bahn	30 min (W-Oberbarmen–Cologne); 30 (peak)/60 min (Cologne–Bonn); Hourly (Bonn–Bonn-Mehlem)	Wuppertal-Oberbarmen – Solingen – Cologne – Bonn – Bonn-Mehlem

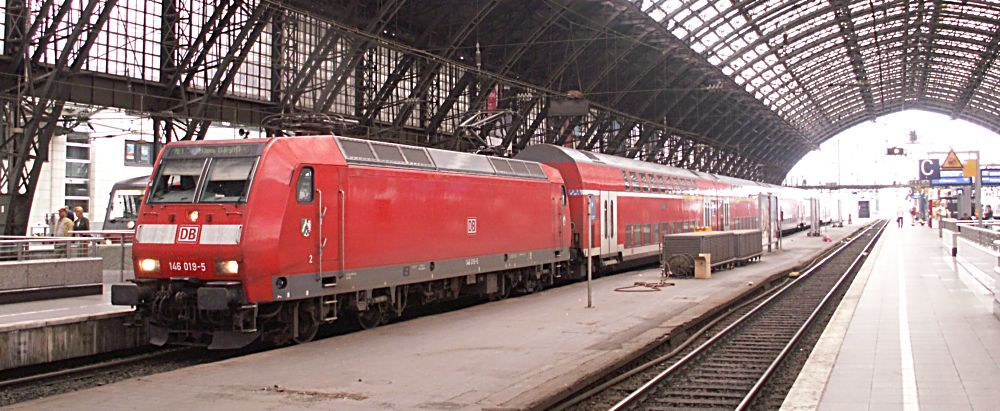
Rhein-Express in the station

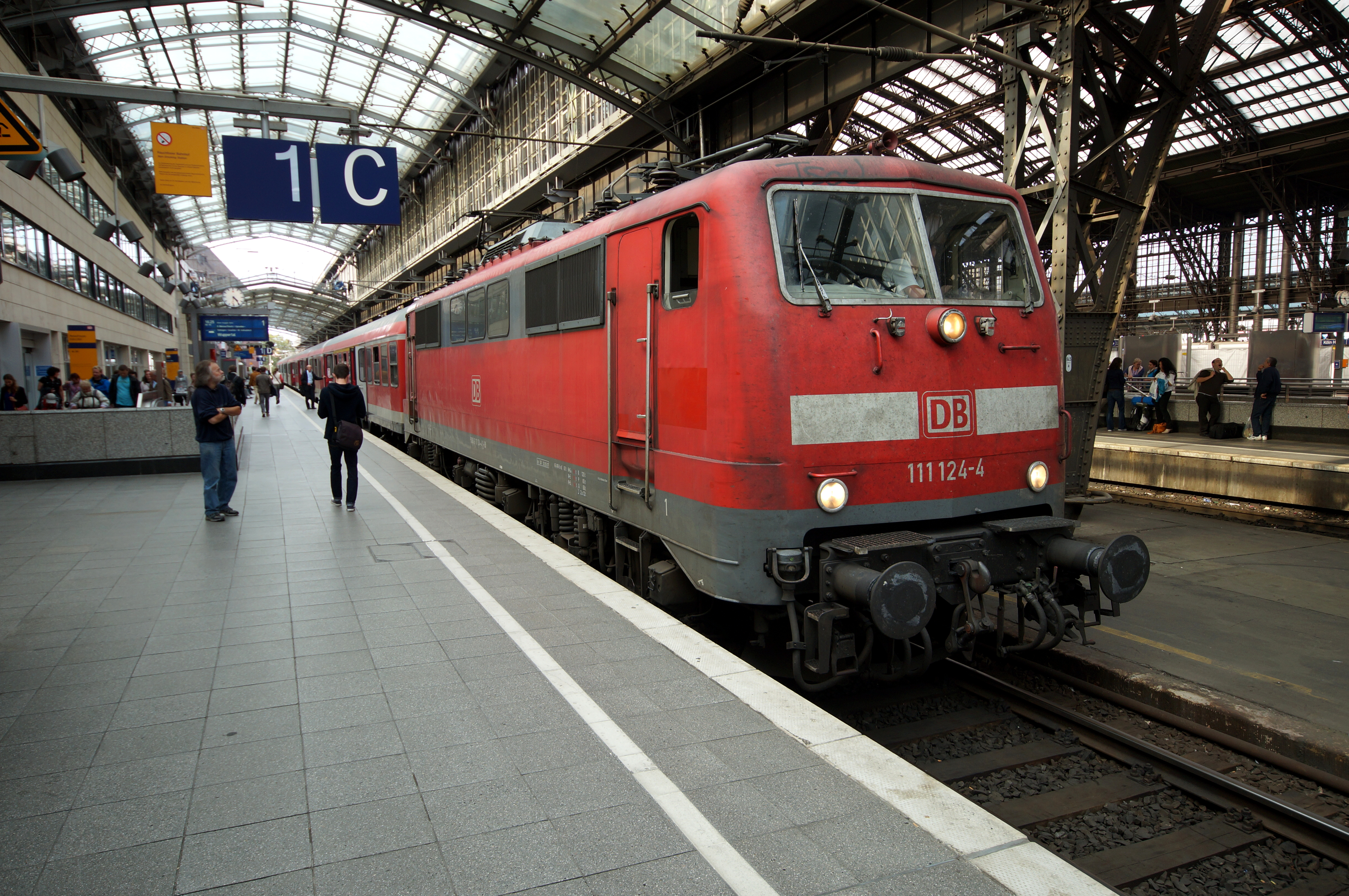
The Rhein-Wupper-Bahn hauled by a DB Class 111 on its way to Wuppertal

Line plan of the Cologne S-Bahn network

=== S-Bahn trains ===
Köln Hauptbahnhof is integrated in the Cologne S-Bahn network. From Monday to Friday S-Bahn trains run at 20-minute intervals during the day and at other times usually every 30 minutes. Northwest of the Cologne Hauptbahnhof S-Bahn station is the Köln Hansaring S-Bahn station and to the east is the Köln Messe/Deutz S-Bahn station. All S-Bahn services serving the station, use these two stations. In the 2026 timetable, the following S-Bahn services stop at the station:

Line	Network	Route
S6	Rhine-Ruhr S-Bahn	Köln-Nippes – Köln Hbf – Langenfeld – Düsseldorf Hbf – Ratingen Ost – Essen Hbf
S11	Cologne S-Bahn	Düsseldorf Flughafen Terminal – Düsseldorf – Neuss – Dormagen – Köln Hbf – Bergisch Gladbach
S12	Cologne S-Bahn	(Horrem –) Köln-Ehrenfeld – Köln Hbf – Troisdorf – Siegburg/Bonn – Hennef (– Au)
S19	Cologne S-Bahn	Düren – Horrem – Köln Hbf – Cologne/Bonn Airport – Troisdorf – Siegburg/Bonn – Hennef – Au

=== Local services ===
Below Cologne Hauptbahnhof there are two stations of the Cologne Stadtbahn. Stadtbahn stations Dom/Hauptbahnhof station and Breslauer Platz/Hauptbahnhof station are on the same tunnel that runs under the main station making a turn of 120 degrees. The former one is located below the southern end, next to the cathedral, the latter at the northern end where it connects to the bus station. Breslauer Platz/Hauptbahnhof station was relocated and completely redesigned up December 2011. Line 5 has been rerouted from Dom/Hauptbahnhof to Rathaus station to connect with the first open part of the north-south Stadtbahn tunnel, which is currently under construction. One year later line 5 was lengthened one station from Rathaus to Heumarkt. Formerly, all trains stopped at Dom/Hbf and Breslauer Platz/Hbf, but, as the junction for the new line will be between these stations, line 5 trains only stop at Dom/Hbf, and line 16 trains will only stop at Breslauer Platz/Hbf when the line is opened.

Currently Dom/Hbf station is served by the following lines (during the day at ten-minute intervals, line 18 at five-minute intervals), but Breslauer Platz/Hbf station is served only by lines 16 and 18:

Services are offered by the Cologne Stadtbahn and the Bonn Stadtbahn, often referred to as Stadtbahn Rhein-Sieg after the Verkehrsverbund Rhein-Sieg (VRS - Rhein-Sieg Transit Authority).

Line	Route
5 (KVB line)	Heumarkt – Rathaus – Dom/Hauptbahnhof – Friesenplatz – Neuehrenfeld – Sparkasse Am Butzweilerhof
16 (KVB line)	Niehl – Reichenspergerplatz – Dom/Hauptbahnhof – Neumarkt – Ubierring – Rodenkirchen – Wesseling – Bonn Hbf – Bonn-Bad Godesberg
18 (KVB line)	Thielenbruch – Buchheim – Mülheim – Reichenspergerplatz – Dom/Hauptbahnhof – Neumarkt – Klettenberg – Hürth – Brühl – Bonn Hbf

== Future ==
=== London services ===
Since January 2010, a system of "open access" on European high-speed railway lines now permits different rail operators to apply to run high-speed passenger services. DB Fernverkehr have announced their intention to operate a direct ICE service from Cologne to London St Pancras via Brussels and the Channel Tunnel. The proposal, first put forward in 2007, was delayed by Eurotunnel safety regulations which required operators to use trainsets which could be divided in the Tunnel in the event of an emergency, allowing passengers to be transported out of the tunnel in one half if the other half had a fire or breakdown. This regulation has now been relaxed, and it was envisaged that DB could begin direct London-Cologne services before the end of 2014. These plans have since been delayed for several years. In 2026 plans were announced that Eurostar would start such services a few year later. It is necessary to have a fenced track so that all passengers need to go through passport control before boarding, and this is planned, although problematic.

== See also ==
- Köln Messe/Deutz railway station
- Hauptbahnhof
- List of railway stations in North Rhine-Westphalia
- Odonia
- Rail transport in Germany
