= Appellhofplatz station =

Metro station in Cologne, Germany

Appellhofplatz
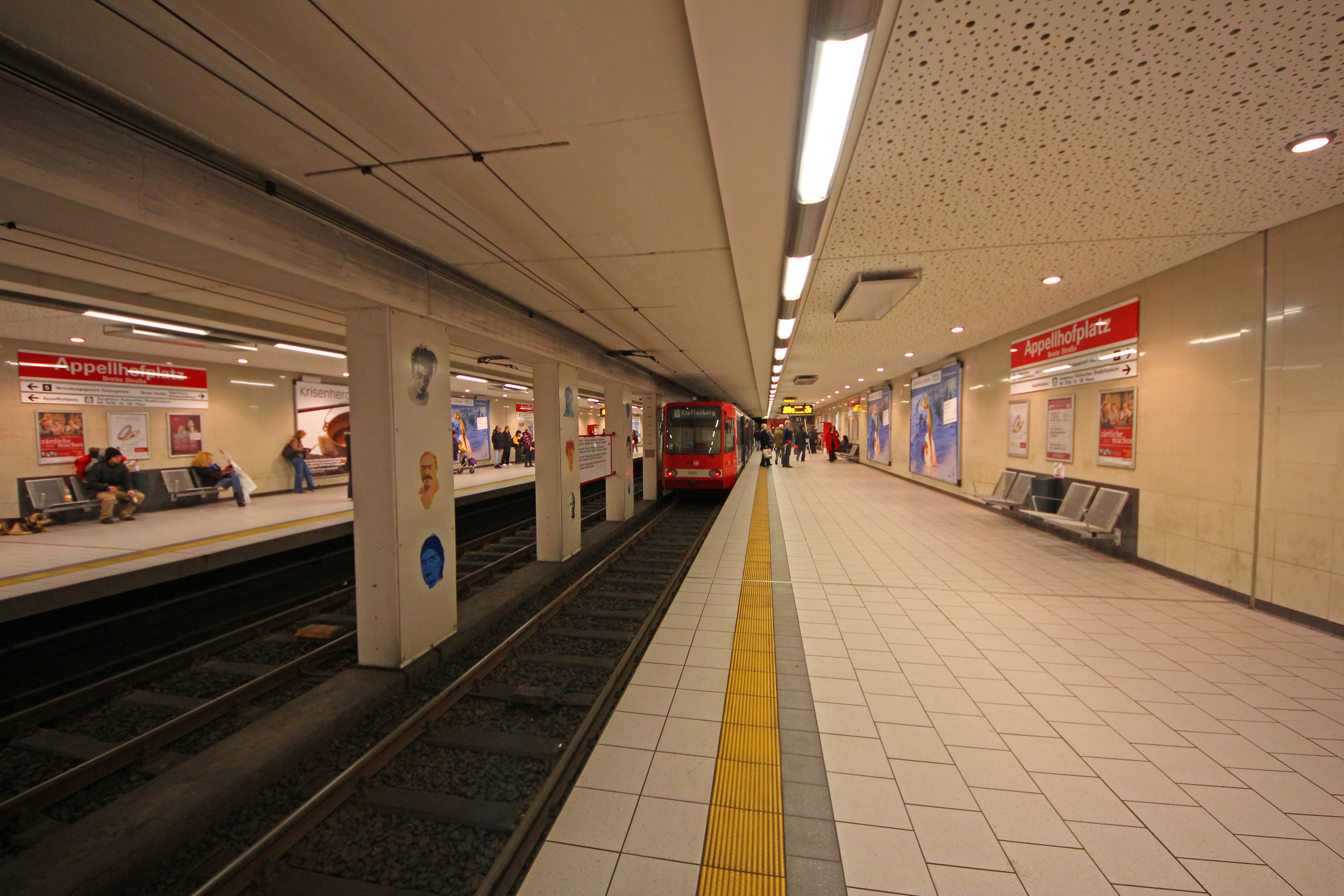
- Appellhofplatz/Breite Straße station platform in 2011

General information
- Location: Appellhofplatz; Cologne
- Coordinates: 50°56′21″N 06°57′03″E
- Owner: Kölner Verkehrs-Betriebe (KVB)
- Line: Innenstadt Stadtbahn tunnel
- Platforms: 4 side platforms
- Tracks: 4

Construction
- Structure type: Underground
- Cycle facilities: Call a Bike
- Accessible: Line 5: No; All other lines: Yes

Other information
- Fare zone: VRS: 2100

History
- Opened: 1968

Services
Preceding station	Cologne Stadtbahn	Following station
Appellhofplatz/Zeughaus
Friesenplatz towards Sparkasse Am Butzweilerhof	Line 5	Dom/Hauptbahnhof towards Heumarkt
Appellhofplatz/Breite Straße
Friesenplatz towards Görlinger-Zentrum	Line 3	Neumarkt towards Thielenbruch
Friesenplatz towards Bocklemünd	Line 4	Neumarkt towards Schlebusch
Neumarkt towards Bad Godesberg Stadthalle	Line 16	Dom/Hauptbahnhof towards Niehl Sebastianstraße
Neumarkt towards Bonn Hbf	Line 18	Dom/Hauptbahnhof towards Thielenbruch
Route map
Location

Appellhofplatz station is an underground station and hub on the Cologne Stadtbahn lines 3, 4, 5, 16 and 18 in Cologne. The station complex consists of two stations about 100 metres (330 ft) apart: Appellhofplatz/Zeughaus station used by line 5 and Appellhofplatz/Breite Straße station used by all other lines. The station is named after Appellhofplatz (English: Appeals court square) and lies in the Innenstadt district of Cologne.

== History and Layout ==
The station was opened in 1968 and 1969 and consists of a mezzanine and two platform levels with four side platforms and four rail tracks. Between the two parts of the station there is a triangular intersection, connecting the tunnels to Neumarkt, Friesenplatz and Dom/Hbf. Only the crossing in the tunnel to Friesenplatz is grade-separated, while the two others are at-grade – conversely, the crossing to Friesenplatz is the least frequented with just 36 trains per hour, while the other two serve 60 and 48 trains per hour. This design decision was taken, because the line to Friesenplatz replaced an existing highly frequented surface line, while the demand on the completely new line to Neumarkt was not expected to be as high. With the construction of the North-South Stadtbahn, line 16 will be rerouted to its own tunnel, resulting in only 36 and 48 trains using the crossings to Dom/Hbf and Neumarkt respectively, which will lead to fewer delays on this congested part of the network.

== Notable places nearby ==
- Zeughaus and Kölnisches Stadtmuseum
- St. Maria in der Kupfergasse
- EL-DE Haus
- Breite Straße, shopping district
- 4711 House
- Cologne Opera

== See also ==
- List of Cologne KVB stations
