= Dom/Hauptbahnhof station =

Metro Station in Cologne, Germany

Dom/Hauptbahnhof
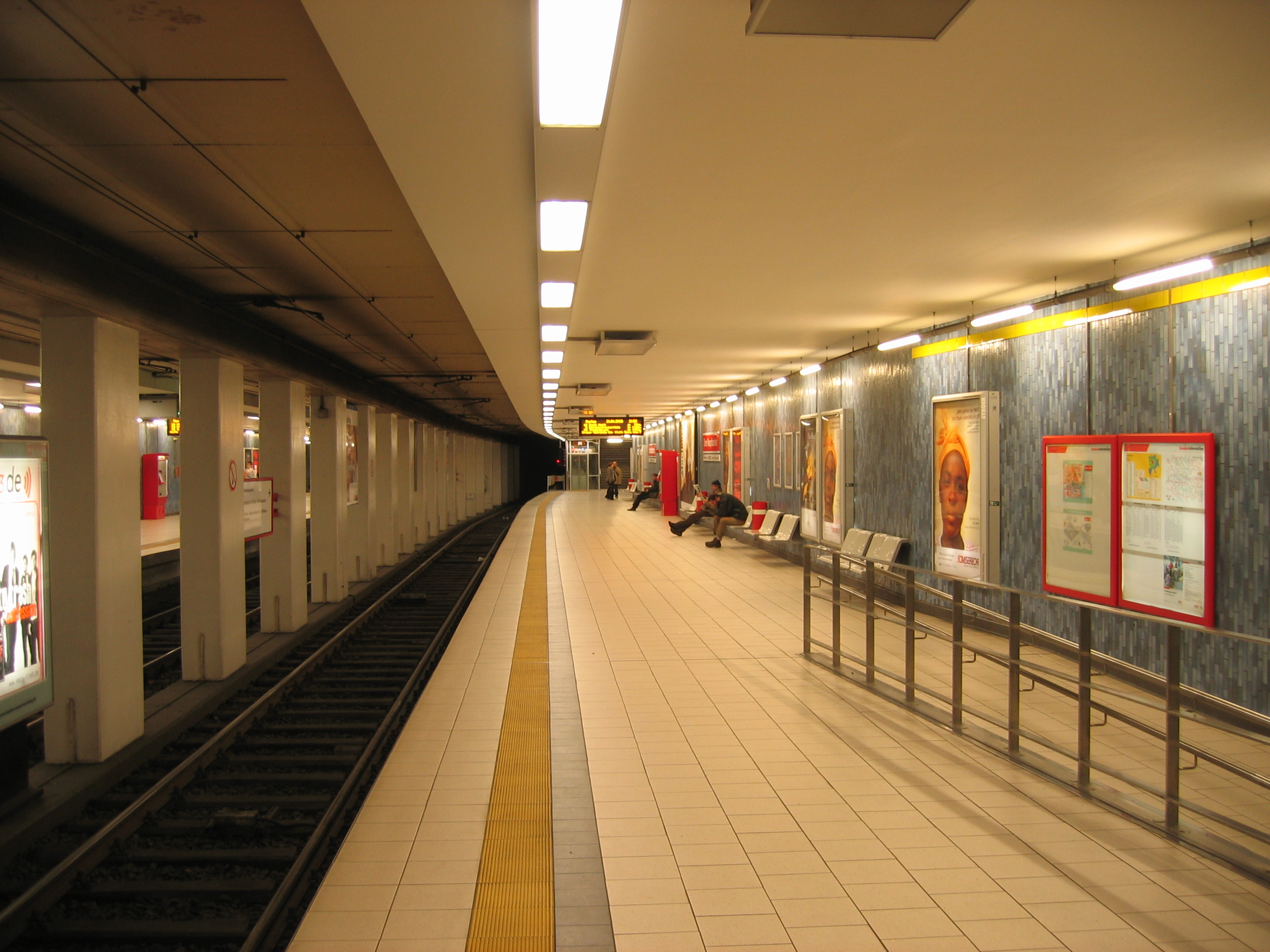
- Dom/Hauptbahnhof station in 2008

General information
- Location: Bahnhofsvorplatz; Cologne
- Coordinates: 50°56′32″N 6°57′29″E
- Owner: Kölner Verkehrs-Betriebe (KVB)
- Line: Innenstadt Stadtbahn tunnel
- Platforms: 2 side platforms
- Tracks: 2
- Connections: at Köln Hauptbahnhof; KVB: 172, 173

Construction
- Structure type: Underground
- Accessible: Yes

Other information
- Fare zone: VRS: 2100

History
- Opened: 1968
- Rebuilt: 2005

Services
Preceding station	Cologne Stadtbahn	Following station
Appellhofplatz towards Sparkasse Am Butzweilerhof	Line 5	Rathaus towards Heumarkt
Appellhofplatz towards Bad Godesberg Stadthalle	Line 16	Breslauer Platz/Hauptbahnhof towards Niehl Sebastianstraße
Appellhofplatz towards Bonn Hbf	Line 18	Breslauer Platz/Hauptbahnhof towards Thielenbruch
Location

Dom/Hauptbahnhof station (English: Cathedral/Main Station, sometimes abbreviated as Dom/Hbf) is an underground station on lines 5, 16 and 18 of the Cologne Stadtbahn system. The station is located under the southwest corner of the Köln Hauptbahnhof, the city's main railway station and along the northern edge of the Cologne Cathedral (German: Kölner Dom).

The station opened in 1968 as part of the first phase of the Innenstadt (English: inner city) Stadtbahn tunnel, and was one of the first underground stations in Cologne.

== See also ==
- List of Cologne KVB stations
