= Neumarkt station =

Railway station in Cologne, Germany

Neumarkt
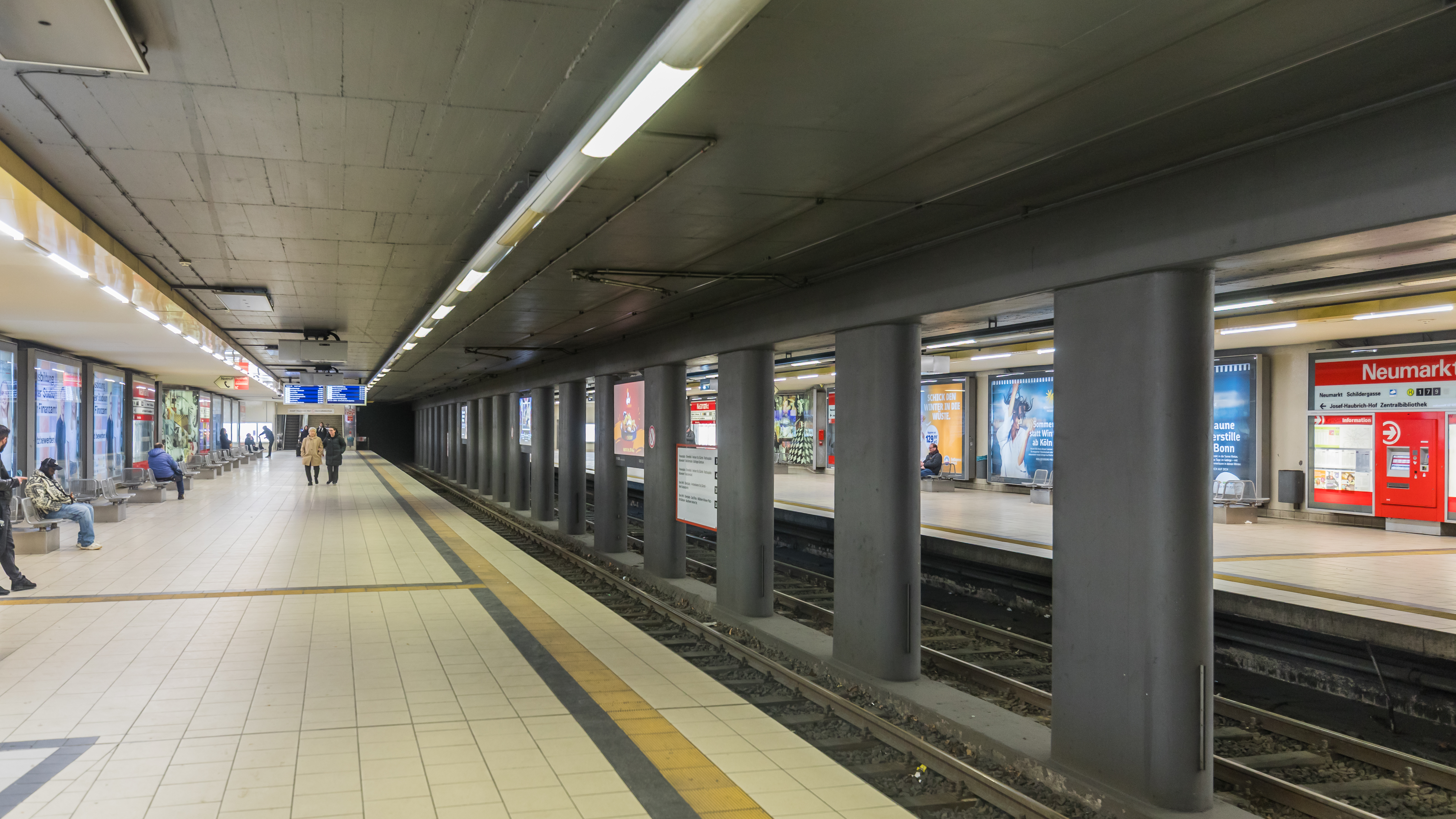
- Northbound platform of the underground station

General information
- Location: Neumarkt, 50667 Köln
- Coordinates: 50°56′09″N 6°56′55″E
- Owner: Kölner Verkehrs-Betriebe
- Line: Innenstadt tunnel
- Platforms: 6 side platforms
- Connections: KVB: 136, 146

Construction
- Structure type: Underground; At-grade
- Cycle facilities: Call a Bike
- Accessible: Yes

Other information
- Fare zone: VRS: 2100

History
- Opened: 6 October 1969

Services
Preceding station	Cologne Stadtbahn	Following station
At-grade platforms
Rudolfplatz towards Köln-Weiden West	Line 1	Heumarkt towards Bensberg
Rudolfplatz towards Frechen-Benzelrath	Line 7	Heumarkt towards Zündorf
Mauritiuskirche towards Sülz Hermeskeiler Platz	Line 9	Heumarkt towards Königsforst
Underground platforms
Appellhofplatz towards Görlinger-Zentrum	Line 3	Poststraße towards Thielenbruch
Appellhofplatz towards Bocklemünd	Line 4	Poststraße towards Schlebusch
Appellhofplatz towards Niehl Sebastianstraße	Line 16	Poststraße towards Bad Godesberg Stadthalle
Appellhofplatz towards Thielenbruch	Line 18	Poststraße towards Bonn Hbf
Route map
Location

Neumarkt station is a Stadtbahn station in Innenstadt, Cologne. The station is divided in an overground part for low-floor trains and an underground part for high-floor trains. It is important as a junction between the low-floor east-western lines (1, 7, 9) and the high-floor lines (3, 4, 16, 18). The station is located at Neumarkt (English: New Market) square.

== Overground station ==
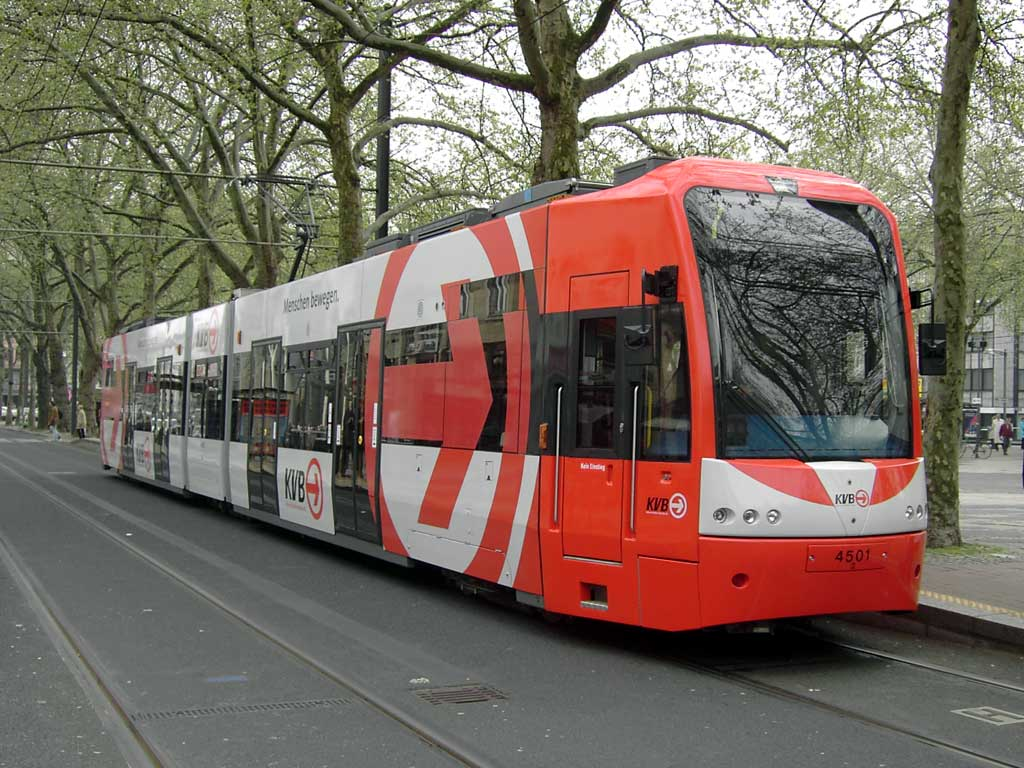
Neumarkt station (overground)

The overground part consists mainly of two low-floor platforms on the Neumarkt square used by the East-western trains of lines 1, 7, and 9. Although most of the trains don't terminate here in regular service, there is a loop surrounding the place. This loop, used for example by additional trains to the Stadium and by line 7 in the late evenings uses two additional platforms at the northern end of the Neumarkt. From the main platforms, there are stairs leading to the underground part of the station and to the HUGO-Passage.

As part of improvements to the East-West axis, which in peak hours operates the maximum of 30 trains per hour per direction, the platforms will be lengthened to 90m to accommodate new longer trains. Building a new tunnel for lines 1, 7 and 9 is also considered, but it would only minimally improve service, and would be difficult to build due to the existing tunnels, which were not made for a second set of tunnels below them.

Adjacent to the station is also a bus stop. All bus lines terminate here, the stop for exit is near the main platforms, the entrance platform near the platforms in the loop.

== Underground station ==
The underground station is used by the high-floor trains of lines 3, 4, 16, and 18. There are two side-platforms, but the station does not offer any operational infrastructure.

When this station was opened, it also used low-floor platforms as also trams called here. When the platforms were elevated to allow step-free access to the trains, the escalators were not replaced, so from the platforms, a ramp was built to get to the level of the lower end of the escalators.

Currently the underground part of the station is also operating at maximum capacity with train headways being 2 minutes, but with the construction of the North-South Stadtbahn, line 16 will avoid the congested city center tunnel and instead follow the new tunnel to Dom/Hbf.

== HUGO-Passage ==
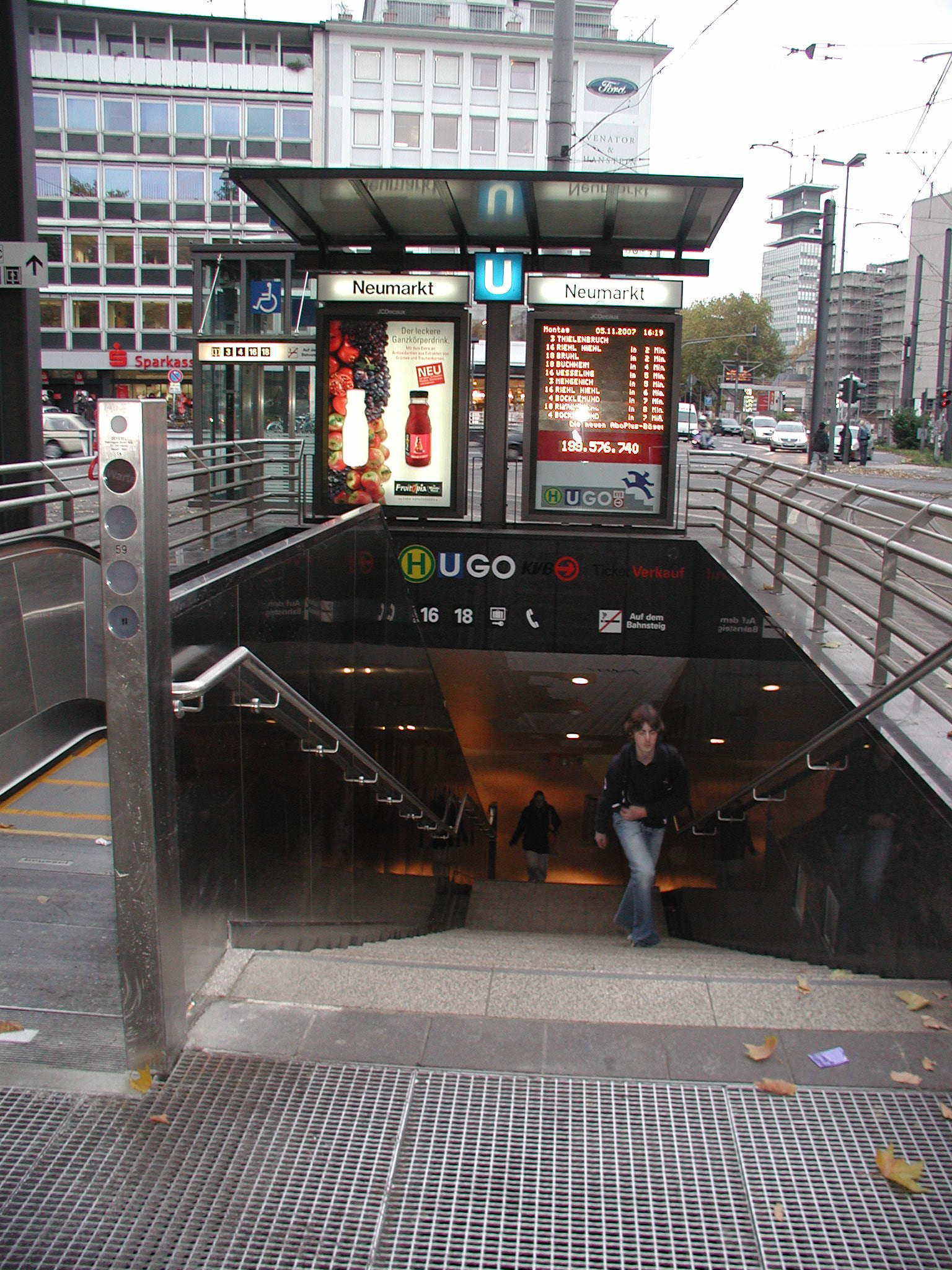
An entrance to the HUGO-Passage

The HUGO-Passage is an underground concourse connecting both parts of the Station and the nearby Schildergasse. Inside, there are shops as well as a service center of the Kölner Verkehrs-Betriebe (Cologne Transport Authority).

The name HUGO-Passage is usually shown by a green H in a yellow circle, the German sign for a tram stop (Haltestelle) representing the overground station, a white U in a blue box, the German sign for an underground (U-Bahn), and the word GO, depicting the possibilities for walkers to use the passage to avoid waiting at traffic lights.

== Notable places nearby ==
- Basilica of the Holy Apostles
- Central Library
- Käthe Kollwitz Museum
- Rautenstrauch Joest Museum
- Schnütgen Museum
- St. Cecilia's Church

== See also ==
- List of Cologne KVB stations
