= Ebertplatz station =

Metro station in Cologne, Germany

Ebertplatz
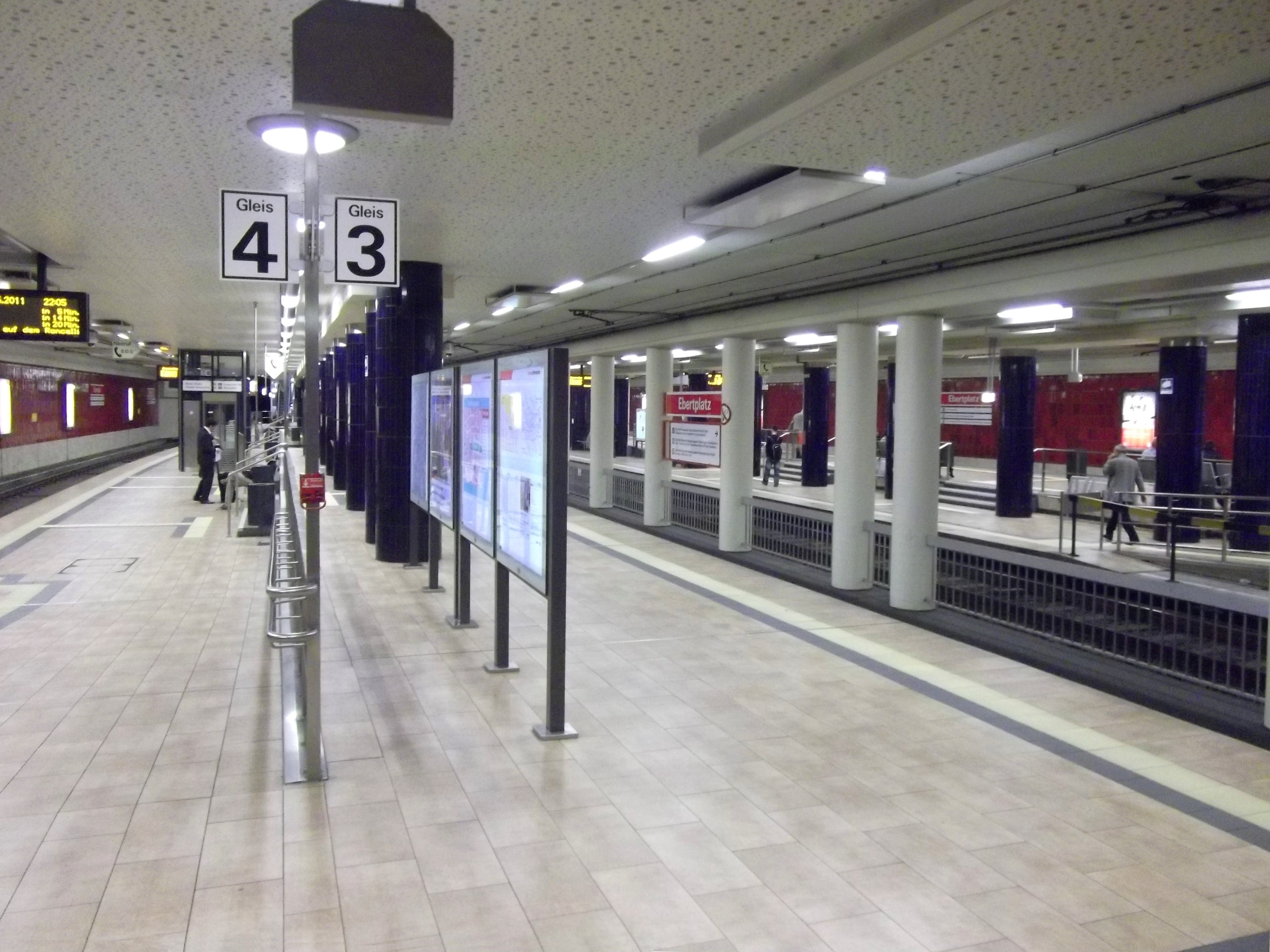
- Ebertplatz station

General information
- Location: Ebertplatz; Cologne
- Coordinates: 50°57′2″N 6°57′31″E
- Owner: Kölner Verkehrs-Betriebe
- Lines: Innenstadt tunnel; Ring tunnel
- Platforms: 2 island platforms
- Tracks: 4
- Connections: KVB: 127, 140, 184

Construction
- Structure type: Underground
- Cycle facilities: Call a Bike
- Accessible: Yes

Other information
- Fare zone: VRS: 2100

History
- Opened: 1974

Services
Preceding station	Cologne Stadtbahn	Following station
Lohsestraße towards Merkenich	Line 12	Köln Hansaring towards Zollstock Südfriedhof
Lohsestraße towards Köln-Chorweiler or Longerich Friedhof	Line 15	Köln Hansaring towards Ubierring
Breslauer Platz/Hauptbahnhof towards Bad Godesberg Stadthalle	Line 16	Reichenspergerplatz towards Niehl Sebastianstraße
Breslauer Platz/Hauptbahnhof towards Bonn Hbf	Line 18	Reichenspergerplatz towards Thielenbruch
Route map
Location

Ebertplatz station is the largest underground station on the Cologne Stadtbahn, and is served by lines 12, 15, 16 and 18. The station lies at Ebertplatz on the Cologne Ring in the district of Innenstadt.

== History ==
The station was opened in 1974 and consists of a mezzanine and two island platforms with four rail tracks. From the beginning, it was built to efficiently handle large passenger volumes, as it features no at-grade crossings of lines like some previous underground stations. Before 2008, the station also offered two side platforms on the outer tracks so passengers could board and leave on both sides. This was due to the fact that the station was also used by single-ended tram cars, so each track had to have a platform on the right. To gain accessibility, the platforms for the trains from and to Dom/Hbf had to be elevated, as high-floor cars operate on this route. However, the other tracks leading to the Ring tunnel are only used by low-floor cars, so the island platforms were split in the middle into a low and a high side. Therefore, the platforms were widened, using the space from the former outer platforms, which were removed.

On the 8th of October 2022, a train of line 18 caught fire while standing at the station. During the incident, six people were injured, and operations had to be stopped for several hours.

== Notable places nearby ==
- Eigelsteintor
- Neusser Straße
- Theodor-Heuss-Ring
- Bastei

== See also ==
- List of Cologne KVB stations
