= Breslauer Platz/Hauptbahnhof station =

Interchange Railway Station in Cologne district of Germany

Breslauer Platz/Hbf
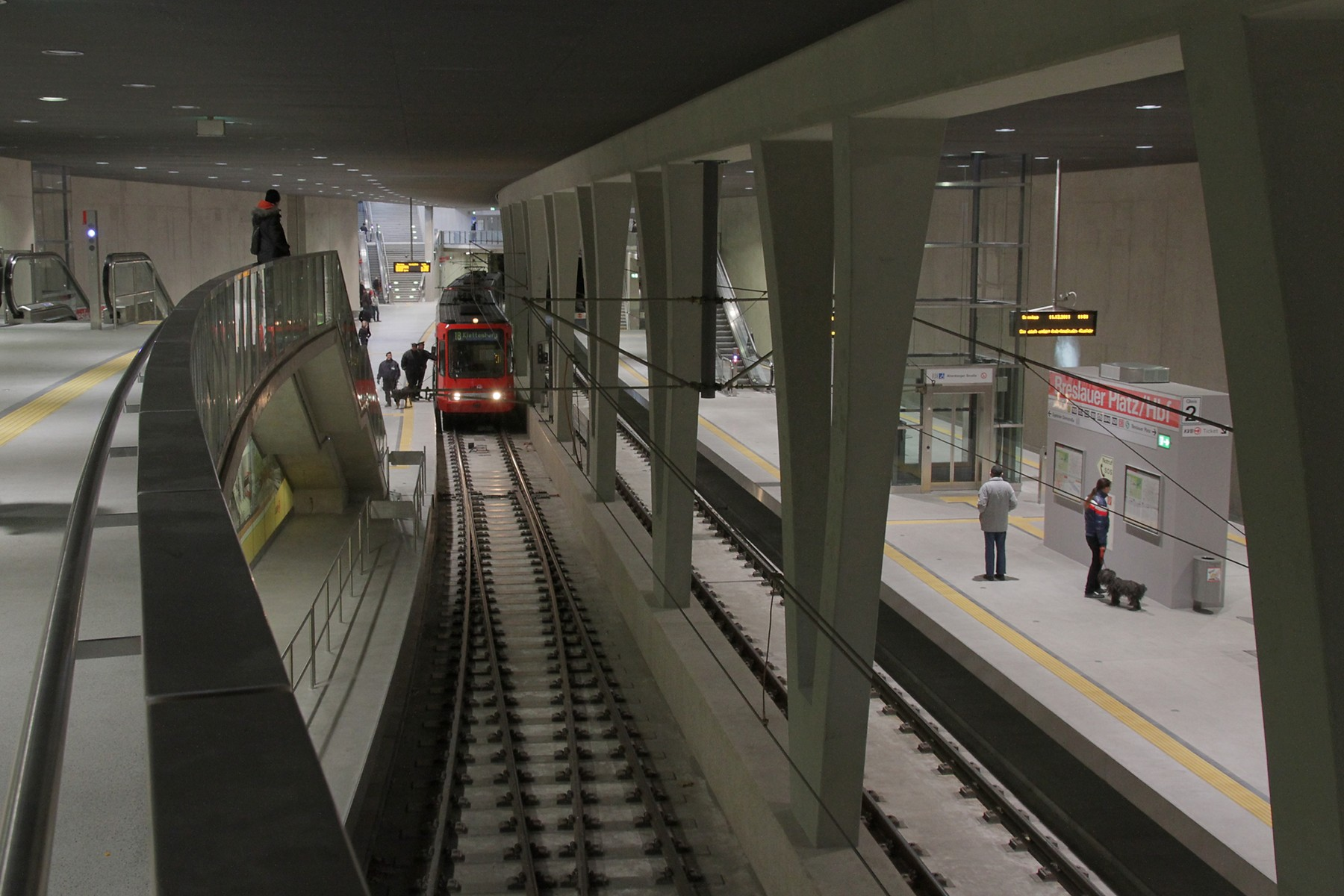
- Breslauer Platz/Hauptbahnhof station

General information
- Location: Breslauer Platz; Cologne
- Coordinates: 50°56′37″N 06°57′34″E
- Owner: Kölner Verkehrs-Betriebe (KVB)
- Lines: Innenstadt Stadtbahn tunnel; North-South Stadtbahn tunnel
- Platforms: 1 side platform, 1 island platform
- Tracks: 3
- Connections: at Köln Hauptbahnhof; KVB: 124, 132, 133, 171; REVG: 978; RVK: N26, 260; Wupsi: SB25, SB40

Construction
- Structure type: Underground
- Accessible: Yes

Other information
- Fare zone: VRS: 2100

History
- Opened: 1970
- Rebuilt: 2006, 2011

Services
Preceding station	Cologne Stadtbahn	Following station
Dom/Hauptbahnhof towards Bad Godesberg Stadthalle	Line 16	Ebertplatz towards Niehl Sebastianstraße
Dom/Hauptbahnhof towards Bonn Hbf	Line 18	Ebertplatz towards Thielenbruch

Future services
Preceding station	Cologne Stadtbahn	Following station
Rathaus towards Bad Godesberg Stadthalle	Line 16	Ebertplatz towards Niehl Sebastianstraße
Location

Breslauer Platz/Hauptbahnhof station (English: Breslauer Place/Main Station, sometimes abbreviated as Breslauer Platz/Hbf) is an underground station on lines 16 and 18 of the Cologne Stadtbahn system. The station is located under the northeast corner of the Köln Hauptbahnhof, the city's main railway station.

== See also ==
- List of Cologne KVB stations
