= Rathaus station (Cologne) =

Railway station in Cologne, Germany

Rathaus
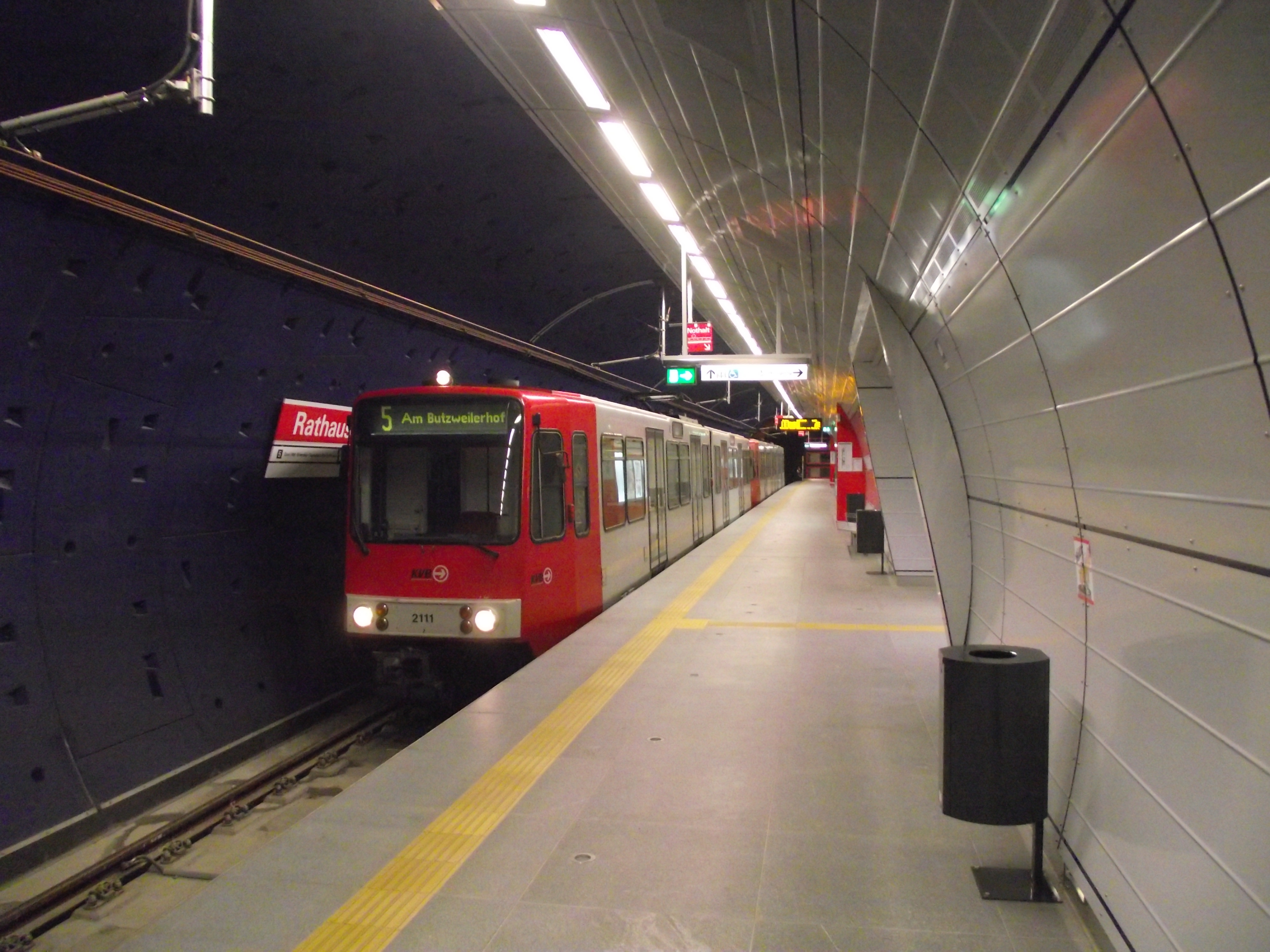
- Rathaus station platform

General information
- Location: Alter Markt; Cologne
- Coordinates: 50°56′19″N 6°57′35″E
- Owner: Kölner Verkehrs-Betriebe
- Line: North-South Stadtbahn tunnel
- Platforms: 2 side platforms
- Tracks: 2

Construction
- Structure type: Underground

Other information
- Fare zone: VRS: 2100

History
- Opened: 9 December 2012

Services
Preceding station	Cologne Stadtbahn	Following station
Dom/Hauptbahnhof towards Sparkasse Am Butzweilerhof	Line 5	Heumarkt Terminus

Future services
Preceding station	Cologne Stadtbahn	Following station
Breslauer Platz/Hauptbahnhof towards Niehl Sebastianstraße	Line 16	Heumarkt towards Bad Godesberg Stadthalle
Location

Rathaus station is an underground station in Cologne, Germany. It is located below the Alter Markt and is named after the Cologne City Hall (German: Rathaus).

== History ==
The construction of the station started in 2002 as part of the new North-South Stadtbahn tunnel (German: Nord-Süd Stadtbahn). The station was opened on 9 December 2012 and was the terminus of line 5 until the opening of Heumarkt station on 15 December 2013.

== Services ==
When the North-South Stadtbahn tunnel is completed, Rathaus will also be served by line 16.

== Design ==
The wall is designed with a defamiliarised sentence:

WANDGESTALTUNGNORDSÜDSTADTBAHNKÖLNHALTESTELLERATHAUSRICHTUNGSÜD

Which translates to:

Wall design North-South line Cologne station Rathaus southbound

== See also ==
- List of Cologne KVB stations
