= Heumarkt station =

Railway station in Cologne, Germany

Heumarkt
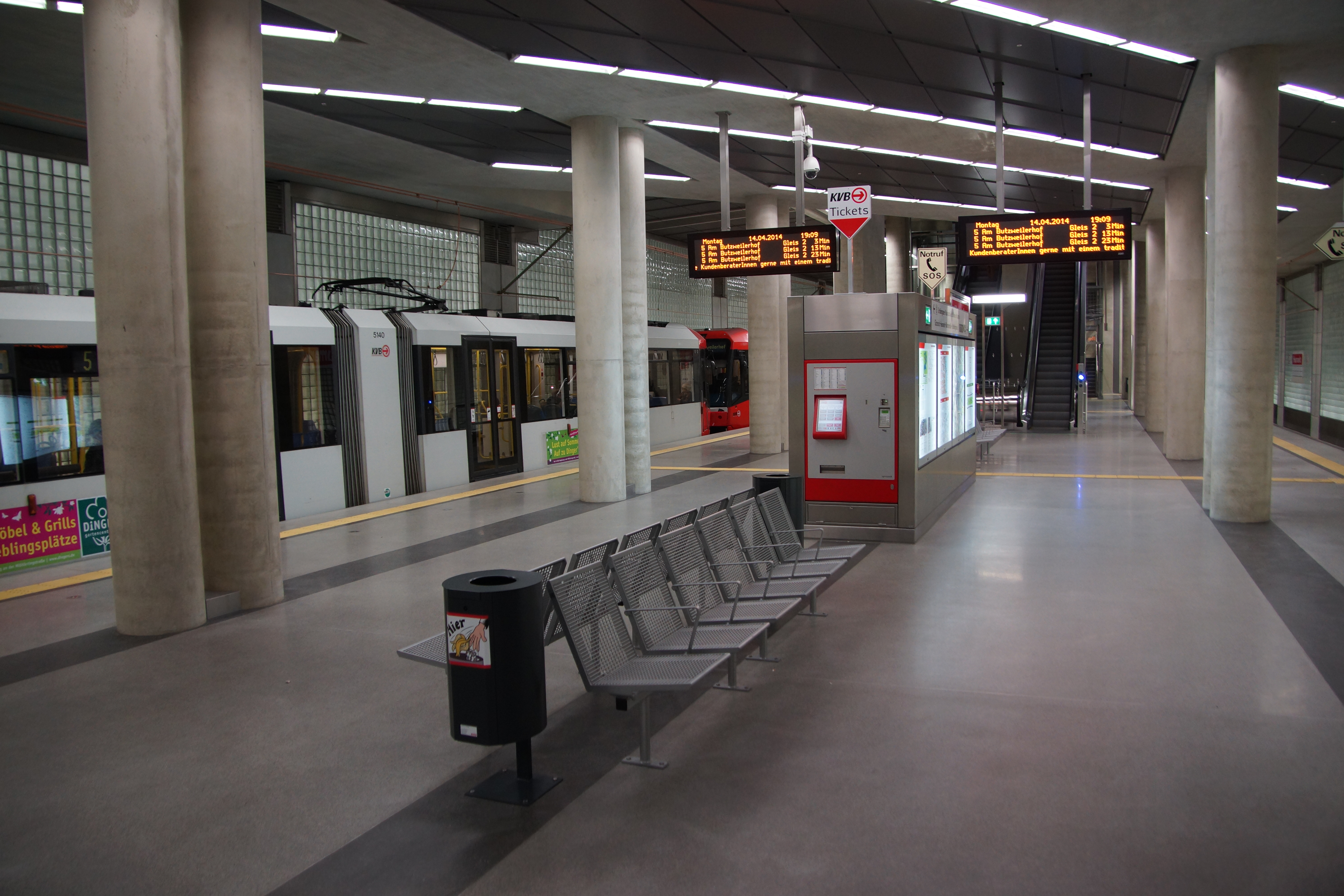
- Heumarkt station platform

General information
- Location: Heumarkt; Cologne
- Coordinates: 50°56′8″N 06°57′35″E
- Owner: Kölner Verkehrs-Betriebe
- Lines: North-South Stadtbahn tunnel; East-West Stadtbahn line
- Platforms: 2 side platforms, 1 island platform
- Tracks: 4
- Connections: KVB: 106, 132, 133, 260; REVG: 978; RVK: N26, 260; Wupsi: SB25; Rhine River docks

Construction
- Structure type: Underground; At-grade
- Accessible: Yes

Other information
- Fare zone: VRS: 2100

History
- Opened: c. 1950
- Rebuilt: 1994, 2013

Services
Preceding station	Cologne Stadtbahn	Following station
At-grade platforms
Neumarkt towards Köln-Weiden West	Line 1	Deutzer Freiheit towards Bensberg
Neumarkt towards Frechen-Benzelrath	Line 7	Deutzer Freiheit towards Zündorf
Neumarkt towards Sülz Hermeskeiler Platz	Line 9	Deutzer Freiheit towards Königsforst
Underground platform
Rathaus towards Sparkasse Am Butzweilerhof	Line 5	Terminus

Future services
Preceding station	Cologne Stadtbahn	Following station
Underground platform
Rathaus towards Sparkasse Am Butzweilerhof	Line 5	Severinstraße towards Marktstraße
Rathaus towards Bad Godesberg Stadthalle	Line 16	Severinstraße towards Niehl Sebastianstraße
Route map
Location

Heumarkt station is a Stadtbahn interchange station in the historic Altstadt (old town) of Cologne, Western Germany. The station is an important hub between (low-floor) East-West and (high-floor) North-South connections.

== History ==
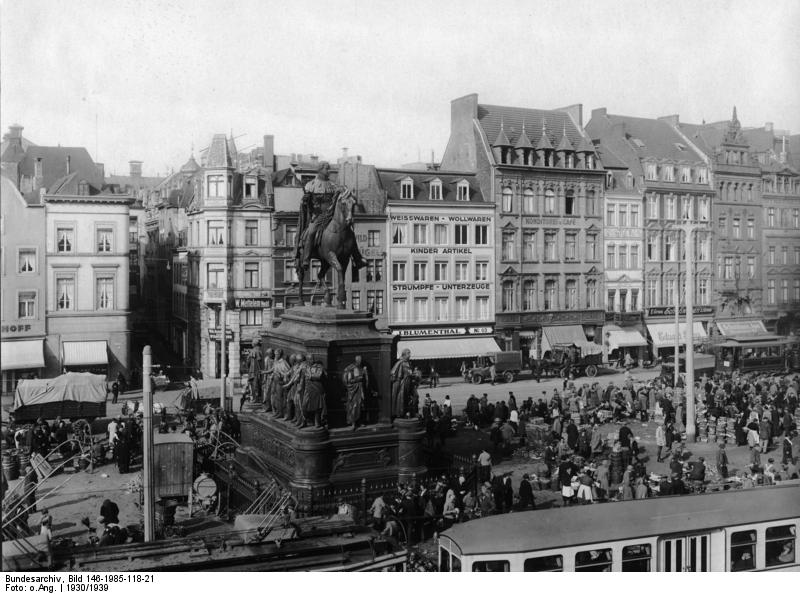
Trams on Heumarkt, circa 1930

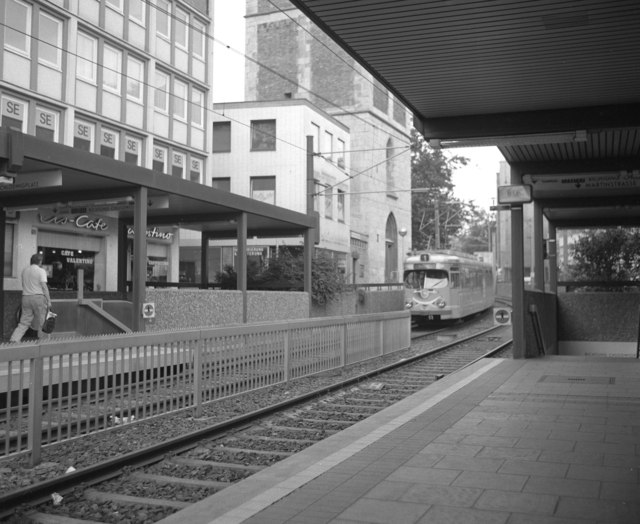
At-grade platforms, circa 1980

The station is named after one of Cologne's busiest old-town squares, on which it is also located and − to a less favorable extent − whose built environment it has shaped for the last 40 years.

Public transport at Heumarkt began in 1879, with several horsecar lines encircling the square. Connections were provided to Dome and Central Station to the North, Neumarkt and Ring to the West, and Rodenkirchen in the South. By 1902 lines throughout the city were upgraded to electric tram lines, with tram stops on Heumarkt's eastern and western sides. With completion of the Deutz Suspension Bridge in 1915, service was complemented with suburban rail connections into Cologne's left-Rhenish districts. Due to the square's proximity to the Rhine, a single station within the bridge's head was planned, but never realized.

By 1950, the square was served by one tram station, with lines crossing the square midway. Service was restricted to East-West connections, while North-South connections were redirected along the Cologne Ring.

During the early 1970s, the former tram system was converted to the currently used Stadtbahn system. This resulted in an extended feeder for the bridge and − in order to obtain exclusive right-of-way for the trains − fences, a level-crossing and traffic-signals for pedestrians. Consequently, the square was split in two: a larger northern part and a smaller, more neglected southern part.

The station was rebuilt in 1994 to accomidate low-floor trains as part of the effoert to build out a shared East-West Stadtbahn corridor.

In conjunction with the Stadtbahn's extension project called North-South Stadtbahn (German: Nord-Süd Stadtbahn), Heumarkt was meant to regain its hub functions. The project's intention is to more directly link the Hauptbahnhof with Cologne's southern districts, with Heumarkt station in-between. With the project currently halfway through, Heumarkt's underground station was opened on 15 December 2013. It is currently (2022) the southern terminal station for line 5, but with completion of the project will also include line 16, then running all the way to Bonn. The total costs for the station were €90 million. It lies 27 meters below ground-level, making it the city's deepest station. One of the reasons for this is provisions for in the future to potentially also accommodate the East-West line within the underground station. At this stage however, putting the East-West line below ground is not under further consideration.

== Notable places nearby ==
- Church of St. Maria im Kapitol
- Church of St. Maria Lyskirchen
- Gürzenich
- Overstolzenhaus
- Rheinauhafen within walking distance

== See also ==
- List of Cologne KVB stations
- Transport in Cologne
