= Reichenspergerplatz station =

Railway station in Cologne, Germany

Reichenspergerplatz
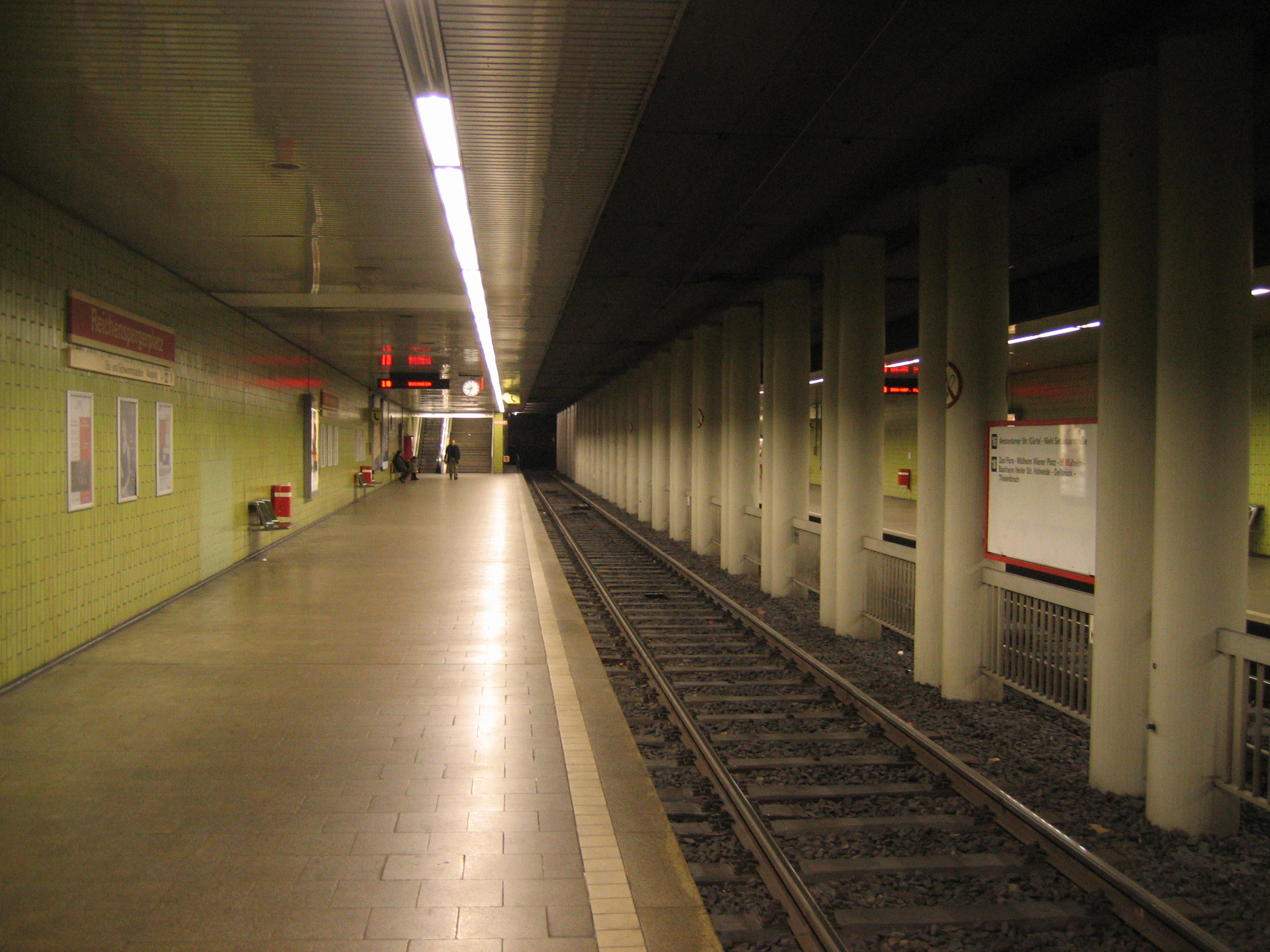
- Reichenspergerplatz station

General information
- Location: Reichenspergerplatz; 50668 Köln
- Coordinates: 50°57′13″N 6°57′48″E
- Owner: Kölner Verkehrs-Betriebe
- Platforms: 2 side platforms
- Connections: Bus, Taxi

Construction
- Structure type: Underground

Other information
- Fare zone: VRS: 2100

History
- Opened: 1974

Services
Preceding station	Cologne Stadtbahn	Following station
Ebertplatz towards Bad Godesberg Stadthalle	Line 16	Kinderkrankenhaus towards Niehl Sebastianstraße
Ebertplatz towards Bonn Hbf	Line 18	Zoo/Flora towards Thielenbruch
Route map
Location

Reichenspergerplatz is an underground station on the Cologne Stadtbahn lines 16 and 18, located in Cologne. The station lies at Reichenspergerplatz in the district of Innenstadt.

The station was opened in 1974 and consists of a mezzanine and two side platforms with two rail tracks. Line 5 trains terminated at this station, used an underground loop that leaves from the outbound track to Niehl, and then joined with the inbound track from Buchheim.

== Notable places nearby ==
- Oberlandesgericht
- St. Agnes
- Neusser Straße

== See also ==
- List of Cologne KVB stations
