= Deutzer Freiheit station =

Interchange station

Coordinates: 50°56′12″N 6°58′14″E

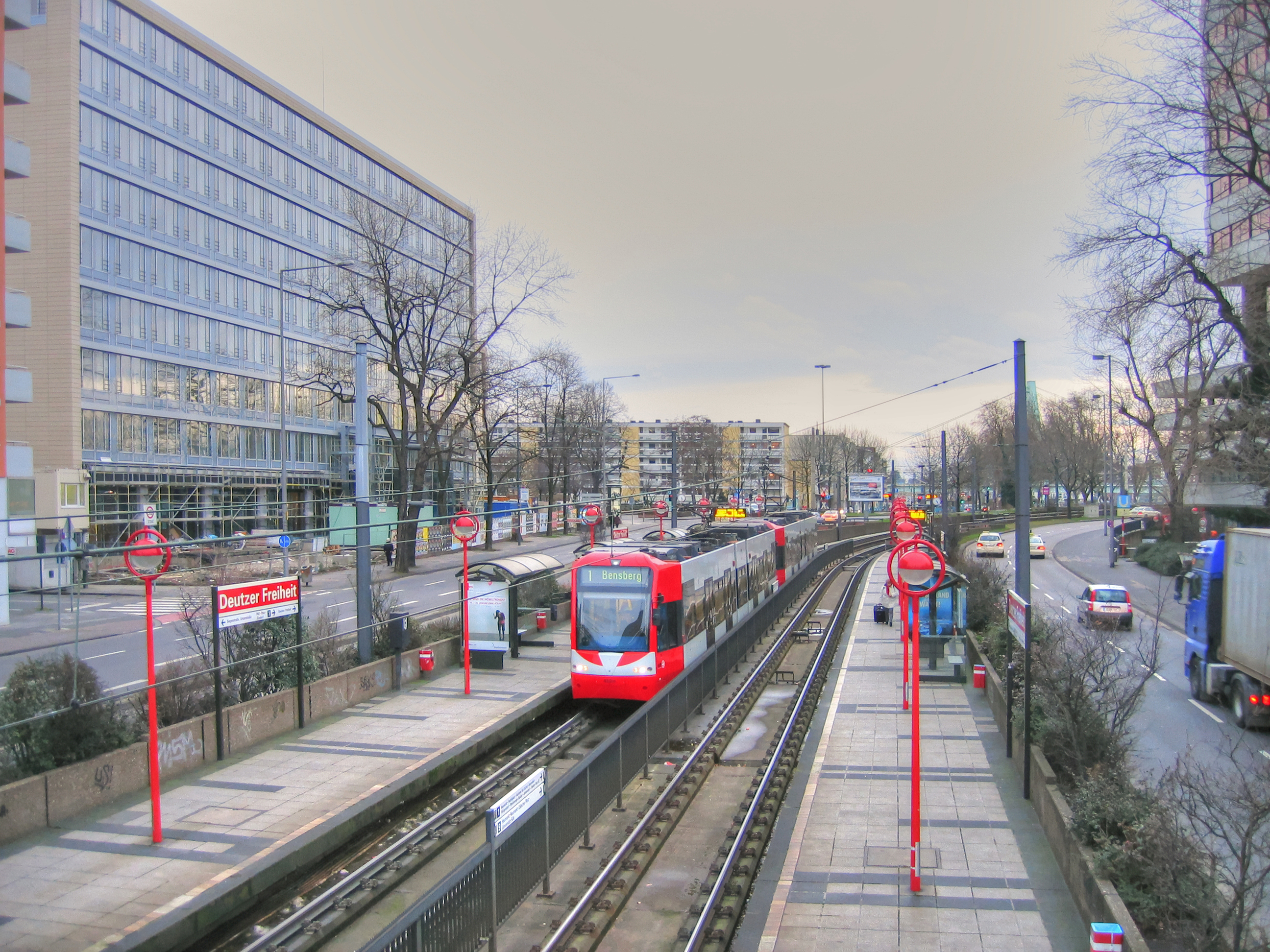
KVB Deutzer Freiheit

Deutzer Freiheit is an interchange station on the Cologne Stadtbahn lines 1, 7 and 9, located in the Cologne district of Deutz.

== Stations adjacent to Deutzer Freiheit station ==
Preceding station	Cologne Stadtbahn	Following station
Köln Heumarkt towards Köln-Weiden West	Line 1	Köln Messe/Deutz towards Bensberg
Köln Heumarkt towards Frechen-Benzelrath	Line 7	Köln Severinsbrücke towards Zündorf
Köln Heumarkt towards Sülz Hermeskeiler Platz	Line 9	Köln Messe/Deutz towards Königsforst

== See also ==
- List of Cologne KVB stations
