= Call a Bike =

Bike rental service in Germany

Call a Bike logo

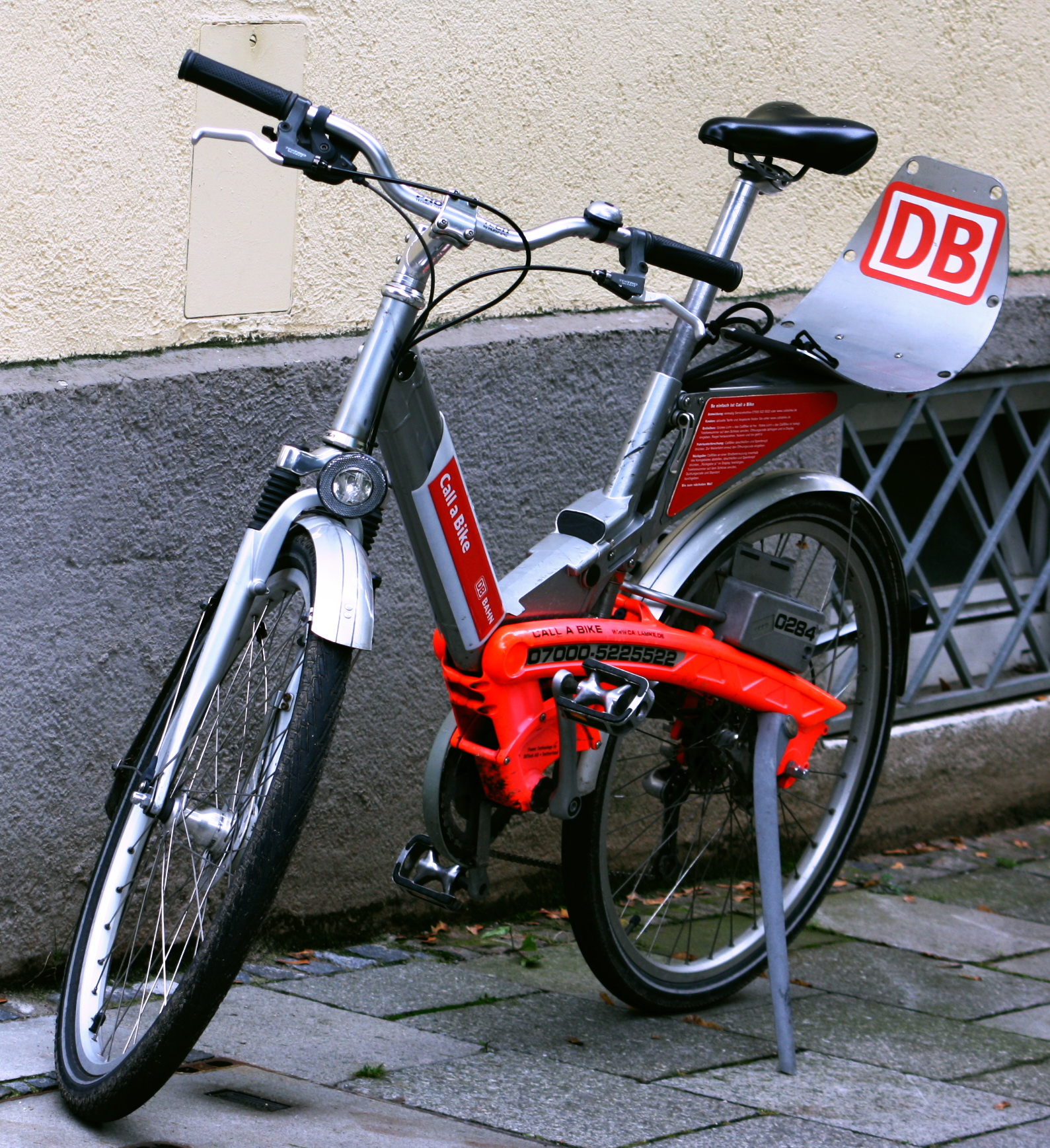
Call a Bike in Munich

Call a Bike is a bicycle-sharing system operated by Deutsche Bahn in Germany. It operates urban networks in several German cities, including Berlin, Munich, Cologne, and provides bicycles at ICE railway stations.

Bicycles are located and rented through the Call a Bike mobile app and unlocked by scanning a QR code.

Deutsche Bahn also operates related bicycle-sharing systems under the StadtRAD brand.

== History ==
Call a Bike was founded in Munich in 1997 by Christian Hogl and Josef Gundel. The service began operating in Munich in 2000 and rentals were initially made by telephone, with users receiving a numerical code to unlock the bicycle.

After the original company became insolvent, Deutsche Bahn acquired the Call a Bike brand, bicycles and patents in 2001, and relaunched the service in Munich later that year. It subsequently expanded to Berlin, Frankfurt am Main and Cologne.

== Coverage ==
Call a Bike operates urban bicycle-sharing networks in Berlin, Munich, Cologne, Frankfurt am Main, Darmstadt and Offenbach. Bicycles are also available at selected ICE railway stations.

Deutsche Bahn bicycle-sharing systems also operate under the StadtRAD brand in Hamburg and Lüneburg, and as RegioRadStuttgart in Stuttgart.

== Technology ==
Available bicycles and rental stations are shown in the Call a Bike mobile app. Bicycles are unlocked by scanning a QR code or selecting them in the app, which releases the electronic lock. At the end of a rental, bicycles are generally returned to designated Call a Bike stations and locked again.

The current rental system was introduced during a fleet and technology update in 2021, which included a new electronic locking system and QR-code-based rental through the redesigned app.

== See also ==
- Transport in Germany
- Outline of cycling
