= Sparkasse Am Butzweilerhof station =

Railway station in Germany

Coordinates: 50°59′6″N 6°53′16″E

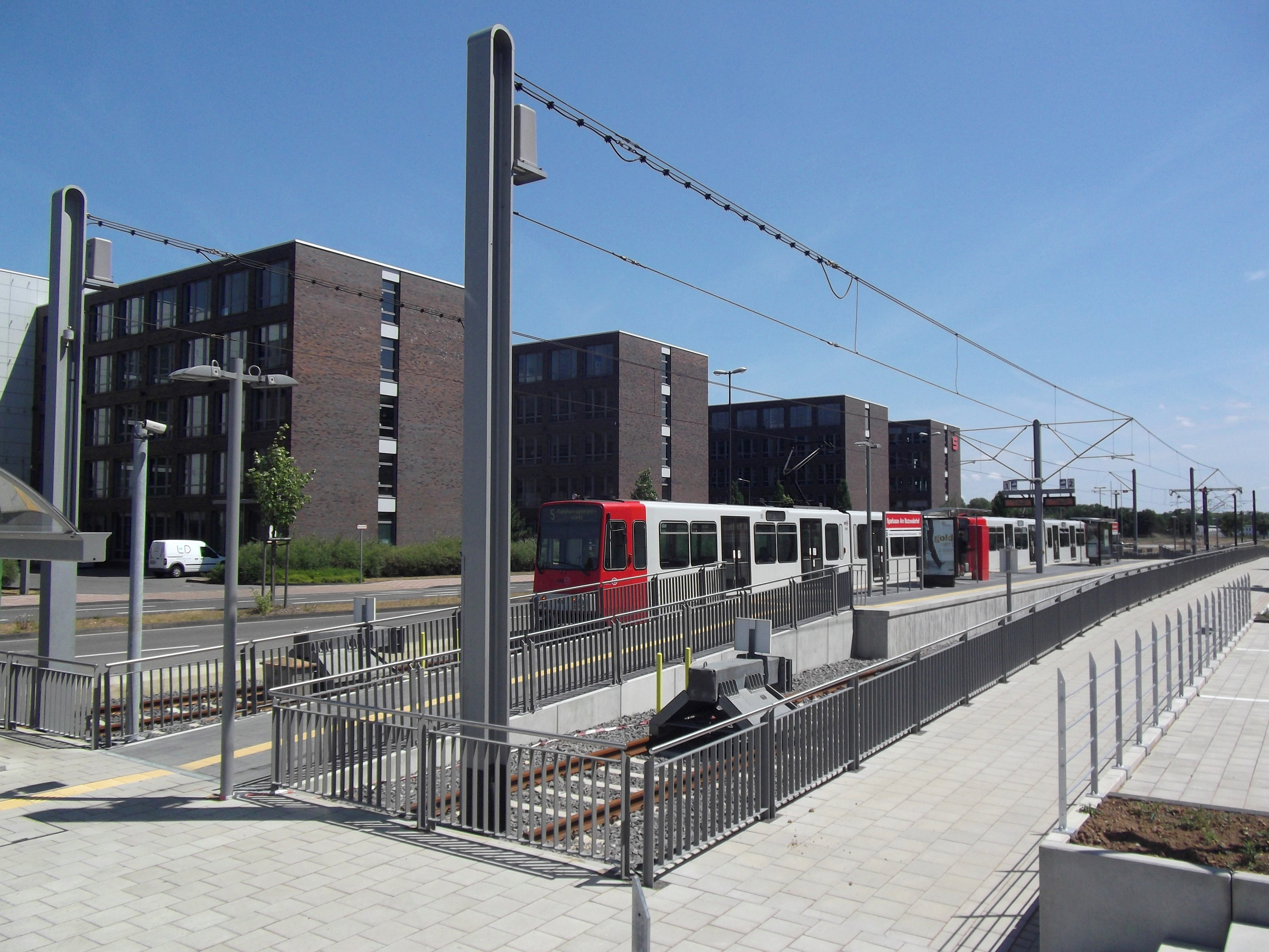
Sparkasse am Butzweilerhof station in 2011

Sparkasse Am Butzweilerhof is a terminus station on the Cologne Stadtbahn line 5, located in the Cologne district of Ossendorf. The station lies on Von-Hünefeld-Straße, the center of a large media and business park of Coloneum, RTL Television and NetCologne.

Station and the entire neighborhood is named after the former Cologne Butzweilerhof Airport. It was opened on 12. December 2010 and consists of one island platform with two rail tracks.

== See also ==
- List of Cologne KVB stations

Preceding station	Cologne Stadtbahn	Following station
Terminus	Line 5	IKEA Am Butzweilerhof towards Heumarkt
