= Niehl Sebastianstraße station =

Railway station in Germany

Coordinates: 50°59′6″N 6°57′40″E

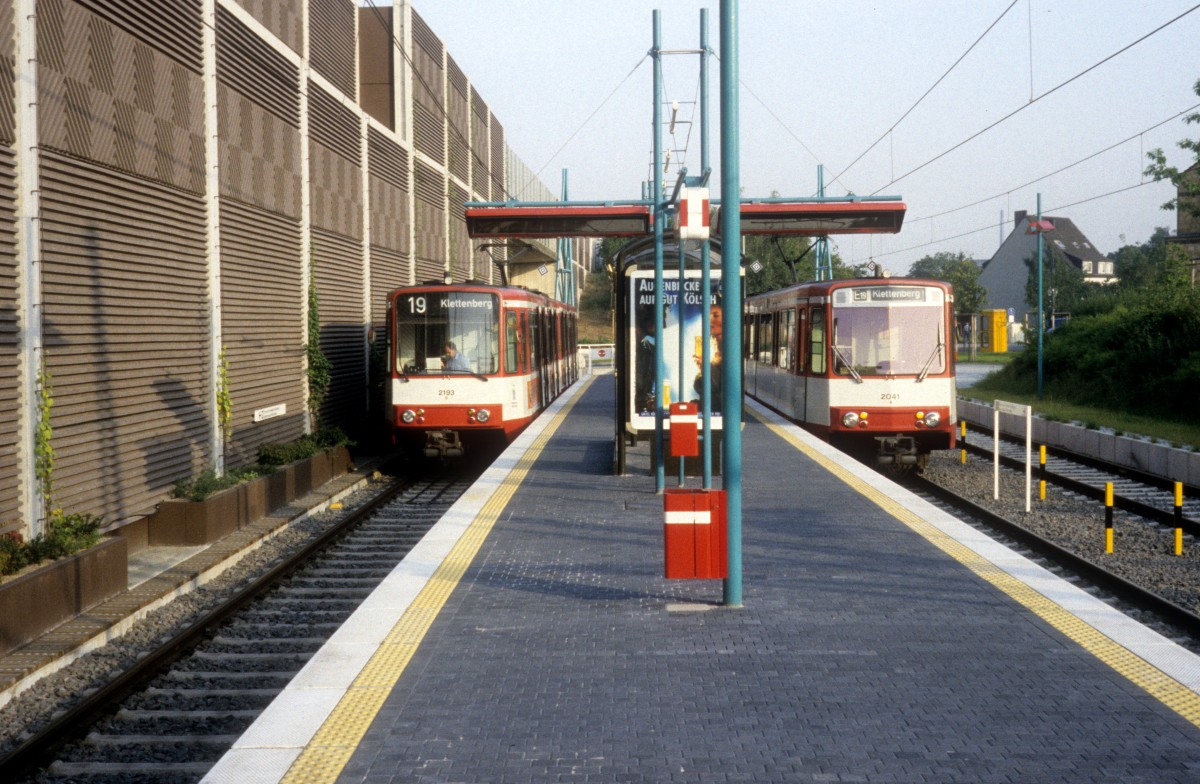
Niehl Sebastianstraße in 1992

map of line 16 in Niehl. The line's sections below ground are marked in black. From Reichenspergerplatz southwards, it stays below ground.

Niehl Sebastianstraße is the northern terminal station of Cologne Stadtbahn line 16, located in the Cologne district of Niehl. The station was opened in 1992. The first stop for trains heading towards Köln Klettenbergpark.

== See also ==
- List of Cologne KVB stations

Preceding station	Cologne Stadtbahn	Following station
Nesselrodestraße towards Bad Godesberg Stadthalle	Line 16	Terminus
