= Bad Godesberg Stadthalle station =

Stadtbahn Station in Bonn, Germany

Coordinates: 50.6804°N 7.1584°E

Bad Godesberg Stadthalle
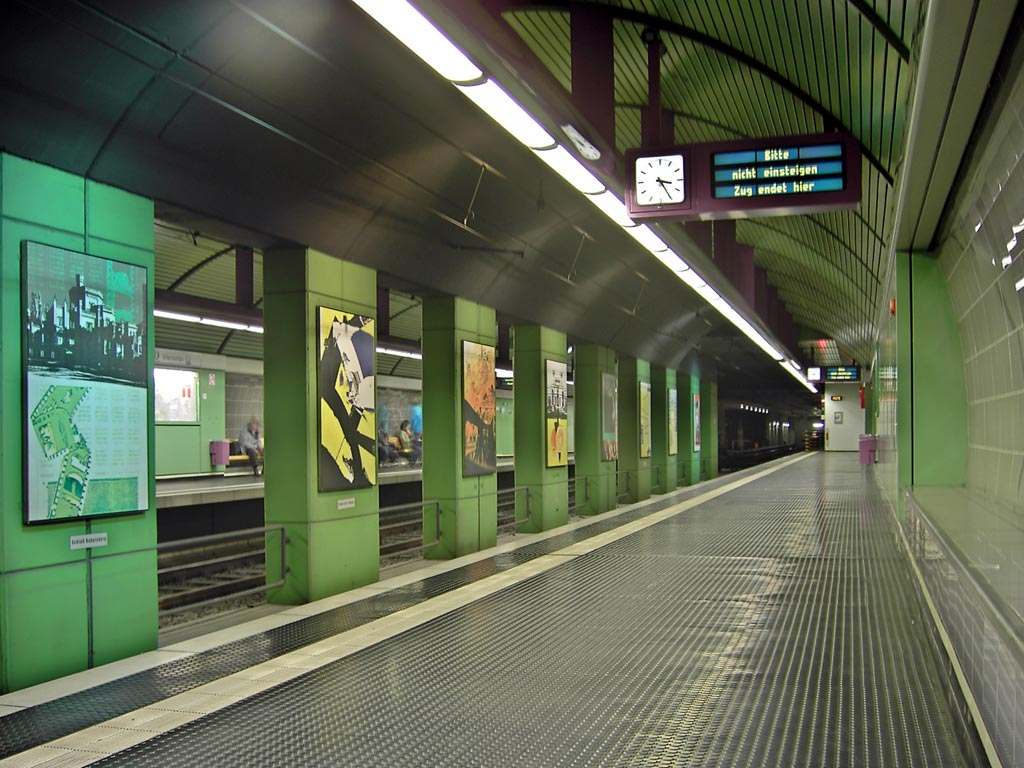

General information
- System: Bonn Stadtbahn station
- Operator: Bonn Stadtbahn
- Platforms: 2 side platforms
- Tracks: 2

Construction
- Structure type: Underground

Other information
- Fare zone: VRS: 2600

Services
Preceding station	Bonn Stadtbahn	Following station
Bonn-Bad Godesberg towards Niehl Sebastianstraße	Line 16	Terminus
Bonn-Bad Godesberg towards Tannenbusch Mitte	Line 63	Terminus
Bonn-Bad Godesberg towards Siegburg/Bonn	Line 67	Terminus
Location

Bad Godesberg Stadthalle is a station on the Bonn Stadtbahn, in Bad Godesberg, Germany. It is the terminus of the Bad Godesberg branch served by the all-day routes 16 and 63 and the peak-hour line 67. It is located beneath the Bad Godesberg Stadthalle, an events space.
