= Zoo/Flora station =

Railway station in Cologne, Germany

Zoo/Flora
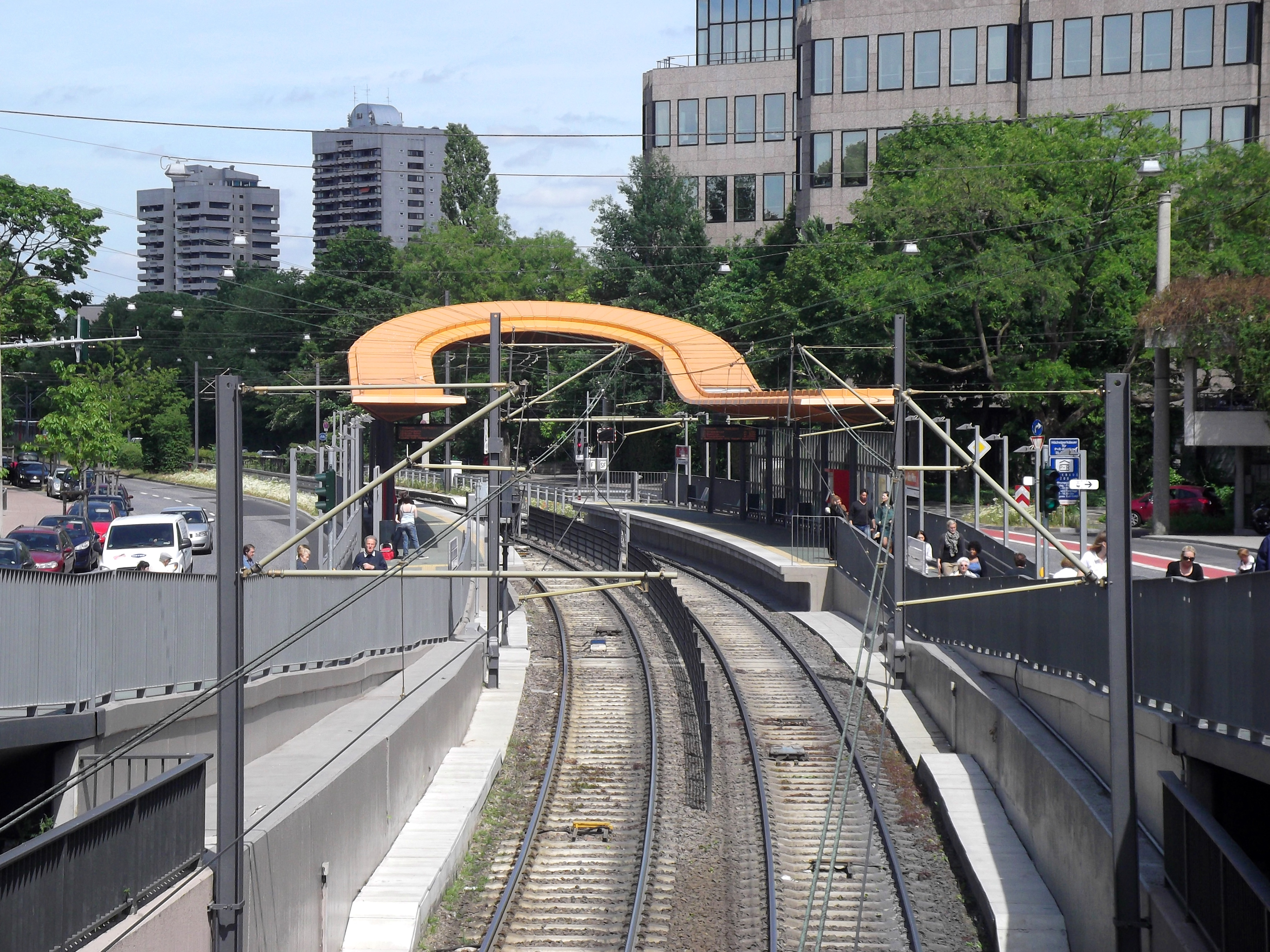
- Zoo/Flora station in 2011

General information
- Coordinates: 50°57′27″N 6°58′25″E
- Owner: Kölner Verkehrs-Betriebe (KVB)
- Platforms: 2 side platforms
- Tracks: 2

Construction
- Structure type: At-grade
- Accessible: Yes

History
- Opened: 1974
- Rebuilt: 2010

Services
Preceding station	Cologne Stadtbahn	Following station
Reichenspergerplatz towards Bonn Hbf	Line 18	Boltensternstraße towards Thielenbruch
Location

Zoo/Flora is a station on the Cologne Stadtbahn line 18, located in the Cologne district of Nippes. The station lies on Riehler Straße, adjacent to nearby Cologne Zoological Garden and Flora & Botanischer Garten, after which the station is named. Also within walking distance lies a station of the Cologne Cable Car (Seilbahn).

The station was opened in 1974, substantially renovated in 2010, and consists of two side platforms with two rail tracks.

== See also ==
- List of Cologne KVB stations
