= Cologne Cable Car =

Gondola lift in Cologne, Germany

Coordinates: 50°57′16″N 6°58′31″E

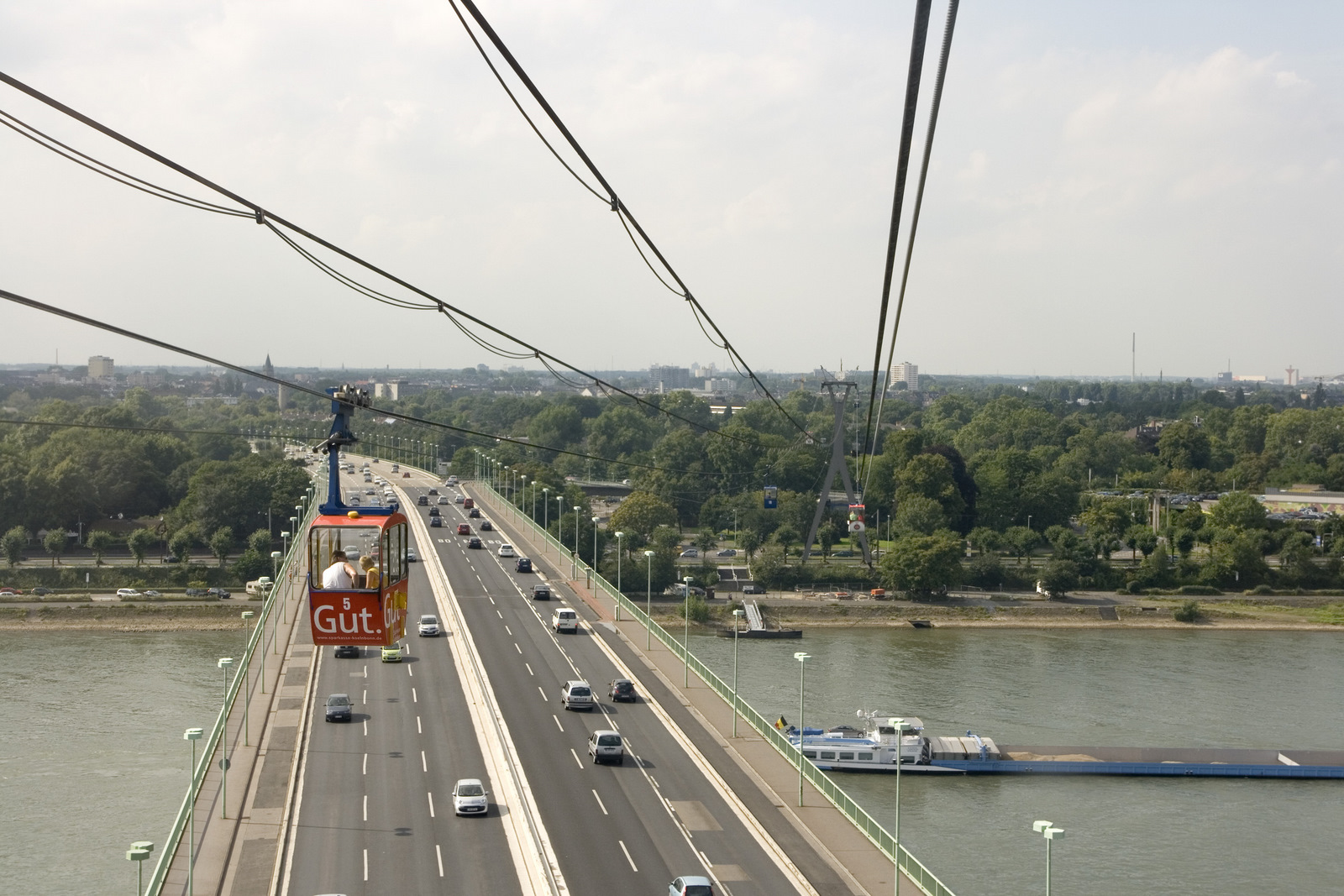
Cologne Cable Car crosses Rhine

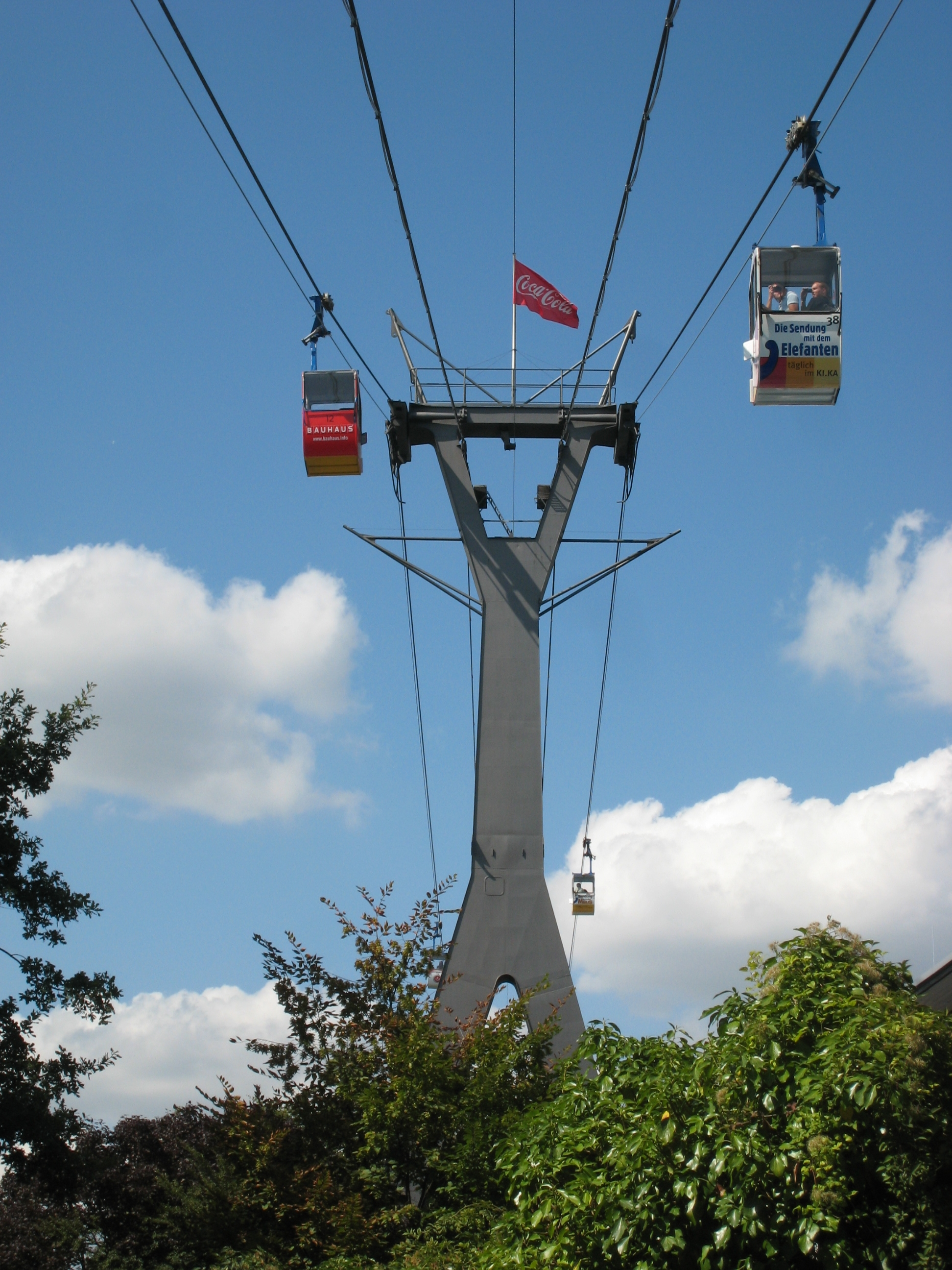
One of the two pylons

The Cologne Cable Car (German: Kölner Seilbahn or Rheinseilbahn (Köln)) is a gondola lift that runs across the river Rhine in Cologne, Germany. It connects the two banks of the Rhine at the height of Cologne's Zoo Bridge (Zoobrücke).

== History ==
The cable car over the Rhine was opened on April 26, 1957 in time for the opening of the biannual German horticultural show, the Bundesgartenschau; it connects the exhibition sites at Rheinpark with those on the other riverside, close to Cologne Zoo and Flora/Botanical Garden. Amongst its first guest were the President of Germany, Theodor Heuss, and Federal Chancellor and former Mayor of Cologne, Konrad Adenauer. In 2010 in Koblenz another aerial tram crossing the Rhine opened, because of the 2011 edition of the Bundesgartenschau.

In 1963, the cableway was closed and dismantled because it stood on land needed for the new Zoo Bridge. It was reopened after protracted discussions, but the route had to be changed in response to irritated drivers who did not want the cable car over the bridge. The suspension tower was slightly turned and the support was moved to a location in the Rhine Park. The new extended Rhine cableway re-opened on 22 August 1966. The Stadtbahn station at Zoo/Flora opened in 1974. Today, the cable cars cross the thermal baths known as the Claudius Therme, which were built later in the Rheinpark (Rhine Park).

From 1957 to 2004 the cable car transported 13.7 million people without an accident; and in 2004, it carried 288,500 passengers. It is considered to be Cologne's safest means of transport. Starting in 2004, the cable car ran at night for special occasions and since that year it has been profitable. Kölner Seilbahn operates the tramway, which since 1998 has been a subsidiary of the Kölner Verkehrs-Betriebe, the city's public transit operator.

== Specifications ==
- The Cologne Cable Car is open daily from April through October.
- 50 cabins can carry up to 2,000 persons per hour.
- Length: 935 metres
- Diameter/carrying capacity of the cable:
  - Carrying rope: 45 millimeters/230,280 kg
  - Hauling cable: 22 millimeters/30,000 kg

== See also ==
- List of gondola lifts
