= Neusser Straße/Gürtel station =

Railway station in Cologne, Germany

Coordinates: 50°58′20″N 6°57′4″E

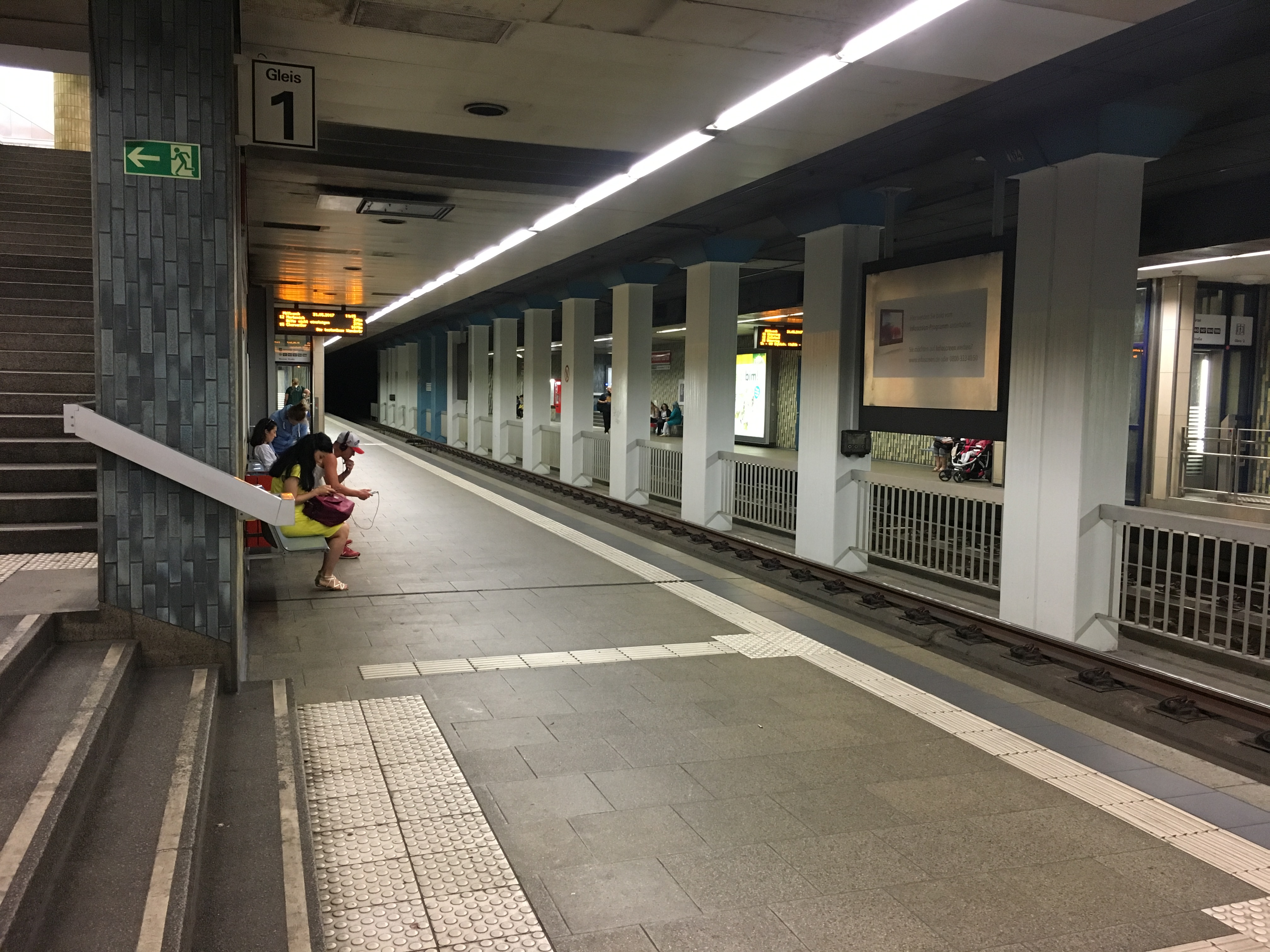
Underground platforms of Neusser Straße/Gürtel station in 2017

Neusser Straße/Gürtel is an interchange station on the Cologne Stadtbahn lines 12, 13 and 15, located in the Cologne district of Nippes, Germany. The station lies on the Neusser Straße at the place where the Cologne Belt road (Gürtel) would have intersected it, if this section of it had been built. Even though the street was never built, the station carries the street name in its name.

The station was opened in 1974 and consists of an elevated and an underground station, each with two side platforms and two rail tracks.

== See also ==
- List of Cologne KVB stations

Preceding station	Cologne Stadtbahn	Following station
Mollwitzstraße towards Merkenich	Line 12	Florastraße towards Zollstock Südfriedhof
Köln Geldernstraße/Parkgürtel towards Sülzgürtel	Line 13	Amsterdamer Straße/Gürtel towards Holweide Vischeringstraße
Mollwitzstraße towards Köln-Chorweiler or Longerich Friedhof	Line 15	Florastraße towards Ubierring
