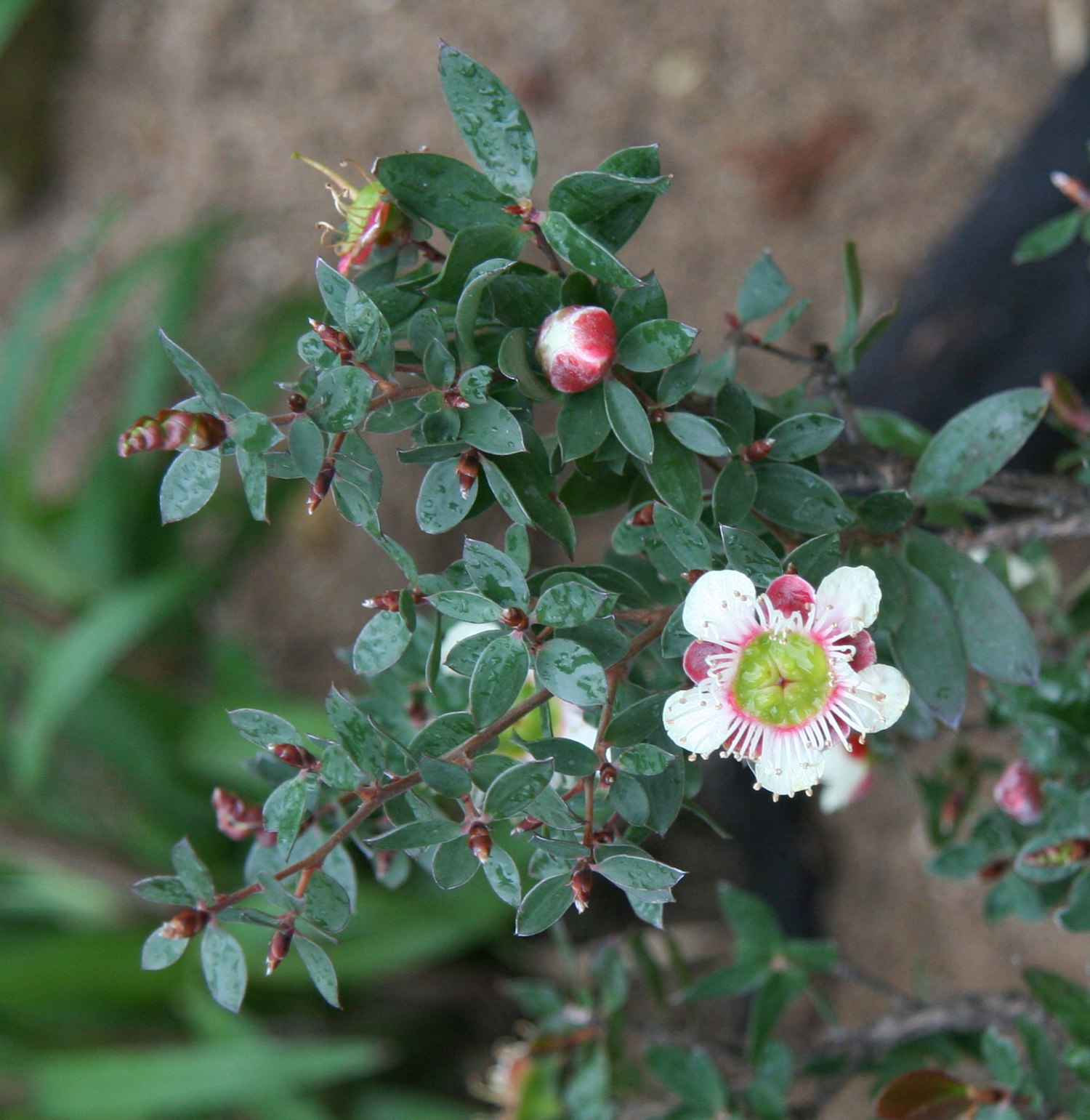
- In the Cologne Botanic Garden

Scientific classification
- Kingdom: Plantae
- Clade: Tracheophytes
- Clade: Angiosperms
- Clade: Eudicots
- Clade: Rosids
- Order: Myrtales
- Family: Myrtaceae
- Genus: Leptospermum
- Species: L. macrocarpum

Binomial name
- Leptospermum macrocarpum (Maiden & Betche) Joy Thomps.

Synonyms
- Leptospermum lanigerum var. macrocarpum Maiden & Betche

= Leptospermum macrocarpum =

Australian species of plant

Leptospermum macrocarpum is a species of shrub that is endemic to the Blue Mountains in New South Wales. It has thin, hard, sometimes gnarled bark on the older stems, broadly elliptical leaves, relatively large white, pink or dark red flowers and large fruit.

== Description ==
Leptospermum macrocarpum is a shrub that typically grows to a height of 2 m (6 ft 7 in) and has thin, rough, sometimes gnarled bark and young stems that are hairy at first. Its leaves are broadly elliptical, mostly 10–20 mm (0.39–0.79 in) long and 5–10 mm (0.20–0.39 in) wide on a short but distinct petiole. The flowers are greenish white, pink or dark red, 15–30 mm (0.59–1.18 in) wide and arranged singly on short side shoots. There are large, broad, reddish brown bracts at the base of the flower buds but these are shed before the flower opens. The floral cup is 4–8 mm (0.16–0.31 in) long, covered with long silky hairs, the sepals broadly egg-shaped to round, 7–8 mm (0.28–0.31 in) long, the petals 4–8 mm (0.16–0.31 in) long and the stamens 6–9 mm (0.24–0.35 in) long. Flowering occurs from October to December and the fruit is a woody capsule 15–20 mm (0.59–0.79 in) wide that is not shed when mature.

== Taxonomy and naming ==
This tea-tree was first formally described in 1898 by Joseph Maiden and Betche who gave it the name Leptospermum lanigerum var. macrocarpum and published the description in the Linnean Society of New South Wales from specimens collected by Jesse Gregson on Mt Tomah in 1897. In 1989, Joy Thompson raised the variety to species status as Leptospermum macrocarpum. The specific epithet (macrocarpum) is derived from the ancient Greek words makros (μακρός), meaning 'long', and karpos (καρπός), meaning 'fruit'.

== Distribution and habitat ==
Leptospermum macrocarpum grows in heath or forest on exposed sandstone in the Blue Mountains.
