= Florastraße station =

Railway station in Cologne, Germany

Coordinates: 50°57′53″N 6°57′13″E

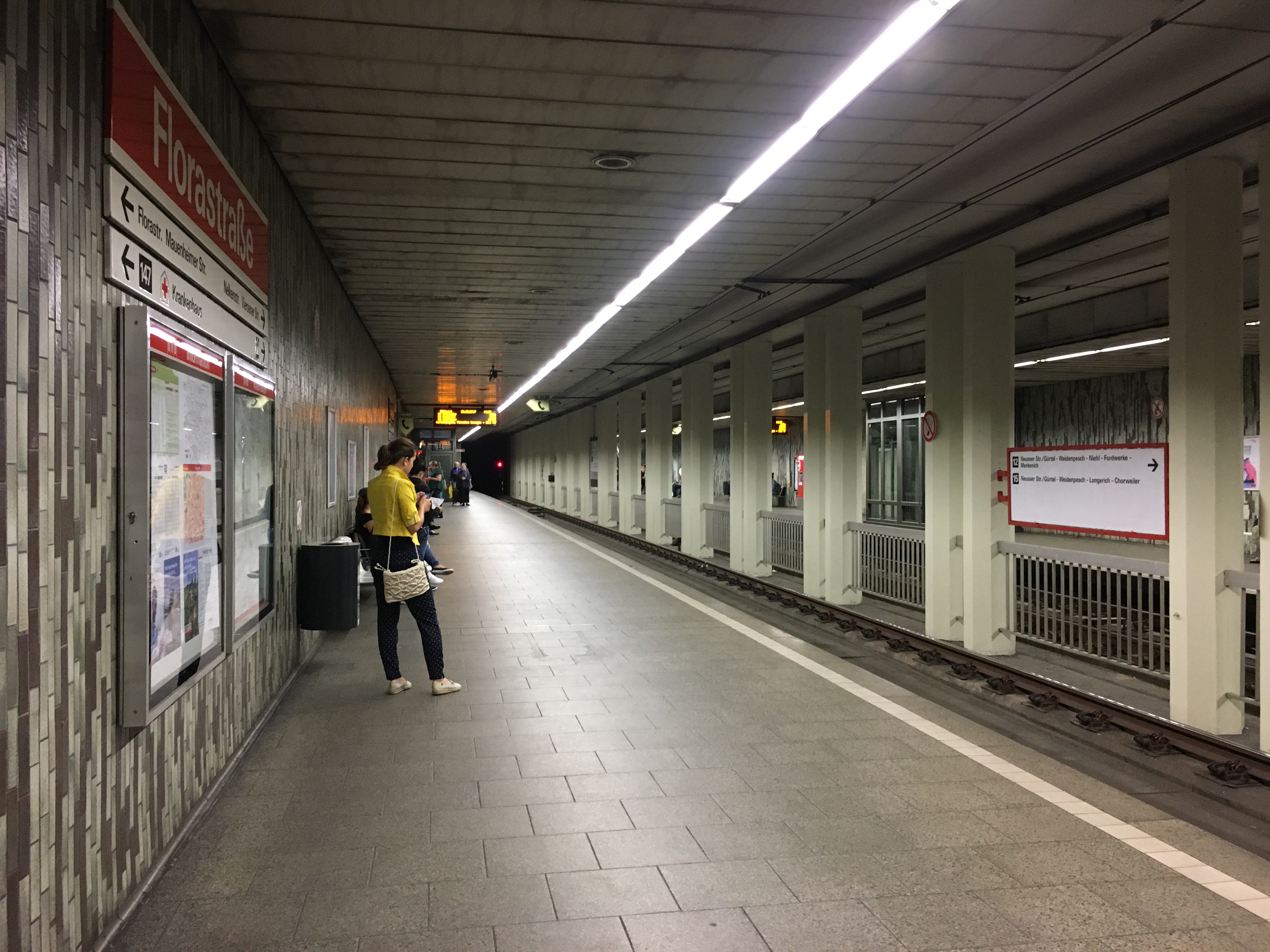
Florastraße station in 2017

Florastraße is a station on the Cologne Stadtbahn lines 12 and 15, located in the Cologne district of Nippes. The station lies on Neusser Straße, adjacent to nearby Florastraße, after which the station is named.

The station was opened and inaugurated in 1974 and it consists of two side platforms with two rail tracks.

== See also ==
- List of Cologne KVB stations

Preceding station	Cologne Stadtbahn	Following station
Neusser Straße/Gürtel towards Merkenich	Line 12	Lohsestraße towards Zollstock Südfriedhof
Neusser Straße/Gürtel towards Köln-Chorweiler or Longerich Friedhof	Line 15	Lohsestraße towards Ubierring
