= Amsterdamer Straße/Gürtel station =

Railway station in Germany

Coordinates: 50°58′14″N 6°58′9″E

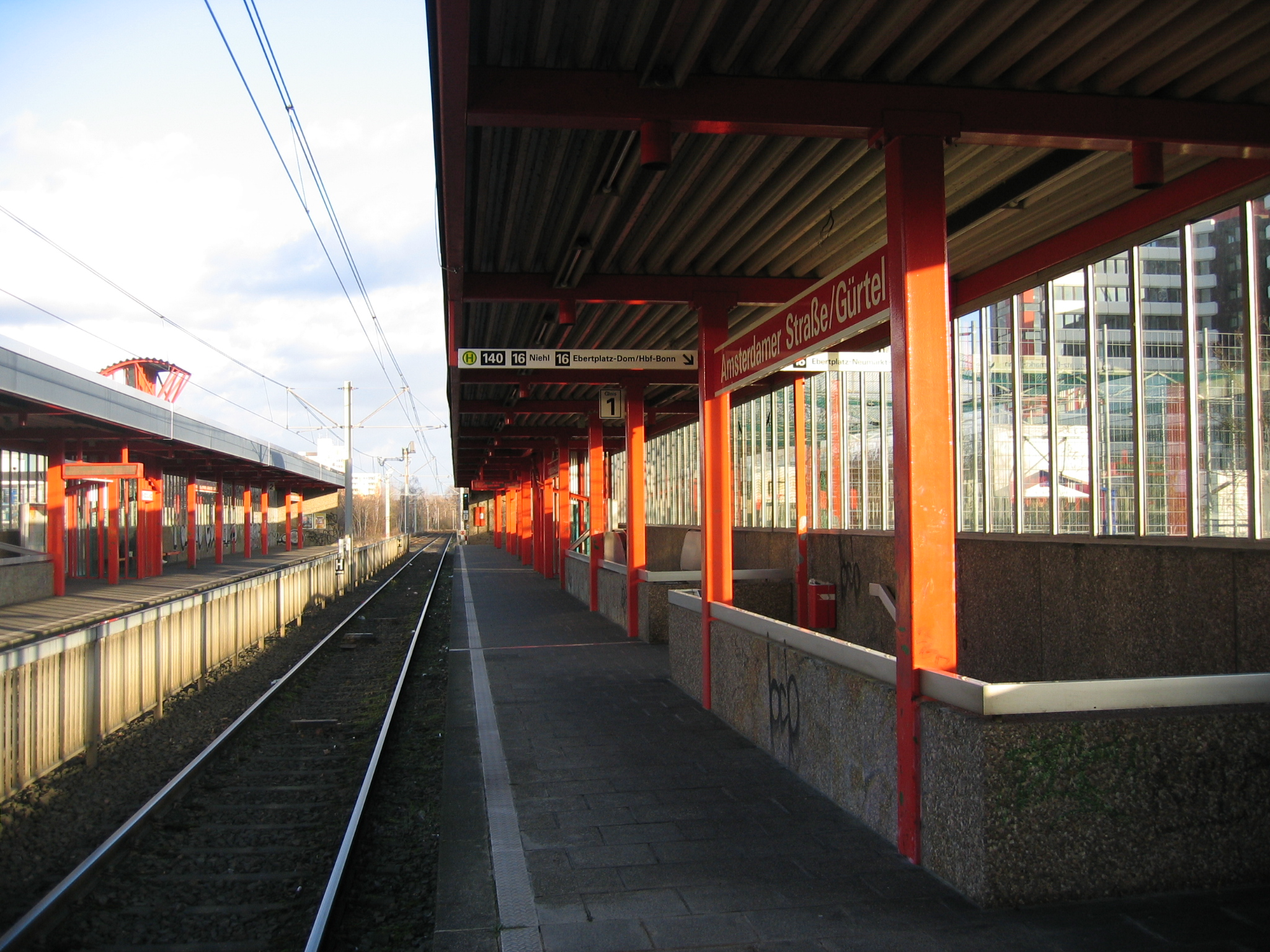
Elevated platforms of Amsterdamer Straße/Gürtel station in 2008

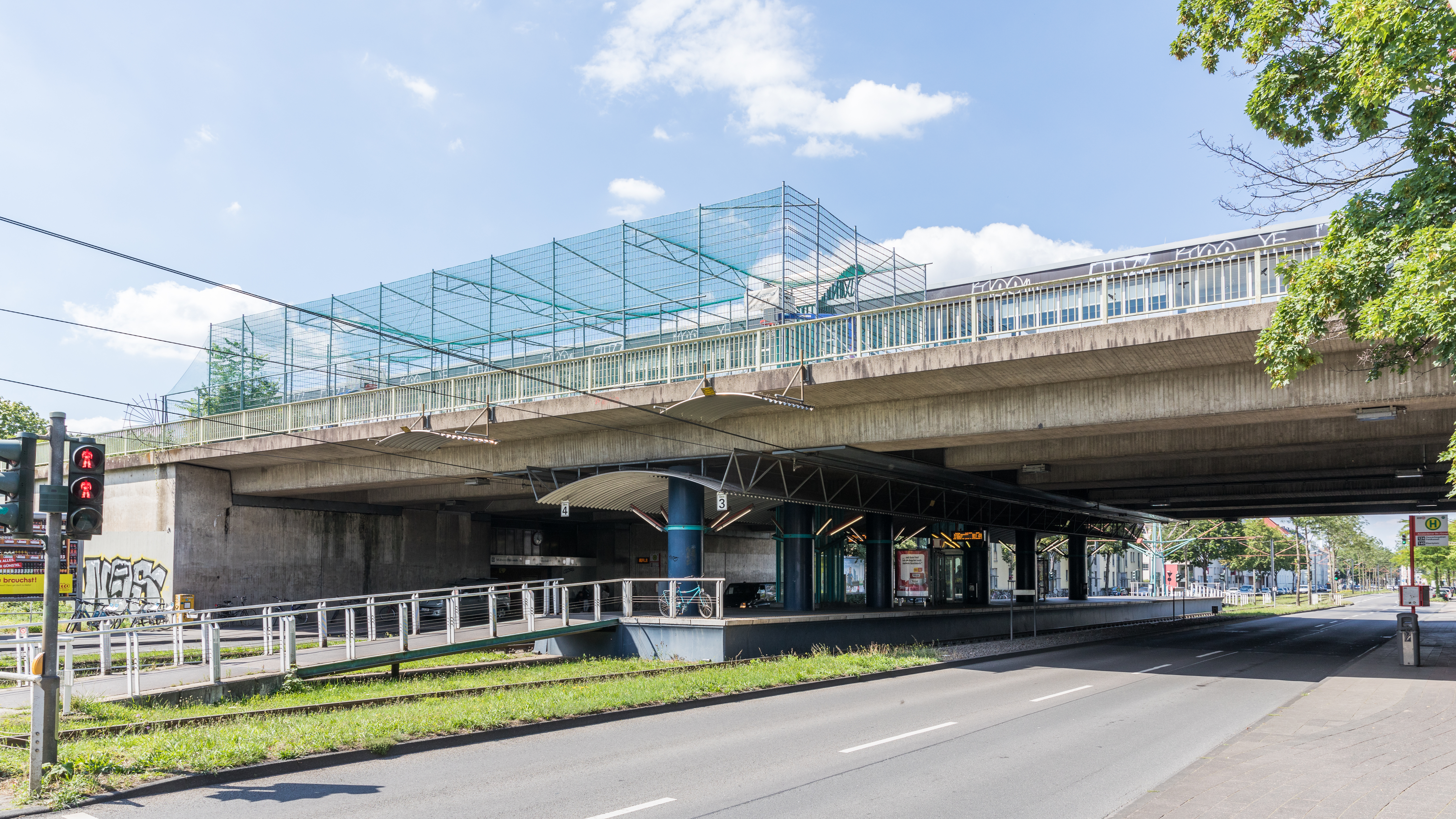
Complete view of the station: Platform on streetlevel and elevated platforms

Amsterdamer Straße/Gürtel is an interchange station on the Cologne Stadtbahn lines 13 and 16, located in the Cologne district of Nippes. The station lies on the junction of Amsterdamer Straße with the Cologne Belt (Gürtel), after which the station is named.

The station was opened in 1974 and consists of both an elevated and an at-grade station, each with two side platforms and two rail tracks.

== See also ==
- List of Cologne KVB stations

Preceding station	Cologne Stadtbahn	Following station
Neusser Straße/Gürtel towards Sülzgürtel	Line 13	Slabystraße towards Holweide Vischeringstraße
Kinderkrankenhaus towards Bad Godesberg Stadthalle	Line 16	Nesselrodestraße towards Niehl Sebastianstraße
