= Boltensternstraße station =

Railway station in Cologne, Germany

Coordinates: 50.96232°N 6.98081°E

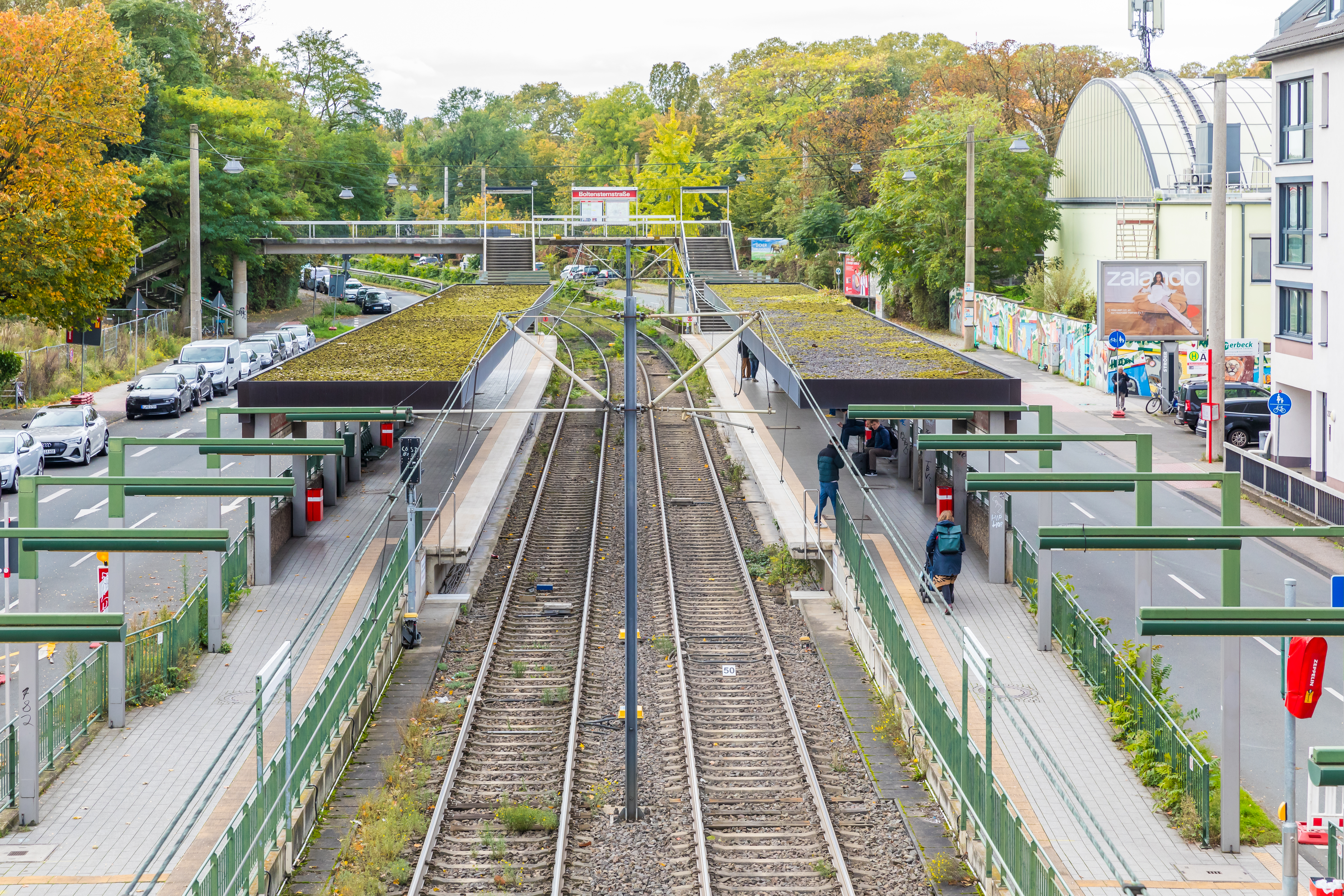
Boltensternstraße station in 2024

Boltensternstraße is a station on the Cologne Stadtbahn line 18, located in the Cologne district of Nippes. The station lies on Riehler Straße, adjacent to nearby Boltensternstraße, after which the station is named.

The station was opened in 1974 and consists of two side platforms with two rail tracks.

== See also ==
- List of Cologne KVB stations

Preceding station	Cologne Stadtbahn	Following station
Zoo/Flora towards Bonn Hbf	Line 18	Slabystraße towards Thielenbruch
