= Lohsestraße station =

Railway station in Cologne, Germany

Coordinates: 50°57′31″N 6°57′18″E

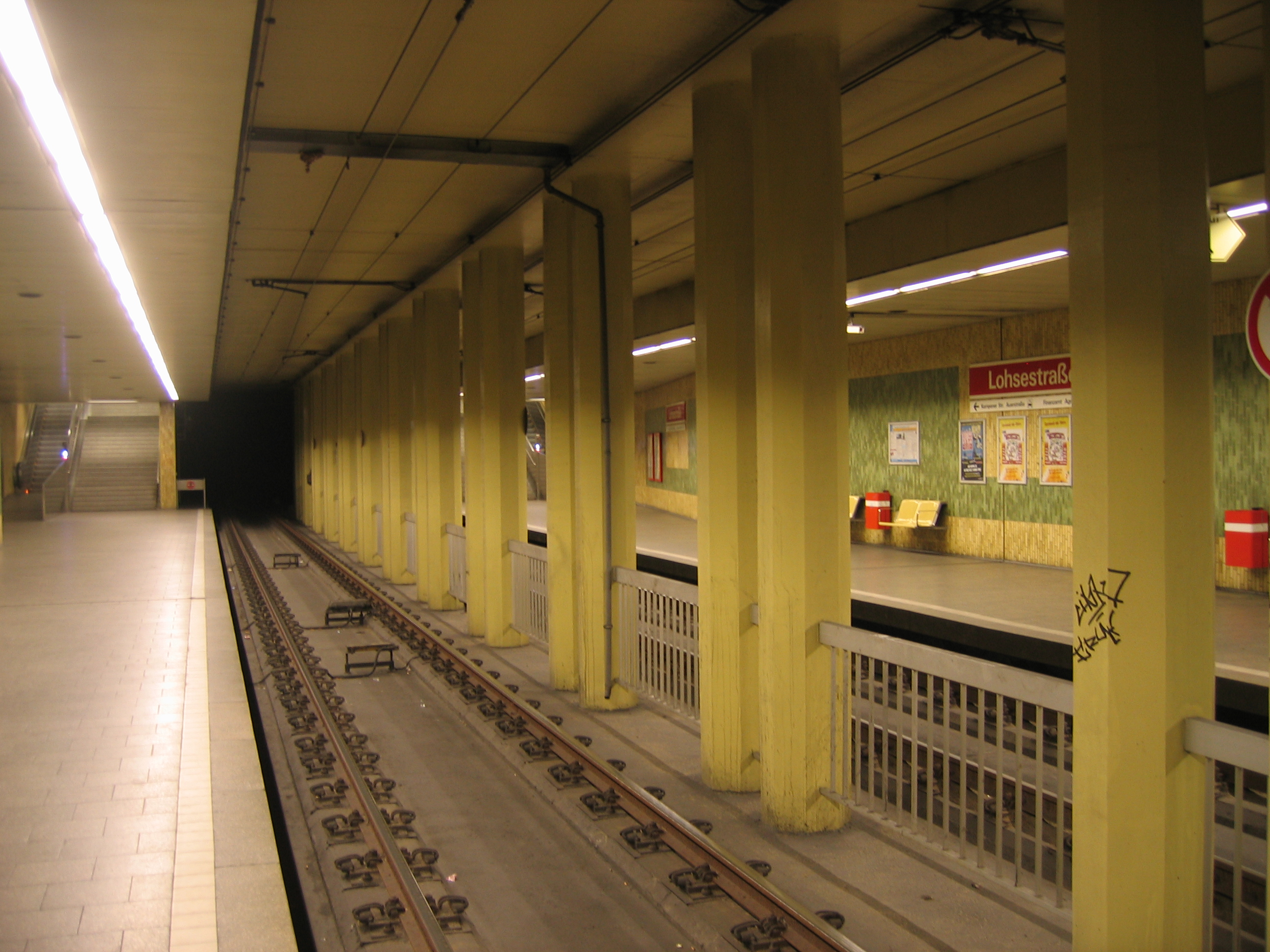
Lohsestraße station in 2008

Lohsestraße is a station on the Cologne Stadtbahn lines 12 and 15, located in the Cologne district of Nippes. The station lies on Neusser Straße, adjacent to nearby Lohsestraße, after which the station is named.

The station was opened in 1974 and consists of two side platforms with two rail tracks.

== See also ==
- List of Cologne KVB stations

Preceding station	Cologne Stadtbahn	Following station
Florastraße towards Merkenich	Line 12	Ebertplatz towards Zollstock Südfriedhof
Florastraße towards Köln-Chorweiler or Longerich Friedhof	Line 15	Ebertplatz towards Ubierring
