= Slabystraße station =

Railway station in Germany

Coordinates: 50°57′58″N 6°59′16″E

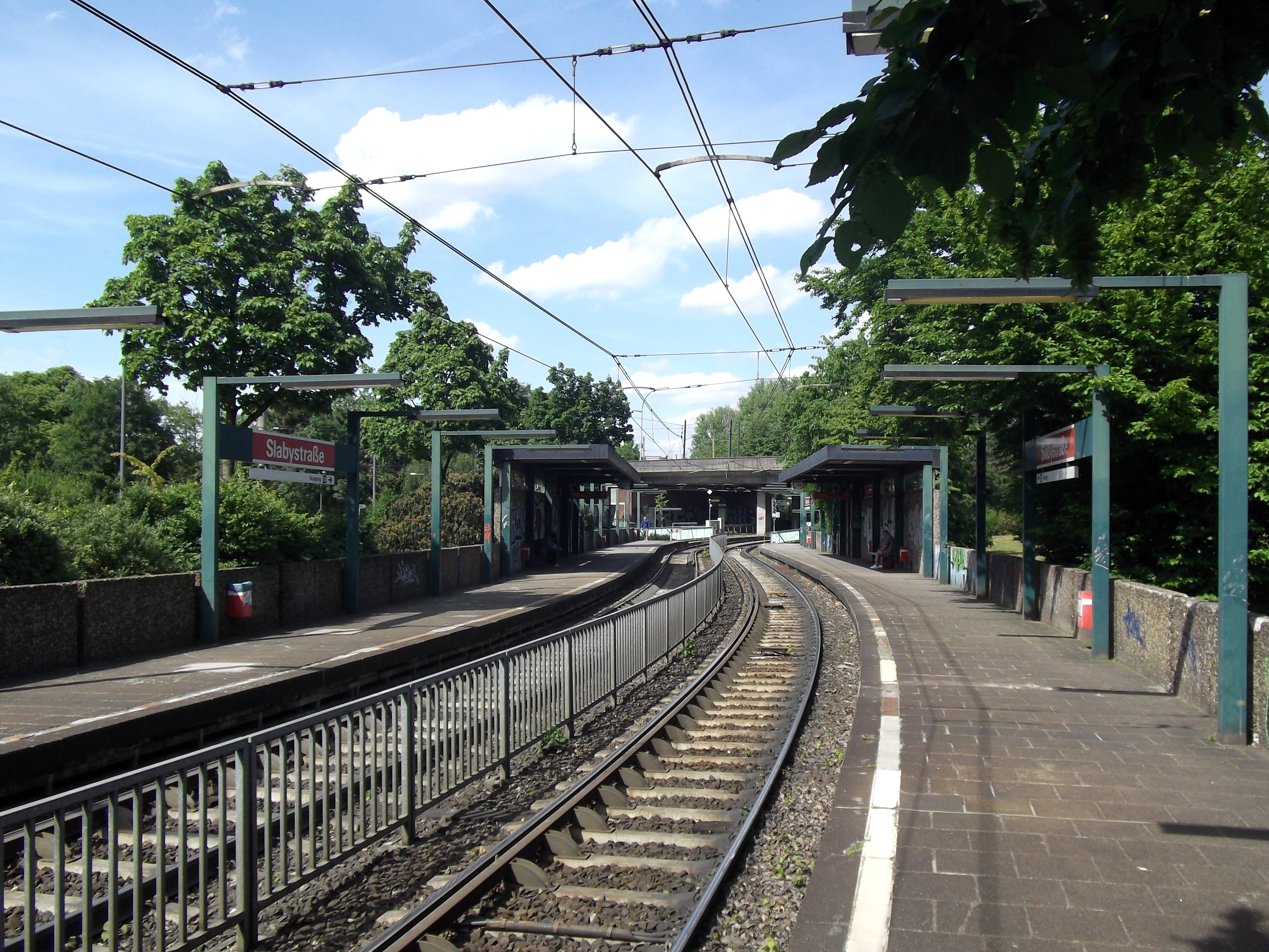
Slabystraße station in 2011

Slabystraße is an interchange station on the Cologne Stadtbahn lines 13 and 18, located in the Cologne district of Nippes. The station lies within the western feeder to the Cologne Mülheim Bridge.

The station was opened in 1974 and consists of four side platforms with four rail tracks.

== See also ==
- List of Cologne KVB stations

Preceding station	Cologne Stadtbahn	Following station
Amsterdamer Straße/Gürtel towards Sülzgürtel	Line 13	Wiener Platz towards Holweide Vischeringstraße
Boltensternstraße towards Bonn Hbf	Line 18	Wiener Platz towards Thielenbruch
