= Forstbotanischer Garten Köln =

Botanical garden in Germany

Coordinates: 50°53′06″N 6°58′46″E

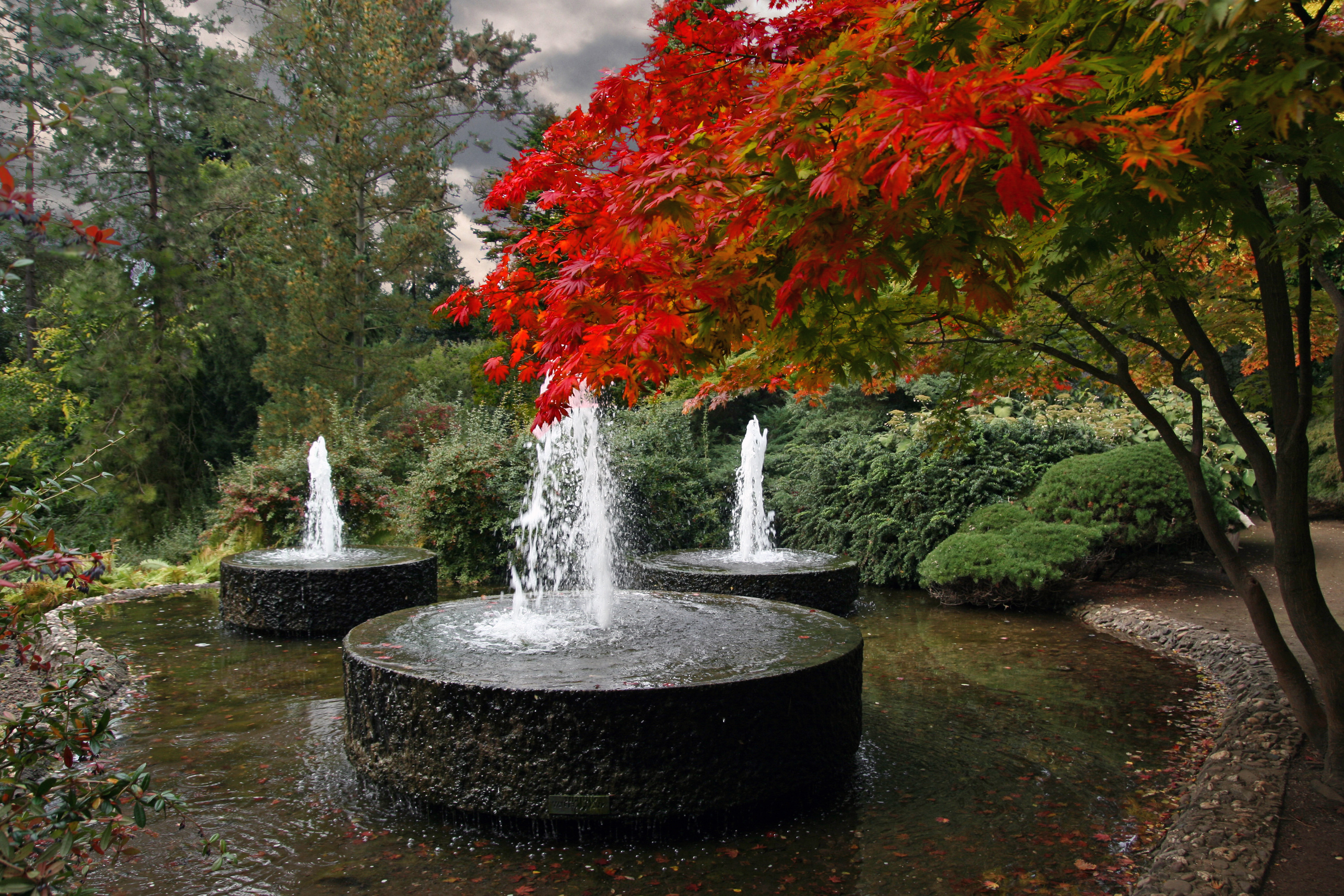
Forstbotanischer Garten Köln

The Forstbotanischer Garten Köln (25 hectares) is an arboretum and woodland botanical garden located at Schillingsrotterstraße 100, Rodenkirchen, Cologne, North Rhine-Westphalia, Germany. It forms part of the city's outer green belt and is open daily without charge.

The garden was created between 1962–1964 on a former military site which was, until the end of World War I, a part of the Äußerer Festungsring Köln, the outer ring of fortresses surrounding Cologne. Its ruins have been integrated into the plantings as a rock garden. In the 1980s, an adjoining natural area was created as the Friedenswald with additional tree plantings.

Today the garden contains exotic and native trees. Of particular interest are the Rhododendron ravine, heather garden, peonies (Paeonia), Japanese plantings (including Acer palmatum, Cercidiphyllum, and Bambusoideae), and North American plantings (1.5 hectares, including Sequoiadendron giganteum, Pinus ponderosa, and Abies concolor). The Friedenswald (20 hectares) contains a large meadow surrounded by deciduous and coniferous forests containing trees and shrubs from all nations with which Germany has diplomatic relations; tropical and subtropical species are represented by symbolic trees.

== See also ==
- Flora und Botanischer Garten Köln
- List of botanical gardens in Germany
