= Stegerwaldsiedlung station =

Railway station in Cologne, Germany

Coordinates: 50°56′53″N 6°59′34″E

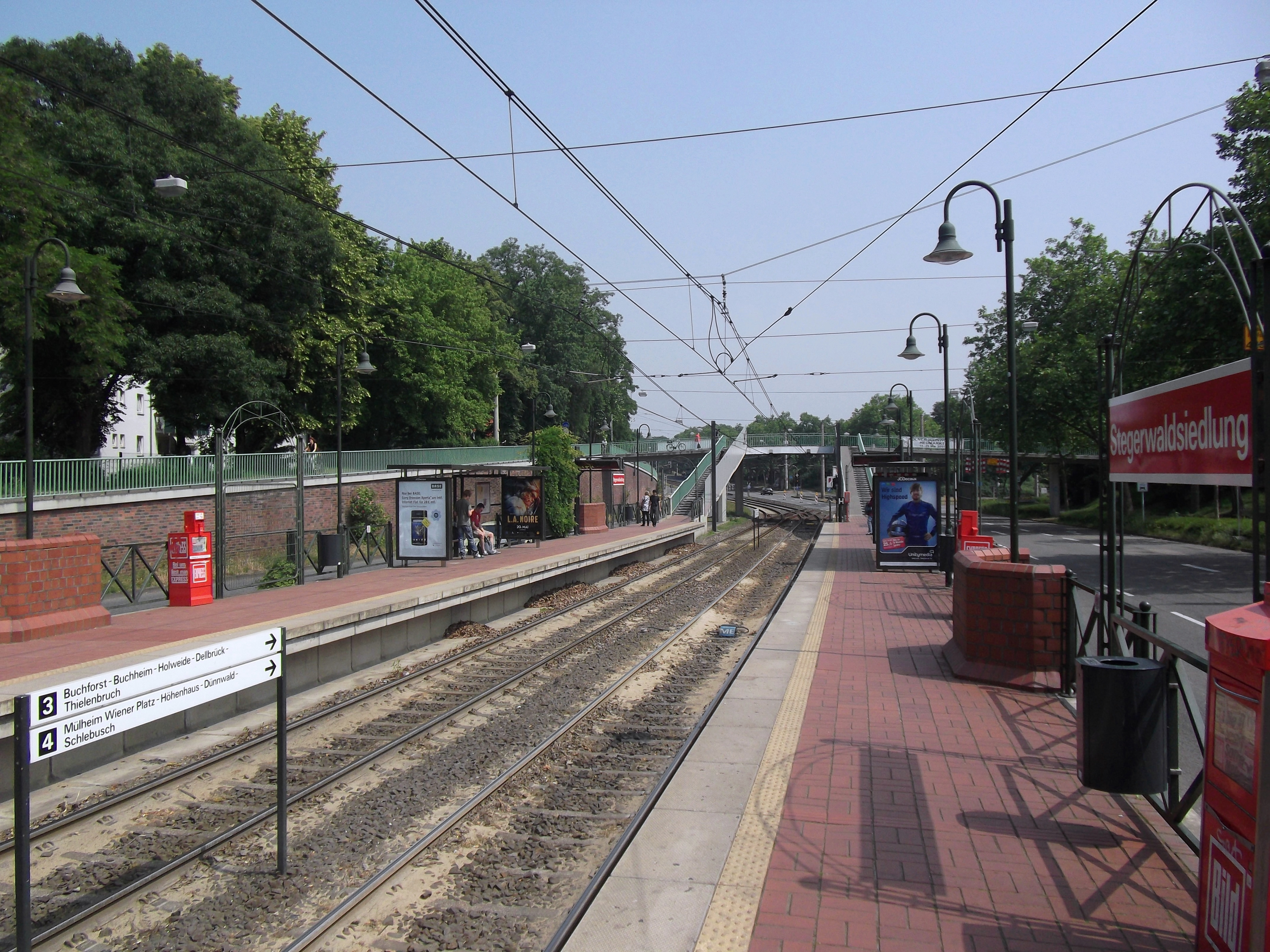
KVB Stegerwaldsiedlung

Stegerwaldsiedlung is a station on the Cologne Stadtbahn lines 3 and 4, located in the Cologne district of Mülheim.

== See also ==
- List of Cologne KVB stations

Preceding station	Cologne Stadtbahn	Following station
Koelnmesse towards Görlinger-Zentrum	Line 3	Buchforst Waldecker Straße towards Thielenbruch
Koelnmesse towards Bocklemünd	Line 4	Grünstraße towards Schlebusch
