= Wiener Platz station =

Railway station in Cologne, Germany

Wiener Platz
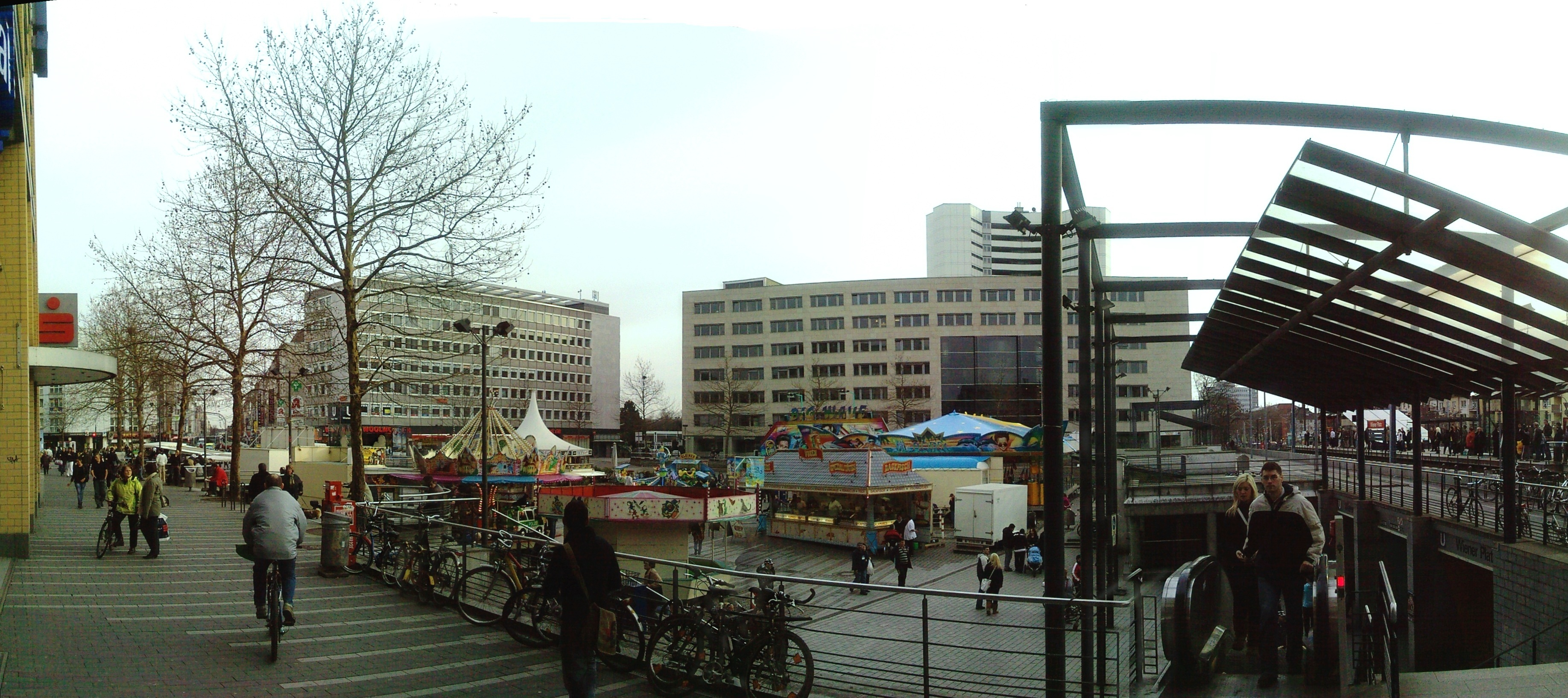
- Wiener Platz station entrance (right)

General information
- Location: Wiener Platz, 51065 Köln
- Coordinates: 50°57′42″N 7°0′15″E
- Owner: Kölner Verkehrs-Betriebe
- Platforms: 2 island platforms
- Connections: Bus, Taxi

Construction
- Structure type: Underground; At grade
- Cycle facilities: Call a bike
- Accessible: Yes

Other information
- Fare zone: VRS: 2100

History
- Opened: 1. June 1997

Services
Preceding station	Cologne Stadtbahn	Following station
Grünstraße towards Bocklemünd	Line 4	Keupstraße towards Schlebusch
Slabystraße towards Sülzgürtel	Line 13	Köln-Mülheim towards Holweide Vischeringstraße
Slabystraße towards Bonn Hbf	Line 18	Köln-Mülheim towards Thielenbruch
Route map
Location

Wiener Platz is an interchange station and hub on the Cologne Stadtbahn lines 4, 13 and 18 in the Cologne district of Mülheim. The station is located at Wiener Platz, the center of Mülheim.

The station consists of an at-grade station for line 4 and an underground station for line 13 and 18. The underground station was opened in 1997.

== Services ==
Transport service is provided by Stadtbahn trains and interconnecting bus lines.

== Notable places nearby ==
- St. Clemens and Friedenskirche
- Stadtgarten and Stadthaus
- Frankfurter Straße shopping district

== See also ==
- List of Cologne KVB stations
