= Keupstraße station =

Railway station in Cologne, Germany

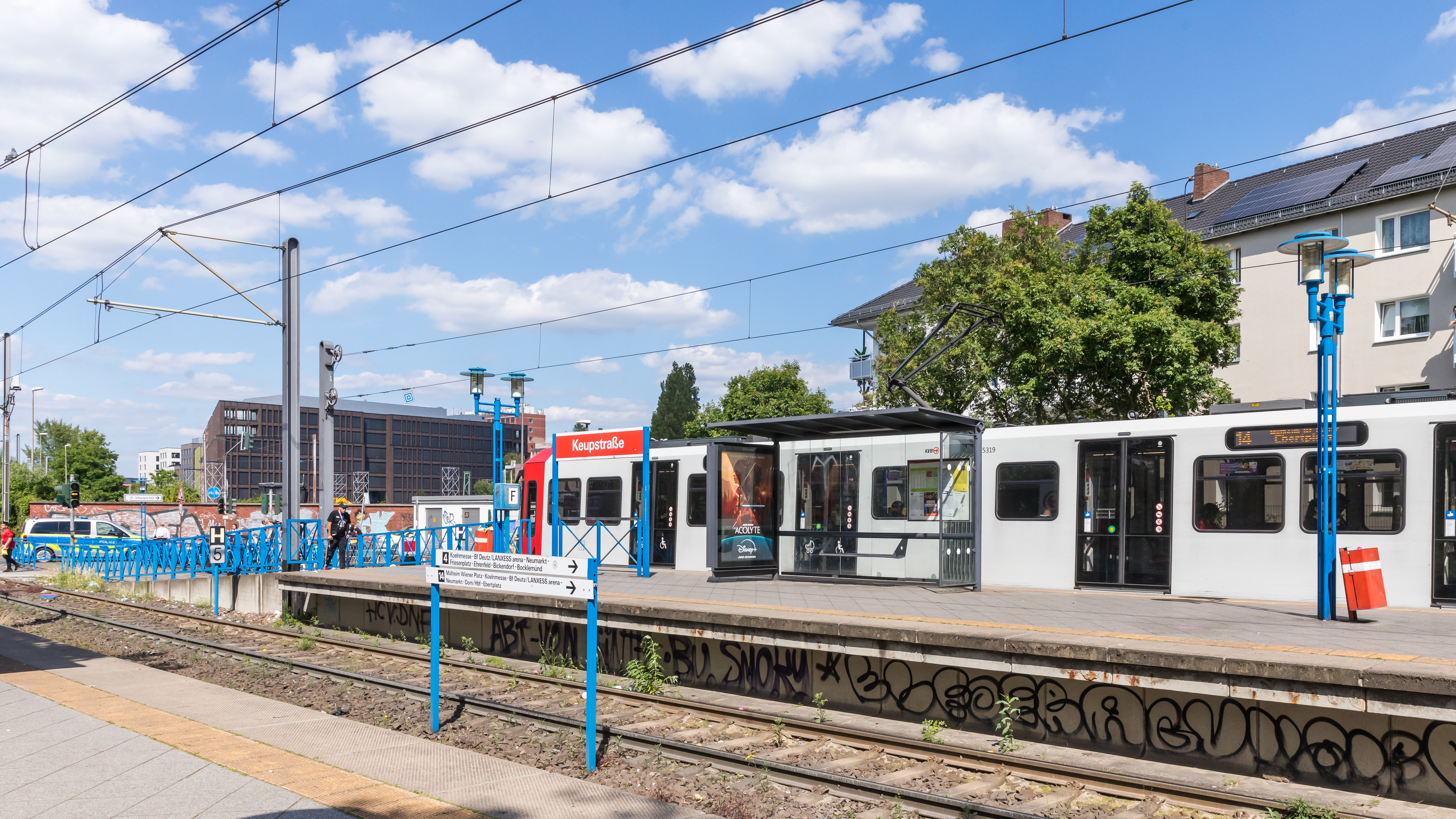
Keupstraße station

Keupstraße is a station on line 4 of the Cologne Stadtbahn.

== See also ==
- List of Cologne KVB stations

Preceding station	Cologne Stadtbahn	Following station
Wiener Platz towards Bocklemünd	Line 4	Dünnwalder Straße towards Schlebusch
