= Koelnmesse station =

Railway station in Cologne, Germany

Koelnmesse
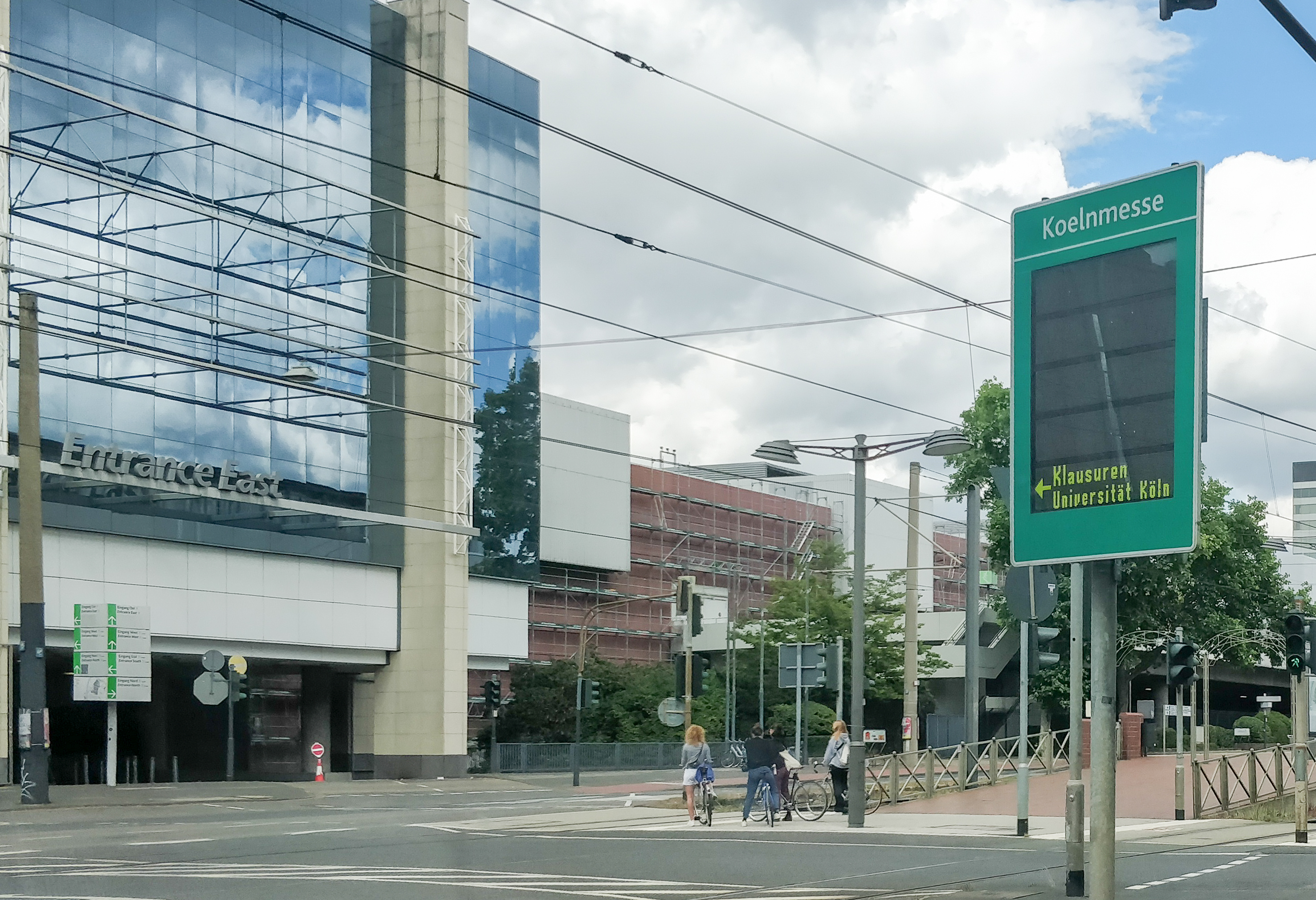
- Entrance to Koelnmesse station (right) in front of a Koelnmesse exhibit hall

General information
- Location: Cologne Trade Fair; Cologne; Germany
- Coordinates: 50°56′37″N 6°58′55″E
- Owner: Kölner Verkehrs-Betriebe (KVB)
- Platforms: 1 island platform
- Tracks: 2

Construction
- Structure type: At grade
- Accessible: Yes

Services
Preceding station	Cologne Stadtbahn	Following station
Köln Messe/Deutz towards Görlinger-Zentrum	Line 3	Stegerwaldsiedlung towards Thielenbruch
Köln Messe/Deutz towards Bocklemünd	Line 4	Stegerwaldsiedlung towards Schlebusch
Location

Koelnmesse station is an at-grade Cologne Stadtbahn station in the district of Deutz, in Cologne, Germany. The station is adjacent to the Cologne Trade Fair (German: Koelnmesse).
