= Grünstraße station =

Railway station in Cologne, Germany

Coordinates: 50°57′20″N 7°00′01″E

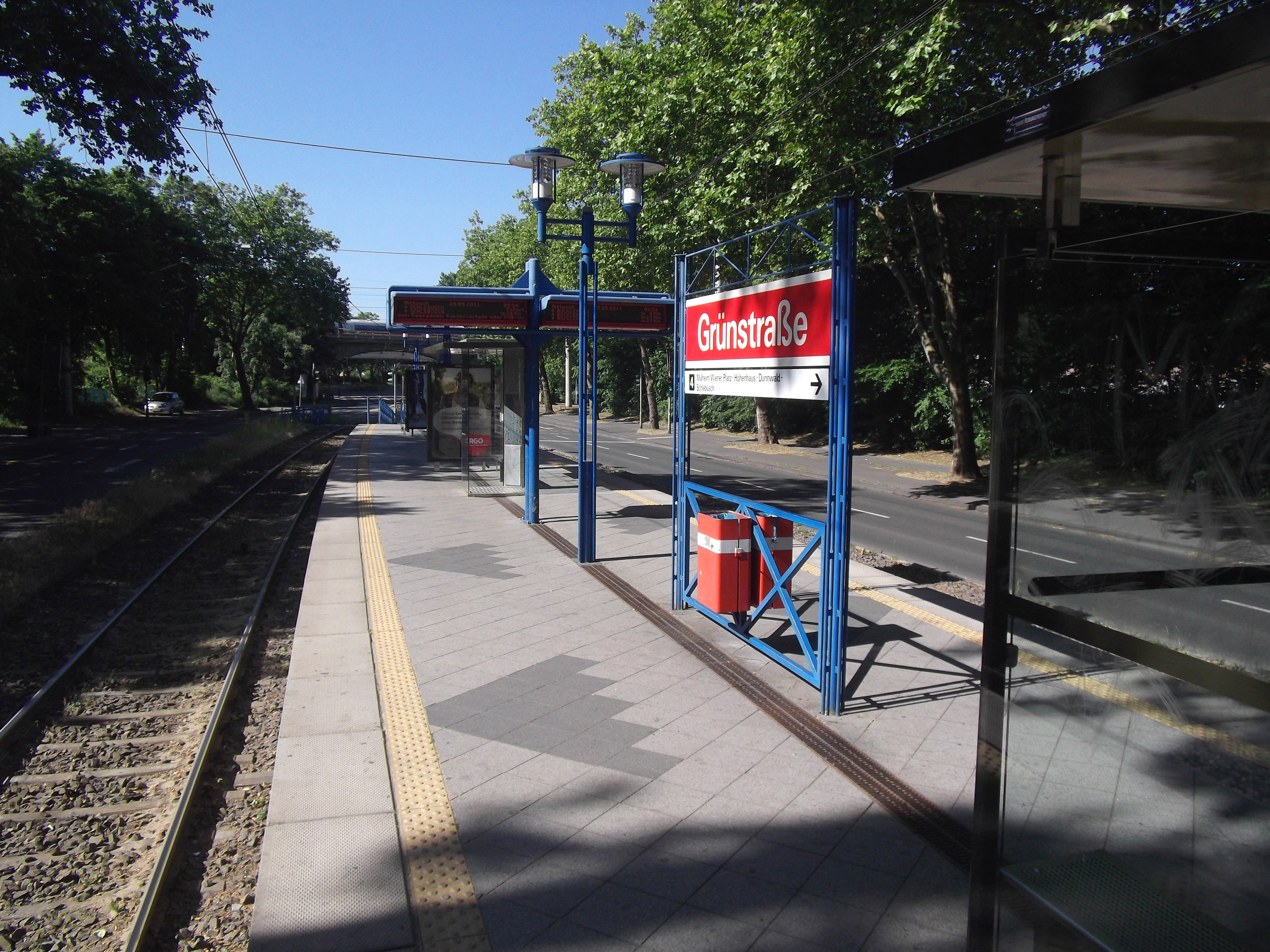
KVB Grünstraße

Grünstraße is a station on the Cologne Stadtbahn line 4, located in the Cologne district of Mülheim.

== See also ==
- List of Cologne KVB stations

Preceding station	Cologne Stadtbahn	Following station
Stegerwaldsiedlung towards Bocklemünd	Line 4	Wiener Platz towards Schlebusch
