= Rheinpark =

Park in Cologne, Germany

Coordinates: 50°56′57″N 6°58′32″E

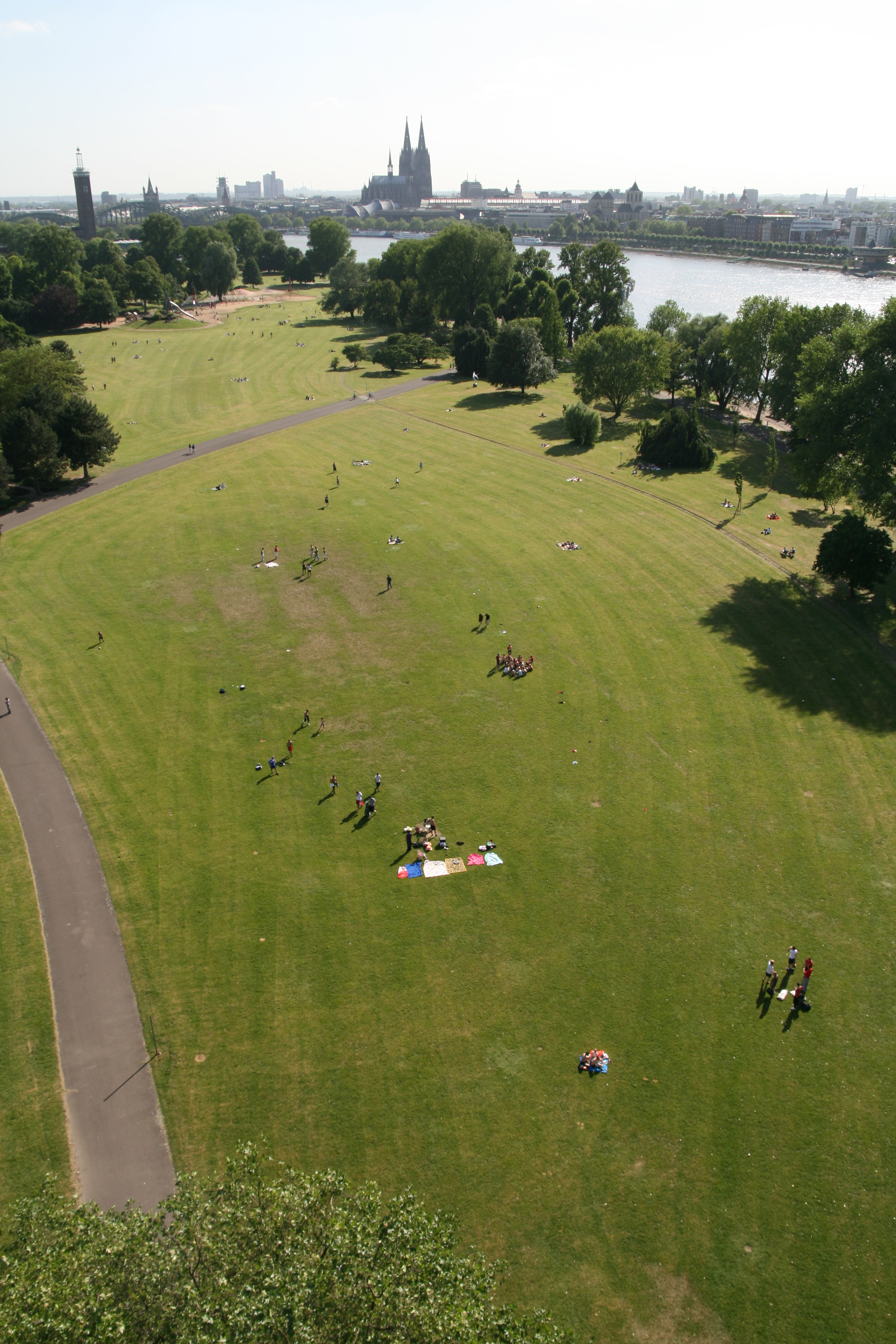
View from the North-East, off the Cologne Cable Car; visible are Messeturm Köln (top left) and Cologne Cathedral (center)

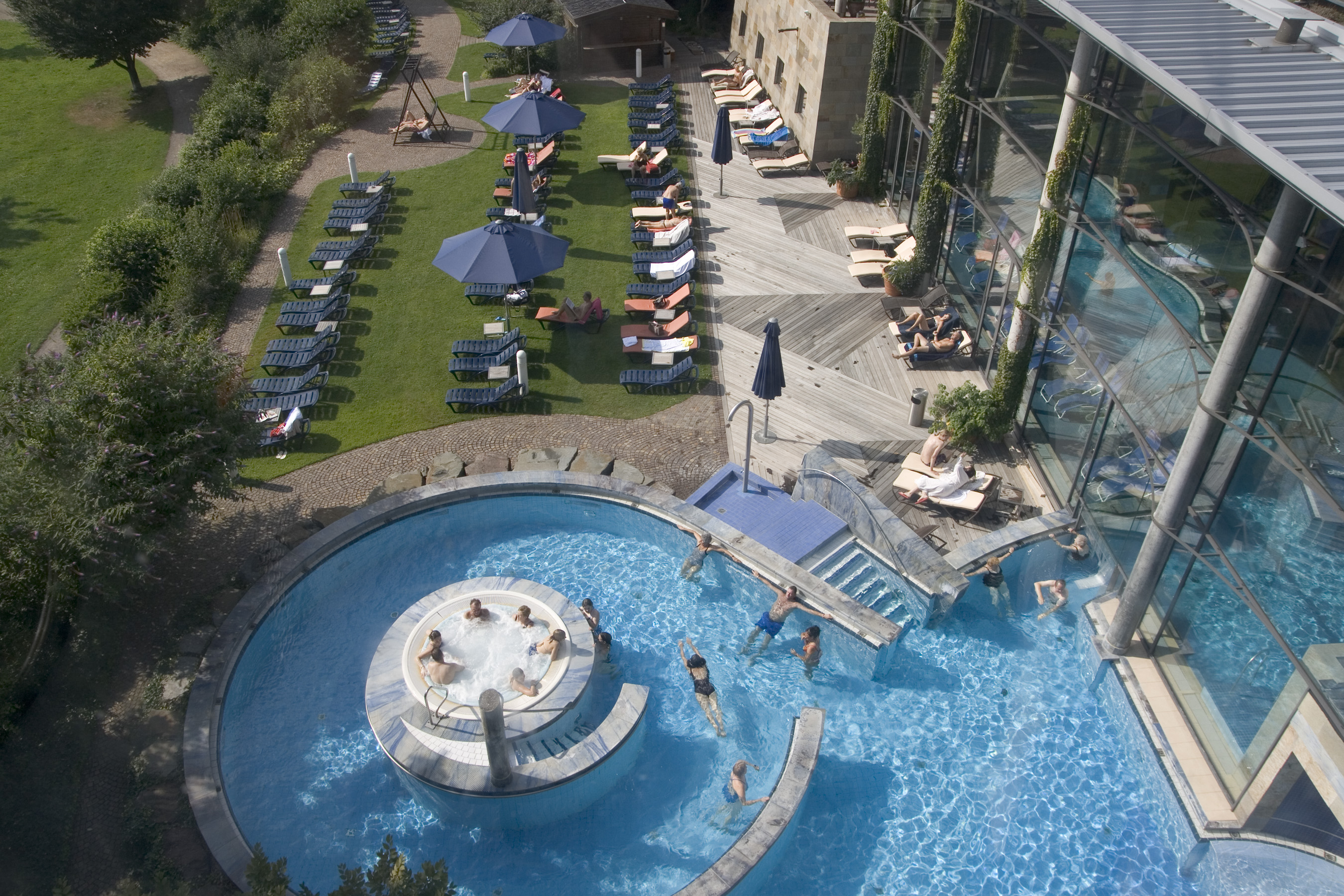
Claudius Therme

The Rheinpark (meaning: Rhine park) is a 40 hectare (0,4 km²) large urban park along the right bank of the river Rhine in Cologne, Germany. The park lies between the Cologne districts of Deutz and Mülheim and includes a beach club, an open-air theater (the Tanzbrunnen) and a Roman Thermae styled public bath (the Claudius-Therme). It was voted Germany's best park in 2007.

== History ==
Originally laid out according to plans by landscape architect Fritz Encke and opened in 1913, the park today mirrors the redesign of the park for the Bundesgartenschau in 1957.

Major public events in the history of the park were:

- Cologne Werkbund Exhibition, 1914
- Internationale Presse-Ausstellung 1928
- Bundesgartenschau 1957
- Bundesgartenschau 1971

== Venues ==
- Tanzbrunnen Theater
