= Cologne Zoological Garden =

Zoo in Germany

Cologne Zoological Garden Zoologischer Garten Köln

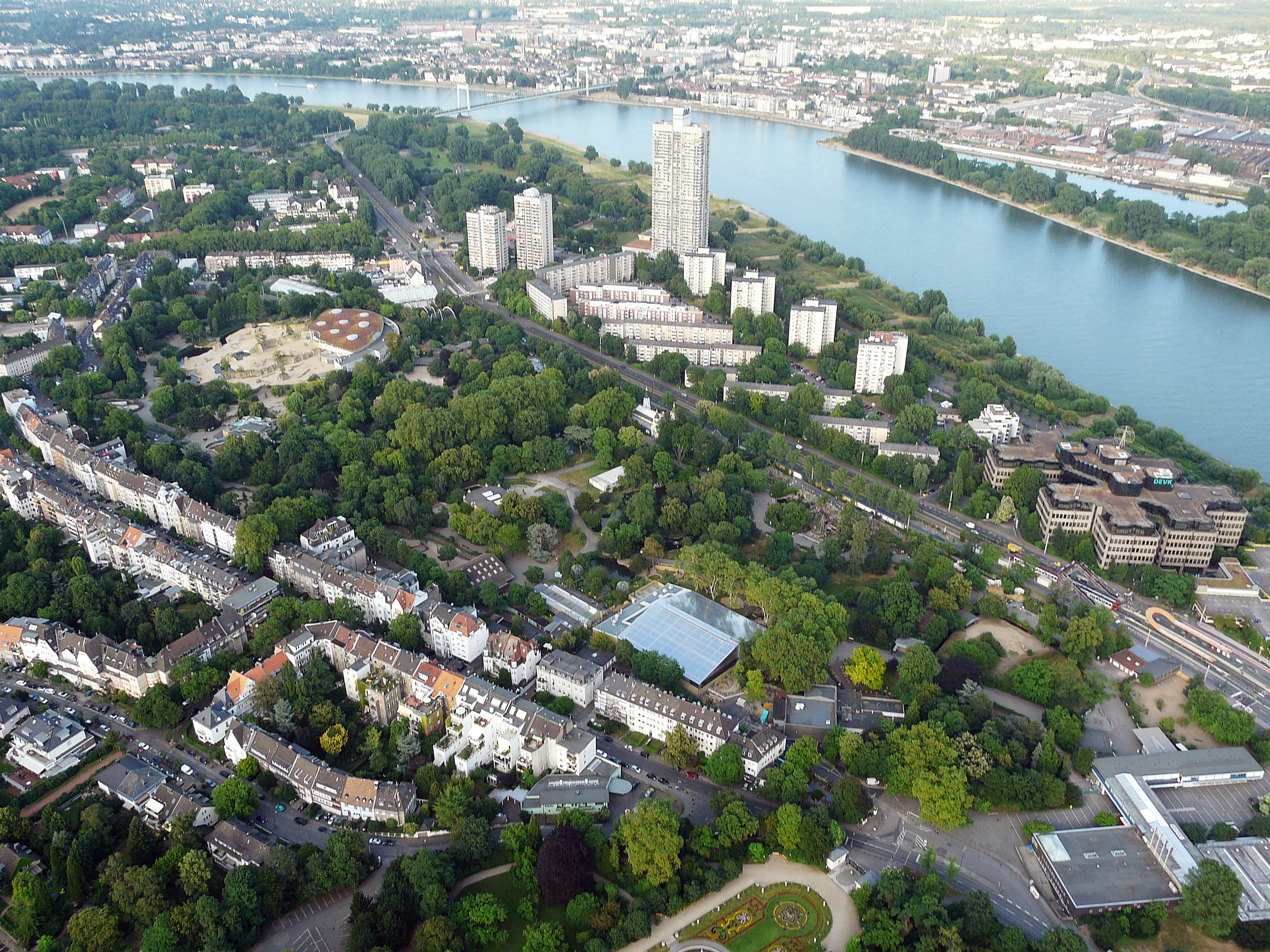
- Aerial view
- Interactive map of Cologne Zoological Garden; Zoologischer Garten Köln
- 50°57′30″N 06°58′24″E
- Date opened: 1860
- Location: Cologne, North Rhine-Westphalia, Germany
- Land area: 20 hectares (49 acres)
- No. of species: 700+
- Memberships: EAZA, WAZA
- Public transit: 18 Zoo/Flora
- Website: koelnerzoo.de/en/

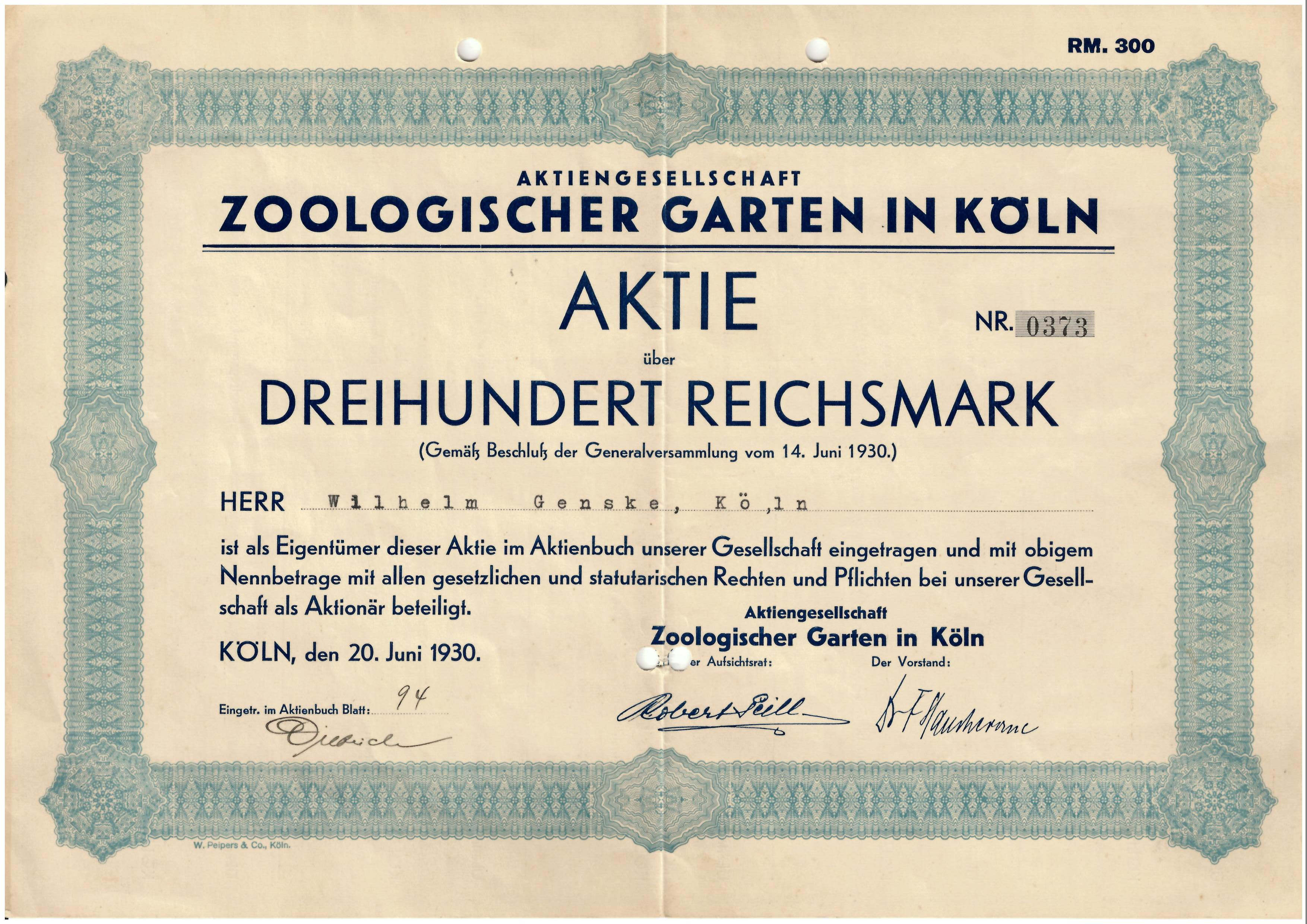
Share of the Cologne Zoological Garden, issued 20. June 1930

The Aktiengesellschaft Cologne Zoological Garden is the zoo of Cologne, Germany. Being the third oldest zoo in Germany, it features over 10,000 animals of more than 850 species on more than 20 hectares. The internationally renowned zoo with an attached aquarium and invertebrate exhibit is active in preservational breeding of animals that are in danger of becoming extinct. In addition, in-the-wild conservation efforts and research focussing on animals of Madagascar, Wallacea, and Vietnam are actively promoted and supported via cooperation with Cologne University and local projects, such as in the case of Przewalski's horses and the Psychedelic rock gecko captive breeding project.

== History ==
The zoo was founded in 1860 by a shareholding company organized by local citizens, with biologist Heinrich Bodinus appointed as the first director (who would later become a director of the Berlin Zoological Garden). The animal enclosures being built at the time were recognized by their ornate, detailed building designs, with the most notable being the elephant house (designed to resemble a Moorish temple), the bird house (designed to resemble a Russian cathedral), the sea lion pool, and the cattle and ox houses (designed to resemble Swiss log cabins). Carl Hagenbeck's enclosure design also influenced the layout of the zoo, as interpreted by naturalistic looking baboon and polar bear rockwork exhibits built around 1914.

Initially, the zoo's financial track was a successful start, but the World Wars in Germany resulted in phases of stagnation. World War I and the Great Depression resulted in economic losses and development slowdown, and many animals suffered from a lack of food supply. Shortly after World War II the zoo had to close for two years entirely, after being heavily destroyed.

After reopening in 1947, the zoo saw a wave of modernization and renovation of its old exhibits. In 1960, the existing area expanded from 11 to 18.8 hectares and the first education center in a European zoo three years later. From 1981 to 2012, several new exhibits considered revolutionary were constructed including a great ape tropical house (1985), Southeast Asian rainforest house (2000), open-air Asian elephant enclosure, and West African-themed hippo and crocodile house (2010), as well the development of a Friends of the Zoo Organization (Freunde des Kölner Zoos e. V.) in 1982 and the launch of the first European Endangered Species Programme in 1985.

== Notable exhibits ==
Cologne Zoological Garden (video)

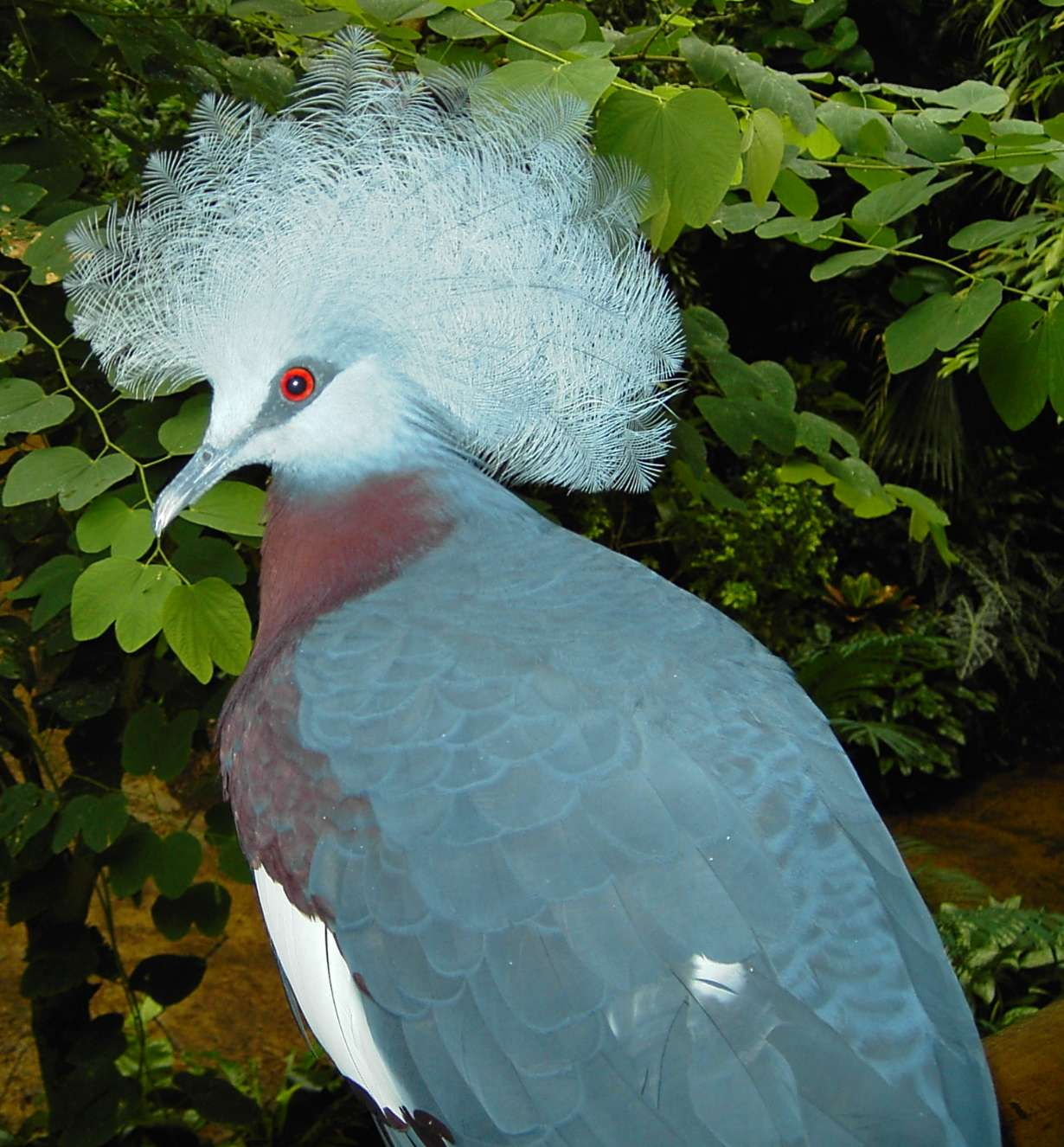
Southern crowned pigeon in the zoo

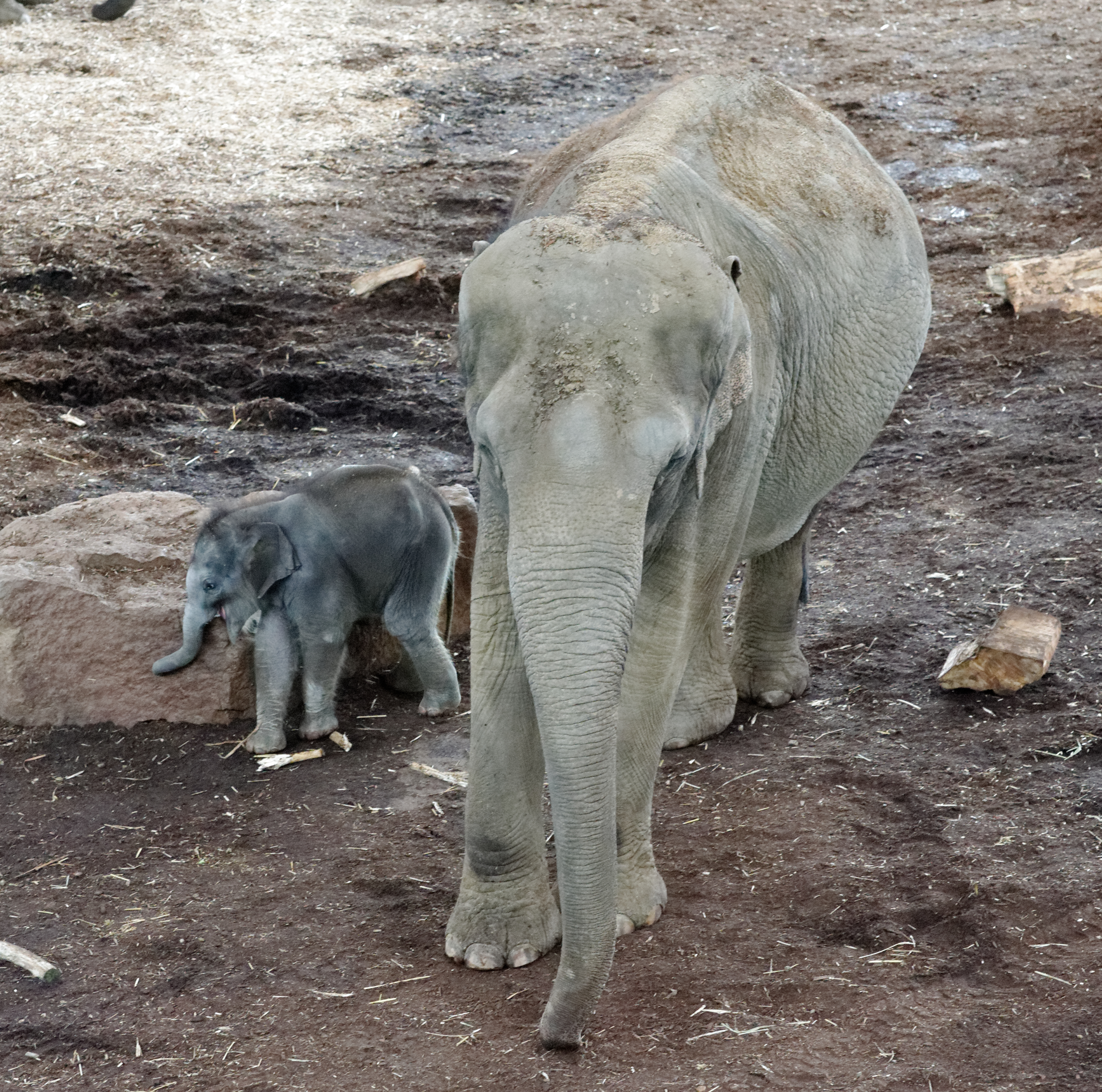
Mother Marlar and Moma born 2017

=== Primates ===
The great ape jungle house (Urwaldhaus) opened in 1985 as one of the first immersion exhibits in Europe. The enclosures mainly consist of swinging ropes, climbing bars, and various tropical plants to provide enrichment for the animals. Species housed include western lowland gorillas, orangutans, bonobos, pygmy marmosets, king colobus, and lion-tailed macaques.

The baboon rock, which opened in 1914, houses a troop of hamadryas baboons. The enclosure is a rocky island surrounded by a deep moat. The daily feeding of the baboons is very popular with visitors.

The bird house which was built at the time of the zoo's founding now houses South American monkey species including red howlers and golden lion tamarins.

=== Rainforest Hall ===
Opened in 2000, this building houses animals native to the rainforests of Southeast Asia. The free-flight aviary in the exhibit includes palm cockatoos, blue-faced honeyeaters, Bali mynahs, fairy bluebirds, wrinkled hornbills, Black-naped fruit doves, Palawan peacock-pheasants, green peafowl, sailfin lizards, Southern crowned pigeons, and reticulated pythons. Other animals include Asian small-clawed otters, northern Luzon giant cloud rats, and lar gibbons.

=== Pachyderms ===
The new Asian elephant park opened in 2004 to replace the old elephant and antelope house. Since its inception, the zoo has had successes in elephant breeding, with the latest calf being born in 2023.

The hippo and crocodile house Hippodom, which opened in 2010, has common hippopotamuses, sitatunga antelopes, and Nile crocodiles as the main attractions. Other species housed include aardvarks, Rodrigues' flying foxes, hamerkops, hadada ibises, cattle egrets, and grey parrots.

=== Aquarium ===
Opened in 1971, the aquarium is located outside the main zoo grounds and is home to the majority of the zoo's amphibian, reptile, fish, and invertebrate collection. The most notable features include an insectarium, a coral reef tank, a Lake Tanganyika cichlid tank, a Philippine crocodile exhibit, and a Rhine panorama tank with various native fish.

== Incidents ==
In 1969, the zoo sought to acquire two young mountain gorillas, Coco and Pucker, from Rwanda. The capture of these gorillas caused the deaths of 20 adult gorillas, who tried to defend them. Dian Fossey tried unsuccessfully to prevent the export. They later died in 1978.

On October 10, 1985, male chimp Petermann and female chimp Susi escaped from their cage. They knocked down a zookeeper and attacked director Dr. Gunther Nogge, lifethreateningly injuring him by biting his head and his face. Subsequently, both were shot by the police; Petermann within the area of the zoo, Susi nearby, in the basement of a neighbouring house.

On March 6, 2012, a cheetah escaped its enclosure by jumping out of it. After strolling around the flamingo lake for 20 minutes, it returned to its enclosure by itself.

On May 25, 2012, the female Asian elephant Chumpol, who was imported from Thailand, was killed while in a socialization conflict with other members of the existing elephant herd.

On August 25, 2012, the Siberian tiger Altai attacked his zookeeper and fatally injured her. The animal had entered through an open security lock into a covered part of his enclosure, which the zookeeper was cleaning. The cat was shot by director Theo Pagel with a rifle to allow rescue workers access to the carer.

On March 15, 2022, a fire broke out in the Southeast Asian rainforest house, killing at least 130 animals.

== Transportations ==
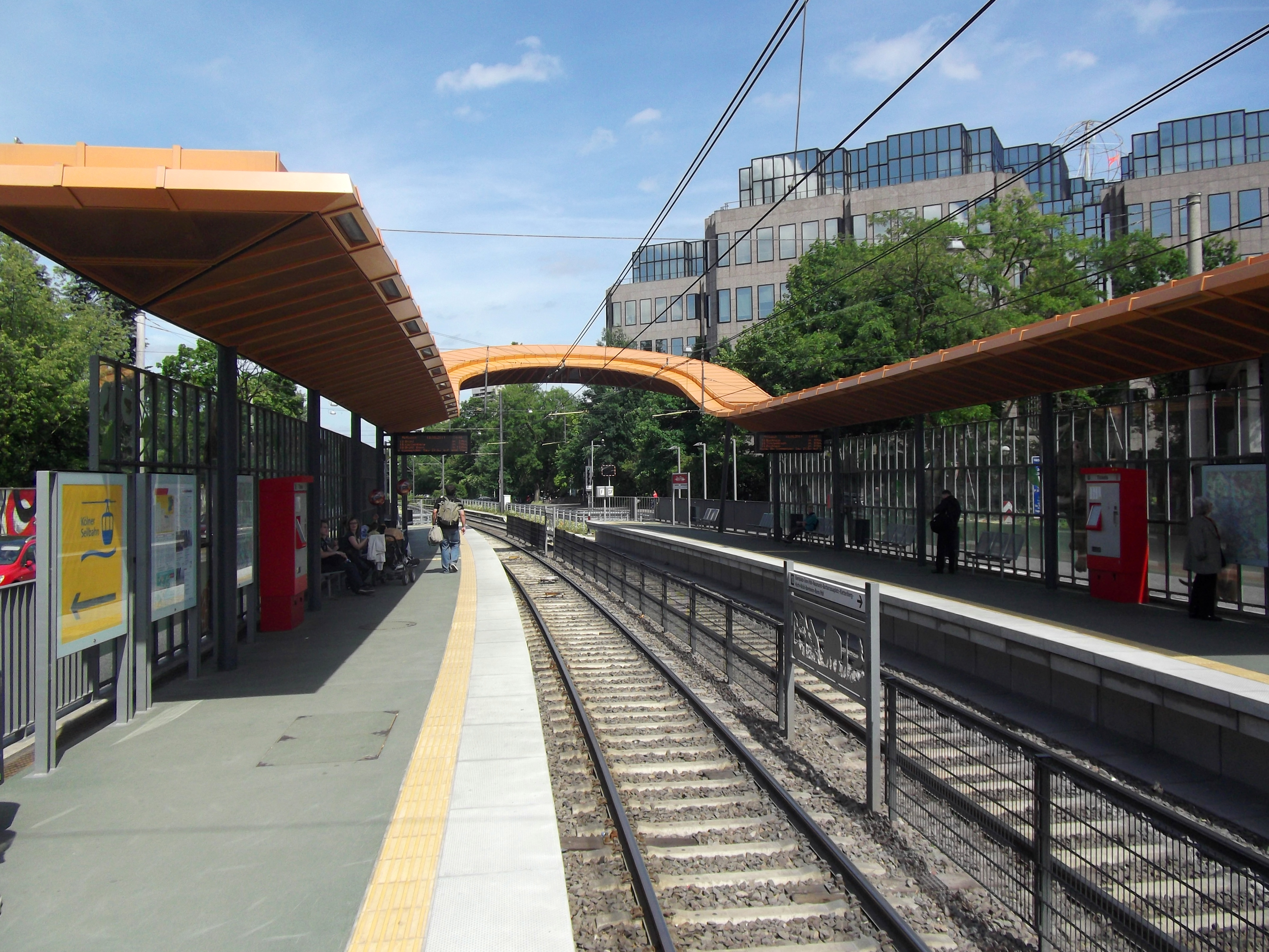
KVB stop Zoo/Flora

Close to the Zoo the KVB lightrail stop "Zoo/Flora" of line 18 is located.
