= Flora Botanical Garden =

Municipal formal park and botanical garden in Germany

Coordinates: 50°57′40″N 6°58′15″E

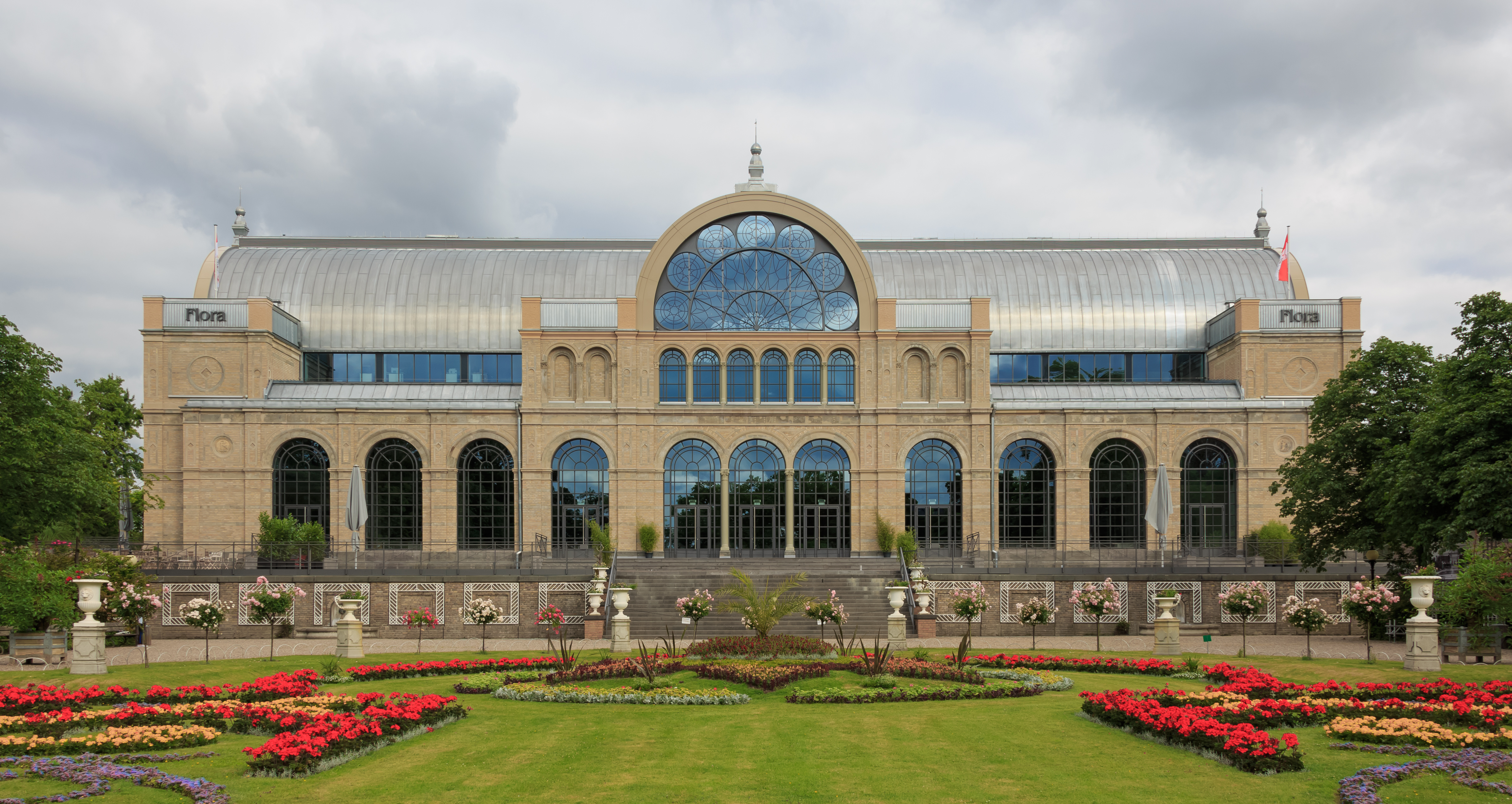
Flora Köln

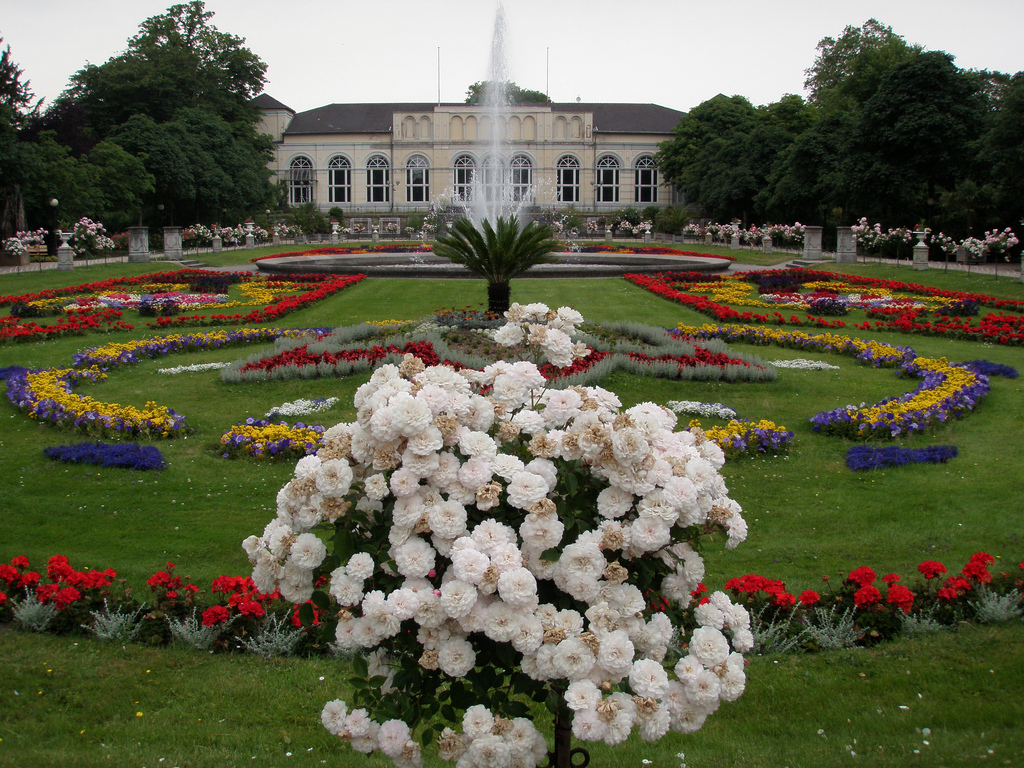
Flora und Botanischer Garten in 2011

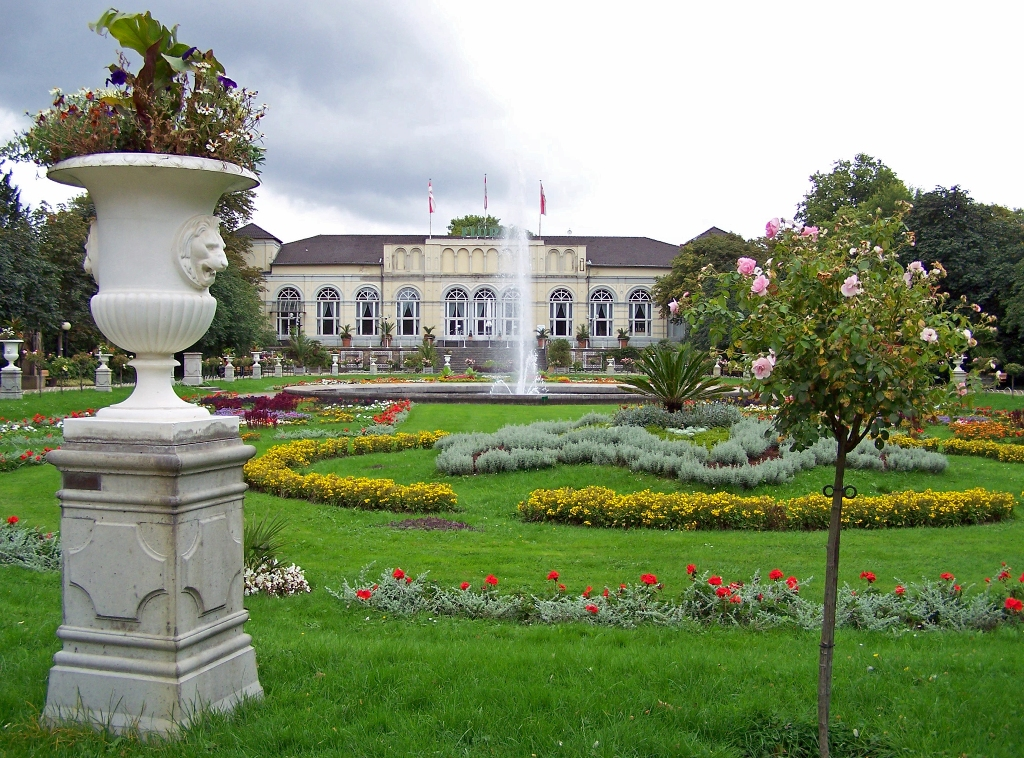
Flora und Botanischer Garten in 2007

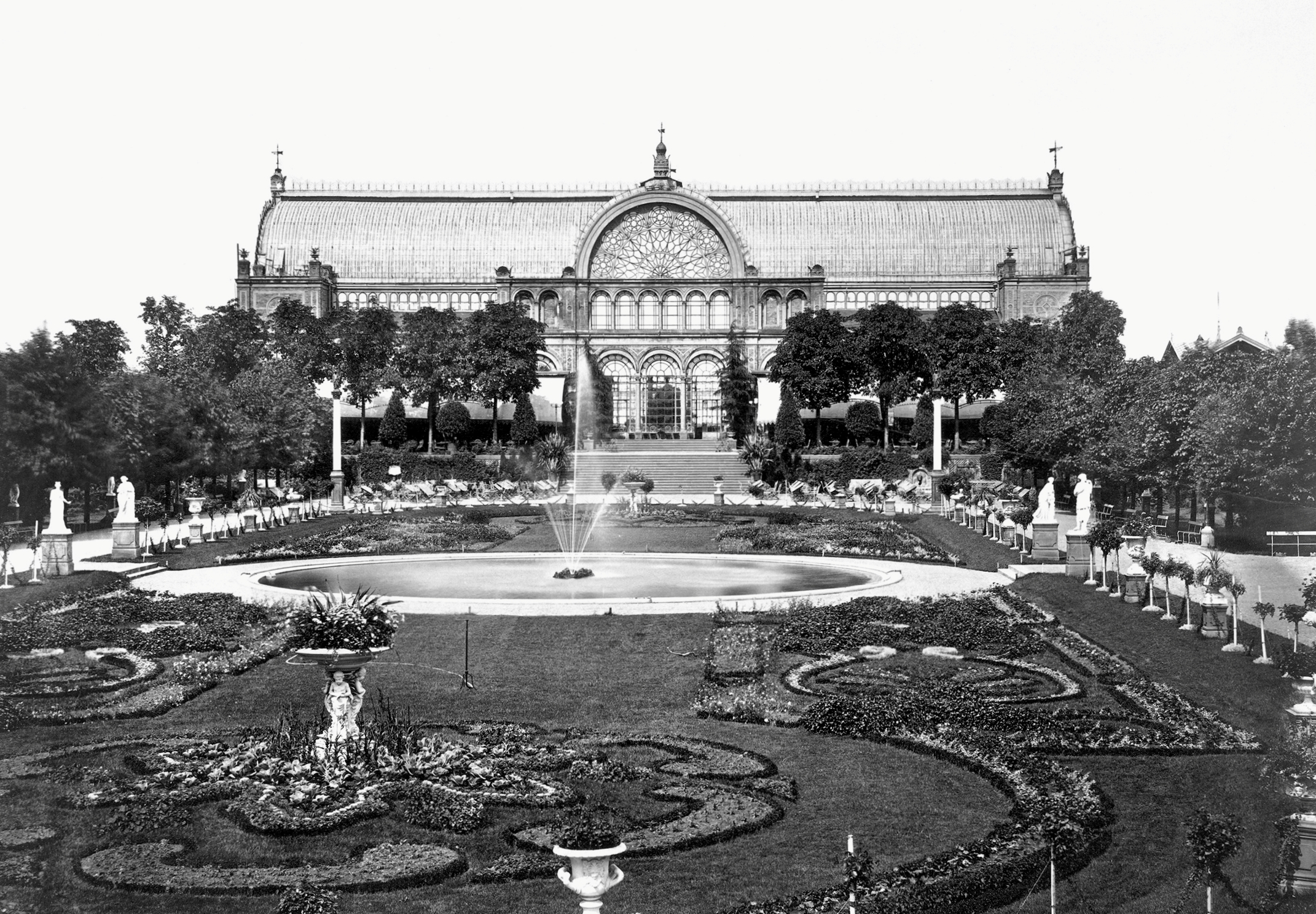
Flora und Botanischer Garten in 1880

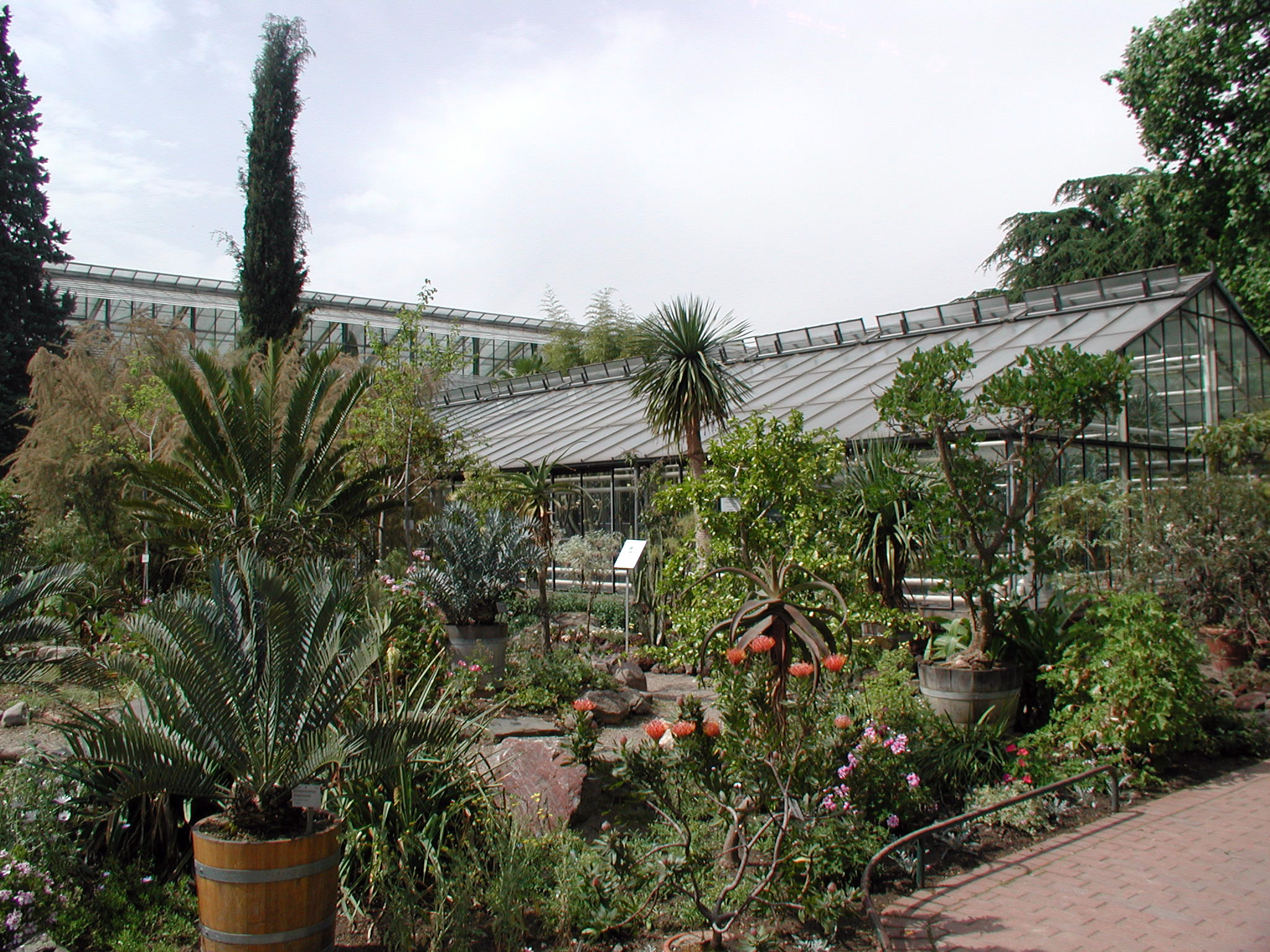
Cactus house

The Flora und Botanischer Garten Köln (11.5 hectares) is a municipal formal park and botanical garden located adjacent to Cologne Zoological Garden at Amsterdamer Straße 34, Cologne, North Rhine-Westphalia, Germany. It is open daily without charge.

The garden dates to 1863 when a private company was organized to create Flora park (5.5 hectares) as a replacement for the city's older botanical garden near the Cologne Cathedral, which in 1857 was destroyed for construction of the central railway station. This new park was designed by Peter Joseph Lenné in 1864 in a mixed German style, incorporating French Baroque, Italian Renaissance, and English landscape garden elements. In its center is a glass palace (orangery) structure of cast iron and glass patterned upon the Crystal Palace (London) and Jardin d'hiver (Paris), which served as an exhibition site through the late 19th century, including horticultural exhibitions in 1875 and 1888, and an industrial exhibition in 1889. Frauen-Rosenhof, an Art Nouveau garden, was added in 1906.

Between 1912 and 1914, as it suffered financial problems, the garden was acquired by the city, which in 1914 built an adjacent botanical garden (4.5 hectares). These two gardens were united in 1920, with new glasshouses and exhibition houses for exotic and tropical plants added in the 1950s.

Flora park was restored in 1987, and today contains an Italian Renaissance garden with hornbeam pergolas, cascade, and the (since a couple of years restored) Flora Temple, surrounded by gardens in the English landscape style, as well as a heather garden, fern garden, fragrance garden, Mediterranean garden, and pond. It also contains a number of notable trees, some dating to the garden's establishment; more than 60 specimens have been designated natural monuments.

The botanical garden cultivates nearly 10,000 types of plants, including approximately 2000 species in its alpine garden. It also contains good collections of magnolias, rhododendrons, coniferous trees, maples, and Hamamelidaceae, as well as a medicinal plant garden and farmer's garden of local crops. About 5,000 species are presented in four exhibition greenhouses:

- Main greenhouse – tropical rainforest plants.
- Small tropical house – tropical crops including bamboo, cinnamon, cocoa, coconut palm, coffee, pineapple, sugar cane, and vanilla, plus water and marsh plants including rice, taro, lotus, and water lilies.
- Subtropical house (opened 1964) – subtropical plants from the Americas, Africa, Asia, and Australia, including camellias, proteas, and tree ferns.
- Cactus house – cacti and succulents from the world's deserts and semi-deserts.

== See also ==
- Forstbotanischer Garten Köln
- List of botanical gardens in Germany
