= Nippes, Cologne =

Nippes
- Borough of Cologne
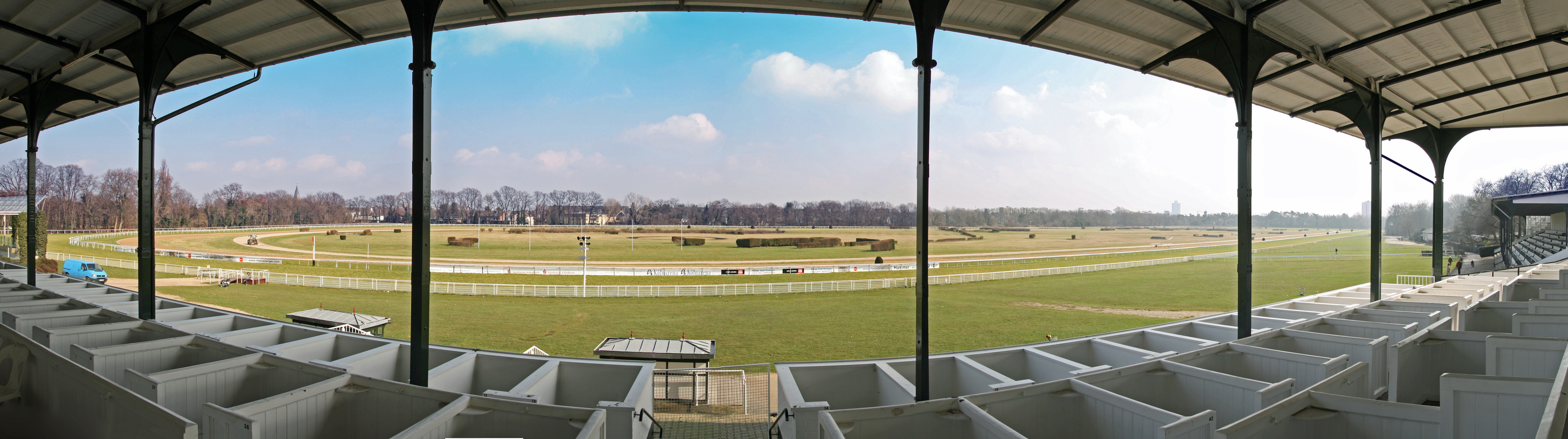
- Cologne-Weidenpesch Racecourse

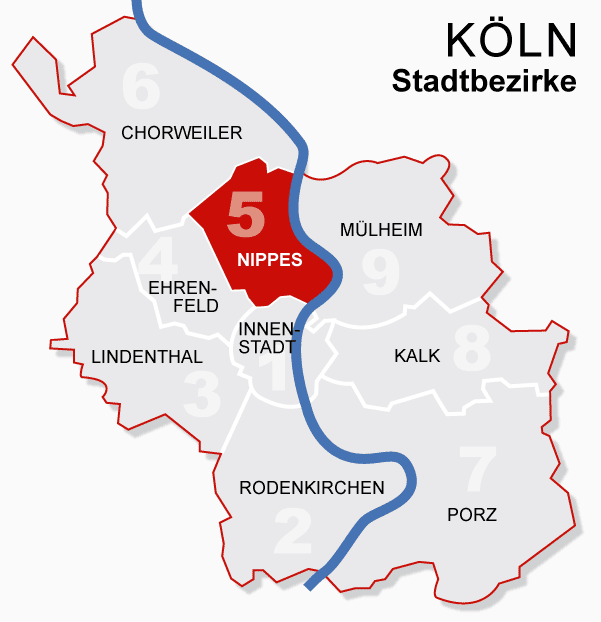
- Location within Cologne
- Interactive map of Nippes
- Location within Germany Location within North Rhine-Westphalia
- Coordinates: 50.9644°N 6.95833°E
- Country: Germany
- State: North Rhine-Westphalia
- Admin. region: Cologne
- District: Urban district
- City: Cologne

Area
  - Total: 31.75 km^{2} (12.26 sq mi)

Population (2020-12-31)
  - Total: 117,130
  - Density: 3,689/km^{2} (9,555/sq mi)
- Time zone: UTC+01:00 (CET)
  - Summer (DST): UTC+02:00 (CEST)

Nippes (German: Köln-Nippes; Kölsch: Neppes [ˈnépəs]) is the fifth borough (Stadtbezirk) of Cologne, Germany. Nippes was incorporated into the city of Cologne in 1888 and the district was created in 1975. A large Ford Europe production plant is located in Niehl, the north-eastern part of the district.

Nippes borders the Cologne boroughs of Chorweiler to the north, Mülheim to the east, Innenstadt to the south, and Ehrenfeld to the south-west.

== Subdivisions ==
Nippes consists of seven Stadtteile (city parts):

#	City part	Population (2009)	Area (km^{2})	Pop. per km^{2}	map
501	Nippes	33,948	2,99	11,351	District map of Nippes
502	Mauenheim	5,641	0,49	11,543	District map of Nippes
503	Riehl	11,173	2,39	4,674	District map of Nippes
504	Niehl	18,249	12,1	1,512	District map of Nippes
505	Weidenpesch	13,566	3,91	3,469	District map of Nippes
506	Longerich	13,536	6,14	2,203	District map of Nippes
507	Bilderstöckchen	15,028	3,76	3,992	District map of Nippes
source: Die Kölner Stadtteile in Zahlen 2010 (in German)

== Transport ==
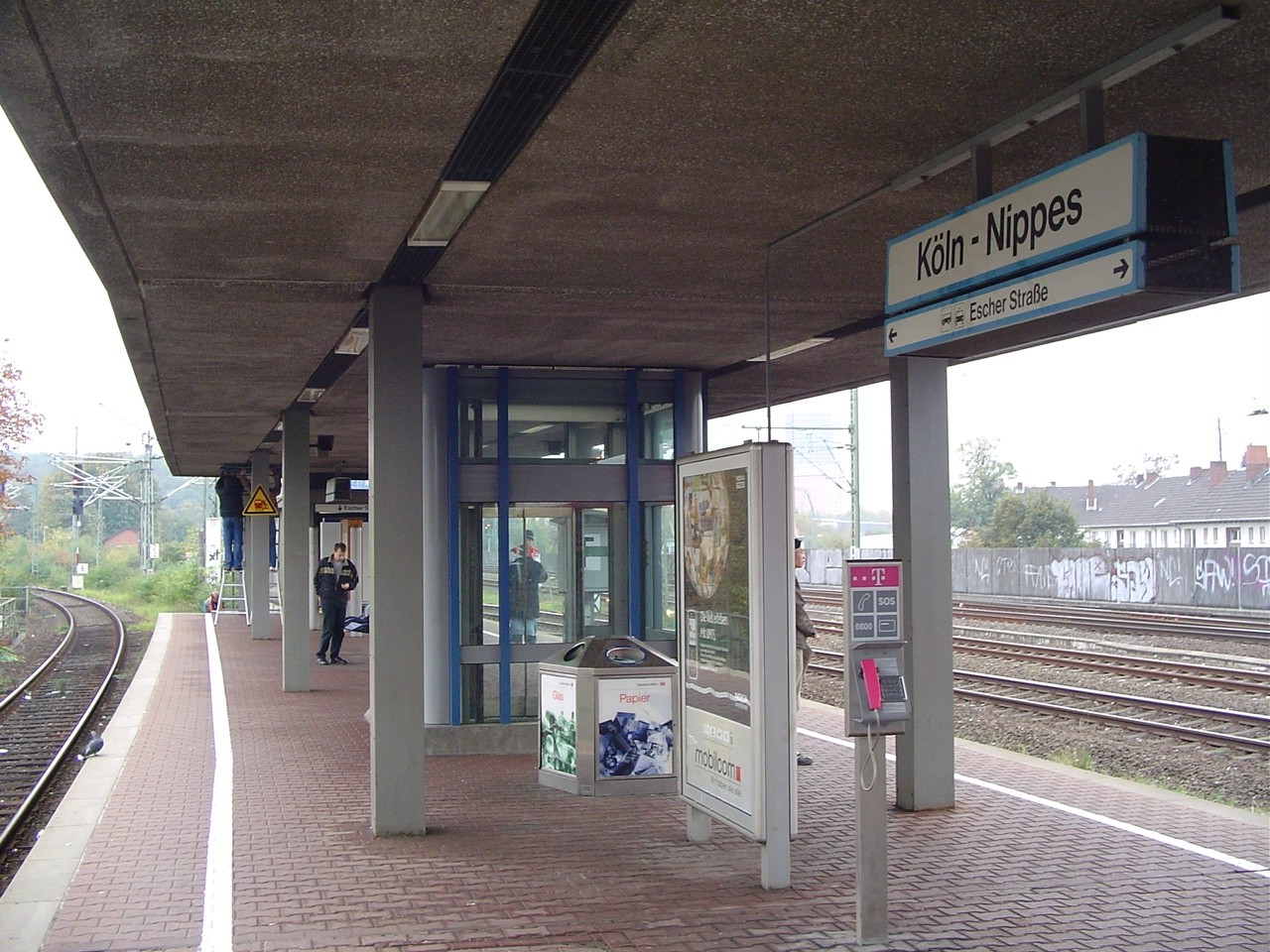
Cologne Nippes station

Nippes is served by numerous railway stations and main highways. Stations include Köln-Nippes, Köln Geldernstraße/Parkgürtel, and Köln-Longerich, as well as numerous light rail stations on Cologne Stadtbahn lines 12, 15, 16, and 18. Bundesautobahn 57 connects Nippes to the Cologne motorway ring.

=== Rhine bridges ===
- B 51 Mülheimer Brücke

== Notable people ==
- Fritz Schramma (born 1947), mayor of Cologne from 2000 until 2009
- Gaby Köster (born 1961), actress and cabaret artist
