= Duckterath station =

Railway station in Germany

Duckterath
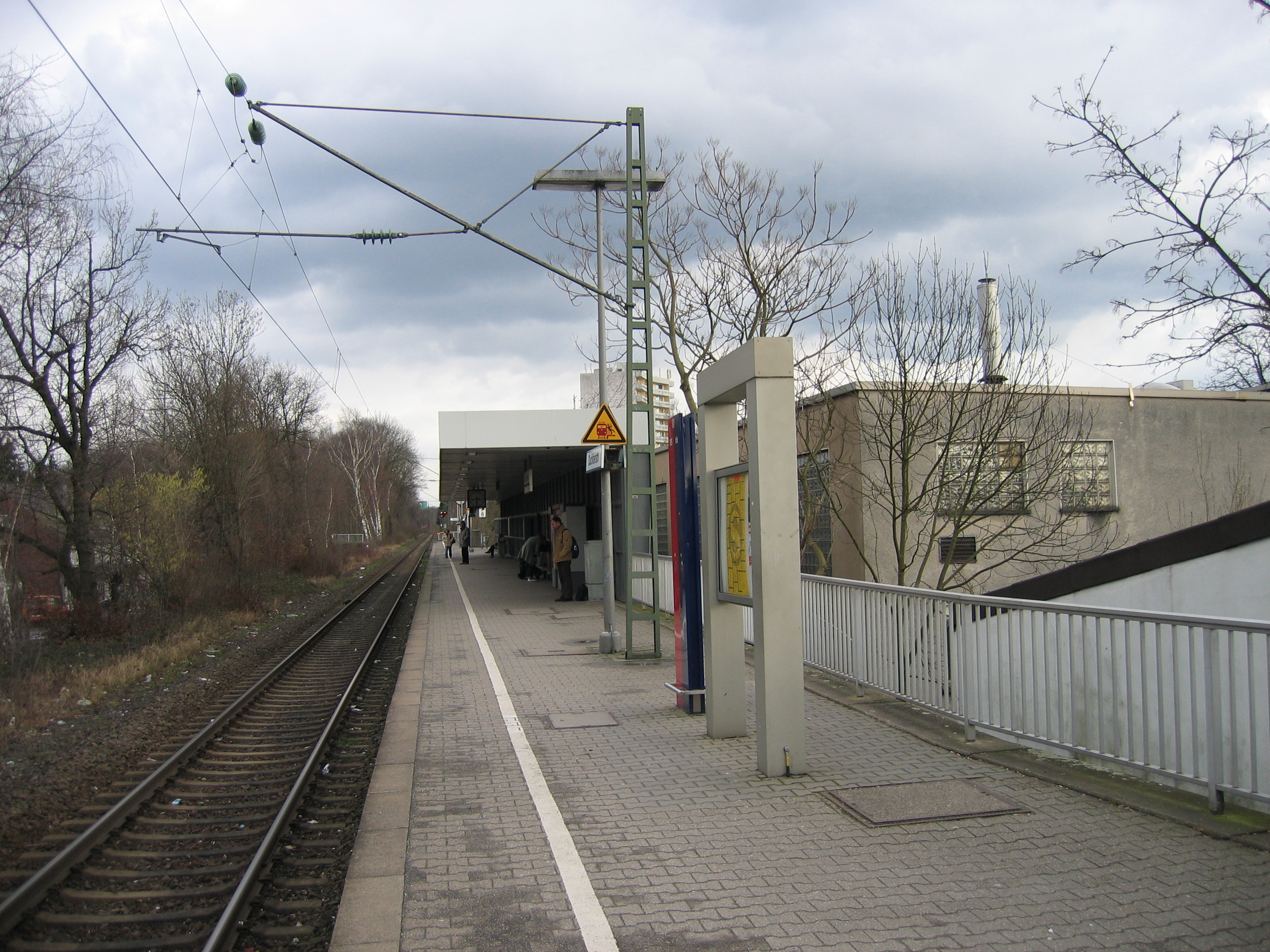

General information
- Location: Damaschkestr. 4, Bergisch Gladbach, NRW; Germany
- Coordinates: 50°59′05″N 7°06′16″E
- Lines: Sülz Valley Railway (KBS 450.11)
- Platforms: 1

Construction
- Accessible: Yes

Other information
- Station code: 1371
- DS100 code: KDUK
- IBNR: 8001566
- Category: 5
- Fare zone: VRS: 2310
- Website: www.bahnhof.de

History
- Opened: 1950/52

Services
Preceding station	Cologne S-Bahn	Following station
Bergisch Gladbach Terminus	S11	Köln-Dellbrück towards Düsseldorf Airport Terminal
Location
- Location within North Rhine-Westphalia

Duckterath station is a station in the city of Bergisch Gladbach in the German state of North Rhine-Westphalia, on the Sülz Valley Railway. It is served by S-Bahn line S 11, operated at 20-minute intervals.
