= Köln-Holweide station =

Railway station in Holweide, Germany

Coordinates: 50.97618°N 7.041083°E

Köln Holweide
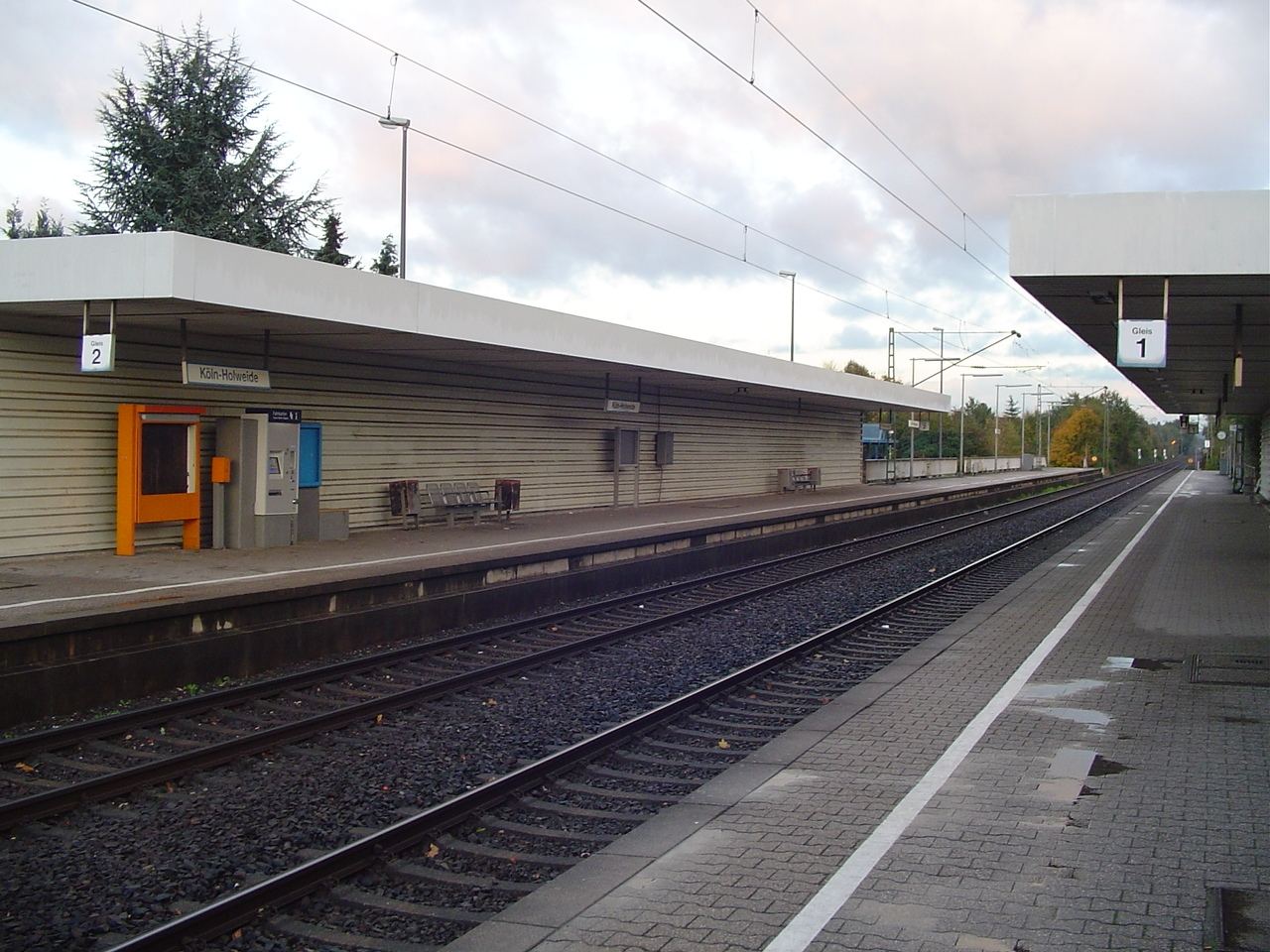

General information
- Location: Pfarrer-Maybaum-Weg; 51067 Köln; Cologne, NRW; Germany
- Owner: Deutsche Bahn
- Operator: DB Netz; DB Station&Service
- Line: Sülz Valley Railway

Construction
- Accessible: Yes

Other information
- Station code: 3332
- DS100 code: KKH
- IBNR: 03369
- Category: 5
- Fare zone: VRS: 2100
- Website: www.bahnhof.de

History
- Opened: 1950

Services
Preceding station	Cologne S-Bahn	Following station
Köln-Dellbrück towards Bergisch Gladbach	S11	Köln-Mülheim towards Düsseldorf Airport Terminal
Location

Köln-Holweide is a passenger railway station situated between the Holweide and Höhenhaus boroughs of Cologne, Germany. It is situated on the line from Köln-Mülheim to Bergisch Gladbach and served by the S11 line of the Cologne S-Bahn.

== History ==
The station's history has strong ties to football - the local club SC Preußen Dellbrück was successfully competing for the German championship in the early 1950s. As many fans of the club were local to Holweide, they demanded a local railway stop so they could get on and off the special train services to away games more easily. This led to the then-president of SC Preußen Dellbrück, Willy Röhrig, lobbying the Deutsche Bundesbahn to open a station in Holweide. The DB agreed under the condition that a passenger access ramp would have to be provided by the club, which posed little problems to Röhrig, as he was working in the building industry. The station was therefore erected quickly, and trains soon began calling there even on regular services.

Due to the ever-growing number of commuters between Cologne and Bergisch Gladbach, the station was extensively refurbished in 1972 and electrified in 1975. An S-Bahn service from Köln-Chorweiler to Bergisch Gladbach started calling at the station.

Today, the station has two side platforms with a height of 76 cm, a street-level access to each platform and stairs leading to a road underpass on the other ends of the platforms. The platform height cannot be raised to the 96 cm needed for disabled access because of the freight traffic on the line to Bergisch Gladbach. There are 87 parking bays in the car park and 20 bicycle racks.
