= Köln-Dellbrück station =

Railway station in Dellbrück, Germany

Köln Dellbrück
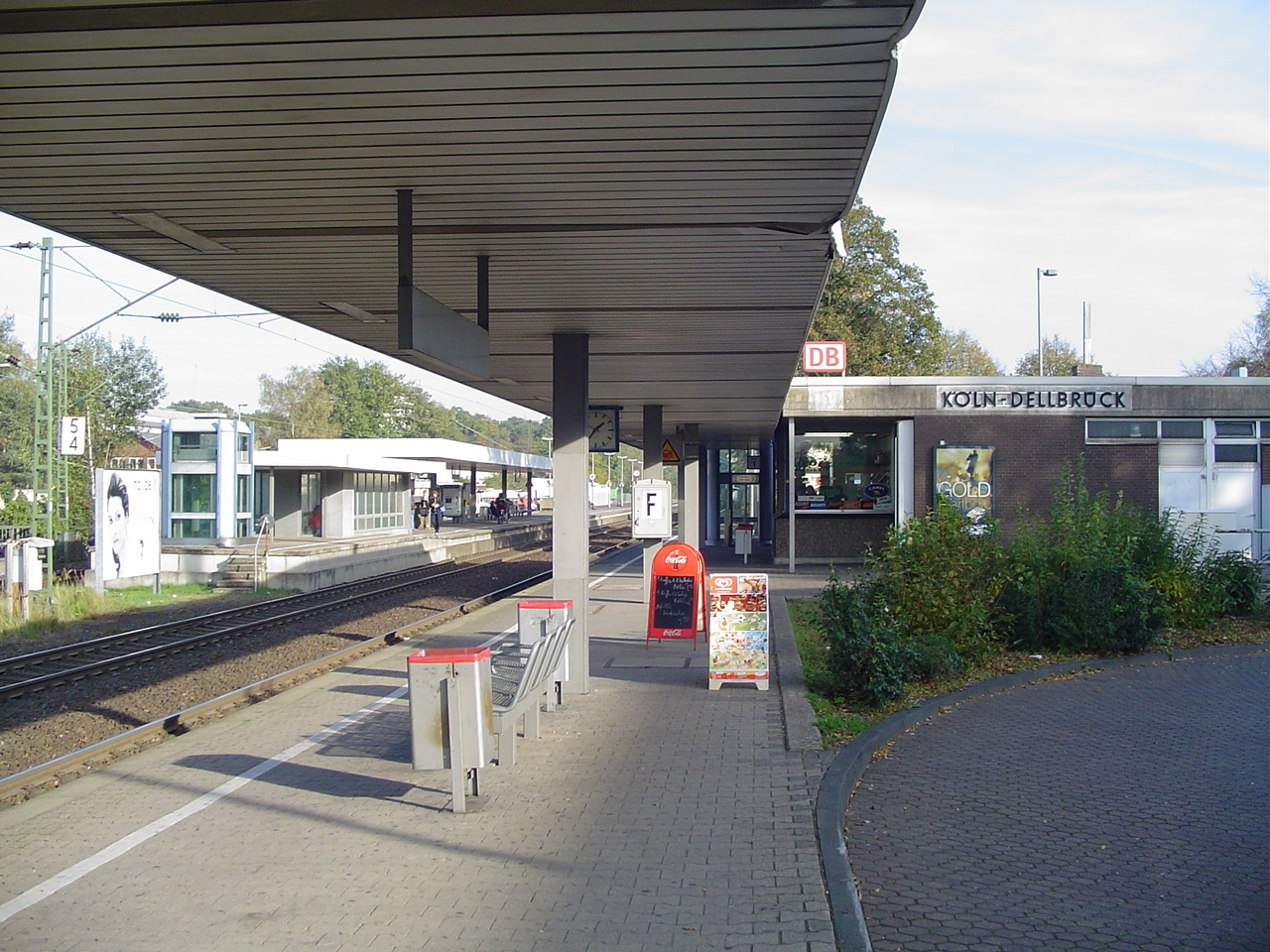

General information
- Location: Dellbrücker Hauptstr. 191, Dellbrück, Cologne, NRW; Germany
- Coordinates: 50°58′54″N 7°4′15″E
- Line: Cologne–Lindlar railway
- Platforms: 2

Construction
- Accessible: Yes

Other information
- Station code: 3328
- DS100 code: KKDB
- IBNR: 8003367
- Category: 4
- Fare zone: VRS: 2100
- Website: www.bahnhof.de

History
- Opened: 15 December 1868

Services
Preceding station	Cologne S-Bahn	Following station
Duckterath towards Bergisch Gladbach	S11	Köln-Holweide towards Düsseldorf Airport Terminal
Location
- Location within North Rhine-Westphalia

Köln-Dellbrück is a railway station on the line from Köln-Mülheim to Bergisch Gladbach situated at Dellbrück, Cologne in western Germany. It is served by the S11 line of the Cologne S-Bahn.

== History ==
Dellbrück station was opened in 1868 by the Bergisch-Märkische Railway Company as part of the Mülheim–Bergisch Gladbach railway. Two years later in 1870, the station building was inaugurated after the council had built the building free of charge. The two-storey building was built in a late classical Rundbogenstil (Romanesque revival style) with a half-timber gable and, in addition to the rail facilities, also contained a restaurant. An adjacent level crossing over the road axis of Dellbrücker Hauptstraße/Diepeschrather Straße was initially unprotected. Instead, there were black and white signs saying: "Stop! As soon as a train approaches, pedestrians, riders, drivers of cattle and beasts of burden must stop here. Violators will be punished!" A freight yard was established to the east of the station in 1902 after industry and craft businesses had been attracted with favourable land. Extensions were made to the station building in 1904 and 1908. A second track was laid and a road underpass was built in 1908.

On weekdays, workers commuted from Dellbrück station to the factories in Deutz, Kalk and Mülheim. At the weekend, patronage was even greater: at the turn of the century eight to nine extra trains were used to manage the excursion traffic from nearby cities to Dellbrück.

In addition to its normal function, the station building has been used by the Dellbrück population for festivities. So, the press reported a feast on the occasion of the birthday of Emperor Wilhelm I on 24 March 1881 in the decorated station building, which was illuminated by Bengal fire.

With the nationalisation of the Bergisch-Märkische Railway Company, the station became part of the Prussian state railways on the 1 June 1882. The roof of the station building suffered serious damage during an air raid on the night of 22 and 23 August 1943. In 1950, the Preußen Dellbrück football club advanced all the way to the semifinals of the German championship and on Sundays several special trains ran to Dellbrück from Reutlingen, Mannheim and Offenbach. In 1979, the old station building was demolished. A functional glass and concrete building was completed in its place in the typical contemporary style in 1981.

== Rail services ==
Dellbrück is served by line 11 of the Cologne S-Bahn at 20-minute intervals from Monday to Friday and at 30-minute intervals on the weekend. In addition, a single morning service of Regionalbahn service RB 24 (Kall–Euskirchen–Cologne–Deutz) is extended on school days to Dellbrück and from there runs back to Cologne Hauptbahnhof. In addition, the station is passed by freight trains of Häfen und Güterverkehr Köln (Cologne ports and freight, HGK), running to and from the freight yard in Bergisch Gladbach.

== Infrastructure ==
The station has two electrified through tracks running between two outside platforms for the S-Bahn. Both platforms have a length of 232 metres and a height of 76 cm (measured from the top of the rail), which do not allow level access to the class 423 electric multiple units running on line S11. The platforms are staggered, so they directly face each other only for a length of 120 m. There is a bypass track to the north of the platform for services to Cologne that is used by the already mentioned RB 24 service. This is electrified, but only over a length of 210 m that is available for passenger operations.

A single-track section begins nearly 500 m east of the station, which continues to the end of the line in Bergisch Gladbach. Although there is a connection to the freight yard, only the tracks used by the S-Bahn track are electrified. Between Dellbrück station and the merging of the tracks to its east there are two disused private sidings.

== Buses ==
South of the east-bound platform there is a small bus station, where buses run to Köln-Dünnwald, Köln-Porz and Bergisch Gladbach. This is designed so that the ral and bus platform merge with no height difference. The Cologne Stadtbahn line from Deutz/Mülheim to Thielenbruch runs about 700 m south of the station.
