= Leverkusen Chempark station =

Railway station in Germany

Leverkusen Chempark
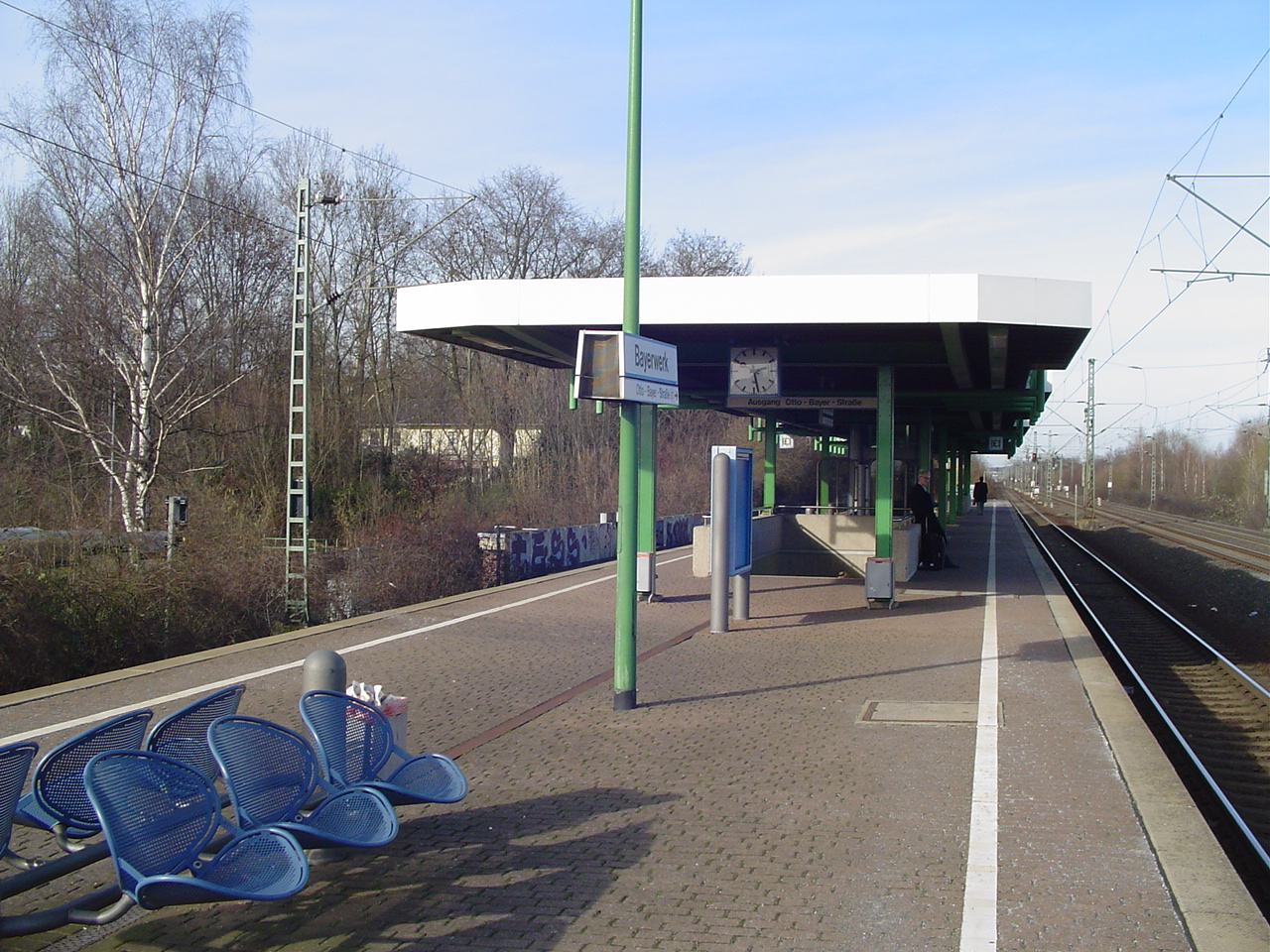
- Bayerwerk station in 2007

General information
- Location: Otto-Bayer-Str.10, Leverkusen, Cologne, NRW; Germany
- Coordinates: 51°00′41″N 6°59′48″E
- Line: Cologne–Duisburg railway
- Platforms: 2
- Tracks: 2
- Connections: S6

Construction
- Accessible: Yes

Other information
- Station code: 437
- DS100 code: KBAY
- IBNR: 8000832
- Category: 5
- Fare zone: VRS: 2100 and 2200
- Website: www.bahnhof.de

History
- Opened: 2 June 1991
- Former names: Bayerwerk

Services
Preceding station	Rhine-Ruhr S-Bahn	Following station
Köln-Stammheim towards Köln-Nippes	S6	Leverkusen Mitte towards Essen Hbf
Location

Leverkusen Chempark station, known as Bayerwerk until 2013, is a railway station on the Cologne–Duisburg railway, situated on the border of Leverkusen and Cologne in the German state of North Rhine-Westphalia. It is named after the nearby Bayer chemical production plants. It is served by the S6 line of the Rhine-Ruhr S-Bahn at 20-minute intervals.

It is also served by the following bus routes: 151 and 152 (operated by Kölner Verkehrs-Betriebe), 201 (operated by Kraftverkehr Wupper-Sieg) and 255 (operated by Kraftverkehr Gebr. Wiedenhoff), all at 20-minute intervals.

== History ==
Before this station was built, there was a station one kilometre away called Leverkusen Wiesdorf, but it is now closed.

== See also ==
- Dormagen Chempark station
- Krefeld-Hohenbudberg Chempark station
