= Adam Adami (diplomat) =

German monk, diplomat and priest

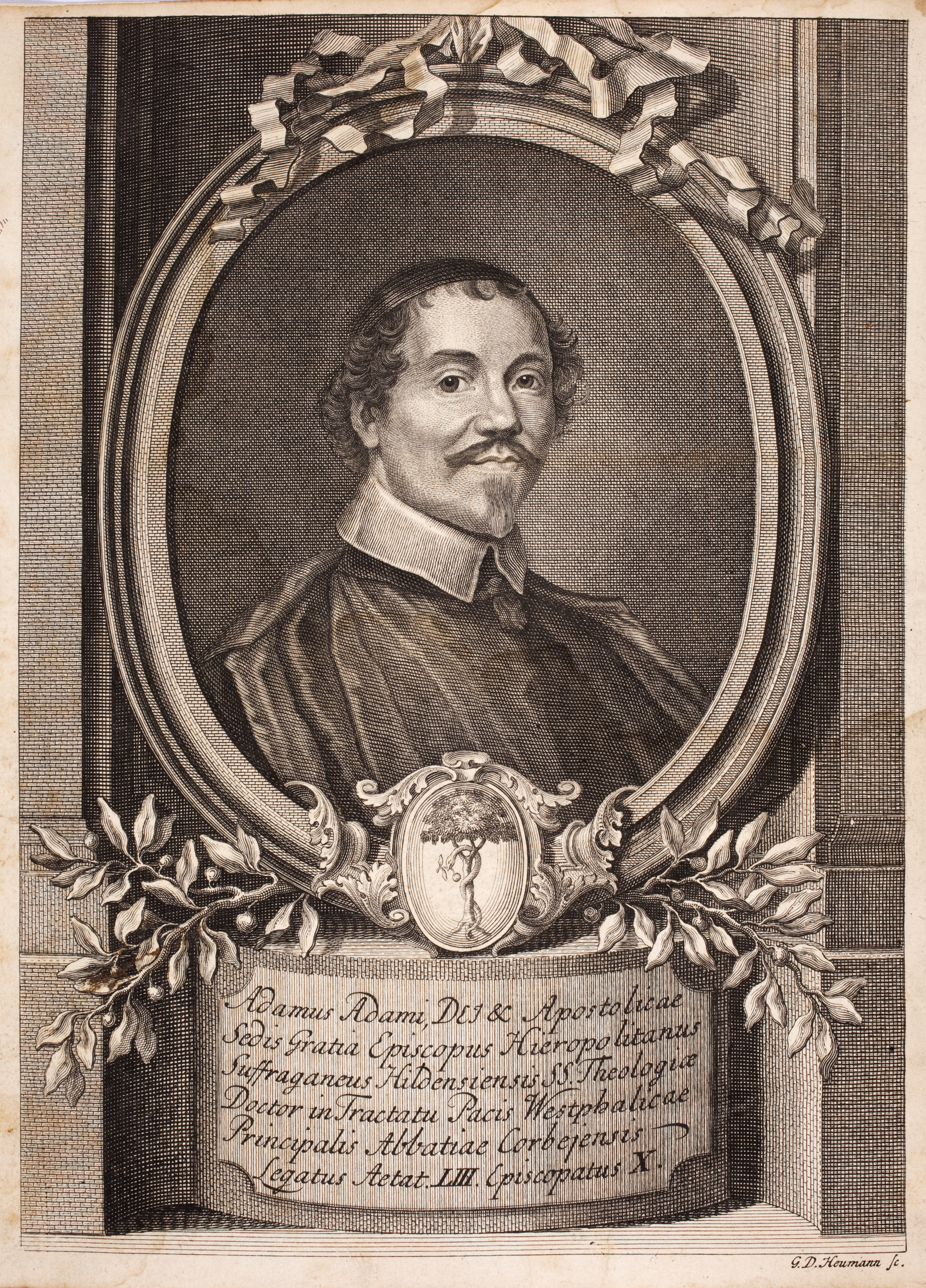
Adam Adami.

Adam Adami, O.S.B. (1603 or 1610 – 19 February 1663) was a German monk, diplomat and priest.

Born in Mülheim am Rhein, Adami seems to have made his first studies in Cologne. At the age of 19, he entered the Benedictine abbey of Brauweiler and occupied himself with theology and law studies. In 1633, he received the ordination to priesthood, one year later he became rector of the Benedictine seminary in Cologne, where he also acquired a doctorate in theology. In 1637 he followed a call to the abbey of St. Jacob in Mainz, where he served as prior and acquired a good reputation as a diplomat.

In the following year, Adami was elected to become prior of the monastery of Murhart. Murhart, like many surrounding abbeys, was subject of an administrative dispute between the Diocese of Würzburg and the dukes of Württemberg. Adami was chosen because he was expected to be able to best defend the rights of the abbeys in the years to come, during and following the Peace of Westphalia. Therefore he was sent in 1643 as the envoy of the restituted monasteries and chapels of Swabia to the peace negotiations.

During the negotiations, his legitimation as envoy was disputed, but he could obtain a second authorisation from the prince-abbot of Korvei. Adami's records of the proceedings of the negotiations are today the primary source of information on the Peace of Westphalia. He belonged to "Trimuvirate" of Franz Wilhelm von Wartenberg and Johann von Leuchselring to the group of Catholic maximalists against Trauttmansdorff and the Emperor.

From his point of view, the negotiations failed, though.

Later he was sent to Rome by the Prince-elector and Archbishop of Cologne, Maximilian Henry of Bavaria. With a recommendation from the former papal legate Fabio Chigi, Pope Innocent X appointed Adami as titular bishop of Hierapolis. Maximilian Henry also offered him the post as suffragan bishop of Hildesheim out of gratitude. Adami served in Hildesheim until his death there, while publishing several tracts on national law.

== Publications ==
- Arcana pacis Westphaliae, Frankfurt, 1698, anonymous publication. Published under his name in 1707, later as Relatio historica de pacificatione Osnabrugo-Monasteriensi. Accurante Jo. God. de Meiern, Leipzig 1738, 672 pages 4°.

== Sources ==
- Allgemeine Deutsche Biographie - online version at Wikisource; image version
- Zedlers Universal-Lexicon, vol. 1, p. 225-226
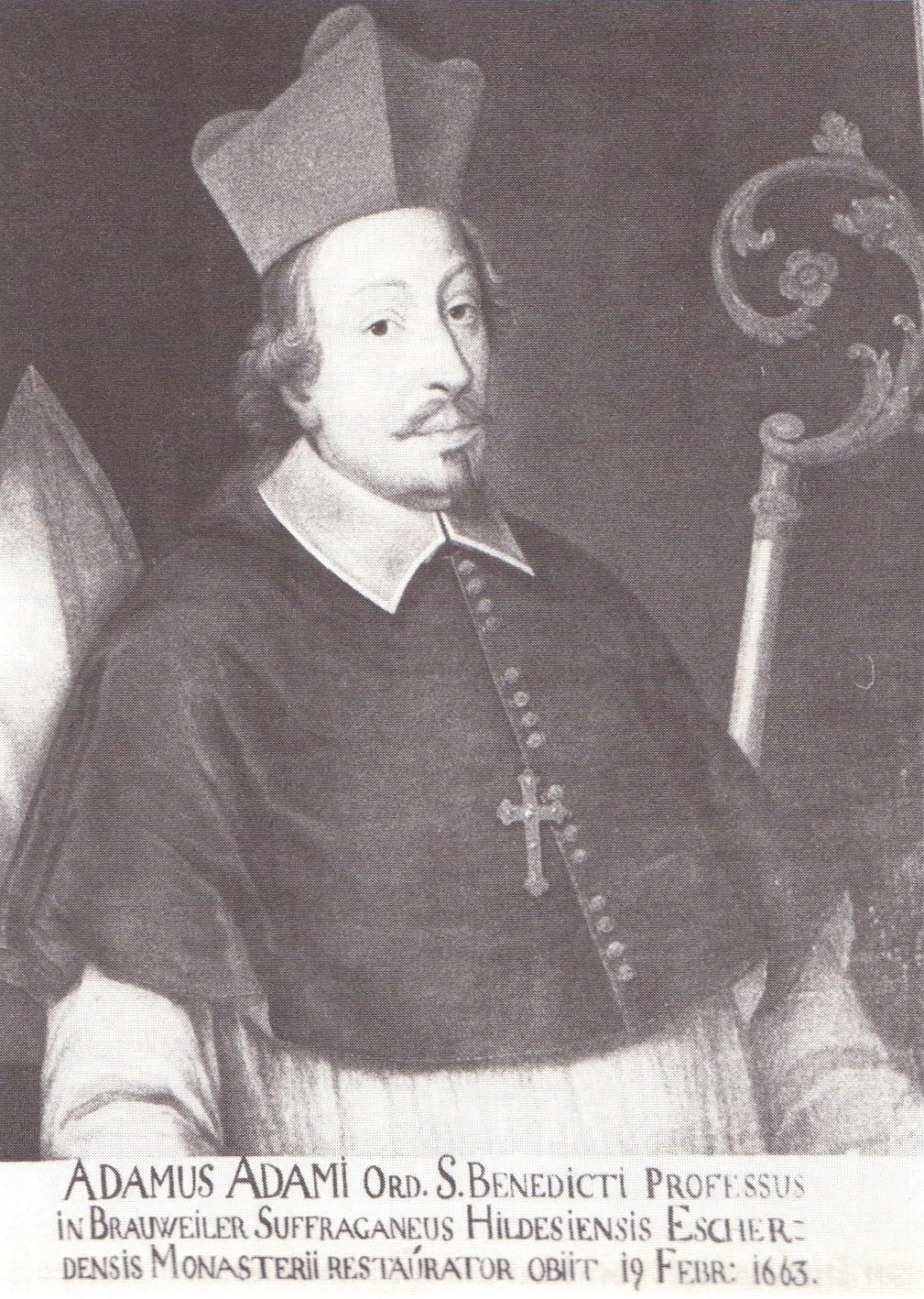
Adam Adami

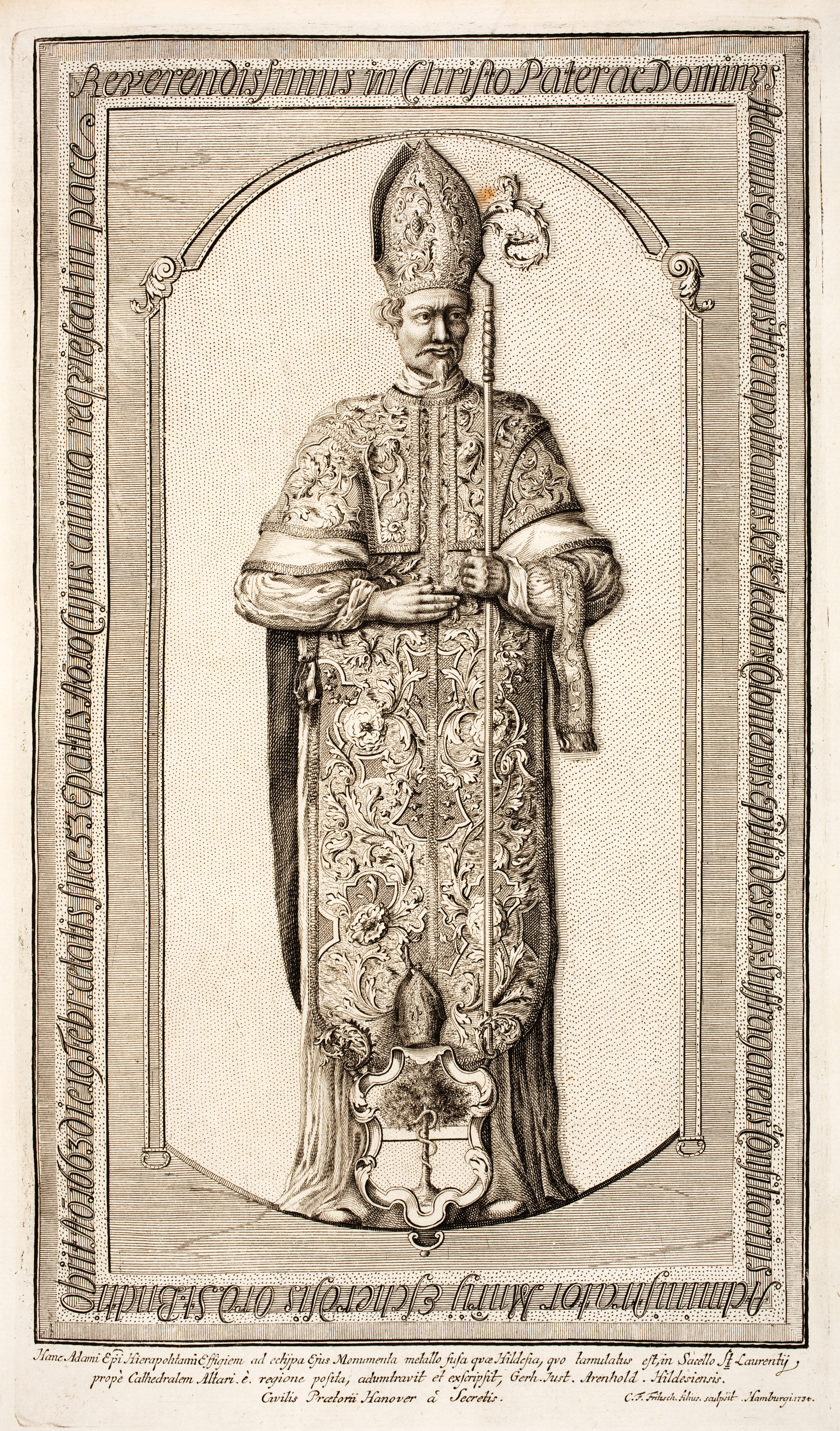
The grave of Adam Adami in Hildesheim. Etching by C.F. Fritzsch Filius, 1734.
