= Mülheim Bridge, Cologne =

Coordinates: 50°57′52″N 6°59′43″E

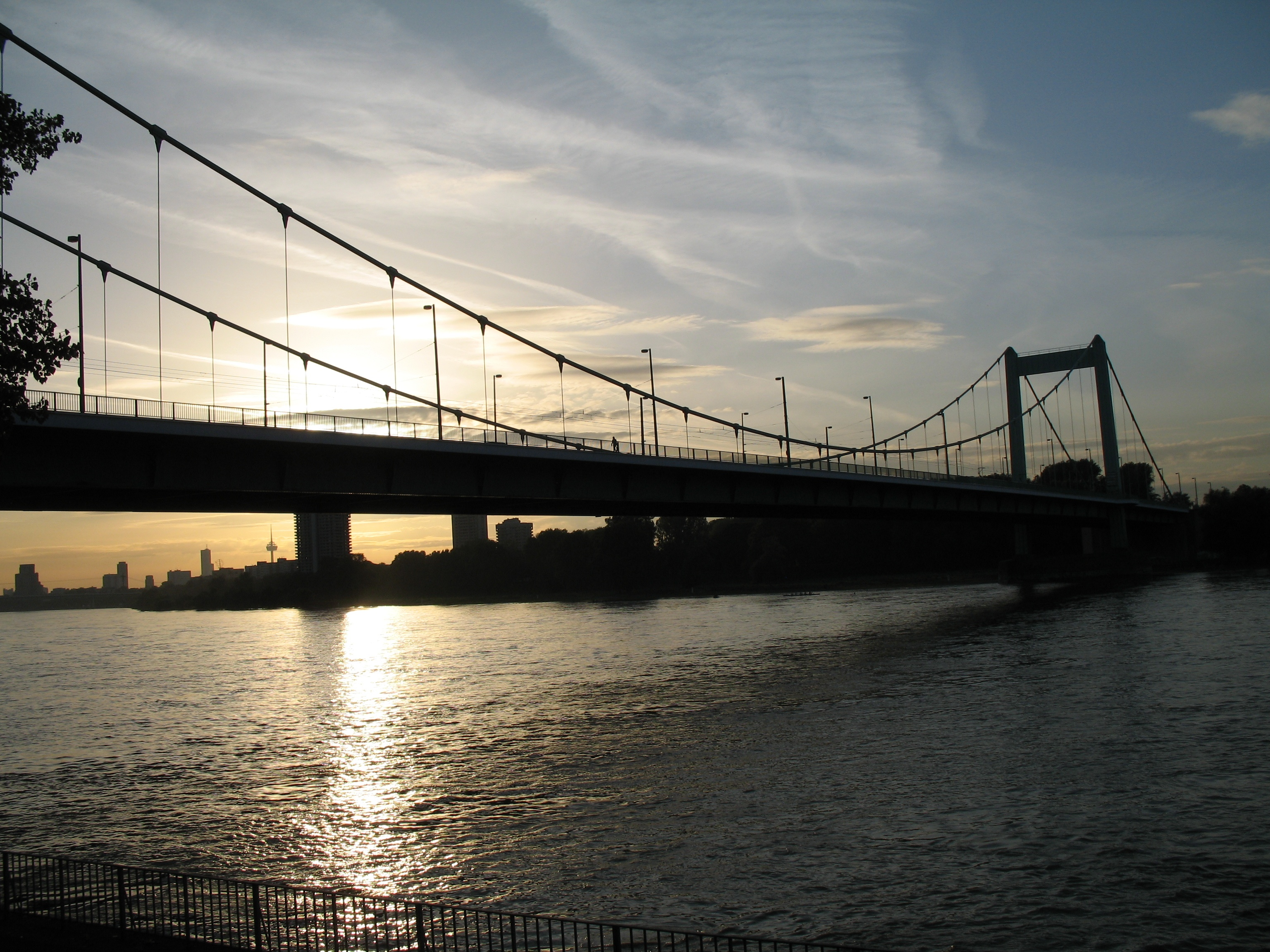
Mülheim Bridge looking into the afternoon sun

The Mülheim Bridge (German: Mülheimer Brücke [ˈmyːlhaɪmɐ ˌbʁʏkə]; Kölsch: Möllemer Bröck [ˈmø̂ləmɐ ˌbʁø̂k]) in Cologne is a suspension bridge on the river Rhine in western Germany. It has a main span of 315 metres. The bridge was originally completed in 1929. On 14–15 October 1944 an American bomb struck the chamber containing the demolition charges, destroying the bridge. The bridge was rebuilt between 1949 and 1951. It connects the city district Riehl on the west side of the river with Mülheim on the east side, after which the bridge is named.

== See also ==
- List of bridges in Germany
