= Cologne Mülheim Protestant Cemetery =

Cemetery in Germany

Coordinates: 50°57′45″N 7°00′44″E

Evangelical Protestant Cemetery of Cologne Mülheim
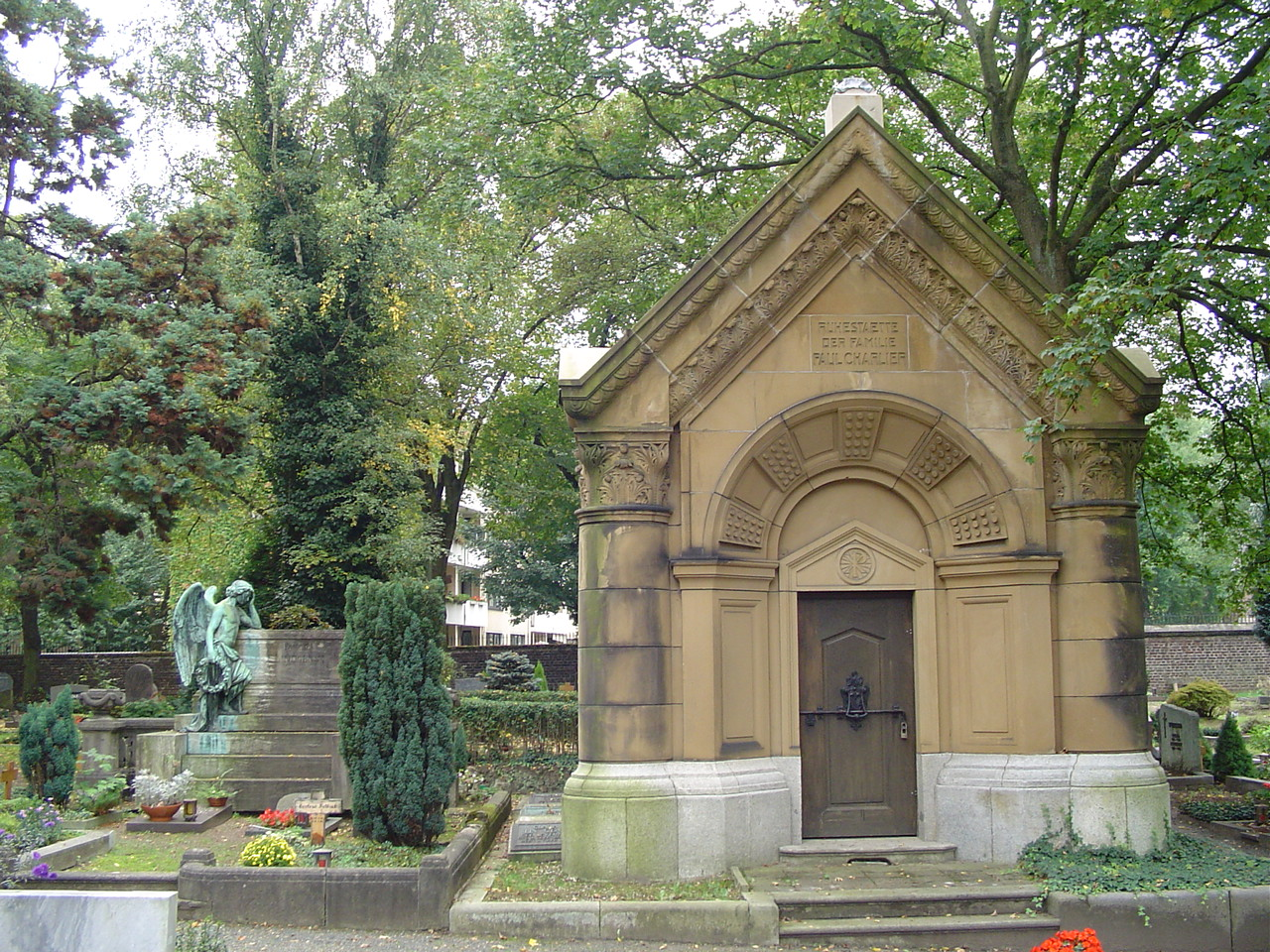
- Interactive map of Evangelical Protestant Cemetery of Cologne Mülheim

Details
- Established: 1614
- Location: Cologne
- Country: Germany
- Type: Protestant cemetery
- Find a Grave: 2556070

The Protestant cemetery (German: Evangelischer Friedhof Köln-Mülheim) Bergisch Gladbach road (Highway 506) in Mülheim district of Cologne existed since the beginning of the 17th century and is one of the oldest preserved cemeteries in Cologne, Germany. The cemetery is still in operation and used for burials.

== History ==
The roughly rectangular cemetery site was established in 1612 by the Reformed congregation and the Lutheran church was allowed to share the use of the cemetery. One of the first graves – the grave of Gertrude Stein Tilman (deceased on 25 May 1614) at the entrance – has remained to this day, as well as some elaborate family tombs and mausoleums, many of them dating back to 18th and 19th century. The wall surrounding the cemetery today was built in 1880.

Since 1981, the Protestant Cemetery Mülheim is under monument and cultural heritage protection.
