= Stammheim, Cologne =

Municipal part of Cologne, Germany

Coordinates: 50°59′15″N 6°59′32″E

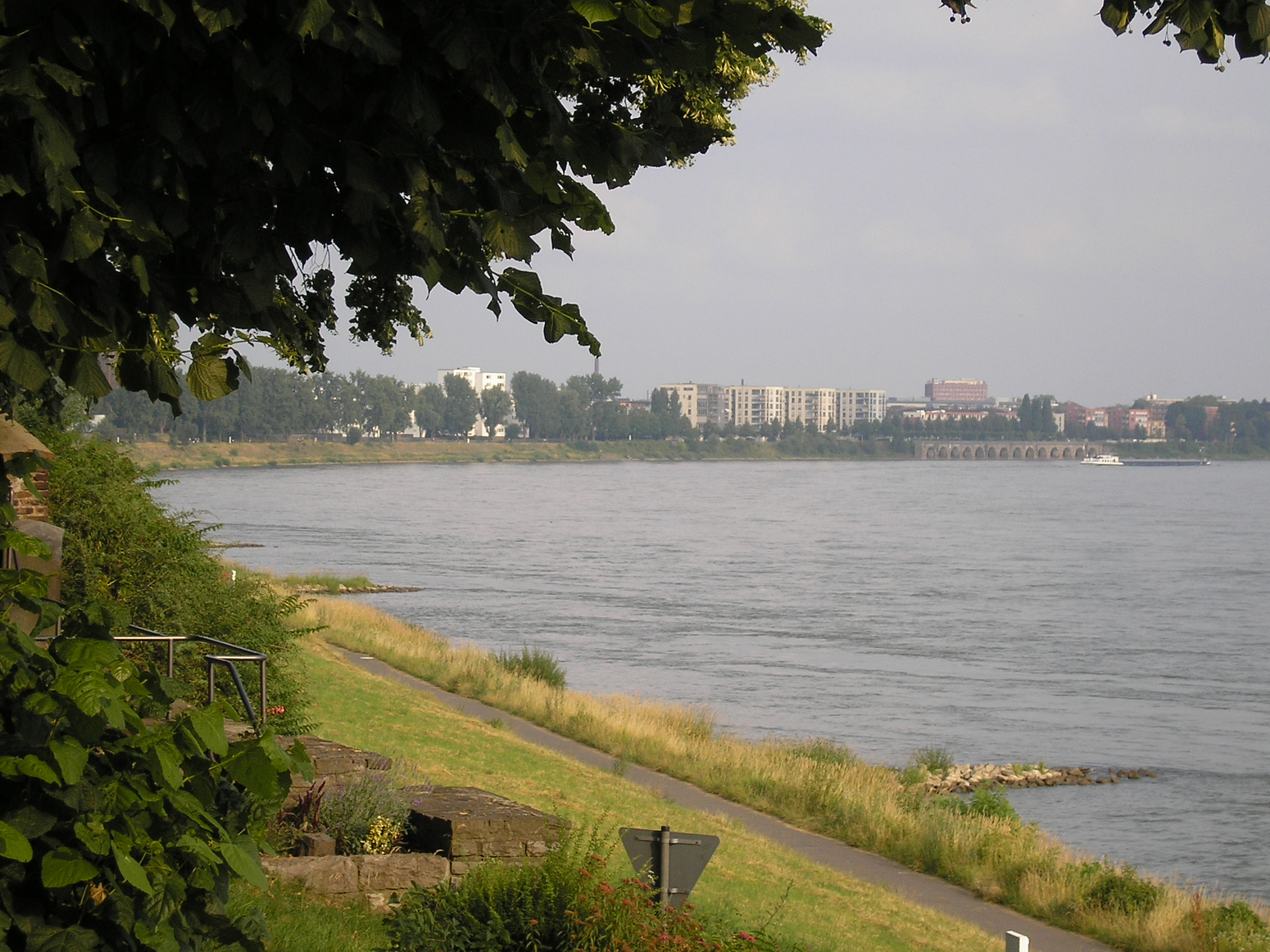
Stammheim riverfront

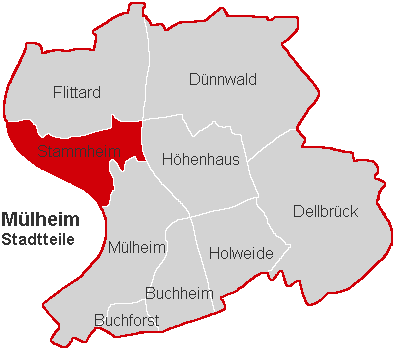
Map of Stammheim (shown in red) within the district of Mülheim

Stammheim (German pronunciation: [ˈʃtamhaɪm]) is a municipal part of Cologne, Germany and part of the district of Mülheim. Stammheim lies on the right bank of the river Rhine, between Mülheim (proper) and Flittard. The city part has 7.473 inhabitants (as of 31 December 2008) and covers an area of 3,75 km^{2}.

Stammheim was first mentioned in 959; the former Stammheim palace (Schloss Stammheim) was purchased by the Fürstenberg family in 1818, but heavily damaged during the Bombing of Cologne in World War II and later worked away completely. Stammheim is served by the Köln-Stammheim station.

== Transport links ==
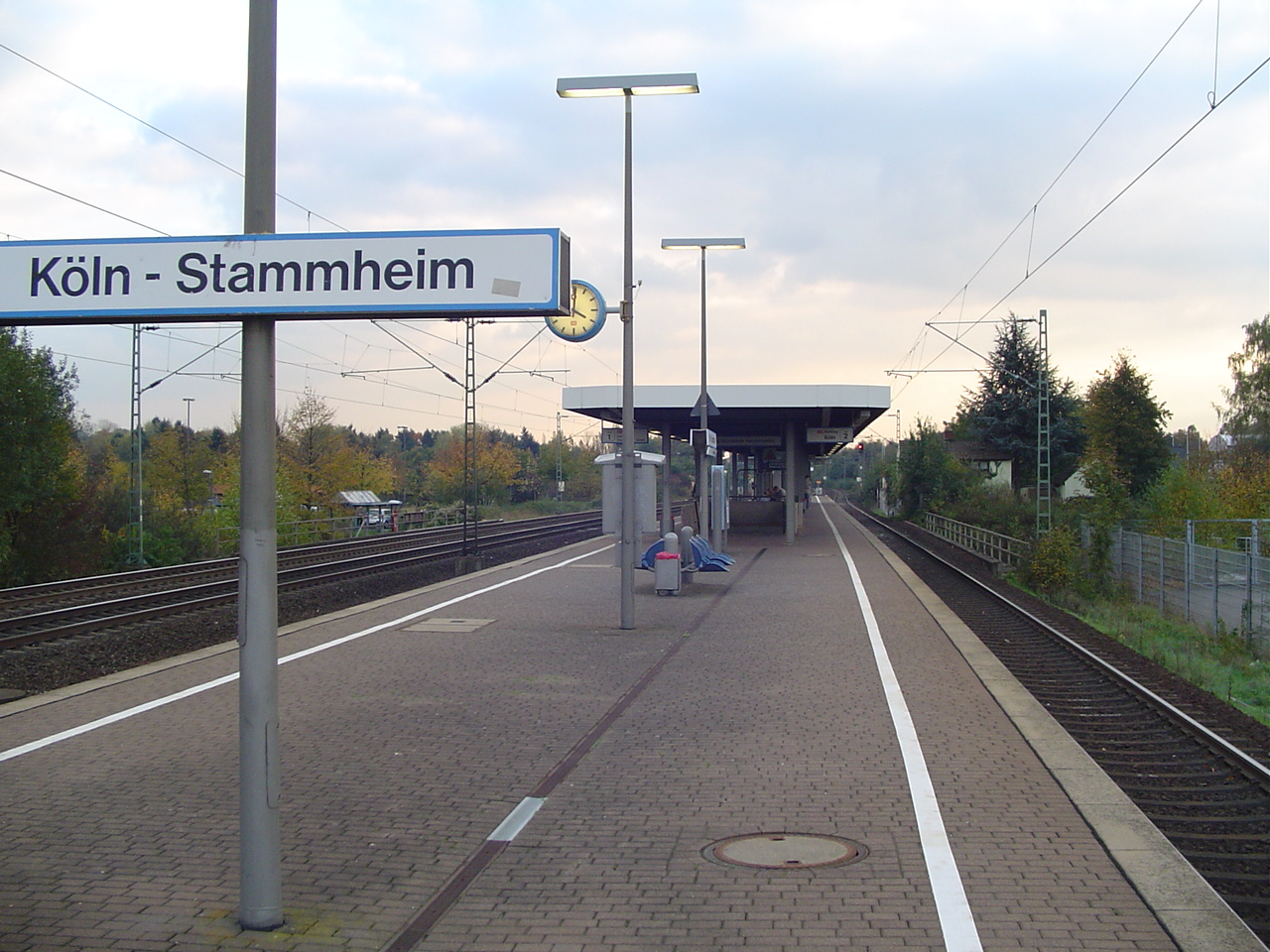
Cologne Stammheim suburban train station

Cologne S-Bahn has a station is Stammheim, which is served by line S6.
