= Köln-Stammheim station =

Railway station in Germany

Köln Stammheim
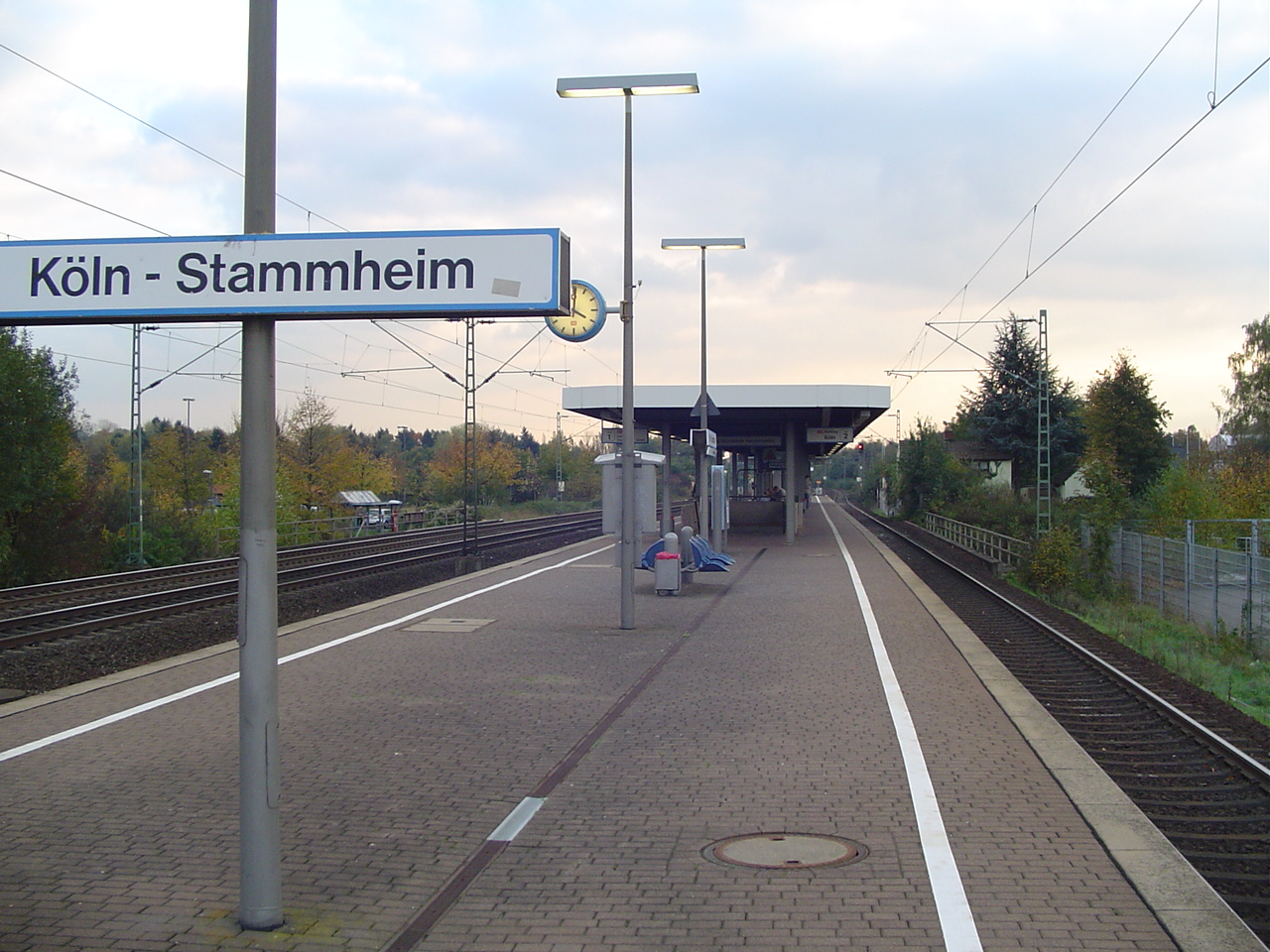

General information
- Location: Dünnwalder Kommunalweg 22, Cologne, NRW; Germany
- Coordinates: 50°59′24″N 7°00′07″E
- Line: Cologne–Duisburg railway
- Platforms: 1
- Tracks: 2

Construction
- Accessible: Yes

Other information
- Station code: 3338
- DS100 code: KKSH
- IBNR: 8003310
- Category: 5
- Fare zone: VRS: 2100
- Website: www.bahnhof.de

History
- Opened: 2 June 1991

Services
Preceding station	Rhine-Ruhr S-Bahn	Following station
Köln-Mülheim towards Köln-Nippes	S6	Leverkusen Chempark towards Essen Hbf
Location
- Location within North Rhine-Westphalia

Köln-Stammheim is a railway station situated at Stammheim, Cologne in western Germany. It is served by the S6 line of the Rhine-Ruhr S-Bahn at 20-minute intervals. The station is located on a bridge over the L101 Dunnwalder Kommunalweg road.
