= Johann von Leuchselring =

Johann von Leuchselring was Chancellor for the Free Imperial City of Augsburg from 1636 through 1645 and a leading Catholic negotiator in the Peace of Westphalia.

In the peace congress in Münster, starting in 1645, Johann von Leuchselring acted an envoy for the Catholic Council of the city of Augsburg and for the cities of Überlingen, Dinkelsbühl, Biberach, Ravensburg, Kaufbeuren, Buchhorn, Buchau, Rottweil, Schwäbisch Gmünd, Offenburg, Pfullendorf, Gengenbach, and Zell am Harmersbach.

In the second half of 1646 war returned to Augsburg. Johann von Leuchselring was the official representative of the council of the Catholic imperial estates including committee of the Protestant citizenship, in which the patrician Johann David Herwart played a leading role ensuring a balance in negotiations between Catholics and Protestants at the Peace of Westphalia.
