= Cologne–Lindlar railway =

Coordinates: 51°00′59″N 7°19′47″E

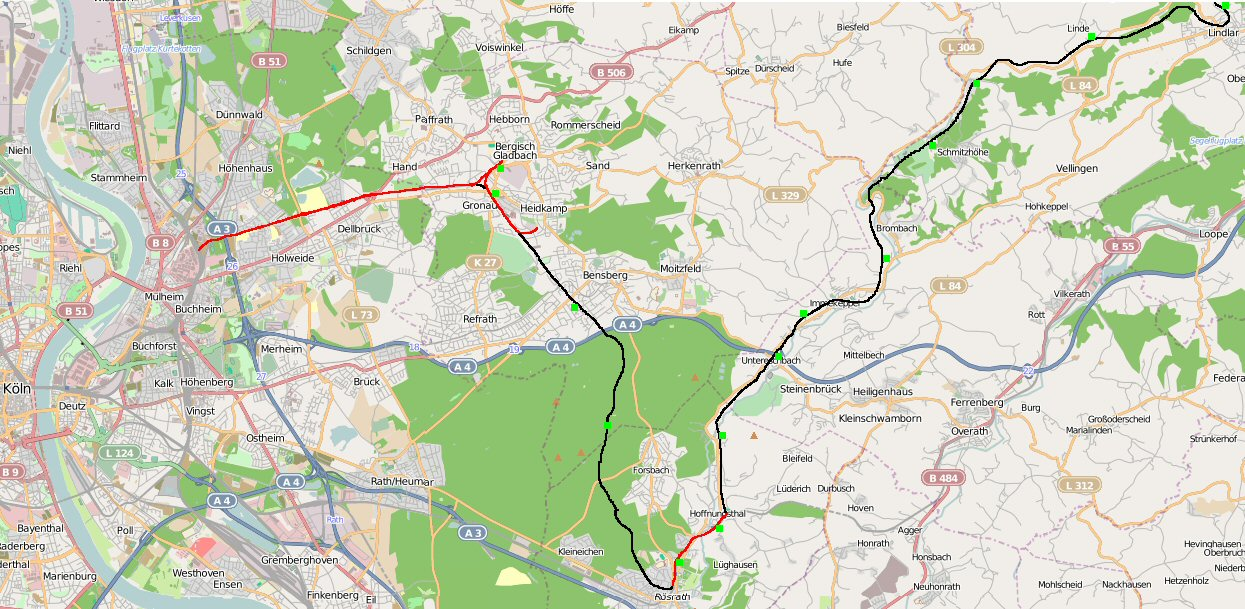

Overview
- Line number: 2663 (Köln-Mülheim–Bergisch Gladbach); 2682 (Gronau junction–Lindlar)
- Locale: North Rhine-Westphalia, Germany
- Termini: Köln-Mülheim; Lindlar

Service
- Route number: 450.11

Technical
- Line length: 44.7 km (27.8 mi)
- Number of tracks: 2 (Köln-Mülheim–Köln-Dellbrück)
- Track gauge: 1,435 mm (4 ft 8 1/2 in) standard gauge
- Electrification: 15 kV/16.7 Hz AC overhead catenary

The Cologne–Lindlar railway (also formerly known as the Sülztalbahn: "Sülz Valley Railway") is a formerly 45 km long, partly disused railway line from Mülheim via Bergisch Gladbach, Bensberg, Rösrath, Hoffnungsthal and Immekeppel to Lindlar in the German state of North Rhine-Westphalia.

S-Bahn services operate on the section between Cologne and Bergisch Gladbach, which is electrified. The remaining section was never electrified and is now largely closed, although some of it is used for freight. The section between Rösrath and Hoffnungsthal is now part of the Köln-Kalk–Overath railway.

== History ==
=== Cologne-Mülheim–Bergisch Gladbach–Bensberg section ===
The initial plans of 1863 were to build a line from Mülheim am Rhine (now Köln-Mülheim station) to Bergisch Gladbach and on to Wipperfürth. However, on December 1, 1868 the initial section was completed by the Bergisch-Märkische Railway Company to Bergisch Gladbach only.

In 1870, the track was extended to Bensberg. This section was built as a double-track line. Trains continuing from Bergisch Gladbach needed to reverse in Bergisch Gladbach station.

In 1912, a connecting curve was built in Bergisch Gladbach before the terminal station. A second station was built in Bergisch Gladbach as a through station. The second station was only used for passengers and passenger trains ran to it directly by the new curve. Freight trains ran to the terminal station, where there were several sidings connecting to surrounding factories. The Zanders paper mill was and still is connected to the curve from the freight yard to Bensberg, and not directly to the freight yard.

Since the opening of the new terminal station in central Bergisch Gladbach in the early 1950s, passenger trains have run there. For this reason, the connecting curve is no longer used and it was dismantled in the early 1960s. Nevertheless, there have been plans for some time to restore it so that container trains from the zinc works container terminal can avoid reversing in the old freight yard.

The terminal station in Bergisch Gladbach has only been used as a passenger station prior to 1912 and since September 1965. Between 1912 and 1950 it was operated exclusively as a freight yard. With the construction of the new station building in 1950, passenger trains ran again in the railway terminus, so that until 1965, two passenger stations existed: Bergisch Gladbach Stadtmitte (city centre) at the site of the old terminus station with the newly built station building and Bergisch Gladbach station, south of the railway triangle. The passenger service between Bergisch Gladbach and Bensberg was closed on September 29, 1965, which was also the end of operation to the southern station. Freight traffic between Bergisch Gladbach and Bensberg ended on May 27, 1989.

In 1974-75, the Sülz Valley Railway was electrified for the Rhine-Sieg S-Bahn (now part of the Rhine-Ruhr S-Bahn), but not all tracks in Bergisch Gladbach station were electrified. In addition, the second track was restored between Köln-Mülheim and Köln-Dellbrück; the second track had been removed between Mülheim and Bergisch Gladbach in 1945.

In 2008, a new protected level crossing was built on the freight track at the roundabout next to the station.

=== Bensberg–Immekeppel section ===
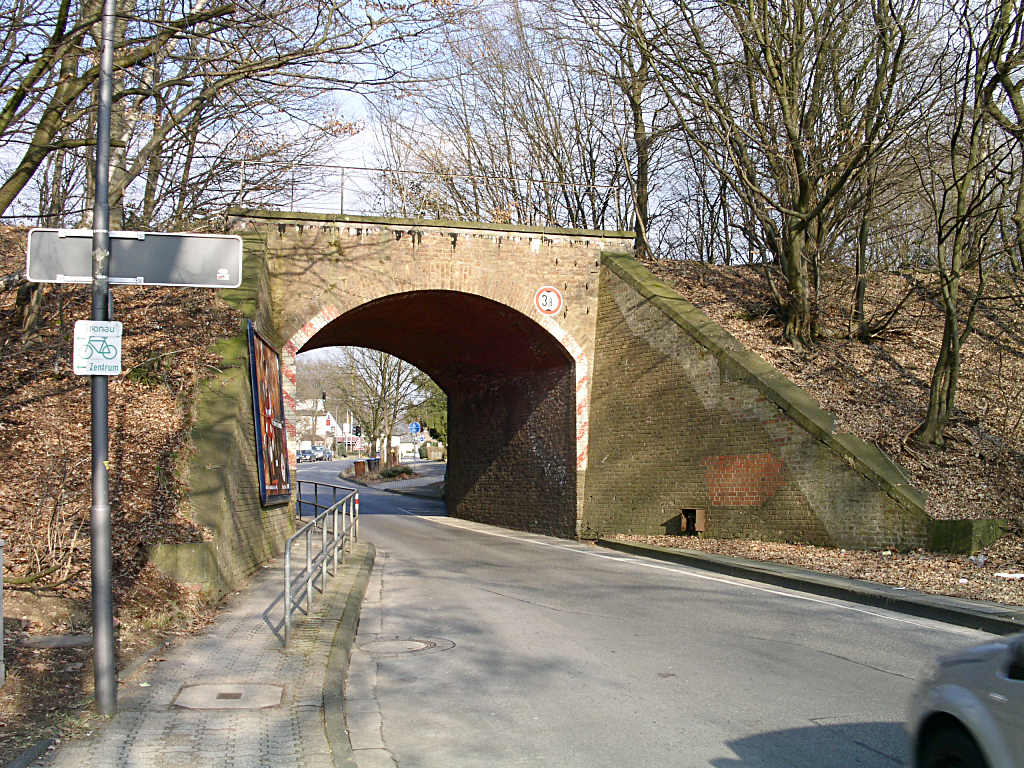
Crossing of Saaler Straße in Bensberg

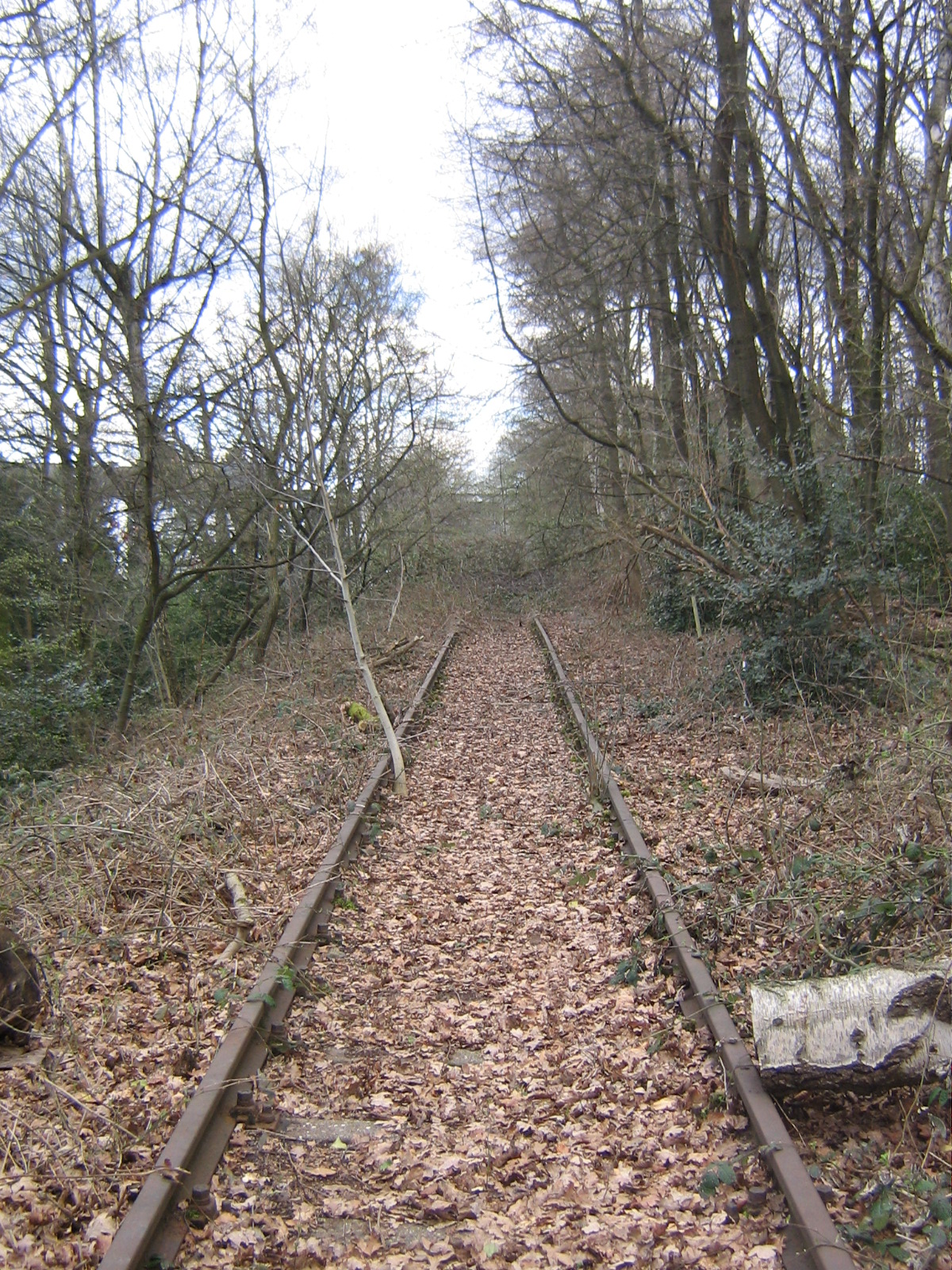
Current end of the track at kilometer 13.8, just before the former Bensberg station

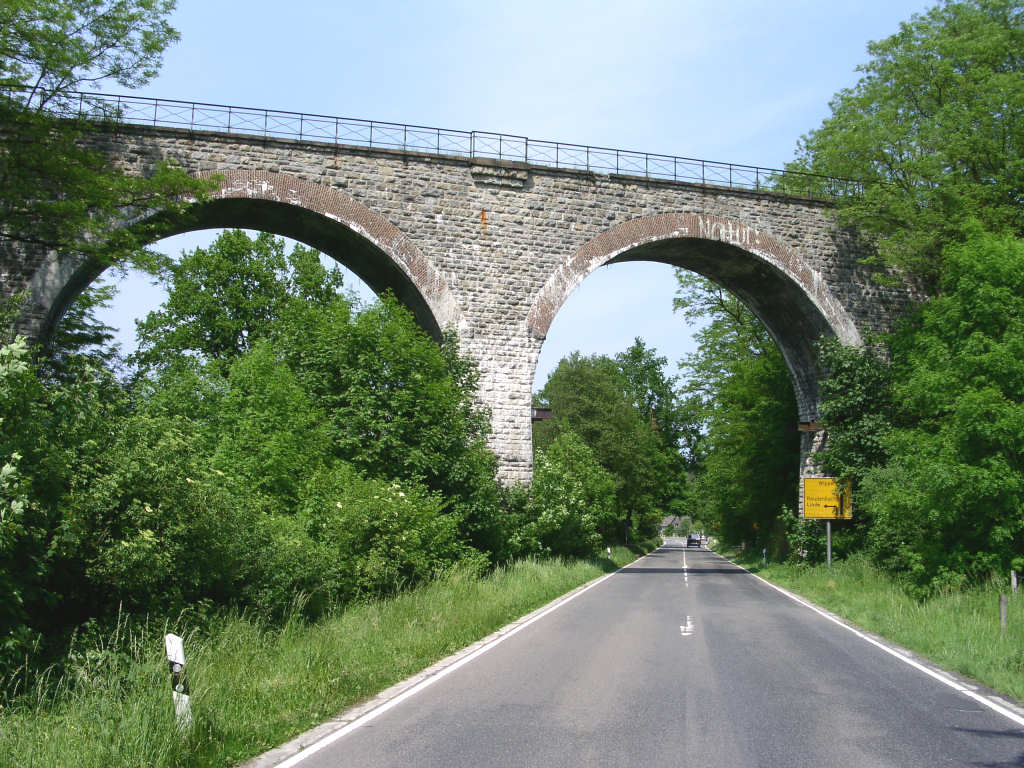
Rail bridge at Lindlar

In particular, the Gebrüder Reusch company in Hoffnungsthal, then a sheet metal manufacturer, and the Altenberg company (formally, the Rhein-Preußische Zink-, Gruben- und Hütten-Gesellschaft St. Paul de Sincay & Companie), which among other things operated a mine at Lüderich near Hoffnungsthal, were very interested in links with the rail network.

The line from Bensberg via Forsbach and Rösrath to Hoffnungsthal was opened in 1890. The line from Hoffnungsthal to Immekeppel was opened in 1891. This was a single-track line.

Initial attempts to establish a line through the Sülz Valley in 1873 failed, as the ministry rejected the new route. In 1883, a narrow gauge (metre gauge) railway was planned from Kalk via Rath, Rösrath and Volberg to Immekeppel. The project ultimately failed because the Prussian Ministry of Public Works refused to provide the estimated funding required amounting to 830,000 marks.

In 1937, a secret three kilometre branch line was built from near Bensberg station for the transport of ammunition to Ostheim air base.

=== Immekeppel–Lindlar section ===
The continuation of the line to Lindlar was mainly built to connect with the Lindlar quarry and mining operations, since their freight at that time had to be taken to Engelskirchen stations or Kaiserau on the narrow-gauge Leppe Valley Railway.

In 1897, the council of the Lindlar municipality formed a committee that dealt with the proposed railway, but all attempts to establish a railway failed at first. It was not until 1906 that a standard gauge railway from Immekeppel to Lindlar was approved by the government, so that construction of the line started in 1909 and it was opened in 1912. The plan provided for four stations: Obersteeg, Tüscher, Linde and Lindlar. There was controversy over the naming of Tüscher station. Finally in 1911 the name was changed to Hommerich. The Immekeppel–Hommerich section was opened to traffic in January 1912 and the line from Hommerich to Lindlar was officially opened on December 9, 1912.

Before the First World War, an extension of the line was planned via Hartegasse, Frielingsdorf and Dohrgauler to Wipperfürth. This plan was never carried because of the outbreak of the war. Finally in 1927 the plan of the Lindlar–Wipperfürth line was dropped in favour of a direct line from Bergisch Gladbach to Wipperfurth. But this line was also never built. Therefore, Lindlar station remained a "sack station," which became less important and ultimately contributed to the closure of the line.

By the late 1950s, a bus line was established along the railway. In 1960, the last passenger train ran between Hoffnungsthal and Lindlar, freight traffic and continued until 1966. In the same year the section was dismantled.

== Operations ==
The line from Cologne-Mülheim to Bergisch Gladbach is operated on working days at 20-minute intervals and on weekends at 30-minute intervals as S-Bahn line S 11, using modern class 423 electric multiple units.

Since the closure of the section of the Sülz Valley Railway between Bergisch Gladbach and Lindlar, the section between Rösrath and Hoffnungsthal has operated as part of the Agger Valley Railway and is served by Oberbergische Bahn trains at 30-minute intervals.

The line from Bergisch Gladbach station towards Bensberg to the zinc smelter is still open and on weekdays trains operate to the container terminal of Häfen und Güterverkehr Köln (Cologne port and rail freight) on Senefelderstraße.
