= Mülheim, Cologne =

Mülheim (9)
- Borough of Cologne
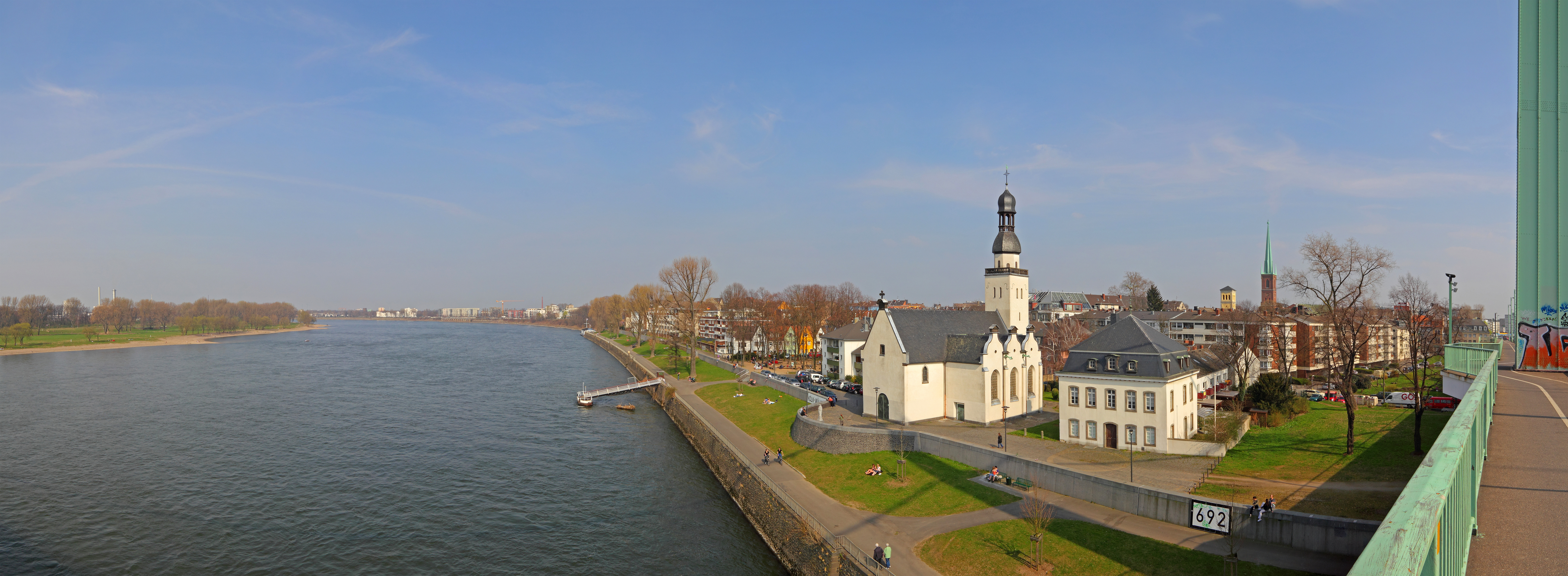
- Panoramic view of Mülheim as seen from Mülheimer Brücke

- Coat of arms

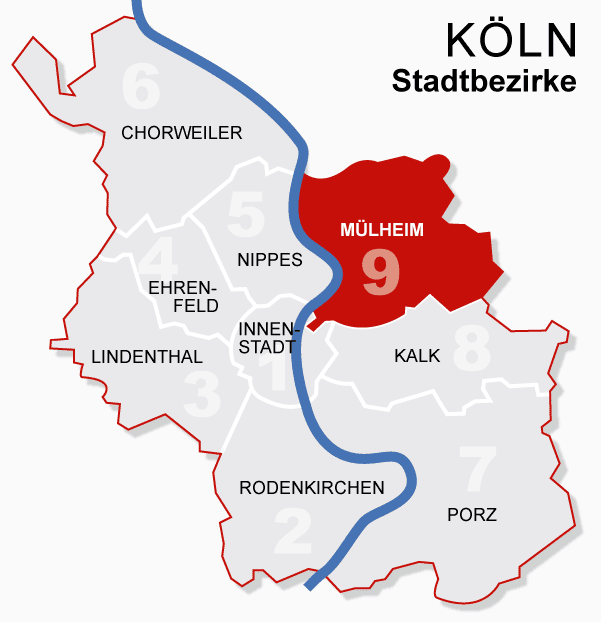
- Location within Cologne
- Interactive map of Mülheim (9)
- Location within Germany Location within North Rhine-Westphalia
- Coordinates: 50°58′N 7°01′E
- Country: Germany
- State: North Rhine-Westphalia
- Admin. region: Cologne
- District: Urban district
- City: Cologne

Area
  - Total: 52.20 km^{2} (20.15 sq mi)

Population (2020-12-31)
  - Total: 148,956
  - Density: 2,854/km^{2} (7,391/sq mi)
- Time zone: UTC+01:00 (CET)
  - Summer (DST): UTC+02:00 (CEST)

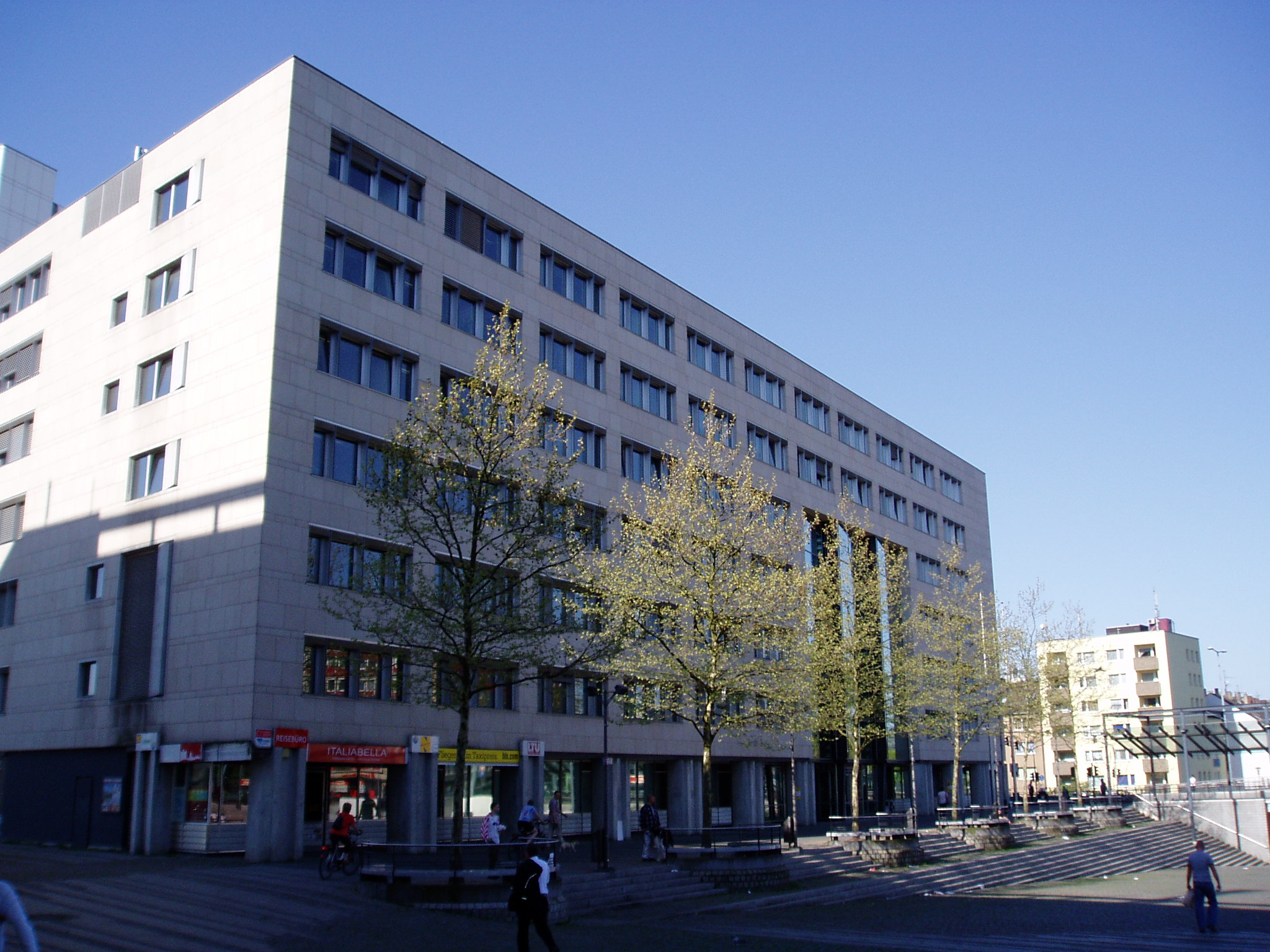
District town hall

Mülheim (German: Köln-Mülheim [ˈmyːlhaɪm]; Kölsch: Möllem [ˈmø̂ləm]) is a borough (Stadtbezirk) of Cologne in Germany and a formerly independent town (Mülheim am Rhein). Mülheim is located on the right bank of the Rhine opposite the old town of Cologne.

The district borders Leverkusen to the north, Bergisch Gladbach to the east, the Cologne districts of Kalk and Innenstadt to the south. The river Rhine lies west of Mülheim, on the other riverbank lies the Cologne borough of Nippes.

The district is ethnically diverse, with a significant Turkish population.

== History ==
The place was first mentioned (as Mulenheym) in 1098 and became a town in 1322; it belonged to the County of Berg. In April 1914, Mülheim was incorporated into Cologne.

== Subdivisions ==
Mülheim consists of nine Stadtteile (city parts):

#	City part	Population (2020)	Area (km^{2})	Pop. per km^{2}	map
901	Mülheim	42,441	7.07	6,034	District map of Mülheim
902	Buchforst	7,431	0.83	8,976	District map of Mülheim
903	Buchheim	12,750	2.85	4,482	District map of Mülheim
904	Holweide	20,871	4.11	5,099	District map of Mülheim
905	Dellbrück	21,801	9.95	2,202	District map of Mülheim
906	Höhenhaus	15,708	5.07	3,103	District map of Mülheim
907	Dünnwald	11,583	10.84	1,072	District map of Mülheim
908	Stammheim	8,332	3.74	2,234	District map of Mülheim
909	Flittard	8,039	7.74	1,043	District map of Mülheim
source: Kölner Stadtteilinformationen 2020

== Transportation ==
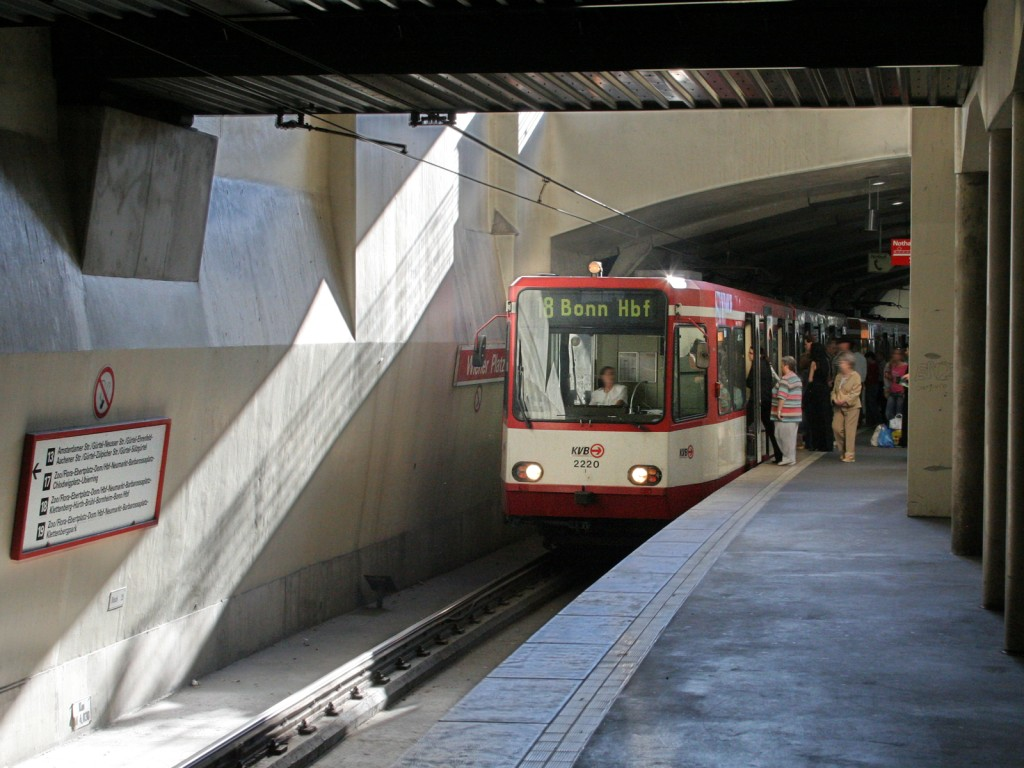
Train of KVB line 18 to Bonn arriving in Wiener Platz station

Mülheim is served by numerous railway stations and highway. Train stations include Köln-Mülheim, Köln-Buchforst, Köln-Dellbrück and Köln-Stammheim, as well as numerous light rail stations of Cologne Stadtbahn line 3, 4, 13 and 18. Bundesautobahn 3 passes through Dellbrück and Dünnwald, as part of the Cologne Beltway.

=== Rhine bridges ===
- B 51 Mülheimer Brücke

== Localities ==
- Cologne Mülheim Protestant Cemetery

== Notable people ==
- Adam Adami, Roman Catholic diplomat and priest (1610–1663)
- Abraham Roentgen, cabinet maker (1711–1793)
- Herbert Eulenberg, poet and author (1876–1949)
- Catharina Josepha Pratten, guitarist and composer (1821–1895)
- Johann Bendel, rector and historian (1863–1947)
- Peter Kürten, serial killer (1883–1931)
- Willi Ostermann, singer and poet (1876–1936)
- Adolf Rodewyk, Jesuit and exorcist (1894–1989)
- Rainer Woelki, Archbishop of Cologne (*1956)
