= German railway station categories =

Denote service levels of each station

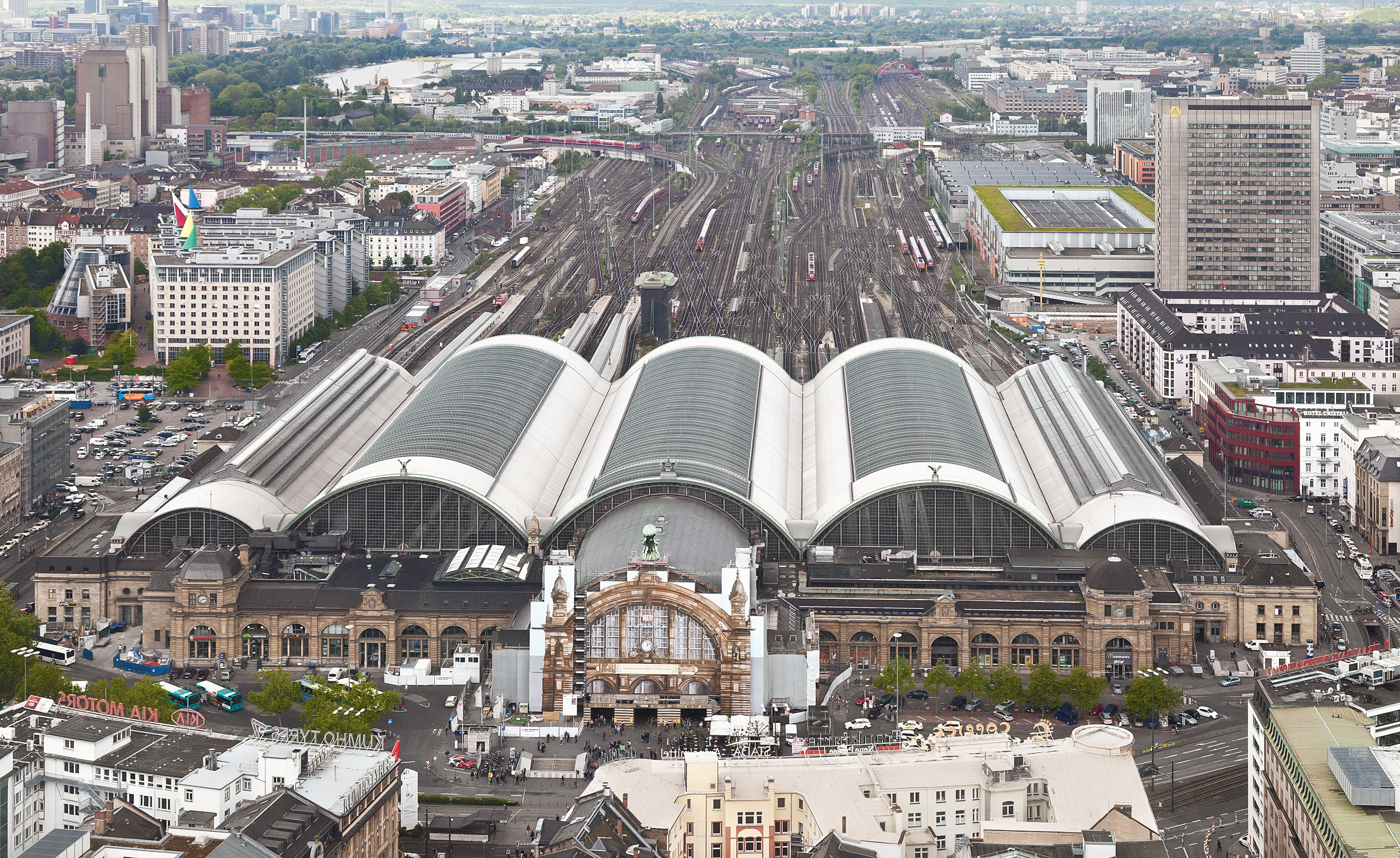
Frankfurt (Main) Hauptbahnhof (category 1)

The approximately 5,400 railway stations in Germany that are owned and operated by the Deutsche Bahn subsidiary DB InfraGO are divided into seven categories, denoting the service level available at the station.

This categorisation influences the amount of money railway companies need to pay to DB Station&Service for using the facilities at the stations.

== Categories ==
=== Category 1 ===
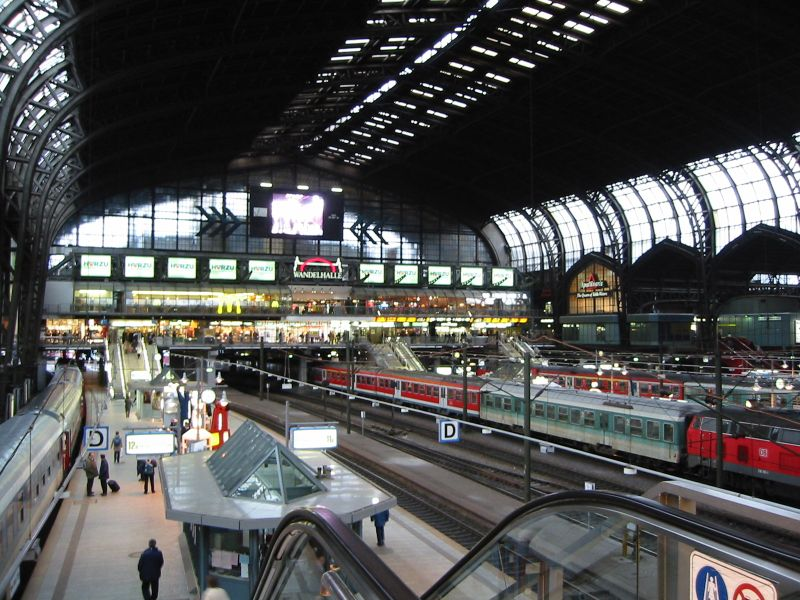
Hamburg Hauptbahnhof (category 1)

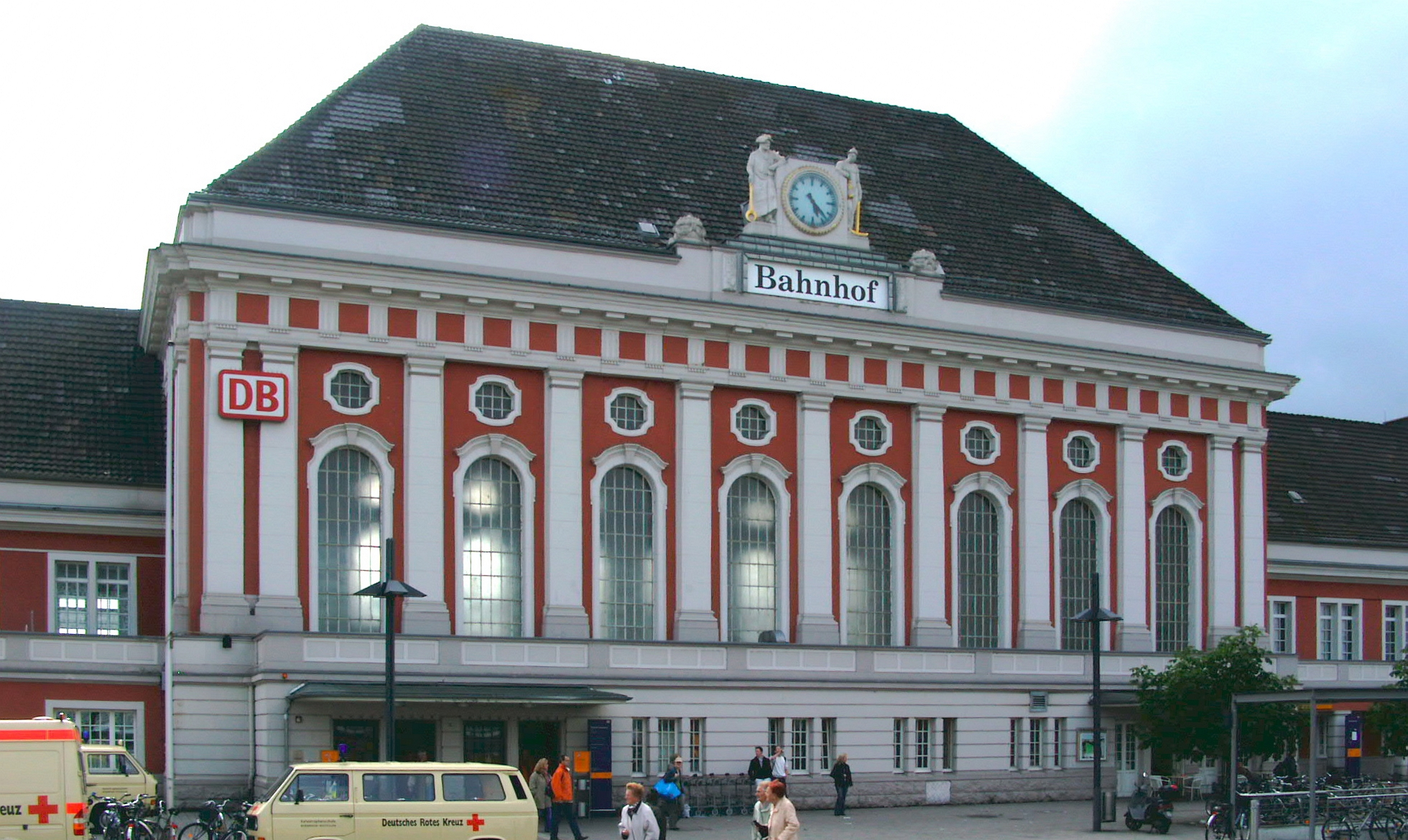
Hamm (Westf) (category 2)

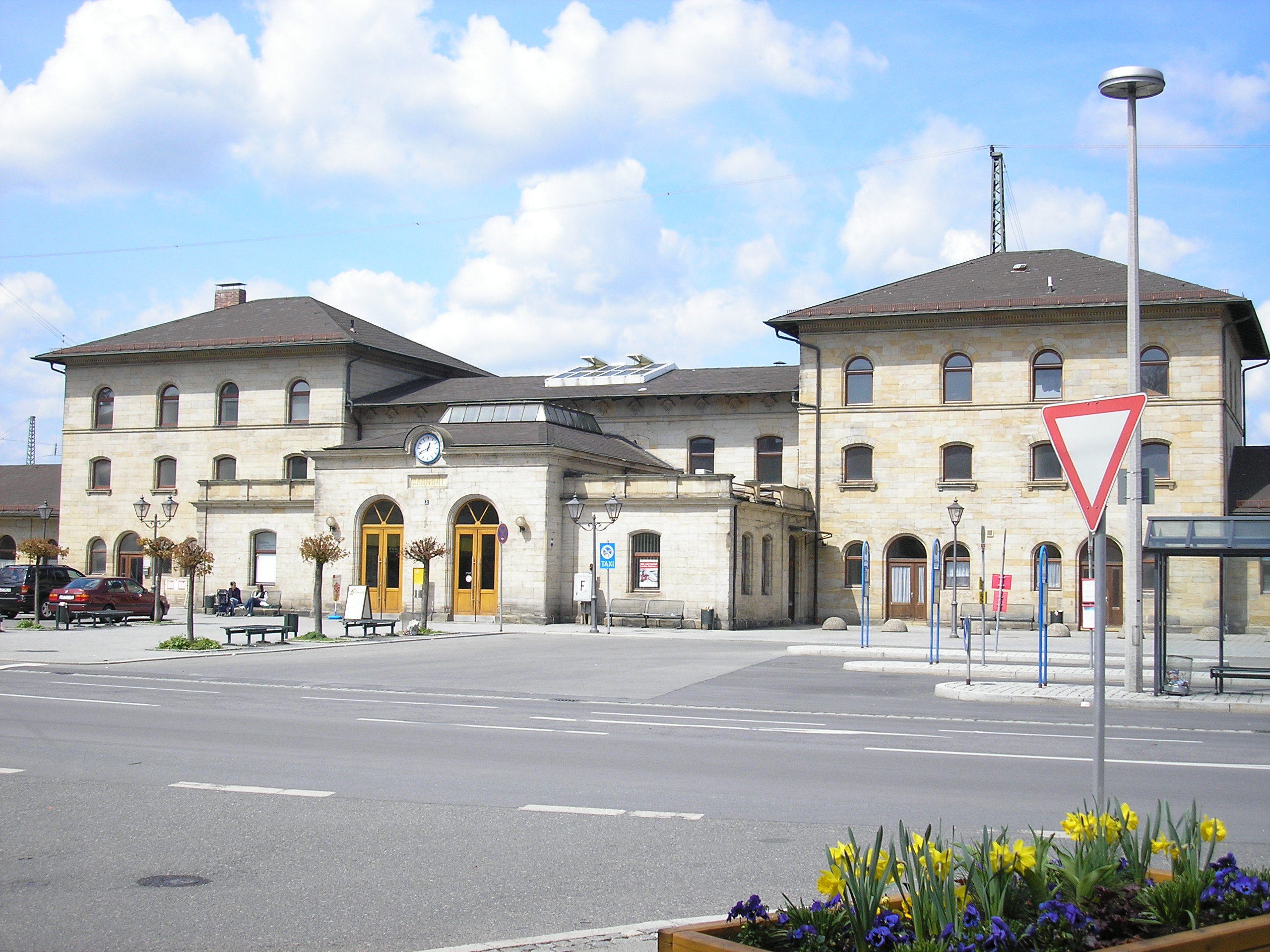
Lichtenfels (category 3)

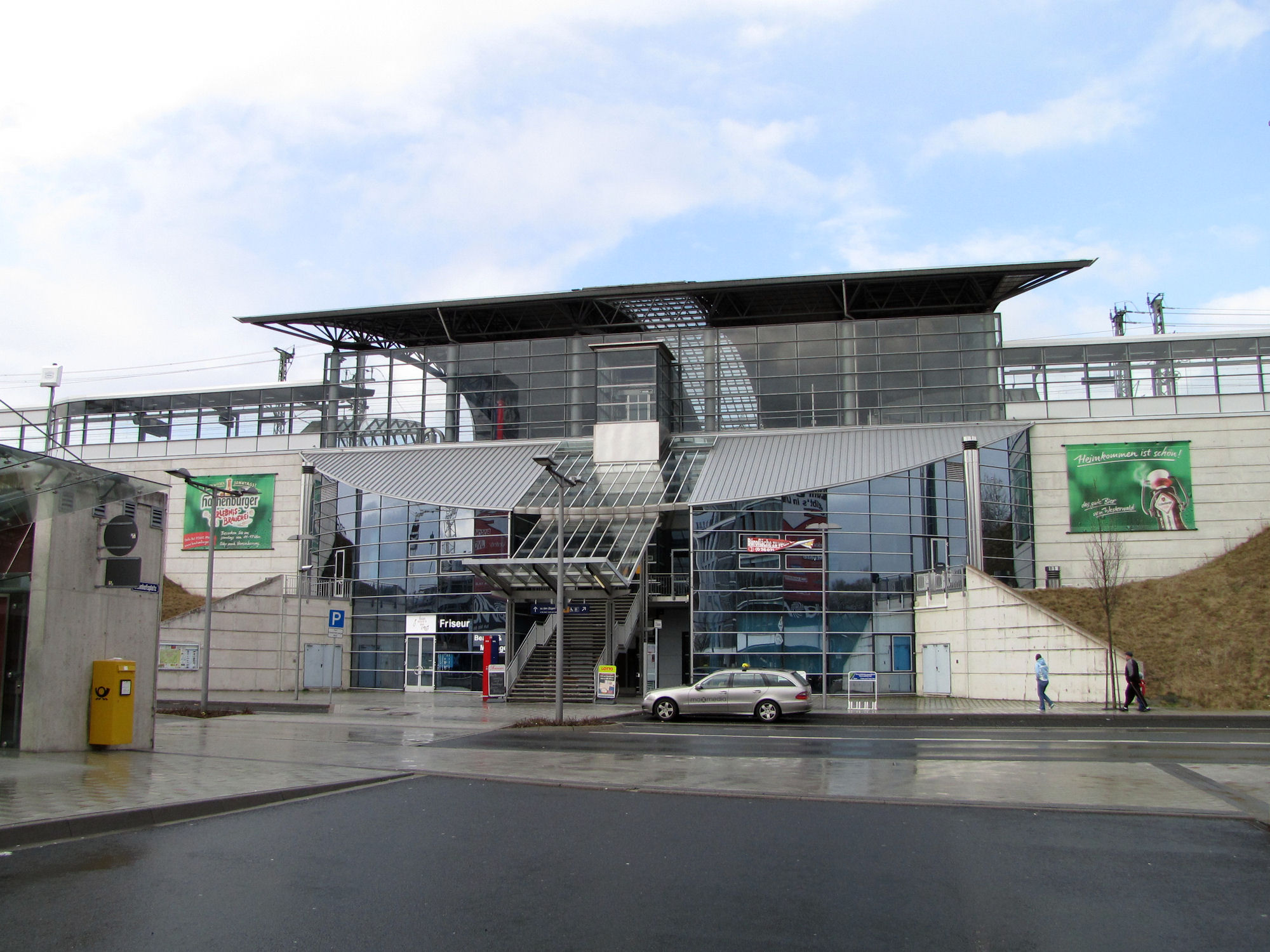
Montabaur (category 4)

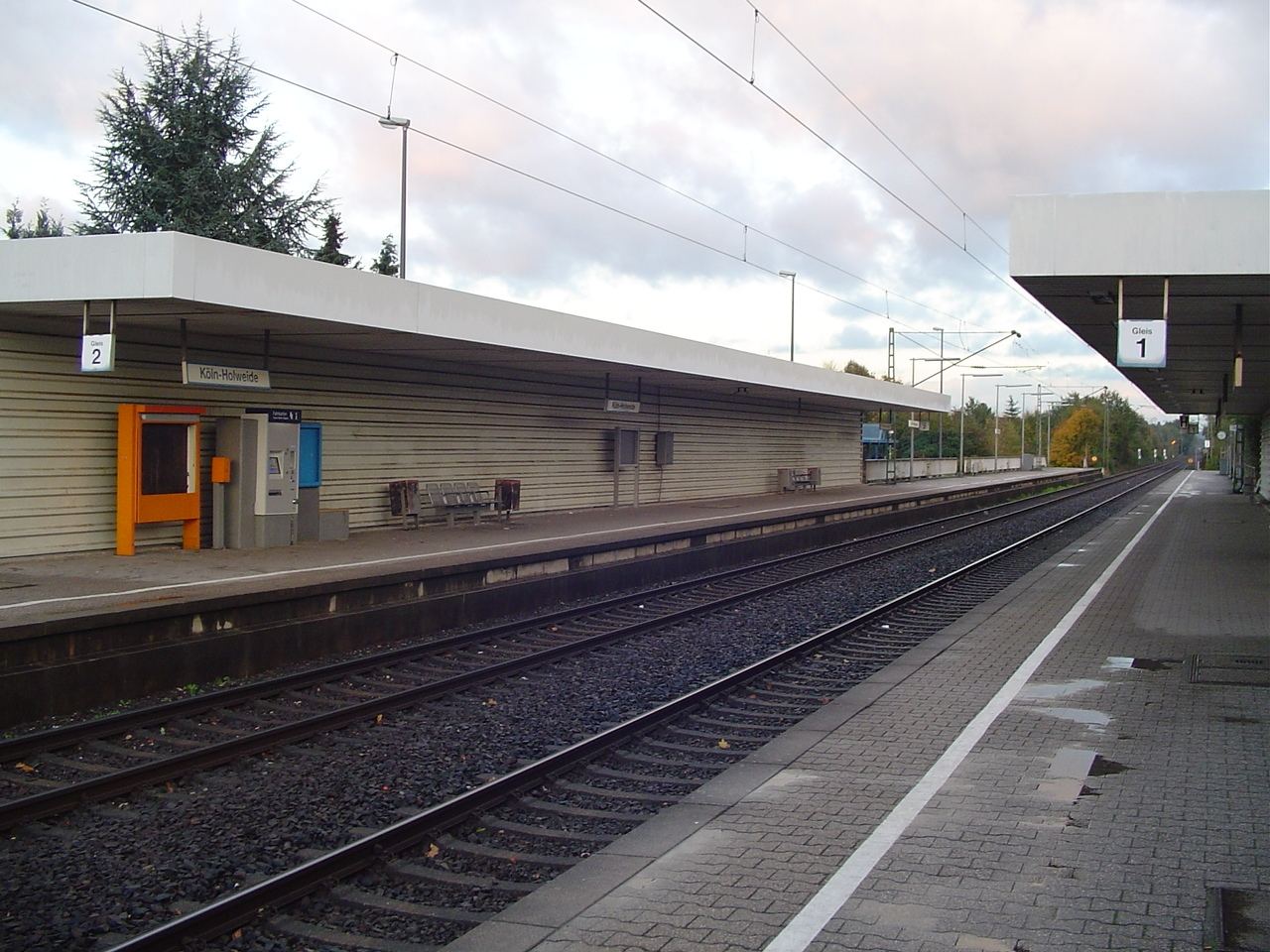
Köln-Holweide (category 5)

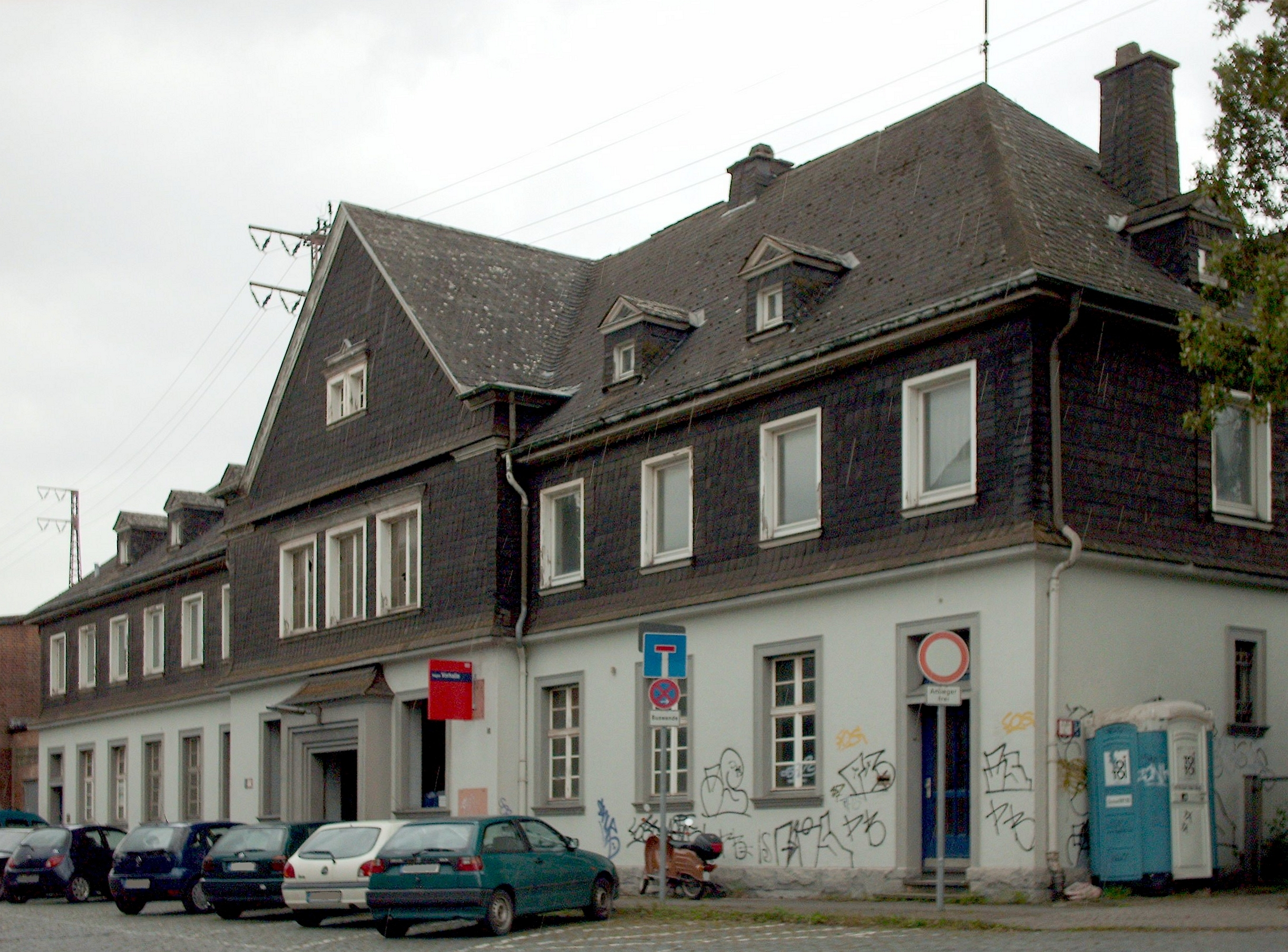
Hagen-Vorhalle (category 6)

The 21 stations in Category 1 are considered traffic hubs. They are permanently staffed and carry all sorts of railway-related facilities, as well as usually featuring a shopping mall in the station. Many are the main station (German: Hauptbahnhof or Hbf) of larger cities. However, some are located in smaller cities, such as Karlsruhe Hauptbahnhof, and are regarded as important because they are at the junction of important railway lines. Berlin, Hamburg, Munich and Cologne, the four biggest cities in Germany, have more than one Category 1 station.

Included in this category are the following stations:

- Berlin-Gesundbrunnen station
- Berlin Hauptbahnhof
- Berlin Ostbahnhof
- Berlin Südkreuz
- Dortmund Hauptbahnhof
- Dresden Hauptbahnhof
- Duisburg Hauptbahnhof
- Düsseldorf Hauptbahnhof
- Essen Hauptbahnhof
- Frankfurt Hauptbahnhof
- Hamburg-Altona station
- Hamburg Hauptbahnhof
- Hannover Hauptbahnhof
- Karlsruhe Hauptbahnhof
- Köln Hauptbahnhof
- Köln Messe/Deutz station
- Leipzig Hauptbahnhof
- München Hauptbahnhof
- München Ostbahnhof
- Nürnberg Hauptbahnhof
- Stuttgart Hauptbahnhof

=== Category 2 ===
Most of the 87-odd stations in Category 2 are either important junctions for long-distance traffic or offer connections to large airports. InterCity and EuroCity trains generally call at these stations. All railway-related services, like a ticket hall and a service desk, are present at the station and the station is staffed at most times trains are running. The service is similar to Category 1 stations.

Category 2 stations, by state, are:

- Baden-Württemberg (12): Bietigheim-Bissingen, Bruchsal, Freiburg (Brsg) Hbf, Heidelberg Hbf, Heilbronn Hbf, Mannheim Hbf, Offenburg, Plochingen, Pforzheim Hbf, Singen, Tübingen Hbf, Ulm Hbf
- Bavaria (10): Aschaffenburg Hbf, Augsburg Hbf, Bamberg, Fürth Hbf, Ingolstadt Hbf, Landshut (Bayern) Hbf, München-Pasing, Regensburg Hbf, Rosenheim, Würzburg Hbf
- Berlin (6): Friedrichstraße, Lichtenberg, Potsdamer Platz, Spandau, Wannsee, Zoologischer Garten
- Brandenburg (4): BER Airport – Terminal 1-2, Cottbus, Frankfurt (Oder), Potsdam Hbf
- Bremen (1): Bremen Hbf
- Hamburg (2): Hamburg Dammtor, Hamburg-Harburg
- Hesse (8): Darmstadt Hbf, Frankfurt (Main) Süd, Fulda, Gießen, Hanau Hbf, Kassel-Wilhelmshöhe, Kassel Hbf, Wiesbaden Hbf
- Lower Saxony (8): Braunschweig Hbf, Göttingen, Hildesheim Hbf, Lüneburg, Oldenburg Hbf, Osnabrück Hbf, Uelzen, Wolfsburg Hbf
- Mecklenburg-Vorpommern (1): Rostock Hbf
- North Rhine-Westphalia (17): Aachen Hbf, Bielefeld Hbf, Bochum Hbf, Bonn Hbf, Düsseldorf Flughafen, Gelsenkirchen Hbf, Düren (except for Sundays; being to operate only regional trains or commuter traffic), Hagen Hbf, Hamm (Westf), Herford, Mönchengladbach Hbf, Münster (Westf) Hbf, Neuss Hbf, Oberhausen Hbf, Paderborn Hbf, Rheine, Solingen Hbf, Wuppertal Hbf
- Rhineland-Palatinate (7): Kaiserslautern Hbf, Koblenz Hbf, Ludwigshafen Hbf, Mainz Hbf, Neustadt (Weinstraße) Hbf, Trier Hbf, Worms Hbf
- Saarland (1): Saarbrücken Hbf
- Saxony (2): Chemnitz Hbf, Dresden-Neustadt
- Saxony-Anhalt (2): Halle (Saale) Hbf, Magdeburg Hbf
- Schleswig-Holstein (4): Bad Oldesloe, Kiel Hbf, Lübeck Hbf, Neumünster
- Thuringia (1): Erfurt Hbf

=== Category 3 ===
There are 239 Category 3 stations. These stations usually feature a hall where travellers can buy tickets and groceries, but they are not permanently staffed. Often they serve as main stations of towns with about 50,000 inhabitants.

Examples include Görlitz station, Reutlingen, Lichtenfels, Passau Hbf and Mülheim (Ruhr) Hbf.

=== Category 4 ===
Category 4 includes around 630 stations. Most of these stations have frequent connections with RegionalExpress and RegionalBahn trains. Their service level is comparable to a bus station and they offer services to commuters. This category also includes stations situated in major cities that see a high usage of S-Bahn or RE/RB services.

Examples include Balingen, Bautzen, Montabaur, Coburg and Munich's S-Bahn stop Isartor.

=== Category 5 ===
Category 5 stations (1070) either belong to smaller, rural towns or to outlying suburban areas of major cities. Their inventory is frequently "vandal-proofed" due to their lower passenger numbers. Normally, only local trains call at these stations.

Examples include Sigmaringen, Köln-Holweide and Bremerhaven-Lehe.

=== Category 6 ===
Category 6 includes over 2500 stations, with low passenger numbers. Only the most basic equipment needed is present at the station.

Examples of stations in this category include Bad Wimpfen, Loxstedt and Hagen-Vorhalle.

=== Category 7 ===
Most of the 870 stations in Category 7, the lowest category, are in rural areas. These stops, which usually have no more than one platform, are served by certain local trains only. Examples of stations belonging to this category include Eggesin and Beuron.

== See also ==
- Railway station types in Germany
- List of Deutsche Bahn station codes
