= Neuss Allerheiligen station =

Railway station in Germany

Neuss Allerheiligen
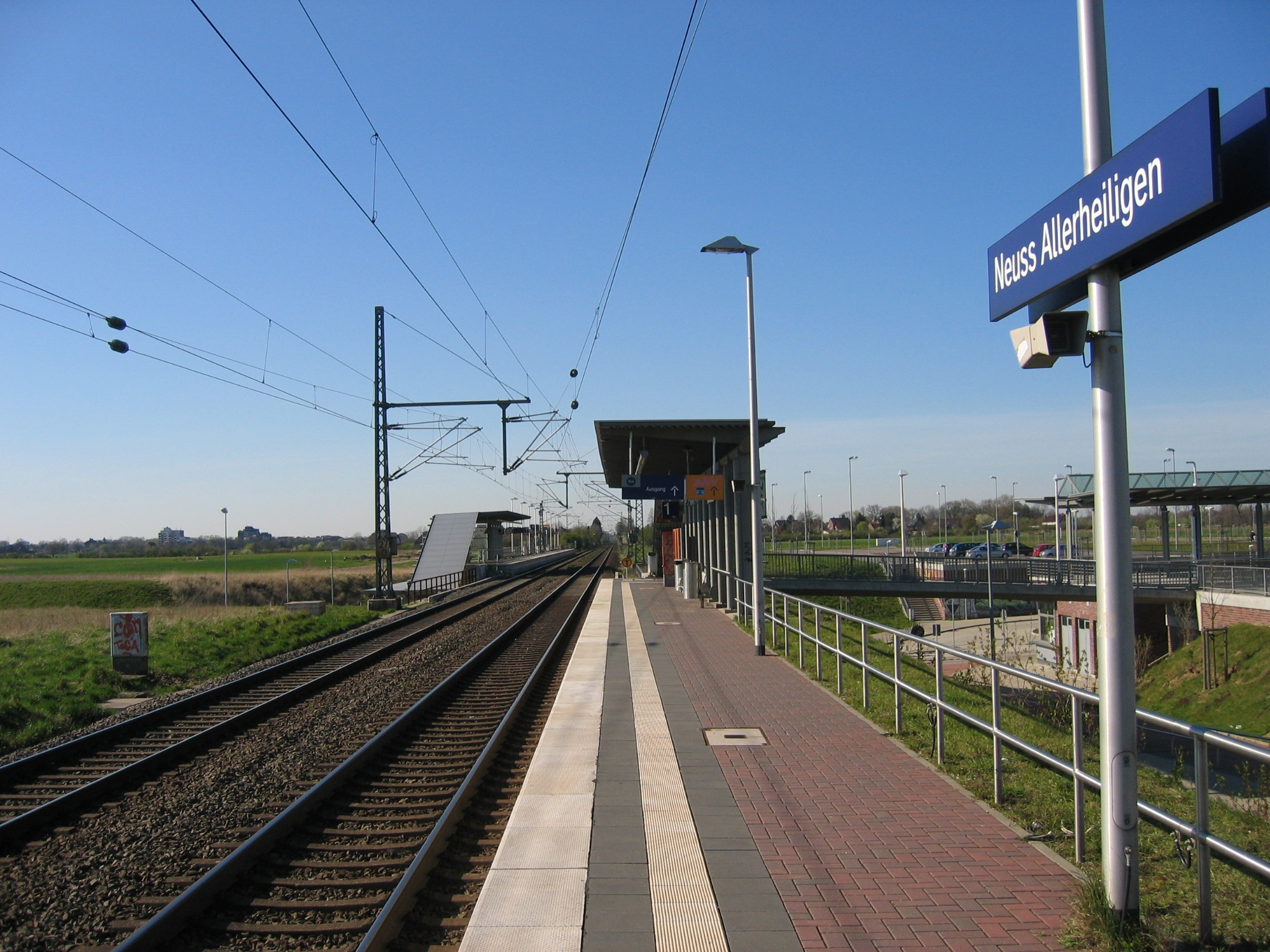

General information
- Location: Am Pickenhof 1 Neuss, North Rhine-Westphalia; Germany
- Coordinates: 51°08′32″N 6°45′25″E
- Lines: Lower Left Rhine Railway (KBS 450.11)
- Platforms: 2

Construction
- Accessible: Yes

Other information
- Station code: 7656
- DS100 code: KNAL
- Category: 6
- Fare zone: VRR: 522; VRS: 1520 (VRR transitional tariff)
- Website: www.bahnhof.de

History
- Opened: 14 December 2003

Services
| Preceding station | Cologne S-Bahn | Following station |
|---|---|---|
| Norf towards Düsseldorf Airport Terminal | S11 | Nievenheim towards Bergisch Gladbach |
Location

Neuss Allerheiligen station is a station in the city of Neuss in the German state of North Rhine-Westphalia. It is on the Lower Left Rhine Railway and it is classified by Deutsche Bahn as a category 6 station. The station was opened on 14 December 2003.

The station is served by line S 11 of the Cologne S-Bahn, running between Düsseldorf Airport and Bergisch Gladbach every 20 minutes during the day.

It is also served by bus route 850, 841 and SB53 operated by Stadtwerke Neuss.
