= Neuss Süd station =

Railway station in Neuss, Germany

Neuss Süd
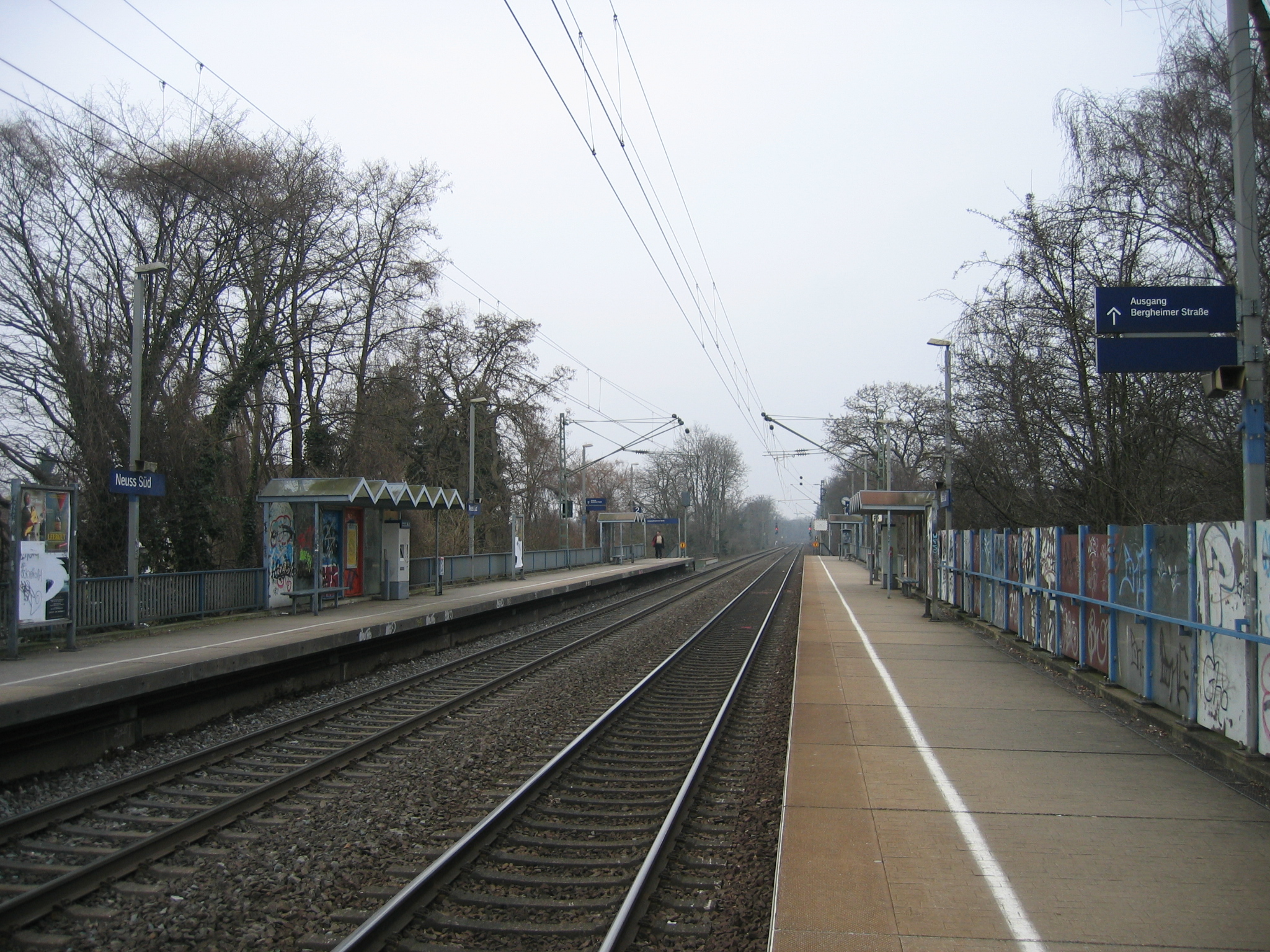
- Neuss Süd station in 2008

General information
- Location: Hölderlinstr. 17, 41464 Neuss Süd; Neuss, NRW; Germany
- Coordinates: 51°11′09″N 6°41′25″E

Construction
- Accessible: Yes

Other information
- Station code: 4442
- DS100 code: KNSD
- Category: 6
- Fare zone: VRR: 520; VRS: 1520 (VRR transitional zone)
- Website: www.bahnhof.de

History
- Opened: 28 May 1989

Services
Preceding station	Cologne S-Bahn	Following station
Neuss Hbf towards Düsseldorf Airport Terminal	S11	Norf towards Bergisch Gladbach
Location

Neuss Süd is a railway station situated in Neuss in western Germany. It is served by line S11 of the Cologne S-Bahn at 20-minute intervals from Monday to Friday and at 30-minute intervals on the weekend.
