= Norf station =

Railway station in Neuss, Germany

Norf
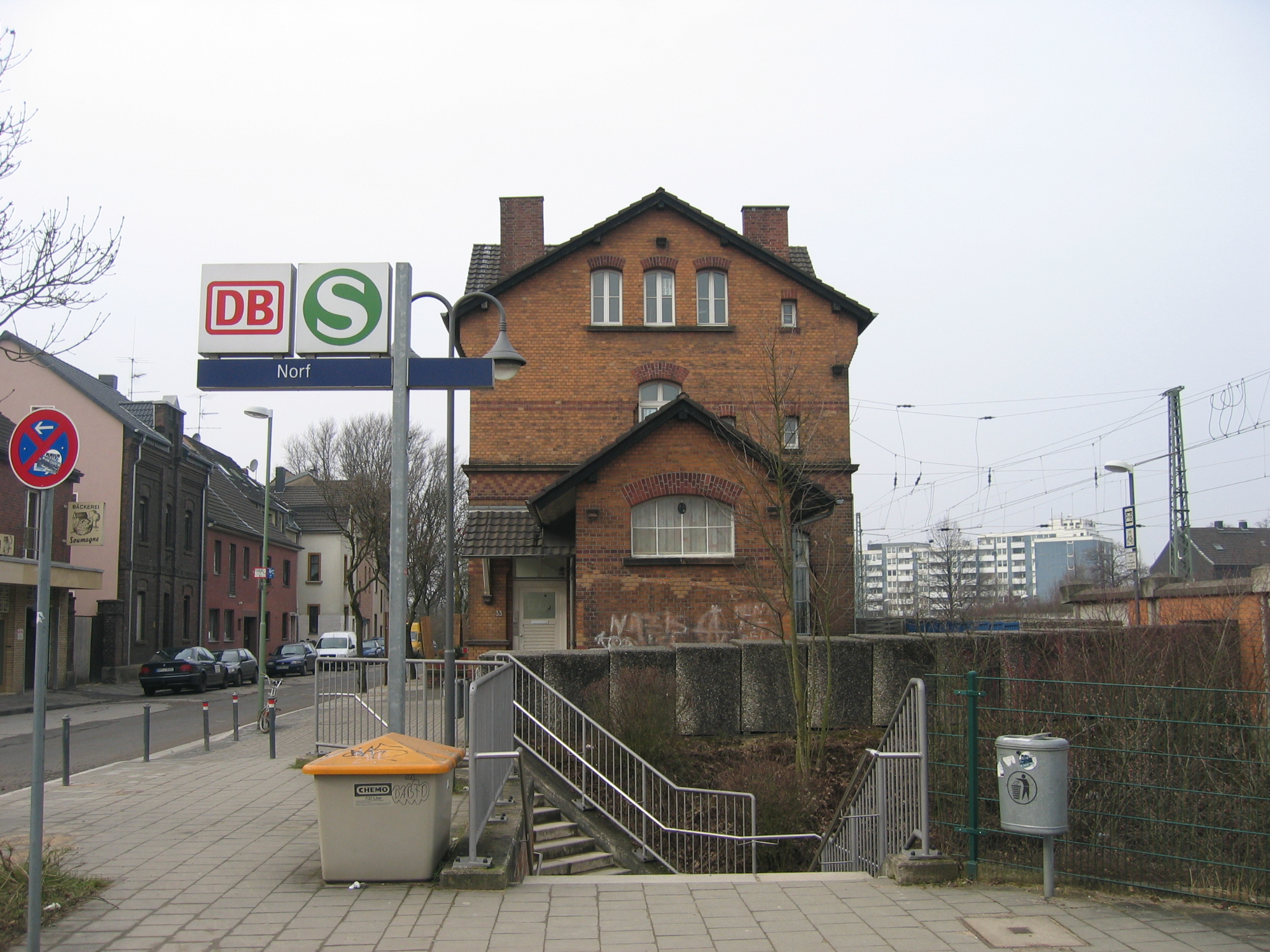

General information
- Location: Bahnstr. 28, Neuss, NRW; Germany
- Coordinates: 51°09′40″N 6°43′49″E
- Lines: Lower Left Rhine Railway (KBS 450.11)
- Platforms: 3

Construction
- Accessible: Yes

Other information
- Station code: 4583
- DS100 code: KNO
- IBNR: 8004462
- Category: 5
- Fare zone: VRR: 522; VRS: 1520 (VRR transitional tariff)
- Website: www.bahnhof.de

History
- Opened: 15 November 1855

Services
Preceding station	Cologne S-Bahn	Following station
Neuss Süd towards Düsseldorf Airport Terminal	S11	Neuss Allerheiligen towards Bergisch Gladbach
Location

Norf station is a station in the city of Neuss in the German state of North Rhine-Westphalia. It is on the Lower Left Rhine Railway and it is classified by Deutsche Bahn as a category 5 station. The station is located between the Neuss districts of Norf and Derikum. It serves the southern suburbs of Neuss, including Gnadental, Erftal, Grimlinghausen and Üdesheim.

The station opened on 15 November 1855 of the Lower Left Rhine Railway. After the integration of the town of Norf into the city of Neuss, its name was retained and it not renamed Neuss-Norf, as would normally be expected in Germany. Since 1985, Norf station has been served by line S 11 of the Cologne S-Bahn.

The station is served by line S 11, running between Düsseldorf Airport and Bergisch Gladbach every 20 minutes during the day.

It is also served by bus route 827, operated by Rheinbahn at 20- to 60-minute intervals, and two bus routes operated by Stadtwerke Neuss, 841, running at 20- to 30-minute intervals and, 852, running at 30-minute intervals.
