= Cologne =

Largest city in North Rhine-Westphalia, Germany

Cologne Köln (German) Kölle (Kölsch)
- City
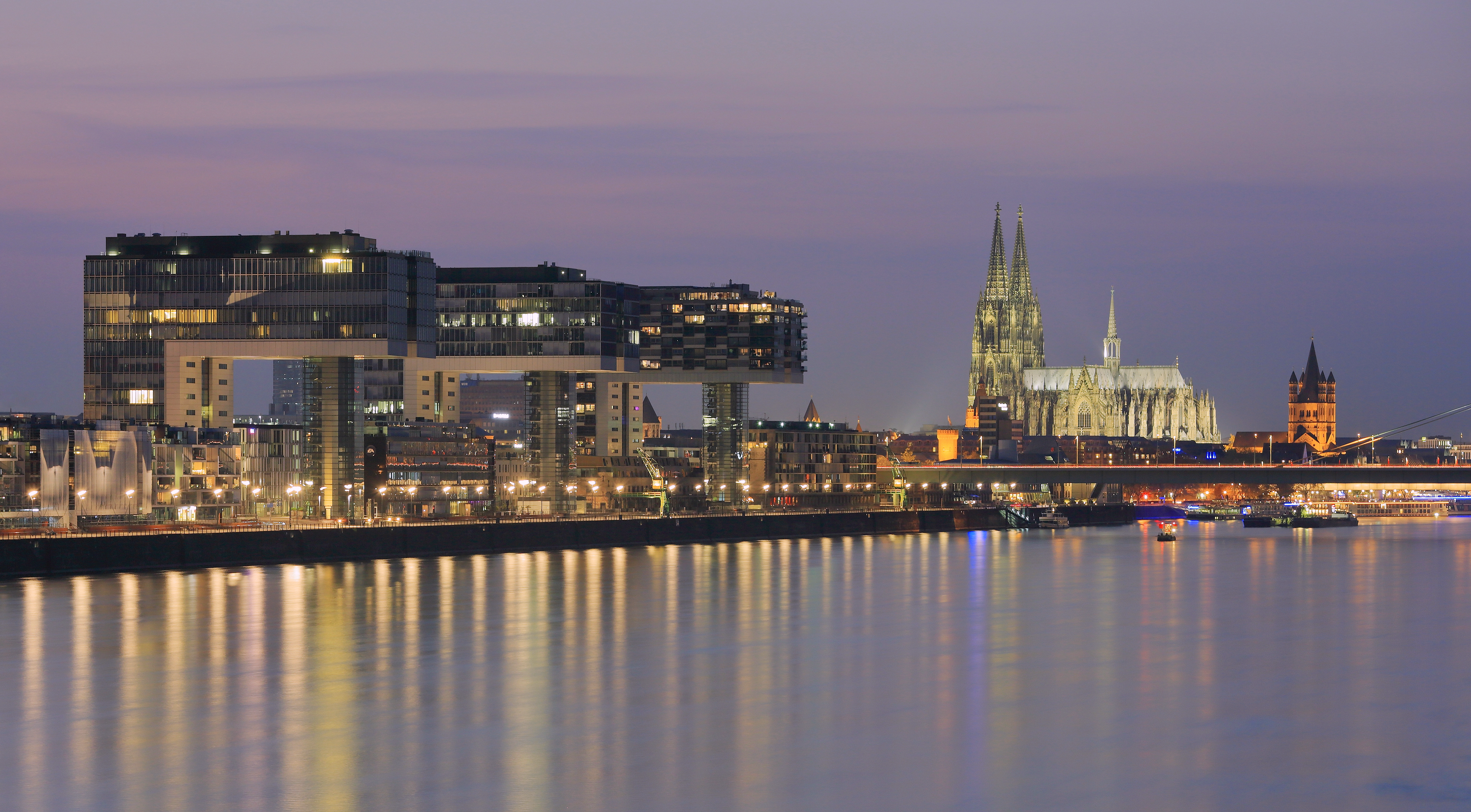
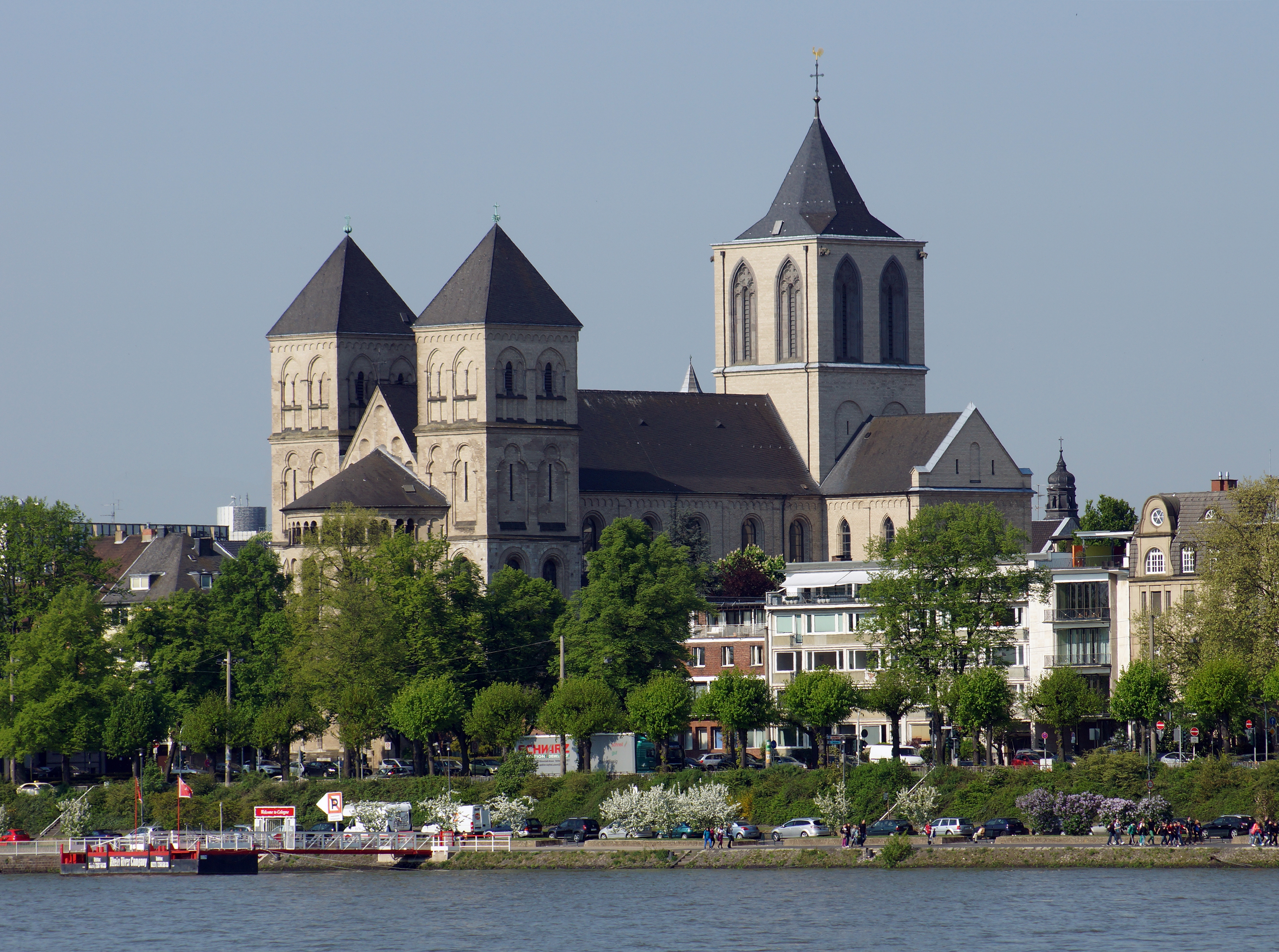
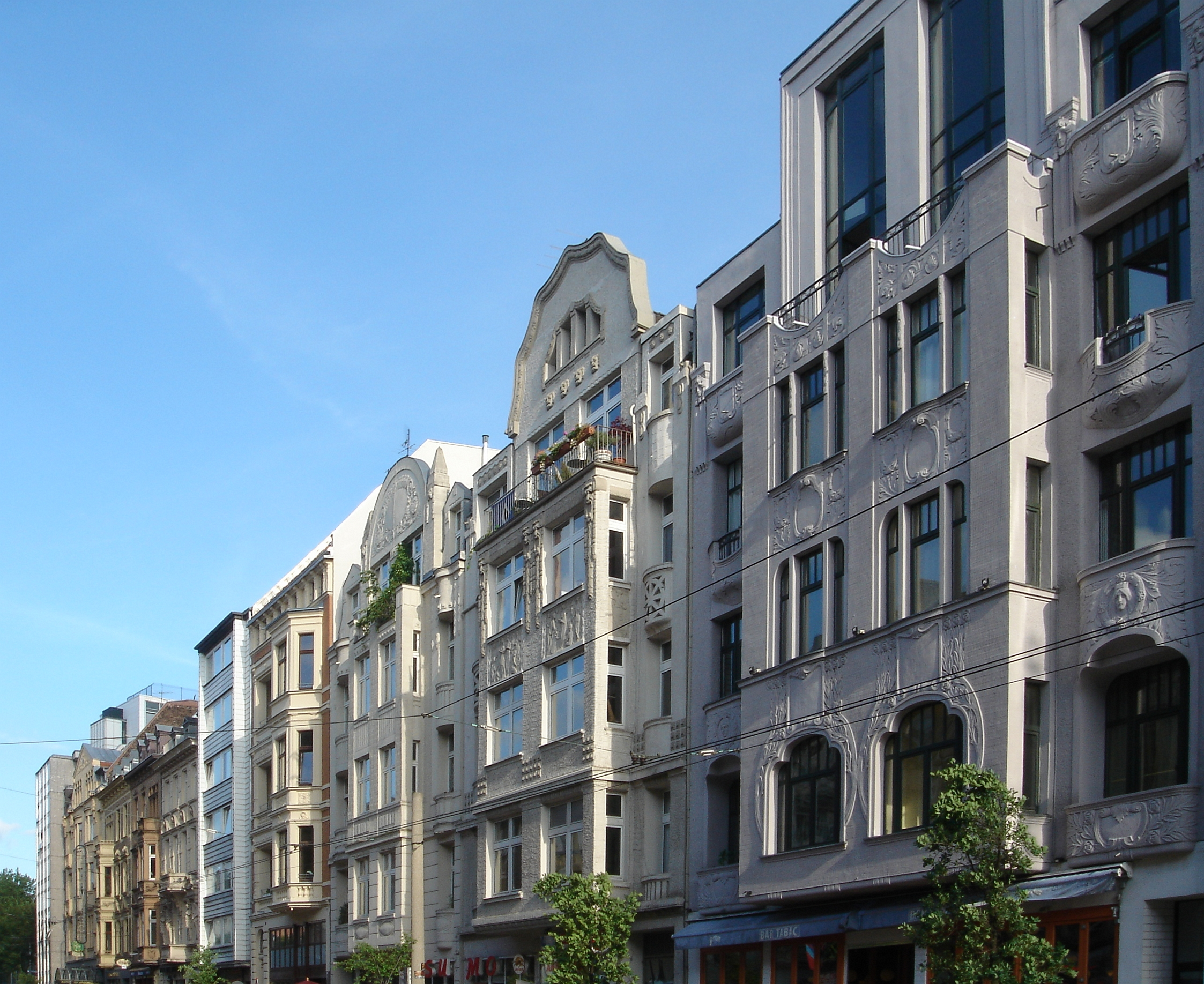
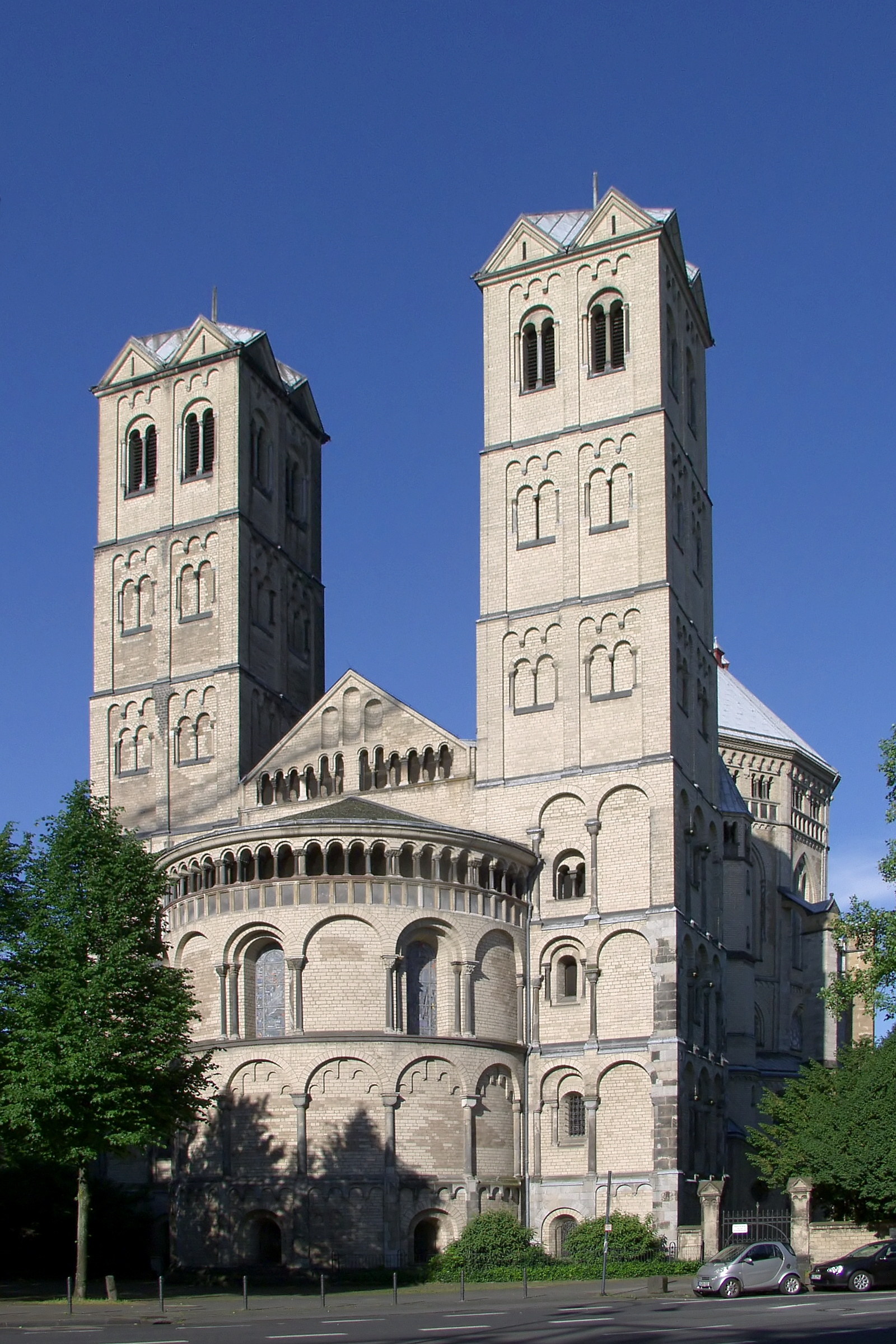
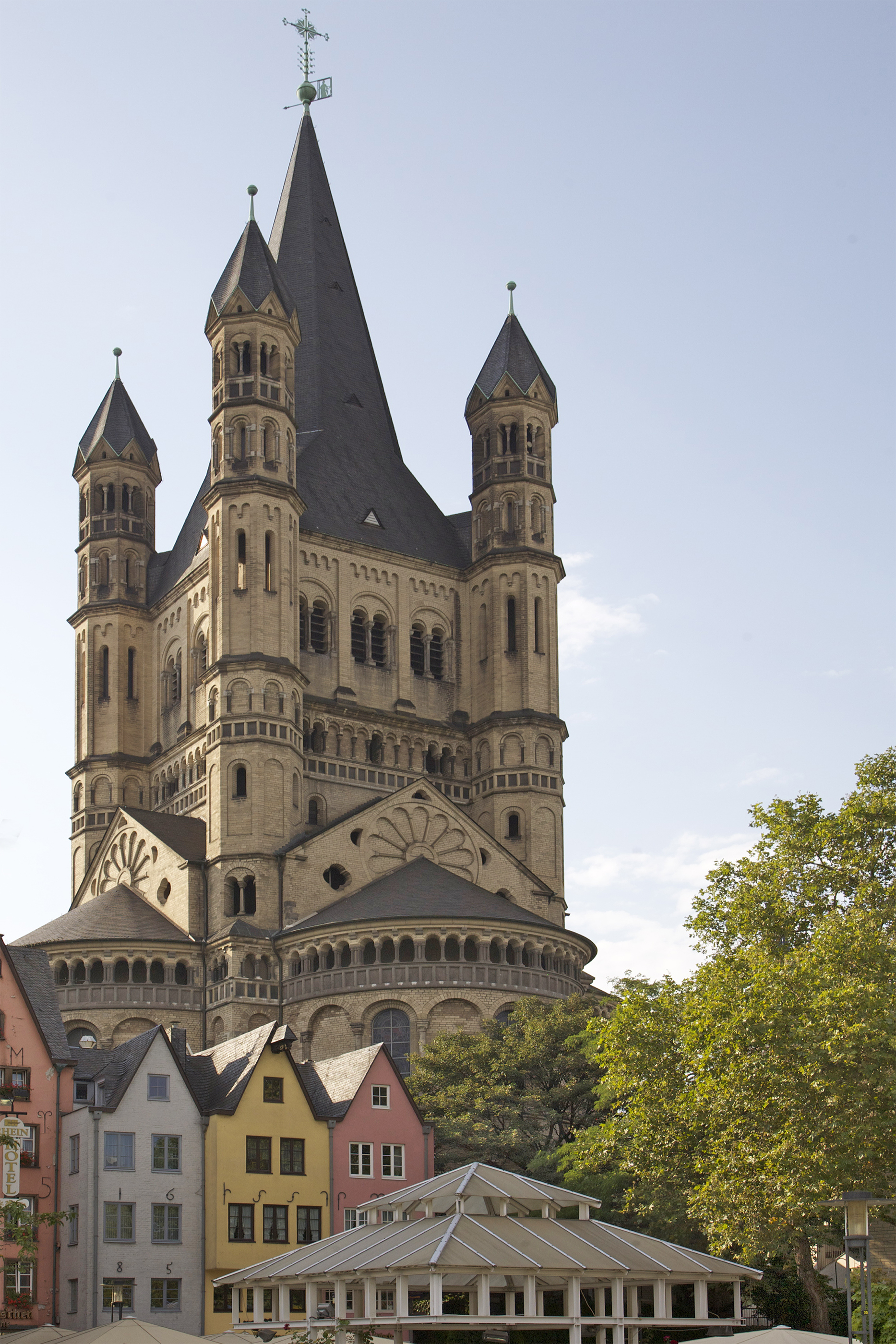
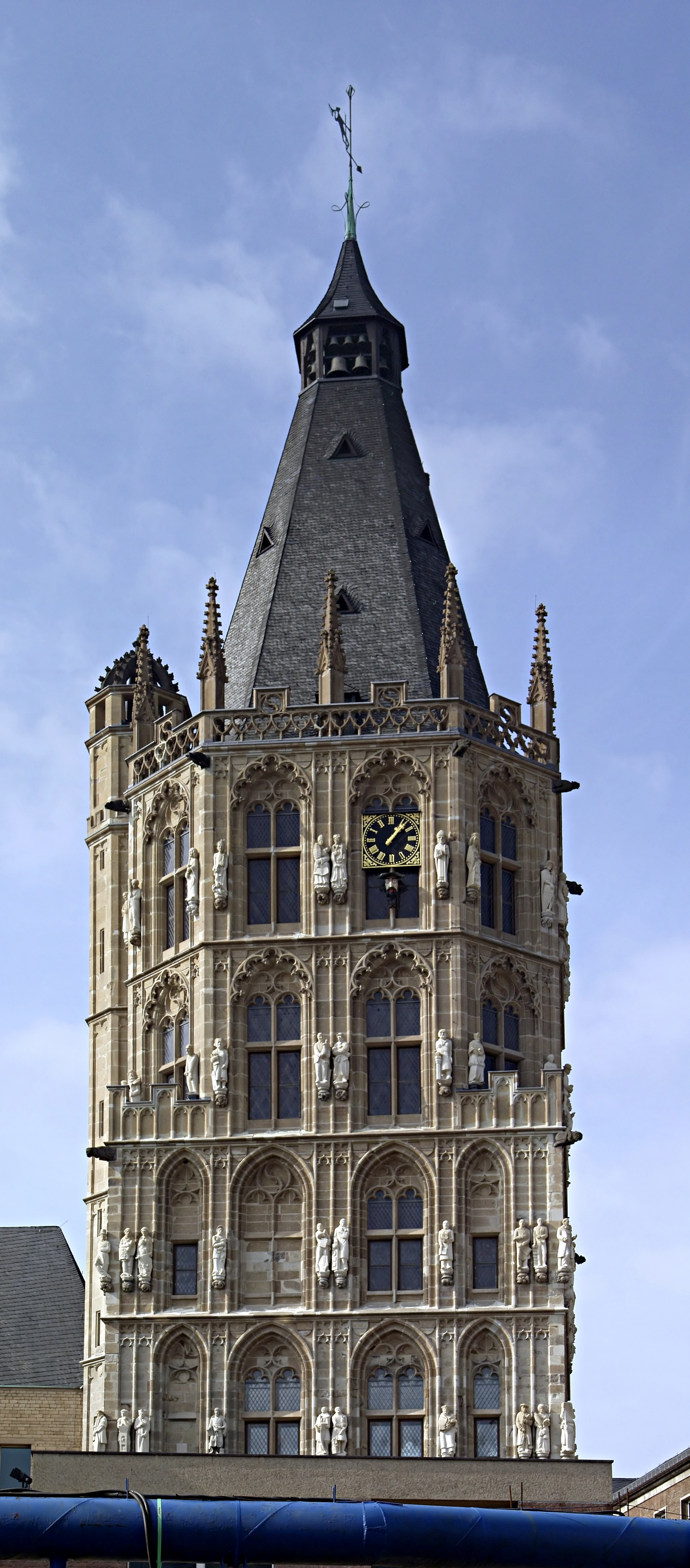
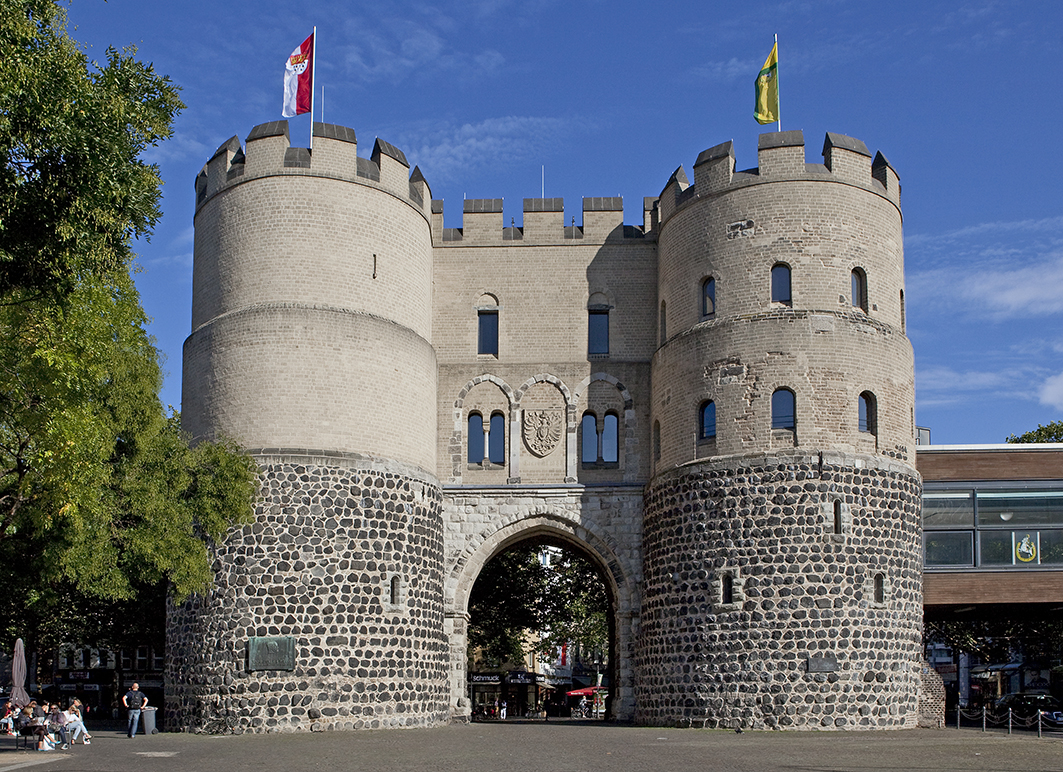
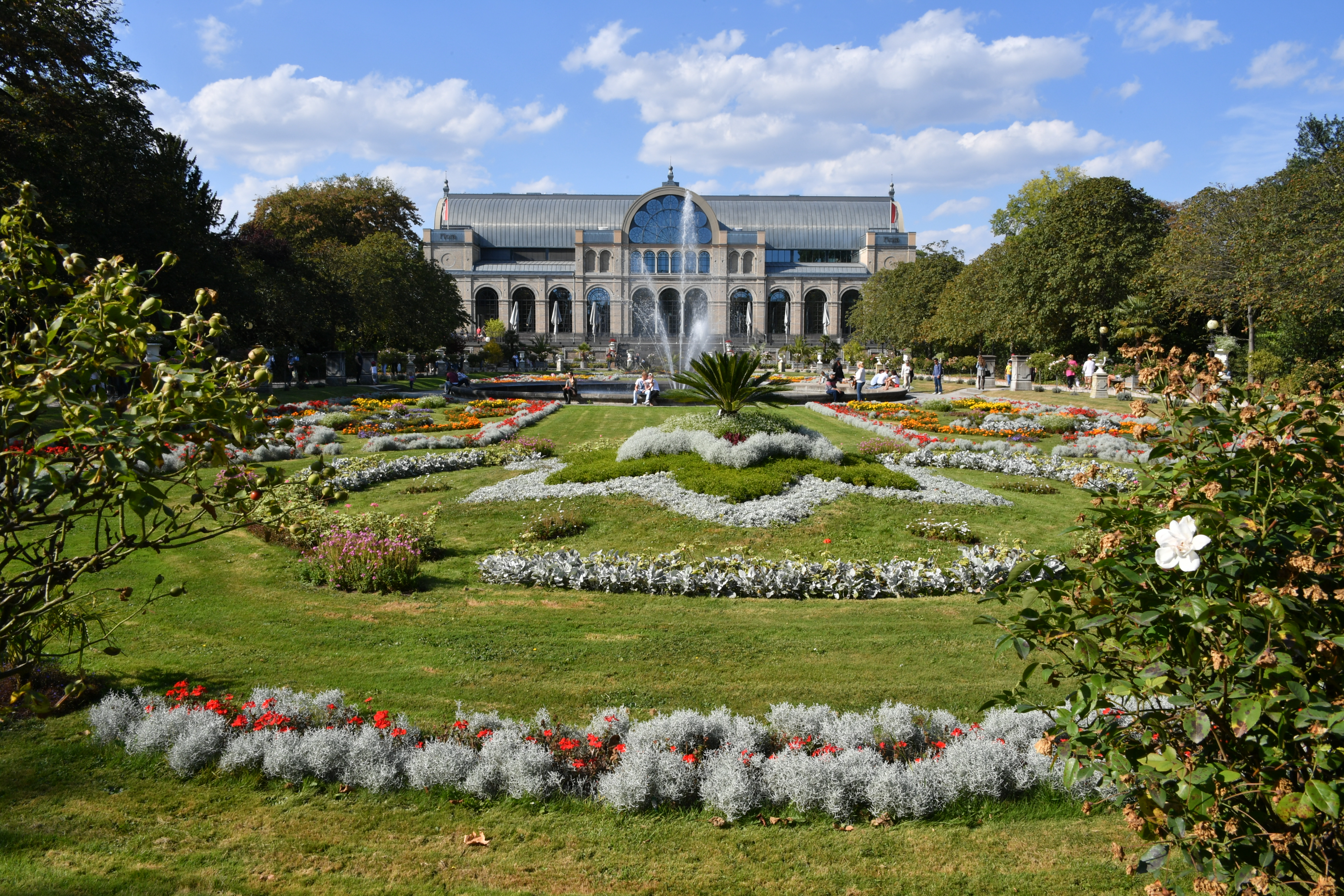
- View of Cologne with the Kranhäuser, Cologne Cathedral, and the Rhine Basilica of St Cunibert Belgian Quarter St Gereon's Basilica Great St Martin Church Cologne City Hall Hahnentorburg Flora Botanical Garden

- Flag Coat of arms

- Cologne within North Rhine-Westphalia
- Interactive map of Cologne
- Location within Germany Location within North Rhine-Westphalia
- Coordinates: 50°56′11″N 6°57′10″E
- Country: Germany
- State: North Rhine-Westphalia
- Admin. region: Cologne
- District: Urban district
- Founded: 38 BC

Government
  - Mayor (2025–30): Torsten Burmester (SPD)

Area
  - City: 405.15 km^{2} (156.43 sq mi)
- Elevation: 37 m (121 ft)

Population (2025-12-31)
  - City: 1,025,523
  - Density: 2,531.2/km^{2} (6,555.8/sq mi)
  - Urban: 3,500,000 (Cologne Bonn)
  - Metro: 8,711,712 (Rhineland)
- Time zone: UTC+01:00 (CET)
  - Summer (DST): UTC+02:00 (CEST)
- Postal codes: 50441–51149
- Dialling codes: 0221, 02203 (Porz)
- Vehicle registration: K
- Website: stadt-koeln.de

Cologne (/kəˈloʊn/ kə-LOHN; German: Köln [kœln]; Kölsch: Kölle [ˈkœ̂lə]) is the fourth-most populous city of Germany and the largest city of the German state of North Rhine-Westphalia with over one million inhabitants in the city proper and over 3.1 million people in the Cologne Bonn urban region. Cologne is also part of the Rhine-Ruhr metropolitan region, the second biggest metropolitan region by GDP in the European Union. Centred on the left bank of the Rhine, Cologne is located on the River Rhine (Lower Rhine), about 35 kilometres (22 mi) southeast of the North Rhine-Westphalia state capital Düsseldorf and 22 kilometres (14 mi) northwest of Bonn, the former capital of West Germany.

The city's medieval Cologne Cathedral (Kölner Dom) was the world's tallest building from 1880 to 1890 and is today the third-tallest church and tallest cathedral in the world. It was constructed to house the Shrine of the Three Kings and is a globally recognised landmark and one of the most visited sights and pilgrimage destinations in Europe. The cityscape is further shaped by the Twelve Romanesque churches of Cologne. Cologne is famous for Eau de Cologne, which has been produced in the city since 1709; "cologne" has since come to be a generic term.

Cologne was founded in Germanic Ubii territory in the 1st century AD as the Roman Colonia Agrippina, hence its name. Agrippina was later dropped (except in Latin) and Colonia became the name of the city in its own right, which developed into modern German as Köln. Cologne, the French version of the city's name, has become standard in English as well. Cologne was the capital of the Roman province of Germania Inferior and the headquarters of the Roman military in the region until occupied by the Franks in 462. During the Middle Ages the city flourished due to its location on one of the most important trade routes between eastern and western Europe (including the Brabant Road, Via Regia and Publica). Cologne was a free imperial city of the Holy Roman Empire and a major member of the Hanseatic League. It was one of the largest European cities in medieval and renaissance times.

Prior to World War II, the city had undergone occupations by the French (1794–1815) and the British (1918–1926) and was part of Prussia beginning in 1815. Cologne was one of the most heavily bombed cities in Germany during World War II. The bombing reduced the population by 93% mainly due to evacuation and destroyed around 80% of the millennia-old city centre. The post-war rebuilding has resulted in a mixed cityscape, restoring most major historic landmarks such as the city gates and churches (31 of them being Romanesque). The city nowadays consists of around 25% pre World War II buildings and boasts around 9,000 historic buildings.

Cologne is a major cultural centre for the Rhineland; it hosts more than 30 museums and hundreds of galleries. There are many institutions of higher education, most notably the University of Cologne, one of Germany's largest universities; the Cologne University of Applied Sciences, Germany's largest university of applied sciences; and the German Sport University Cologne. It hosts three Max Planck science institutes and is a major research hub for the aerospace industry, with the German Aerospace Centre and the European Astronaut Centre headquarters. Lufthansa, Europe's largest airline, has their main corporate headquarters in Cologne. It also has a significant chemical and automobile industry. Cologne Bonn Airport is a regional hub, the main airport for the region being Düsseldorf Airport. The Koelnmesse hosts a number of trade shows.

== History ==
=== Roman Cologne ===
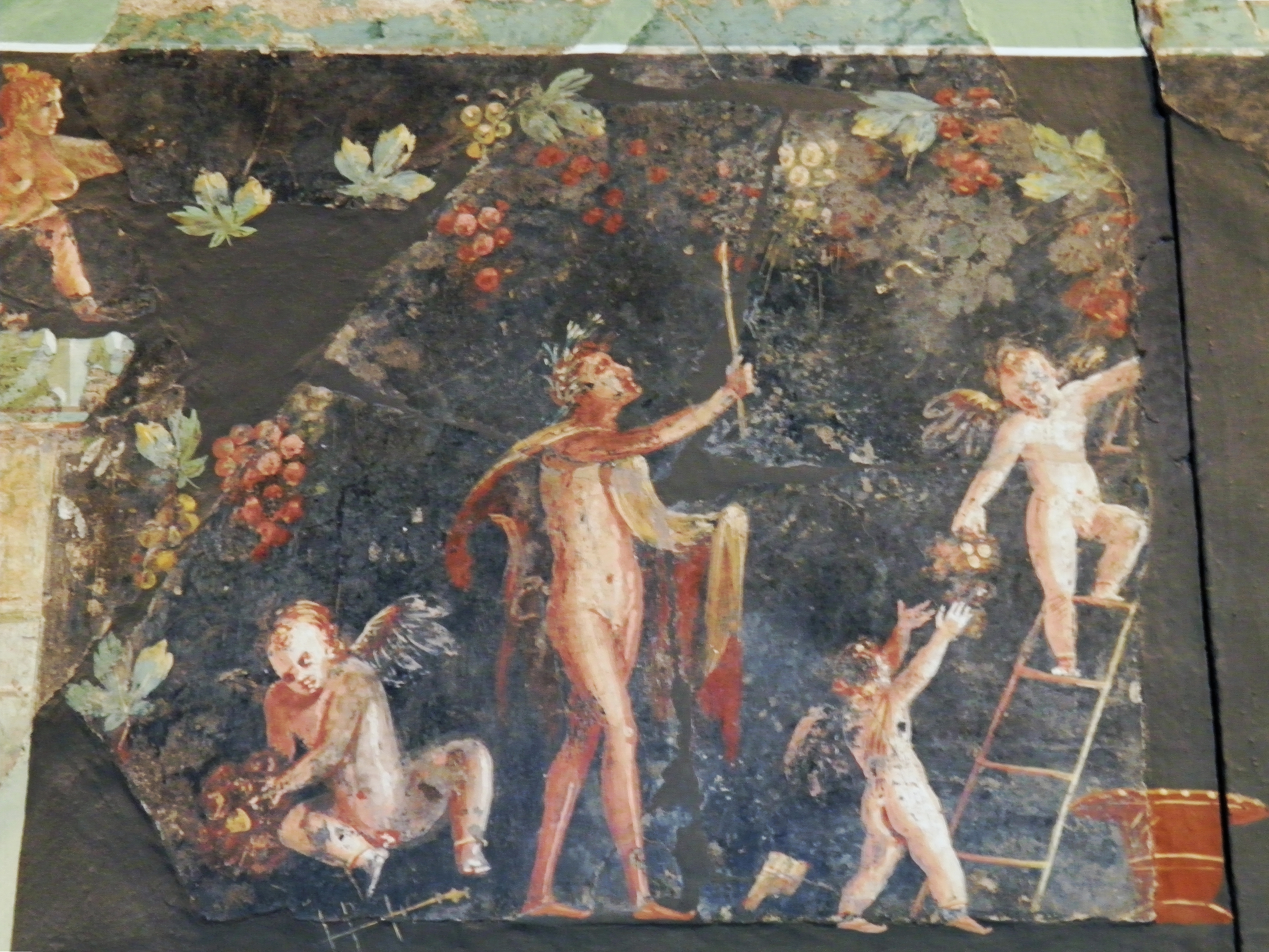
Fresco with Dionysian scenes from a Roman villa of Cologne, Germany (site of the ancient city Colonia Claudia Ara Agrippinensium), 3rd century AD, Romano-Germanic Museum

The first urban settlement on the grounds of modern-day Cologne was Oppidum Ubiorum, founded in 38 BC by the Ubii, a Cisrhenian Germanic tribe. In AD 50, the Romans founded Colonia Claudia Ara Agrippinensium (Cologne) on the river Rhine, a colonia which was named after Emperor Claudius and his wife, who was born here, Agrippina the Younger. In 85, the city became the provincial capital of Germania Inferior. It was also known as Augusta Ubiorum. Considerable Roman remains can be found in present-day Cologne, especially near the wharf area, where a 1,900-year-old Roman boat was discovered in late 2007. From 260 to 271, Cologne was the capital of the Gallic Empire under Postumus, Marius and Victorinus. In 310, under emperor Constantine I, a bridge was built over the Rhine at Cologne. Roman imperial governors resided in the city and it became one of the most important trade and production centres in the Roman Empire north of the Alps. Cologne is shown on the 4th century Peutinger Map.

Maternus, who was elected as bishop in 313, was the first known bishop of Cologne. The city was the capital of a Roman province until it was occupied by the Ripuarian Franks in 462. Parts of the original Roman sewers are preserved underneath the city, with the new sewerage system having opened in 1890.

After the destruction of the Second Temple in the Siege of Jerusalem and the associated dispersion (diaspora) of the Jews, there is evidence of a Jewish community in Cologne. In 321, Emperor Constantine approved the settlement of a Jewish community with all the freedoms of Roman citizens. It is assumed that it was located near the Marspforte within the city wall. The Edict of Constantine to the Jews is the oldest documented evidence in Germany.

=== Middle Ages ===
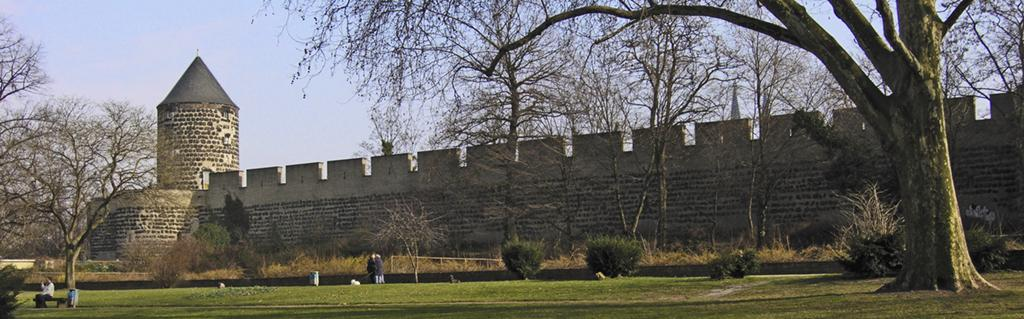
Remains of the medieval city wall on present-day Hansaring

Early medieval Cologne was part of Austrasia within the Frankish Empire. Cunibert, made bishop of Cologne in 623, was an important advisor to the Merovingian King Dagobert I and served with domesticus Pepin of Landen as tutor to the king's son and heir Siegebert III, the future king of Austrasia. In 716, Charles Martel commanded an army for the first time and suffered the only defeat of his life when Chilperic II, King of Neustria, invaded Austrasia and the city fell to him in the Battle of Cologne. Charles fled to the Eifel mountains, rallied supporters and took the city back that same year after defeating Chilperic in the Battle of Amblève. Cologne had been the seat of a bishop since the Roman period; under Charlemagne, in 795, bishop Hildebold was promoted to archbishop. In the 843 Treaty of Verdun Cologne fell into the dominion of Lothair I's Middle Francia – later called Lotharingia (Lower Lorraine).

In 953, the archbishops of Cologne first gained noteworthy secular power when bishop Bruno I was appointed as duke by his brother Otto I, King of Germany. In order to weaken the secular nobility, who threatened his power, Otto endowed Bruno and his archiepiscopal successors with the prerogatives of secular princes, thus establishing the Electorate of Cologne, formed by the temporal possessions of the archbishopric and included in the end a strip of territory along the left Bank of the Rhine east of Jülich, as well as the Duchy of Westphalia on the other side of the Rhine, beyond Berg and Mark. By the end of the 12th century, the Archbishop of Cologne was one of the seven electors of the Holy Roman Emperor. Besides being prince elector, he was Archchancellor of Italy as well, technically from 1238 and permanently from 1263 until 1803.

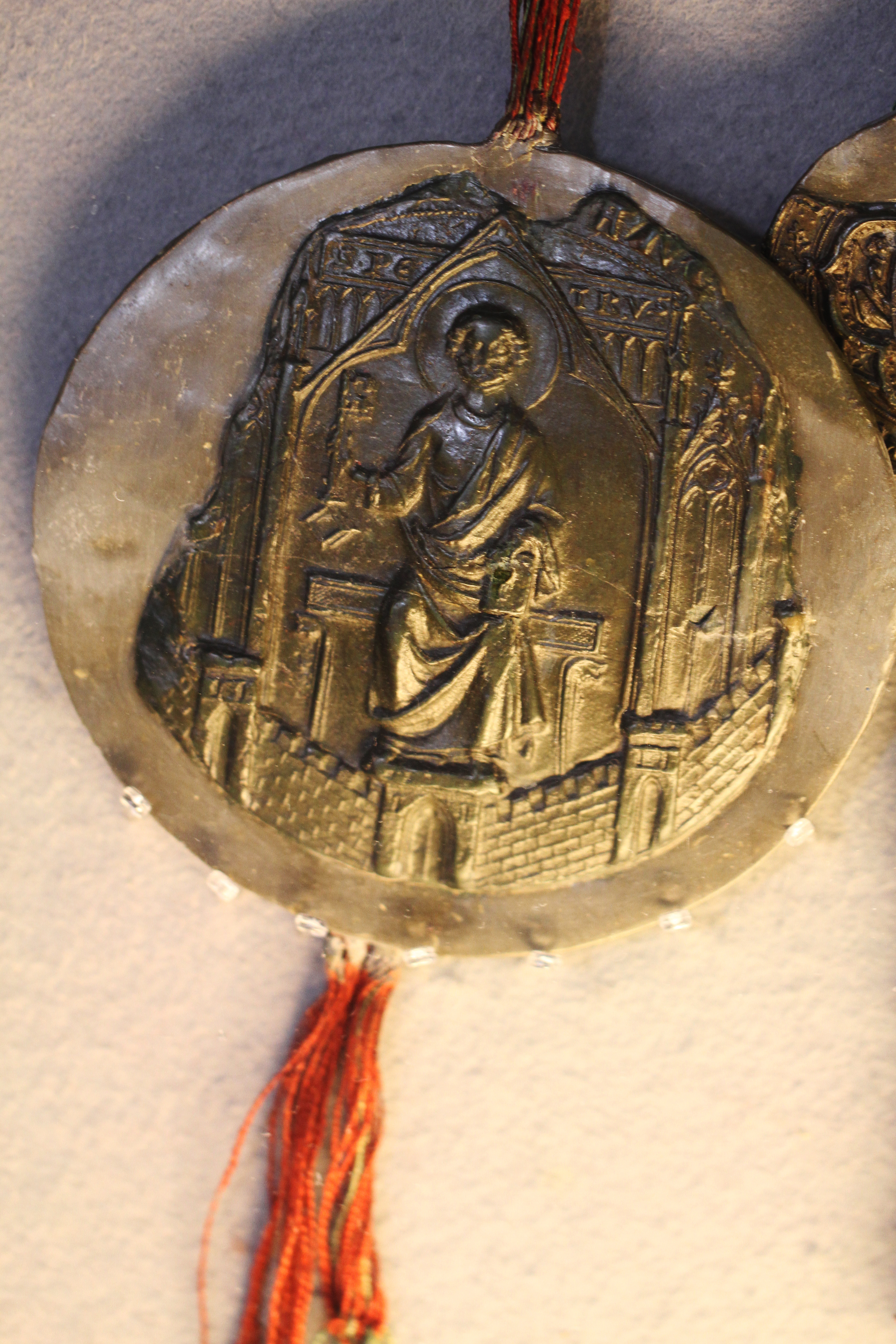
Gothic seal of the city of Cologne (1396)

Following the Battle of Worringen in 1288, Cologne gained its independence from the archbishops and became a Free City. Archbishop Sigfried II von Westerburg was forced to reside in Bonn. The archbishop nevertheless preserved the right of capital punishment. Thus the municipal council (though in strict political opposition towards the archbishop) depended upon him in all matters concerning criminal justice. This included torture, the sentence for which was only allowed to be handed down by the episcopal judge known as the greve. This legal situation lasted until the French conquest of Cologne.

Besides its economic and political significance Cologne also became an important centre of medieval pilgrimage, when Cologne's archbishop, Rainald of Dassel, gave the relics of the Three Wise Men to Cologne's cathedral in 1164 (after they had been taken from Milan). Besides the three magi Cologne preserves the relics of Saint Ursula and Albertus Magnus.

Cologne's location on the river Rhine placed it at the intersection of the major trade routes between east and west as well as the main south–north Western Europe trade route, Venice to Netherlands; even by the mid-10th century, merchants in the town were already known for their prosperity and luxurious standard of living due to the availability of trade opportunities. The intersection of these trade routes was the basis of Cologne's growth. By the end of the 12th century, Archbishop Phillip von Heinsberg enclosed the entire city with walls. By 1300 the city population was 50,000–55,000. Cologne was a member of the Hanseatic League in 1475, when Frederick III confirmed the city's imperial immediacy. Cologne was so influential in regional commerce that its systems of weights and measurements (e.g. the Cologne mark) were used throughout Europe.

=== Early modern history ===
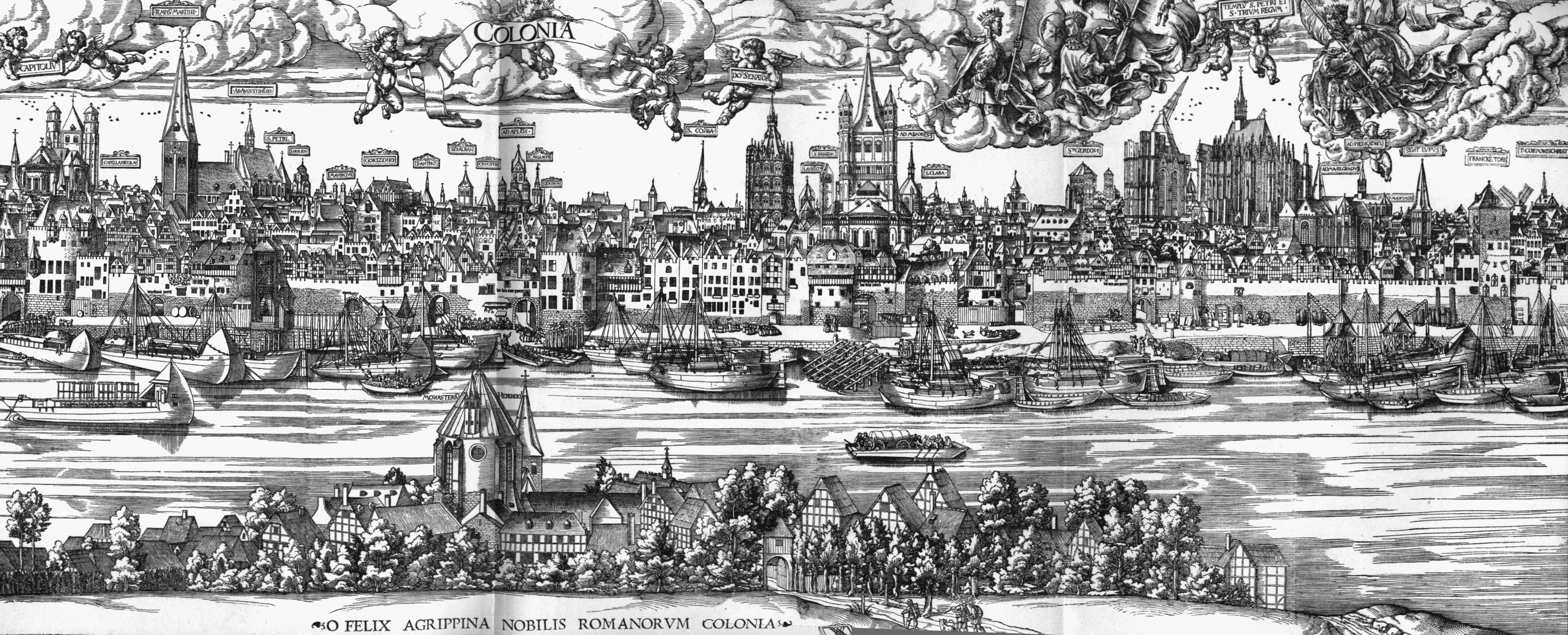
Panorama of Cologne in 1531

The economic structures of medieval and early modern Cologne were characterised by the city's status as a major harbour and transport hub on the Rhine. Craftsmanship was organised by self-administering guilds, some of which were exclusive to women.

As a free imperial city, Cologne was a self-ruling state within the Holy Roman Empire, an imperial estate with seat and vote at the Imperial Diet, and as such had the right (and obligation) to contribute to the defense of the Empire and maintain its own military force. As they wore a red uniform, these troops were known as the Rote Funken (red sparks). These soldiers were part of the Army of the Holy Roman Empire ("Reichskontingent"). They fought in the wars of the 17th and 18th century, including the wars against revolutionary France in which the small force was almost completely wiped out in combat. The tradition of these troops is preserved as a military persiflage by Cologne's most outstanding carnival society, the Rote Funken.

Reconstruction of 17th-century Cologne (in German, English subtitles available)

The Free Imperial City of Cologne must not be confused with the Electorate of Cologne, which was a state of its own within the Holy Roman Empire. Since the second half of the 16th century, the majority of archbishops were drawn from the Bavarian Wittelsbach dynasty. Due to the free status of Cologne, the archbishops were usually not allowed to enter the city. Thus they took up residence in Bonn and later in Brühl on the Rhine. As members of an influential and powerful family, and supported by their outstanding status as electors, the archbishops of Cologne repeatedly challenged and threatened the free status of Cologne during the 17th and 18th centuries, resulting in complicated affairs, which were handled by diplomatic means and propaganda as well as by the supreme courts of the Holy Roman Empire.

=== From the 19th century until World War I ===
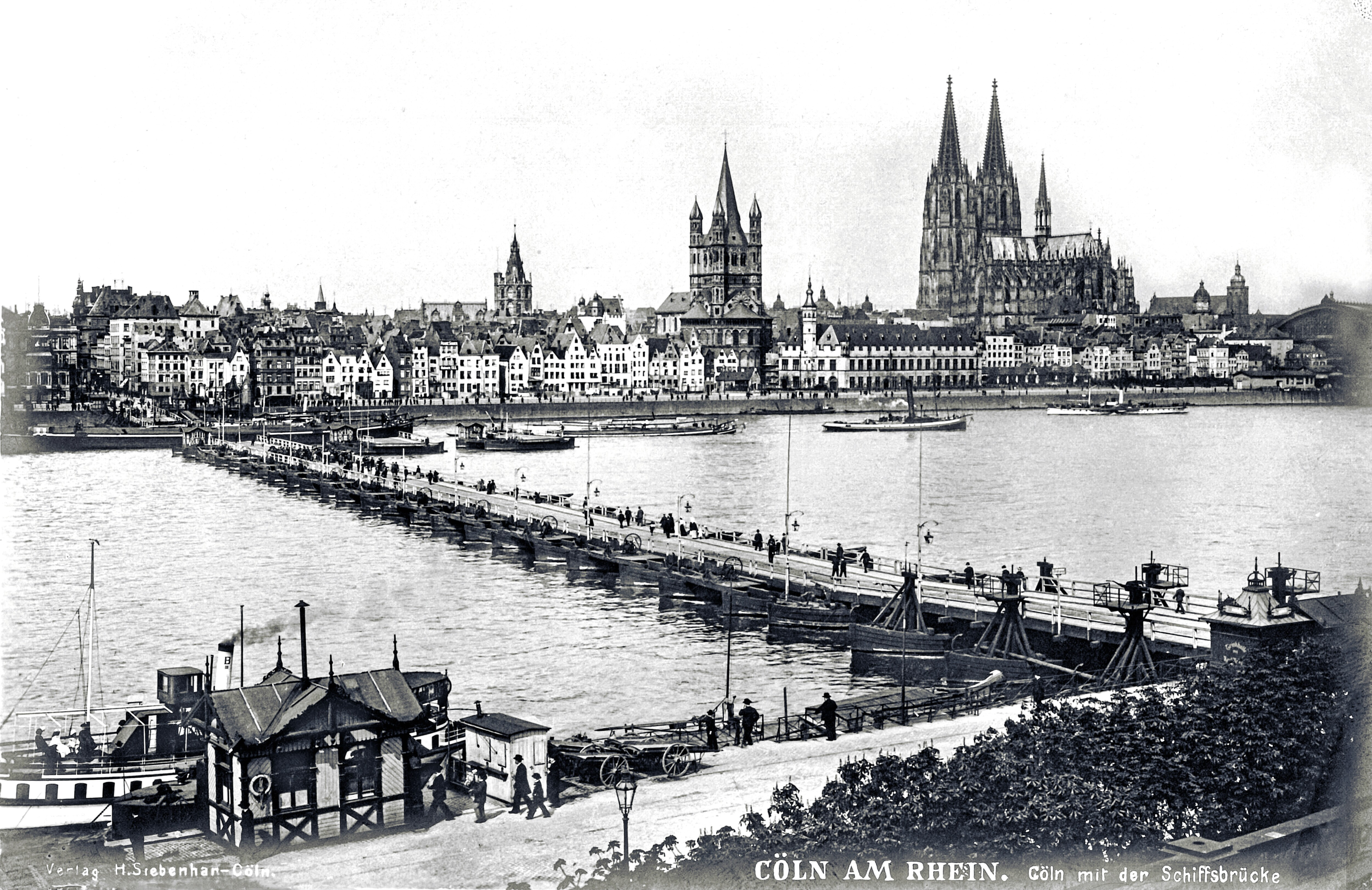
View of Cologne, c. 1890

Cologne lost its status as a free imperial city during the French period. According to the Treaty of Lunéville (1801), all the territories of the Holy Roman Empire on the left bank of the Rhine were officially incorporated into the French Republic (which had already occupied Cologne in 1794). Thus this region later became part of Napoleon's empire. Cologne was part of the French Département Roer (named after the river Roer, German: Rur) with Aachen (French: Aix-la-Chapelle) as its capital. The French modernised public life, for example, by introducing the Napoleonic Code and removing the old elites from power. The Napoleonic Code remained in use on the left bank of the Rhine until 1900, when a unified civil code (the Bürgerliches Gesetzbuch) was introduced in the German Empire. In 1815, at the Congress of Vienna, Cologne was made part of the Kingdom of Prussia, first in the Province of Jülich-Cleves-Berg and then the Rhine Province.

The permanent tensions between the Catholic Rhineland and the overwhelmingly Protestant Prussian state repeatedly escalated with Cologne being in the focus of the conflict. In 1837, the archbishop of Cologne, Clemens August von Droste-Vischering, was arrested and imprisoned for two years after a dispute over the legal status of marriages between Catholics and Protestants (Mischehenstreit). In 1874, during the Kulturkampf, Archbishop Paul Melchers was imprisoned before taking asylum in the Netherlands. These conflicts alienated the Catholic population from Berlin and contributed to a deeply felt anti-Prussian resentment, which was still significant after World War II, when the former mayor of Cologne, Konrad Adenauer, became the first West German chancellor.

During the 19th and 20th centuries, Cologne absorbed numerous surrounding towns and by World War I had already grown to 700,000 inhabitants. Industrialisation changed the city and spurred its growth. Vehicle and engine manufacturing was especially successful, though the heavy industry was less ubiquitous than in the Ruhr area. The cathedral, started in 1248 but abandoned around 1560, was eventually finished in 1880 not just as a place of worship but also as a German national monument celebrating the newly founded German Empire and the continuity of the German nation since the Middle Ages. Some of this urban growth occurred at the expense of the city's historic heritage with much being demolished (for example, the city walls or the area around the cathedral) and sometimes replaced by contemporary buildings.

Cologne was designated as one of the Fortresses of the German Confederation. It was turned into a heavily armed fortress (opposing the French and Belgian fortresses of Verdun and Liège) with two fortified belts surrounding the city, the remains of which can be seen to this day. The military demands on what became Germany's largest fortress presented a significant obstacle to urban development, with forts, bunkers and wide defensive dugouts completely encircling the city and preventing expansion; this resulted in a very densely built-up area within the city itself.

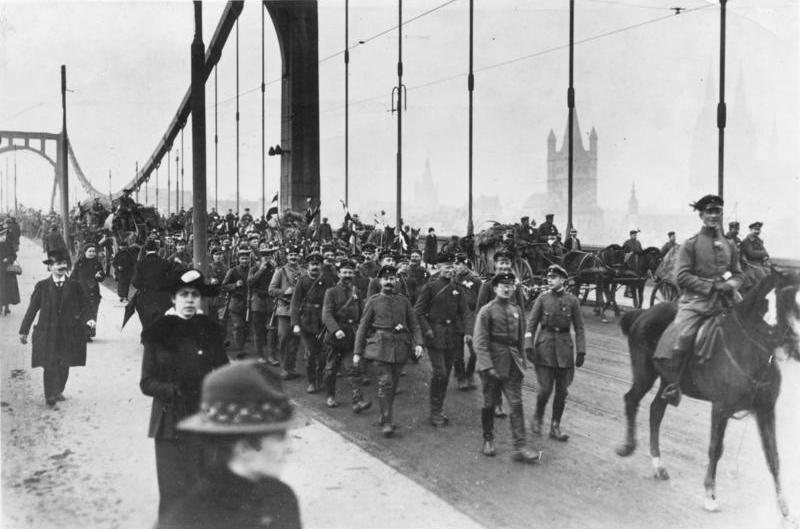
Following the end of the First World War, German Army troops return to the right bank of the Rhine via the Deutz Suspension Bridge, November 1918.

During World War I Cologne was the target of several minor air raids but suffered no significant damage. Cologne was occupied by the British Army of the Rhine until 1926, under the terms of the Armistice and the subsequent Versailles Peace Treaty. In contrast with the harsh behaviour of the French occupation troops in Germany, the British forces were more lenient to the local population. Konrad Adenauer, the mayor of Cologne from 1917 until 1933 and later a West German chancellor, acknowledged the political impact of this approach, especially since Britain had opposed French demands for a permanent Allied occupation of the entire Rhineland.

As part of the demilitarisation of the Rhineland, the city's fortifications had to be dismantled. This was an opportunity to create two green belts (Grüngürtel) around the city by converting the fortifications and their fields of fire into large public parks. This was not completed until 1933. In 1919 the University of Cologne, closed by the French in 1798, was reopened. This was considered to be a replacement for the loss of the University of Strasbourg on the west bank of the Rhine, which reverted to France with the rest of Alsace. Cologne prospered during the Weimar Republic (1919–33), and progress was made especially in public governance, city planning, housing and social affairs. Social housing projects were considered exemplary and were copied by other German cities. Cologne competed to host the Olympics, and a modern sports stadium was erected at Müngersdorf. When the British occupation ended, the prohibition of civil aviation was lifted and Cologne Butzweilerhof Airport soon became a hub for national and international air traffic, second in Germany only to Berlin Tempelhof Airport.

=== Nazi era and World War II ===
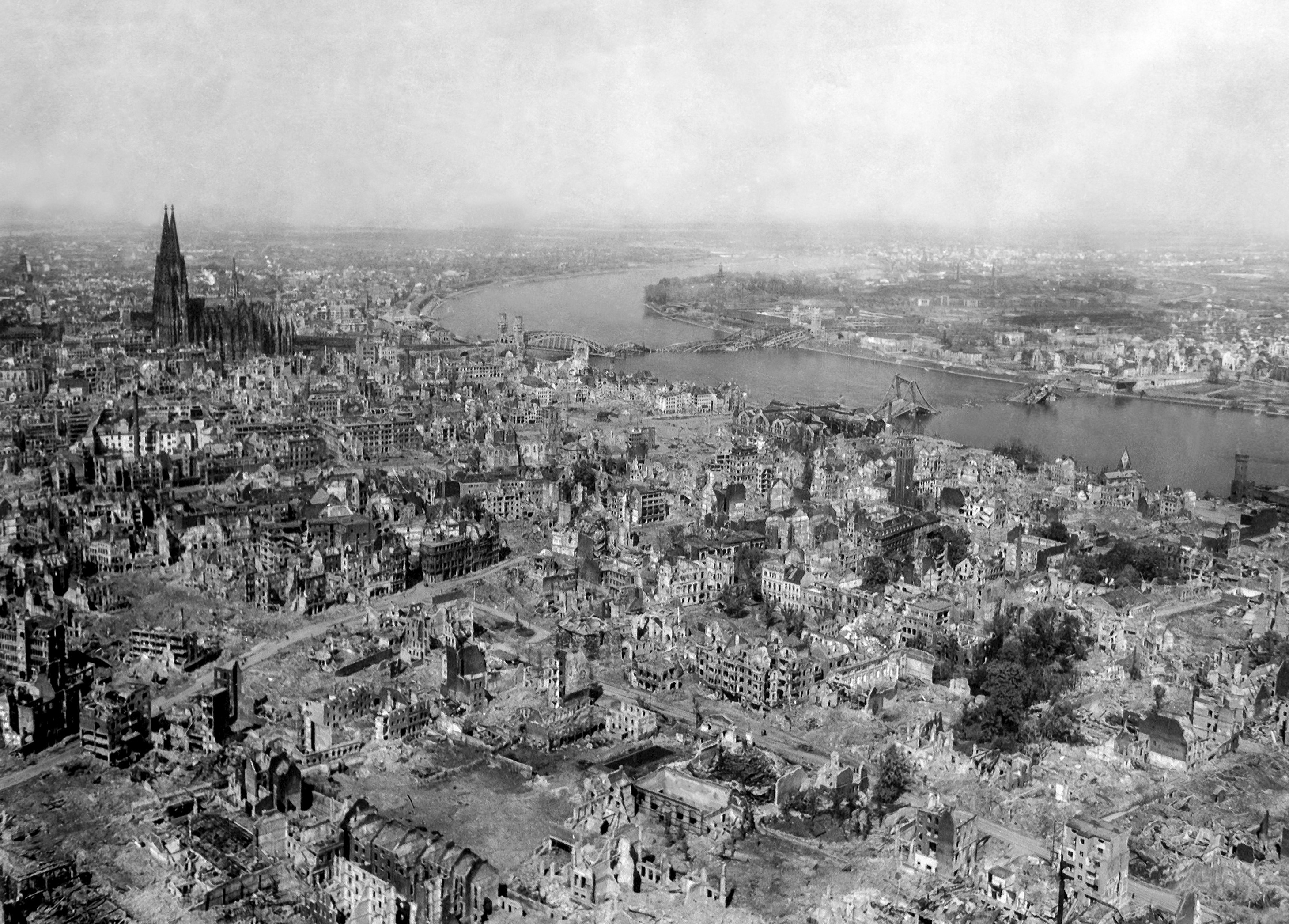
The devastation of Cologne, 1945

The democratic parties lost the local elections in Cologne in March 1933 to the Nazi Party and other extreme-right parties. The Nazis then arrested the Communist and Social Democrats members of the city assembly, with mayor Adenauer getting dismissed. Compared to some other major cities, however, the Nazis never gained decisive support in Cologne. (Significantly, the number of votes cast for the Nazi Party in Reichstag elections had always been the national average.) By 1939, the population had risen to 772,221 inhabitants.

During World War II, Cologne was a Military Area Command Headquarters (Militärbereichshauptkommandoquartier) for Wehrkreis VI (headquartered at Münster). Cologne was under the command of Lieutenant-General Freiherr Roeder von Diersburg, who was responsible for military operations in Bonn, Siegburg, Aachen, Jülich, Düren and Monschau. Cologne was home to the 211th Infantry Regiment and the 26th Artillery Regiment.

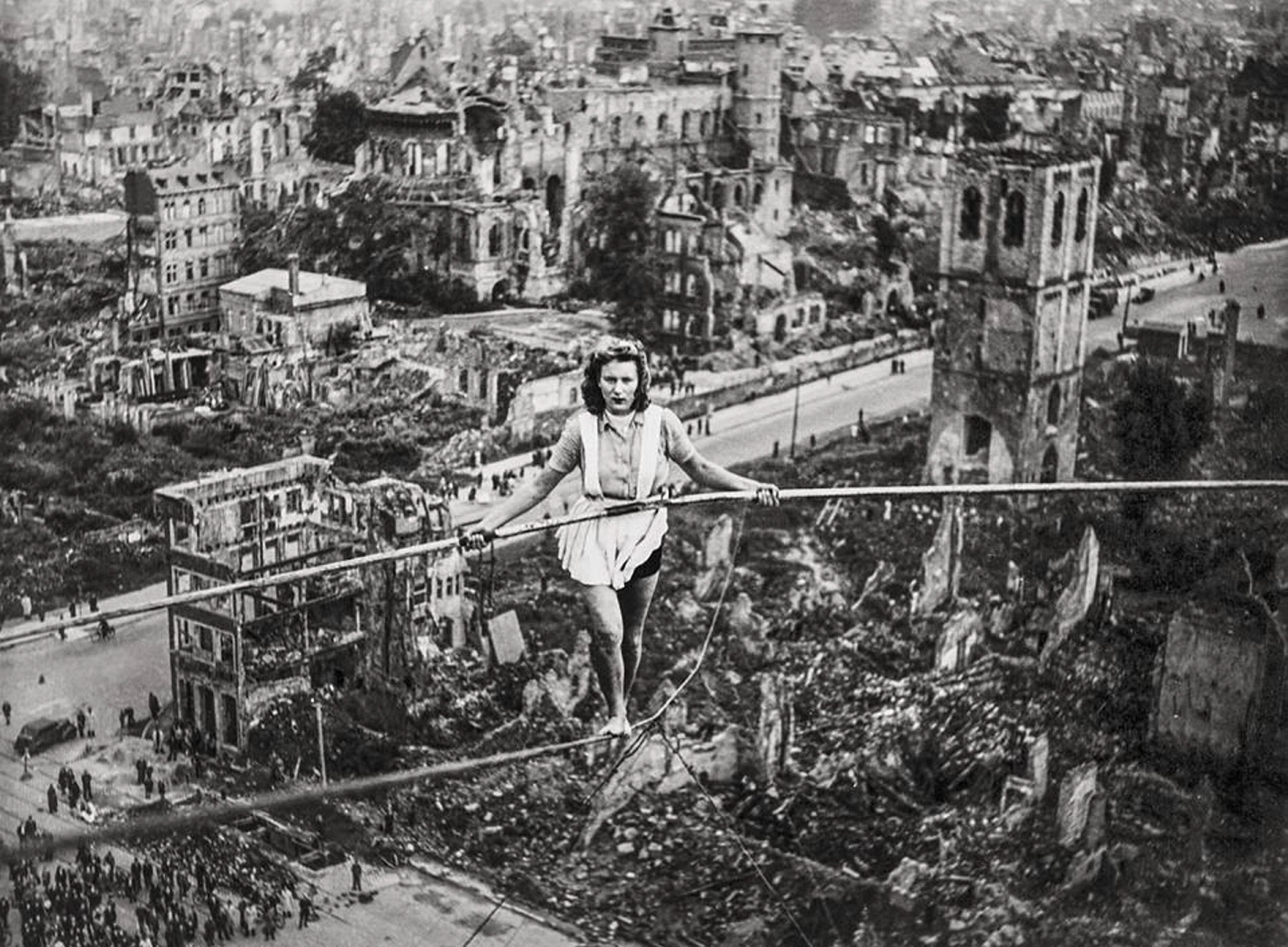
Margret Zimmermann walking on a tightrope above the ruins of Cologne in 1946

The Allies dropped 44,923.2 tons of bombs on the city during World War II, destroying 61% of its built-up area. During the Bombing of Cologne in World War II, Cologne endured 262 air raids by the Western Allies, which caused approximately 20,000 civilian casualties and almost completely wiped out the central part of the city. During the night of 31 May 1942, Cologne was the target of "Operation Millennium", the first 1,000 bomber raid by the Royal Air Force in World War II. 1,046 heavy bombers attacked their target with 1,455 tons of explosives, approximately two-thirds of which were incendiary. This raid lasted about 75 minutes, destroyed 600 acres (243 ha) of built-up area (61%), killed 486 civilians and made 59,000 people homeless. The devastation was recorded by Hermann Claasen from 1942 until the end of the war and presented in his exhibition and book of 1947 Singing in the furnace. Cologne – Remains of an old city.

Cologne was taken by the American First Army in early March 1945 during the Invasion of Germany after a battle. By the end of the war, the population of Cologne had been reduced by 95%. This loss was mainly caused by a massive evacuation of the people to more rural areas. The same happened in many other German cities in the last two years of war. By the end of 1945, however, the population had already recovered to approximately 450,000. By the end of the war, essentially all of Cologne's pre-war Jewish population of 11,000 had been deported or killed by the Nazis. The six synagogues of the city were destroyed. The synagogue on Roonstraße was rebuilt in 1959.

=== Postwar and Cold War eras ===
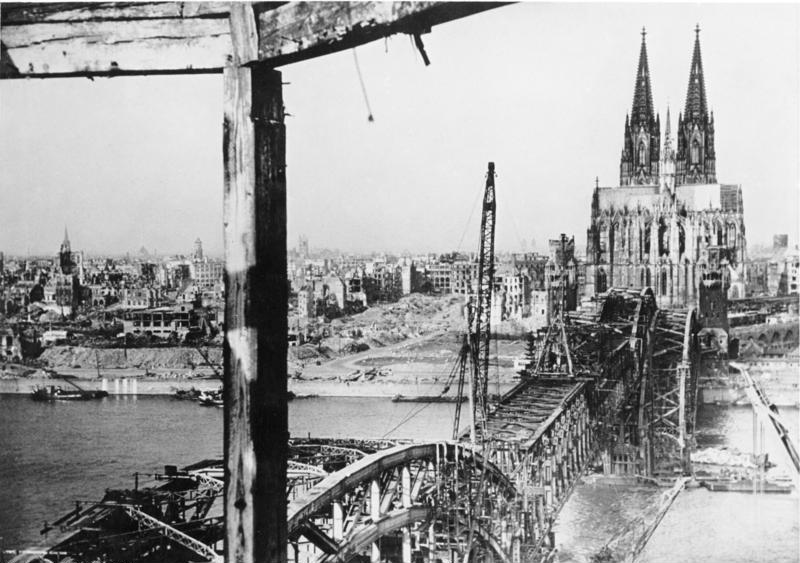
Postwar reconstruction of the Hohenzollern Bridge, April 1948

Despite Cologne's status as the largest city in the region, nearby Düsseldorf was chosen as the political capital of the federated state of North Rhine-Westphalia. With Bonn being chosen as the provisional federal capital (provisorische Bundeshauptstadt) and seat of the government of the Federal Republic of Germany (then informally West Germany), Cologne benefited by being sandwiched between two important political centres. The city became–and still is–home to a number of federal agencies and organizations. After reunification in 1990, Berlin was made the capital of Germany.

In 1945 architect and urban planner Rudolf Schwarz called Cologne the "world's greatest heap of rubble". Schwarz designed the master plan for reconstruction in 1947, which included the construction of several new thoroughfares through the city centre, especially the Nord-Süd-Fahrt ("North-South-Drive"). The master plan took into consideration the fact that even shortly after the war a large increase in automobile traffic could be anticipated. Plans for new roads had already, to a certain degree, evolved under the Nazi administration, but the actual construction became easier when most of the city centre was in ruins.

The destruction of 95% of the city centre, including the famous Twelve Romanesque churches such as St Gereon's Basilica, Great St Martin Church, St Maria im Kapitol and several other monuments in World War II, meant a tremendous loss of cultural treasures. The rebuilding of those churches and other landmarks such as the Gürzenich event hall was not undisputed among leading architects and art historians at that time, but in most cases, civil intention prevailed. The reconstruction lasted until the 1990s, when the Romanesque church of Basilica of St Cunibert was finished.

In 1959, the city's population reached pre-war numbers again. It then grew steadily, exceeding 1 million for about one year from 1975. It remained just below that until mid-2010, when it exceeded 1 million again.

=== Post-reunification ===
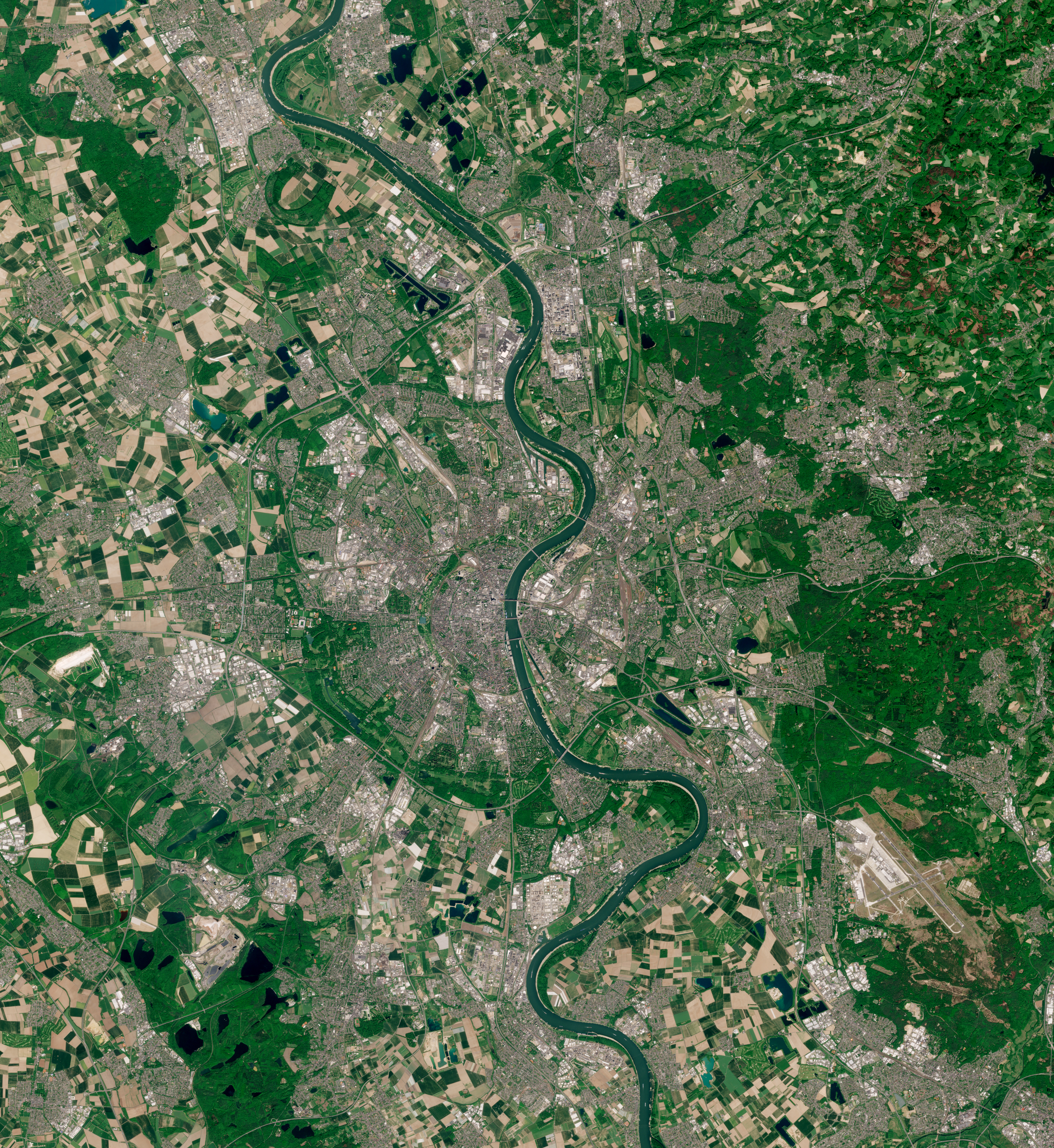
Cologne, seen from ESA Sentinel-2

In the 1980s and 1990s Cologne's economy prospered for two main reasons. The first was the growth in the number of media companies, both in the private and public sectors; they are especially catered for in the newly developed Media Park, which creates a strong visual focal point in Cologne's city centre and includes the KölnTurm, one of Cologne's most prominent high-rise buildings. The second was the permanent improvement of the diverse traffic infrastructure, which made Cologne one of the most easily accessible metropolitan areas in Central Europe.

Due to the economic success of the Koelnmesse, the city arranged a large extension to the fair site in 2005. At the same time the original buildings, which date back to the 1920s, were rented out to RTL, Germany's largest private broadcaster, as their new corporate headquarters.

Cologne was the focus of the 2015-16 New Year's Eve sexual assaults in Germany, with over 500 women reporting that they were sexually assaulted by persons of African and Arab appearance.

== Geography ==
The metropolitan area encompasses over 405 square kilometres (156 square miles), extending around a central point that lies at 50° 56' 33 latitude and 6° 57' 32 longitude. The city's highest point is 118 m (387 ft) above sea level (the Monte Troodelöh) and its lowest point is 37.5 m (123 ft) above sea level (the Worringer Bruch). The city of Cologne lies within the larger area of the Cologne Lowland, a cone-shaped area of the central Rhineland that lies between Bonn, Aachen and Düsseldorf.

=== Districts ===
Cologne is divided into 9 boroughs (Stadtbezirke) and 85 districts (Stadtteile):

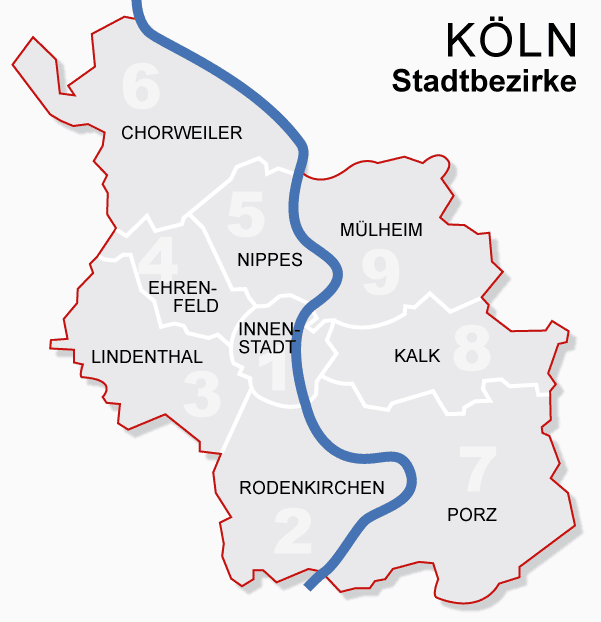
Innenstadt (Stadtbezirk 1) Altstadt-Nord, Altstadt-Süd, Neustadt-Nord, Neustadt-Süd, Deutz Rodenkirchen (Stadtbezirk 2) Bayenthal, Godorf, Hahnwald, Immendorf, Marienburg, Meschenich, Raderberg, Raderthal, Rodenkirchen, Rondorf, Sürth, Weiß, Zollstock Lindenthal (Stadtbezirk 3) Braunsfeld, Junkersdorf, Klettenberg, Lindenthal, Lövenich, Müngersdorf, Sülz, Weiden, Widdersdorf Ehrenfeld (Stadtbezirk 4) Bickendorf, Bocklemünd/Mengenich, Ehrenfeld, Neuehrenfeld, Ossendorf, Vogelsang Nippes (Stadtbezirk 5) Bilderstöckchen, Longerich, Mauenheim, Niehl, Nippes, Riehl, Weidenpesch	Chorweiler (Stadtbezirk 6) Blumenberg, Chorweiler, Esch/Auweiler, Fühlingen, Heimersdorf, Lindweiler, Merkenich, Pesch, Roggendorf/Thenhoven, Seeberg, Volkhoven/Weiler, Worringen Porz (Stadtbezirk 7) Eil, Elsdorf, Ensen, Finkenberg, Gremberghoven, Grengel, Langel, Libur, Lind, Poll, Porz, Urbach, Wahn, Wahnheide, Westhoven, Zündorf Kalk (Stadtbezirk 8) Brück, Höhenberg, Humboldt/Gremberg, Kalk, Merheim, Neubrück, Ostheim, Rath/Heumar, Vingst Mülheim (Stadtbezirk 9) Buchforst, Buchheim, Dellbrück, Dünnwald, Flittard, Höhenhaus, Holweide, Mülheim, Stammheim

=== Climate ===
Located in the Rhine-Ruhr area, Cologne is one of the warmest cities in Germany. It has a temperate–oceanic climate (Köppen: Cfb) with cool winters and warm summers. It is also one of the cloudiest cities in Germany, with just 1,567.5 hours of sun a year. Its average annual temperature is 10.7 °C (51 °F): 15.4 °C (60 °F) during the day and 6.1 °C (43 °F) at night. In January, the mean temperature is 3.0 °C (37 °F), while the mean temperature in July is 19.0 °C (66 °F). The record high temperature of 40.3 °C (105 °F) happened on 25 July 2019 during the July 2019 European heat wave in which Cologne saw three consecutive days over 38.0 °C (100 °F). Especially the inner urban neighbourhoods experience a greater number of hot days, as well as significantly higher temperatures during nighttime compared to the surrounding area (including the airport, where temperatures are classified). Still temperatures can vary noticeably over the course of a month with warmer and colder weather. Precipitation is spread evenly throughout the year with a light peak in summer due to showers and thunderstorms.

Climate data for Cologne (Cologne Bonn Airport, 1991–2020 normals, extremes 1957–present)
Month	Jan	Feb	Mar	Apr	May	Jun	Jul	Aug	Sep	Oct	Nov	Dec	Year
Record high °C (°F)	16.2 (61.2)	21.0 (69.8)	25.3 (77.5)	30.8 (87.4)	34.4 (93.9)	36.8 (98.2)	40.3 (104.5)	38.8 (101.8)	33.1 (91.6)	27.6 (81.7)	20.2 (68.4)	16.7 (62.1)	40.3 (104.5)
Mean maximum °C (°F)	13.1 (55.6)	14.5 (58.1)	19.7 (67.5)	24.7 (76.5)	28.2 (82.8)	31.7 (89.1)	33.2 (91.8)	32.7 (90.9)	27.4 (81.3)	22.3 (72.1)	16.8 (62.2)	13.2 (55.8)	35.4 (95.7)
Mean daily maximum °C (°F)	5.9 (42.6)	7.2 (45.0)	11.4 (52.5)	16.1 (61.0)	19.7 (67.5)	22.7 (72.9)	24.9 (76.8)	24.5 (76.1)	20.4 (68.7)	15.2 (59.4)	9.8 (49.6)	6.5 (43.7)	15.4 (59.7)
Daily mean °C (°F)	3.0 (37.4)	3.6 (38.5)	6.7 (44.1)	10.4 (50.7)	14.1 (57.4)	17.1 (62.8)	19.0 (66.2)	18.5 (65.3)	14.8 (58.6)	10.8 (51.4)	6.7 (44.1)	3.8 (38.8)	10.7 (51.3)
Mean daily minimum °C (°F)	0.0 (32.0)	0.1 (32.2)	2.0 (35.6)	4.5 (40.1)	8.1 (46.6)	11.2 (52.2)	13.3 (55.9)	12.8 (55.0)	9.7 (49.5)	6.8 (44.2)	3.5 (38.3)	1.0 (33.8)	6.1 (42.9)
Mean minimum °C (°F)	−9.1 (15.6)	−8.0 (17.6)	−5.3 (22.5)	−3.1 (26.4)	0.9 (33.6)	5.2 (41.4)	7.7 (45.9)	6.9 (44.4)	3.7 (38.7)	−0.8 (30.6)	−3.8 (25.2)	−7.1 (19.2)	−11.8 (10.8)
Record low °C (°F)	−23.4 (−10.1)	−19.2 (−2.6)	−13.4 (7.9)	−8.8 (16.2)	−2.9 (26.8)	−0.5 (31.1)	2.9 (37.2)	1.9 (35.4)	−1.3 (29.7)	−6.0 (21.2)	−10.4 (13.3)	−18.0 (−0.4)	−23.4 (−10.1)
Average precipitation mm (inches)	61.7 (2.43)	53.8 (2.12)	55.0 (2.17)	48.2 (1.90)	62.1 (2.44)	86.3 (3.40)	87.4 (3.44)	83.3 (3.28)	66.9 (2.63)	64.7 (2.55)	63.5 (2.50)	69.2 (2.72)	802.1 (31.58)
Average precipitation days (≥ 1.0 mm)	17.2	16.3	16.0	13.0	14.4	14.4	15.4	14.5	14.2	15.6	17.4	19.1	187.6
Average snowy days (≥ 1.0 cm)	4.0	3.3	0.8	0.1	0	0	0	0	0	0	0.3	2.1	10.6
Average relative humidity (%)	81.8	78.4	72.9	67.2	68.9	70.8	70.9	73.0	77.8	81.5	83.7	83.9	75.9
Mean monthly sunshine hours	54.3	74.8	124.8	172.6	198.7	201.3	207.2	196.6	149.5	104.6	58.9	45.3	1,588.6
Source 1: World Meteorological Organization
Source 2: Data derived from Deutscher Wetterdienst

Cologne has become the first German city with a population of more than a million people to declare climate emergency. The progressing climate change can be seen by looking at the climate data of the previous decade with lower mean temperatures.

Climate data for Cologne/Bonn Airport, 1981–2010 normals
Month	Jan	Feb	Mar	Apr	May	Jun	Jul	Aug	Sep	Oct	Nov	Dec	Year
Mean maximum °C (°F)	12.5 (54.5)	14.0 (57.2)	19.0 (66.2)	23.7 (74.7)	27.7 (81.9)	30.8 (87.4)	32.3 (90.1)	32.0 (89.6)	26.4 (79.5)	21.9 (71.4)	16.4 (61.5)	12.8 (55.0)	34.1 (93.4)
Mean daily maximum °C (°F)	5.4 (41.7)	6.7 (44.1)	10.9 (51.6)	15.1 (59.2)	19.3 (66.7)	21.9 (71.4)	24.4 (75.9)	24.0 (75.2)	19.9 (67.8)	15.1 (59.2)	9.5 (49.1)	5.9 (42.6)	14.8 (58.6)
Daily mean °C (°F)	2.6 (36.7)	2.9 (37.2)	6.3 (43.3)	9.7 (49.5)	14.0 (57.2)	16.6 (61.9)	18.8 (65.8)	18.1 (64.6)	14.5 (58.1)	10.6 (51.1)	6.3 (43.3)	3.3 (37.9)	10.3 (50.5)
Mean daily minimum °C (°F)	−0.6 (30.9)	−0.7 (30.7)	2.0 (35.6)	4.2 (39.6)	8.1 (46.6)	11.0 (51.8)	13.2 (55.8)	12.6 (54.7)	9.8 (49.6)	6.7 (44.1)	3.1 (37.6)	0.4 (32.7)	5.8 (42.4)
Mean minimum °C (°F)	−10.3 (13.5)	−8.9 (16.0)	−5.2 (22.6)	−3.2 (26.2)	1.3 (34.3)	4.7 (40.5)	7.6 (45.7)	6.8 (44.2)	3.5 (38.3)	−0.8 (30.6)	−4.2 (24.4)	−8.3 (17.1)	−13.0 (8.6)
Average precipitation mm (inches)	62.1 (2.44)	54.2 (2.13)	64.6 (2.54)	53.9 (2.12)	72.2 (2.84)	90.7 (3.57)	85.8 (3.38)	75.0 (2.95)	74.9 (2.95)	67.1 (2.64)	67.0 (2.64)	71.1 (2.80)	838.6 (33.02)
Source: Data derived from Deutscher Wetterdienst

=== Flood protection ===
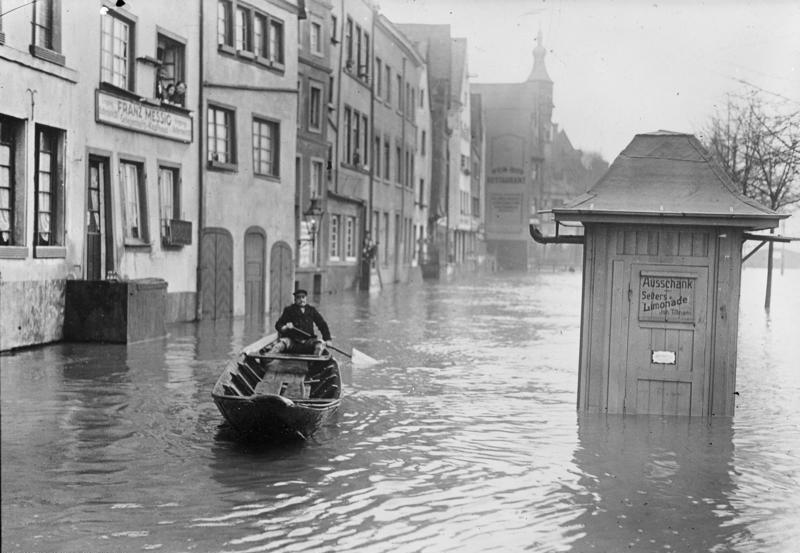
The 1930 flood in Cologne

Cologne is regularly affected by flooding from the Rhine and is considered the most flood-prone European city. A city agency (Stadtentwässerungsbetriebe Köln, "Cologne Urban Drainage Operations") manages an extensive flood control system which includes both permanent and mobile flood walls, protection from rising waters for buildings close to the river banks, monitoring and forecasting systems, pumping stations and programmes to create or protect floodplains and river embankments. The system was redesigned after a 1993 flood, which resulted in heavy damage.

=== Wildlife ===
The dominant wildlife of Cologne is insects, small rodents and several species of birds. Pigeons are the most often seen animals in Cologne, although the number of birds is augmented each year by a growing population of feral exotics, most visibly parrots such as the rose-ringed parakeet. The sheltered climate in southeast North Rhine-Westphalia allows these birds to survive through the winter and, in some cases, they are displacing native species. The plumage of Cologne's green parrots is highly visible even from a distance and contrasts starkly with the otherwise muted colours of the cityscape.

Hedgehogs, rabbits and squirrels are common in parks and the greener parts of town. In the outer suburbs foxes and wild boar can be seen, even during the day.

== Demographics ==
Largest groups of foreign residents
From country	Population (2022)
Turkey	57,135
Italy	21,351
Ukraine	12,634
Poland	9,766
Iraq	8,631
Syria	8,074
Bulgaria	7,916
Greece	5,841
Iran	4,910
Serbia	4,837
Romania	4,786
Russia	4,651
Spain	3,954
Bosnia and Herzegovina	3,830
Croatia	3,539
Portugal	3,263
France	3,043
Kosovo	2,586
Netherlands	2,523
Morocco	2,418
Austria	2,394
China	2,328
United Kingdom	2,287

Historical population

Year	Pop.	±% p.a.
1430	40,000	—
1801	42,024	+0.01%
1840	75,858	+1.53%
1880	144,722	+1.63%
1900	372,229	+4.84%
1910	516,527	+3.33%
1920	657,175	+2.44%
1930	740,082	+1.20%
1940	733,500	−0.09%
1950	603,283	−1.94%
1960	803,616	+2.91%
1965	972,450	+3.89%

Year	Pop.	±% p.a.
1970	1,000,298	+0.57%
1975	986,755	−0.27%
1980	976,694	−0.20%
1985	916,153	−1.27%
1990	953,551	+0.80%
1995	965,697	+0.25%
2000	962,884	−0.06%
2005	983,347	+0.42%
2010	1,007,119	+0.48%
2015	1,060,582	+1.04%
2020	1,083,498	+0.43%
2025	1,025,523	−1.09%

Population size may be affected by changes in administrative divisions.
Source: Landesdatabank Nordrhein-Westfalen (1965-2025)

In the Roman Empire, the city was large and rich with a population of 40,000 in 100–200 AD. The city was home to around 20,000 people in 1000 AD, growing to 50,000 in 1200 AD. The Rhineland metropolis still had 50,000 residents in 1300 AD.

Cologne is the fourth-largest city by population in Germany after Berlin, Hamburg and Munich. As of 31 December 2021, there were 1,079,301 people registered as living in Cologne in an area of 404.99 km^{2} (156.37 sq mi), which makes Cologne the third largest city by area. The population density was 2,700/km^{2} (7,000/sq mi). Cologne first reached the population of 1,000,000 in 1975 due to the incorporation of Wesseling, however this was reversed after public opposition. In 2009 Cologne's population again reached 1,000,000 and it became one of the four cities in Germany with a population exceeding 1 Million. The metropolitan area of the Cologne Bonn Region is home to 3,573,500 living on 4,415/km^{2} (11,430/sq mi). It is part of the polycentric megacity region Rhine-Ruhr with a population of over 11,000,000 people.

There were 551,528 women and 527,773 men in Cologne. In 2021, there were 11,127 births in Cologne; 5,844 marriages and 1,808 divorces, and also 10,536 deaths. In the city, the population was spread out, with 16.3% under the age of 18, and 17.8% were 65 years of age or older. 203 people in Cologne were over the age of 100.

According to the Statistical Office of the City of Cologne, the number of people with a migrant background is at 40.5% (436,660). 2,254 people acquired German citizenship in 2021. In 2021, there were 559,854 households, of which 18.4% had children under the age of 18; 51% of all households were made up of singles. 8% of all households were single-parent households. The average household size was 1.88.

=== Residents with foreign citizenship ===
Cologne residents with a foreign citizenship as of 31 December 2021 is as follows:

Citizenship	Number	%
Total	436,660	100%
Europe	283,960	65%
European Union	138,961	31.8%
Asian	78,235	17.9%
African	29,552	6.8%
American	13,786	3.2%
Australian and Oceanian	666	0.2%

=== Turkish community ===
Cologne is home to 90,000 people of Turkish origin and is the second largest German city with Turkish population after Berlin. Cologne has a Little Istanbul in Keupstraße that has many Turkish restaurants and markets. Famous Turkish-German people like rapper Eko Fresh and TV presenter Nazan Eckes were born in Cologne.

=== Language ===
Colognian or Kölsch (Colognian pronunciation: [kœɫːʃ]) (natively Kölsch Platt) is a small set of very closely related dialects, or variants, of the Ripuarian Central German group of languages. These dialects are spoken in the area covered by the Archdiocese and former Electorate of Cologne reaching from Neuss in the north to just south of Bonn, west to Düren and east to Olpe in the North-West of Germany. Kölsch is one of the very few city dialects in Germany, which also include the dialect spoken in Berlin, for example.

=== Religion ===
As of 2015, 35.5% of the population belonged to the Catholic Church, the largest religious body, and 15.5% to the Protestant Church. Irenaeus of Lyons claimed that Christianity was brought to Cologne by Roman soldiers and traders at an unknown early date. It is known that in the early second century it was a bishop's seat. The first historical Bishop of Cologne was Saint Maternus. Thomas Aquinas studied in Cologne in 1244 under Albertus Magnus. Cologne is the seat of the Archdiocese of Cologne.

According to the 2011 census, 2.1% of the population was Eastern Orthodox, 0.5% belonged of an Evangelical Free Church and 4.2% belonged to further religious communities officially recognised by the state of North Rhine-Westphalia (such as Jehovah's Witnesses).

There are several mosques, including the Cologne Central Mosque run by the Turkish-Islamic Union for Religious Affairs. In 2011, about 11.2% of the population was Muslim.

Cologne also has one of the oldest and largest Jewish communities in Germany. In 2011, 0.3% of Cologne's population was Jewish.

On 11 October 2021, the Mayor of Cologne, Henriette Reker, announced that all of Cologne's 35 mosques would be allowed to broadcast the Adhan (prayer call) for up to five minutes on Fridays between noon and 3 p.m. She commented that the move "shows that diversity is appreciated and loved in Cologne".

== Government and politics ==
The city's administration is headed by the mayor and the three deputy mayors.

=== Political traditions and developments ===
The long tradition of a free imperial city, which long dominated an exclusively Catholic population and the age-old conflict between the church and the bourgeoisie (and within it between the patricians and craftsmen) have created its own political climate in Cologne. Various interest groups often form networks beyond party boundaries. The resulting web of relationships, with political, economic and cultural links with each other in a system of mutual favours, obligations and dependencies, is called the 'Cologne coterie'. This has often led to an unusual proportional distribution in the city government and degenerated at times into corruption: in 1999, a "waste scandal" over kickbacks and illegal campaign contributions came to light, which led not only to the imprisonment of the entrepreneur Hellmut Trienekens, but also to the downfall of almost the entire leadership of the ruling Social Democrats.

=== Mayor ===
Results of the second round of the 2025 mayoral election.

The incumbent Lord Mayor of Cologne is Torsten Burmester of the SPD. He received 53.51% of the vote at the runoff election.

The most recent mayoral election was held on 14 September 2025, with a runoff held on 28 September. The results were as follows:

Candidate	Party	First round		Second round	
Candidate	Party	Votes	%	Votes	%
Torsten Burmester	Social Democratic Party	97,791	21.3	192,198	53.5
Berivan Aymaz	The Greens	128,932	28.1	166,996	46.5
Markus Greitemann	CDU	89,263	19.5		
Matthias Büschges	Alternative for Germany	38,882	8.5		
Heiner Kockerbeck	The Left	28,054	6.12		
Mark Bennecke	Die PARTEI	16,197	3.5		
Hans Mörtter	Independent	15,830	3.5		
Volker Görzel	Free Democratic Party	13,552	3.0		
Roberto Champione	Cologne City Society	11,656	2.5		
Lars Wolfram	Volt Germany	11,585	2.5		
Inga Feuser	Good & Climate Friends	3,303	0.7		
Heike Herden	Party of Progress	2,513	0.6		
Ali Güçlü	Independent	915	0.2		
Valid votes		458,473	99.3	359,194	99.4
Invalid votes		3,044	0.7	1,964	0.5
Total		461,517	100.0	361,158	100.0
Electorate/voter turnout		809,416	57.02	807,675	44.72
Source: City of Cologne ()

=== City council ===
Results of the 2025 city council election.

The Cologne city council (Kölner Stadtrat) governs the city alongside the mayor. It serves a term of five years. The most recent city council election was held on 14 September 2025. The results were as follows:

Party	Votes	%	+/-	Seats	+/-
Alliance 90/The Greens (Grüne)	114,881	25.0	▼3.5	22	▼4
Christian Democratic Union (CDU)	91,326	19.89	▼1.6	18	▼1
Social Democratic Party (SPD)	91,283	19.88	▼1.7	18	▼1
The Left (Die Linke)	49,703	10.8	▲4.4	10	▲4
Alternative for Germany (AfD)	41,828	9.1	▲4.7	8	▲4
Volt Germany (Volt)	23,081	5.0	±0	5	▲1
Free Democratic Party (FDP)	17,779	3.9	▼1.4	3	▼2
Sahra Wagenknecht Alliance (BSW)	8.933	2.0	New	2	New
Die PARTEI (PARTEI)	8,136	1.8	▼0.7	2	±0
Cologne City Society (KSG)	5,948	1.3	New	1	New
Good & Climate Friends (GUT&KLIMA)	5,481	1.2	New	1	New
Grassroots Democratic Party of Germany (dieBasis)	455	0.1	New	0	New
Liberal Democrats (LD)	122	0.0	New	0	New
German Communist Party (DKP)	54	0.0	New	0	New
Independent Yan	30	0.0	New	0	New
Independent Güçlü	26	0.0	New	0	New
Independent Przybylski	23	0.0	New	0	New
Valid votes	459,089	99.4			
Invalid votes	2,575	0.6			
Total	461,664	100.0		90	±0
Electorate/voter turnout	809,416	57.0	▲5.6		
Source: City of Cologne

=== State Landtag ===
Results of the 2022 state election in Cologne

In the Landtag of North Rhine-Westphalia, Cologne is divided among seven constituencies. After the 2022 North Rhine-Westphalia state election, the composition and representation of each was as follows:

Constituency	Area	Party	Member
13 Köln I	Rodenkirchen and part of Innenstadt	Grüne	Eileen Woestmann
14 Köln II	Lindenthal	Grüne	Frank Jablonski
15 Köln III	Ehrenfeld and part of Nippes	Grüne	Arndt Klocke
16 Köln IV	Chorweiler and most of Nippes	SPD	Lena Teschlade
17 Köln V	Porz and the east of Kalk	CDU	Florian Braun
18 Köln VI	Most of Innenstadt and the west of Kalk	Grüne	Berivan Aymaz
19 Köln VII	Mülheim	SPD	Carolin Kirsch

=== Federal parliament ===
In the Bundestag, Cologne is divided among four constituencies. In the 21st Bundestag, elected 23 February 2025, the composition and representation of each was as follows:

Constituency	Area	Party	Member
92 Cologne I	Porz, Kalk and part of Innenstadt	SPD	Sanae Abdi
93 Cologne II	Rodenkirchen, Lindenthal and part of Innenstadt	Grüne	Sven Lehmann
94 Cologne III	Ehrenfeld, Nippes and Chorweiler	Grüne	Katharina Dröge
100 Leverkusen – Cologne IV	Mülheim (and the city of Leverkusen)	SPD	Karl Lauterbach

== Cityscape ==
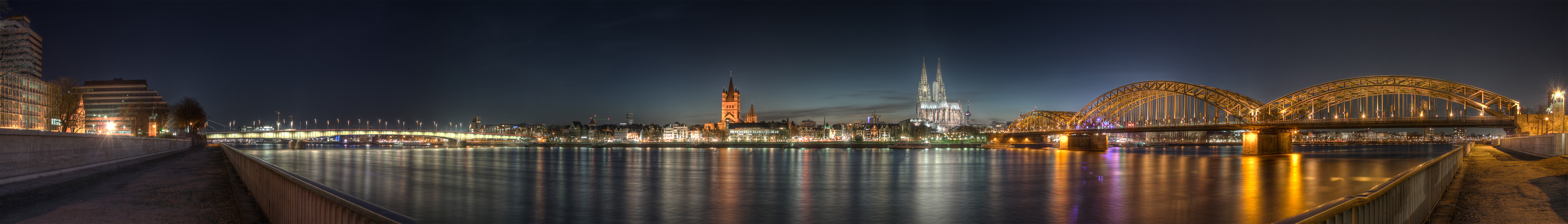
Panoramic view of the city at night as seen from Deutz; from left to right: Deutz Bridge; Great St Martin Church; Cologne Cathedral; and Hohenzollern Bridge

The inner city of Cologne was largely destroyed during World War II. The reconstruction of the city followed the style of the 1950s, while respecting the old layout and naming of the streets. Thus, the city centre today is characterised by modern architecture, with a few interspersed pre-war buildings which were reconstructed due to their historical importance. Some buildings of the "Wiederaufbauzeit" (era of reconstruction), for example, the opera house by Wilhelm Riphahn, are nowadays regarded as classics of modern architecture. Nevertheless, the uncompromising style of the Cologne Opera house and other modern buildings has remained controversial.

The districts outside the city centre consist mostly of 19th and 20th century buildings. Around 25% of Cologne was built before 1945.

Green areas account for over a quarter of Cologne, which is approximately 75 m^{2} (807.29 sq ft) of public green space for every inhabitant.

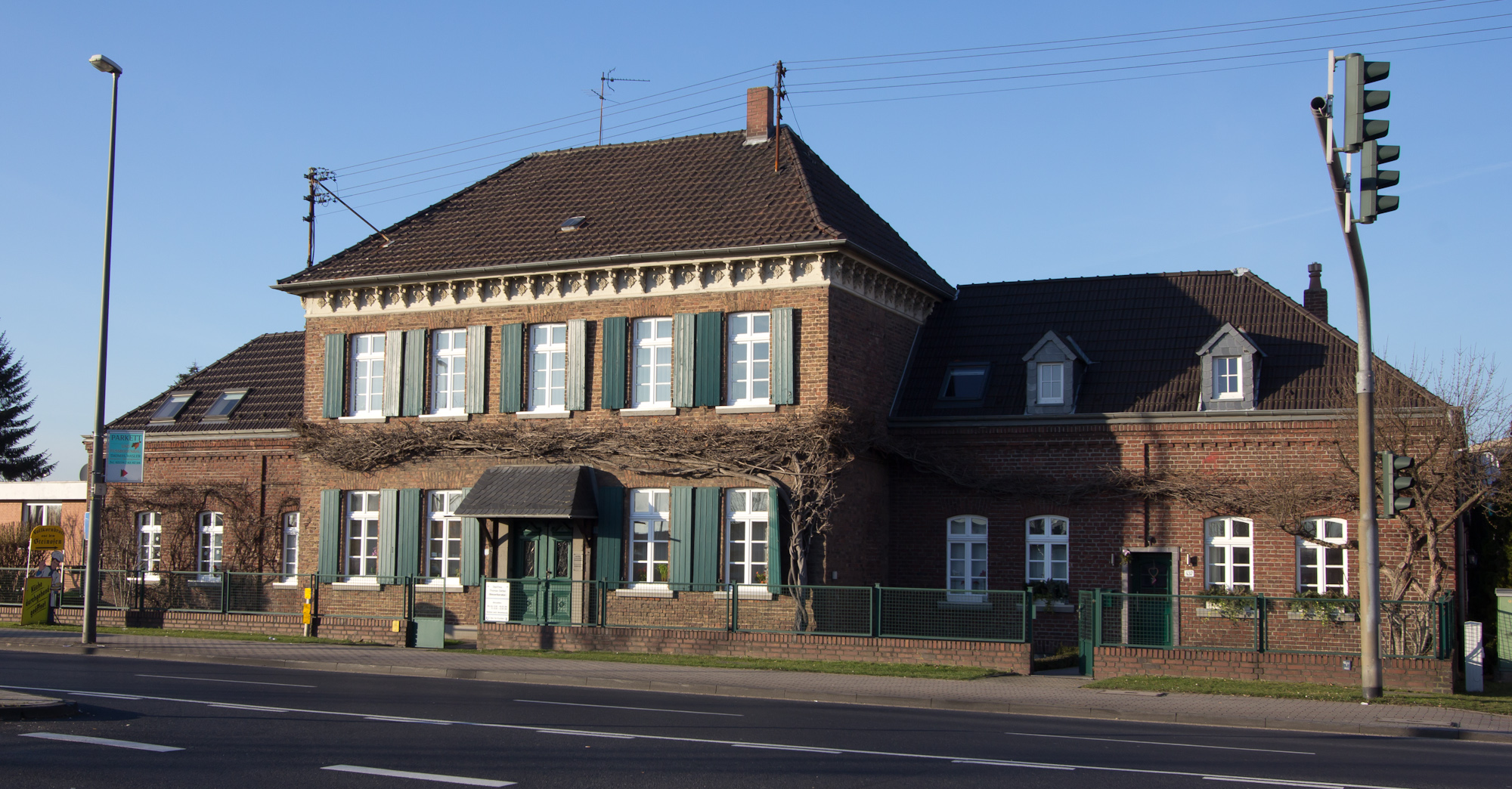
Junkersdorf old town

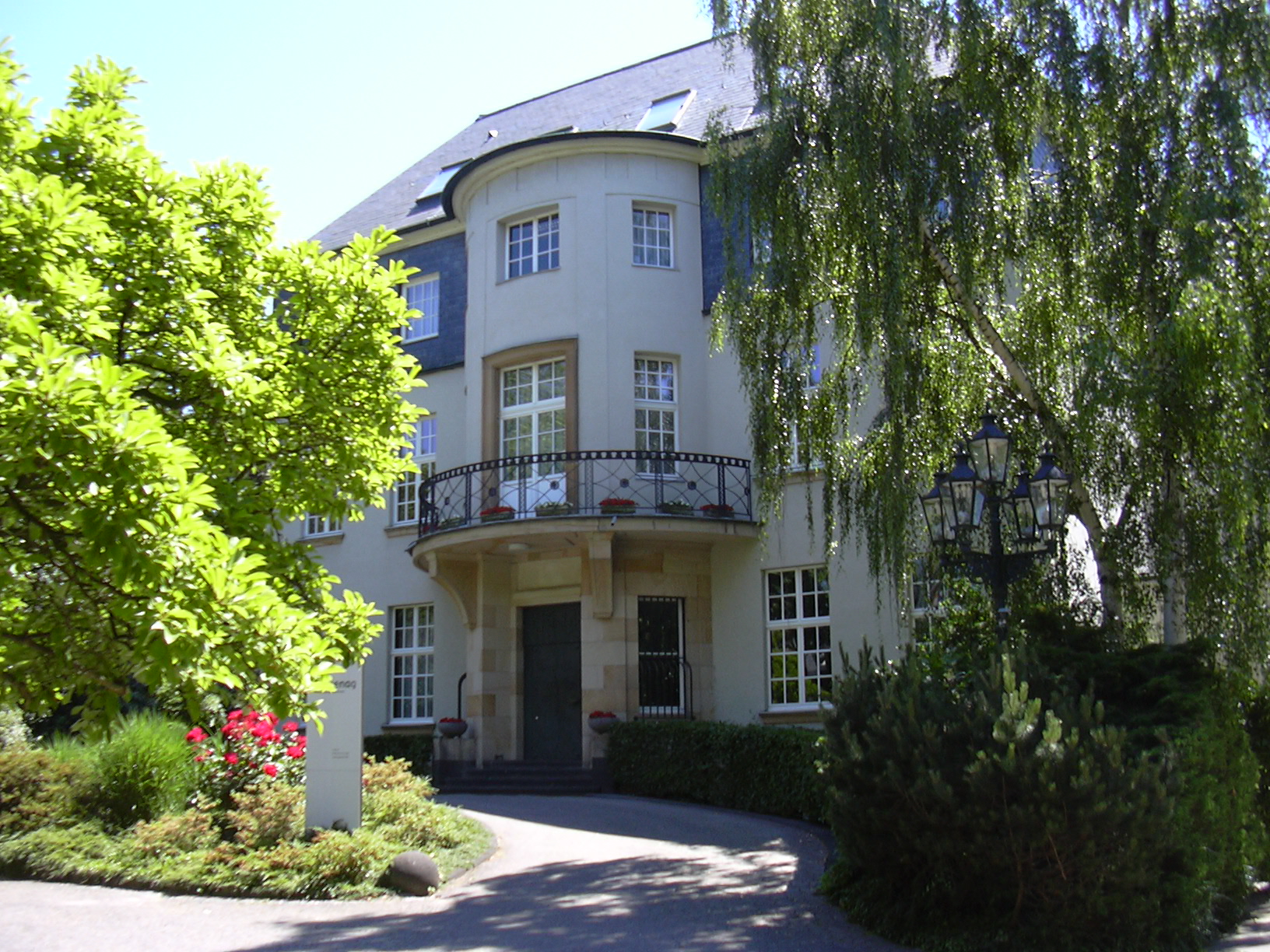
Art Nouveau villa on Bayenthal-gürtel

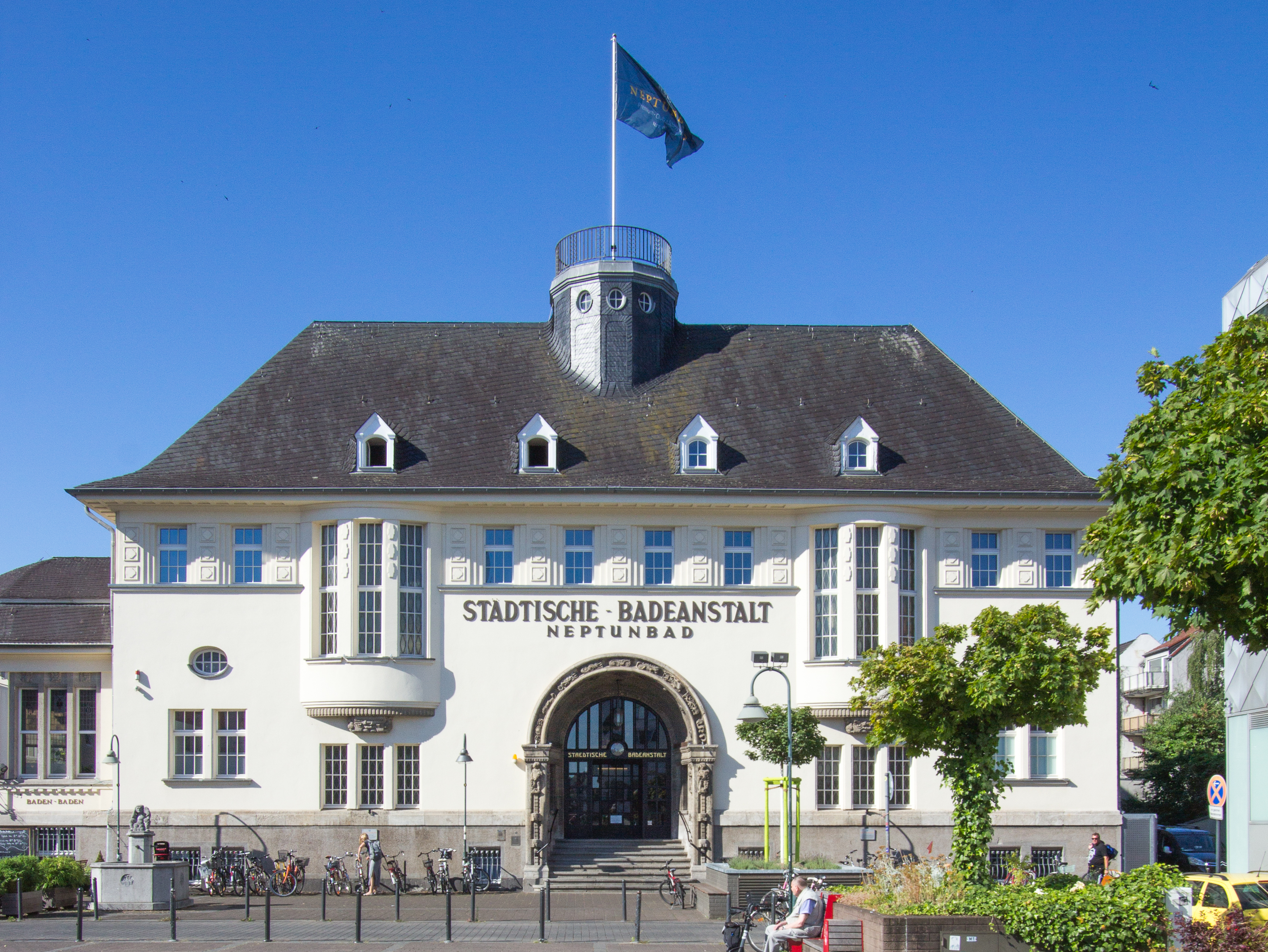
Gründerzeit building in Ehrenfeld, Cologne

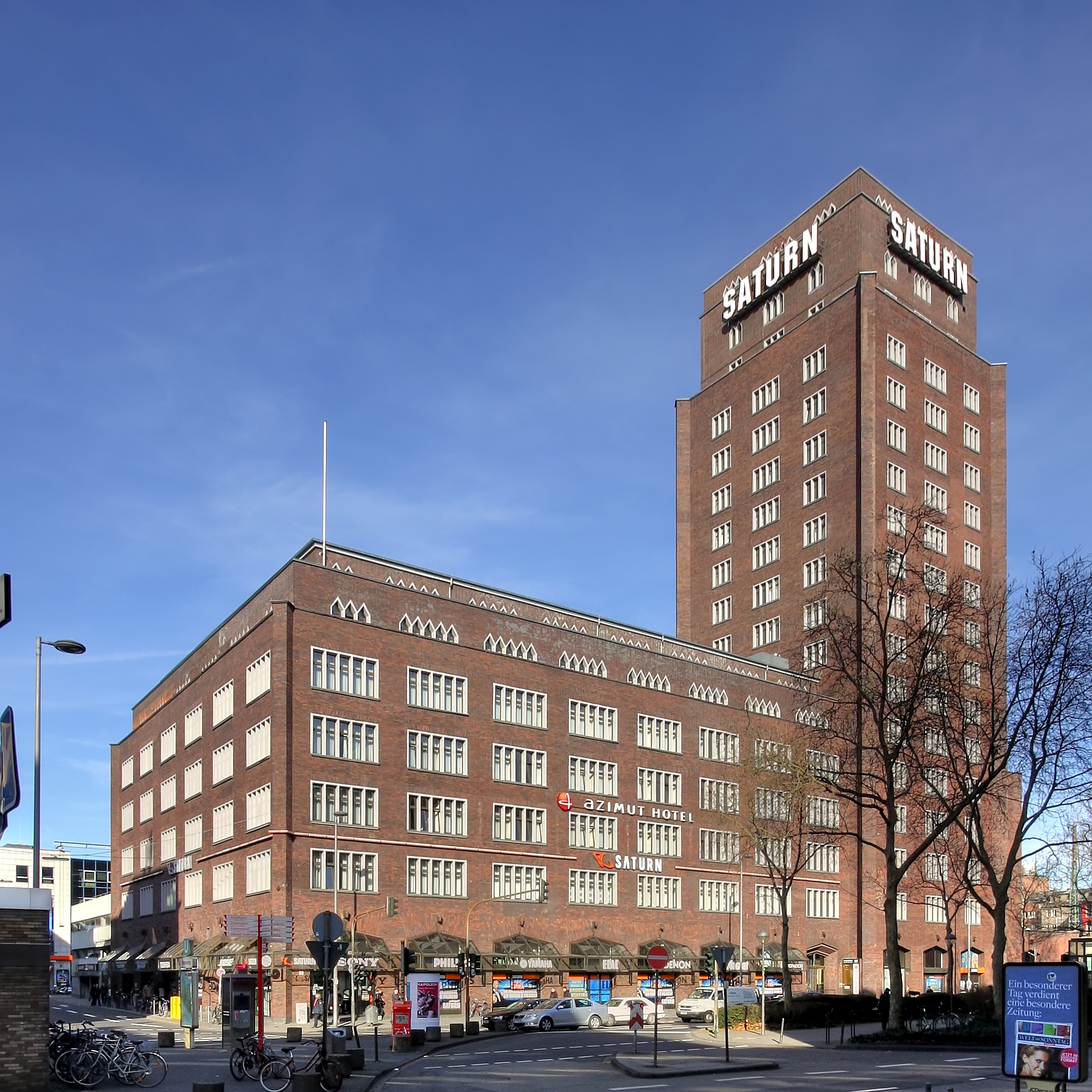
Hansahochhaus, a building in the style of Brick Expressionism

=== Landmarks ===
==== Churches ====
- Cologne Cathedral (German: Kölner Dom) is the city's most famous monument and the Cologne residents' most loved landmark. It is a Gothic church, started in 1248 and completed in 1880. In 1996, it was designated a World Heritage Site; it houses the Shrine of the Three Kings, which supposedly contains the relics of the Three Magi (see also). Residents of Cologne sometimes refer to the cathedral as "the eternal construction site" (die ewige Baustelle).
- Twelve Romanesque churches: These buildings are outstanding examples of early medieval church architecture. The origins of some of these churches go back as far as Roman times. St Gereon, for example, was originally a huge mausoleum in a Roman graveyard, and St Maria im Kapitol was built on the substructure of a Roman temple. Great St Martin Church stands on the site of Roman warehouses and previously a sports field with a swimming pool, the walls of which can be seen in the basement of the church. With the exception of St Maria Lyskirchen all of these churches were very badly damaged during World War II. Reconstructions of the last ones were only finished in the 1990s.
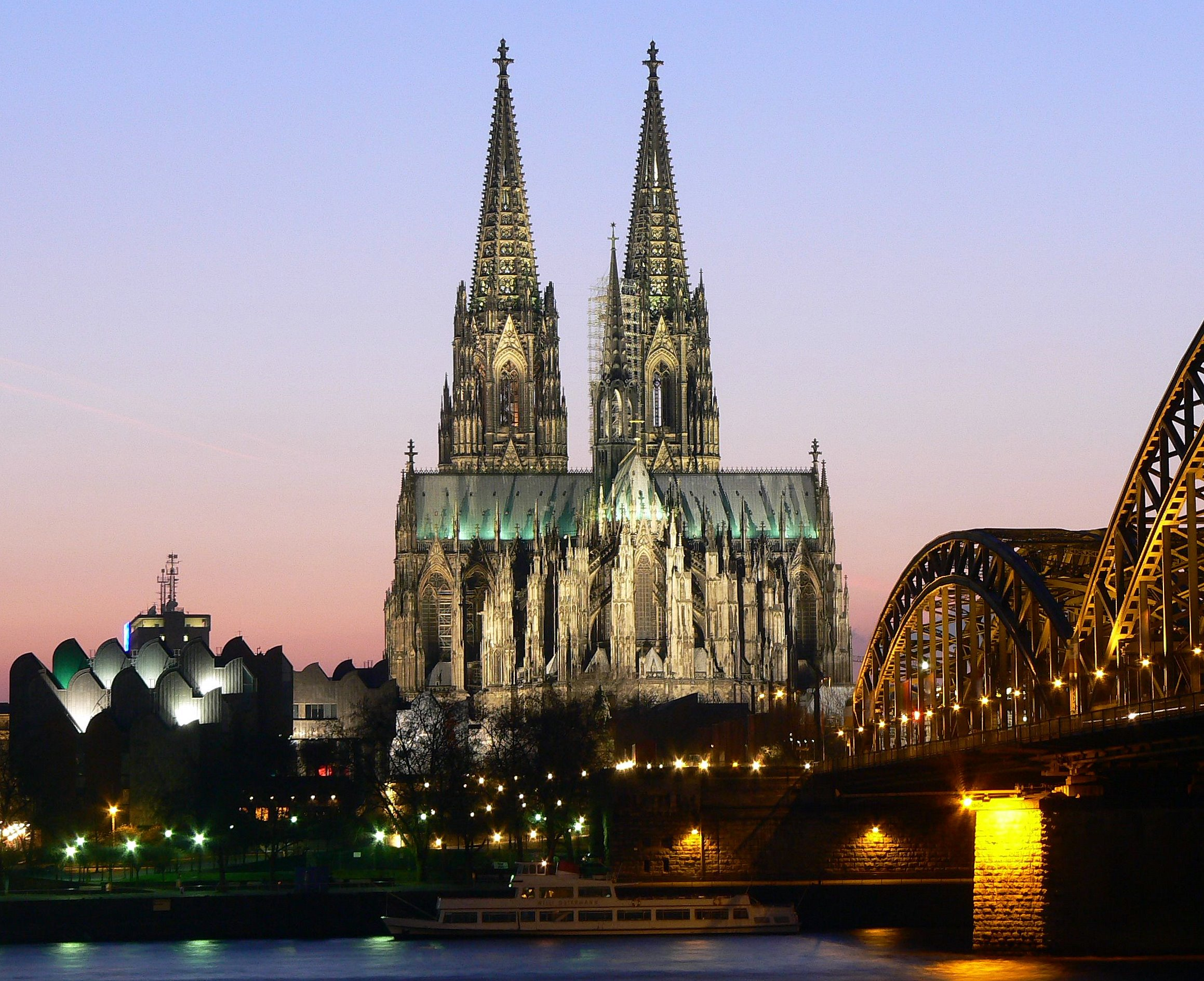
Cologne Cathedral

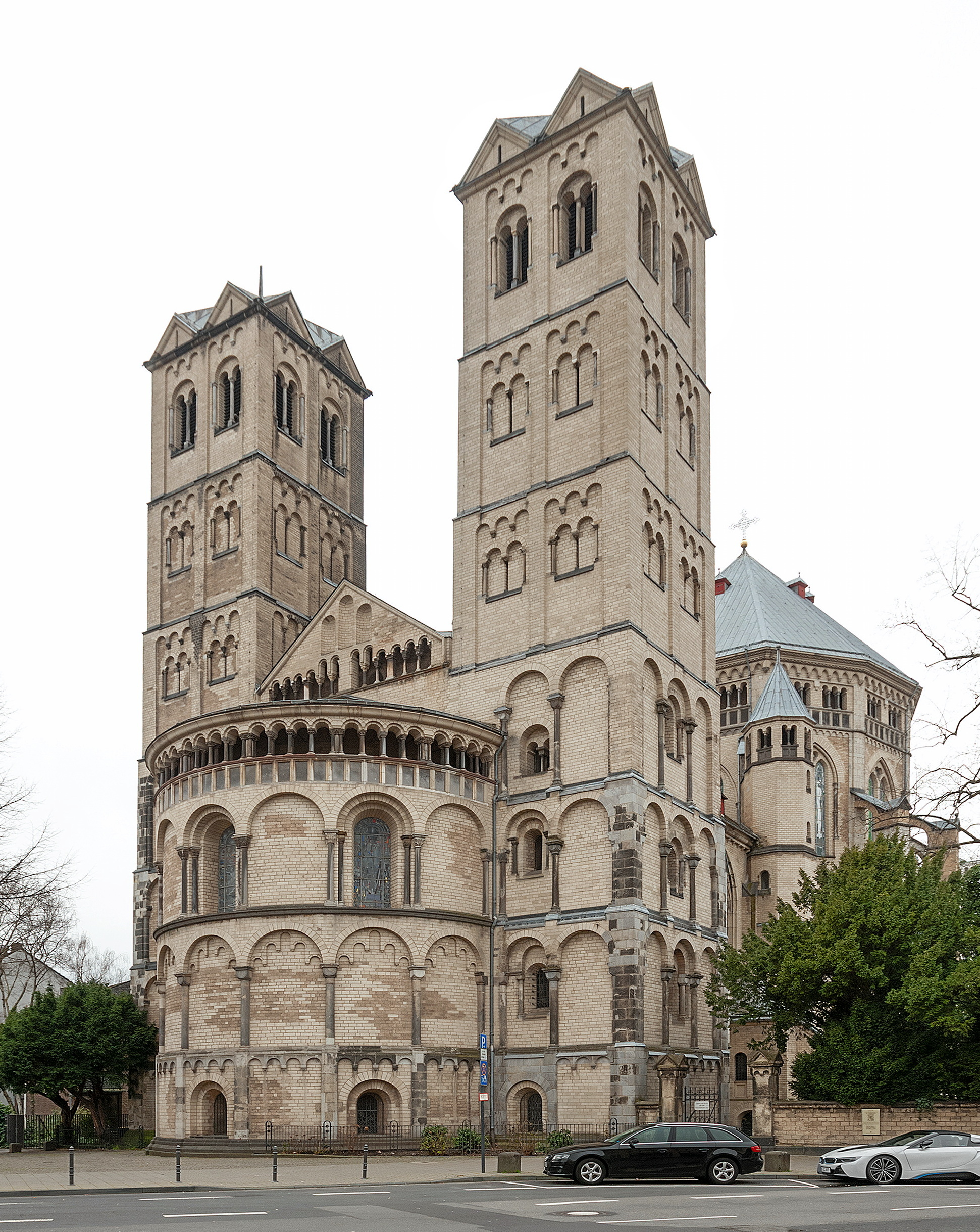
St Gereon's Basilica

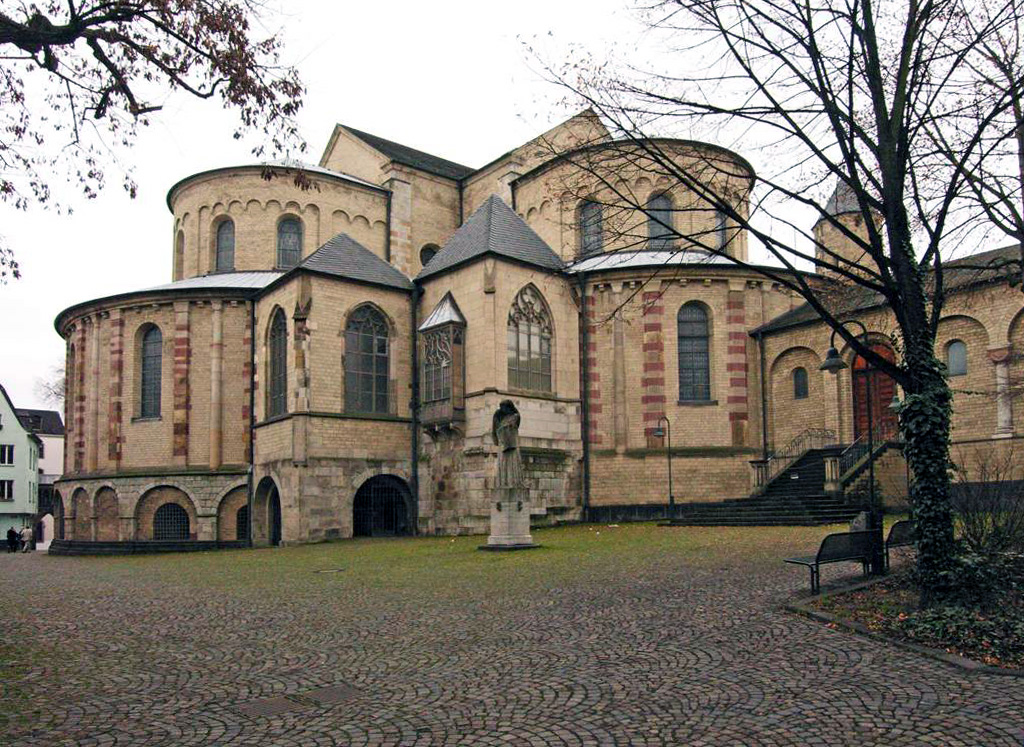
St Maria im Kapitol

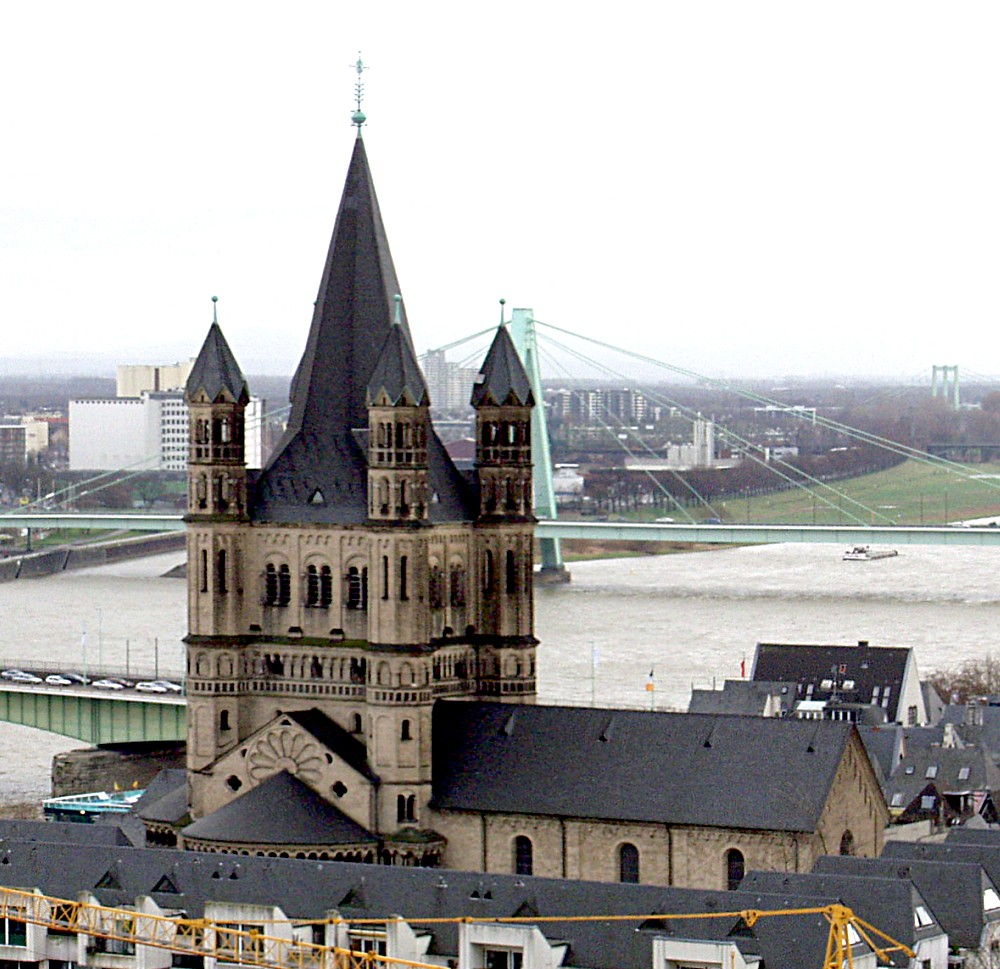
Great St Martin Church

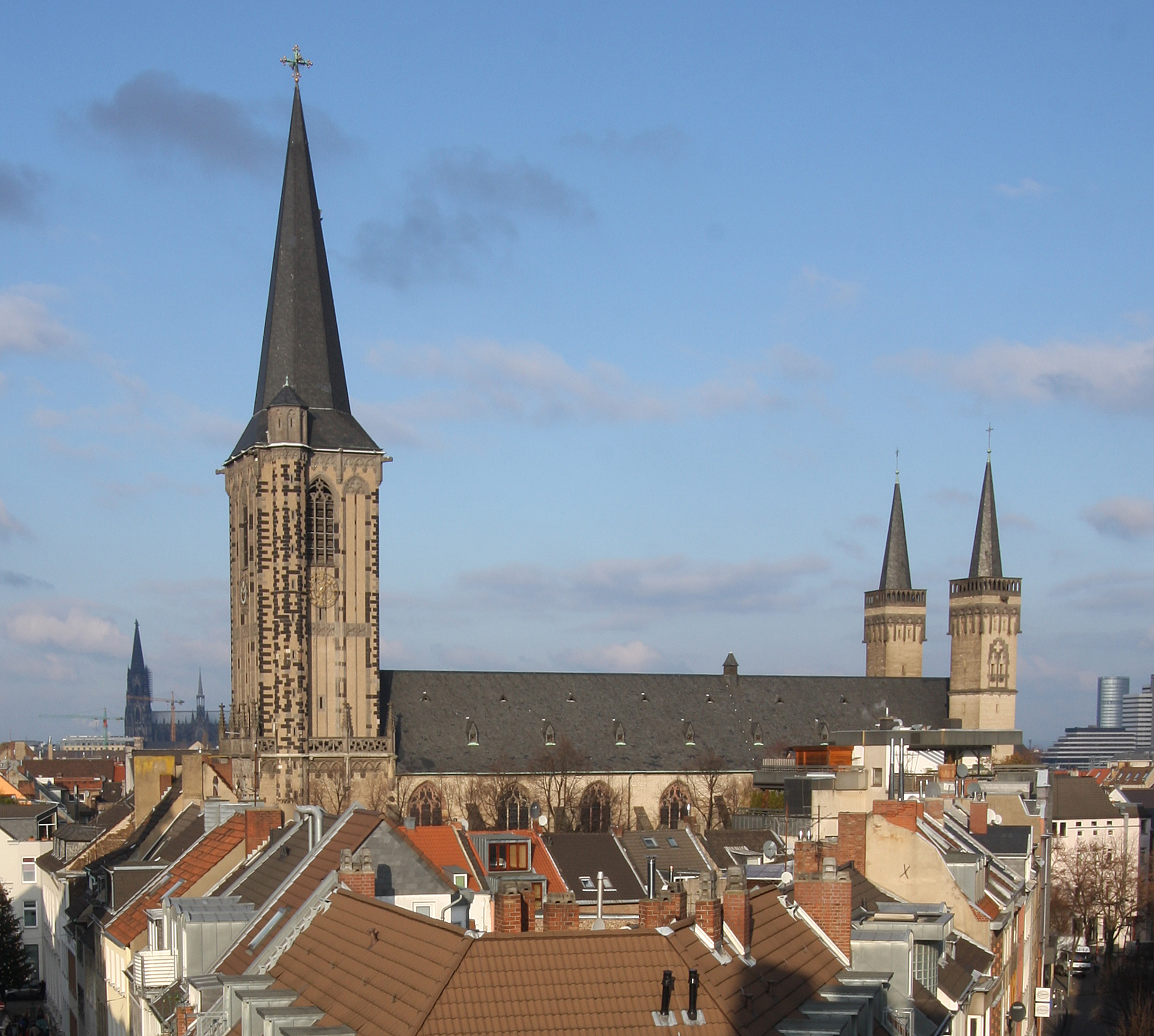
Basilica of St Severin

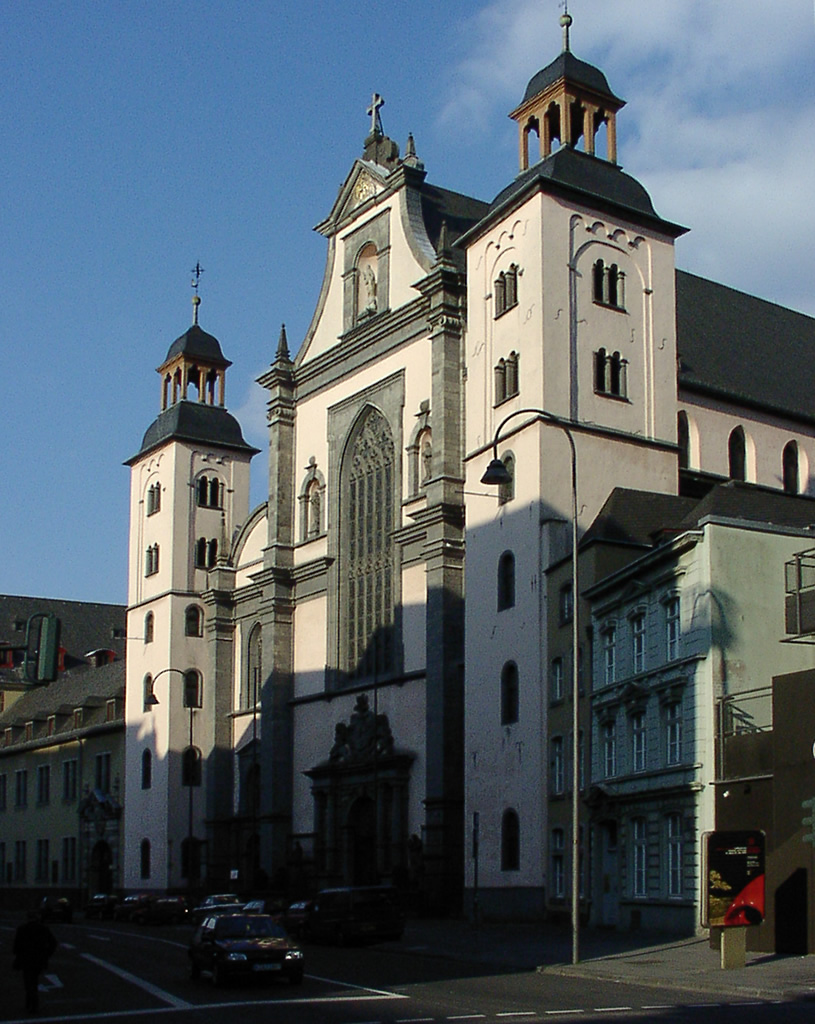
Church of the Assumption

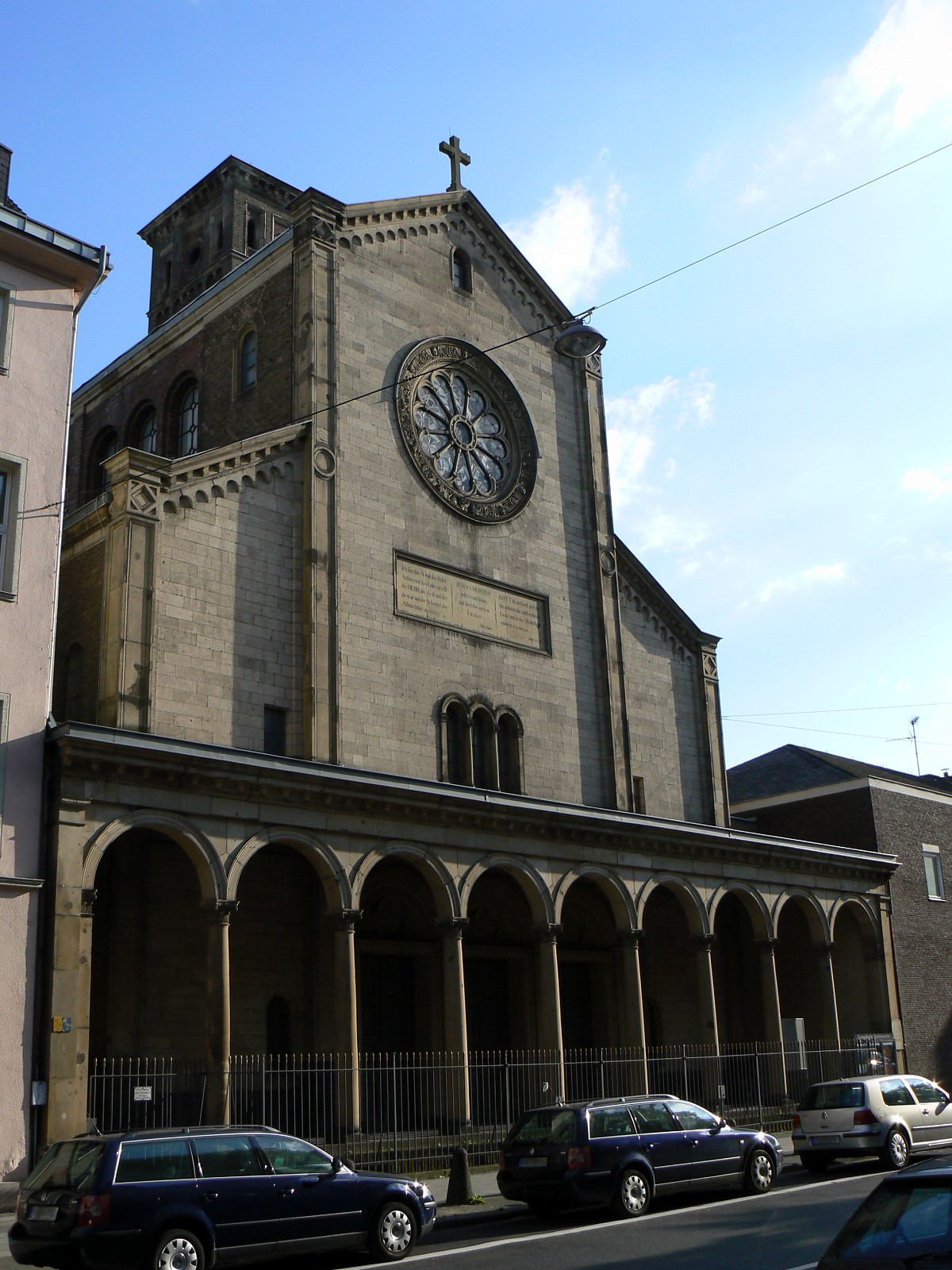
Trinity Church

==== Medieval houses ====
The Cologne City Hall (Kölner Rathaus), founded in the 12th century, is the oldest city hall in Germany still in use. The Renaissance-style loggia and tower were added in the 15th century. Other famous buildings include the Gürzenich, Haus Saaleck and the Overstolzenhaus.

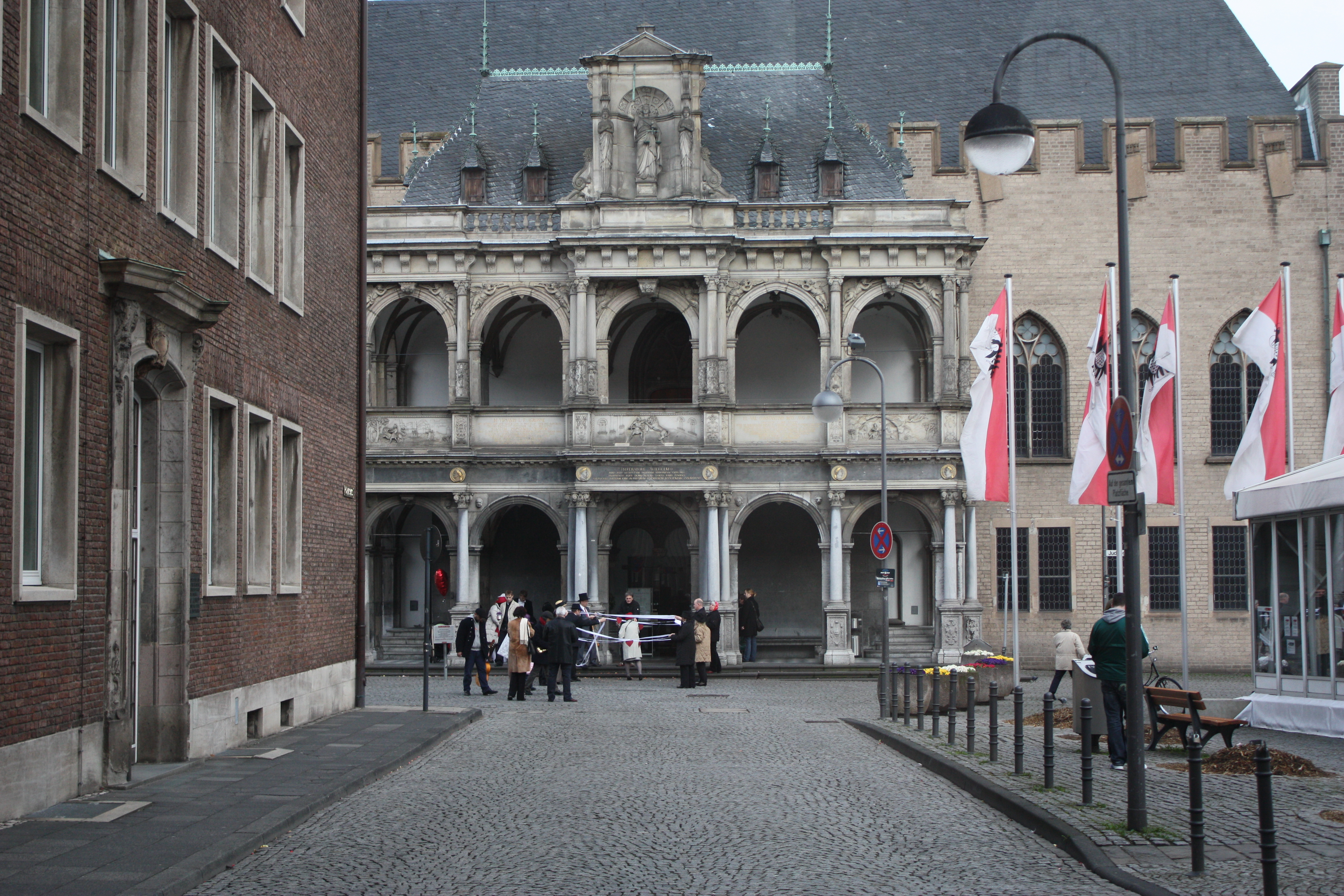
Cologne City Hall

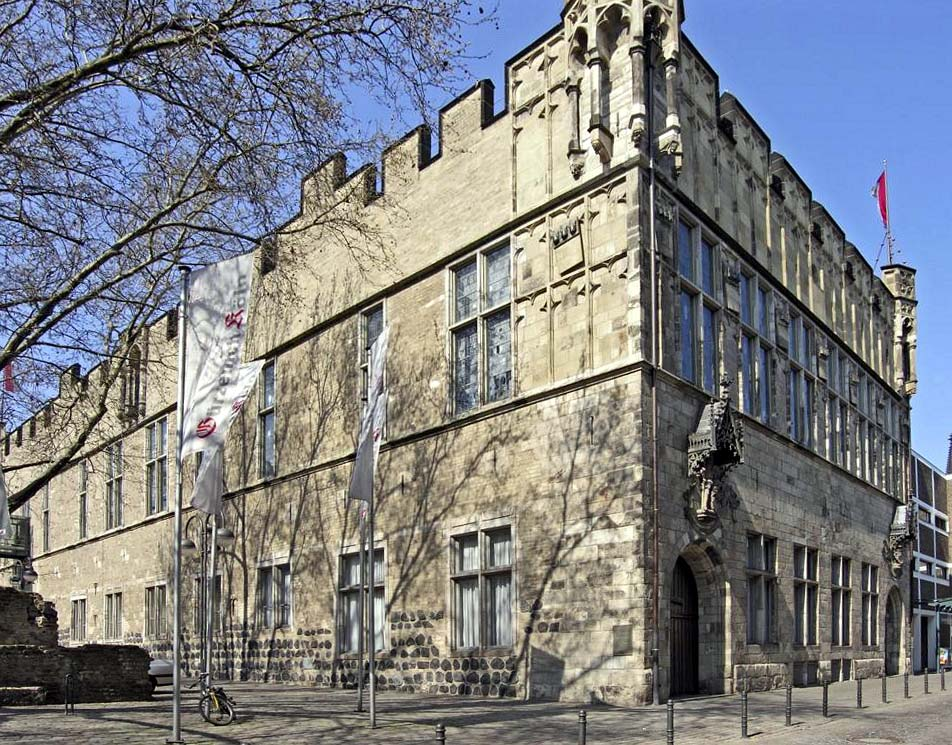
Gürzenich

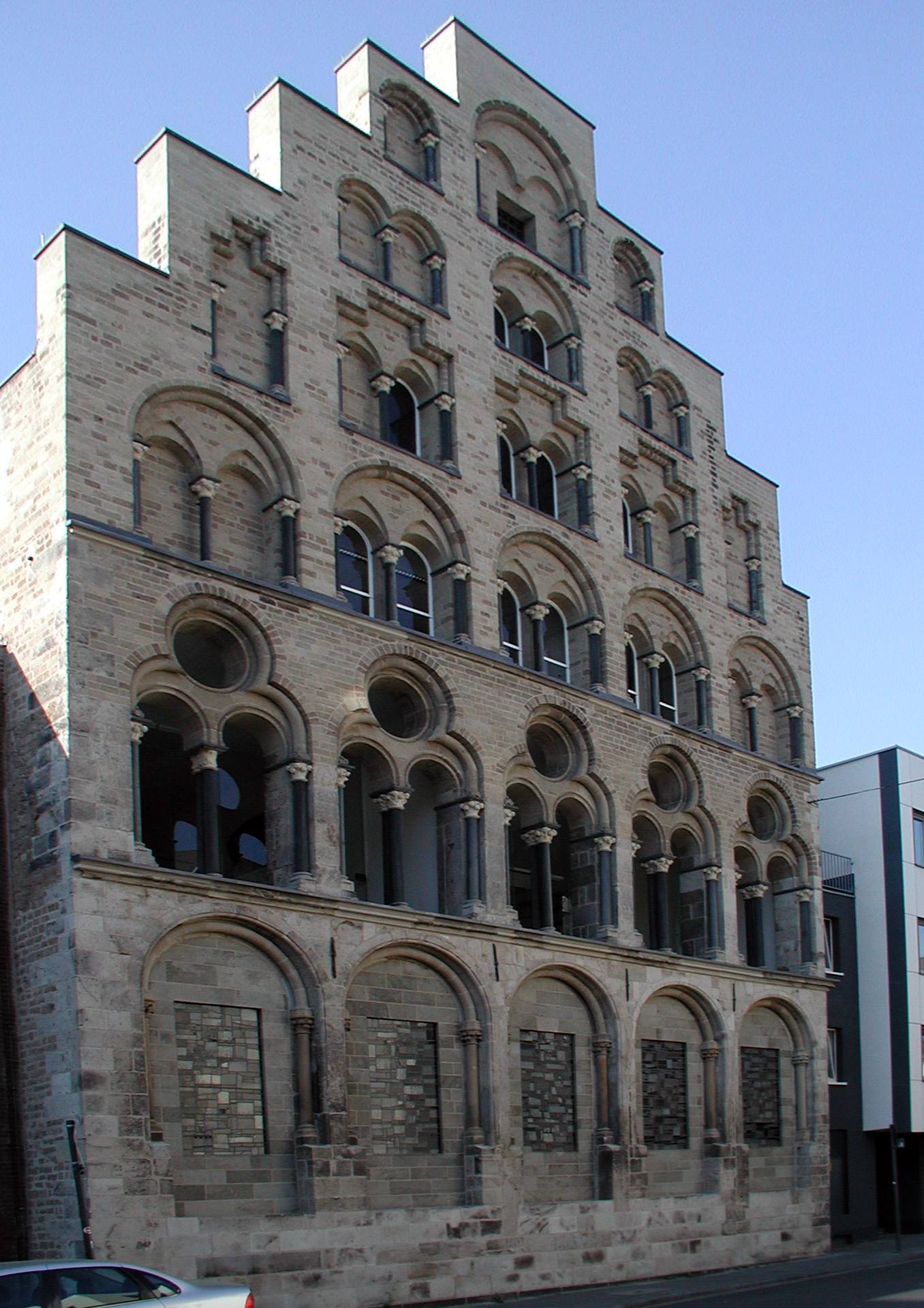
Overstolzenhaus

==== Medieval city gates ====
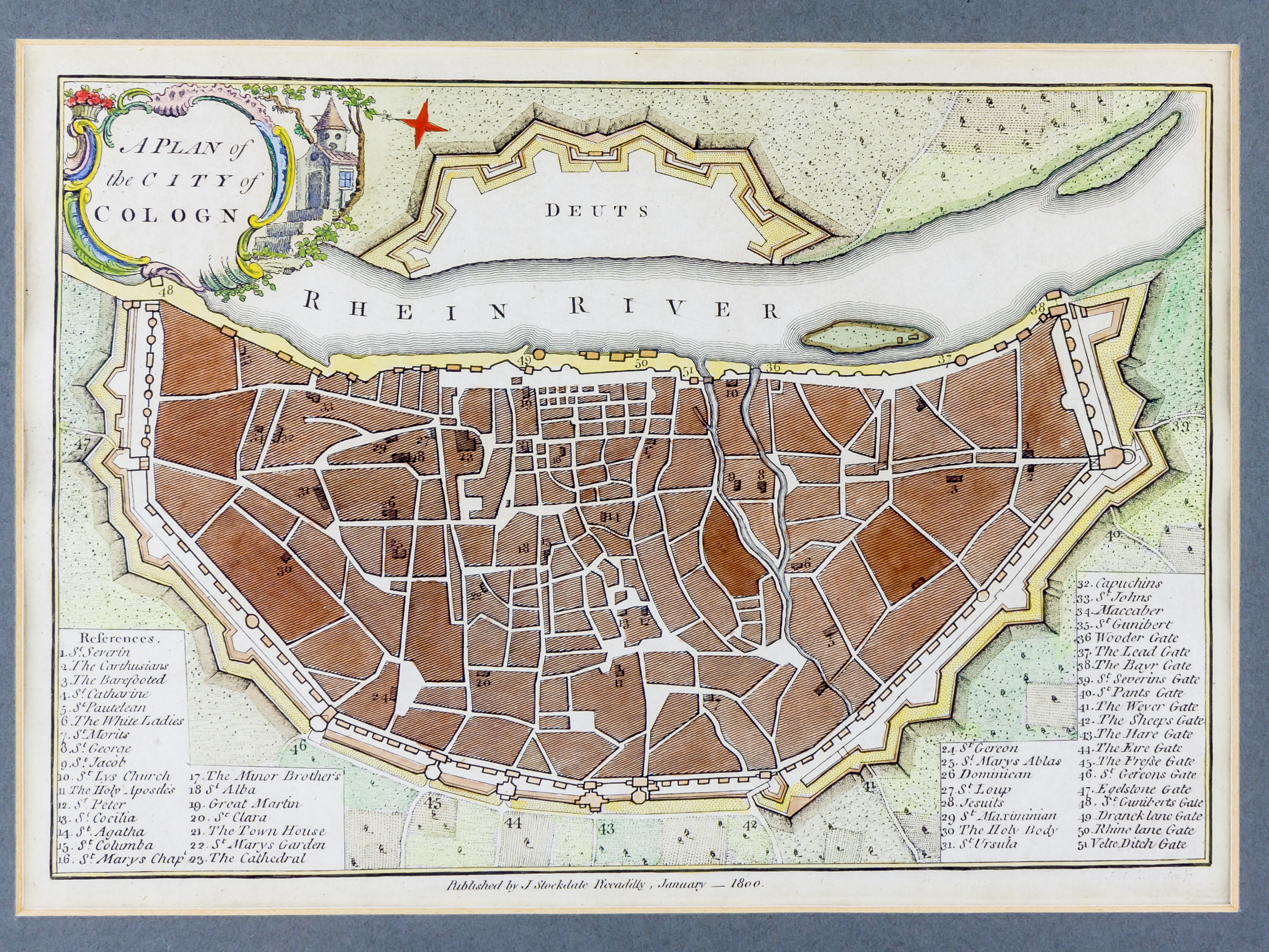
A plan published in 1800 shows the medieval city wall still intact, locating 16 gates (Nr. 36–51 in the legend), e.g., 47: Eigelsteintor, 43: Hahnentor, 39: Severinstor.

Of the twelve medieval city gates that once existed, only the Eigelsteintorburg at Ebertplatz, the Hahnentor at Rudolfplatz and the Severinstorburg at Chlodwigplatz still stand today.

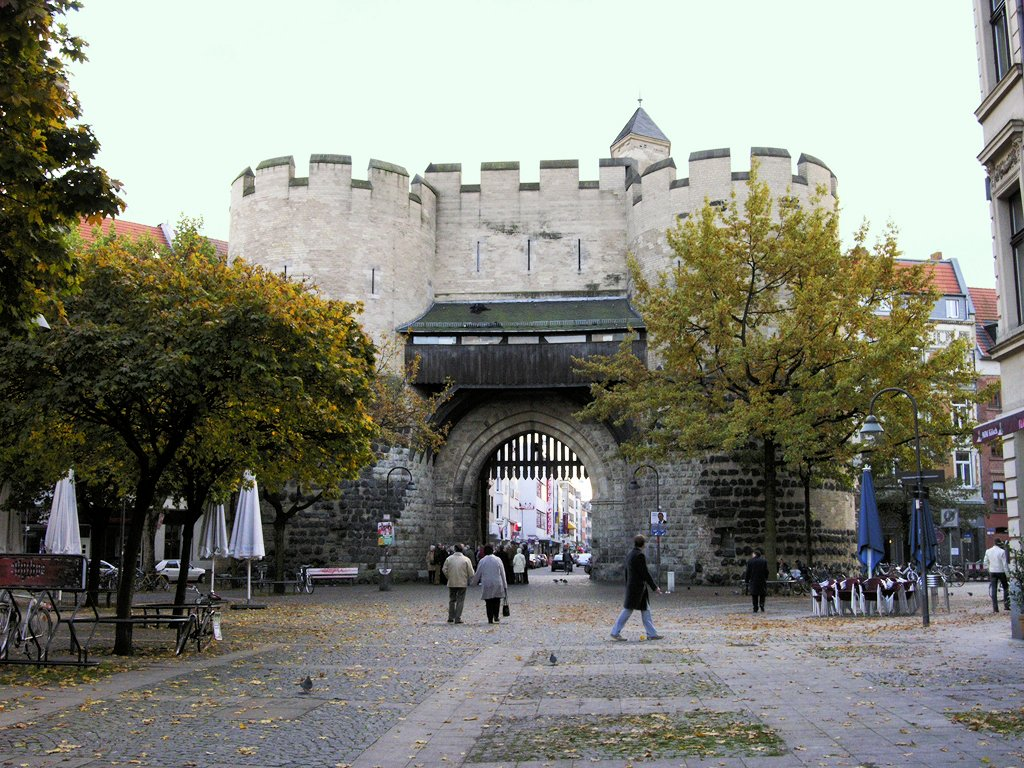
Eigelsteintor

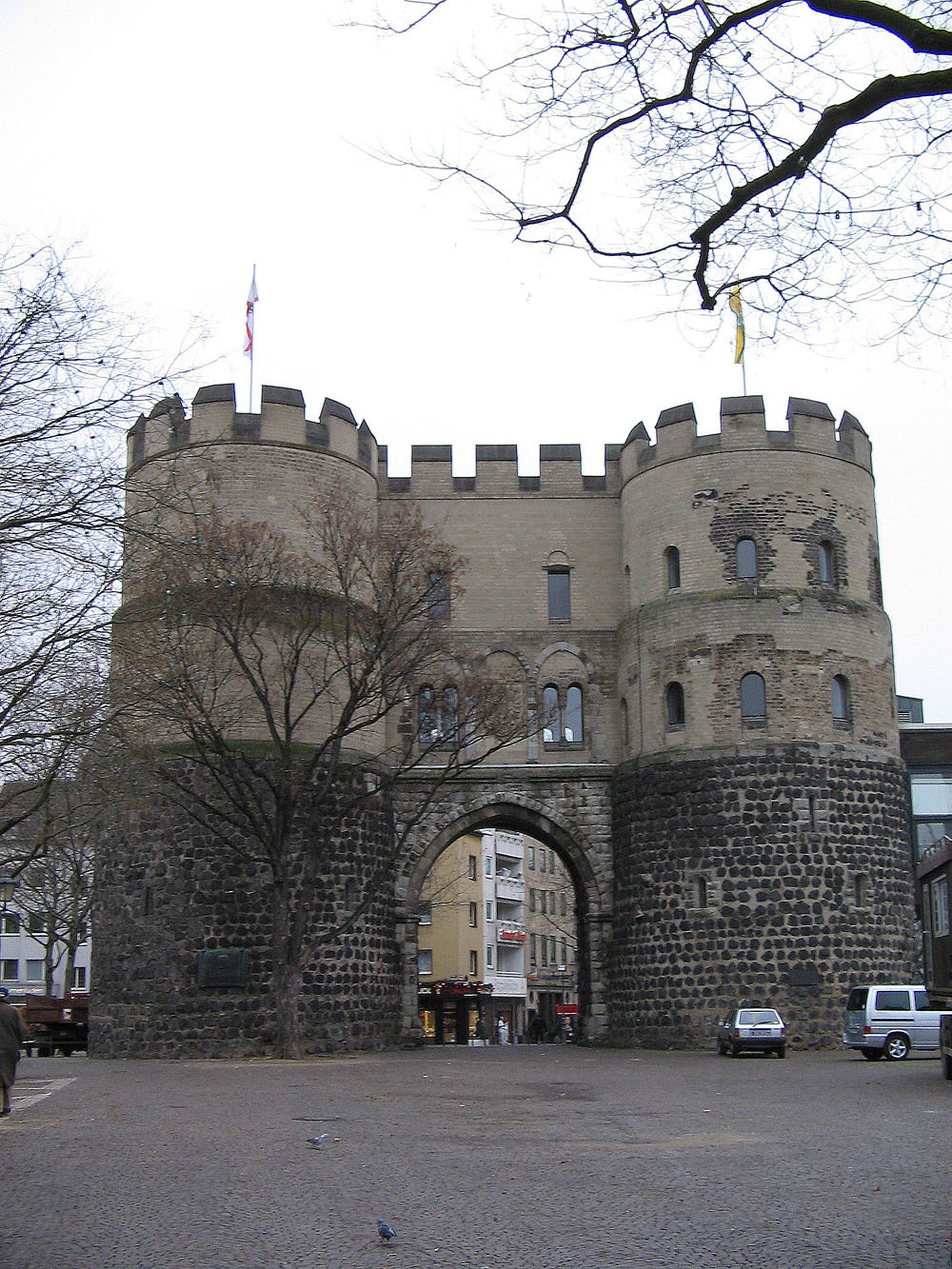
Hahnentor

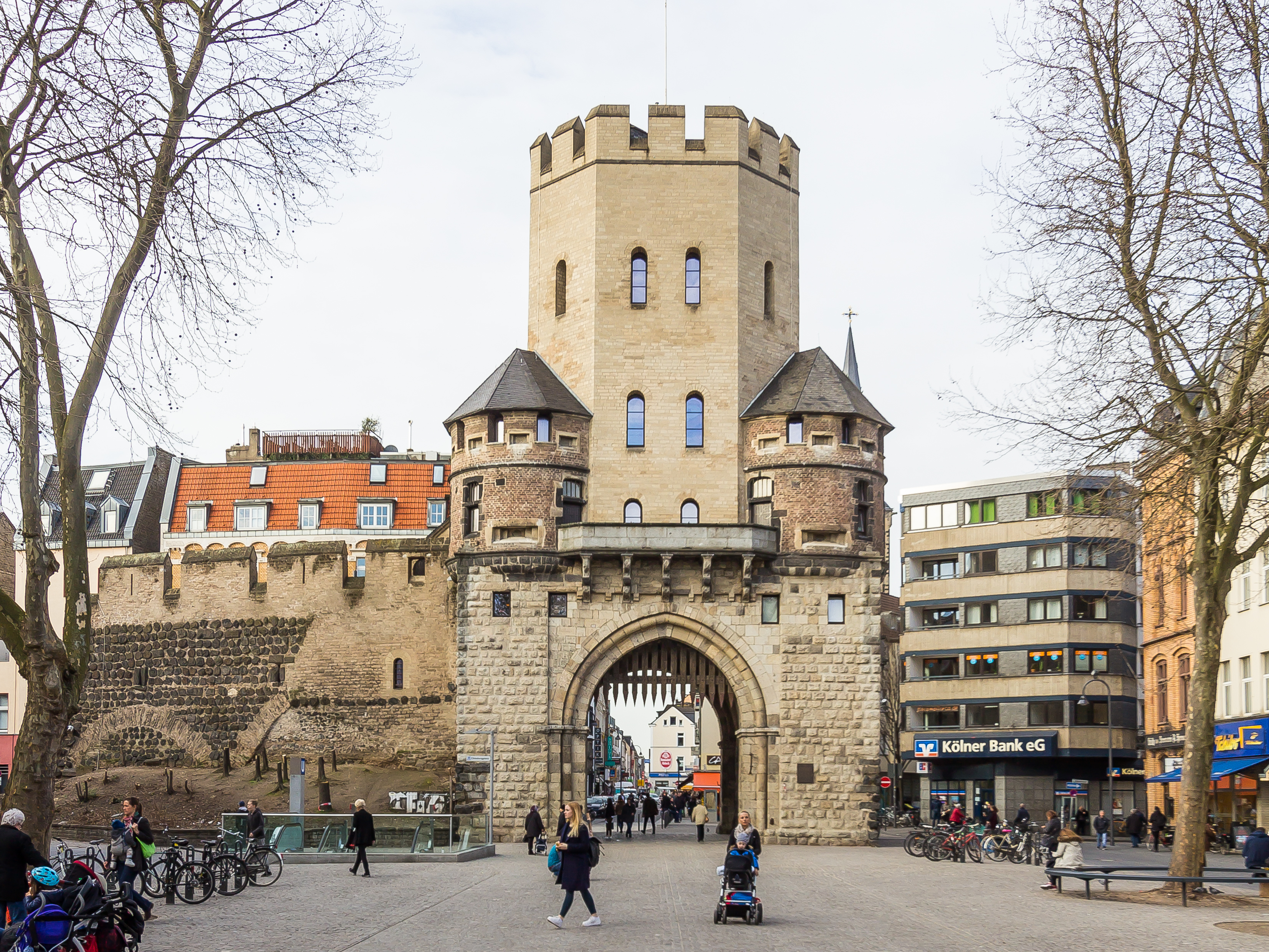
Severinstor

=== Streets ===
- The Cologne Ring boulevards (such as Hohenzollernring, Kaiser-Wilhelm-Ring, Hansaring) with their medieval city gates (such as Hahnentorburg on Rudolfplatz) are also known for their night life.
- Hohe Straße (literally: High Street) is one of the main shopping areas and extends past the cathedral in an approximately southerly direction. The street contains many gift shops, clothing stores, fast food restaurants and electronic goods dealers.
- Schildergasse – connects Neumarkt square at its western end to the Hohe Strasse shopping street at its eastern end and has been named the busiest shopping street in Europe with 13,000 people passing through every hour, according to a 2008 study by GfK.
- Ehrenstraße – the shopping area around Apostelnstrasse, Ehrenstrasse and Rudolfplatz is a little more on the quirky and stylish side.

=== Bridges ===
Several bridges cross the Rhine in Cologne. They are (from south to north): the Rodenkirchen Bridge, South Bridge (railway), Severin Bridge, Deutz Bridge, Hohenzollern Bridge (railway), Zoo Bridge (Zoobrücke) and Mülheim Bridge. In particular the iron tied arch Hohenzollern Bridge (Hohenzollernbrücke) is a dominant landmark along the river embankment. A Rhine crossing of a special kind is provided by the Cologne Cable Car (German: Kölner Seilbahn), a cableway that runs across the river between the Cologne Zoological Garden in Riehl and the Rheinpark in Deutz.

=== High-rise structures ===
Cologne's tallest structure is the Colonius telecommunication tower at 266 m or 873 ft. The observation deck has been closed since 1992. A selection of the tallest buildings in Cologne is listed below. Other tall structures include the Hansahochhaus (designed by architect Jacob Koerfer and completed in 1925 – it was at one time Europe's tallest office building), the Kranhaus buildings at Rheinauhafen and the Messeturm Köln ("trade fair tower").

Skyscraper	Image	Height in metres	Floors	Year	Address	Notes
KölnTurm		148.5	43	2001	MediaPark 8, Neustadt-Nord	(literally: Cologne Tower), Cologne's second tallest building at 165.48 metres (542.91 ft) in height. The 30th floor of the building has a restaurant and a terrace with 360° views of the city.
Colonia-Hochhaus		147	45	1973	An der Schanz 2, Riehl	tallest building in Germany from 1973 to 1976. Today, it is still the country's second tallest residential building.
Rheintower		138	34	1980	Raderberggürtel, Marienburg	former headquarters of Deutsche Welle, since 2007 under renovation with the new name Rheintower Köln-Marienburg.
Uni-Center		133	45	1973	Luxemburger Straße, Sülz	
TÜV Rheinland		112	22	1974	Am Grauen Stein, Poll	
Ringturm		109	26	1973	Ebertplatz, Neustadt-Nord	
Justizzentrum Köln		105	25	1981	Luxemburger Straße, Sülz	
KölnTriangle		103	29	2006	Ottoplatz 1, Deutz	opposite to the cathedral with a 103 m (338 ft) high viewing platform and a view of the cathedral over the Rhine.
Herkules-Hochhaus		102	31	1969	Graeffstraße 1, Ehrenfeld	

== Culture ==
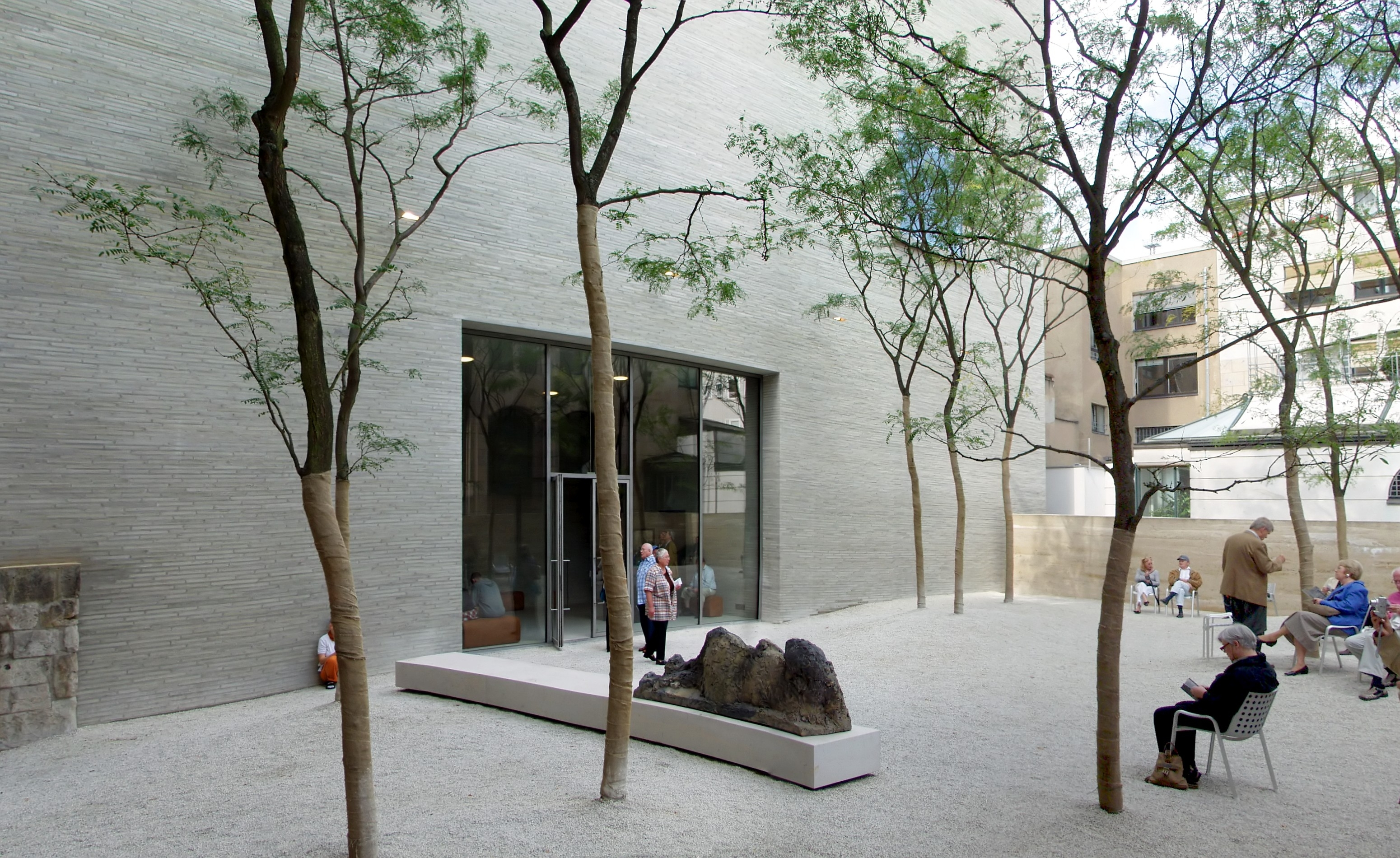
Courtyard of the Kolumba museum in 2007, designed by Peter Zumthor

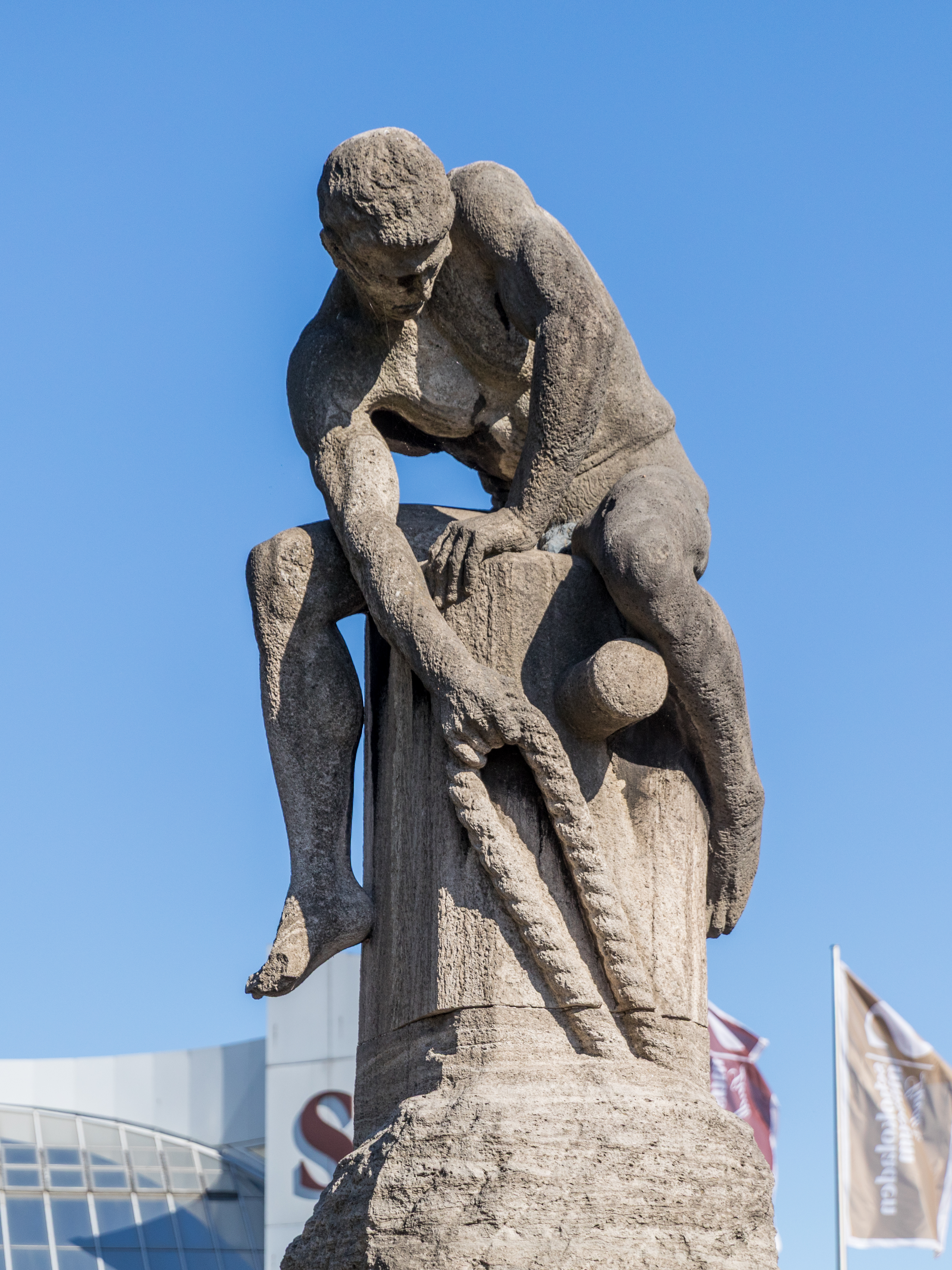
Tauzieher, a limestone sculpture by Nikolaus Friedrich, 1911

Cologne has numerous museums. The famous Roman-Germanic Museum features art and architecture from the city's distant past; the Museum Ludwig houses one of the most important collections of modern art in Europe, including a Picasso collection matched only by the museums in Barcelona and Paris. The Museum Schnütgen of religious art is partly housed in St Cecilia, one of Cologne's Twelve Romanesque churches. Many art galleries in Cologne enjoy a worldwide reputation like e.g. Galerie Karsten Greve, one of the leading galleries for postwar and contemporary art.

Cologne has more than 60 music venues and the third-highest density of music venues of Germany's four largest cities, after Munich and Hamburg and ahead of Berlin.

Several orchestras are active in the city, among them the Gürzenich Orchestra, which is also the orchestra of the Cologne Opera and the WDR Symphony Orchestra Cologne (German State Radio Orchestra), both based at the Cologne Philharmonic Orchestra Building (Kölner Philharmonie). Other orchestras are the Musica Antiqua Köln, the WDR Rundfunkorchester Köln and WDR Big Band, and also several choirs, including the WDR Rundfunkchor Köln. Cologne was also an important hotbed for electronic music in the 1950s (Studio für elektronische Musik, Karlheinz Stockhausen) and again from the 1990s onward. The public radio and TV station WDR was involved in promoting musical movements such as Krautrock in the 1970s; the influential Can was formed there in 1968. There are several centres of nightlife, among them the Kwartier Latäng (the student quarter around the Zülpicher Straße) and the nightclub-studded areas around Hohenzollernring, Friesenplatz and Rudolfplatz.

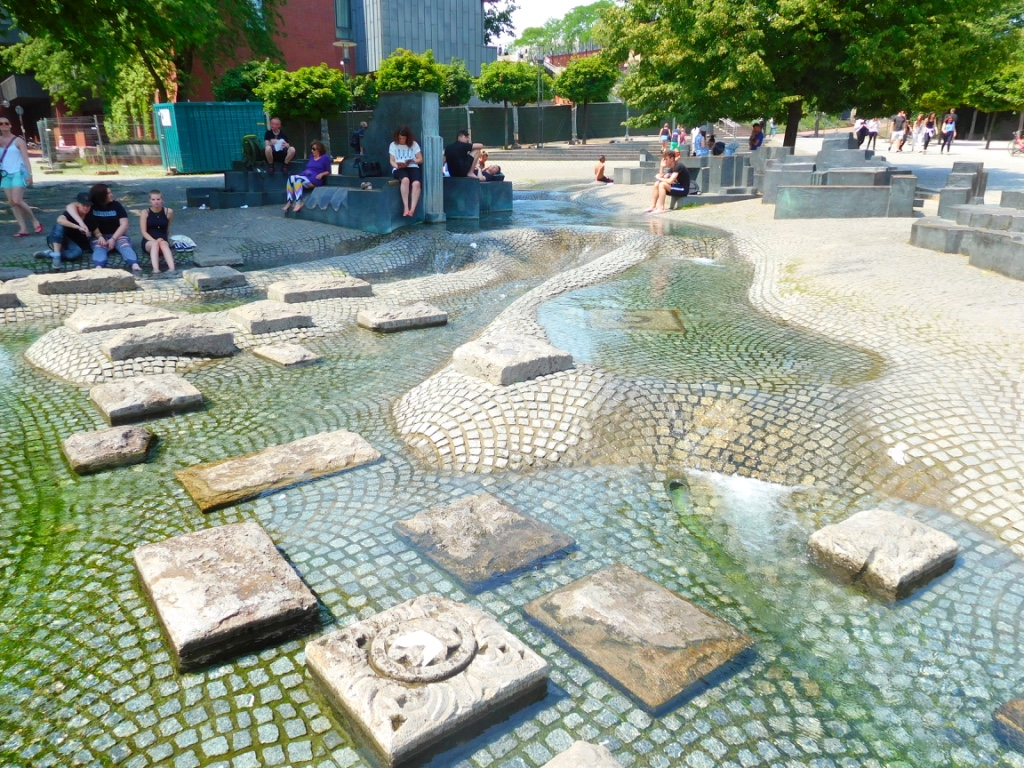
Water feature in Cologne, summer 2017

The large annual literary festival lit.COLOGNE with its Silberschweinpreis features regional and international authors. The main literary figure connected with Cologne is the writer Heinrich Böll, winner of the Nobel Prize for Literature. Since 2012, there is also an annual international festival of philosophy called phil.cologne.

The city also has the most pubs per capita in Germany. Cologne is well known for its beer, called Kölsch. Kölsch is also the name of the local dialect. This has led to the common joke of Kölsch being the only language one can drink.

Cologne is also famous for Eau de Cologne (German: Kölnisch Wasser; lit: "Water of Cologne"), a perfume created by Italian expatriate Johann Maria Farina at the beginning of the 18th century. During the 18th century, this perfume became increasingly popular, was exported all over Europe by the Farina family and Farina became a household name for Eau de Cologne. In 1803 Wilhelm Mülhens entered into a contract with an unrelated person from Italy named Carlo Francesco Farina who granted him the right to use his family name and Mühlens opened a small factory at Cologne's Glockengasse. In later years, after various court battles, his grandson Ferdinand Mülhens was forced to abandon the name Farina for the company and their product. He decided to use the house number given to the factory at Glockengasse during the French occupation in the early 19th century, 4711. Today, original Eau de Cologne is still produced in Cologne by both the Farina family, in the eighth generation and by Mäurer & Wirtz who bought the 4711 brand in 2006.

=== Carnival ===
The Cologne carnival is one of the largest street festivals in Europe. In Cologne, the carnival season officially starts on 11 November at 11 minutes past 11 AM with the proclamation of the new Carnival Season and continues until Ash Wednesday. However, the so-called "Tolle Tage" (crazy days) do not start until Weiberfastnacht (Women's Carnival) or, in dialect, Wieverfastelovend, the Thursday before Ash Wednesday, which is the beginning of the street carnival. Zülpicher Strasse and its surroundings, Neumarkt square, Heumarkt and all bars and pubs in the city are crowded with people in costumes dancing and drinking in the streets. Hundreds of thousands of visitors flock to Cologne during this time. Generally, around a million people celebrate in the streets on the Thursday before Ash Wednesday.

=== Rivalry with Düsseldorf ===
Cologne and Düsseldorf have a "fierce regional rivalry", which includes carnival parades, ice hockey, football and beer. People in Cologne prefer Kölsch while people in Düsseldorf prefer Altbier ("Alt"). Waiters and patrons will "scorn" and make a "mockery" of people who order Alt beer in Cologne or Kölsch in Düsseldorf. The rivalry has been described as a "love–hate relationship". The Köln Guild of Brewers was established in 1396. The Kölsch beer style first appeared in the 1800s and in 1986 the breweries established an appellation under which only breweries in the city are allowed to use the term Kölsch.

=== Museums ===
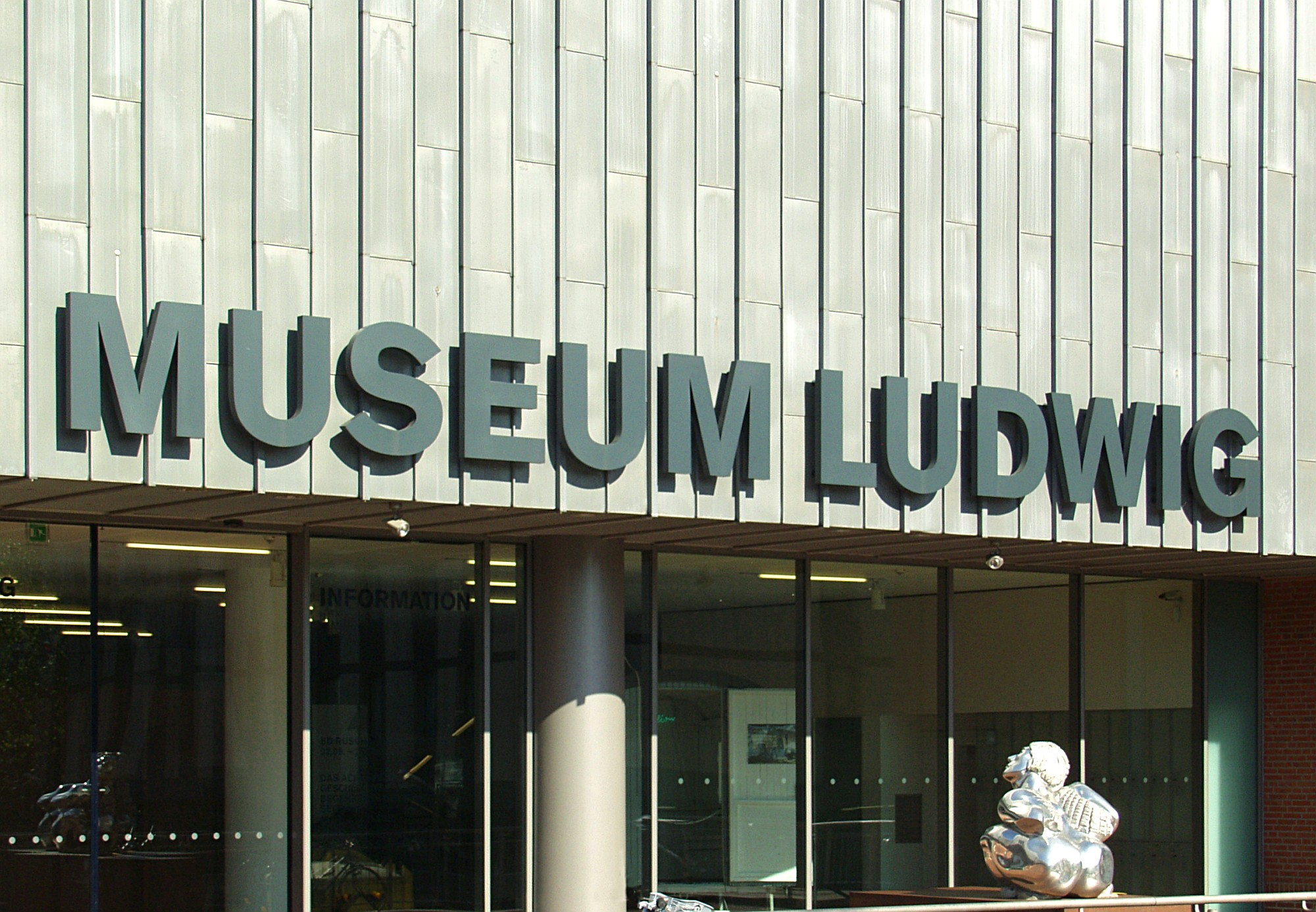
The Museum Ludwig houses one of the most important collections of modern art.

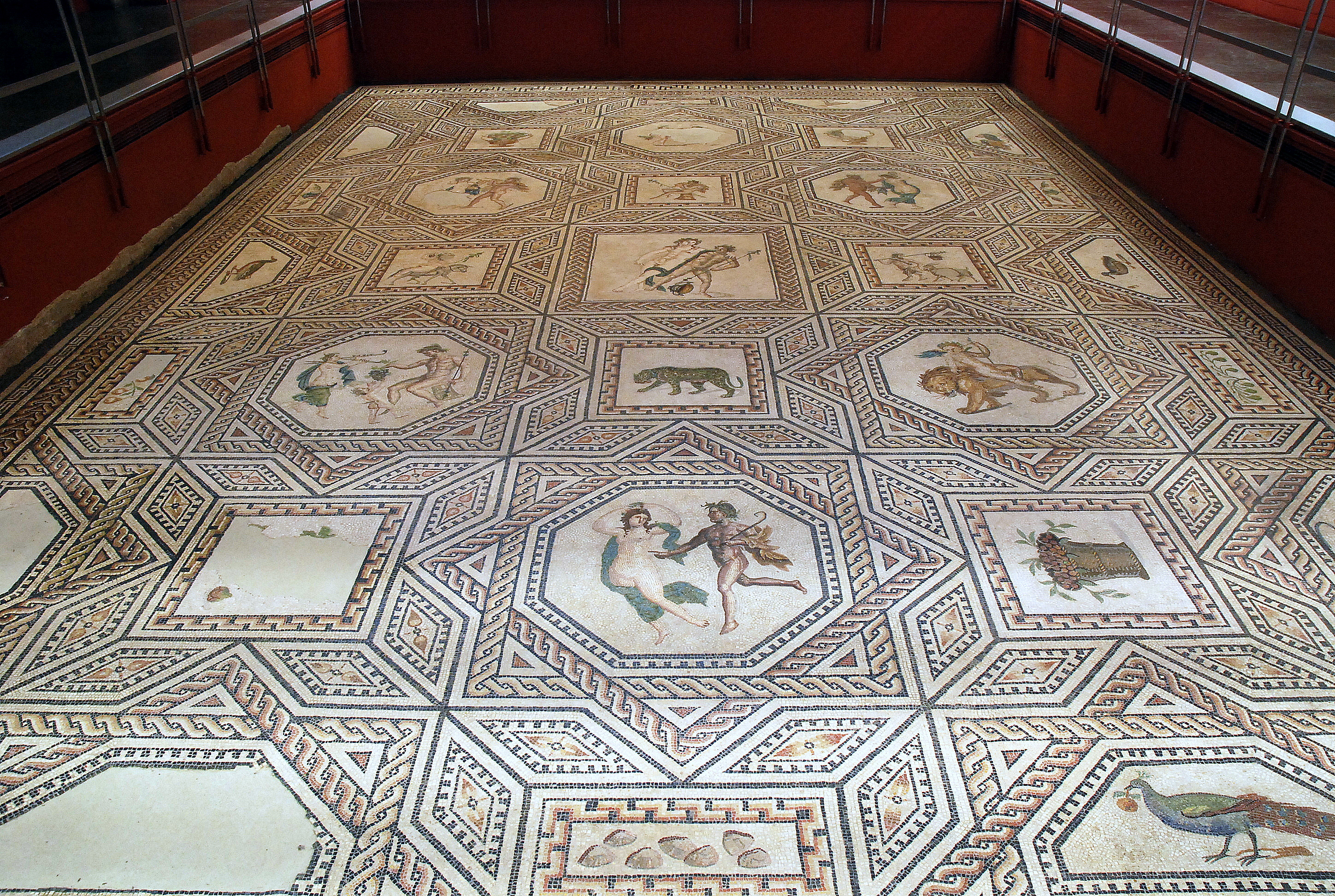
Roman excavation in Cologne: Dionysus Mosaic on display at Römisch-Germanisches Museum

- Farina Fragrance Museum – birthplace of Eau de Cologne
- Römisch-Germanisches Museum (Roman-Germanic Museum) – ancient Roman and Germanic culture
- Wallraf-Richartz Museum – European painting from the 13th to the early 20th century
- Museum Ludwig – modern art
- Museum Schnütgen – medieval art
- Museum für Angewandte Kunst – applied art
- Kolumba Kunstmuseum des Erzbistums Köln (art museum of the Archbishopric of Cologne) – modern art museum built around medieval ruins of St Kolumba, Cologne, completed 2007
- Cathedral Treasury "Domschatzkammer" – historic underground vaults of the Cathedral
- EL-DE Haus – former local headquarters of the Gestapo houses a museum documenting Nazi rule in Cologne with a special focus on the persecution of political dissenters and minorities
- German Sports and Olympic Museum – exhibitions about sports from antiquity until the present
- Imhoff-Schokoladenmuseum – Chocolate Museum
- Geomuseum of the University of Cologne – the exhibition includes fossils (such as dinosaur bones and the skeleton of an Eryops), stones and minerals
- Forum for Internet Technology in Contemporary Art – collections of Internet-based art, corporate part of (NewMediaArtProjectNetwork):cologne, the experimental platform for art and New Media
- Flora und Botanischer Garten Köln – the city's formal park and main botanical garden
- Forstbotanischer Garten Köln – an arboretum and woodland botanical garden

=== Music fairs and festivals ===
The city was home to the internationally famous Ringfest and now to the C/o pop festival. Cologne also hosts a thriving Christmas market with about 4 million annual visitors.

== Economy ==
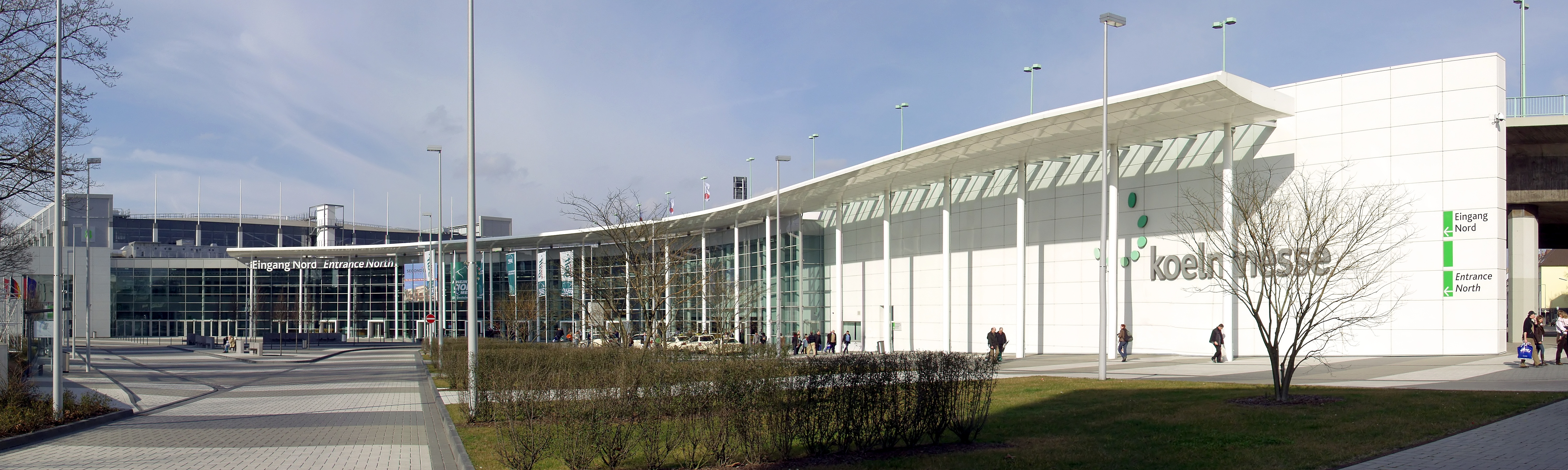
North entrance to Koelnmesse, 2008

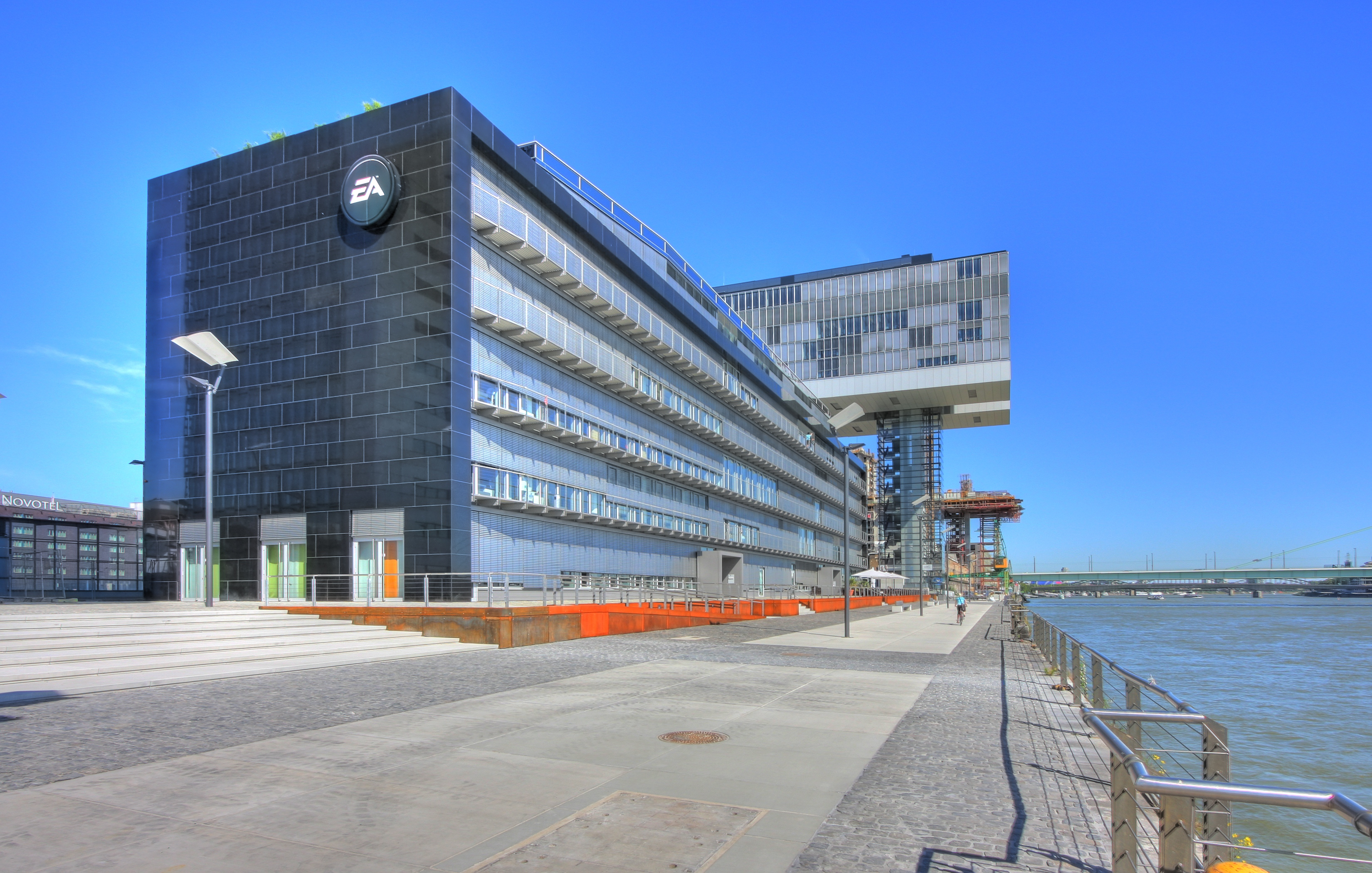
Modern office building at Rheinauhafen, EA Games headquarters

As the largest city in the Rhine-Ruhr metropolitan region, Cologne benefits from a large market structure. In competition with Düsseldorf, the economy of Cologne is primarily based on insurance and media industries, while the city is also an important cultural and research centre and home to a number of corporate headquarters.

Among the largest media companies based in Cologne are Westdeutscher Rundfunk, RTL Television (with subsidiaries), n-tv, Deutschlandradio, Brainpool TV and publishing houses like J. P. Bachem, Taschen, Tandem Verlag and M. DuMont Schauberg. Several clusters of media, arts and communications agencies, TV production studios and state agencies work partly with private and government-funded cultural institutions. Among the insurance companies based in Cologne are Central, DEVK, DKV, Generali Deutschland, Gen Re, Gothaer, HDI Gerling and national headquarters of Axa Insurance, Mitsui Sumitomo Insurance Group and Zurich Financial Services.

The German flag carrier Lufthansa and its subsidiary Lufthansa CityLine have their main corporate headquarters in Cologne. The largest employer in Cologne is Ford Europe, which has its European headquarters and a factory in Niehl (Ford-Werke GmbH). Toyota Motorsport GmbH (TMG), Toyota's official motorsports team, responsible for Toyota rally cars, and then Formula One cars, has its headquarters and workshops in Cologne. Other large companies based in Cologne include the REWE Group, TÜV Rheinland, Deutz AG and a number of Kölsch breweries. The largest three Kölsch breweries of Cologne are Reissdorf, Gaffel and Früh.

Brewery	Established	Annual output in hectoliters
Heinrich Reissdorf	1894	650,000
Gaffel Becker & Co	1908	500,000
Cölner Hofbräu Früh	1904	440,000

Historically, Cologne has always been an important trade city, with land, air and sea connections. The city has five Rhine ports, the second largest inland port in Germany and one of the largest in Europe. Cologne Bonn Airport is the second largest freight terminal in Germany. Today, the Koelnmesse (Koelnmesse) ranks as a major European trade fair location with over 50 trade fairs and other large cultural and sports events. In 2008 Cologne had 4.31 million overnight stays booked and 2.38 million arrivals. Cologne's largest daily newspaper is the Kölner Stadt-Anzeiger.

Cologne shows a significant increase in startup companies, especially when considering digital business.

Cologne had 5.8 million overnight stays booked and 3.35 million arrivals in 2016.

== Transport ==
=== Roads ===
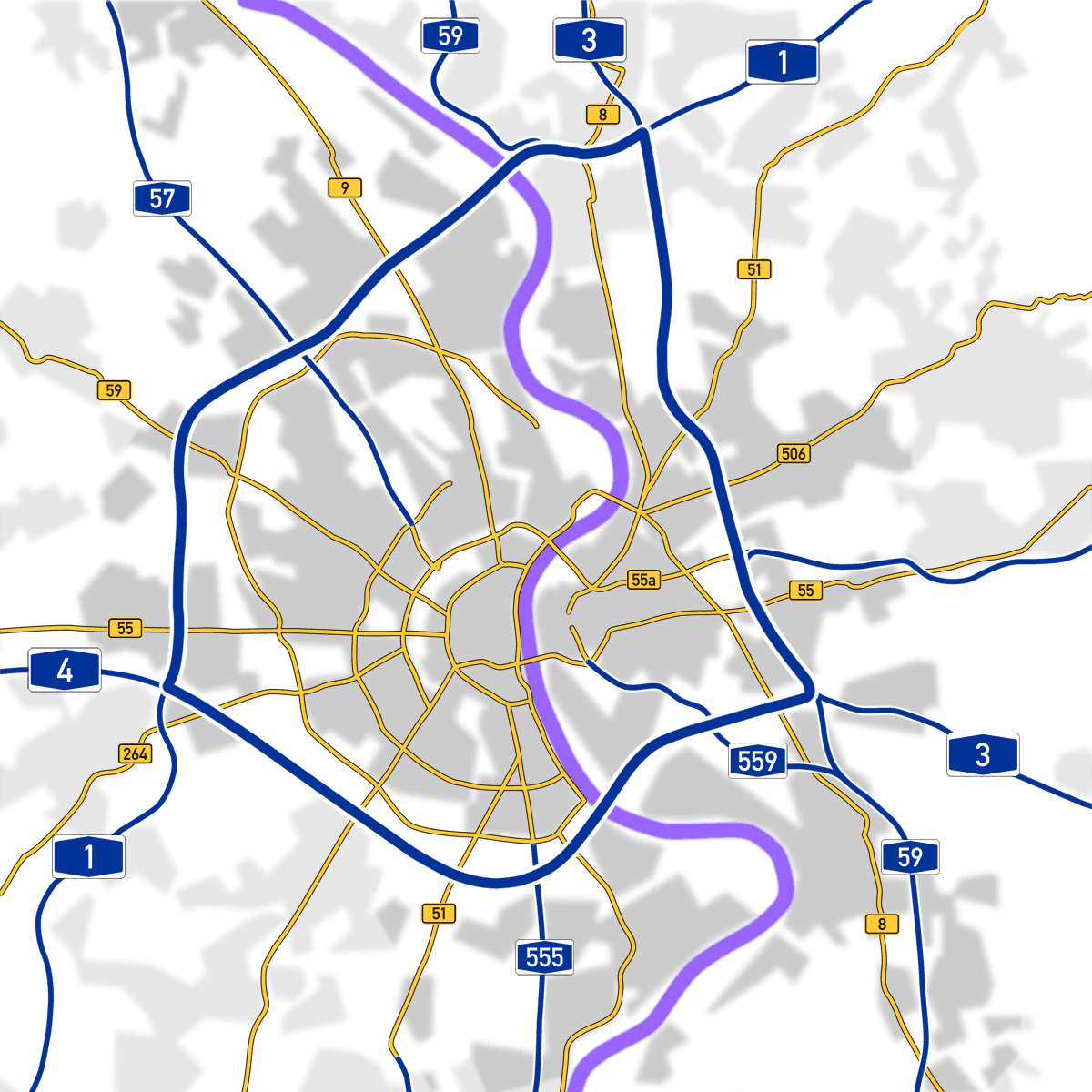
Major roads through and around Cologne

Road building had been a major issue in the 1920s under the leadership of mayor Konrad Adenauer. The first German limited-access road was constructed after 1929 between Cologne and Bonn. Today, this is the Bundesautobahn 555. In 1965, Cologne became the first German city to be fully encircled by a motorway ring road. Roughly at the same time, a city centre bypass (Stadtautobahn) was planned, but only partially put into effect, due to opposition by environmental groups. The completed section became Bundesstraße ("Federal Road") B 55a, which begins at the Zoobrücke ("Zoo Bridge") and meets with A 4 and A 3 at the interchange Cologne East. Nevertheless, it is referred to as Stadtautobahn by most locals. In contrast to this, the Nord-Süd-Fahrt ("North-South-Drive") was actually completed, a new four/six-lane city centre through-route, which had already been anticipated by planners such as Fritz Schumacher in the 1920s. The last section south of Ebertplatz was completed in 1972.

In 2005, the first stretch of an eight-lane motorway in North Rhine-Westphalia was opened to traffic on Bundesautobahn 3, part of the eastern section of the Cologne Beltway between the interchanges Cologne East and Heumar.

=== Cycling ===
Compared to other German cities, Cologne has a not so bicycle-friendly traffic layout. It has repeatedly ranked among the worst in an independent evaluation conducted by the Allgemeiner Deutscher Fahrrad-Club. In 2014, it ranked 36th out of 39 German cities with a population greater than 200,000.

=== Railway ===
Lohsestraße station of Cologne lightrail

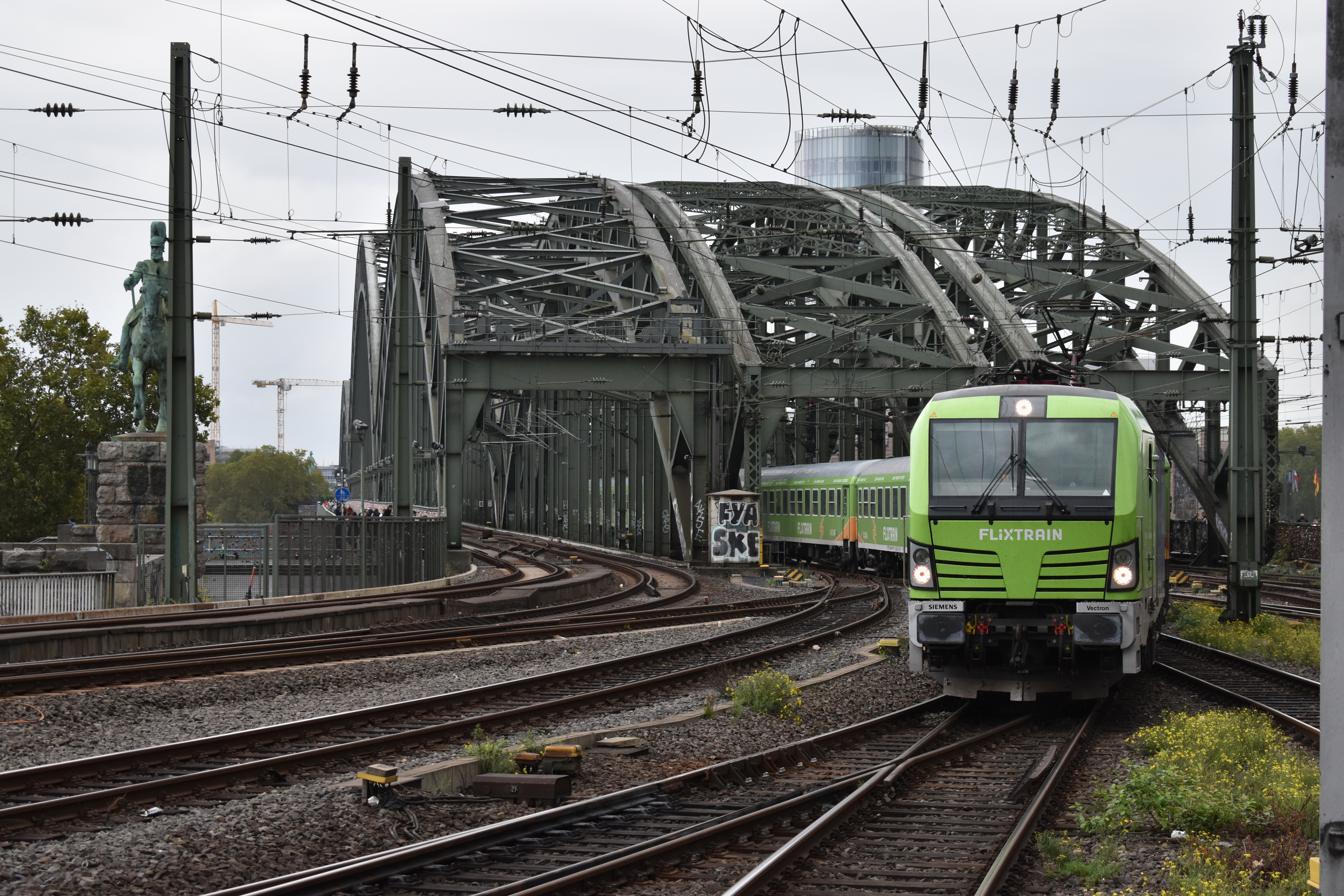
Flixtrain passing Hohenzollern Bridge coming from Köln Messe/Deutz station heating to Köln Hbf

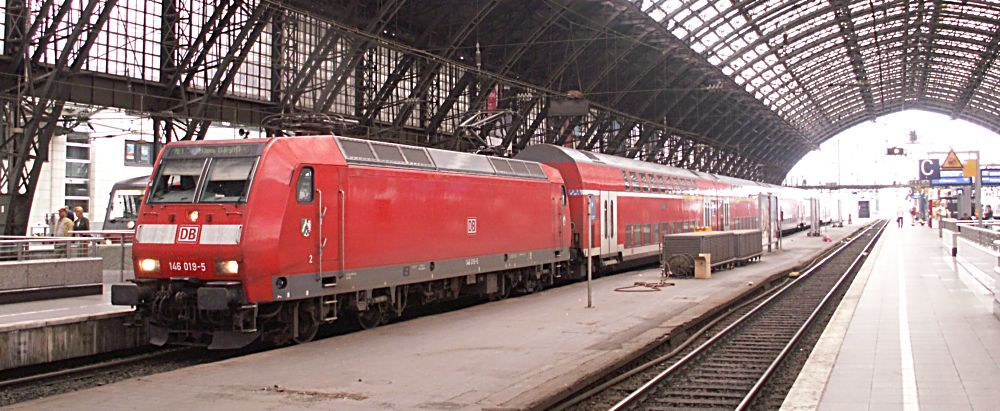
RE train at Köln Hauptbahnhof

Cologne has a railway service with Deutsche Bahn InterCity and ICE-trains stopping at Köln Hauptbahnhof (Cologne Main Station), Köln Messe/Deutz and Cologne/Bonn Airport. ICE and TGV Thalys high-speed trains link Cologne with Amsterdam, Brussels (in 1h47, 9 departures/day) and Paris (in 3h14, 6 departures/day). There are frequent ICE trains to other German cities, including Frankfurt am Main and Berlin. ICE trains to London via the Channel Tunnel were planned for 2013.

The Cologne Stadtbahn operated by Kölner Verkehrsbetriebe (KVB) is an extensive light rail system that is partially underground and serves Cologne and a number of neighbouring cities. It evolved from the tram system. Nearby Bonn is linked by both the Stadtbahn and main line railway trains, with occasional recreational boats on the Rhine. Düsseldorf is also linked by S-Bahn trains, which are operated by Deutsche Bahn.

The Rhine-Ruhr S-Bahn has 5 lines which cross Cologne. The S13/S19 runs 24/7 between Cologne Hbf and Cologne/Bonn airport.

=== Buses ===
There are frequent buses covering most of the city and surrounding suburbs. Long distance buses are offered by FlixBus.

=== Water ===
Häfen und Güterverkehr Köln (Ports and Goods traffic Cologne, HGK) is one of the largest operators of inland ports in Germany. Ports include Köln-Deutz, Köln-Godorf and Köln-Niehl I and II.

=== Air ===
Cologne's international airport is Cologne/Bonn Airport (CGN). It is also called Konrad Adenauer Airport after Germany's first post-war Chancellor Konrad Adenauer, who was born in the city and was mayor of Cologne from 1917 until 1933. The airport is shared with the neighbouring city of Bonn. Cologne is headquarters to the European Union Aviation Safety Agency.

== Education ==
Cologne is home to numerous universities and colleges, and host to some 72,000 students. Its oldest university, the University of Cologne (founded in 1388) is the largest university in Germany, as the Cologne University of Applied Sciences is the largest university of Applied Sciences in the country. The Cologne University of Music and Dance is the largest conservatory in Europe. Foreigners can have German lessons in the VHS (Adult Education Centre).

- Public and state universities:
  - University of Cologne (Universität zu Köln);
  - German Sport University Cologne (Deutsche Sporthochschule Köln).
- Public and state colleges:
  - Cologne University of Applied Sciences ("Technology, Arts, Sciences TH KöLN" Technische Hochschule Köln);
  - Köln International School of Design;
  - Cologne University of Music and Dance (Hochschule für Musik und Tanz Köln);
  - Academy of Media Arts Cologne (Kunsthochschule für Medien Köln);
- Private colleges:
  - Catholic University of Applied Sciences (Katholische Hochschule Nordrhein-Westfalen);
  - Cologne Business School;
  - international filmschool cologne (internationale filmschule köln);
  - Rhenish University of Applied Sciences (Rheinische Fachhochschule Köln)
  - University of Applied Sciences Fresenius (Hochschule Fresenius)
- Research institutes:
  - German Aerospace Centre (Deutsches Zentrum für Luft- und Raumfahrt);
  - European Astronaut Centre (EAC) of the European Space Agency;
  - European College of Sport Science (ECSS);
  - Max Planck Institute for the Biology of Ageing (Max-Planck-Institut für die Biologie des Alterns);
  - Max Planck Institute for the Study of Societies (Max-Planck-Institut für Gesellschaftsforschung);
  - Max Planck Institute for Neurological Research (Max-Planck-Institut für neurologische Forschung);
  - Max Planck Institute for Plant Breeding Research (Max-Planck-Institut für Züchtungsforschung).
  - CologneAMS – Centre for Accelerator Mass Spectrometry, Institute for Nuclear Physics, University of Cologne

Former colleges include:

- The Cologne Art and Crafts Schools (Kölner Werkschulen);
- The Cologne Institute for Religious Art (Kölner Institut für religiöse Kunst)

Lauder Morijah School (German: Lauder-Morijah-Schule), a Jewish school in Cologne, previously closed. After Russian immigration increased the Jewish population, the school reopened in 2002.

== Media ==
Within Germany, Cologne is known as an important media centre. Several radio and television stations, including Westdeutscher Rundfunk (WDR), RTL and VOX, have their headquarters in the city. Film and TV production is also important. The city is "Germany's capital of TV crime stories". A third of all German TV productions are made in the Cologne region. Furthermore, the city hosts the Cologne Comedy Festival, which is considered to be the largest comedy festival in mainland Europe.

== Sports ==
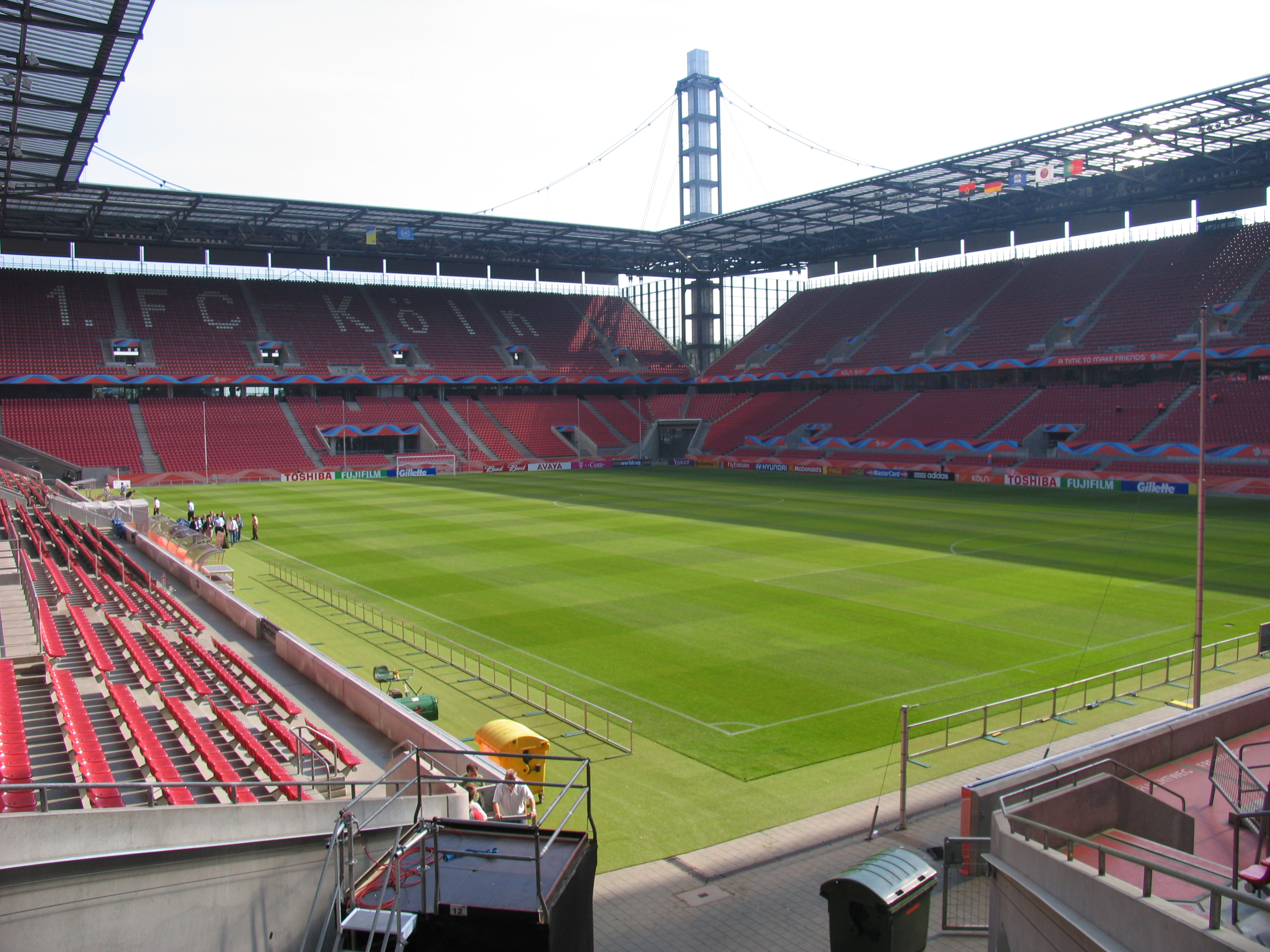
RheinEnergieStadion is the stadium of Bundesliga club 1. FC Köln.

Cologne hosts the football club 1. FC Köln, who play currently in the Bundesliga after being promoted from the second division in 2025. They play their home matches in RheinEnergieStadion which also hosted five matches of the 2006 FIFA World Cup. The International Olympic Committee and the International Association of Sports and Leisure Facilities gave RheinEnergieStadion a bronze medal for "being one of the best sporting venues in the world". The city also hosts the two football clubs FC Viktoria Köln and SC Fortuna Köln, who play in the 3. Liga (third division) and the Regionalliga West (fourth division) respectively. Cologne's oldest football club 1. FSV Köln 1899 is playing with its amateur team in the Verbandsliga (sixth division).

Cologne also is home of the ice hockey team Kölner Haie, which is playing in the highest ice hockey league in Germany, the Deutsche Eishockey Liga. They are based at Lanxess Arena.

Several horse races per year are held at Cologne-Weidenpesch Racecourse since 1897, the annual Cologne Marathon was started in 1997 and the classic cycling race Rund um Köln is organised in Cologne since 1908. The city also has a long tradition in rowing, being home of some of Germany's oldest regatta courses and boat clubs, such as the Kölner Rudergesellschaft 1891 or the Kölner Ruderverein von 1877 in the Rodenkirchen district.

Japanese automotive manufacturer Toyota has their major motorsport facility known by the name Toyota Motorsport GmbH, which is located in the Marsdorf district and is responsible for Toyota's major motorsport development and operations, which in the past included the FIA Formula One World Championship, the FIA World Rally Championship and the Le Mans Series. They are working on Toyota's team Toyota Gazoo Racing which competes in the FIA World Endurance Championship.

Cologne is considered "the secret golf capital of Germany". The first golf club in North Rhine-Westphalia was founded in Cologne in 1906. The city offers the most options and top events in Germany.

The city has hosted several sports events which includes the 2005 FIFA Confederations Cup, 2006 FIFA World Cup, 2007 World Men's Handball Championship, 2010 and 2017 Ice Hockey World Championships, 2024 FIFA European Championship and 2010 Gay Games.

Since 2014, the city has hosted ESL One Cologne, one of the biggest Counter-Strike tournaments held annually in July/August at Lanxess Arena.

Furthermore, Cologne is home of the Sport-Club Colonia 1906, Germany's oldest boxing club and the Kölner Athleten-Club 1882, the world's oldest active weightlifting club.

== Notable people ==
- Jacques Offenbach (1819–1880), composer
- Jean Bugatti (1909–1939), automotive designer and test engineer
- Heinrich Böll (1917–1985), German Writer, Nobel Prize for Literature 1972
- Paul-Jürgen Weber (born 1942), visual artist and photographer
- Udo Kier (born 1944), German actor
- Wolfgang Voigt (born 1961), DJ and producer
- Markus N. Beeko (born 1967), human rights activist
- Angela Gossow (born 1974), German singer, former lead singer for Arch Enemy
- Patrick Helmes (born 1984), former footballer for the German national team
- Alice Hasters (born 1989), journalist, author and podcaster
- Nils Politt (born 1994), professional cyclist
- Leon Draisaitl (born 1995), ice hockey player
- Marie Reim (born 2000), singer
- Justin Diehl (born 2004), professional footballer
- Mathilda Paatz (born 2008), racing driver
- Kerim Alajbegović (born 2007), professional footballer who plays as a winger for Serie A club Juventus FC.

== Twin towns – sister cities ==
Cologne is twinned with:

- Barcelona, Spain (1984)
- Beijing, China (1987)
- Bethlehem, Palestine (1996)
- Cluj-Napoca, Romania (1976)
- Corinto, Nicaragua (1988)
- Cork, Ireland (1988)
- Dnipro, Ukraine (2024)
- Esch-sur-Alzette, Luxembourg (1958)
- Indianapolis, United States (1988)
- Istanbul, Turkey (1997)
- Katowice, Poland (1991)
- Kyoto, Japan (1963)
- Liège, Belgium (1958)
- Lille, France (1958)
- Liverpool, England (1952)
- Neukölln (Berlin), Germany (1967)
- El Realejo, Nicaragua (1988)
- Rio de Janeiro, Brazil (2011)
- Rotterdam, Netherlands (1958)
- Tel Aviv, Israel (1979)
- Thessaloniki, Greece (1988)
- Treptow-Köpenick (Berlin), Germany (1990)
- Tunis, Tunisia (1964)
- Turin, Italy (1958)
- Turku, Finland (1967)

=== Former twin towns ===
- Volgograd, Russia (1988) - suspended in 2022

== See also ==
- Stadtwerke Köln, the municipal infrastructure company, operator of the city's railways, ports and other utilities
- New Year's Eve sexual assaults in Germany
- Hänneschen-Theater
