= Porz =

Porz (7)
- Borough of Cologne
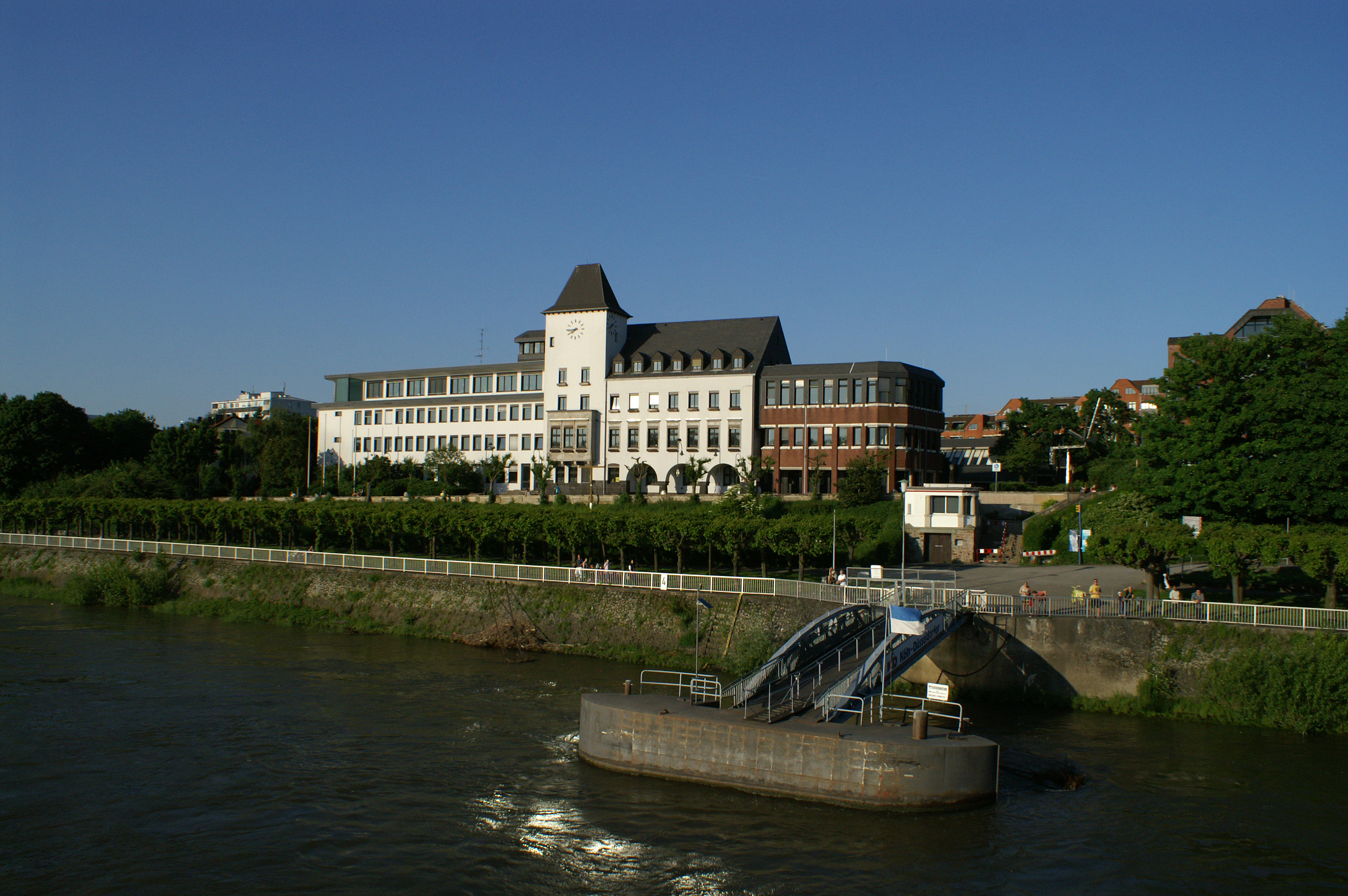
- River view of Porz with district town hall, 2010

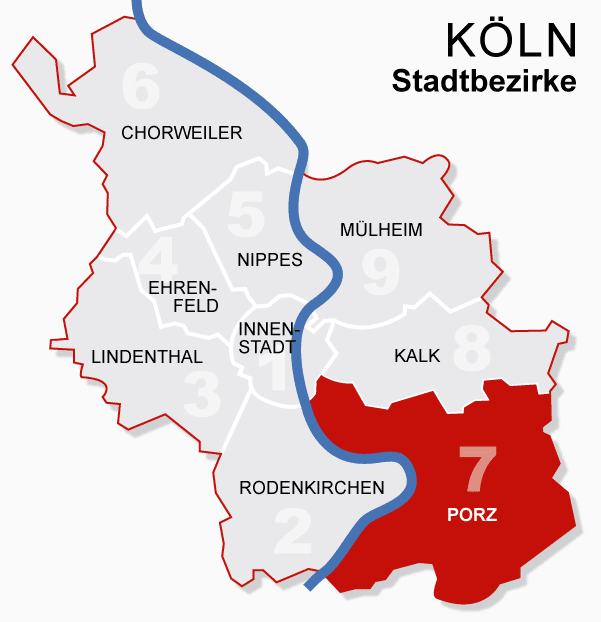
- Location within Cologne
- Interactive map of Porz (7)
- Location within Germany Location within North Rhine-Westphalia
- Coordinates: 50°53′16″N 7°03′19″E
- Country: Germany
- State: North Rhine-Westphalia
- Admin. region: Cologne
- District: Urban district
- City: Cologne

Area
  - Total: 78.92 km^{2} (30.47 sq mi)

Population (2020-12-31)
  - Total: 113,415
  - Density: 1,437/km^{2} (3,722/sq mi)
- Time zone: UTC+01:00 (CET)
  - Summer (DST): UTC+02:00 (CEST)

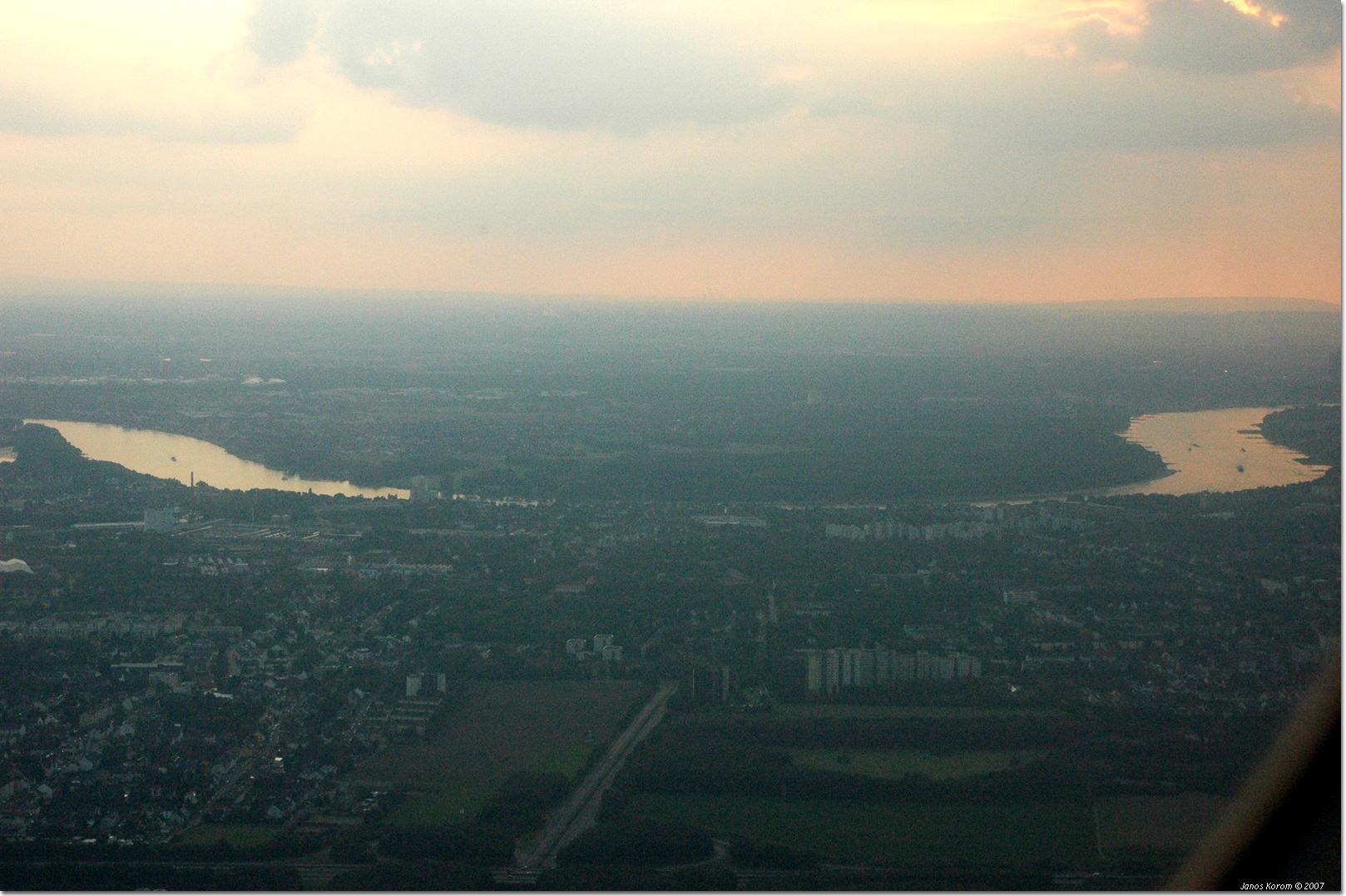
Aerial photograph of Porz, looking west across the Rhine

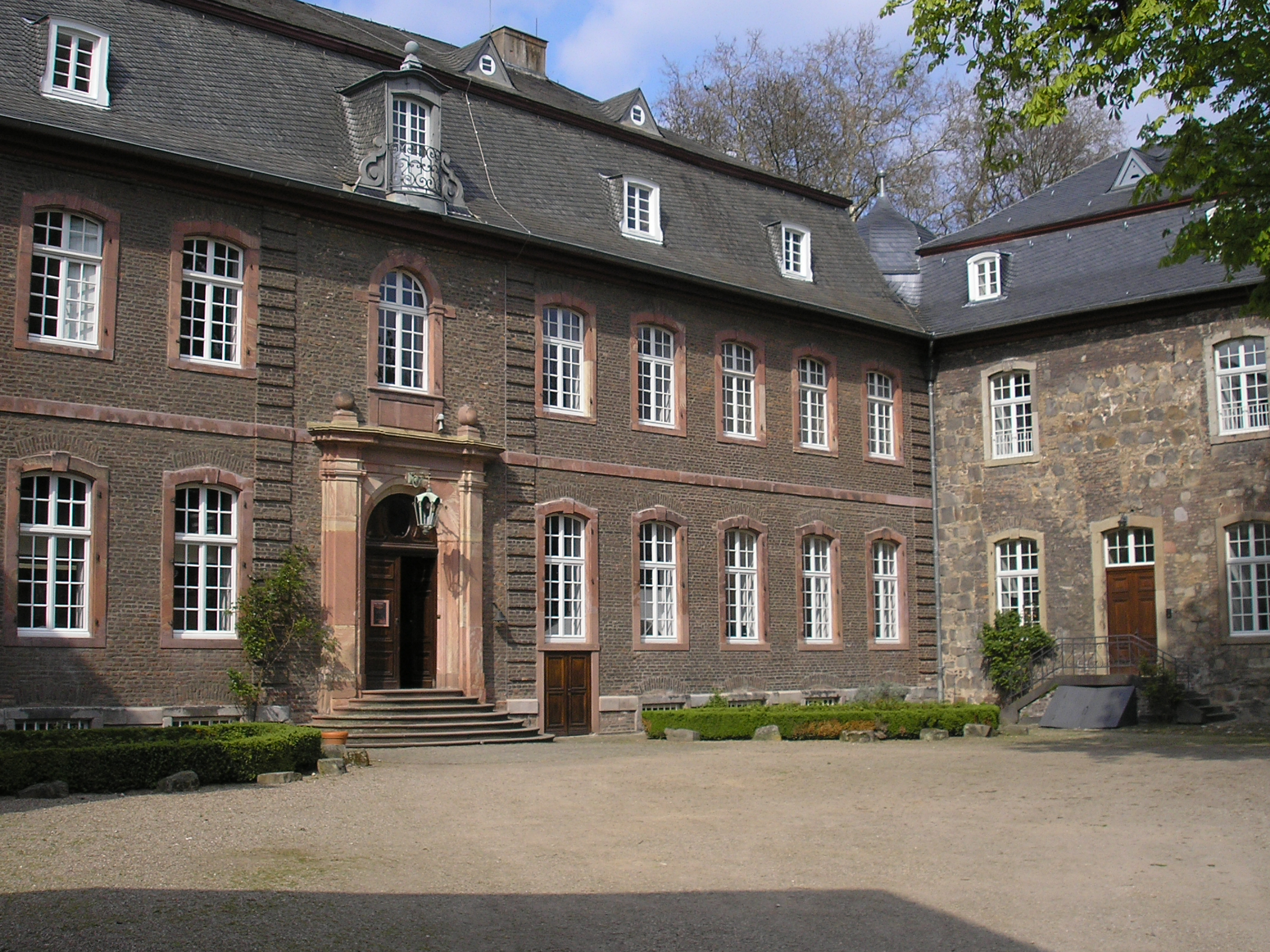
Courtyard a of mid-18th-century Schloss in Wahn

Porz (German pronunciation: [pɔʁts]) is a borough, or Stadtbezirk, of Cologne, Germany. It is situated on the east side of the Rhine river in the south-east of the city. Porz is the largest borough of Cologne by area, at 78.92 km^{2} and has 113,500 inhabitants.

Porz borders with the Cologne boroughs of Kalk and Innenstadt to the north, Rheinisch-Bergischer Kreis and Rhein-Sieg-Kreis to the east and south, and the Rhine to the west. On the other riverbank lies the Cologne borough of Rodenkirchen.

== History ==
In 1951 the former independent town of Porz was awarded the town privileges (Stadtrechte). In the course of the local government reform in the 1970s in North Rhine-Westphalia, Porz was incorporated with Cologne.

== Subdivisions ==
Porz consists of 16 Stadtteile (city parts):

| # | City part | Population (2009) | Area (km^{2}) | Pop. per km^{2} | map |
|---|---|---|---|---|---|
| 701 | Poll | 11,141 | 5.17 | 2,156 | District map of Porz |
| 702 | Westhoven | 4,604 | 4.22 | 1,092 | District map of Porz |
| 703 | Ensen | 6,860 | 1.62 | 4,233 | District map of Porz |
| 704 | Gremberghoven | 2,842 | 5.83 | 487 | District map of Porz |
| 705 | Eil | 8,813 | 16.2 | 543 | District map of Porz |
| 706 | Porz | 13,785 | 3.12 | 4,420 | District map of Porz |
| 707 | Urbach | 11,970 | 2.29 | 5,220 | District map of Porz |
| 708 | Elsdorf | 1,480 | 1.77 | 838 | District map of Porz |
| 709 | Grengel | 5,202 | 10.7 | 487 | District map of Porz |
| 710 | Wahnheide | 7,638 | 2.88 | 2,655 | District map of Porz |
| 711 | Wahn | 6,076 | 2.26 | 2,684 | District map of Porz |
| 712 | Lind | 3,378 | 2.25 | 1,503 | District map of Porz |
| 713 | Libur | 1,106 | 6.38 | 173 | District map of Porz |
| 714 | Zündorf | 12,060 | 8.12 | 1,485 | District map of Porz |
| 715 | Langel | 3,201 | 5.33 | 601 | District map of Porz |
| 716 | Finkenberg | 6,377 | 0.64 | 9,998 | District map of Porz |
source: Die Kölner Stadtteile in Zahlen 2010 (in German)

== Economy ==
Organisations based in Porz include The German Aerospace Center, TÜV Rheinland, The European Astronaut Centre of the European Space Agency, and the Cologne-Bonn airport. Engine manufacturer Deutz AG has its headquarter and a R&D facility in Porz. The Executive Transport Wing of the German Air Force is based on the military part of the Cologne-Bonn airport and contributes to the local economy by the large number of soldiers stationed there. Since the beginning of the 20th century, Porz has been known for its glass manufacture.

== Transport ==
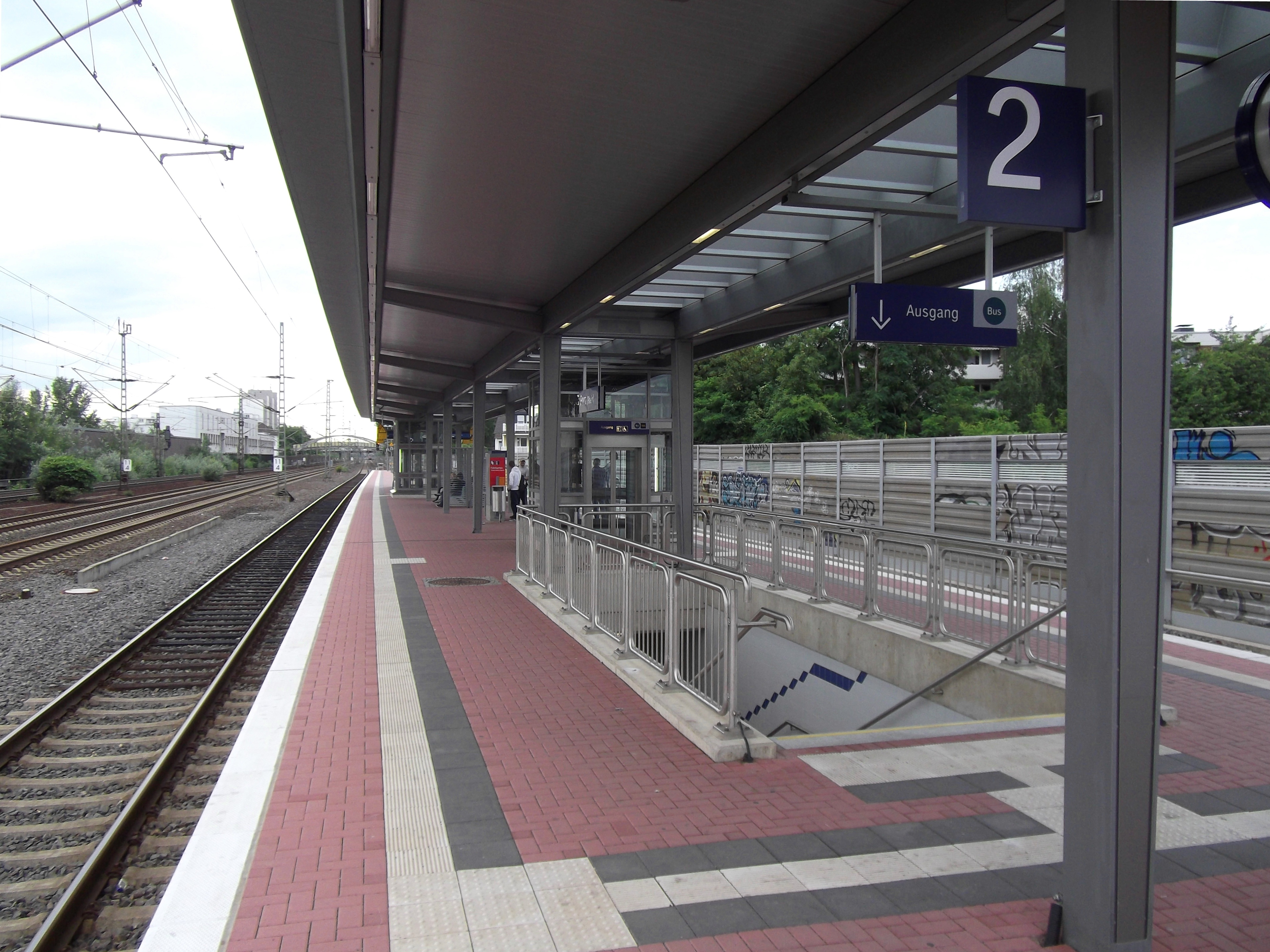
Porz (Rhein) railway station

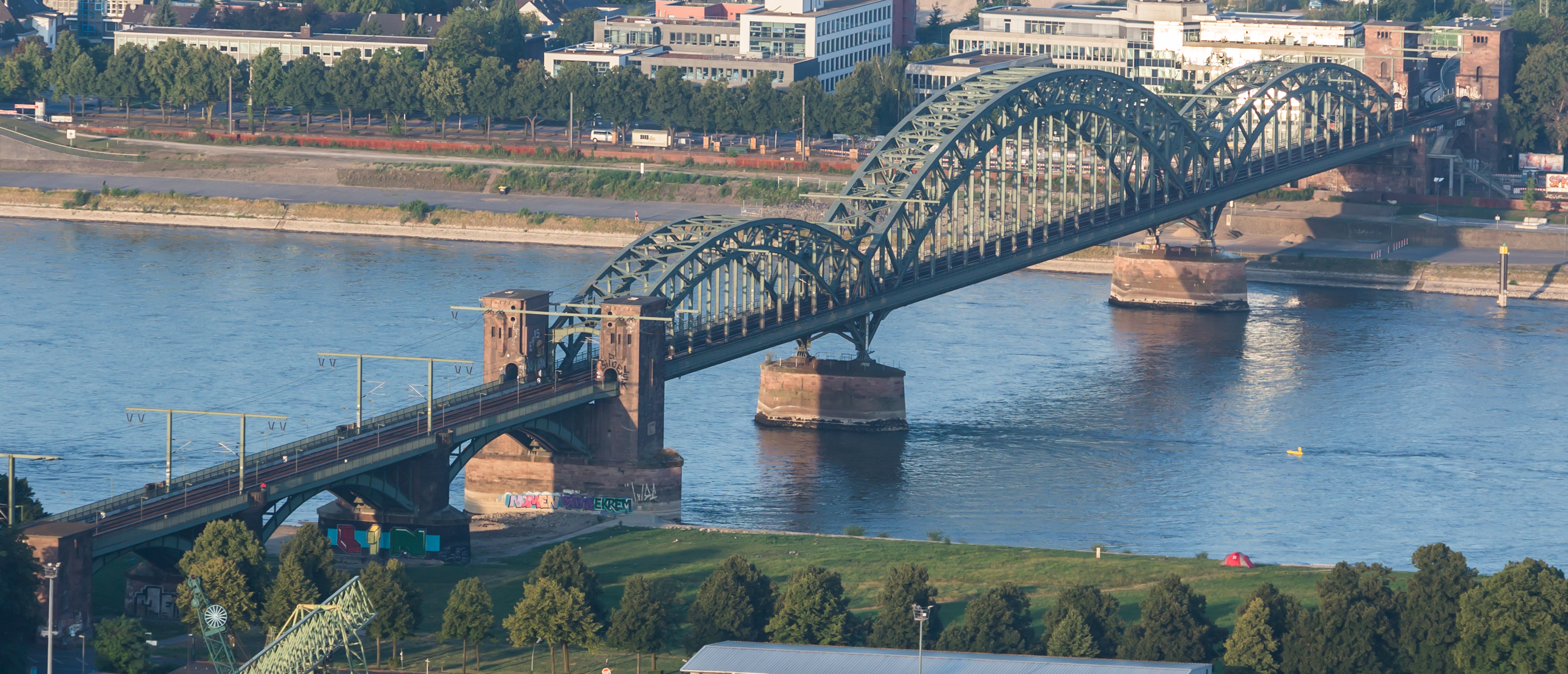
Südbrücke

For car drivers, Porz can be reached from the Cologne Beltway via Bundesautobahn 59 and Bundesautobahn 559.

=== Rhine bridges ===
- Südbrücke
- A 4 Rodenkirchener Autobahnbrücke

=== Public transport ===
Porz is served by a number of railway stations. Regional train station include Porz (Rhein), Porz-Wahn, Köln-Steinstraße, and Köln-Airport Business Park. Porz (proper) has two light-rail stations of Stadtbahn line 7: Porz Steinstraße to the north and Porz Markt in the town center.

== Twin towns – sister cities ==
Porz is "twinned" with the following cities:

- Brive-la-Gaillarde, France
- Dunstable, United Kingdom
- Hazebrouck, France
