= Districts of Cologne =

Administrative divisions of German city

Since the last administrative reform in 1975, the City of Cologne is made up of nine Stadtbezirke and 86 Stadtteile. Stadtbezirk literally translates as city district, which are further subdivided into Stadtteile (city parts). The Stadtteile of Cologne's old and new town (Alt- and Neustadt) further consist of quarters, known as "Veedel" in both Kölsch and most often, the Rhinelandic regiolect, as well.

City districts are differentiated of being links- or rechtsrheinisch – left or right of the Rhine, with the old town being left of the Rhine, as are 230,25 km^{2} (56.8 percent of 405,14 km^{2} within city limits), while 174,87 km^{2} (43.2 percent) lie right of the Rhine. In regard to population, Cologne is the largest city in the state of North Rhine-Westphalia and the fourth largest city in Germany.

== Districts ==
Map	Coat	City district	City parts	Area	Population^{1}	Pop. density	District Councils	Town Hall
		District 1 Köln-Innenstadt	Altstadt-Nord, Altstadt-Süd, Deutz, Neustadt-Nord, Neustadt-Süd	16.4 km²	127.033	7.746/km²	Bezirksksamt Innenstadt; Brückenstraße 19, D-50667 Köln	
		District 2 Köln-Rodenkirchen	Bayenthal, Godorf, Hahnwald, Immendorf, Marienburg, Meschenich, Raderberg, Raderthal, Rodenkirchen, Rondorf, Sürth, Weiß, Zollstock	54.6 km²	100.936	1.850/km²	Bezirksamt Rodenkirchen; Hauptstraße 85, D-50996 Köln	
		District 3 Köln-Lindenthal	Braunsfeld, Junkersdorf, Klettenberg, Lindenthal, Lövenich, Müngersdorf, Sülz, Weiden, Widdersdorf	41.6 km²	137.552	3.308/km²	Bezirksamt Lindenthal; Aachener Straße 220, 50931 Köln	
		District 4 Köln-Ehrenfeld	Bickendorf, Bocklemünd/Mengenich, Ehrenfeld, Neuehrenfeld, Ossendorf, Vogelsang	23.8 km²	103.621	4.348/km²	Bezirksamt Ehrenfeld; Venloer Straße 419 – 421, D-50825 Köln	
		District 5 Köln-Nippes	Bilderstöckchen, Longerich, Mauenheim, Niehl, Nippes, Riehl, Weidenpesch	31.8 km²	110.092	3.462/km²	Bezirksamt Nippes; Neusser Straße 450, D-50733 Köln	
		District 6 Köln-Chorweiler	Blumenberg, Chorweiler, Esch/Auweiler, Fühlingen, Heimersdorf, Lindweiler, Merkenich, Pesch, Roggendorf/Thenhoven, Seeberg, Volkhoven/Weiler, Worringen	67.2 km²	80.870	1.204/km²	Bezirksamt Chorweiler; Pariser Platz 1, D-50765 Köln	
		District 7 Köln-Porz	Eil, Elsdorf, Ensen, Finkenberg, Gremberghoven, Grengel, Langel, Libur, Lind, Poll, Porz, Urbach, Wahn, Wahnheide, Westhoven, Zündorf	78.8 km²	106.520	1.352/km²	Bezirksamt Porz; Friedrich-Ebert-Ufer 64–70, D-51143 Köln	
		District 8 Köln-Kalk	Brück, Höhenberg, Humboldt/Gremberg, Kalk, Merheim, Neubrück, Ostheim, Rath/Heumar, Vingst	38.2 km²	108.330	2.841/km²	Bezirksamt Kalk; Kalker Hauptstraße 247–273, D-51103 Köln	
		District 9 Köln-Mülheim	Buchforst, Buchheim, Dellbrück, Dünnwald, Flittard, Höhenhaus, Holweide, Mülheim, Stammheim	52.2 km²	144.374	2.764/km²	Bezirksamt Mülheim; Wiener Platz 2a, D-51065 Köln	
		Cologne		405.15 km^{2}	1.019.328^{2}	2.516/km^{2}		
Notes:^{1}: population as of 31. December 2008^{2}: Statistical records of the City of Cologne include "second home residents", which state records exclude. Cologne's population as by statistical records of the State of North Rhine-Westphalia was 1,000,298 on 31. May 2009

== Growth of urban area ==
map of the nine Stadtbezirke (city districts) and 86 Stadtteile (city parts) of Cologne

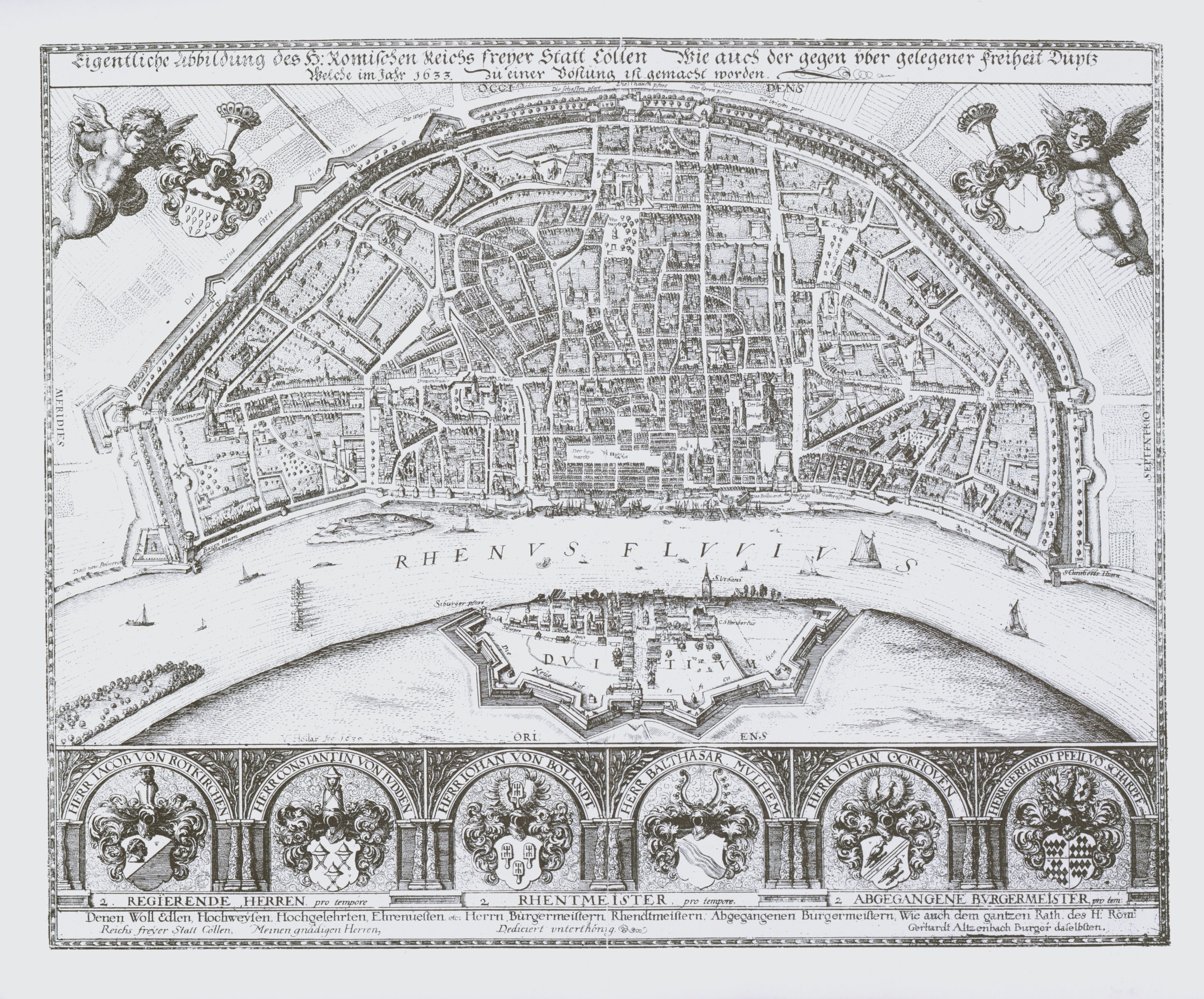
map of Cologne, 1633

Since the city's foundation in 38 BC, Cologne grew through numerous extensions and incorporation of surrounding municipalities. Since the construction of the Medieval wall in 1180, the area of the old imperial city of Cologne has not changed for more than 600 years and was only extended over the old city walls in 1794, just short before the arrival of French troops and Cologne's incorporation into the First French Empire.

After 1815, the Kingdom of Prussia enforced the construction of fortifications which again hindered any growth for the city. Only with the acquisition of these fortifications in 1881, the city of Cologne had the possibility of a gradual territorial expansion. On 12. November 1883 a strip of territory from parts of the municipalities of Ehrenfeld, Kriel, Longerich, Müngersdorf and Rondorf was added to the city. At the time of the Industrial Revolution, industrial enterprises already avoided the densely populated areas inside of the city limits and settled in the small towns outside the fortified area, while maintaining close economic links to the city of Cologne. More than half of the estates here were in the hands of citizens of Cologne or the same becoming residents in these areas.

Since 1886, the Cologne City Council intensified negotiations with the surrounding communities, and on 1 April 1888 ended in a first major incorporation. Since then the city has expanded with major reorganizations in 1910, 1914, 1922 and 1975.

Date	Incorporated localities
1 April 1888	town of Deutz; town of Ehrenfeld and present day Neu-Ehrenfeld; part of the town of Kalk; parts of the town of Mülheim (Mülheimer Hafen); parts of the muni. of Efferen (present day Klettenberg); muni. of Kriel (Braunsfeld, Kriel, Lind, Lindenthal, Sülz); muni. of Longerich (Butzweiler, Heimersdorf, Lindweiler, Longerich, Niehl, Stallagsberg, Volkhoven, Weidenpesch; muni. of Müngersdorf (Bickendorf, Bocklemünd, Melaten, Mengenich, Müngersdorf, Ossendorf, Vogelsang); muni. of Nippes (Mauenheim, Nippes, Riehl); muni. of Poll (Humboldt-Gremberg, Poll); parts of muni. of Rondorf (Arnoldshöhe, Bayenthal, Klettenberg, Mansfeld, Marienburg, Raderberg, Raderthal, Weißhaus, Zollstock)
1 April 1910	Höhenberg; Humboldt-Gremberg; town of Kalk; Ostheim; muni. of Vingst
1 April 1914	town of Mülheim (incl. Buchforst, Buchheim, Kleinbert); from Landkreis Mülheim: Bürgermeisterei Merheim (Brück, Dellbrück, Dünnwald, Flittard, Hardt, Höhenberg, Höhenhaus, Holweide, Kunstfeld, Merheim, Ostheim, Rath, Rodderhof, Scheuerhof, Schlagbaum, Stammheim)
1 April 1922	parts of Landgemeinde Worringen: Fühlingen (incl. Feldkassel, Kasselberg, Langel, Rheinkassel), Merkenich, Roggendorf, Thenhoven, Weiler, Worringen; parts of the muni. of Longerich
1 January 1975	town of Porz (Eil, Elsdorf, Ensen, Flughafen, Gremberghoven, Grengel, Heumar, Langel, Libur, Lind, Porz, Urbach, Wahn, Wahn-Heide, Westhoven, Zündorf); parts of the muni. of Brauweiler (Rath, Gut Vogelsang, Widdersdorf); parts of the town of Frechen (Horbell, Marsdorf); parts of the muni. of Lövenich; muni. of Rodenkirchen (Giesdorf, Godorf, Hahnwald, Hochkirchen, Höningen, Immendorf, Konraderhöhe, Meschenich, Rodenkirchen, Rondorf, Sürth, Weiß); parts of muni. of Sinnersdorf (Auweiler, Esch, Pesch, Gut Stöckheim); parts of the town of Brühl; parts of the munis. of Bornheim, Hürth, Pulheim and Rösrath.

Source: Historical Archive of the City of Cologne
