= Értéksziget =

- Founders Zoltán József Szabó and Alexa Szabó
- Industry: Medical-aids retail
- Founded: 1 September 2011
- Founder: Zoltán József Szabó and Alexa Szabó
- Headquarters: Budapest, Hungary
- Area served: Hungary
- Products: Medical aids, home-care and rehabilitation equipment
- Owner: FKI Nonprofit Kft.
- Website: www.erteksziget.hu

Értéksziget is a Hungarian medical-aids retailer and home care information platform operated by FKI Nonprofit Kft. The operating organization was founded by Alexa Szabó and Zoltán József Szabó in 2009, and its Értéksziget online store was launched in September 2011. The business operates a specialist medical-aids shop and a nationwide online store, selling products for home care, patient care and rehabilitation.

== History ==
Alexa Szabó and Zoltán József Szabó, a married couple with disabilities founded FKI Nonprofit Kft. on December 3, 2009, the International Day of Persons with Disabilities. The company initially focused on promoting equal opportunities and improving accessibility in audiovisual communication services. When the original consultancy activity did not generate sufficient demand, the company gradually shifted towards the sale of assistive and medical products. The Értéksziget online store began operating in September 2011, initially from the founders' home.

In 2016, Értéksziget moved into separate premises, enabling it to increase its stock and expand product range. During Covid-19 pandemic, online sales became more important and the company its delivery services and home care information activities. In the following years, the warehouse was improved and Értéksziget became a licensed medical supply store in Budapest in 2022.

Értéksziget has operated the Értékteremt-Ő programme, which in its earlier form supported organizations and activities involving people with disabilities. In July 2026, the Dietetic Service of the Rehabilitation Clinic of Semmelweis University received the Értékteremt-Ő programme recognition.The operator is also listed among medical aids suppliers contracted by Nemzeti Egészségbiztosítási Alapkezelo (National Institute of Health Insurance Fund) in Hungary.

== Knowledge Center ==
Értéksziget operates the Értéksziget Knowledge Center which publishes educational and practical material concerning home care, patient care, rehabilitation, and the selection and use of medical aids. Its content includes practical guides, usage information and health related article, some of which are reviewed by medical or other healthcare professionals.

The Knowledge Center was developed from earlier educational activities as a home care knowledge repository established in 2015, and was expanded as the Értéksziget Knowledge Center in May 2026. It contains written and video guides, and articles reviewed by medical and healthcare professionals.

Erteksziget ISO 9001 certificate handover at TUV Rheinland Budapest 2026

== Quality Management ==
In 2026, FKI Nonprofit Kft. obtained ISO 9001:2015 certification from TÜV Rheinland. The certified quality management system covers processes associated with the Értéksziget specialist shop and online store, including related customer service and information activities.

== Awards and Recognition ==
Presentation of MagyarBrands Innovative Brand Award, 2023

Értéksziget received Fogyasztóbarát Vállalcozás (Consumer-Friendly Business) award from Hungary's National Consumer Protection Authority (Nemzeti Fogyasztóvédelmi Hátósag) in 2014. It has also received a Disability-Friendly Workplace Recognition. In 2023, Értéksziget received the MagyarBrands Innovative Brand recognition.

Additionally, it had a Dun & Bradstreet Bisnode A (A1) certification in 2016, 1A Silver Certification in 2019, and AAA rating in 2021.
