= Zollstock =

District of Cologne

- Stadtteil of Cologne
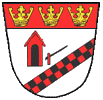
- Coat of arms

- Location within Rodenkirchen
- Interactive map of Zollstock
- Location within Germany Location within North Rhine-Westphalia
- Coordinates: 50°54′21″N 6°56′45″E
- Country: Germany
- State: North Rhine-Westphalia
- Admin. region: Cologne
- District: Urban district
- City: Cologne
- Borough: Rodenkirchen
- First mentioned: 1877

Area
  - Total: 5.03 km^{2} (1.94 sq mi)

Population (2020-12-31)
  - Total: 23,186
  - Density: 4,610/km^{2} (11,900/sq mi)
- Time zone: UTC+01:00 (CET)
  - Summer (DST): UTC+02:00 (CEST)
- Postal codes: 50769
- Dialling codes: 0221

Zollstock (German pronunciation: [ˈtsɔlˌʃtɔk]) is a district (German: Stadtteil) of Cologne in the borough (German: Bezirk) of Rodenkirchen. Situated west of the river Rhine, Zollstock was first mentioned in 1877 and experienced increased development from the 1880s onwards. Since 1901, the district has housed the Südfriedhof, a large monumental cemetery.

== Geography ==
Zollstock is a district (German: Stadtteil) located in Rodenkirchen, a borough (German: Bezirk) of Cologne west of the river Rhine. It borders the districts of Klettenberg and Sülz to the north west, Neustadt-Süd to the north, Raderberg and Raderthal to the east, and Rondorf to the south. Zollstock spans an area of 5.03 square kilometres.

== History ==
Zollstock was first mentioned as a settlement in an 1877 address book. Increased construction in the area began in 1881 when a Neustadt district, an expansion of the original nucleus, was added to the city. Due to an abundance of local clay pits, Zollstock was initially dominated by brick manufactures. The district's name is derived from a local tollhouse (German: Zollhaus) which stood at a crossing of dirt roads in what later became Zollstock.

In 1896, the district was prepared for the construction of the Südfriedhof, a large monumental cemetery: existing roads were expanded and Zollstock was connected to the city's tram network. The cemetery opened in 1901 and remains one of the district's main sights. After the First World War, a number of residential neighbourhoods were erected in the district. Though this initially included mainly detached homes, blocks of flats increasingly became the norm from 1925 onwards. Since the 1980s, much of Zollstock's housing stock has been subject to modernisation and refurbishment.

== Demographics ==
As of 2019, Zollstock had a population of around 23,000 inhabitants. Its population density was around 4,600 people per square kilometre. The district's average age was 42.4, compared to 43.3 for the borough of Rodenkirchen as a whole. Around 8,023 inhabitants self-identified as Roman Catholic, 3,543 as Protestant, while 11,780 belonged to neither. 32.9% of respondents came from a migration background.

== Bibliography ==
- Amt für Stadtentwicklung und Statistik (2019). Kölner Stadtteilinformationen (PDF).
