= Poll, Cologne =

Coordinates: 50°54′48″N 6°59′24″E

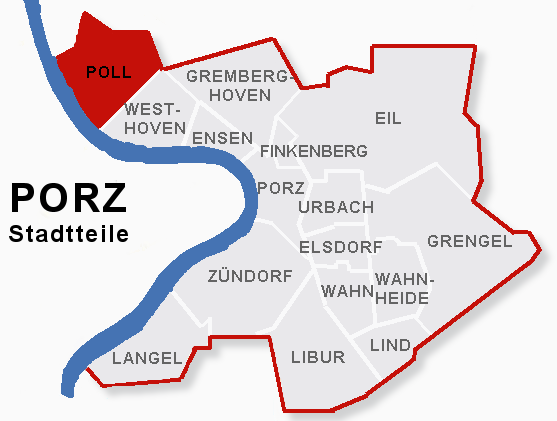
map of Poll within the district of Porz

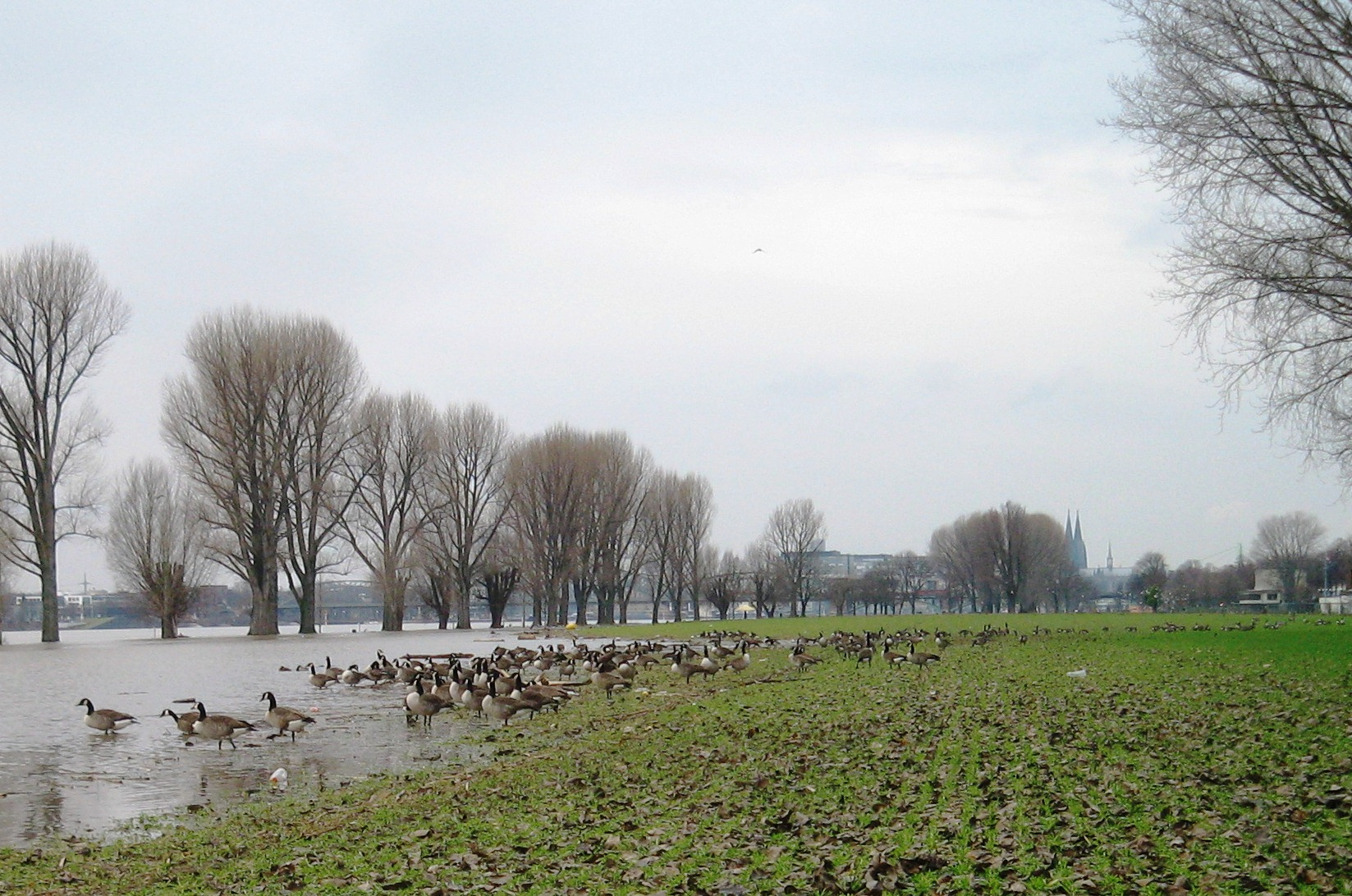
High water on the "Poller Wiesen", which are a popular location for outdoor festivals

Poll (German: Köln-Poll [ˈkœln ˈpɔl]; Kölsch: Poll [ˈpɔ́l]) is a quarter of the city of Cologne, in North Rhine-Westphalia, Germany. It is part of the borough of Porz.

== Location ==
Polls natural border to the west is the Rhine. To the south it is the Bundesautobahn 4 and the Cologne Rodenkirchen Bridge, to the east is Bundesautobahn 559, and to the north is the railroad embankment leading to the Südbrücke, which is crossing the Rhine.

== History ==
Poll was already inhabited during the New Stone Age; etymologically the name originates in a meaning like Swamp. The first documented mention of Poll was on 1 April 1003, by monks from nearby Deutz Abbey, which was part of the Electorate of Cologne. The village Poll was suburbanized in 1889, and became a quarter of Cologne. Since 1975. it is part of the borough of Porz.

== Transportation ==
Poll is served by the Bundesautobahn 4, Bundesautobahn 559 and three light rail stations of the Cologne Stadtbahn line 7. The Cologne Rodenkirchen Bridge connects Poll with Rodenkirchen. It was destroyed by an airstrike on 14 January 1945, but was rebuilt from 1952 to 1954. The Südbrücke was also destroyed in January 1945 and is in service again since 1950. This railway bridge is used mainly for goods traffic.
