= Kölner Rudergesellschaft 1891 =

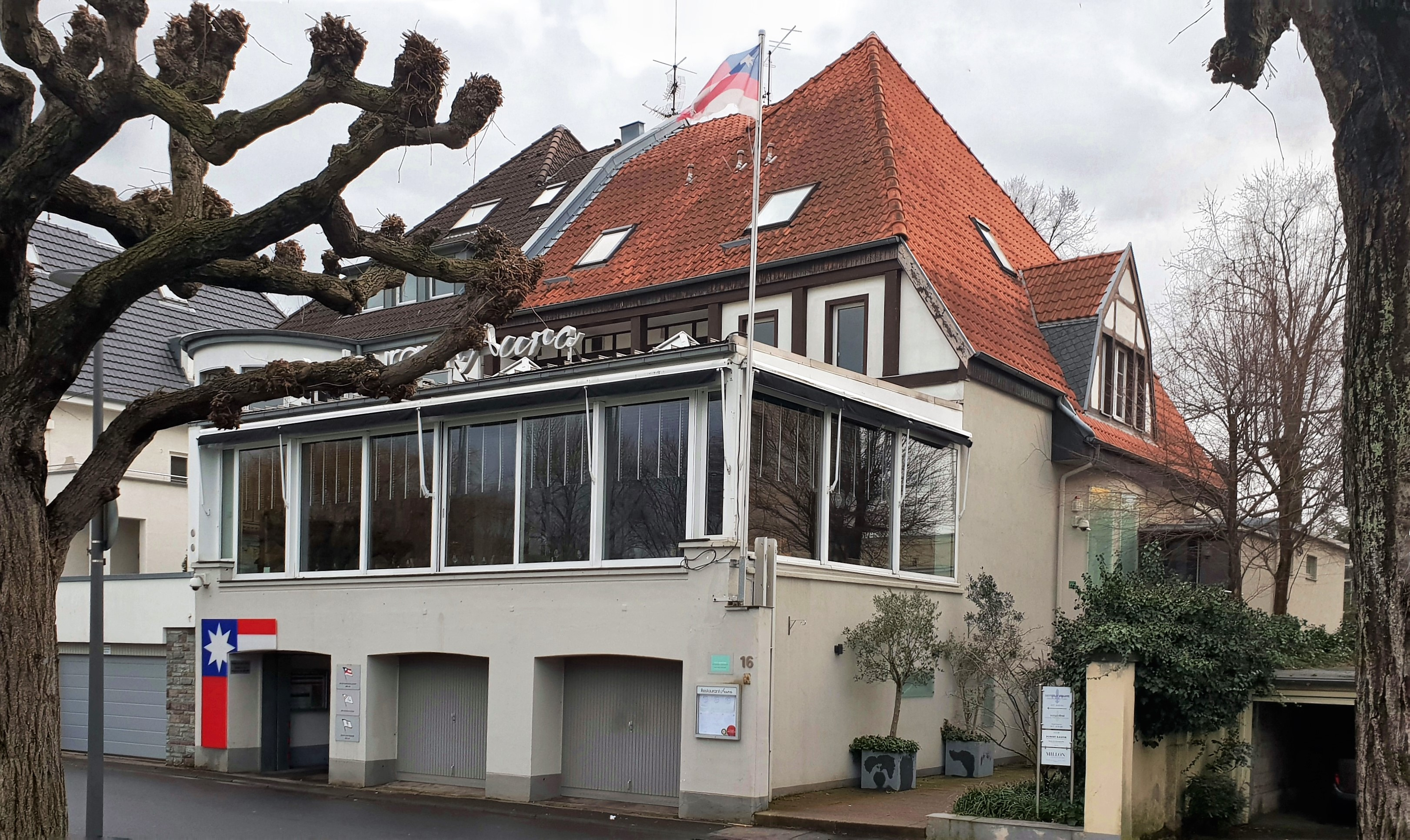

- Location: Uferstraße 16; 50996 Köln (Cologne); Germany
- Coordinates: 50°53′32″N 7°00′08″E
- Home water: Rhine
- Founded: 15 May 1891
- Key people: Hans‑Gerd Falderbaum (Chairman)
- Membership: 150
- Championships: 3 6 5
- Colours
- Affiliations: Deutscher Ruderverband; Kölner Regattaverband; Kölner Stadtsportbund
- Website: www.krg1891.de

Events
- Kölnvierer; An annually local quad scull race, established by the KRG in 2016.

The Kölner Rudergesellschaft 1891 (abbr. Kölner RG 1891 or just KRG, transl. Cologne Rowing Association or often Koelner RG 1891 in English media) is a rowing club from the German city of Cologne.

== Overview ==
It is the second oldest rowing organisation in the Cologne Bay Area and has won 14 medals in the German rowing championships.

The club was founded in 1891 by craftsmen from the former working class. In 1898 the club joined the German Rowing Association, and in 1913 it was one of the founding members of the Cologne Regatta Union. It was the first German rowing organisation to allow full membership for non-academic athletes. Overall, the club experienced its most successful racing years in the economic boom of the Golden Twenties celebrating German championships in 1926 and 1927 in various boat categories. Again in 1954, the club reached the first place at the German championships in a coxed four boat. The women's squad of the club celebrated its greatest successes in 1961.

In 1992, the club was honored by the German federal president Richard von Weizsäcker for its special services to the care and development of rowing in Germany.

Since 2014, the club is primarily active in recreational rowing and offers also activities in indoor rowing. For its training, the club uses the river Rhine and the artificial Otto Maigler Lake in the suburbs of Cologne. The current boathouse of the club was built in 1931 in the city district of Rodenkirchen and contains a fitness gymnasium, a tennis court, and a sports hall which can be used for different indoor team sports like basketball.

Due to the Coronavirus pandemic, the club canceled all its activities in the first half of 2020 for some months, but returned to training sessions in autumn and took part at the remotely organized Head of the Charles Regatta.
