= Bundesautobahn 559 =

Federal motorway in Germany

A 559
- Bundesautobahn 559
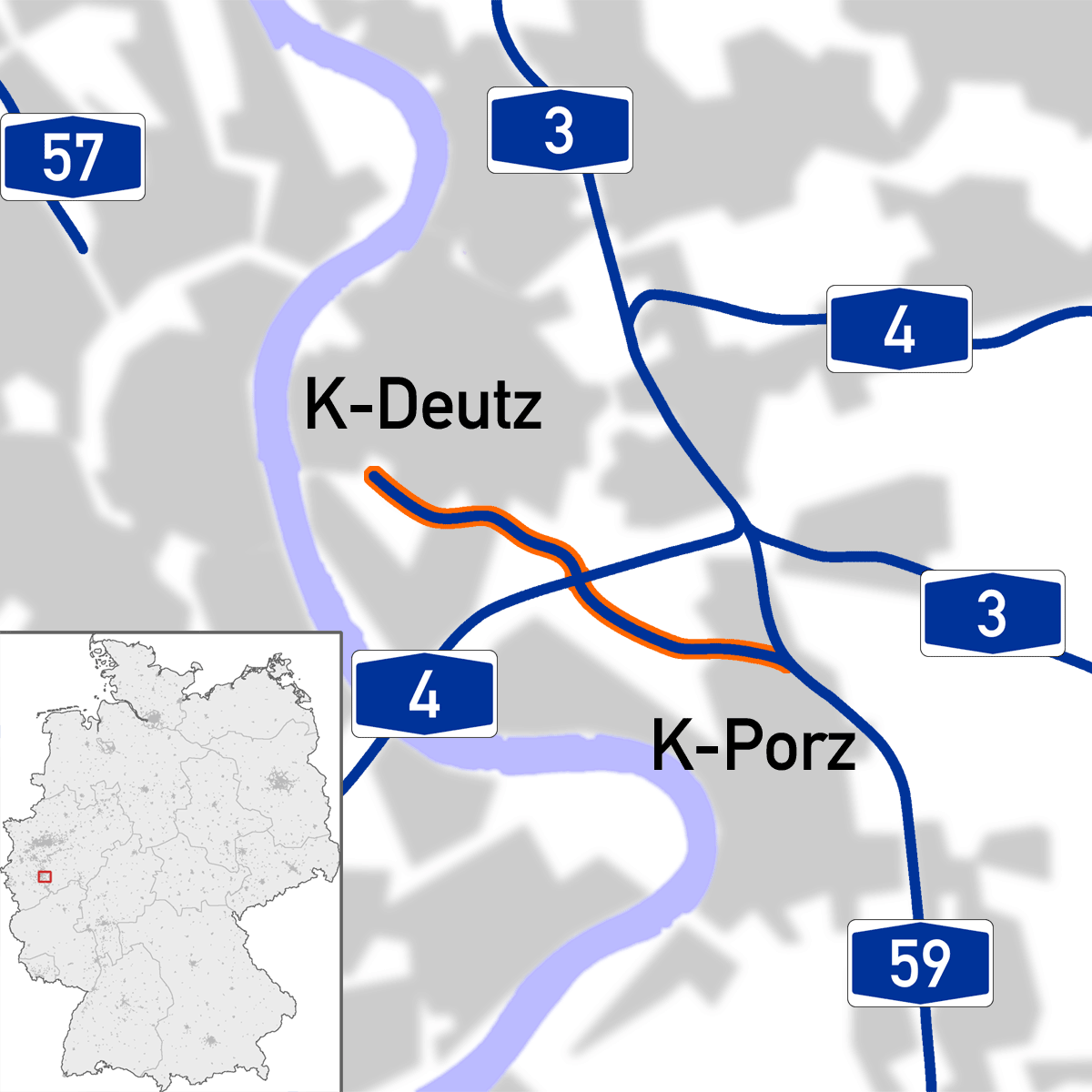

Route information
- Length: 4.2 km (2.6 mi) A further 4.2 km is designated as the L124

Major junctions
- North end: Deutz, Cologne
- South end: Gremberghoven, Cologne

Location
- Country: Germany
- States: North Rhine-Westphalia

Highway system
- Roads in Germany; Autobahns; List; Federal; List; State; E-roads

Bundesautobahn 559 (translates from German as Federal Motorway 559, short form Autobahn 559, abbreviated as BAB 559 or A 559) is an autobahn in Germany.

The A 559 is a former alignment of the A 59. The A 59 was rerouted in the 1980s to relieve congestion at the Gremberg four-way interchange with the A 4.

The primary function of the A 559, besides relieving traffic at the A 4 interchange, is to connect the Cologne-Bonn Airport to Cologne proper. The airport is along the A 59, one junction south of the A 559's southern terminus.

The section of road from the junction Köln-Vingst (just after the A 4) to the end of the freeway at Köln-Deutz is up to autobahn standards, but is only designated as the L 124. This stretch of road was signed at one time as the A 559, although the autobahn designation never officially covered the entire freeway.

== Exit list ==
L111		Road continues as the L 111 into Köln
	(-)	Köln-Deutz
	(-)	Severinsbrücke B 55
	(-)	Köln-Am Grauen Stein
	(-)	Köln-Kalk
	(-)	Köln-Vingst
	(1)	4-way interchange Gremberg A 4 E40
	(2)	Köln-Gremberghoven B 8
Intersection	(3)	3-way interchange Köln-Porz A 59
