= Köln Steinstraße station =

Railway station in Germany

Köln Steinstraße
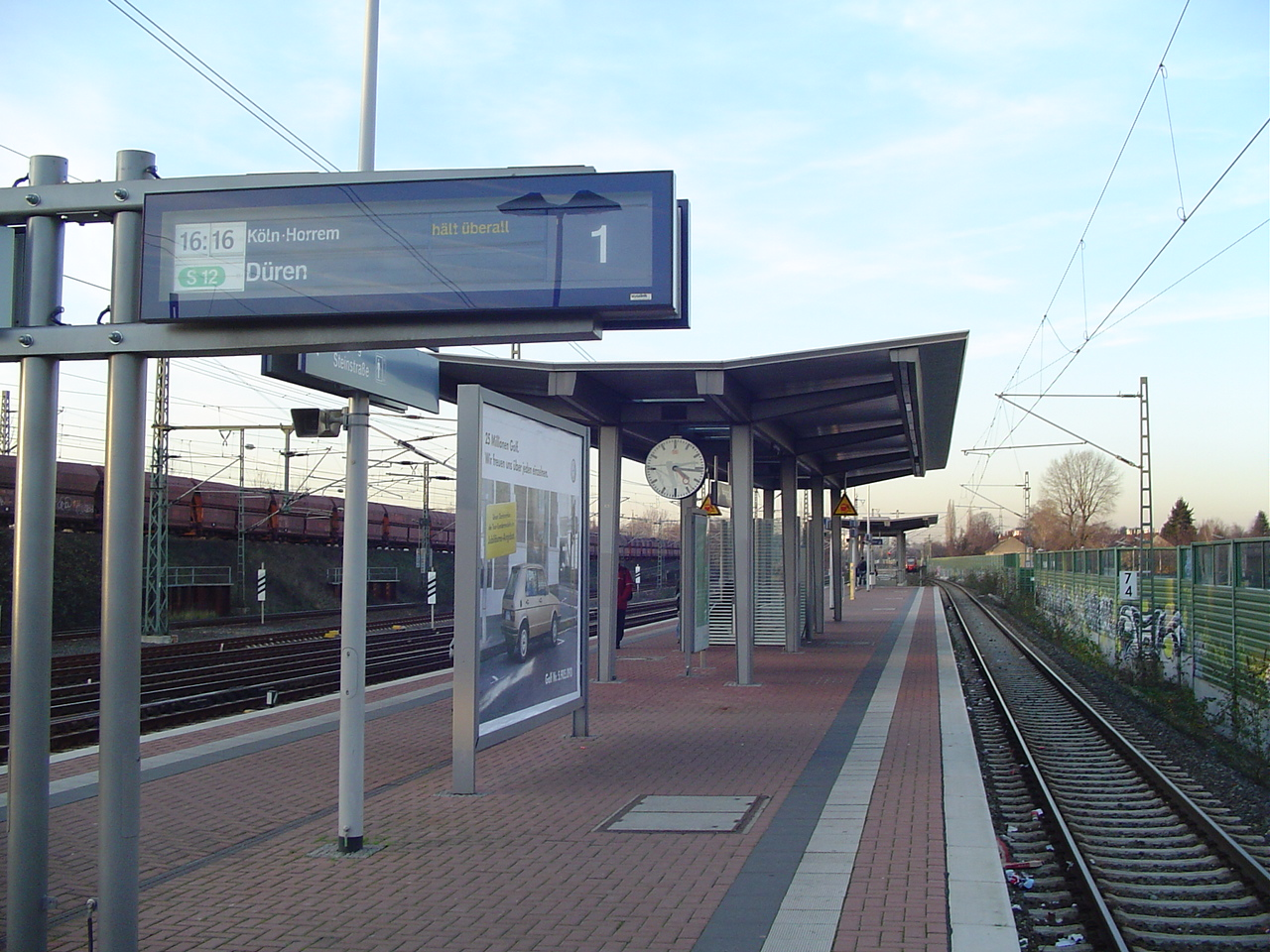

General information
- Location: Cologne, NRW; Germany
- Coordinates: 50°53′43″N 7°03′28″E
- Lines: Sieg Railway; East Rhine Railway

Construction
- Accessible: Yes

Other information
- Station code: 2090
- DS100 code: KSTP
- Category: 5
- Fare zone: VRS: 2100
- Website: www.bahnhof.de

History
- Opened: 14 December 2003

Services
Preceding station	Cologne S-Bahn	Following station
Köln Airport-Businesspark towards Horrem	S12	Porz (Rhein) towards Au (Sieg)
Preceding station	Cologne Stadtbahn	Following station
Ensen Klosterstraße towards Frechen-Benzelrath	Line 7	Porz Markt towards Zündorf
Location
- Location within North Rhine-Westphalia

Köln Steinstraße is a railway station situated at Porz, Cologne in western Germany on the Sieg and East Rhine Railways. It is classified by Deutsche Bahn as a category 5 station.

== Rail services ==
Köln Steinstraße station is served by Cologne S-Bahn S12 line between Düren or Köln-Ehrenfeld and Troisdorf every 20 minutes Monday–Saturday and every 30 minutes on Sunday.

=== Local services ===
With only 400 meters (5 minutes) lies the Porz Steinstraße station served by the Cologne Stadtbahn line 7. This station consists of 2 side platforms.
