= Cologne Rodenkirchen Bridge =

Bridge crossing the Rhine south of Cologne, Germany

Coordinates: 50°53′59″N 6°59′26″E

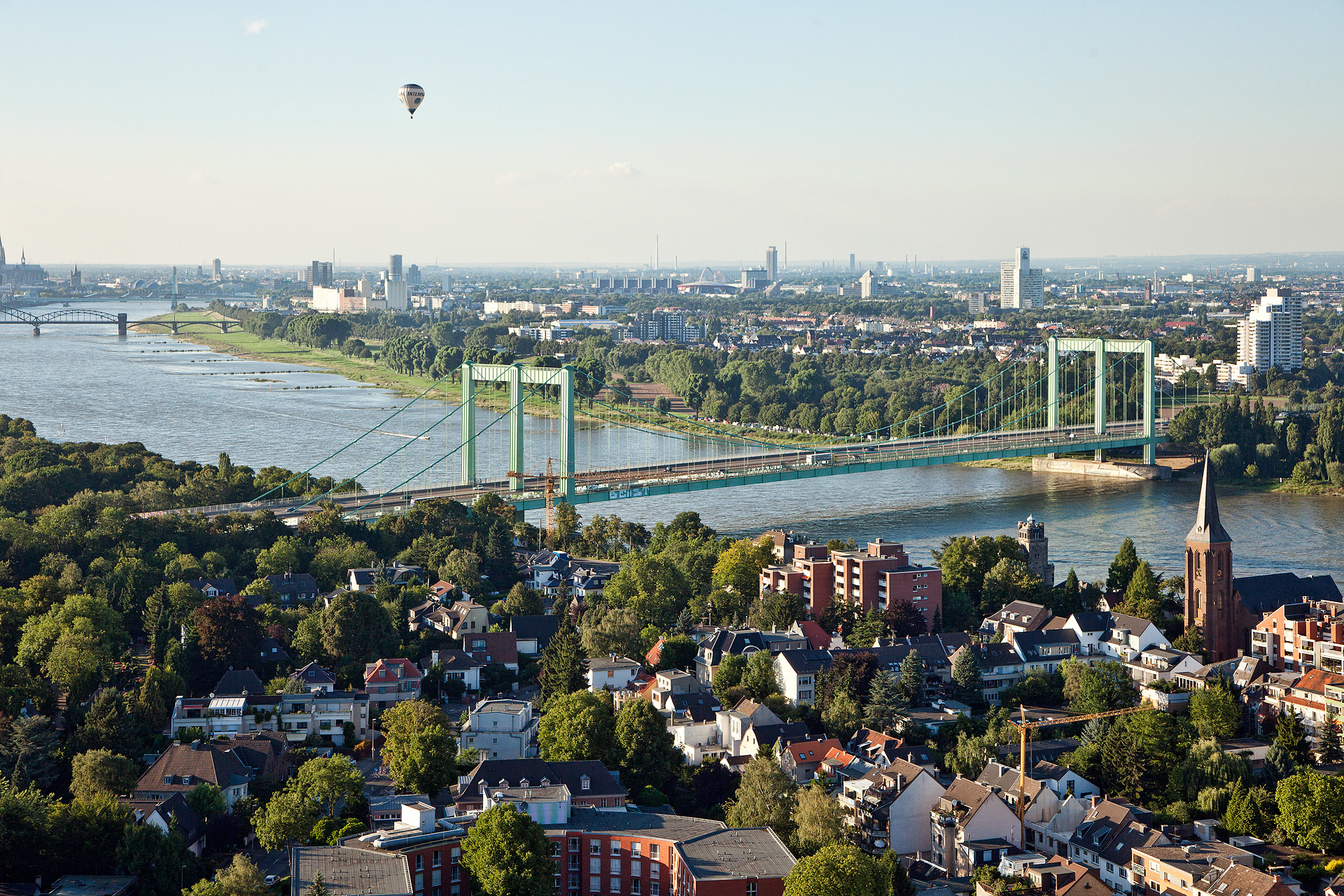
aerial view from the south; Rodenkirchen in the foreground, Poll in the background

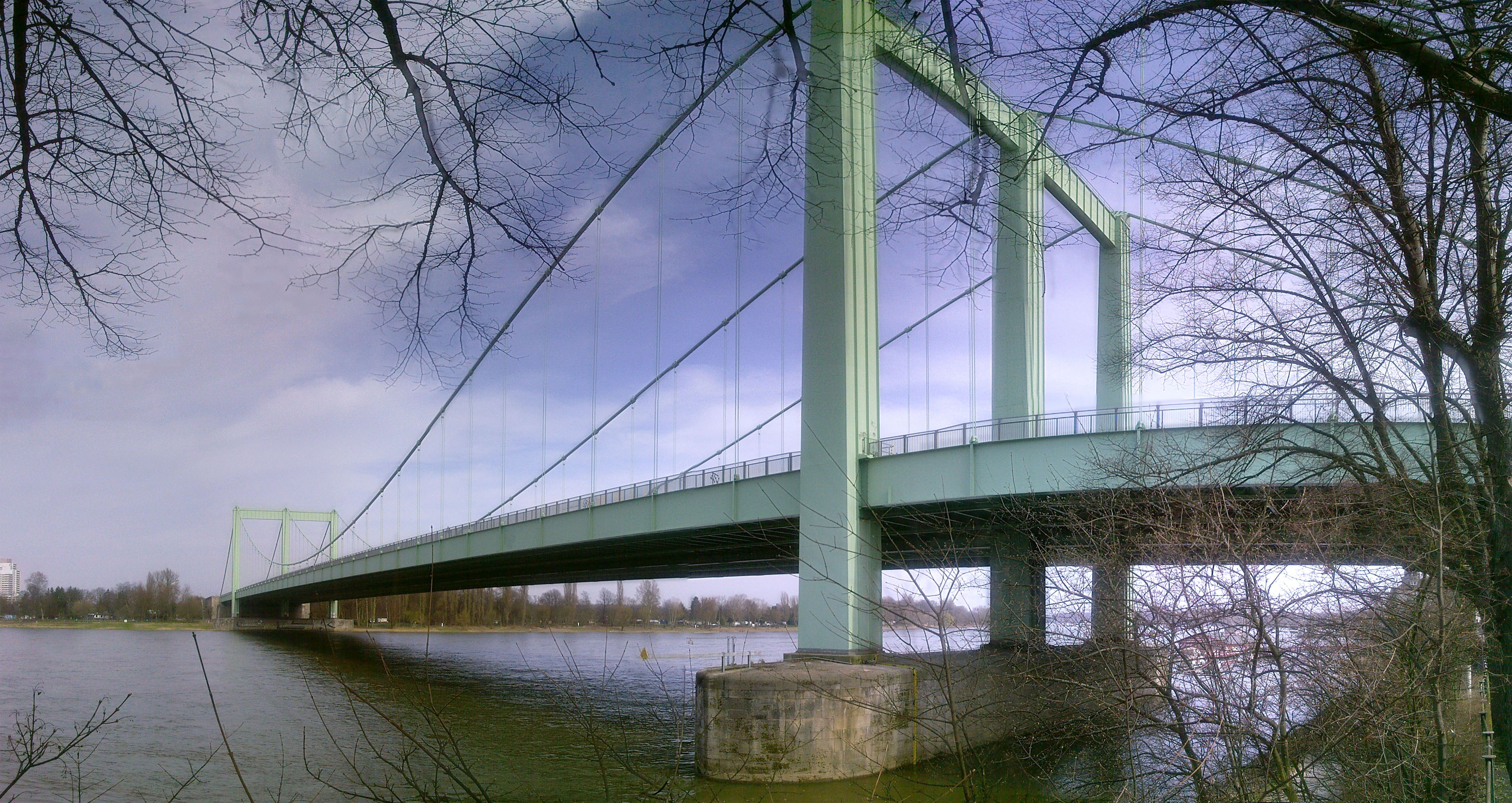
close up view

The Cologne Rodenkirchen Bridge is a steel suspension bridge over the Rhine located in Cologne, Germany. Completed in 1954, it has a main span of 378 metres. It was named after the Cologne district of Rodenkirchen.

== Planning and construction ==
It was built from 1938 to 1941, after the design of Paul Bonatz and the planning of Fritz Leonhardt, for the Autobahn Cologne-Aachen. Today the Bundesautobahn 4 is the southern wing of the Cologne Beltway.

On 14 January 1945 an airstrike destroyed the bridge.

It was rebuilt from 1952 to 1954, with the old pylons re-used. The old bridge had 6100 tons of steel and the new bridge has only 3350.

Because of the increasing traffic on the bridge, in 1990 it was expanded with an equal bridge, sharing the middle cable with the 1954 bridge. The expansion was finished in 1995.

== See also ==
- List of bridges in Germany
