= TÜV Rheinland =

German multinational company

Coordinates: 50.924167°N 6.9925°E

- Type: Public
- Industry: Technical inspection organization
- Founded: 1872
- Headquarters: Cologne-Poll, Germany
- Key people: Michael Fübi (Chairman of the Board)
- Revenue: €2.71 billion (2024)
- Number of employees: 25,900 (2024)
- Website: www.tuv.com

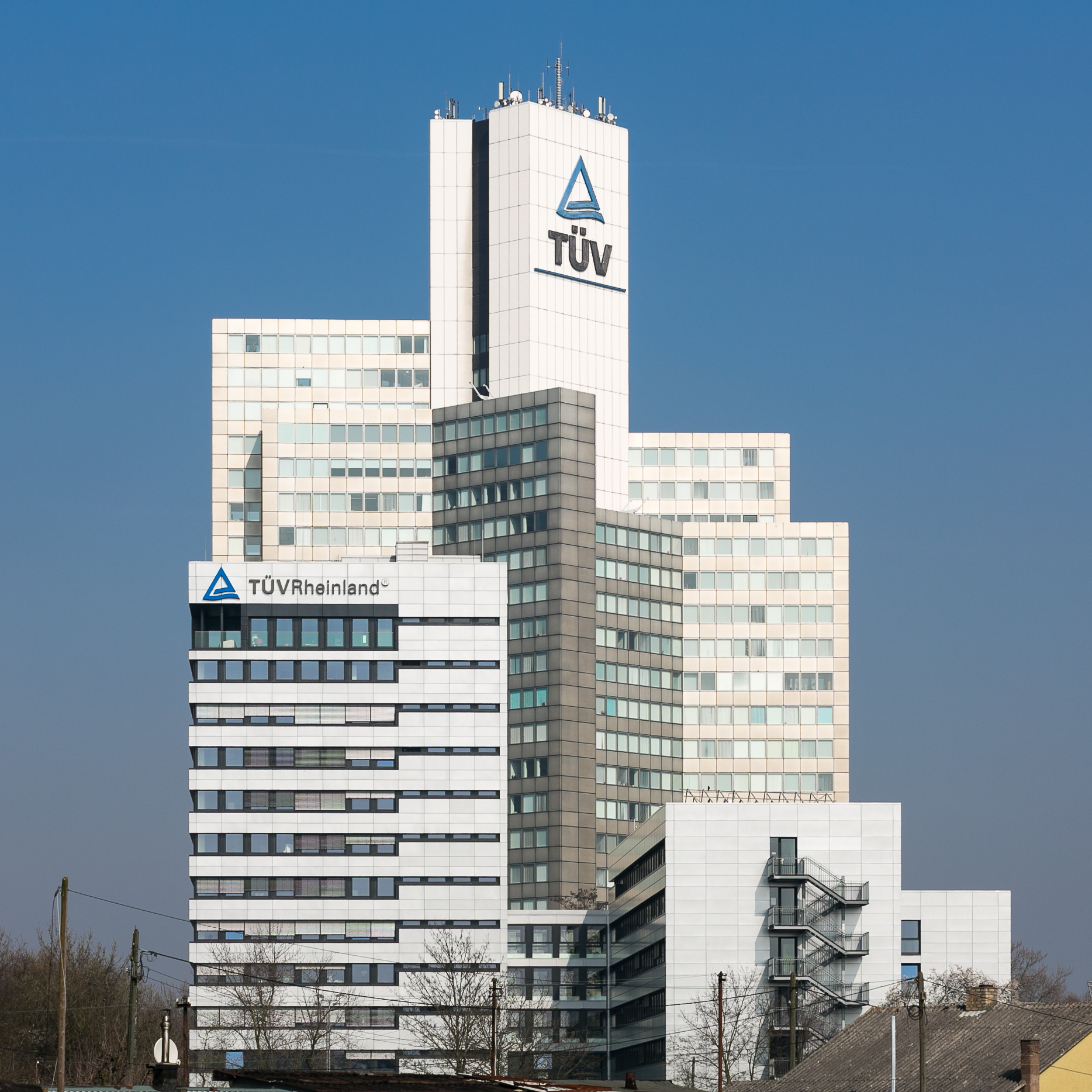
Headquarters in Cologne-Poll

TÜV Rheinland is a German multinational company headquartered in Cologne-Poll, which provides testing, inspection and certification services. Of the three competing TÜV corporate groups in Germany, TÜV Rheinland is the most internationally oriented. The chairman of the board is Michael Fübi, and the chairman of the supervisory board is Michael Hüther.

With 25,900 employees, TÜV Rheinland generated revenue of €2.71 billion in 2024 and an EBIT of €214.8 million. Of the revenue, 52.4 percent came from business outside Germany. 16,400 employees work outside Germany, and 9,500 within.

== History ==
In the course of the industrial revolution, steam engines were introduced into factories in the 19th century. However, many steam boilers could not withstand the stresses, resulting in numerous boiler explosions with casualties and injuries. On October 31, 1872, entrepreneurs chaired by the textile manufacturer Gustav Schlieper independently founded the "Association for the Supervision of Steam Boilers in the Districts of Elberfeld and Barmen". Elberfeld-Barmen (today Wuppertal) was the first large industrial urban area in continental Europe. Further associations were founded in Koblenz (July 6, 1873), Aachen (November 17, 1873), and Mönchengladbach (April 1, 1874). The goal of the associations was to minimize the explosion risk of steam boilers by supervising the technology. These associations were subsequently entrusted by the German Empire with the task of conducting sovereign safety inspections. On April 1, 1877, 80 steam boiler operators in the Rhineland merged to form the "Rhenish Steam Boiler Inspection Association Cologne-Düsseldorf" (DÜV) headquartered in Düsseldorf.

Towards the end of the 19th century, the motorization in Germany began. The first driving permit in Germany was issued in 1888 to Carl Benz, the inventor of the automobile. From 1900, the DÜV inspected the first motor vehicles and conducted driving license tests. With increasing motorization, on September 29, 1903, Prussian ministerial decree introduced the first fundamental, nationwide regulation of motor vehicle driver examinations. Experts of the DÜV were recommended for the tests.

On April 1, 1909, the Rhenish Steam Boiler Association split into two independent associations, the Rhenish D.Ü.V. Düsseldorf-Essen and the D.Ü.V. Cologne. Due to further industrial society technologization, in 1918 the DÜV expanded its activities to mining and energy sectors. In 1936, the Rhenish DÜV became the "Technical Inspection Association Cologne", or TÜV Cologne. The license to conduct driver examinations had to be given up in 1940 to engineers of the National Socialist Motor Corps (NSKK); only in 1950 was TÜV allowed to conduct driving tests again.

In the early 1960s, the "TÜV Cologne" had grown to 600 employees and had expanded to six locations in the Rhineland. In 1962, the company was renamed "TÜV Rheinland e. V.". Under the chairmanship of Albert Kuhlmann, the company first began national and, shortly thereafter, international expansion: the first German TÜV Rheinland subsidiary was founded in 1967, followed by the first foreign subsidiary in 1970. In the same year, construction of the new company headquarters Am Grauen Stein in the Cologne district Cologne-Poll began. The 11 m high skyscraper, a work of architect Helmut Hentrich, was occupied in 1974.

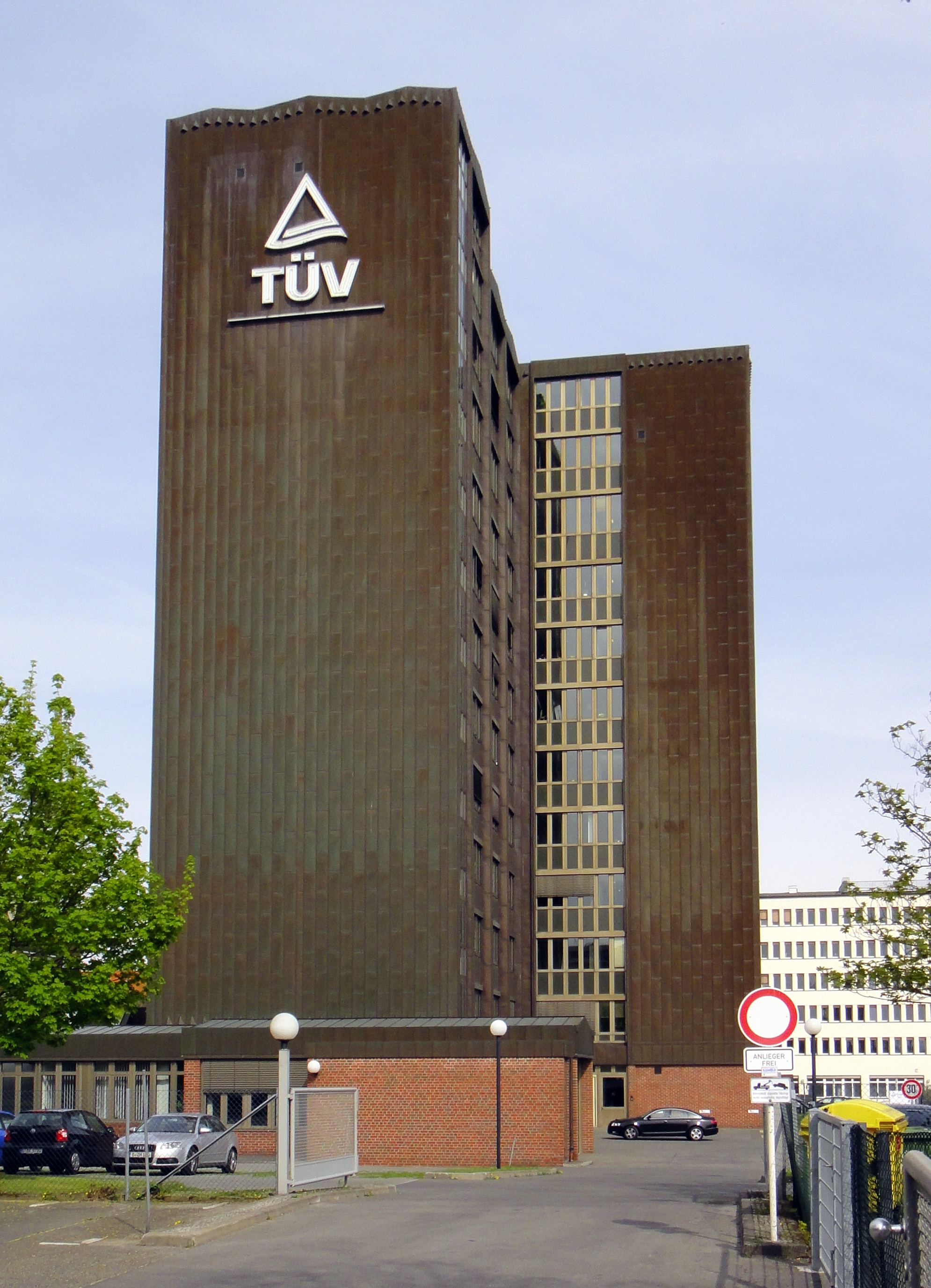
TÜV Rheinland in Berlin

To manage the operational companies, TÜV Rheinland AG was founded in 1993. In 1997 TÜV Rheinland merged with TÜV Berlin-Brandenburg e. V. to form "TÜV Rheinland Berlin Brandenburg e. V." Another merger took place in 2003 with TÜV Pfalz e. V. to form "TÜV Rheinland Berlin Brandenburg Pfalz e. V.".

At the same time, the corporate group was renamed "TÜV Rheinland Group" and increasingly oriented itself as an internationally operating company. In 2005, the Bavarian State Trade Institute (LGA) and two large Hungarian testing institutes were integrated.

Through extensive acquisitions in 2006 and 2010, TÜV Rheinland became one of the largest independent testing companies in Brazil with well over 1,800 employees. Since the establishment of its subsidiary in Australia in 2007, TÜV Rheinland has been active on all continents. In 2012, TÜV Rheinland generated more revenue outside Germany than inside Germany for the first time in the company's history. Around 60 percent of employees work outside Germany.

On September 29, 2014, the supervisory board appointed Michael Fübi as chairman of the board effective January 1, 2015.

== Operations ==
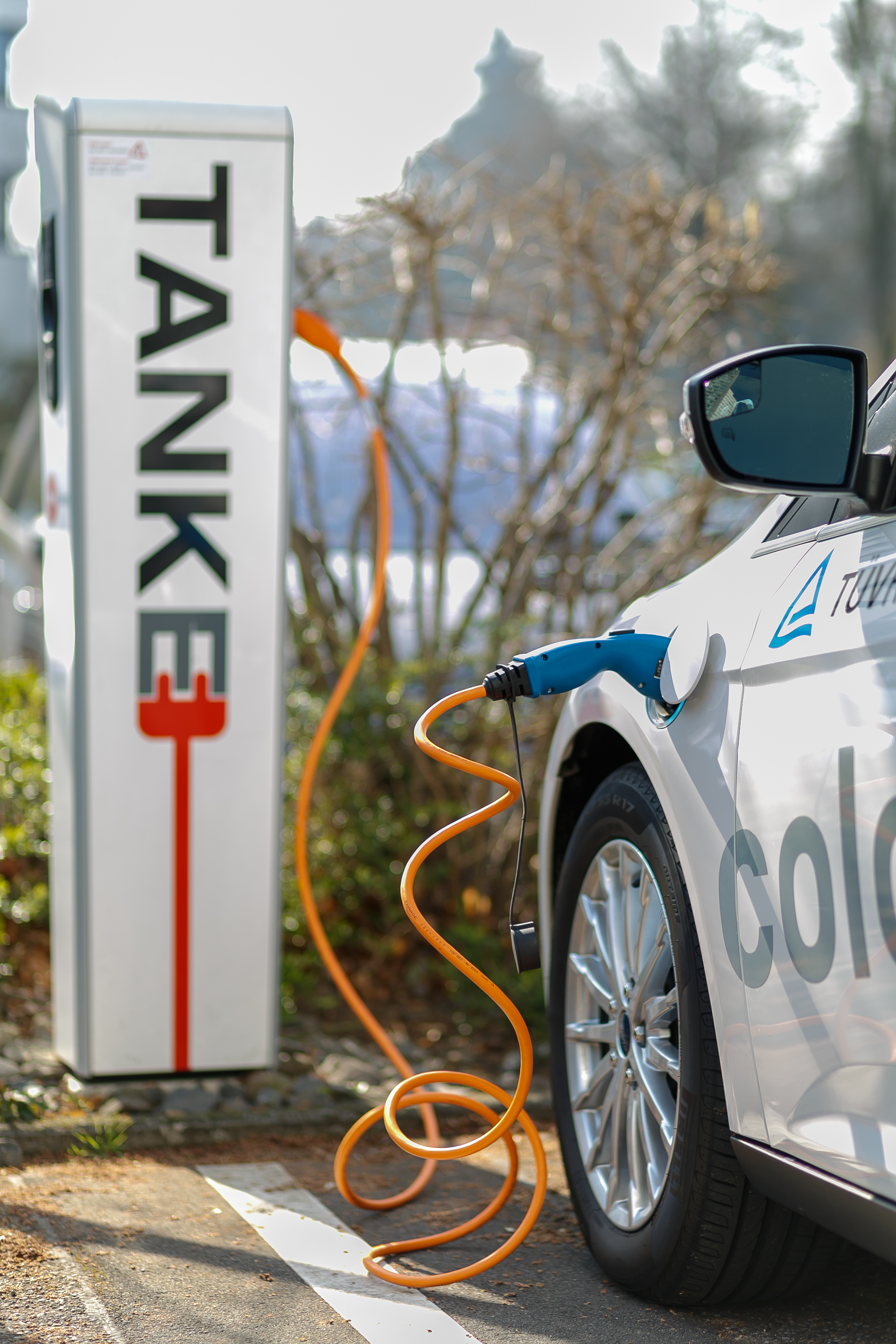
Electric vehicle charging station in front of company headquarters in Cologne

The company bundles its services into four business units: Industrial Service & Cyber Security, Mobility, as well as Products, People & Business Assurance. TÜV Rheinland tests technical systems, products, and services, supports projects, and designs processes for companies.

TÜV Rheinland also takes on tasks in some countries to relieve the state, such as vehicle and industrial plant inspections as well as conducting driving license tests.

=== Industrial Service and Cybersecurity ===
The largest business unit in industrial inspection includes classical inspection of industrial plants, power plants, steam boilers, pressure vessels, and elevators, as well as the areas of construction technology, infrastructure, and project management. Additionally, there is the area of information security with consulting and certification. TÜV Rheinland is increasingly active in the energy sector. This applies to inspections and certifications in renewable energies as well as infrastructure and conventional power plant technology or the oil and gas industry. The company maintains a broad network of solar energy assessment centers focusing on testing and certifying photovoltaic modules.

=== Mobility ===
TÜV Rheinland annually inspects the safety of 8.6 million vehicles in Germany and worldwide. In the vehicle inspection area, TÜV Rheinland operates 275 test centers in Chile, Germany, France, Latvia, and Spain, as well as test centers for passive safety, exhaust, and engine technology. Another field is damage and value appraisal, including specialized markets for high-value classic cars. Internationally, TÜV continues to expand services in railway technology.

=== Products ===
TÜV Rheinland tests the safety, usability, functionality, and quality of products worldwide. The company is active as a testing service provider from development to market approval, nationally and internationally. Testing takes place in areas including medical, protective clothing, children's toys, cosmetics, food, vehicles, and electronics.

=== People and Business Assurance ===
As of January 1, 2024, TÜV Rheinland consolidated in the People and Business Assurance business unit all services previously offered in the two business units "Academy and Life Care" and "Systems".

In the former Academy and Life Care area, TÜV Rheinland bundled numerous services related to people at their workplace and professional environment. These include personnel and organizational development, training and seminars, occupational health management, occupational medicine and safety, personnel certification, labor market services, and digital transformation. The business unit is one of the largest private educational providers in Germany in the field of further education and personnel development. Outside Germany, TÜV Rheinland Academy operates in 24 countries, including China, India, France, Spain, Poland, and Saudi Arabia.

The former Systems area evaluates management systems according to internationally recognized standards or individual performance criteria. Major standards reviewed include quality management, environmental management, and occupational health and safety. Since 2014, TÜV Rheinland offers an employer certificate to make a company's value orientation visible. Criteria relate to assessment of personnel management strategies and practices with respect to recruitment and development. Additional modules such as "parent-friendliness" and "fit for foreign specialists" are offered.

== Laboratories ==
The largest laboratory centers of the so-called Global Technology Assessment Centers (GTAC) of TÜV Rheinland are in Bangkok, Budapest, Cologne/Nuremberg, Milan, Silicon Valley, Shanghai, and Yokohama. Experts in the GTAC test and certify product quality and safety worldwide, reflecting global goods flows.

TÜV Rheinland is a member of the Global Ecolabelling Network.

Over time, the company developed more than 130 different TÜV Rheinland test marks, used regionally and internationally. Since January 2013, there has been only one TÜV Rheinland test mark: a square, white "button" with the corporate logo and the white inscription "CERTIFIED" on a blue background in the lower quarter of the field. The TÜV Rheinland test mark is supplemented by a ten-digit ID number, publicly accessible on the company website, which provides details on the respective certification. After some time, the page for the ID is taken offline. Combining the test mark with a QR code makes it tamper-proof since verification is possible. Other supplements, depending on certification, may include external marks such as the GS mark or indication of the next inspection. Supplementing the test mark with a keyword clarifies exactly what TÜV Rheinland has tested. Since 2012, certification "Green Products" has also been part of this, for example for routers, washing machines, or furniture.

== Awards ==
In July 2013, the film introducing the new test mark was awarded the Red Dot Design Award. The CRF Institute honored TÜV Rheinland for the ninth consecutive time in 2016 as one of the leading employers in Germany.

== Issues ==
=== PIP ===
In connection with the health scandal of the French medical device manufacturer Poly Implant Prothèse (PIP), TÜV Rheinland was criticized as the notified body responsible for certifying the PIP implants as implantable medical devices in connection with the CE marking. TÜV Rheinland was responsible for inspecting the quality management and compliance with the European medical device directive. The company claims it was itself a victim of PIP's criminal actions and has been legally active against the implant manufacturer since the irregularities became known in March 2010. So far, two courts in first instance have ruled that TÜV Rheinland bears no negligence in connection with the PIP implants. The CEO of TÜV Rheinland calls for changes to testing regulations as a consequence of the scandal to better prevent extreme criminal acts in the future. He proposes a 4-point program mandating type testing, sampling from production, and inspections of already delivered products. Supervisory authorities should also be obliged to include testing organizations in their information flow. In January 2013, TÜV Rheinland was sued for damages by a 62-year-old woman from Ludwigshafen affected by the implants. On September 12, 2013, the health insurance AOK Bayern filed a lawsuit against TÜV Rheinland at the Nuremberg-Fürth Regional Court. It demanded damages for the costs of operations to remove breast implants from 27 insured persons.

=== Textile factories in Bangladesh ===
On June 6, 2013, ARD Monitor reported on lax TÜV Rheinland controls in textile factories in Bangladesh. Social standards and working conditions of local factory workers were supposed to be monitored. It was criticized that female workers had to work excessive overtime and were occasionally beaten. TÜV Rheinland rejected these allegations in a press release.

== Sources ==
- Clemens Holzhauer: “the silent revolution – 100 years Technical Inspection Association Rhineland”, Verlag TÜV Rheinland, 1972
- Heinz Welz: “Heading Toward the Future with Safety – The History of TÜV Rheinland”, Verlag TÜV Rheinland, 1996
- Jörg Meyer zu Altenschildesche et al.: Inspectors inspect. How TÜV Rheinland works? Verlag TÜV Media, Cologne 2014
