= Bayenthal =

- Stadtteil of Cologne
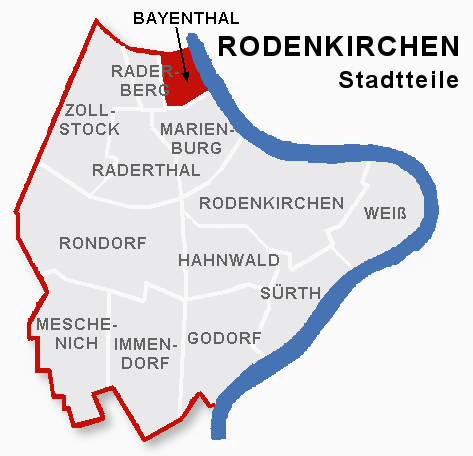
- map of Bayenthal (shown in red) within the district of Rodenkirchen
- Interactive map of Bayenthal
- Location within Germany Location within North Rhine-Westphalia
- Coordinates: 50°54′44″N 6°58′3″E
- Country: Germany
- State: North Rhine-Westphalia
- Admin. region: Cologne
- District: Urban district
- City: Cologne
- Borough: Rodenkirchen
- Time zone: UTC+01:00 (CET)
  - Summer (DST): UTC+02:00 (CEST)

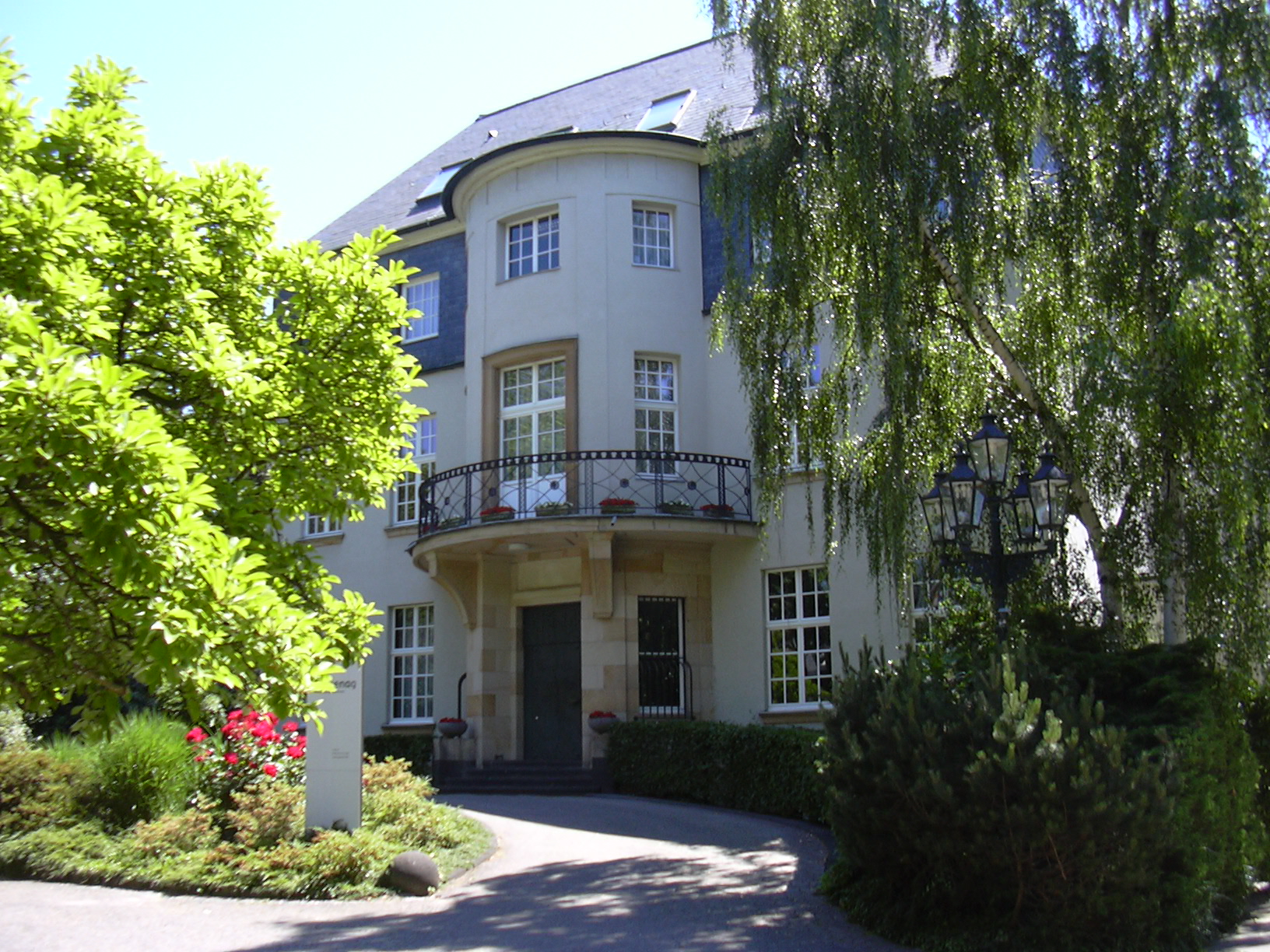
Art Nouveau villa on Bayenthal-gürtel, part of the Cologne Belt

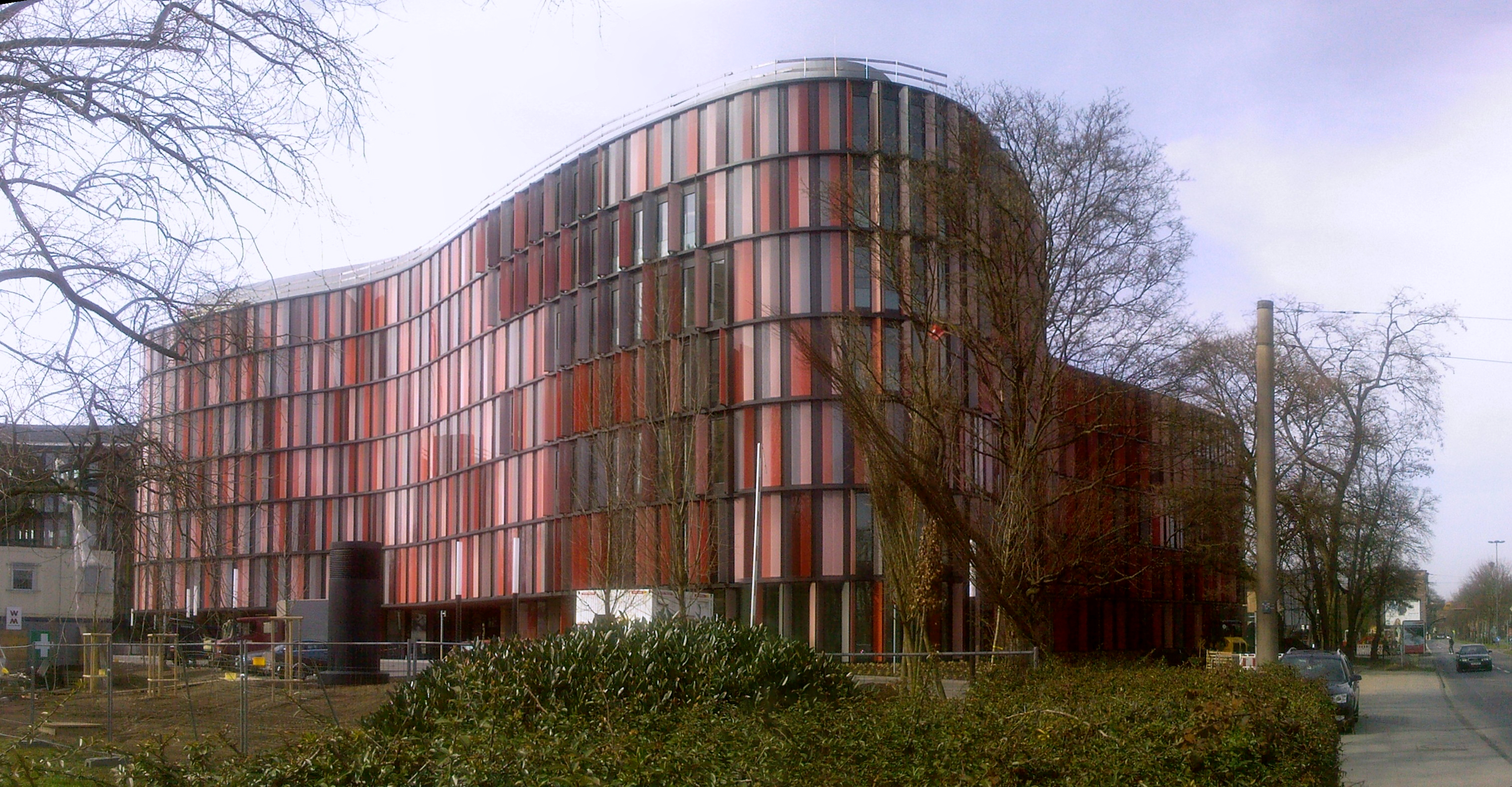
Cologne Oval Offices on Gustav-Heinemann-Ufer

Bayenthal (German pronunciation: [ˈbaɪənˌtaːl]) is a neighbourhood of Cologne, Germany and part of the district of Rodenkirchen. Bayenthal lies on the left bank of the river Rhine, between the district of Innenstadt to the North and Marienburg neighbourhood to the South. The borders to these are defined by the Southern Bridge (Südbrücke) and the Bayenthalgürtel of the Cologne Belt respectively. To the West, Bayenthal borders with Raderberg.

It combines the residential neighbourhoods from adjacent Marienburg with former industrial areas next to the old "Dom" brewery. Bayenthal has 10.285 inhabitants (as of 31 December 2019) and covers an area of 1,28 km^{2} (pop.density of 8.015 inhabitants/km^{2}). The neighbourhood is served by Cologne Stadtbahn lines 16 and 17.
