= Eil, Cologne =

City quarter no. 705 of Cologne, Germany

Coordinates: 50°53′37″N 7°04′23″E

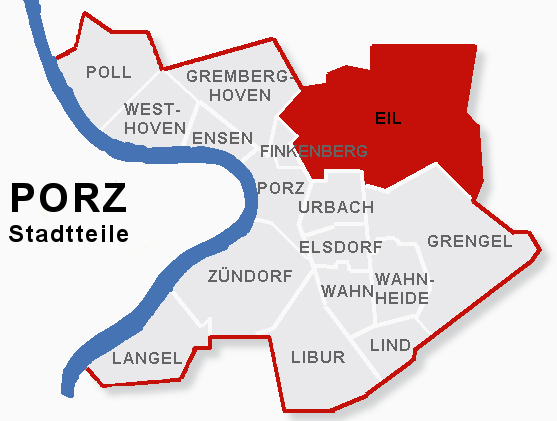
Location of Eil within the city district of Porz

Eil is a suburb of Cologne, Germany located in the city district of Porz, south-east of the city center. With an area totalling 16,24 km^{2}, it is the largest suburb in the city, although not all of the land is built up.

== Overview ==
The center of Eil is located in the southwest of the suburb. To the north is a substantial industrial zone area incorporating a large distribution center belonging to the retailer Kaufhof. In the east the suburb incorporates much of the Wahner Heide nature reserve as well as the walled grounds of Castle Röttgen.

== History ==
The village of Eil first appears in the records in 1268. At that time the inhabitants were very poor, and made a living as day laborers for the local landowners in the nearby manors of Röttgen and Leidenhausen. In the later medieval period Eil passed into the ownership of Porz in the Berg territory. During the rapid urbanisation of the nineteenth century, Eil became the largest settlement in the Heumar administrative region, but still without its own church. In 1903/1904 the church of St Michael was built, and in 1917 Eil finally acquired its own priest.
