= Kalk, Cologne =

Kalk
- Borough of Cologne
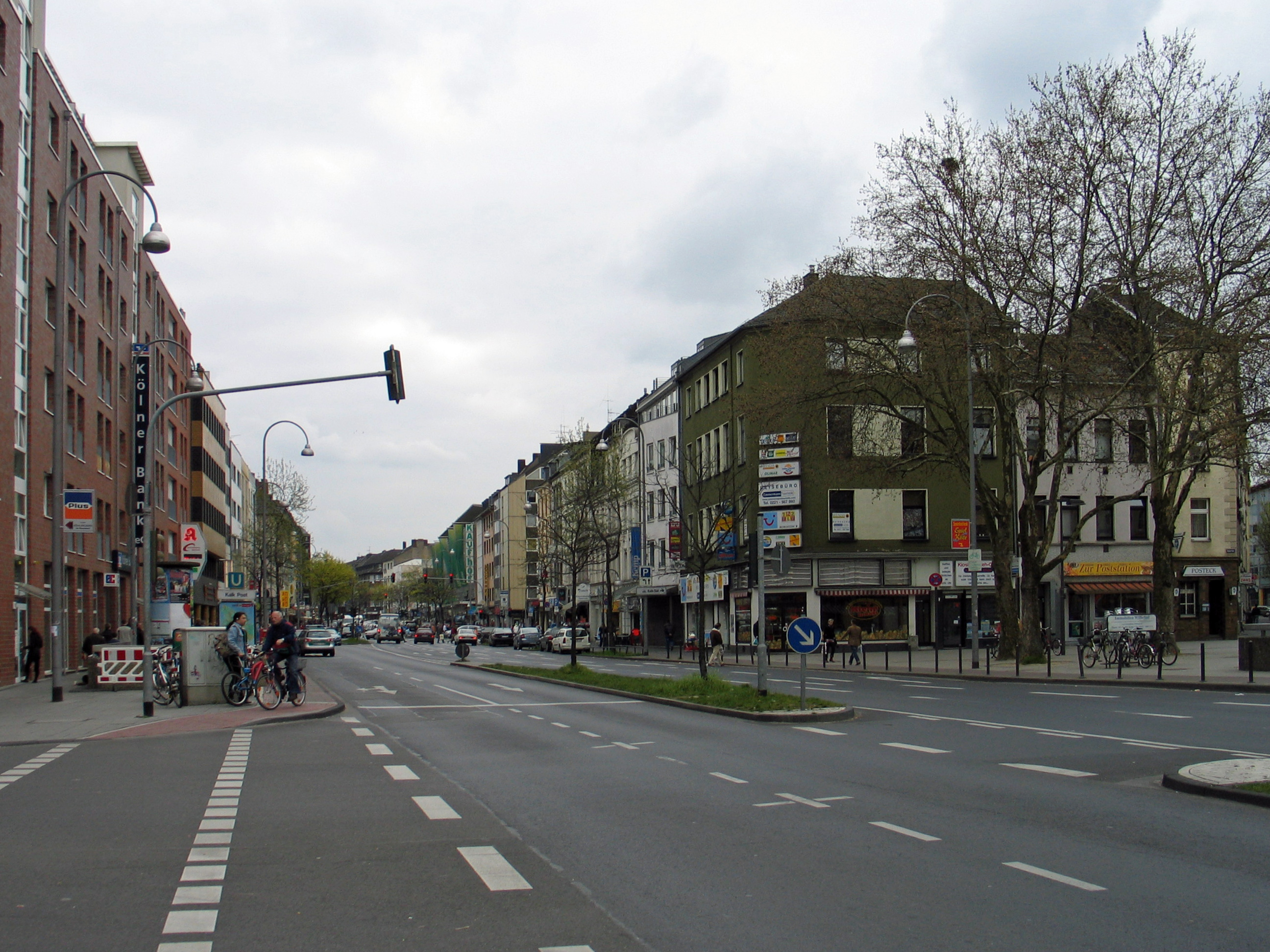
- Kalker Hauptstraße

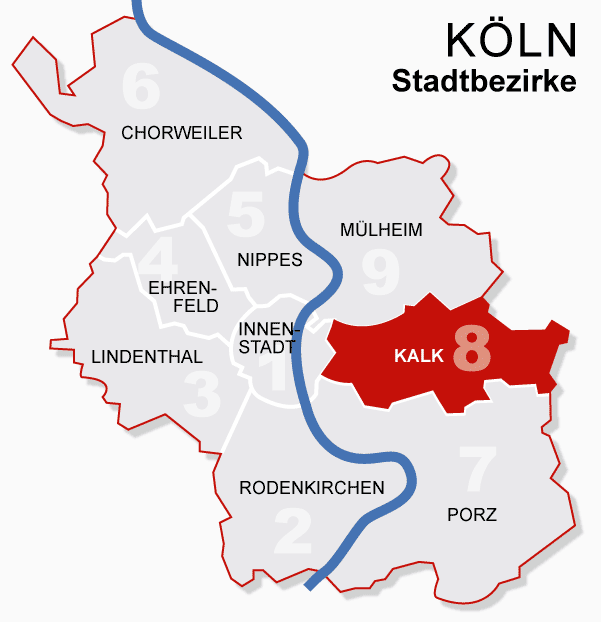
- Location within Cologne
- Interactive map of Kalk
- Location within Germany Location within North Rhine-Westphalia
- Coordinates: 50°56′09″N 7°01′07″E
- Country: Germany
- State: North Rhine-Westphalia
- Admin. region: Cologne
- District: Urban district
- City: Cologne

Area
  - Total: 38.16 km^{2} (14.73 sq mi)

Population (2020-12-31)
  - Total: 120,610
  - Density: 3,161/km^{2} (8,186/sq mi)
- Time zone: UTC+01:00 (CET)
  - Summer (DST): UTC+02:00 (CEST)

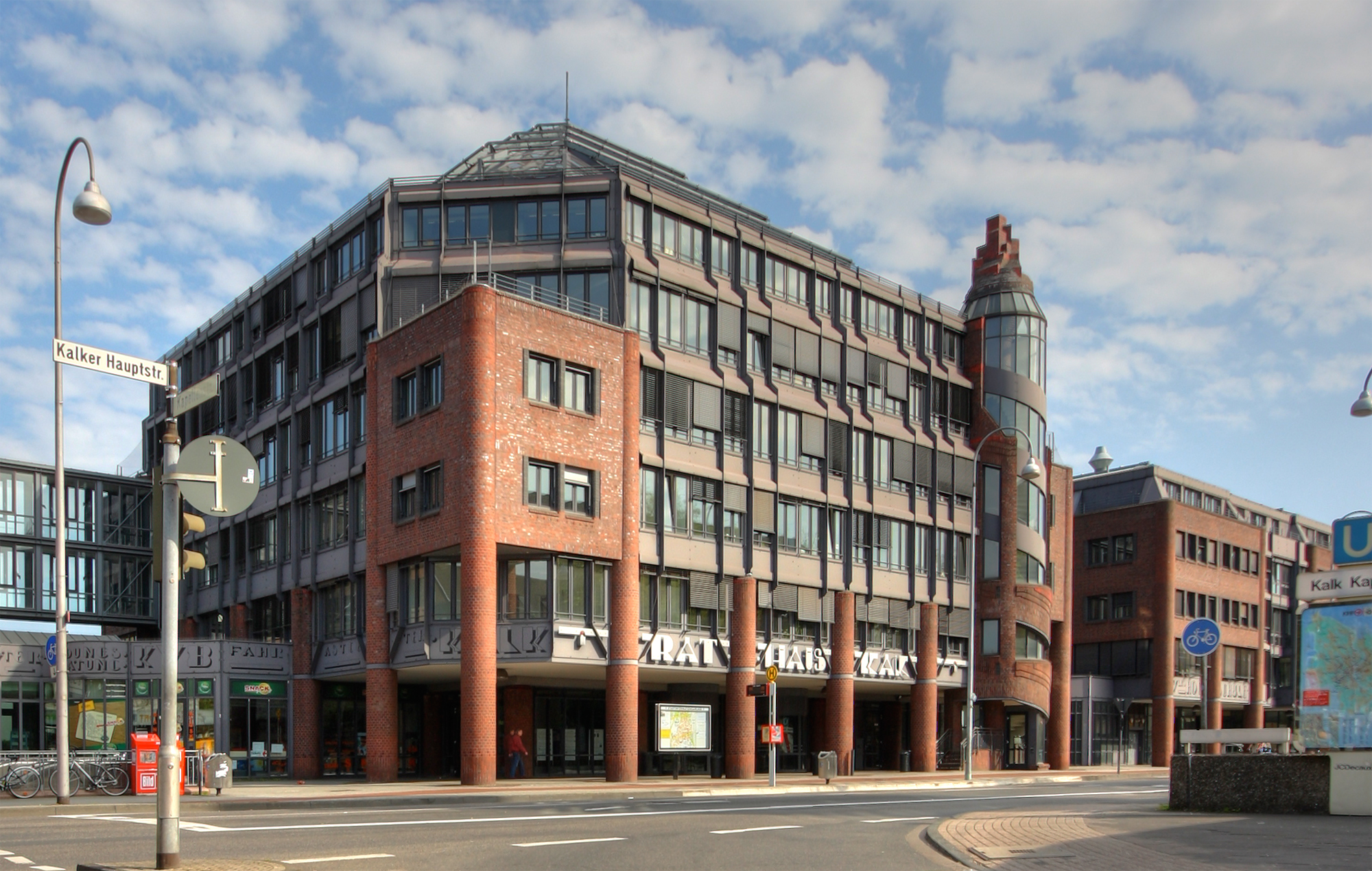
district town hall

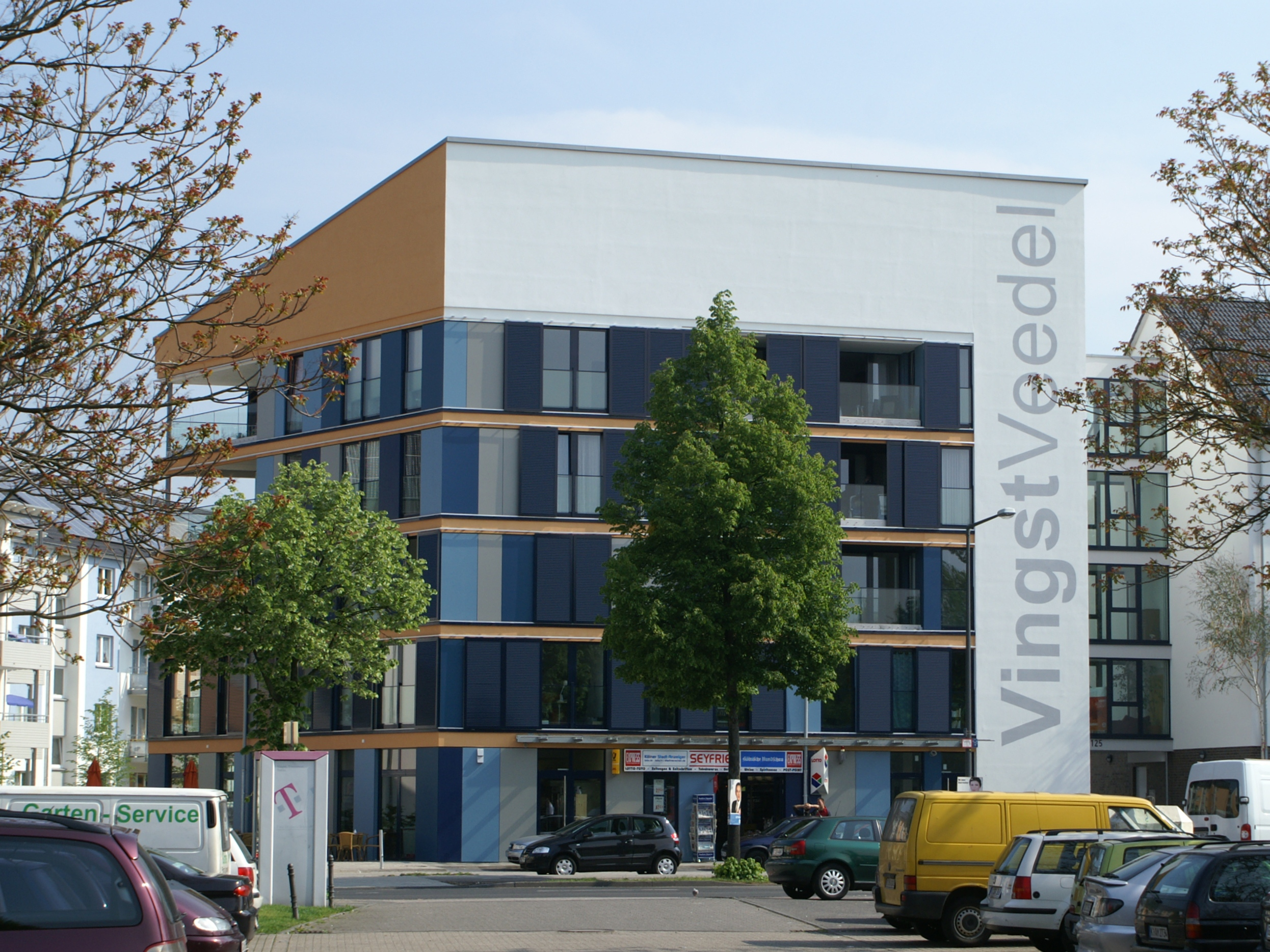
Vingst Veedel

Kalk (German: Köln-Kalk [ˈkœln ˈkalk]; Kölsch: Kallek [ˈkâl(ə)k]) is the Eighth borough or Stadtbezirk of Cologne, Germany. Kalk was merged into the city of Cologne in 1910, the borough was formed in 1975.

The borough of Kalk borders with Mülheim to the North, Rheinisch-Bergischer Kreis to the East, the Cologne borough of Porz to the South and Deutz to the West.

== Subdivisions ==
Kalk consists of nine Stadtteile (city parts):

#	City part	Population (2009)	Area (km^{2})	Pop. per km^{2}	map
801	Humboldt/Gremberg	14,835	2,82	5,258	District map of Kalk
802	Kalk	21,192	2,97	7,128	District map of Kalk
803	Vingst	11,558	1,12	10,315	District map of Kalk
804	Höhenberg	11,936	2,20	5,436	District map of Kalk
805	Ostheim	10,720	3,75	2,862	District map of Kalk
806	Merheim	9,540	3,81	2,507	District map of Kalk
807	Brück	9,734	7,51	1,297	District map of Kalk
808	Rath/Heumar	10,957	13,1	837	District map of Kalk
809	Neubrück	8,573	1,10	7,806	District map of Kalk
source: Die Kölner Stadtteile in Zahlen 2010 (in German)

== Education ==
The Kaiserin-Theophanu-Schule is located in Kalk.

The Japanische Schule Köln e.V. (ケルン日本語補習授業校 Kerun Nihongo Hoshū Jugyō Kō), a Japanese weekend school, holds its classes in the Kaiserin-Theophanu-Schule. It began holding classes there as of 20 August 2009.

== Transportation ==
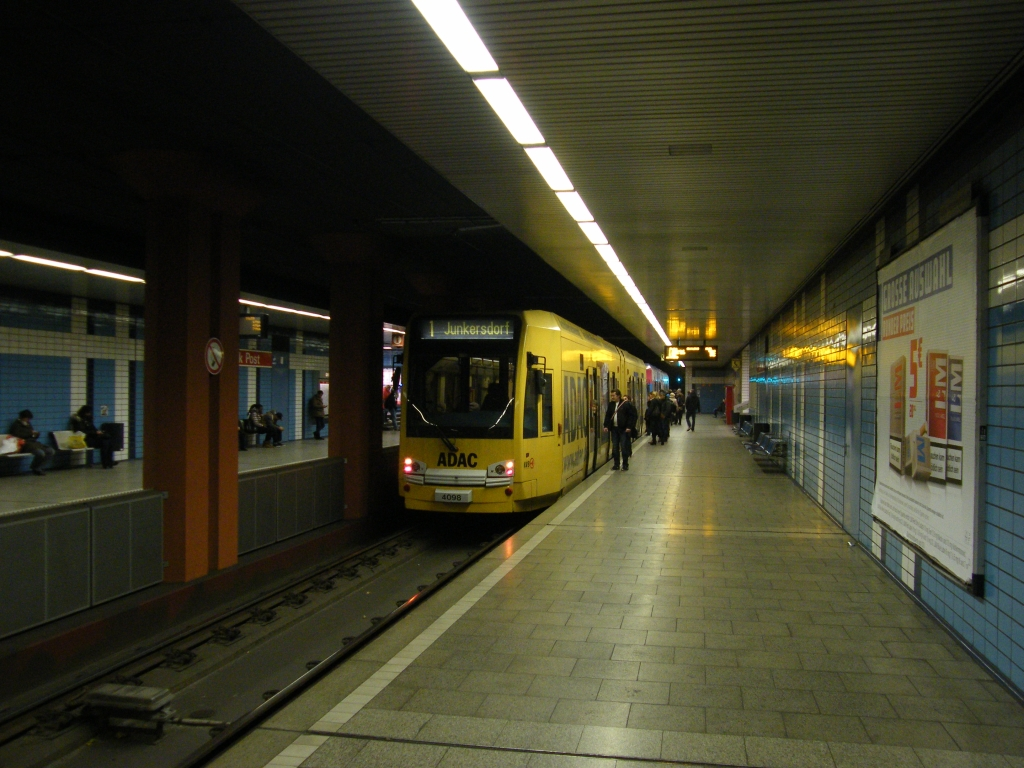
KVB lightrail train in Kalk Post station

Kalk is served by numerous railway stations and highways. Train stations include Köln-Trimbornstraße and numerous light rail stations of Cologne Stadtbahn line 1 and 9. The Bundesautobahn 3 and 4 connect Kalk with the Cologne Beltway.
