= Rath/Heumar =

District of Cologne, Germany

Coordinates: 50°55′17″N 7°04′54″E

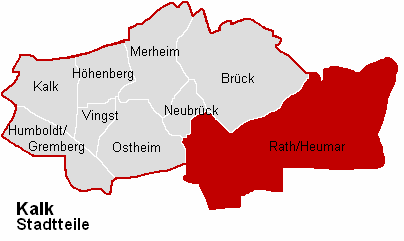
map of Rath/Heumar within Kalk

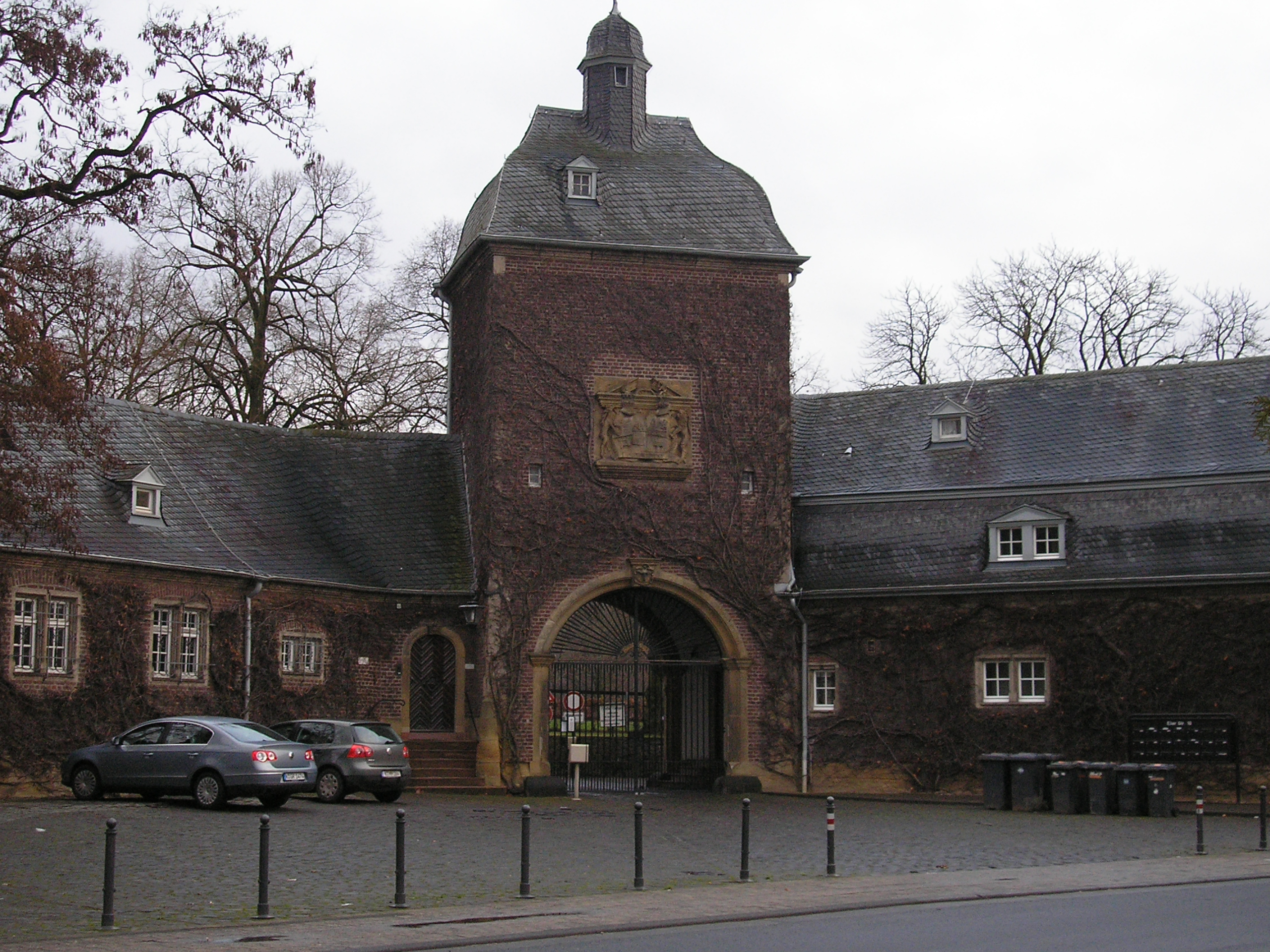
Röttgen estate

Rath/Heumar is a quarter of Cologne, Germany. It is located in the eastern part of the city, in the borough (Stadtbezirk) of Kalk.

Its population on 31 December 2004, was approximately 11,000.

== Location ==
Rath/Heumar lies on the eastern edge of Cologne, bordering on its eastern side the Königsforst recreation park (in German). To the east are the municipalities of Bergisch Gladbach and Rösrath, to the south Cologne-Eil, to the west Cologne-Gremberghoven and Cologne-Ostheim, to the north-west Cologne-Neubrück and to the north Cologne-Brück. Housing density is lower than in more central parts of the town, and many of the residential zones are dominated by detached family houses.

== Transport links ==
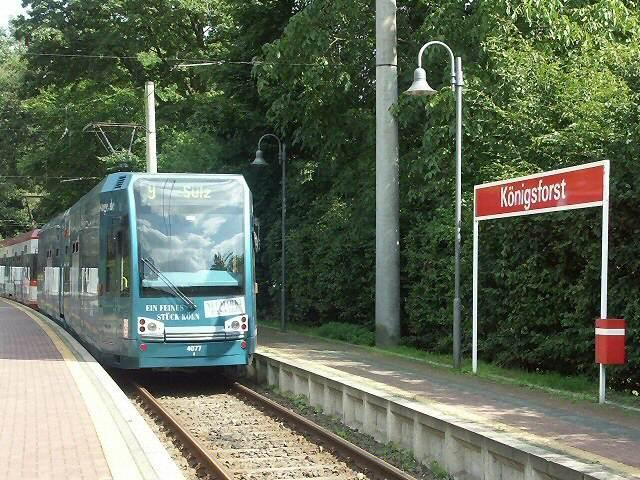
Lightrail train at the final stop in Königsforst

Line 9 of Cologne Stadtbahn is passing through the district, the final stop is Königsforst station, where also a city bus station, Park and Ride (P+R)- and Bike and Ride (B+R) faciality are located.
