= Rodenkirchen =

Rodenkirchen (2)
- Borough of Cologne
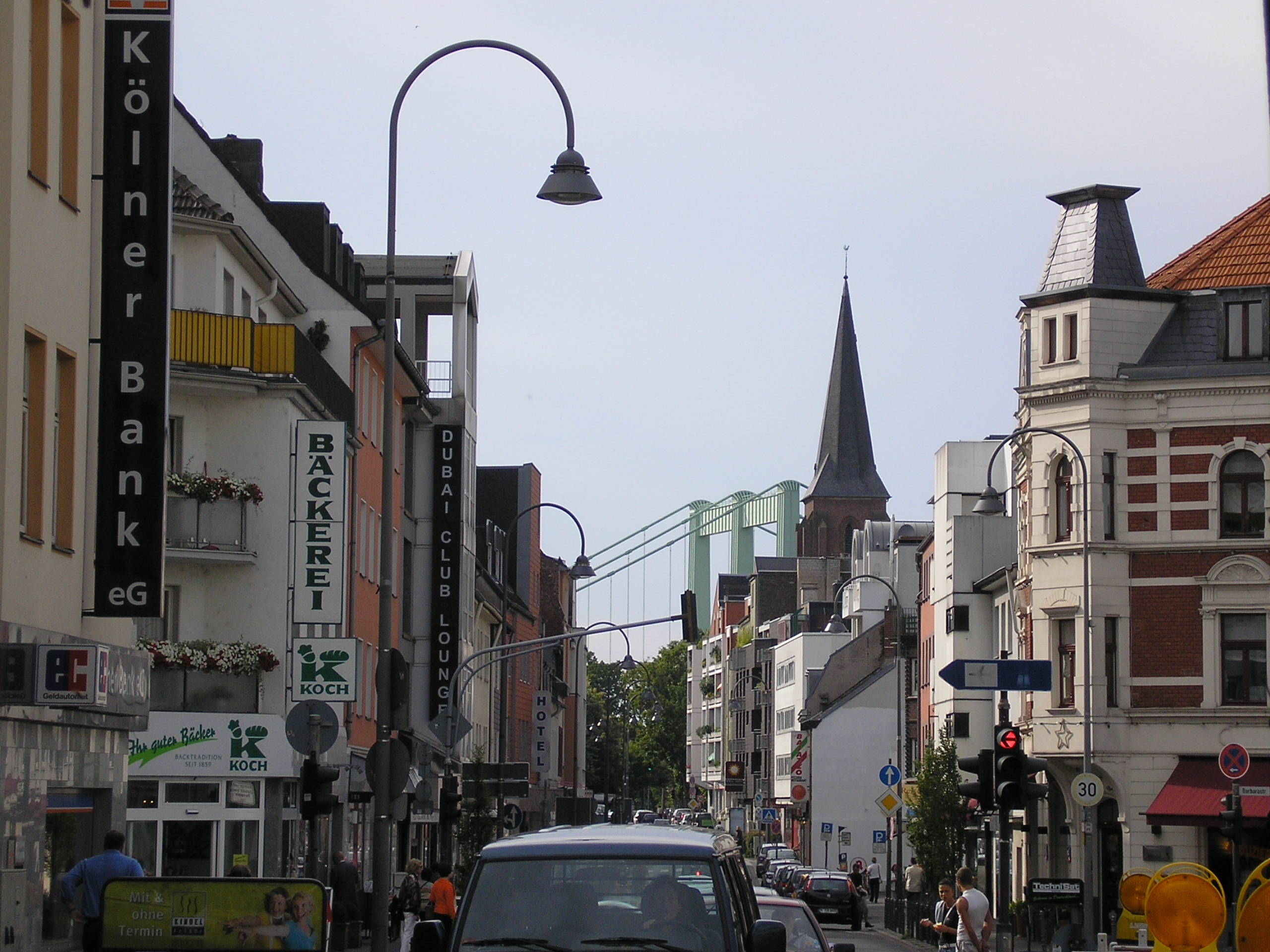
- Hauptstraße with Cologne Rodenkirchen Bridge in the background

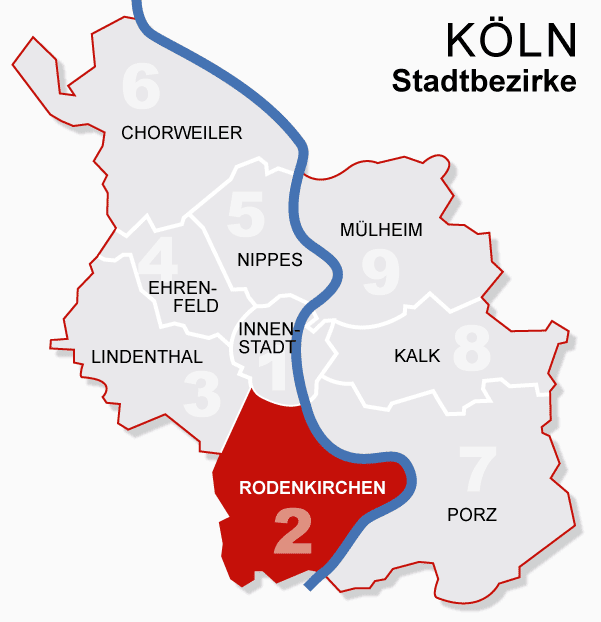
- Location within Cologne
- Interactive map of Rodenkirchen (2)
- Location within Germany Location within North Rhine-Westphalia
- Coordinates: 50°53′29″N 6°59′28″E
- Country: Germany
- State: North Rhine-Westphalia
- Admin. region: Cologne
- District: Urban district
- City: Cologne
- Elevation: 54.55 m (179.0 ft)

Population (2020-12-31)
  - Total: 110,158
- Time zone: UTC+01:00 (CET)
  - Summer (DST): UTC+02:00 (CEST)

Rodenkirchen (German pronunciation: [ʁoːdn̩ˈkɪʁçn̩]) is a southern borough (Stadtbezirk) of Cologne (Köln) in Germany. It has about 110,000 inhabitants and covers an area of 54.55 square kilometres (21.06 square miles). The borough includes the quarters Bayenthal, Godorf, Hahnwald, Immendorf, Marienburg, Meschenich, Raderberg, Raderthal, Rodenkirchen, Sürth, Rondorf, Weiß and Zollstock.

The 1000-year-old quarter Rodenkirchen, situated close to the Rhine, today represents the center of the borough. It has more than 16,000 inhabitants.

== Subdivisions ==
Rodenkirchen is made up of 13 Stadtteile (city parts):

#	City part	Population (2009)	Area (km^{2})	Pop. per km^{2}	map
201	Bayenthal	8,508	1,28	6,647	District map of Rodenkirchen
202	Marienburg	5,497	3,05	1,802	District map of Rodenkirchen
203	Raderberg	5,643	0,84	6,718	District map of Rodenkirchen
204	Raderthal	4,768	3,21	1,485	District map of Rodenkirchen
205	Zollstock	21,049	5,04	4,176	District map of Rodenkirchen
206	Rondorf	9,532	8,20	1,162	District map of Rodenkirchen
207	Hahnwald	2,068	3,00	687	District map of Rodenkirchen
208	Rodenkirchen	15,764	7,83	2,014	District map of Rodenkirchen
209	Weiß	5,754	4,16	1,383	District map of Rodenkirchen
210	Sürth	10,348	3,46	2,993	District map of Rodenkirchen
211	Godorf	2,245	4,60	488	District map of Rodenkirchen
212	Immendorf	2,010	5,23	385	District map of Rodenkirchen
213	Meschenich	7,648	4,72	1,621	District map of Rodenkirchen
source: Die Kölner Stadtteile in Zahlen 2010 (in German)

== Points of interest ==
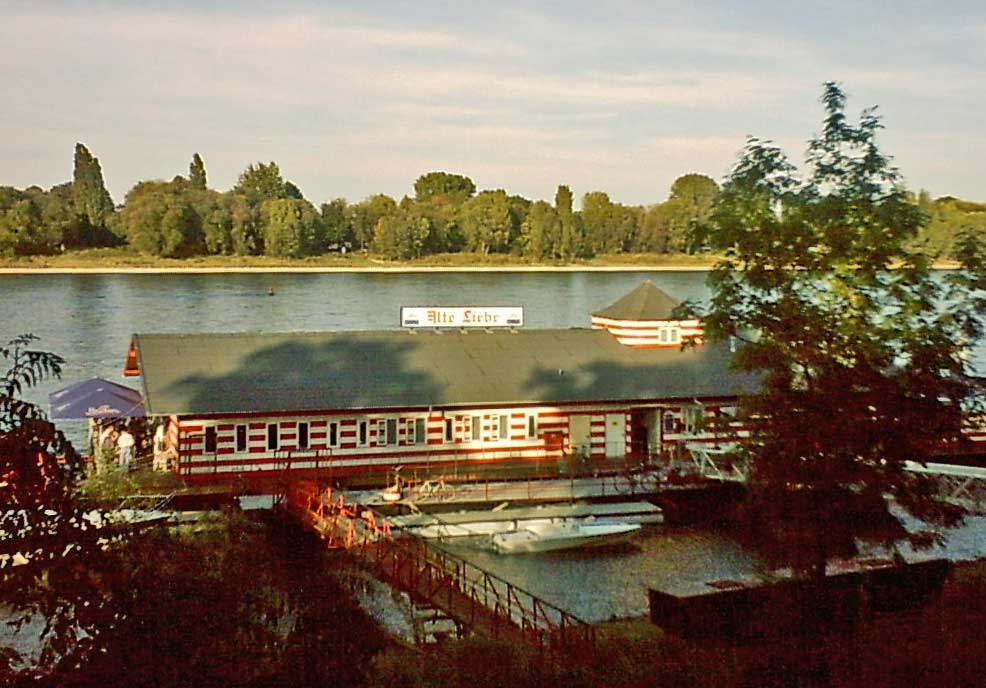
Gastronomical ship "Alte Liebe"

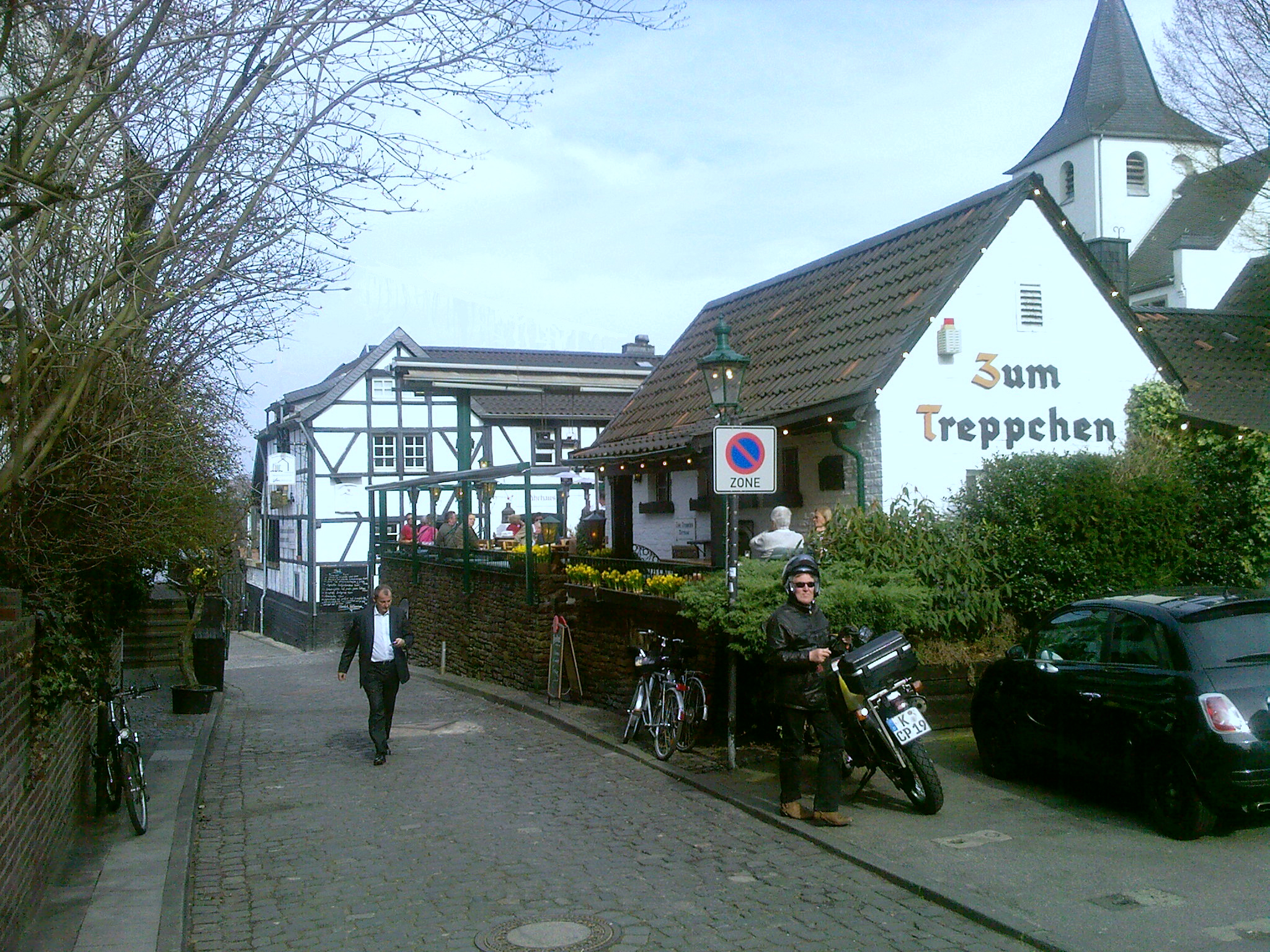
Classic restaurant "Zum Treppchen"

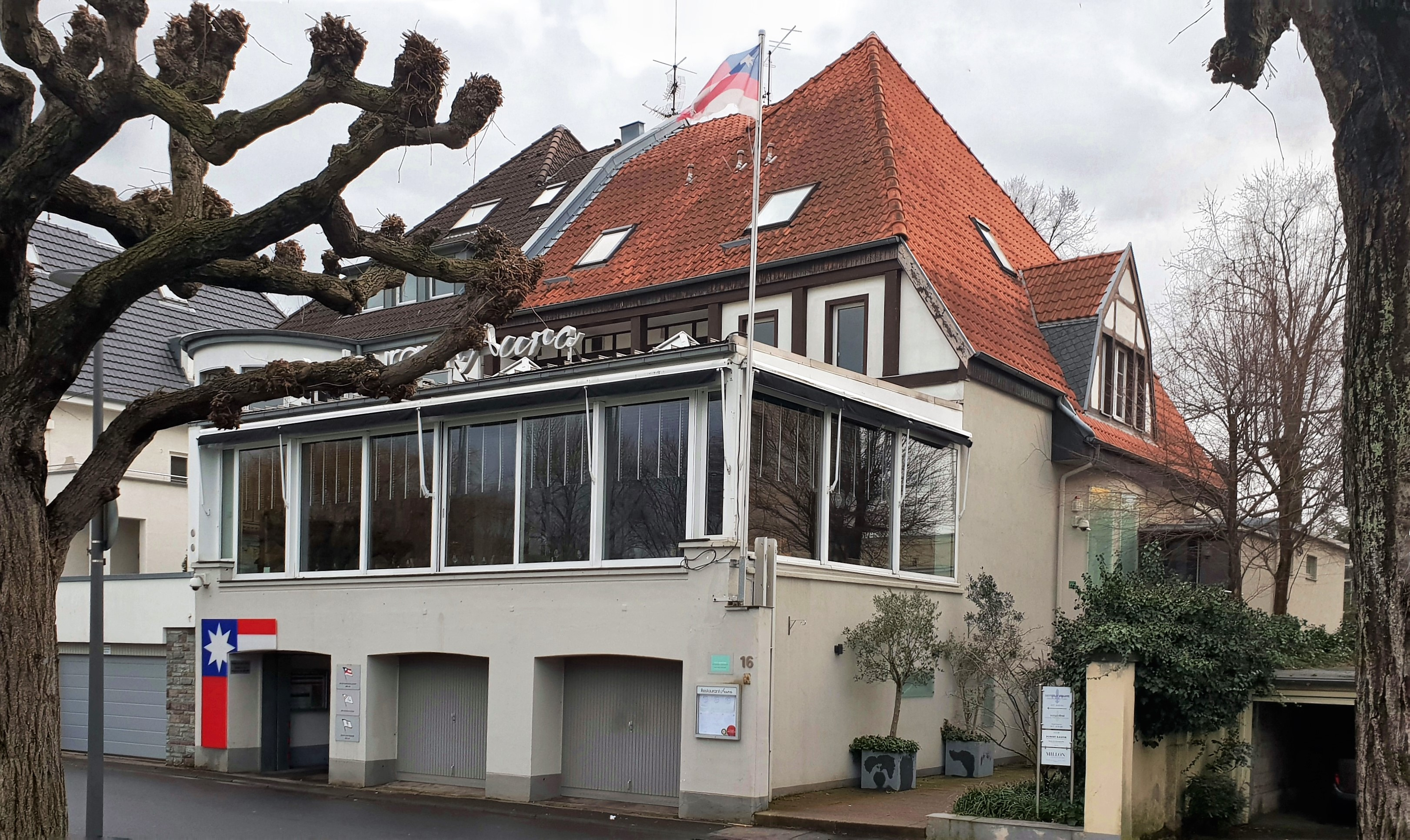
Boathouse of the local rowing club

- Cologne Rodenkirchen Bridge
- Maternus-Shrine
- Villa Malta
- Alt St. Maternus
- Forstbotanischer Garten Köln, an arboretum and woodland botanical garden

=== St. Maternus ===
St. Maternus was built according to the plans of Vinvenz Statz from 1863 to 1867 at the former place of the Carthusian.

St. Maternus was built as a gothic church with only a few ornamentations. It has a tympanum with St. Maternus standing between two angels in front of a panorama of Cologne. Inside the church there is a madonna from Alt St. Maternus (English: Old St. Maternus), the former St. Maternus from 1470.

=== Restaurant-ship "Alte Liebe" ===
The ship named "Alte Liebe" (English: Old Love) is a landmark well-known beyond the town of Rodenkirchen. Originally constructed in 1947, it burned down and was restored three times. Today it is used as a restaurant and for events such as weddings.

== Transport ==
Gustav-Heinemann-Ufer connects Rodenkirchen with the Cologne Ring, Bundesautobahn 555 connects Rodenkirchen with the Cologne Beltway.

=== Rhine bridges ===
- Südbrücke
- A 4 Rodenkirchener Autobahnbrücke

=== Public transport ===
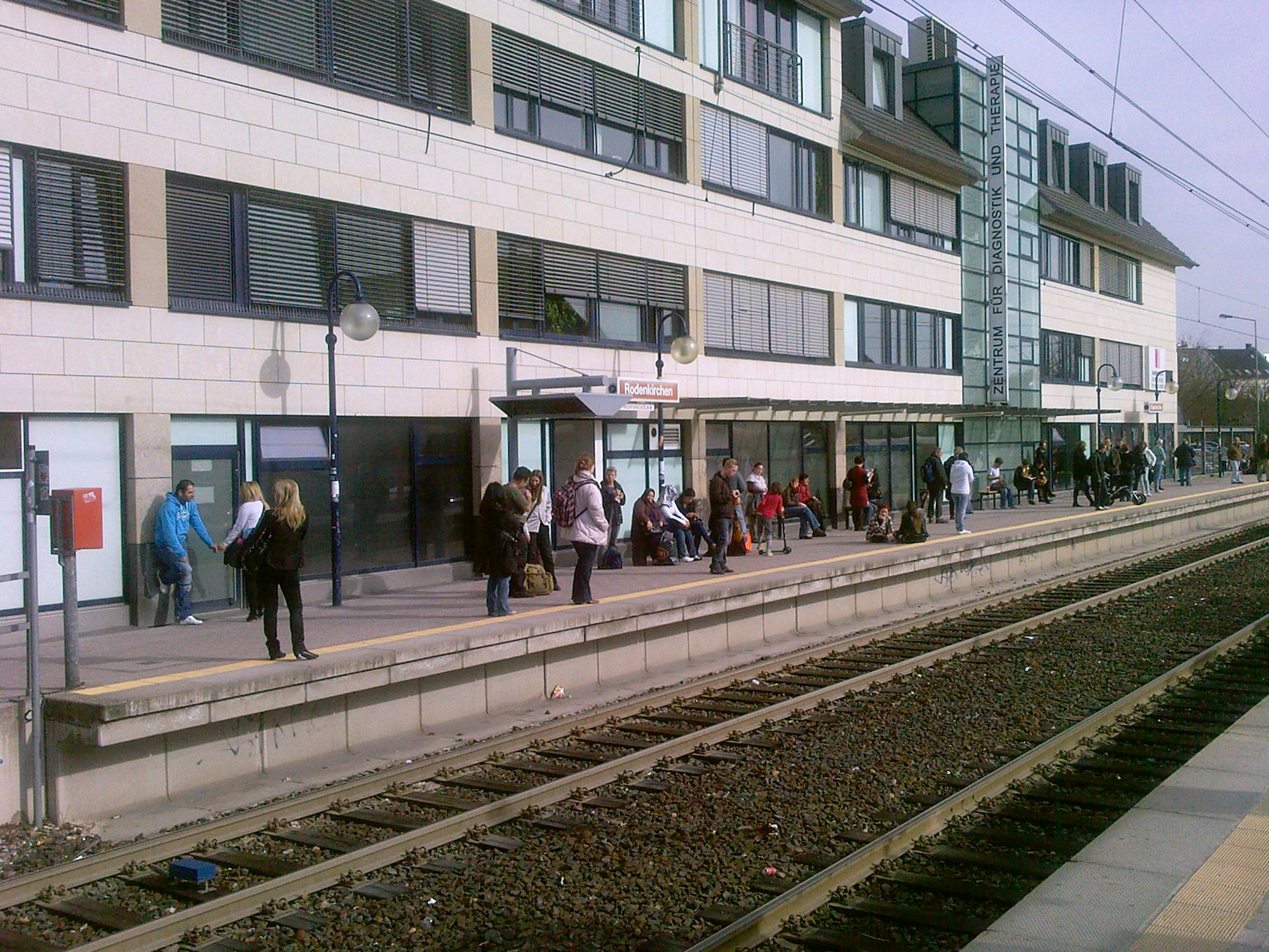
The Rodenkirchen stadtbahn station in 2010

Rodenkirchen is served by the Cologne Stadtbahn at Rodenkirchen, connected to the city centres of Cologne and Bonn by lines 16 and 17.

== Twin towns – sister cities ==
Rodenkirchen is "twinned" with the following cities:

- Benfleet, United Kingdom
- Eygelshoven, The Netherlands
