= Transport in Cologne =

This article covers transportation in and around the city of Cologne, Germany.

== Road transport ==
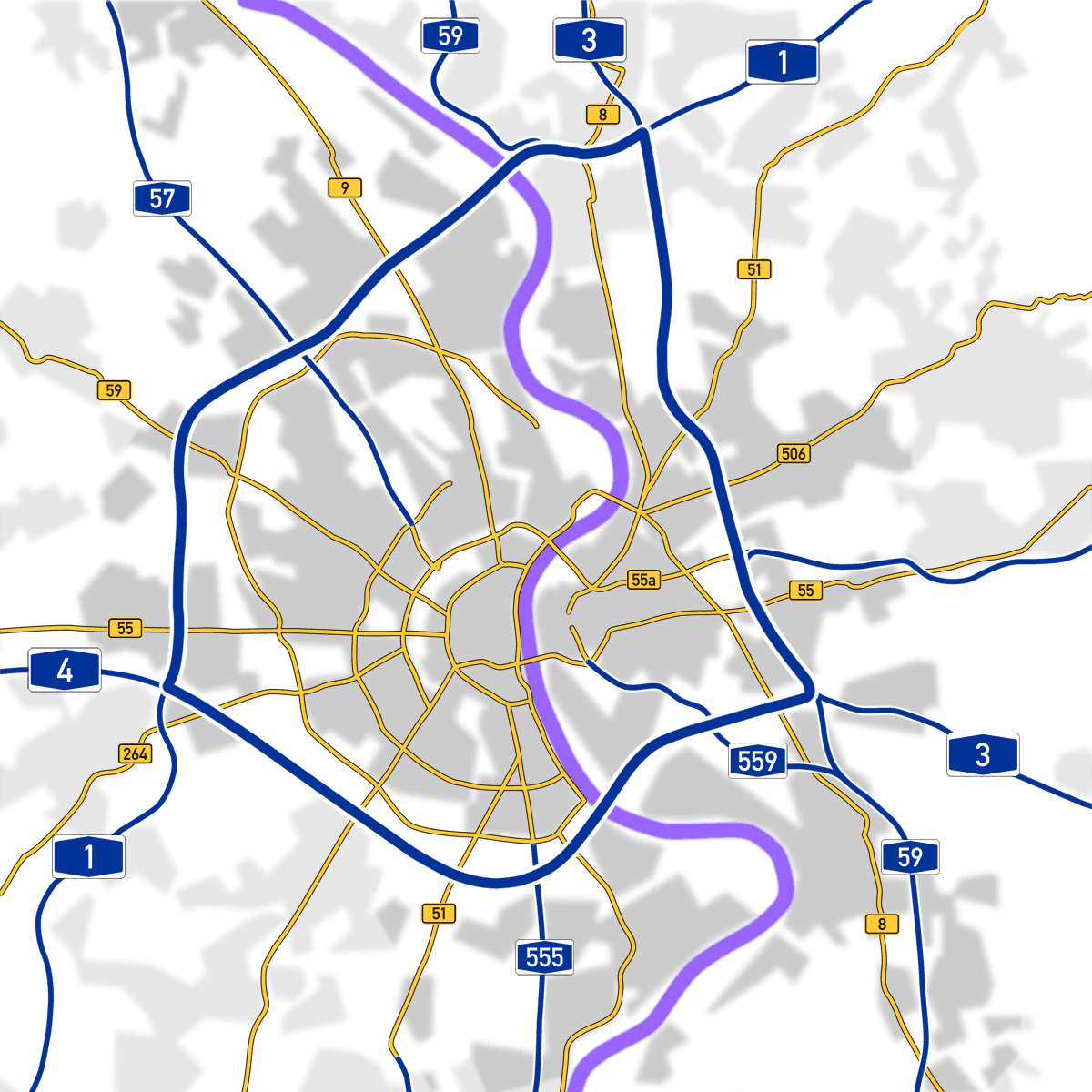
Cologne Beltway (blue) and principal roads through and around Cologne

=== Ring roads ===
The city of Cologne possesses one of the most comprehensive urban ring road systems. The beltways were laid out during the end of the 19th and in the early 20th centuries and today are still being complemented and extended. Their development originated in the work of architects and urban designers such as Karl Henrici, Josef Stübben and Fritz Schumacher as well as former Cologne mayors Hermann Heinrich Becker and Konrad Adenauer. They include the Cologne Ring, Innere Kanalstraße, the Cologne Belt, Militärringstraße and the Cologne Beltway.

=== Arterial roads ===
Arterial roads east of the Rhine all start in Deutz. Deutz is a neighborhood in Innenstadt. They include Pfälzischer, Bergischer and Clevischer Ring (extending into Düsseldorfer Straße), Stadtautobahn (extending into BAB 4) and Deutz-Kalker-Straße (extending into Kalker Hauptstraße and Olpener Straße).

Arterial roads west of the Rhine mostly start at the Cologne Inner Ring. They include Bonner Straße (extending into BAB 555), Vorgebirgstraße, Luxemburger Straße, Dürener Straße, Aachener Straße, Venloer Straße and Neusser Straße (extending into Neusser Landstraße).

=== Highways ===
Freeway construction became a major issue in Cologne starting in the 1920s under the leadership of Mayor Konrad Adenauer. The first German limited access highway (autobahn) was opened in 1932 between Cologne and Bonn. Today, this is A 555. In 1965 Cologne became the first German city to be fully encircled by a beltway. Shortly after the Second World War reconstruction plans by, among others, Rudolf Schwarz called for a downtown bypass freeway (the "Stadtautobahn" (in German)) as a centerpiece of rebuilding the city. These schemes were only partially executed though, due to opposition by environmental groups. The completed section became Bundesstraße (Federal Road) B 55a which begins at the Zoobrücke (Zoo Bridge) and meets with A 4 and A 3 autobahns at the Cologne East interchange. Nevertheless, it is referred to as Stadtautobahn by most locals. However another project anticipated even before the war by planner and architect Fritz Schumacher in the 1920s has fared better. The Nord-Süd-Fahrt (North-South-Drive), a four/six lane downtown expressway, was completed in 1972.

In 2005 the first stretch of A 3 between the Cologne East and Heumar interchanges, which forms part of the eastern section of the beltway, was widened to 8 lanes. Work continues on widening the remaining portions of the A 3 between the Cologne East and Leverkusen interchanges. Meanwhile, in context with the pending replacement of the Rhine bridge at Leverkusen, the state highway administration favors widening the adjacent sections of the Cologne Beltway to 10 and - in a small section south of the interchange Leverkusen - even 12 lanes.

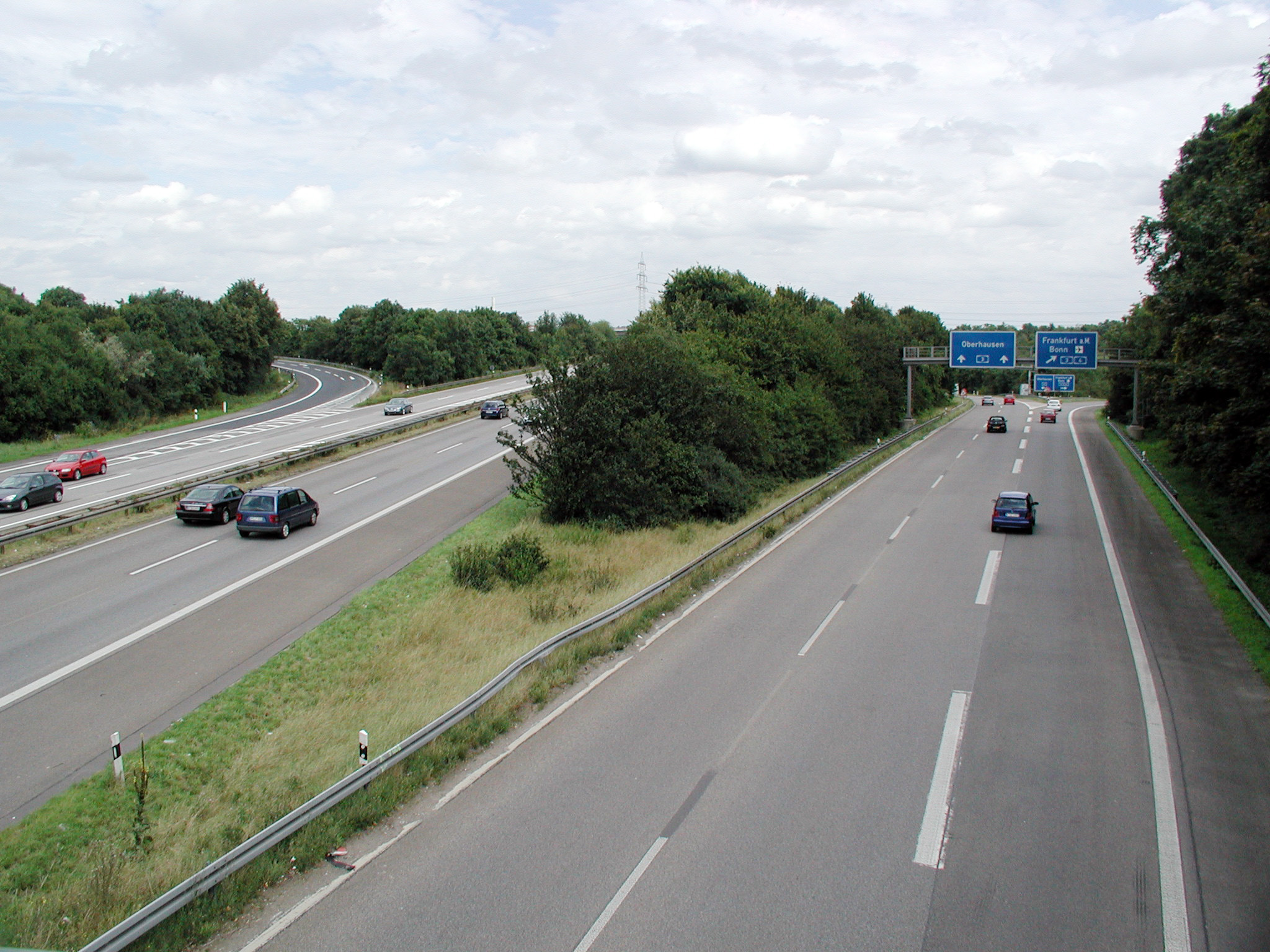
4-way interchange Köln-Ost at Stadtautobahn and A3

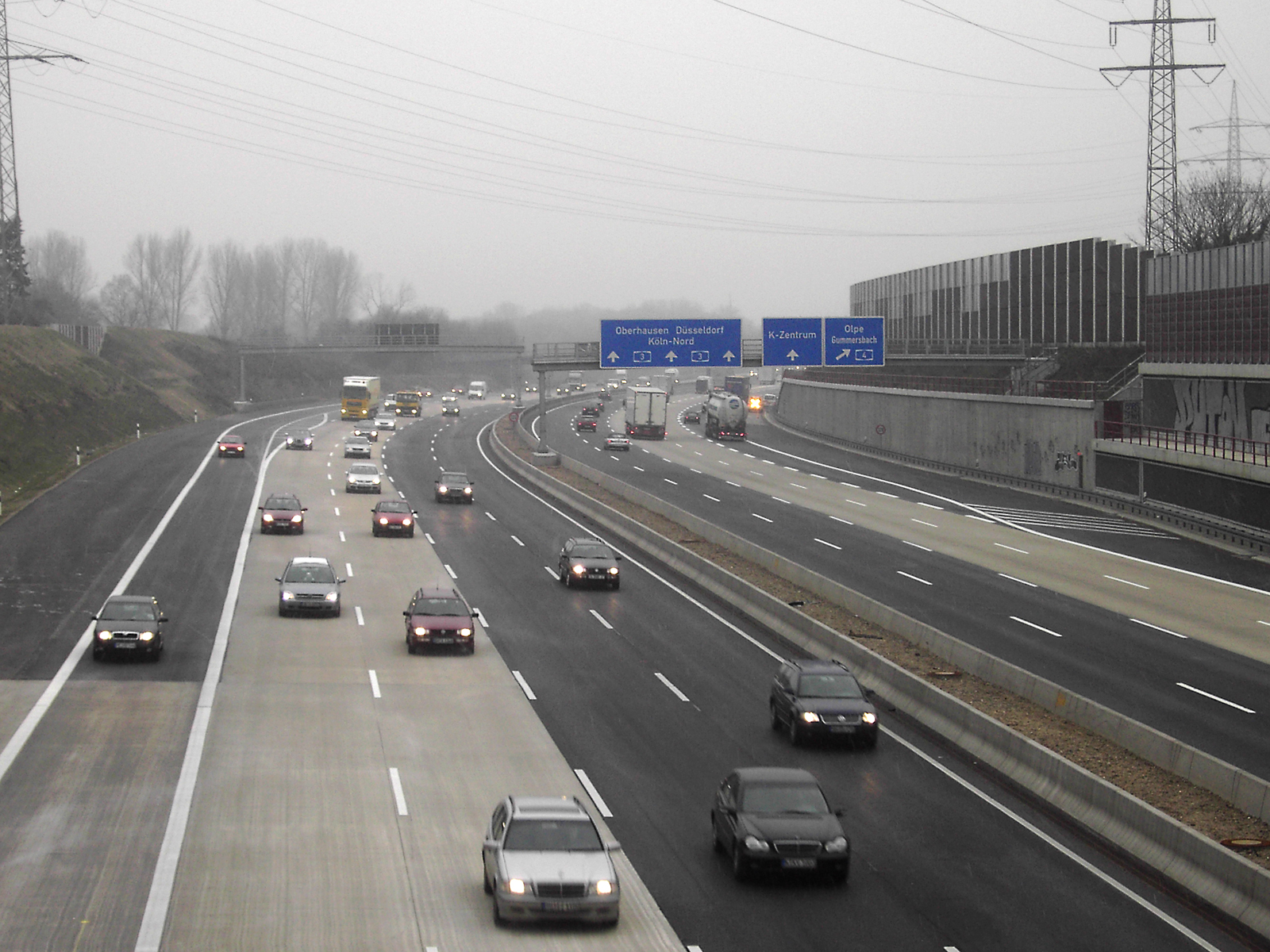
4-lane section of the Cologne Beltway at A3, with noise barrier on the right and two noise-reducing truck-lanes on each side

== Rail transport ==
Tram and U-Bahn rail network of Cologne Stadtbahn

=== Mass transit ===
Cologne has Deutsche Bahn Service with InterCity and ICE-trains stopping at Köln Hauptbahnhof (Cologne Central Station), Köln Messe/Deutz and Flughafen Köln/Bonn. The first railway was opened in 1839 by the defunct Rheinische Eisenbahngesellschaft (Rhenanian Railway Company) on the line from Cologne via Aachen to Belgium, today's Cologne–Aachen high-speed railway. A Central Station was erected in 1859 to connect the lines of five different railway companies, which mostly had different stations before.
Cologne also has a Eurostar train service to connect to cities in different countries such as Amsterdam, Brussels, and Paris.

=== Light rail and rapid transit ===
The Cologne Stadtbahn operates an extensive light rail and rapid transit system (partially underground) serving Cologne and some neighboring cities. Its name derives from the German term for light rail, Stadtbahn. It is operated by the Kölner Verkehrs-Betriebe (KVB) (Cologne Transit Company) and is part of the Rhine-Sieg Transit Association. The rail system stretches across 192 kilometers with 11 lines. Two lines (16 and 18) link the system to the neighboring transport system of Bonn. The Cologne Stadtbahn is not a true subway system, even though a large part of the system operates underground, especially in the downtown area. Instead it is a rapid tram system, each line crosses at least one street at street level without absolute right of way.

The Cologne Stadtbahn traces its beginnings to the year 1877, when the first horse-drawn tram line was opened. The first stretch of an underground route network was completed in 1968. Underground construction in the downtown Cologne area is often obstructed by the fact that archeologists in Cologne, one of Germany's oldest cities, have legal rights to dig in all future building sites within the medieval city limits before all heavy construction machinery. Currently the average cruising speed is 26.6 kilometers per hour (2006).

The Rhine-Ruhr S-Bahn has 5 lines which cross Cologne. The S13/S19 runs 24/7 between Cologne Hbf and Cologne/Bonn Flaughafen.

Köln Hbf (Central train station)

ICE at Köln Messe/Deutz station

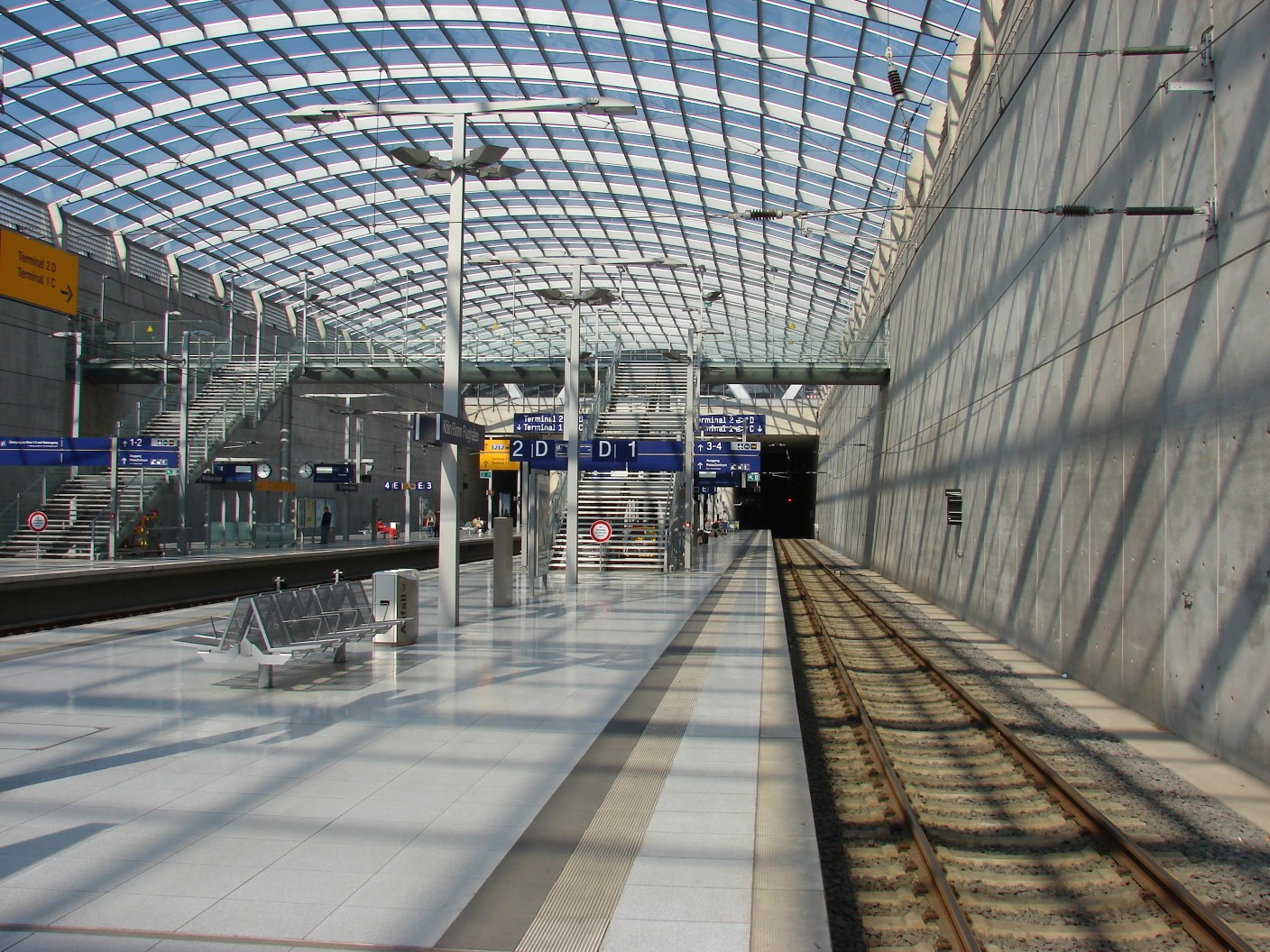
Cologne/Bonn Airport station

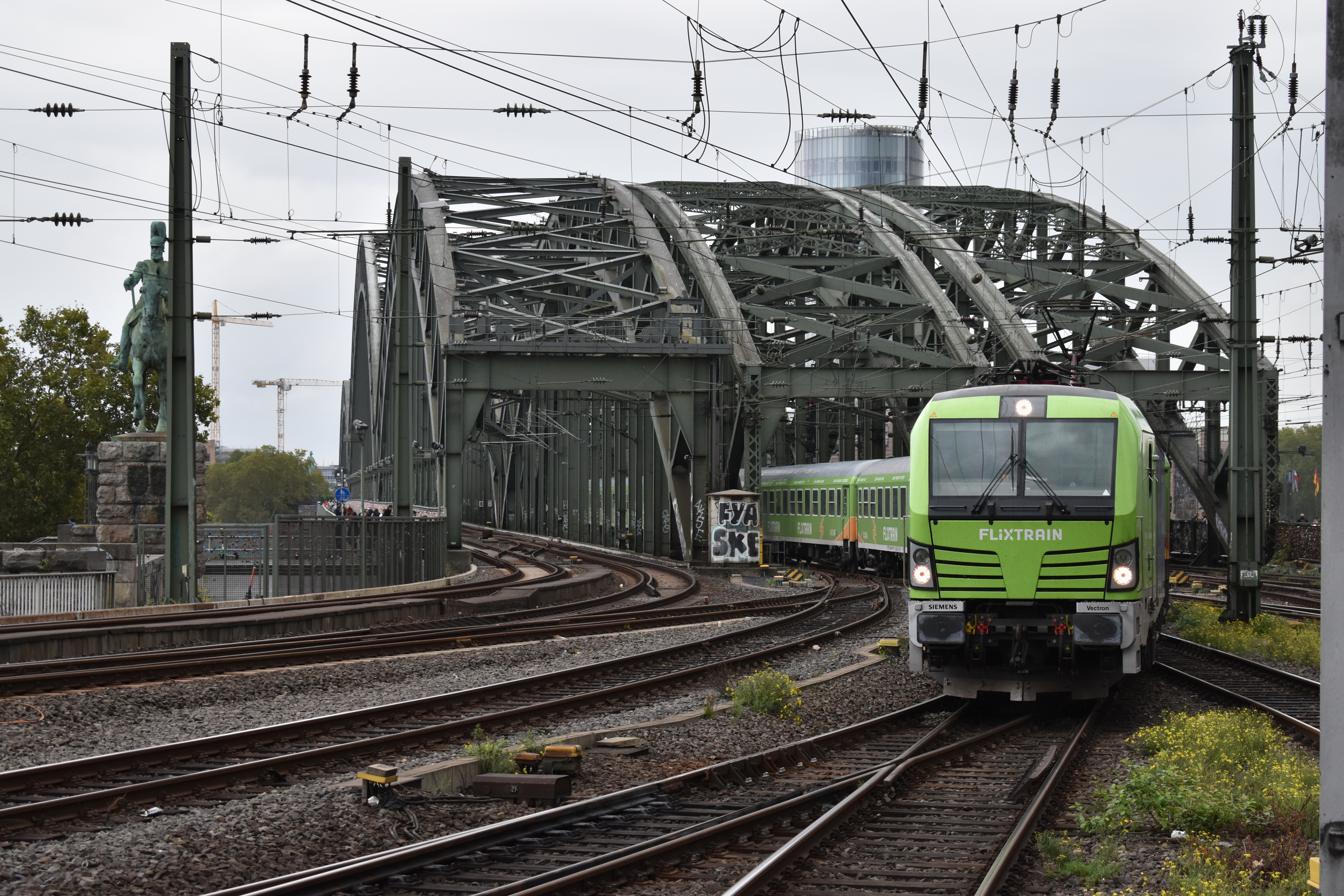
Flixtrain passing Hohenzollern Bridge

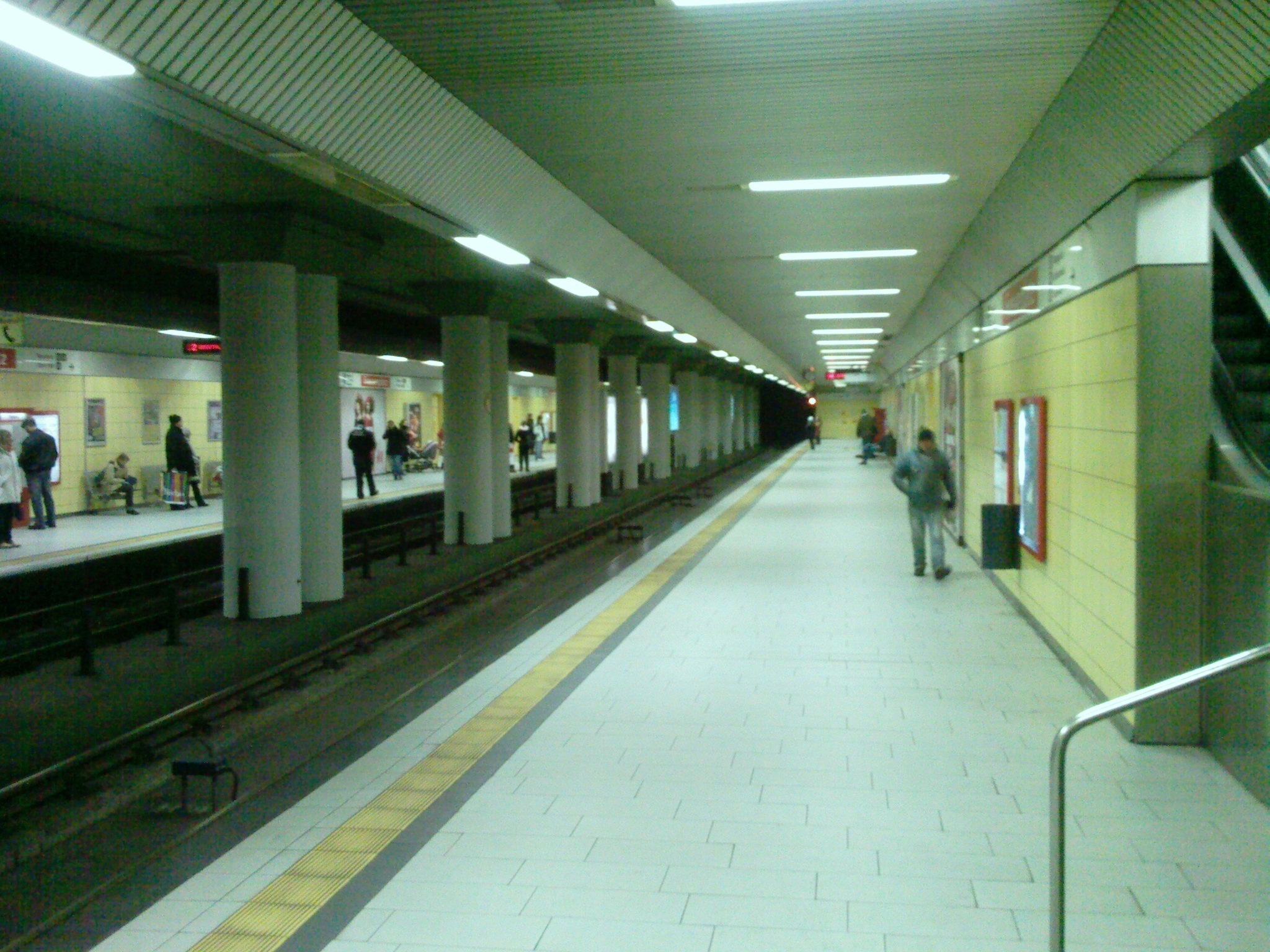
Friesenplatz U-Bahn station

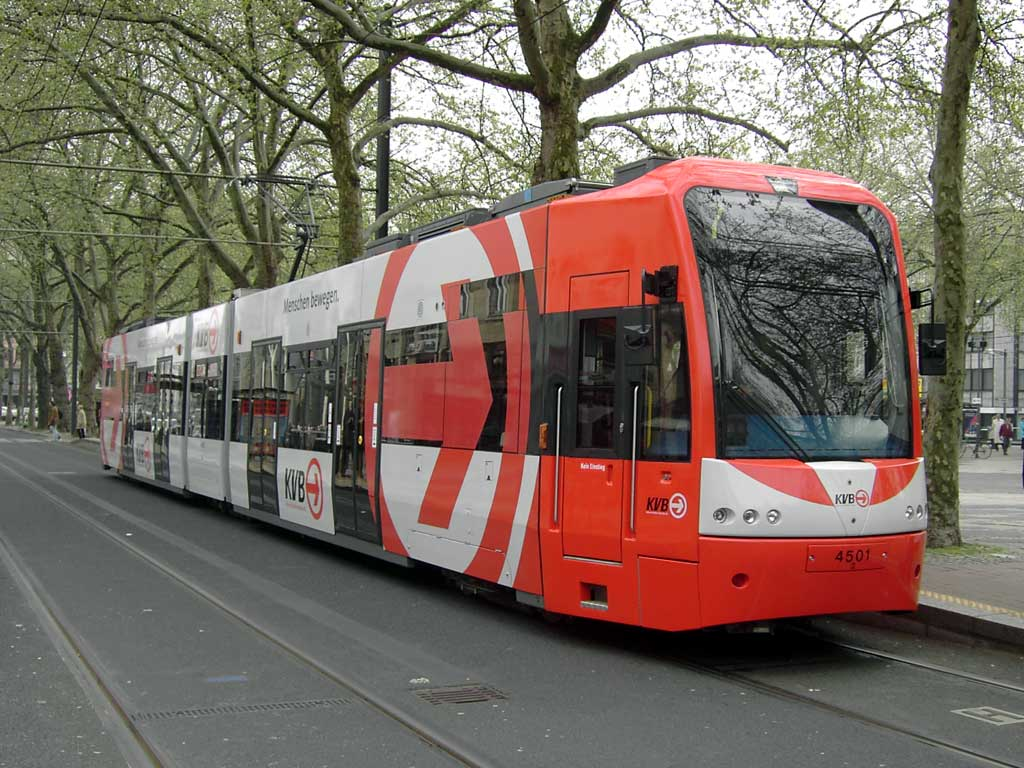
Low-floor train K4500 by Bombardier at Neumarkt tram station

== Water transport ==
Cologne Ports (HGK) is one of the largest operators for inland ports in Germany. Ports include Deutz, Godorf, Mülheim and Niehl I and II.

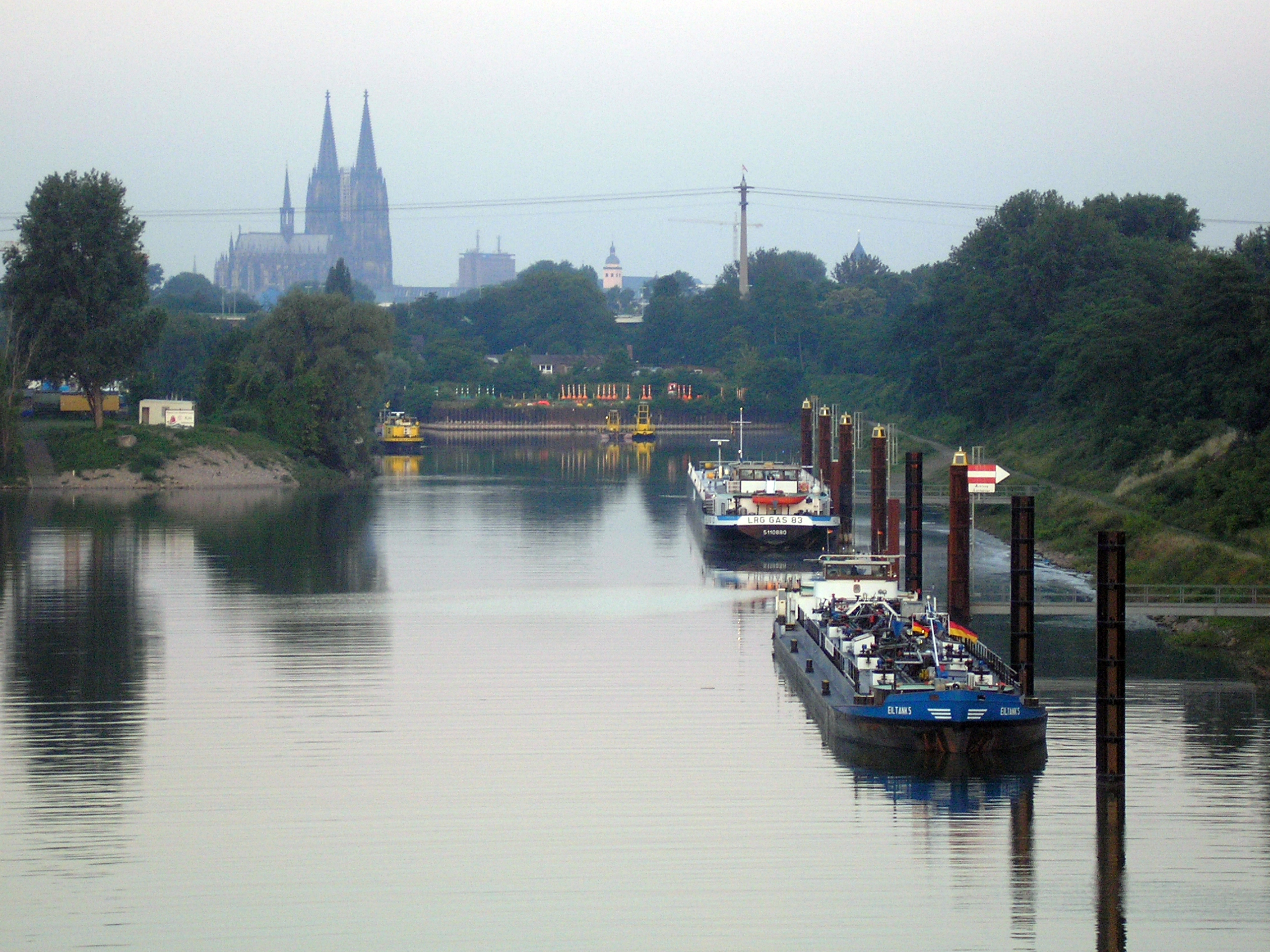
Mülheim, Cologne port

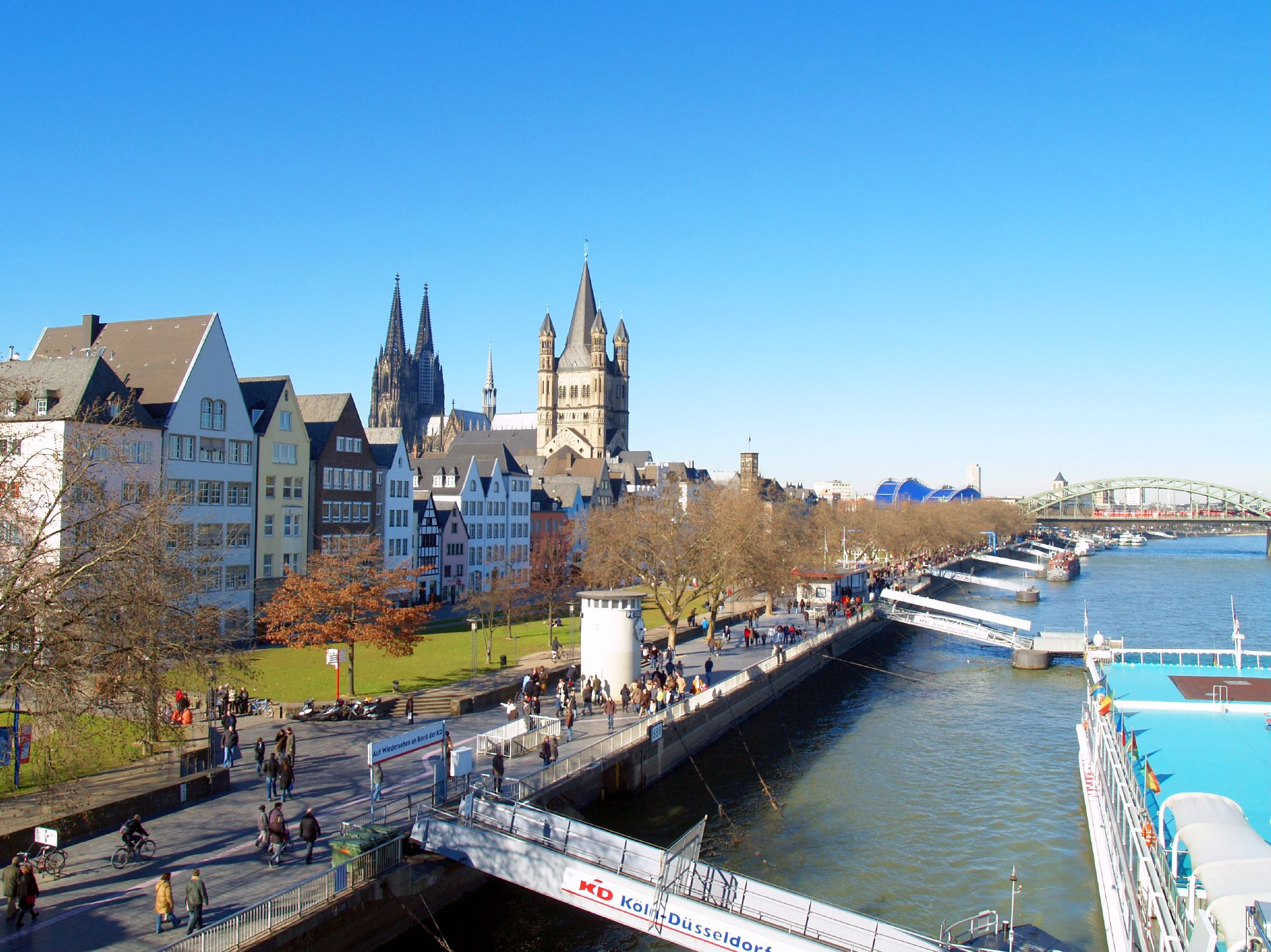
River cruise ships of Köln-Düsseldorfer

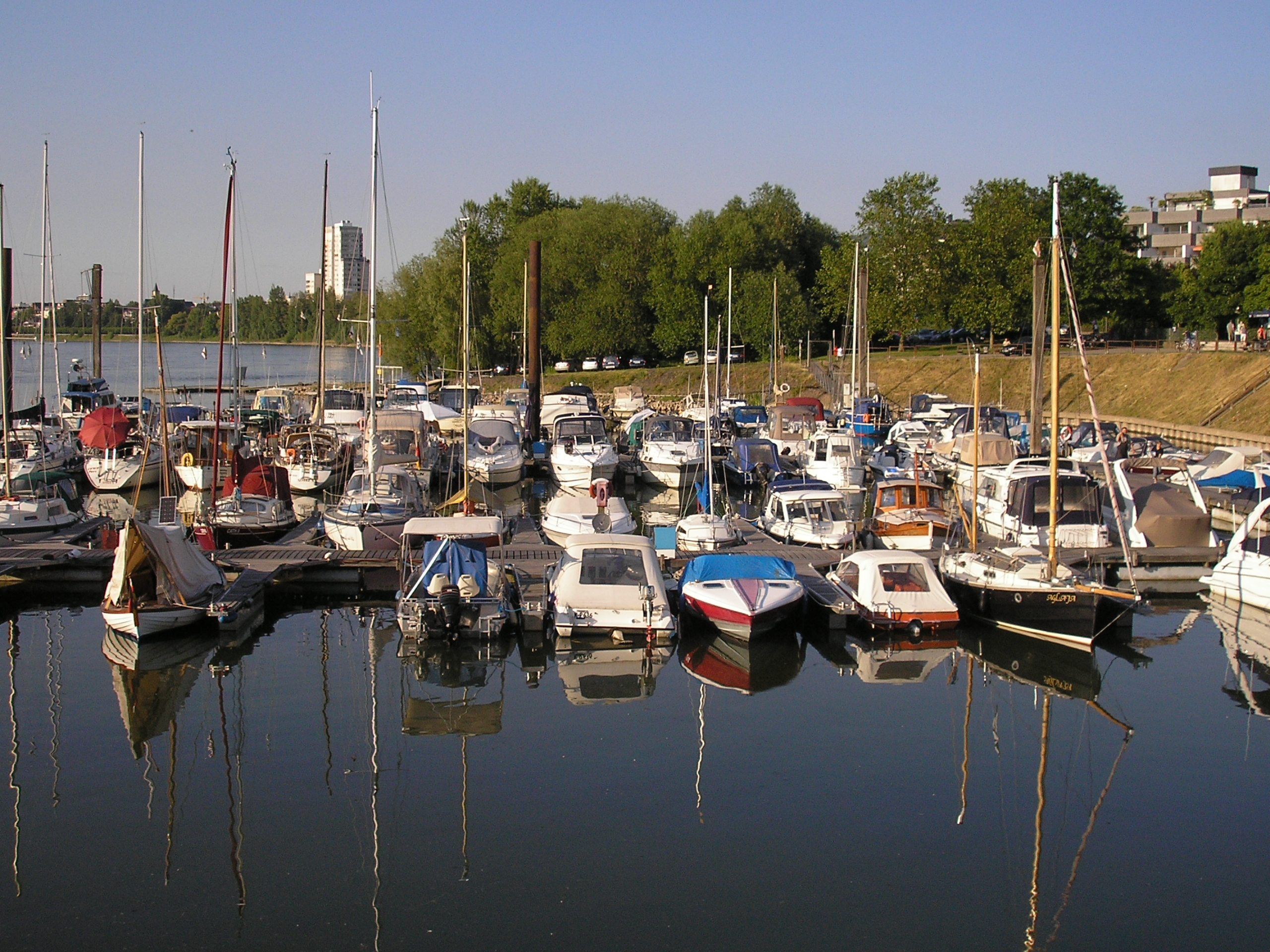
Marina at Zündorf

== Air transport ==
CGN, DUS and other commercial airports in North Rhine-Westphalia

The name of Cologne's international Airport (IATA: CGN, ICAO: EDDK) is Konrad-Adenauer-Flughafen. It is shared with the neighbouring city of Bonn (Cologne/Bonn Region). It's the sixth largest airport in Germany while in terms of cargo flights it is No. 2. In 2007 the number of passengers climbed to about 10.5 million. The current Airport was opened to civilian traffic in 1951 by the British armed forces, which used the former airport in Cologne Ossendorf increasingly for their own military purposes. A completely new terminal was built in 1970, supplementing the hitherto makeshift buildings. This building was adjoined by an extension in 2000, called Terminal 2, which has been planned by German-American architect Helmut Jahn. Terminal 1, which the building from 1970 is called since then, had already acquired preservation status for its easily recognizable brutalist concrete architecture.

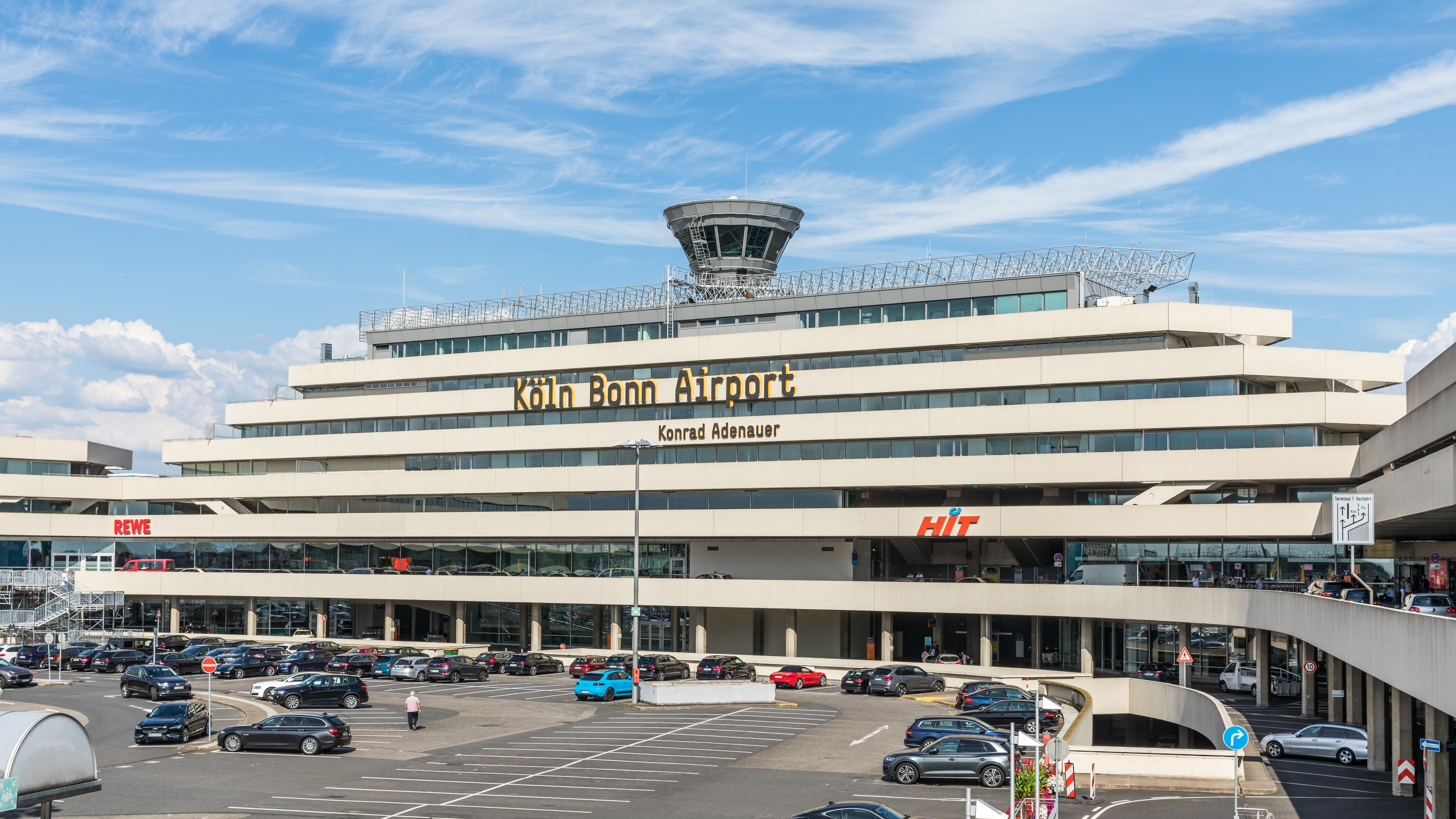
Terminal 1, Cologne/Bonn Airport

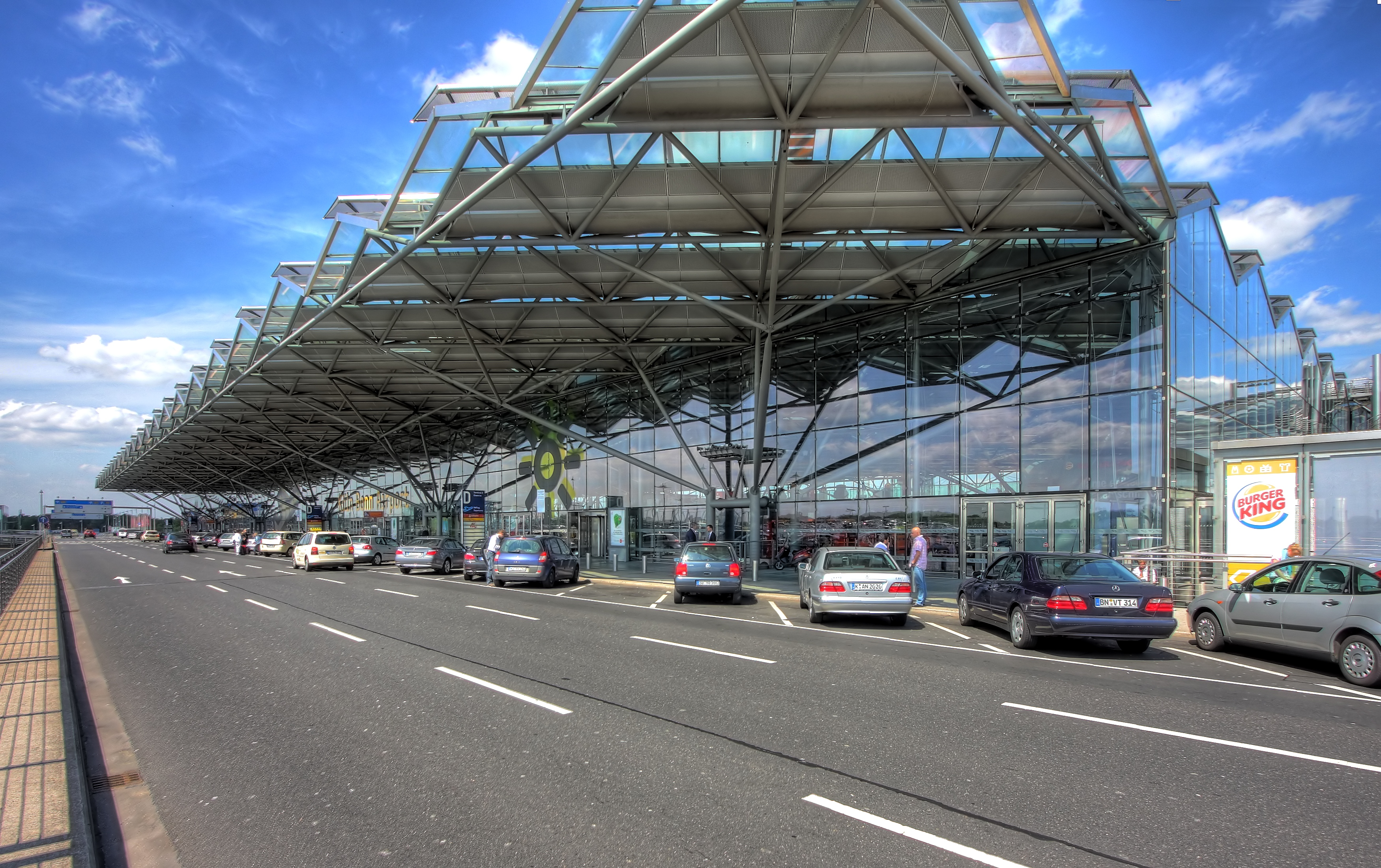
Terminal 2, Cologne/Bonn Airport

== See also ==
- Transport in Germany
- List of streets in Cologne
