= Cologne Beltway =

Motorway ring road in Germany

Cologne Beltway
- Bundesautobahn 1, 3, 4

Route information
- Length: 50 km (31 mi)

Major junctions
- Ring road around Cologne

A3/E35 East Ring
- Length: 14 km (8.7 mi)
- Major intersections: A 1 / E37; Willy-Brandt-Ring; Mülheimer Zubringer; Bergisch Gladbacher Str. A 4 / E40; A 59

A4/E40 South Ring
- Length: 22 km (14 mi)
- Major intersections: A 3 / E35; A 559; Cologne Street; A 555; Am Eifeltor; B 265; A 1 / E31

A1/E31/E37 Northwest Ring
- Length: 18 km (11 mi)
- Major intersections: A 4 / E40; Aachener Str. Venloer Str. A 57 / E31; Industriestraße; A 59; A 3 / E35

Location
- Country: Germany
- States: North Rhine-Westphalia

Highway system
- Roads in Germany; Autobahns; List; Federal; List; State; E-roads

The Cologne Beltway (German:Kölner Autobahnring) is the collective term for the Autobahns encircling Cologne. It consists of the Bundesautobahn 1, the Bundesautobahn 3 and the Bundesautobahn 4. Segments of the beltway handle the highest traffic volume in Germany.

The Autobahns on the beltway cross Bundesautobahn 559, Bundesautobahn 555 and Bundesautobahn 57. The Bundesautobahn 59 is tied to the beltway at the interchange Leverkusen-West in the north and to Dreieck Heumar in the south.

== History ==
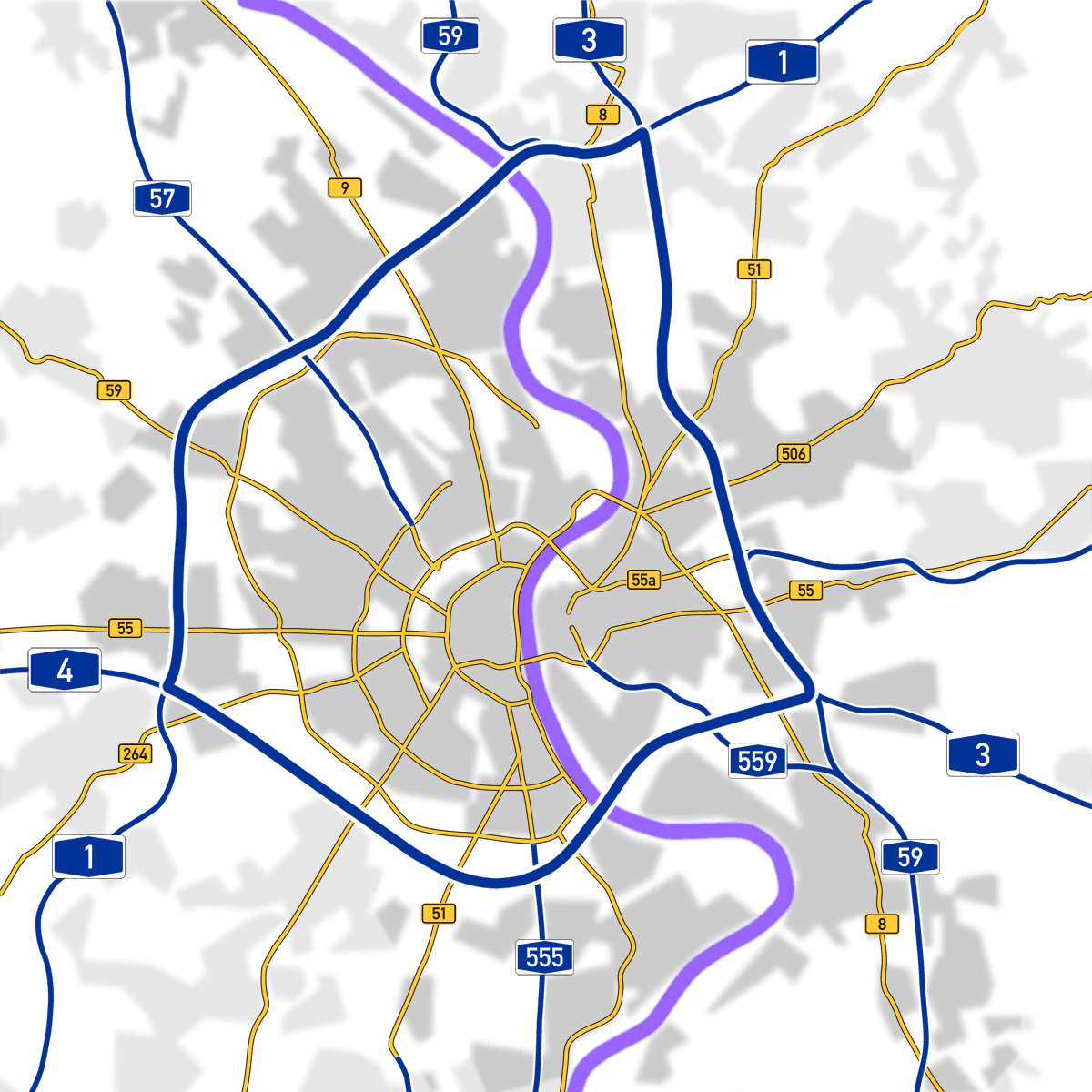
Autobahns of the Cologne Beltway (shown in blue)

The beltway was constructed in a clockwise fashion beginning at Leverkusen. In 1936 the section between Leverkusen and Cologne-Mülheim was built as a component of the Autobahn Oberhausen-Wiesbaden and in 1937 the section to Siegburg was finished. Thus today's Ostring (East-Ring) was drivable at that time. In 1941, the Rodenkirchener Autobahnbrücke was completed and the connection between the A 3 and the Autobahn to Bonn (today A 555) was established.

From 1957 to 1960 the Autobahn Cologne-Aachen was finished and the section from Kreuz Köln-Süd to the later Kreuz Köln-West was put into service in 1958. Construction of a second Autobahn-bridge across the Rhine in the north of Cologne began in 1961. At its completion, the beltway could be used along its entire length.

In 1971, the A 1 was extended to the south beyond the Köln-West interchange and in 1974 the A 4 was connected to the A 3 from the east at the Köln-Ost interchange. Since then, the section between interchanges Kreuz Köln-Ost and Dreieck Heumar consists of two Autobahns, the A 3 and the A 4.

== Current state ==
Traffic volume on the Cologne Beltway has been increasing continuously since the 1950s. All sections have since been expanded to three lanes in each direction, but since more than 180,000 cars use at least part of the Autobahnring every day, traffic jams are a frequent occurrence. The section between the interchanges Kreuz Köln-Ost and Dreieck Heumar was expanded to four lanes in each direction in 2005, a first for North Rhine-Westphalia. In 2008 the section with four lanes in each direction has been extended to the interchange Köln-Dellbrück. Currently widening work is going on between Köln-Dellbrück and Köln-Mülheim. It was scheduled to be complete in autumn 2012. The A1 has mostly a speed limit of 100 km/h. It has recently been raised to 120 km/h northbound between Köln-Lövenich and Köln-Bocklemünd as well as between Kreuz Köln-Nord and Köln-Niehl. On the A4 the speed limit is 120 km/h. On the A3 there is a variable speed limit up to a maximum of 120 km/h.

In preparation for the 2006 FIFA World Cup the A 3 was outfitted with a traffic management system which is able to route traffic around congestion and construction sites.

== "Second Beltway" ==
In the 1970s, a second beltway around Cologne was considered, incorporating existing Autobahns, instead of expanding the first one to more lanes. An expansion of the old beltway was considered as too expensive because of the large number of bridges. It was planned to incorporate some of Cologne's other Autobahns into this second Autobahnring. These plans were however never implemented.

== Junction lists ==
The entire route is located around Cologne, North Rhine-Westphalia.

Ring	Km	Exit	Name	Destinations	Notes
Through to A 3 / E35
East Ring		23	Leverkusen	A 1 / E37	4-way interchange
East Ring		24	Leverkusen	Willy-Brandt-Ring	
East Ring		25	Köln-Mülheim	Mülheimer Zubringer	
East Ring		26	Köln-Mülheim	Bergisch Gladbacher Str.	
East Ring		27/16	Köln-Ost	A 4 / E40	4-way interchange
East Ring		28/15	Heumar	A 4 / E40; A 59	3-way interchange
South Ring		14	Gremberg	A 559	4-way interchange
South Ring		13	Köln-Poll	Cologne Street	
South Ring		BR	Rodenkirchener Brücke		
South Ring		12	Köln-Süd	A 555	
South Ring		11a	Köln-Eifeltor	Am Eifeltor	
South Ring		11	Köln-Klettenberg	B 265	
South Ring		10/104	Köln-West	A 1 / E31	4-way interchange
Northwest Ring		103	Köln-Lövenich	Aachener Str.	
Northwest Ring		102	Köln-Bocklemünd	Venloer Str.	
Northwest Ring		101	Köln-Nord	A 57 / E31	
Northwest Ring		100	Köln-Niehl	Industriestraße	
Northwest Ring		BR	Leverkusener Brücke		
Northwest Ring		99	Leverkusen-West	A 59	4-way interchange
Northwest Ring		98	Leverkusen	A 3 / E35	4-way interchange
Through to A 1 / E31 / E37

== See also ==
- List of streets in Cologne
- Transport in Cologne
