= List of streets in Cologne =

This is an overview of streets and roads in the city of Cologne. It includes a list of notable streets, for historic, transportation or other reasons and is to present an understanding of the city's road systems. The scope of this article does not cover the city's public squares.

== Innenstadt streets ==
This is a list of some notable streets in Innenstadt, Cologne.

=== Streets and alleys in Altstadt ===
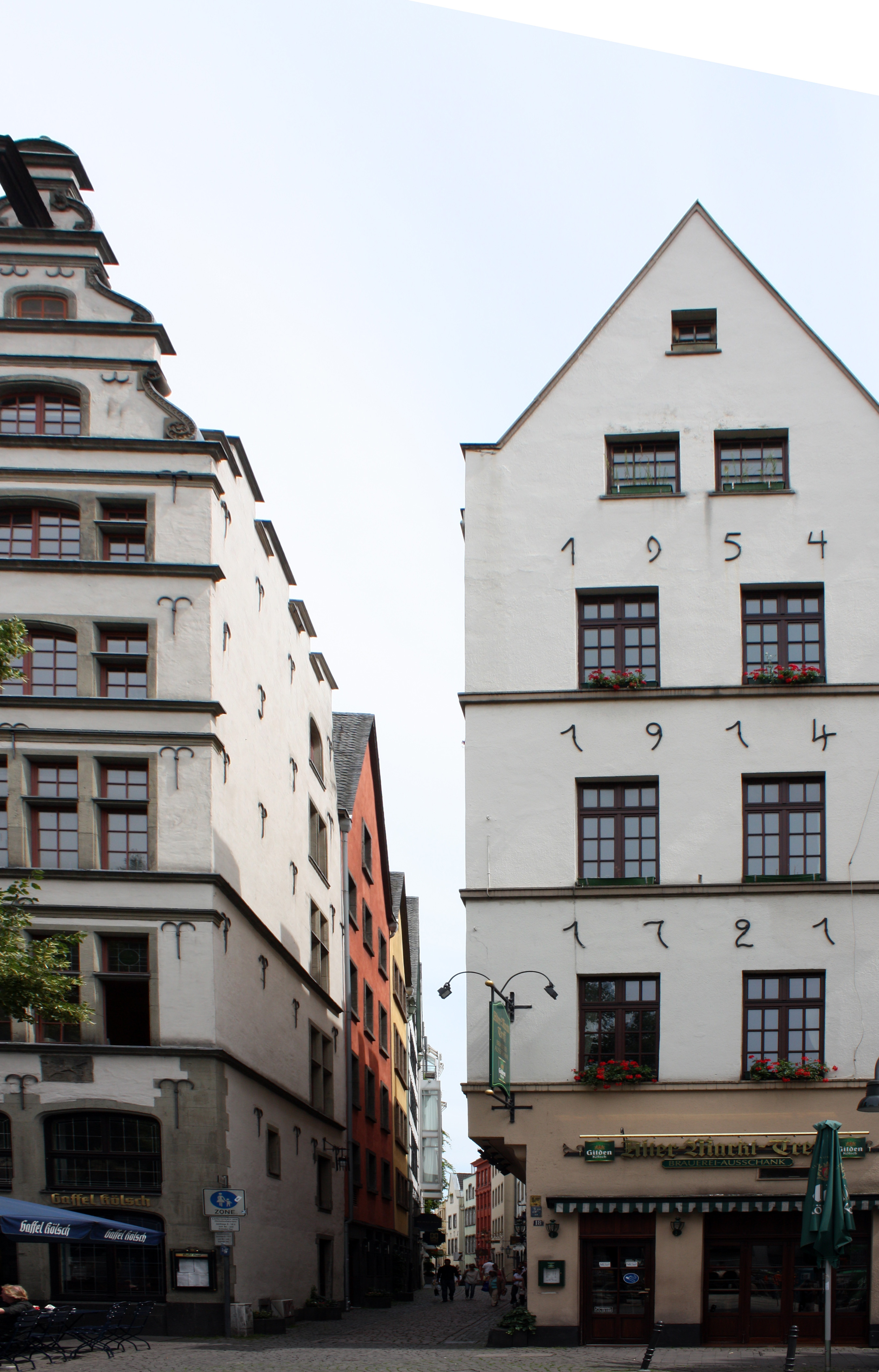
Entrance of Lintgasse, as seen from Alter Markt

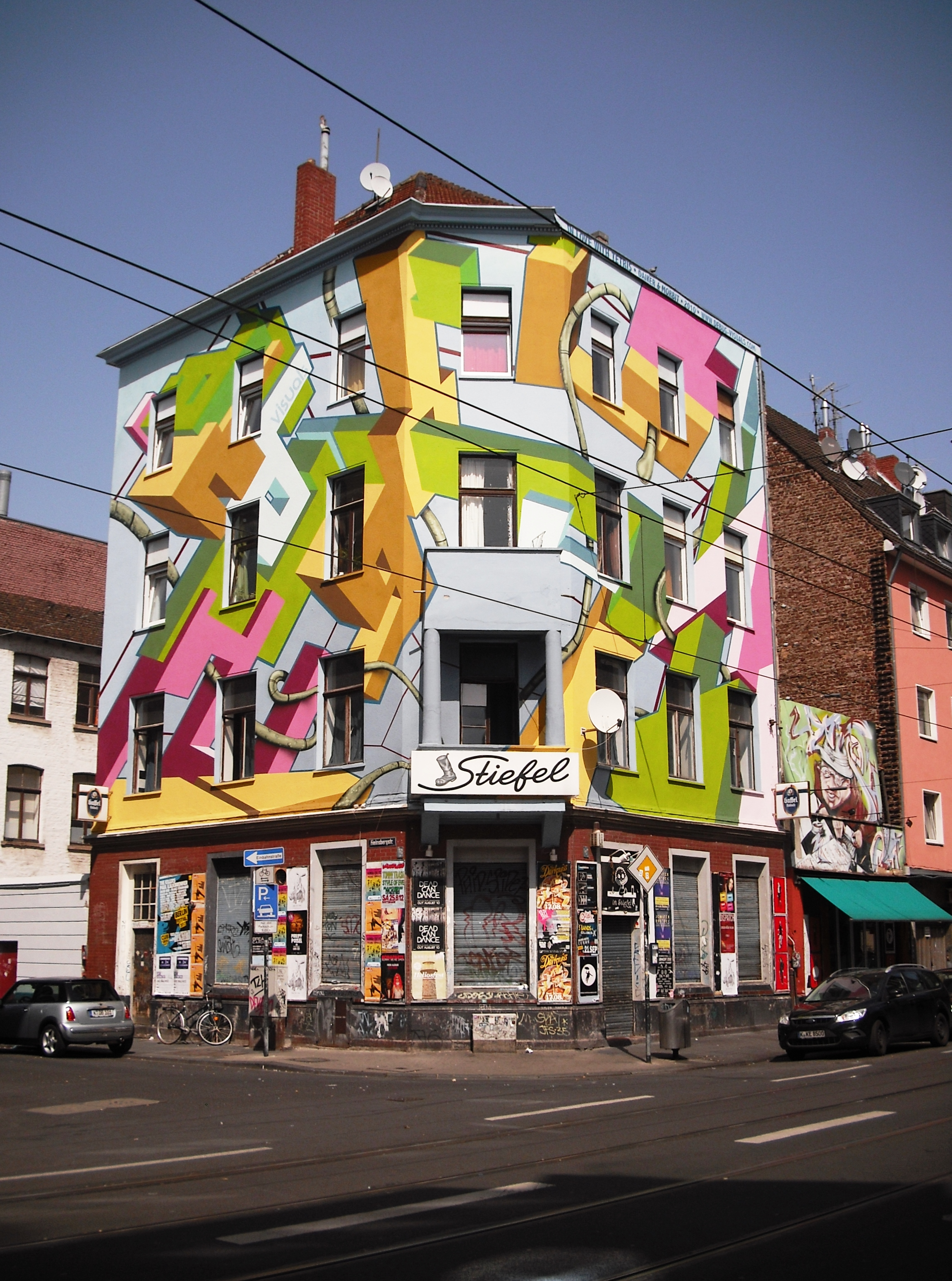
House at corner of Zülpicher Straße and Heinsbergstraße

| Street | Length | Landmarks | note |
|---|---|---|---|
| Am Hof | | Haus Saaleck, Früh brewery | |
| Am Leystapel | | St. Maria in Lyskirchen | |
| Breite Straße | 0,38 km | | pedestrian zone |
| Brückenstraße | | | pedestrian zone |
| Cäcilienstraße | | St. Cäcilien, Museum Schnütgen | |
| Ehrenstraße | 0,37 km | | tempo 30 zone |
| Eigelstein | | Eigelsteintor | tempo 30 zone |
| Filzengraben | | Holy Trinity Church | |
| Friesenstraße | 0,32 km | | tempo 30 zone |
| Gereonstraße | | St. Gereon | |
| Glockengasse | 0,23 km | 4711 House, Cologne Opera | |
| Gürzenichstraße | 0,32 km | Gürzenich | pedestrian zone |
| Hahnenstraße | 0,48 km | Hahnentor | |
| Hohe Straße | 0,68 km | Stollwerck Passage | pedestrian zone |

| Street | Length | Landmarks | note |
|---|---|---|---|
| Lintgasse | 0,13 km | Gaffel-Haus | pedestrian zone |
| Kartäusergasse | | Cologne Charterhouse | |
| Komödienstraße | | St. Andreas | |
| Krebsgasse | 0,27 km | | tempo 30 zone |
| Magnusstraße | | Römerturm | |
| Minoritenstraße | | Minorites Church, Kolumba | |
| Mittelstraße | 0,19 km | St. Aposteln | tempo 30 zone |
| Mühlenbach | | | |
| Rheingasse | | Overstolzenhaus | |
| Schaafenstraße | 0,25 km | | |
| Schildergasse | 0,50 km | Antoniterkirche, Weltstadthaus | pedestrian zone |
| Severinstraße | 1,05 km | Basilica of St. Severin, Severinstor | |
| Ulrichgasse | | Ulrepforte | |
| Zeughausstraße | | Zeughaus | |

=== Streets in Neustadt ===
| Street | Length | Landmarks | note |
|---|---|---|---|
| Aachener Straße | | Millowitsch-Theater | |
| Brüsseler Straße | 1,04 km | St. Michael | tempo 30 zone |
| Im Zollhafen | 0,71 km | Rheinauhafen | pedestrian zone |
| Maybachstraße | | MediaPark | tempo 30 zone |
| Moltkestraße | 0,67 km | Stadtgarten | |
| Neusser Straße | | St. Agnes | |

| Street | Length | Landmarks | note |
|---|---|---|---|
| Roonstraße | 0,80 km | Roonstrasse Synagogue | |
| Teutoburger Straße | | University of Applied Sciences | |
| Venloer Straße | | Friesenplatz | |
| Volksgartenstraße | 0,74 km | Volksgarten, Lutherkirche | |
| Weißenburgstraße | 0,55 km | St. Agnes, Oberlandesgericht | tempo 30 zone |
| Zülpicher Straße | | Sacred Heart Church | |

=== Streets in Deutz ===
| Street | Length | Landmarks | note |
|---|---|---|---|
| Deutzer Freiheit | 0,45 km | St. Heribert | pedestrian zone |
| Gotenring | 0,68 km | Severin Bridge | |
| Kennedy-Ufer | | Old St. Heribert | tempo 30 zone |
| Siegburger Straße | | Deutzer Hafen | |

== Principal ring roads ==
The city of Cologne possesses one of the most comprehensive urban ring road systems. The beltways were laid out during the end of the 19th and the early 20th century and today are still being complemented and extended. Their development originated in the work of architects and urban designers such as Karl Henrici, Josef Stübben and Fritz Schumacher as well as former Cologne mayors Hermann Heinrich Becker and Konrad Adenauer.

=== Cologne Ring ===
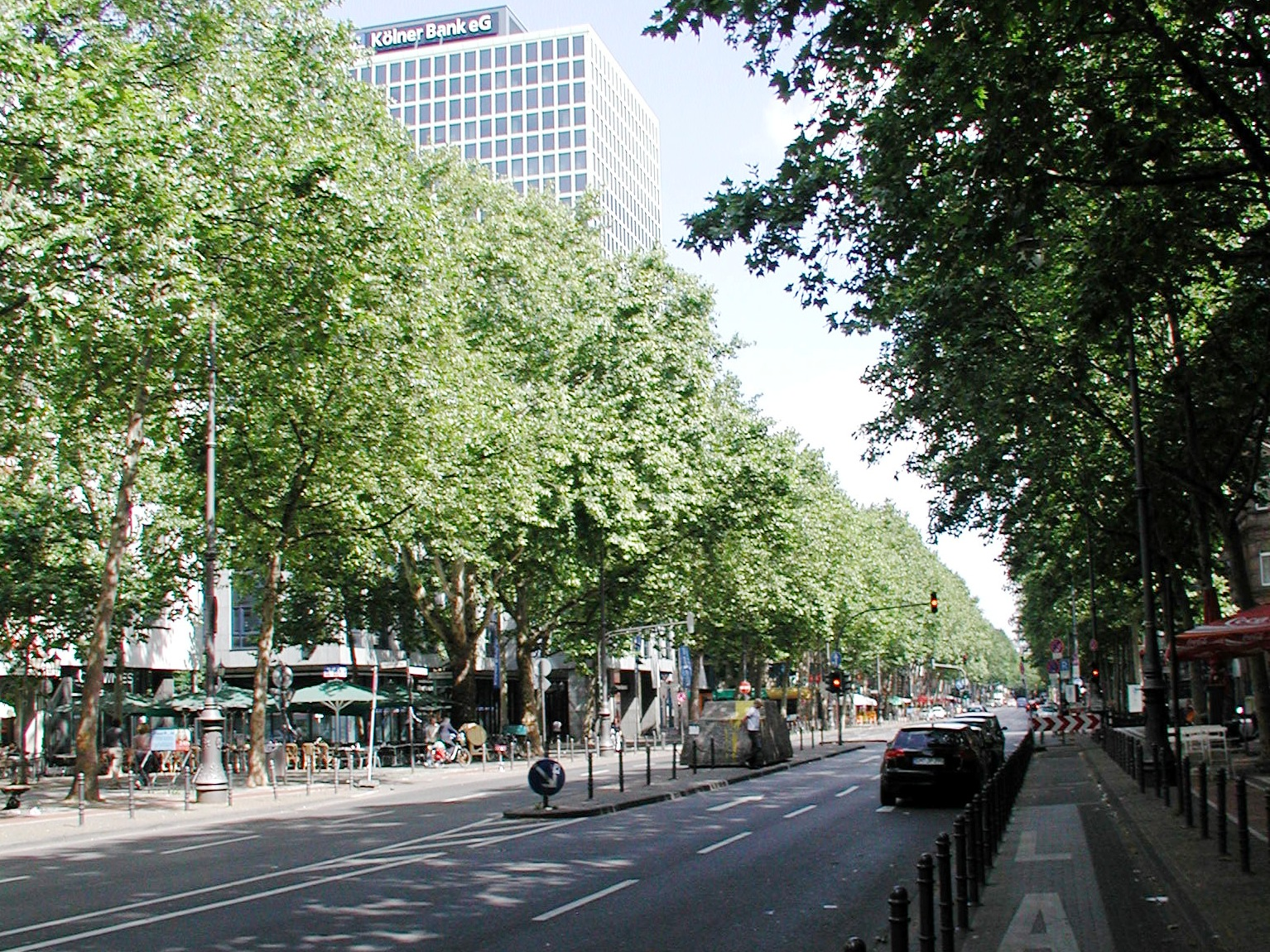
Hohenzollernring on the Cologne Ring

The Cologne Ring (German: Kölner Ring or plural Kölner Ringe) is a semi-circular, some 6 km long urban boulevard in Innenstadt, Cologne and the city's busiest and most prominent street system. The Cologne Ring is a four-lane street and part of Bundesstraße 9.

The ring sections between Barbarossaplatz and Ebertplatz are some of the busiest streets in Cologne.

| Roads | Length | Average distance to Cologne Cathedral | Note |
|---|---|---|---|
| Ubierring, Chlodwigplatz, Karolingerring, Sachsenring, Salierring, Barbarossaplatz, Hohenstaufenring, Habsburgerring, Rudolfplatz, Hohenzollernring, Kaiser-Wilhelm-Ring, Hansaring, Ebertplatz, Theodor-Heuss-Ring | 6.0 km | 1.6 km | Bundesstraße 9 |

=== Innere Kanalstraße ===
Innere Kanalstraße is part of a ring road system, which spans from Vorgebirgstraße in the south-west to Zoobrücke in the north-east. Innere Kanalstraße and Universitätsstraße are the longest of these streets and follow the outside outline of the Cologne Green Belt (German: Kölner Grüngürtel). They therefore encircle the district of Innenstadt to the west and north-west. These are mostly six-lane roads and follow the Inner Ring almost concentrically. Kanal- and Universitätsstraße are a major relief of traffic load on the Inner Ring. Landmarks on Universitätsstraße are the University, after which the street is named, and the Aachener Weiher with the Museum of East Asian Art. Landmarks on Innere Kanalstraße are the Colonius telecommunication tower and the Herkules tower.

| Roads | Length | Average distance to Cologne Cathedral | Note |
|---|---|---|---|
| Am Vorgebirgstor, Pohligstraße, Weißhausstraße, Universitätsstraße, Innere Kanalstraße, Zoobrücke | 10 km | 2.0 km | Bundesstraße 55a (partially) |

=== Cologne Belt ===
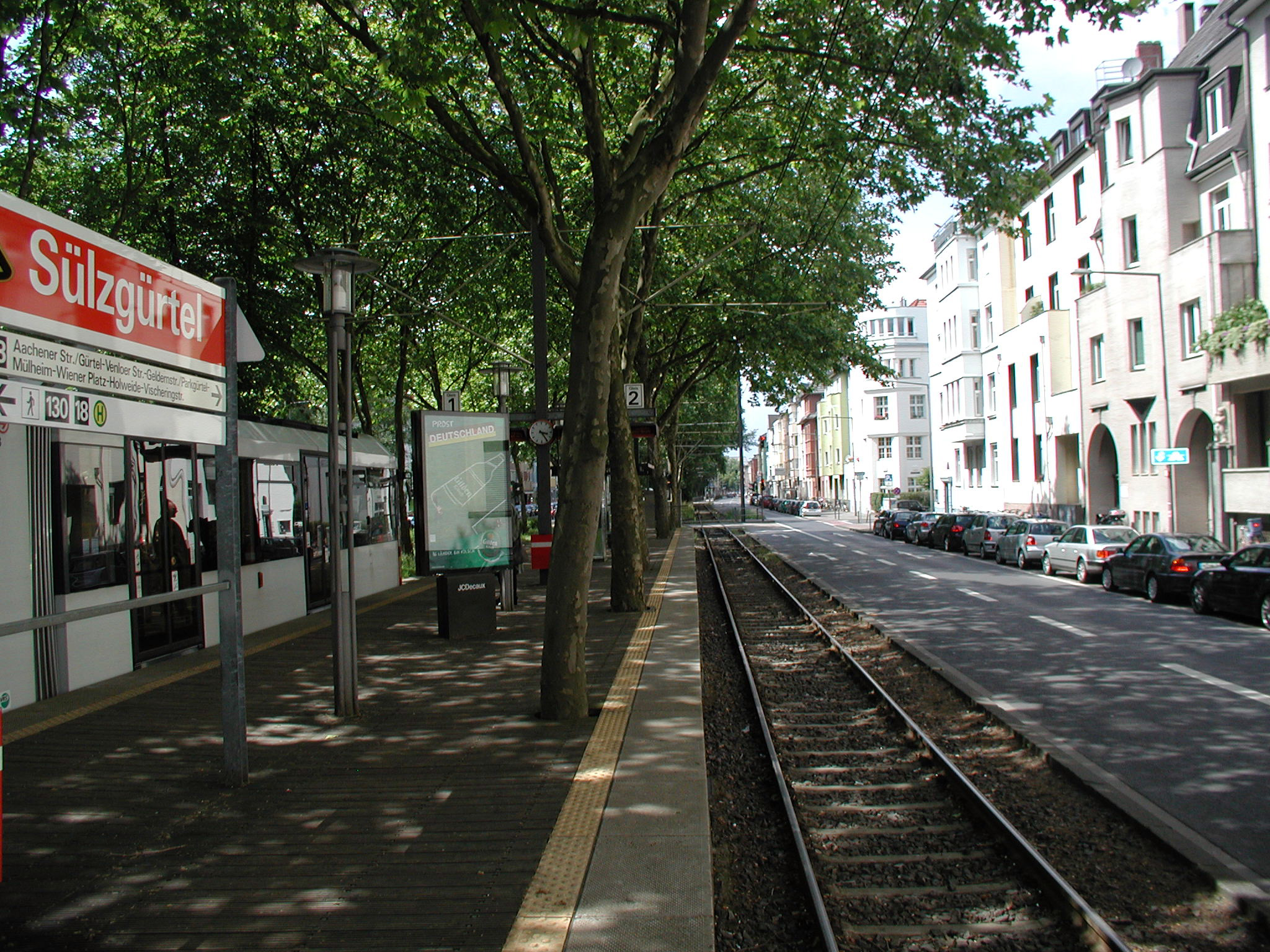
Sülzgürtel on the Cologne Belt

The Cologne Belt (German: Kölner Gürtel) is a system of ring roads which runs through the Left-Rhenish districts of Cologne. The sections of the Cologne Belt are mostly defined by the large arterial roads running perpendicular to them and are named after the districts and city parts they pass through. The Cologne Belt was set up in the early 20th century and is somewhat concentric to Kanal- and Universitätsstraße and the Cologne Inner Ring.

| Roads | Length | average distance to Cologne Cathedral | note |
|---|---|---|---|
| Bayenthalgürtel, Raderberggürtel, Raderthalgürtel, Zollstockgürtel, Klettenbergürtel, Sülzgürtel, Lindenthalgürtel, Stadtwaldgürtel, Melatengürtel, Ehrenfeldgürtel, Parkgürtel, Mauenheimer Gürtel, Niehler Gürtel | 15 km | 3.5 km | |

=== Militärringstraße ===
Only a minor street today, the Militärringstraße once had significance for the fortifications of Cologne during the 19th and early 20th century. The Militärring once was a true ring, encircling the entire city at a length of some 40 km (25 mi).

| Roads | Length | Average distance to Cologne Cathedral | Note |
|---|---|---|---|
| Militäringstraße | 25 km | 4.9 to 7.7 km | |

=== Cologne Beltway ===
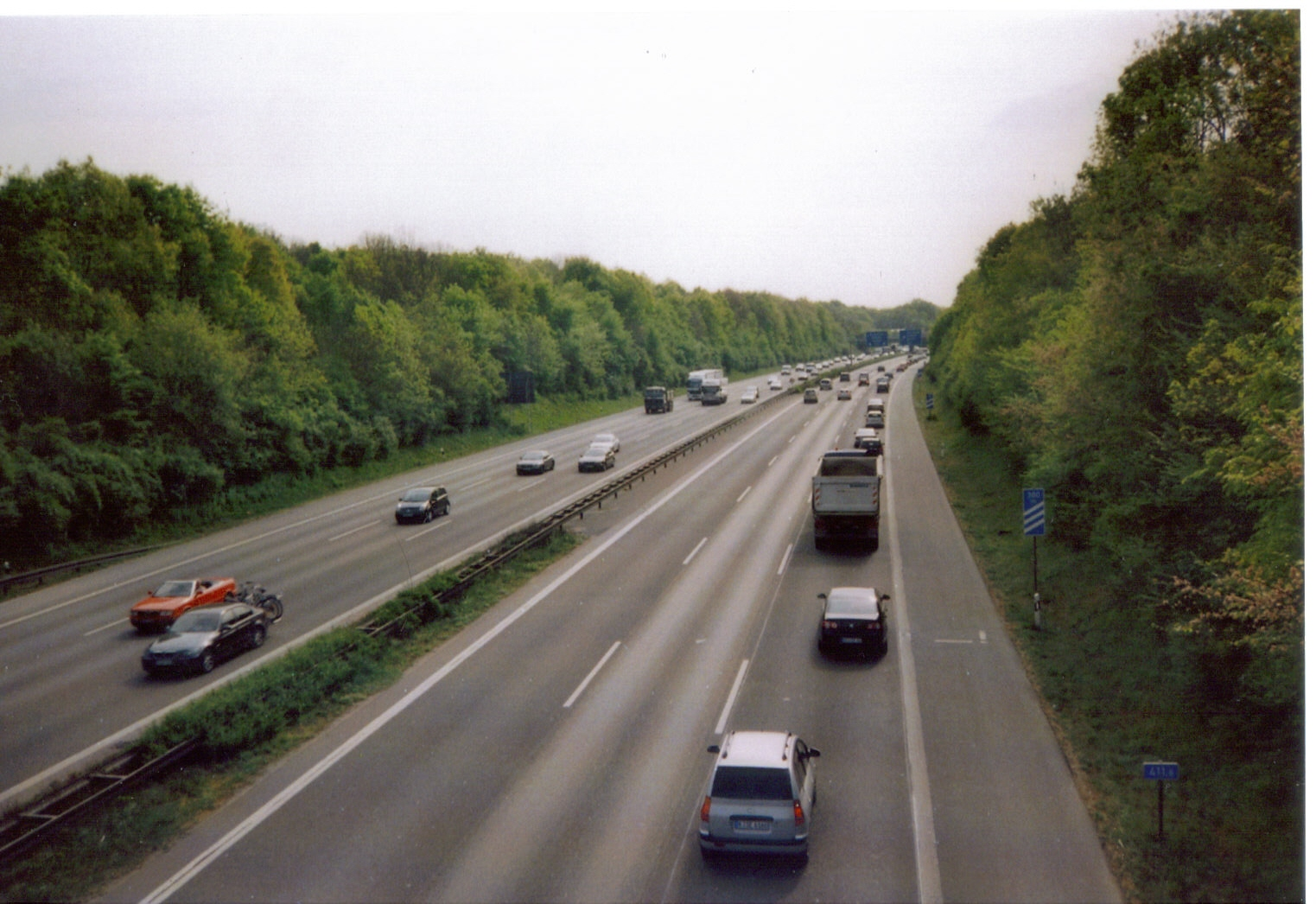
BAB 1 on the Cologne Beltway

The Cologne Beltway (German: Kölner Autobahnring) is the generic term for the Autobahns encircling Cologne. It consists of the Bundesautobahn 3, the Bundesautobahn 4 and the Bundesautobahn 1. With an average of 160,000 cars per day on the BAB 3 and 100,000 on A4 and A1, the beltway handles one of the highest traffic volumes in Germany.

The beltway crosses the Rhine at Leverkusen Bridge in the north and Cologne Rodenkirchen Bridge in the south. The Autobahns on the beltway cross Bundesautobahn 559, Bundesautobahn 555 and Bundesautobahn 57. The Bundesautobahn 59 is tied to the beltway at the interchange Leverkusen-West in the north and to Dreieck Heumar in the south. Cologne/Bonn Airport lies on the Bundesautobahn 59.

| Roads | Length | Average distance to Cologne Cathedral | Note |
|---|---|---|---|
| Bundesautobahn 3, Bundesautobahn 4, Bundesautobahn 1 | 50 km | 5.0 to 12.0 km | |

== Principal arterial roads ==
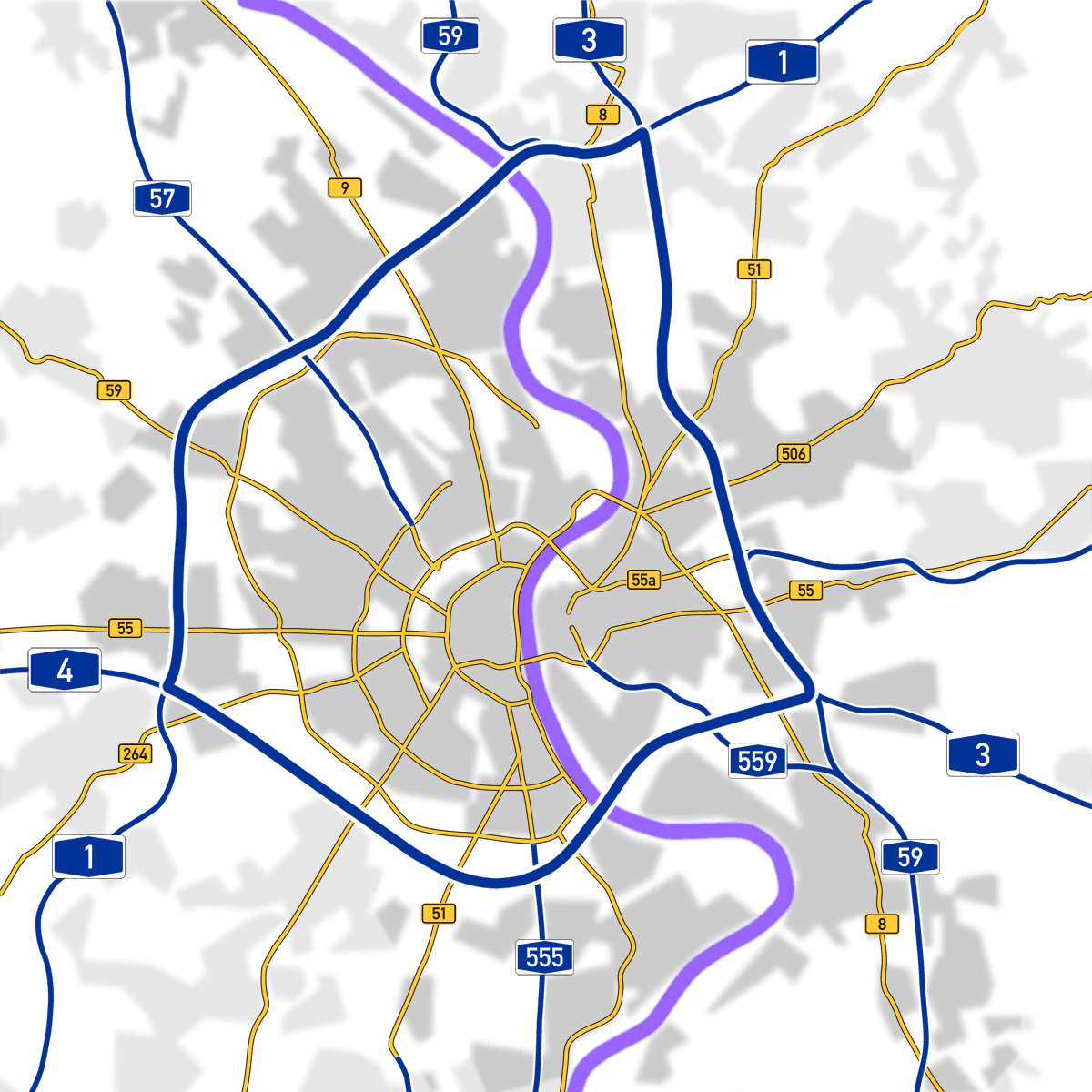
High and freeways in Cologne

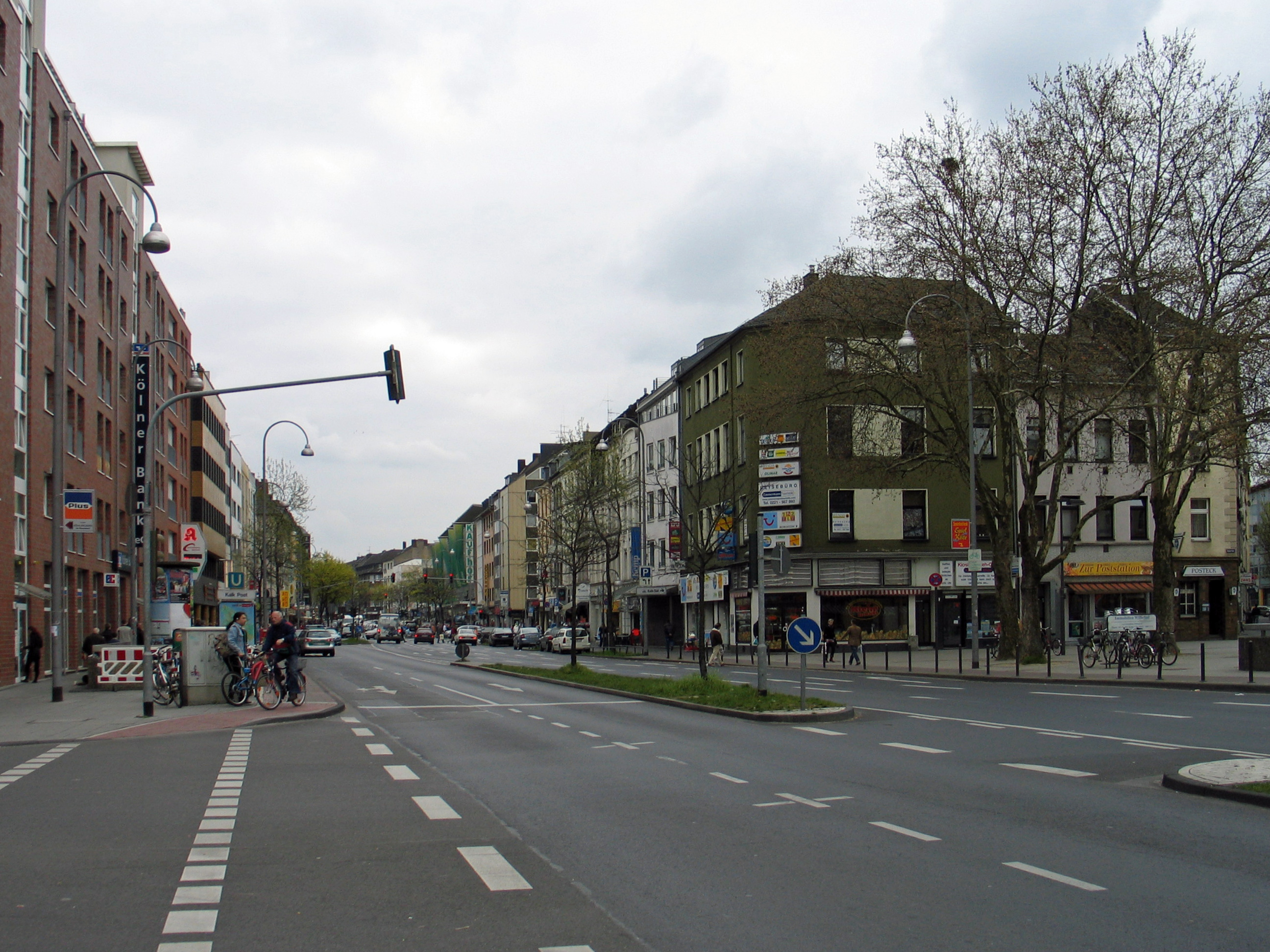
Kalker Hauptsraße

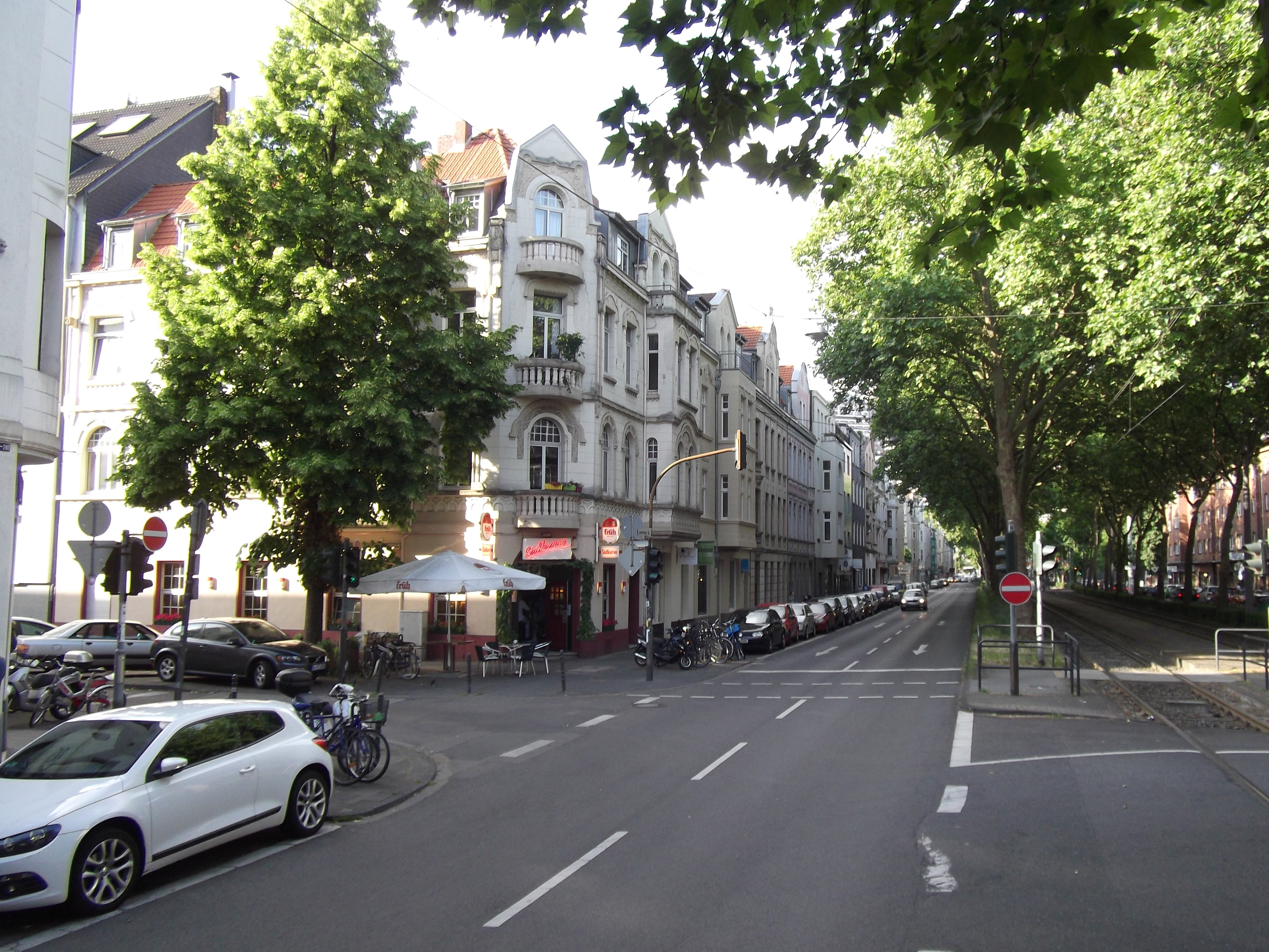
Luxemburger Straße

In the following a list of arterial roads, starting clockwise in the North-East. The names of some roads indicate the city or direction, they lead towards.

Right-Rhenish arterial roads all start in Deutz. Deutz is a city part of Innenstadt. Left-Rhenish arterial roads mostly start at the Cologne Ring. Of the major arterial roads, only Dürener Straße and the BAB 57 start on Universitätsstraße and Innere Kanalstraße respectively. Konrad-Adenauer-Ufer is a river embankment road, leading further into the center up to Hohenzollern Bridge.

=== Right-Rhenish arterial roads ===
| Road | Length | Districts | note |
|---|---|---|---|
| Pfälzischer, Bergischer and Clevischer Ring (extend into Düsseldorfer Straße) | | Deutz, Mülheim | B 8 Bundesstraße 8 |
| Stadtautobahn (extends into BAB 4) | 3,55 + 4,51 km^{within city limits} | Deutz, Mülheim, Kalk | B 55a Bundesstraße 55a |
| Deutz-Kalker-Straße (extends into Kalker Hauptstraße and Olpener Straße) | 1,06 + 1,63 + 6,06 km | Deutz, Kalk | B 55 Bundesstraße 55 |
| Östliche Zubringerstraße (part of BAB 559) | 8,40 km | Deutz, Porz | A 559 Bundesautobahn 559 |
| Siegburger Straße (extends into Kölner Straße and Hauptstraße) | 3,84 + 3,76 + 4,43 km | Deutz, Porz | |

=== Left-Rhenish arterial roads ===
| Road | Length | Districts | note |
|---|---|---|---|
| Agrippinaufer and Gustav-Heinemann-Ufer | | Innenstadt, Rodenkirchen | B 9 Bundesstraße 9 |
| Bonner Straße (extends into BAB 555) | 3,18 + 5,93 km^{within city limits} | Innenstadt, Rodenkirchen | A 555 Bundesautobahn 555 |
| Vorgebirgstraße | 2,62 km | Rodenkirchen | |
| Luxemburger Straße | 4,21 km^{within city limits} | Innenstadt, Lindenthal | B 265 Bundesstraße 265 |
| Dürener Straße | 6,08 km | Lindenthal | B 264 Bundesstraße 264 |
| Aachener Straße | 8,51 km^{within city limits} | Innenstadt, Lindenthal | B 55 Bundesstraße 55 |
| Venloer Straße | 8,48 km^{within city limits} | Innenstadt, Ehrenfeld | B 59 Bundesstraße 59 |
| Kreisstraße 4 (extends into BAB 57) | 1,47 + 14,71 km^{within city limits} | Ehrenfeld, Nippes, Chorweiler | A 57 Bundesautobahn 57 |
| Neusser Straße (extends into Neusser Landstraße) | | Innenstadt, Nippes, Chorweiler | B 9 Bundesstraße 9 |
| Riehler Straße | | Innenstadt, Nippes | |
| Konrad-Adenauer-Ufer | 1,78 km | Innenstadt | B 51 Bundesstraße 51 |

== See also ==
- Transportation in Cologne

== Bibliography ==
- Priebe, Ilona (2004). Kölner Straßennamen erzählen. Zwischen Schaafenstraße und Filzgraben. Bachem J.P. Verlag. ISBN 3-7616-1815-8.
- Signon, Helmut (2006), Alle Straßen führen durch Köln, Greven Verlag, ISBN 3-7743-0379-7
