= Hohe Straße =

Coordinates: 50°56′17.700″N 6°57′22.982″E

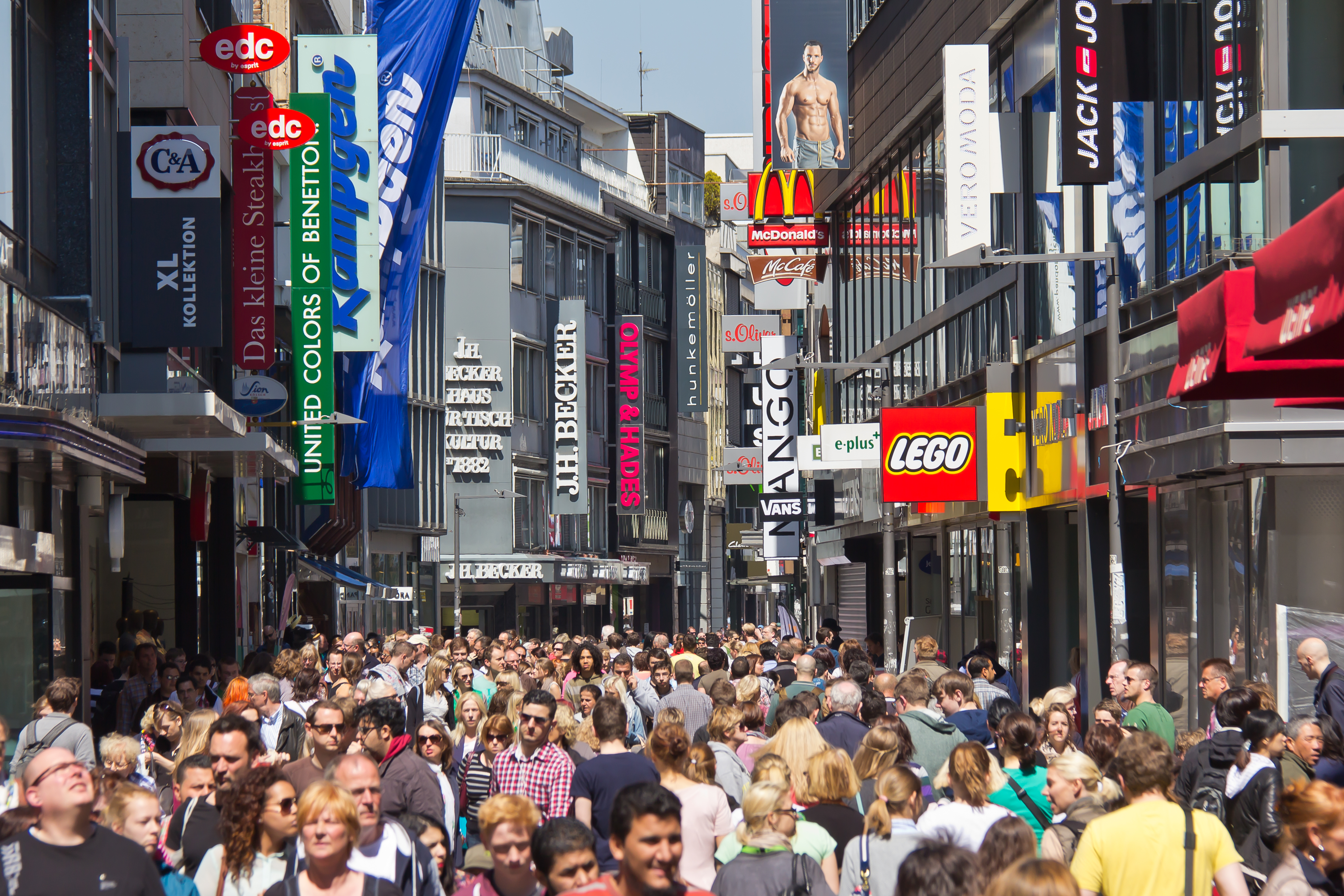
Hohe Straße in 2013

Hohe Straße is a shopping street in the old town of Cologne, Germany, and one of the city's both oldest and busiest streets. Together with many of its adjacent side streets, Hohe Straße is part of a designated pedestrian zone and spans about 680 metres from Cologne Cathedral on its Northern end to Schildergasse on its Southern end.

== History ==
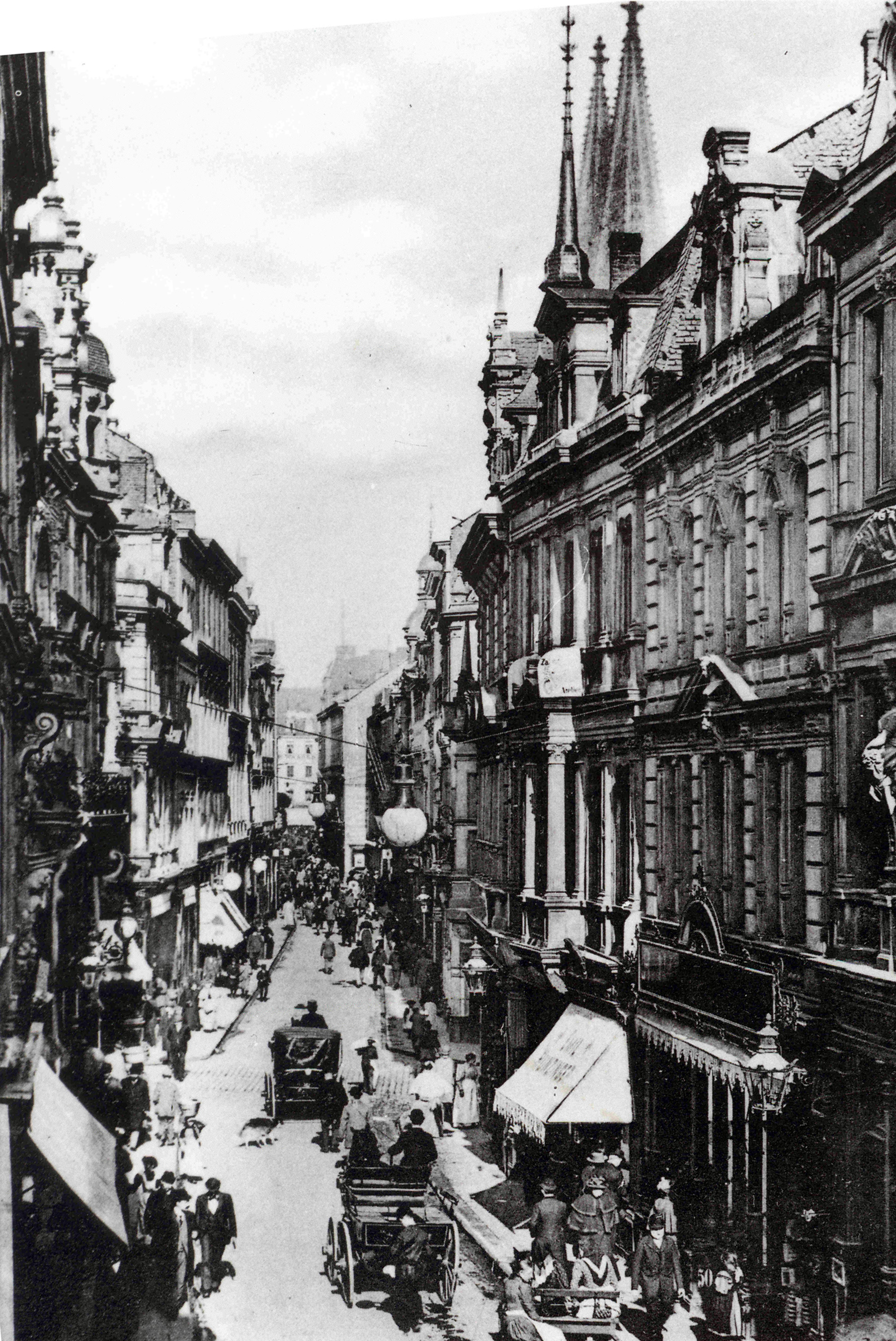
Hohe Straße in 1895

The street dates back to Roman times, when it was the city's Cardo Maximus, running parallel to the River Rhine. It was lined with stores, smithies, offices and various shops and vendors. At its centre lay the former forum and important buildings, like temples and the Praetorium. Two Roman legions had barracks, hospitals, canteens and thermae along its course. At this time, it spanned the entire city of Colonia Claudia Ara Agrippinensium, from the Northern Gate, located near today's cathedral, to the Southern Gate, located near today's St. Maria im Kapitol - then site of a Roman temple in honour of the Capitoline Triad.

Over the centuries, the street kept its central functions, but changed names numerous times and developed several distinct stretches. During the Early Middle Ages it was first called "strata lapidea" or "Steinweg", (meaning Stone Street), given that for a long time it remained an example of a Roman road. Later it had different names for various of its sections.

Already during late Antiquity, the quarter next to the Preatorium developed into Cologne's Jewish quarter. A document from the year 341 testified imperial privileges for an early synagoge. Building and site of the old Praetorium itself were later used by both Frankish Kings and - latest since the 1130s - the city's council. Still on this site today, the oldest parts of Cologne City Hall date back to the 1330s. Hohe Straße's section North of the city hall became center of the newly established University of Cologne in the year 1388.

During Cologne's incorporation into the First French Empire (1795–1814), Ferdinand Franz Wallraf created a survey of all streets in Cologne and their respective given names. The "Hohe Straße" (meaning High Street), as it was called at this time, derived its name from the "Hohe Pforte" (meaning High Porte) on the very Southern end of the street.

During the 19th century, Hohe Straße grew to become the busy shopping street it still is today. Shops and customers on Hohe Straße range all types and ages. Among today's landmarks on Hohe Straße are shopping passage of Cologne chocolatier Stollwerck and flagship store Leonhard Tietz of Galeria Kaufhof.

== Places of interest nearby ==
- Cologne Cathedral
- Cologne City Hall
- Cologne Archaeological Zone
- Museum für Angewandte Kunst
- Fragrance Museum
- Kolumba Museum
- Wallraf-Richartz Museum
- St. Maria im Kapitol

== See also ==
- List of streets in Cologne
- History of Cologne
- History of the Jews in Cologne

== Literature ==
- Signon, Helmut (2006), Alle Straßen führen durch Köln, Greven Verlag, ISBN 3-7743-0195-6
