= Zündorf Synagogue =

Former synagogue in Zündorf, Cologne, Germany

- German: Synagoge Zündorf
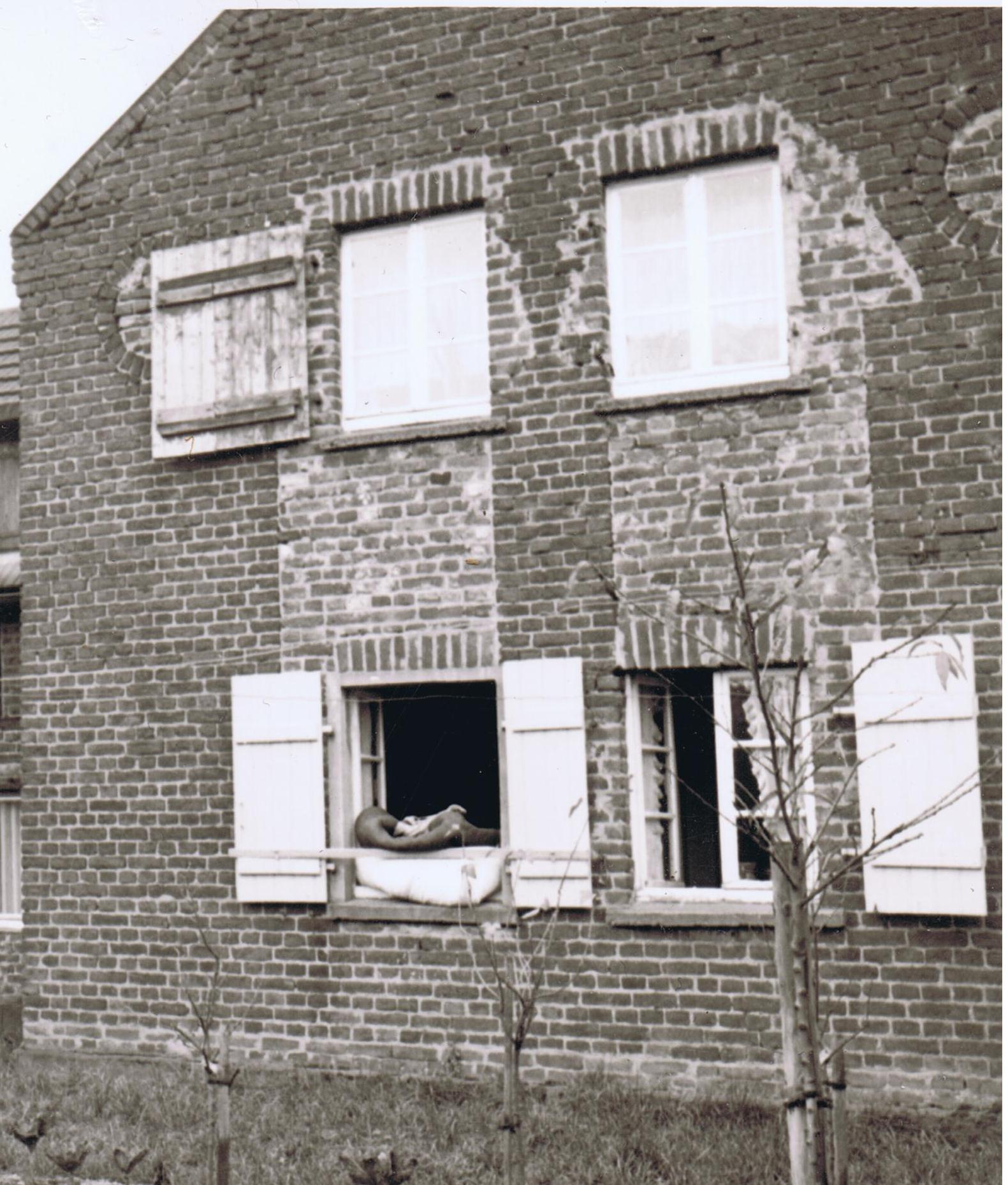
- The former synagogue in 1960

- Location of the former synagogue in North Rhine-Westphalia

Religion
- Affiliation: Judaism (former)
- Rite: Nusach Ashkenaz
- Ecclesiastical or organizational status: Synagogue (1882–1938); Residential building (since YYYY)

Location
- Location: Hauptstraße 159, Zündorf, Porz, near Cologne, North Rhine-Westphalia
- Country: Germany
- Interactive map of Zündorf Synagogue
- Coordinates: 50°52′08″N 7°02′41″E

Architecture
- Established: c. 1708 (as a congregation)
- Completed: 1882

Specifications
- Length: 8.9 m (29 ft)
- Width: 6.7 m (22 ft)
- Interior area: 59.6 m^{2} (642 sq ft)
- Materials: Brick

Zündorf Synagogue (German: Synagoge Zündorf) was a Jewish congregation, synagogue and cemetery, located at Hauptstraße 159, in Zündorf, Porz, near Cologne, in the state of North Rhine-Westphalia, in Germany. Zündorf was an important trading center, of Jewish farmers, butchers, moneylenders, small artisans or goods dealers from the early 18th century. Built in 1882, the synagogue fell into disrepair following World War II and was subsequently converted into a residential building.

== History ==
The Jewish history of Zündorf dates back to before 1700. The first historical evidence is the burial of the Jew Ishar on July 2, 1708 at the Deutz cemetery, which was also the last resting place for the Jews of Zündorf until the creation of a separate graveyard in 1923. The Jewish cemetery of Zündorf still has eight graves with six gravestones.

== Architecture ==
The two-storey building was made of brick and had a gable roof. It was 6.7 m (22 ft) wide and 8.9 m (29 ft) long. The floor area was only 59.6 m^{2} (642 sq ft). From the main road, it could only be reached via a three-metre-wide (9.8 ft) branch path that led past an old building.

In the west of the synagogue there were three large windows, each 1.50 m × 2.5 m (4 ft 11 in × 8 ft 2 in), and two arched windows. Two windows, which were rebuilt in 1938 into living space windows, lay at the back of the synagogue and another high window at the north-western corner of the house. This was bricked up.

== See also ==
- History of the Jews in Cologne
- List of synagogues in Germany (in German)
