= Lintgasse =

Coordinates: 50°56′17″N 6°57′41″E

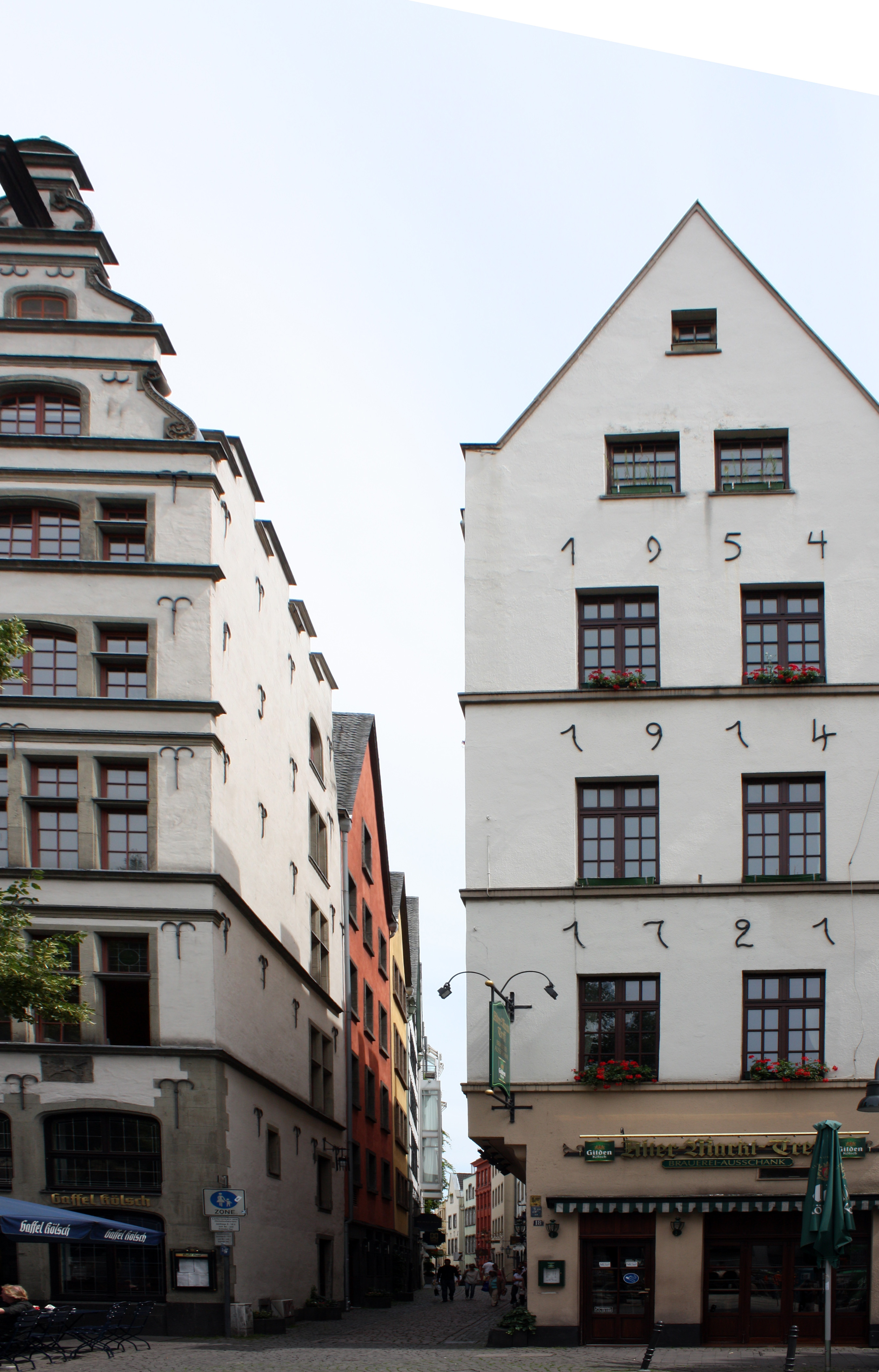
Lintgasse at Alter Markt; left: Gaffel Brewhouse

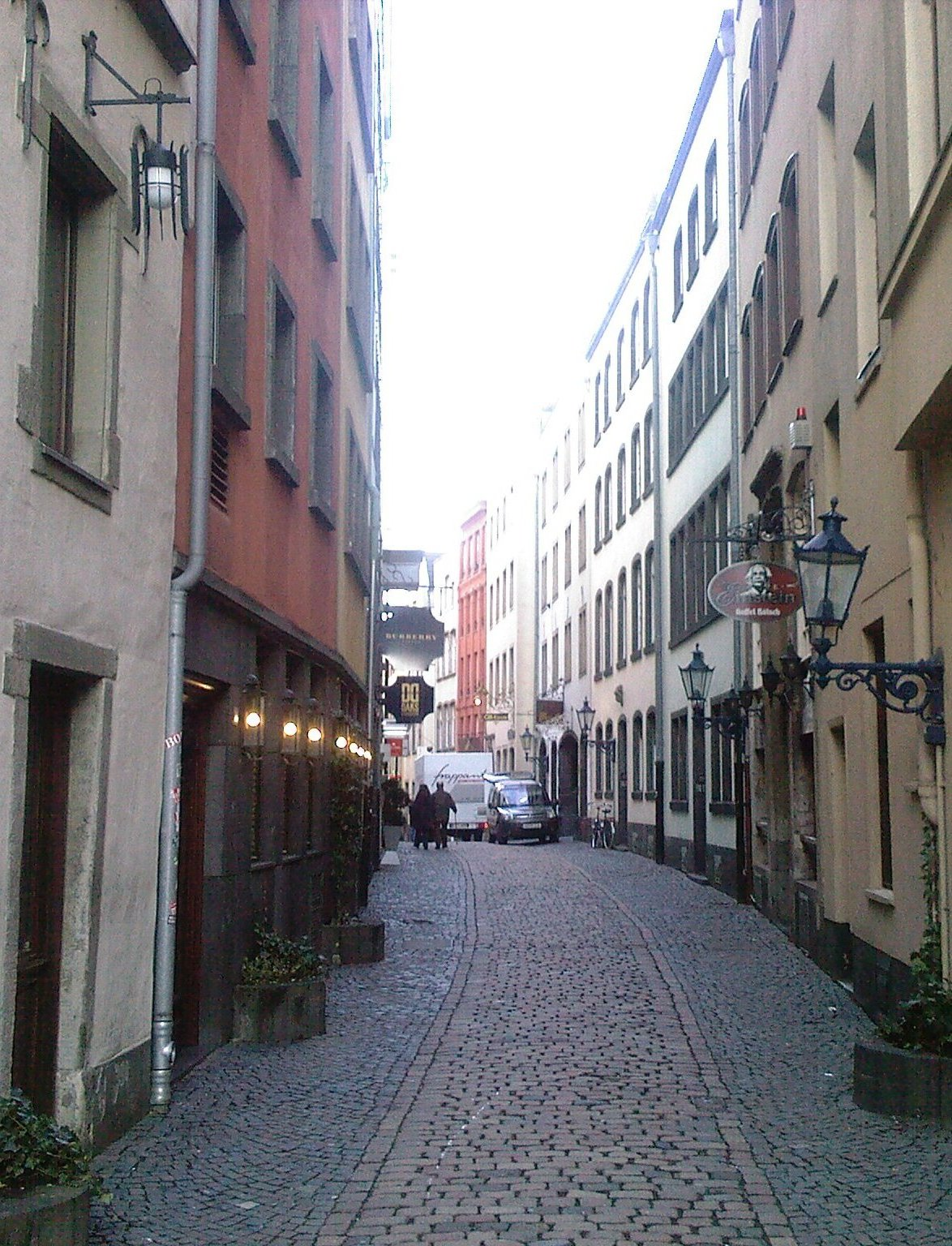
looking towards Fischmarkt; right: Lintgasse 8-14

Lintgasse is an alley (German: Gasse) in the Old town of Cologne, Germany between the two squares of Alter Markt and Fischmarkt. It is a pedestrian zone and only some 130 metres long, but is nevertheless famous for its medieval history.

The Lintgasse was first mentioned in the 12th century as in Lintgazzin, which may have derived from basketmakers described, weaving fish baskets out of Linden tree barks. These craftsmen were called Lindslizer, meaning "linden splitter". During the Middle Ages, the area was also known as platēa subri or platēa suberis, meaning "street of Quercus suber".

Lintgasse 8 to 14 used to be homes of medieval knights, as still can be seen by signs like Zum Huynen, Zum Ritter or Zum Gir. At Lintgasse 15 once stood the Parish of St. Brigiden, which became an elementary school during the 19th century. During this time, the Lintgasse was called Stink-Linkgaß, as the alley was unpopular for its poor air quality.

Lintgasse 9 has a passage to the nearby Great St. Martin Church. On the corner of Alter Markt and Lintgasse stands the listed Gaffel-Haus Zur Brezel. The brewhouse is a 7-storey Dutch Renaissance townhouse, built in 1213 but substantially extended in 1580. The building was a significant place in the history of Cologne and only converted into a beer house in the late 19th century.

== See also ==
- List of streets in Cologne
