= Zündorf =

Suburb of Cologne, Germany

Coordinates: 50°52′8″N 7°02′37″E

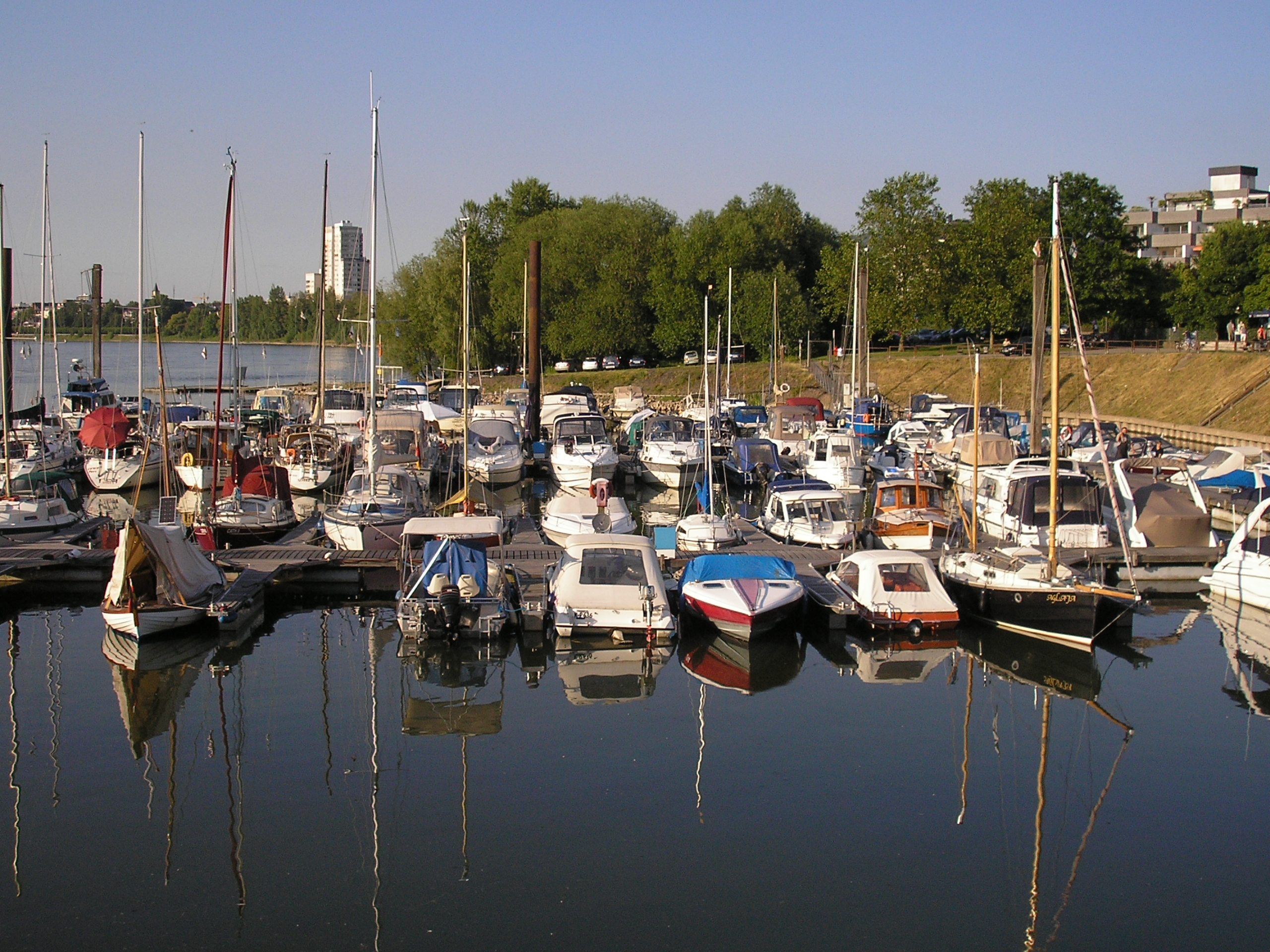
Marina at Groov

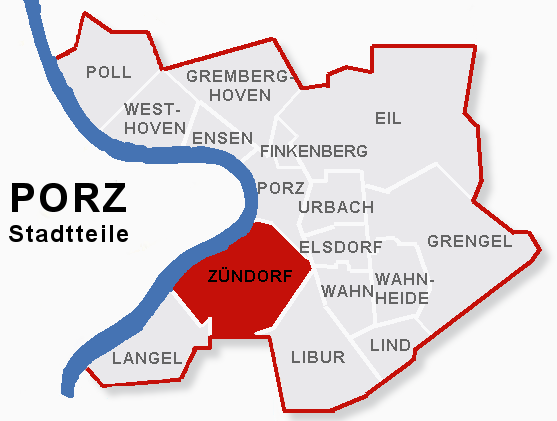
Map of Zündorf (shown in red) within the district of Porz

Zündorf (German pronunciation: [ˈtsyːndɔʁf]) is a suburb of Cologne, Germany and part of the district of Porz. Zündorf lies on the right bank of the river Rhine, between Langel and Porz. Zündorf has 12.229 inhabitants (as of 31 December 2008) and covers an area of 8,12 km^{2}.

The former village grew from a small trading post with staple rights on the Rhine isle of Groov, which nowadays is a peninsula and popular as a local recreation area with numerous outdoor restaurants as well as a rowing and pedal boat rental station.

== Public transport ==
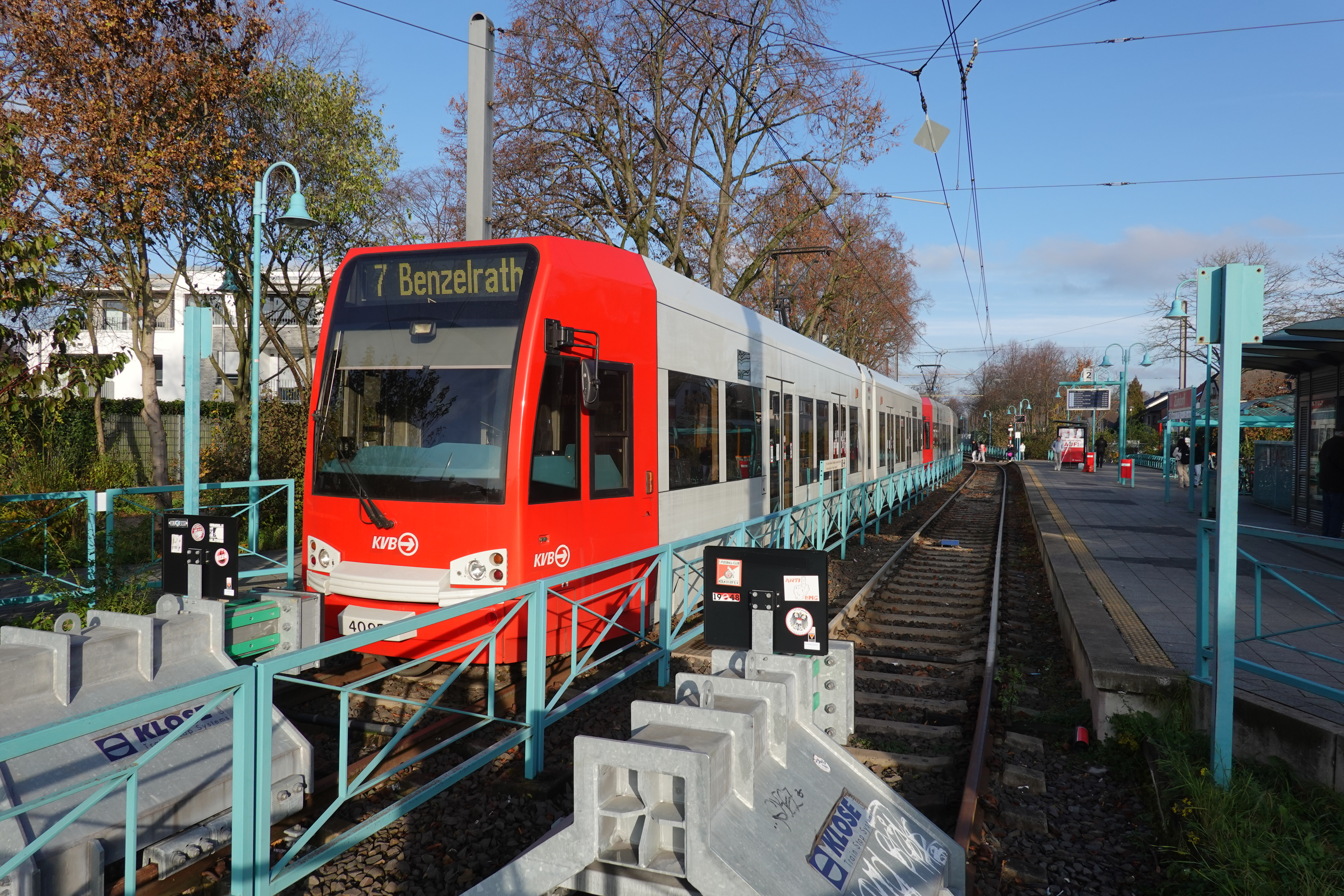
Zündorf stop

Zündorf is served by Cologne Stadtbahn line 7 and several Cologne bus lines. A ferryline links Zündorf to Weiß, a suburb of Cologne on the opposite Rhine bank.

== Groov ==
In the past, a river branch had been separated from the Rhine by the Groov island, also called Mittelwerth. Prone to silting, as a consequence of the 1831 staple right abolishment, the island was connected downstream to the mainland by a dam in 1849 and broadened in 1862 by newly established groynes.

Today, the Rhine branch consists of two lakes, which are linked to each other by two channel pipes. As there is no source of fresh water anymore, the lakes are threatened by collapse. Therefore, in the summertime, a floating fountain provides fresh oxygen to the water of the lower lake. The upper lake is supplied with fresh well water to achieve the same effect. The adjacent market place is equipped with foundations for a mobile flood protection wall and had been raised in comparison to the Rhine river in 1972 and subsequently in 2006.

== Jewish community ==
In Zündorf the Jewish community worshiped at the Zündorf Synagogue, located on the main street. The Jews were expelled during the Hitler era and some of them were murdered. The synagogue was converted into a residential building. Today the Jewish cemetery remains.
