= Bundesautobahn 555 =

Federal motorway in Germany

A 555
- Bundesautobahn 555
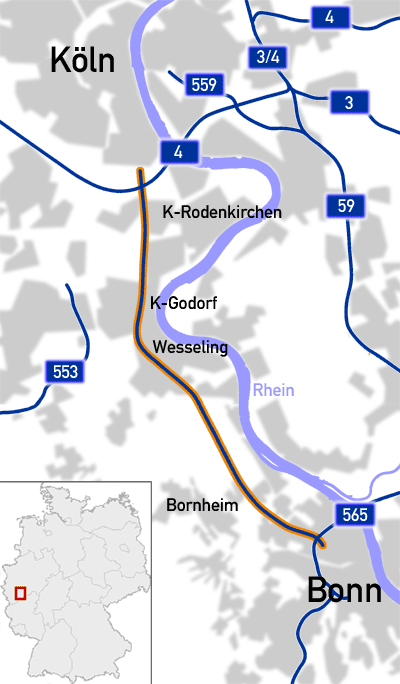

Route information
- Length: 18 km (11 mi)

Location
- Country: Germany
- States: North Rhine-Westphalia

Highway system
- Roads in Germany; Autobahns; List; Federal; List; State; E-roads

Bundesautobahn 555 (translates from German as Federal Motorway 555, short form Autobahn 555, abbreviated as BAB 555 or A 555) is an autobahn connecting the cities of Cologne and Bonn. It was constructed between 1929 and 1932, and opened to traffic on 6 August 1932.

Because it was the first public road that was limited to motorized vehicles and had no level crossings, it is commonly regarded as the oldest German Autobahn, even though it was only a country road at first and wasn't officially awarded Autobahn status until 1958. Until it was extended to six lanes between 1964 and 1966, there was no central barrier.

Except for deceleration at each end, the A 555 did not have a speed limit, resulting in about 15 km of mostly straight three-lane-road on flat terrain, enabling motorists to drive their vehicles at top speed. Especially at night, speeds in excess of 200 km/h were not unusual. In 2004, however, a speed limit was introduced around Wesseling for reasons of noise reduction, effectively cutting the area for legal speeding in half.

In Cologne, the A 555 spur has the by-name "Diplomatenrennbahn" (Diplomat race track), seemingly because foreign diplomats and state visitors liked to take a spin from Bonn to Cologne and back when Bonn still was the seat of government of West Germany. Bonn locals, however, used that term for the city's central stretch of B 9 due to the large number of diplomatic missions that were clustered in the area and the higher speed limit (70km/h rather than the normal urban 50km/h) limit in that area and it was before as airplane runway.

== Exit list ==
(1)	Verteilerkreis Köln B 51
(2)	Köln-Süd 4-way interchange A 4 E40
(3)	Köln-Rodenkirchen
(4)	Köln-Godorf
(5a)	Wesseling
	Im Eichkamp parking area
(5b)	Bornheim
	Bonn-West (planned)
	Bonn-Tannenbusch (planned)
	Bonn-Rheindorf (planned)
(6)	Bonn-Nord 4-way interchange A 565
(7)	Verteilerkreis Bonn
