= List of higher education associations and alliances =

List of educational groupings

Many institutions of higher education combine their resources so that they can share information and resources, coordinate research agendas, and afford each other mutual support.

== Global ==
- Academic Cooperation Association
- Agence universitaire de la Francophonie - Universities in French speaking countries and regions
- Association of Commonwealth Universities
- Global Alliance of Technological Universities
- International Association of Universities
- International Federation of Catholic Universities
- Mediterranean Universities Union
- Black Sea Universities Network
- BRICS Universities League
- Venice International University

Research networks:

- Global Universities for Societal Impact
- International Alliance of Research Universities
- International Association of Scientific and Technological University Libraries
- Matariki Network of Universities
- McDonnell International Scholars Academy
- PLuS Alliance
- Universitas 21
- Worldwide Universities Network

Subject groups:

- Association of MBAs
- Association of Universities for Research in Astronomy
- Association to Advance Collegiate Schools of Business
- Executive MBA Council
- EFMD Quality Improvement System
- Graduate Business Forum
- Global Network for Advanced Management
- Global Alliance in Management Education
- Globally Responsible Leadership Initiative
- Inter-university Consortium for Political and Social Research
- Law Schools Global League

== Africa ==
- Association of African Universities
- African Research Universities Alliance

== Arctic region ==
- University of the Arctic

== Asia–Pacific ==
- Alliance of Asian Liberal Arts Universities
- ASEAN University Network
- Asia-Oceania Top University League on Engineering
- Asian Universities Alliance
- Association of East Asian Research Universities
- Association of Pacific Rim Universities (also includes universities from the Americas)
- Association of Southeast Asian Institutions of Higher Learning
- Association of the Universities of Asia and the Pacific
- University Mobility in Asia and the Pacific

=== Australia ===
- Australian Technology Network
- Group of Eight (Australian universities) - A group of comprehensive Australian tertiary institutions intensive in research and professional education
- Innovative Research Universities
- Regional Universities Network
- Universities Australia

=== China ===
- Beijing-Hong Kong Universities Alliance
- C9 League
- Cooperation Consortium of Beijing High Technology Universities (Beijing Tech)
- Excellence League
- National Alliance of High-level Local Universities
- Sino-Spanish University Alliance
- Yangtze Delta Universities Alliance

=== India ===
- Association of Indian Universities
- Indian Institutes of Information Technology
- Indian Institutes of Technology
- Institutes of Eminence
- Institutes of National Importance
- National Institutes of Technology

=== Japan ===
- RU11

== Europe ==
The European Union has sponsored 64 European Universities alliances (as of 2024) under the European Universities Initiative of the Erasmus+ programme since 2019.

- 4EU+ Alliance
- Balkan Universities Network
- CESAER
- Coimbra Group
- Compostela Group of Universities
- European Association for International Education
- EUCOR
- EURODOC
- Europaeum
- European Consortium of Innovative Universities
- European University Association
- Euroleague for Life Sciences
- EuroTech Universities Alliance
- Guild of European Research-Intensive Universities (The Guild)
- IDEA League
- International Research Universities Network
- League of European Research Universities
- Network of Universities from the Capitals of Europe
- Una Europa
- Utrecht Network
- Young European Research Universities Network

=== France ===
- Couperin (Consortium unifié des établissements universitaires et de recherche pour l'accès aux publications numériques)

=== Germany ===
- U15
- TU9 (Germany)

=== Italy ===
- Conferenza dei Collegi Universitari di Merito

=== Spain ===
- Xarxa Vives d'Universitats - "Vives Network" - network of Catalan language universities

=== United Kingdom ===
Representative groups:

- GuildHE
- Universities UK

Mission groups:

- Cathedrals Group
- MillionPlus
- Russell Group
- University Alliance

Regional research consortia:

- Eastern ARC (Eastern Academic Research Consortium – eastern England)
- GW4 (southwest England and Wales)
- Midlands Innovation (English Midlands)
- N8 Research Partnership (northern England)
- Science and Engineering South (southeast England)
- SETsquared – business incubator consortium in southern England
- White Rose University Consortium (Yorkshire)

Other:

- Wallace Group – international development consortium

== The Americas ==
- Association of American Universities (US and Canada)
- Association of Pacific Rim Universities (also includes universities from the Asia–Pacific region)

=== Canada ===
- Associated Canadian Theological Schools
- Association of Colleges and Universities of the Canadian Francophonie
- Canadian Alliance of Student Associations
- Canadian Association of College and University Student Services
- Canadian Association of University Teachers
- Canadian Federation for the Humanities and Social Sciences
- Canadian Federation of Students
- Colleges and Institutes Canada
- Council of Ontario Universities
- Maple League
- Polytechnics Canada
- U15 Group of Canadian Research Universities
- Undergraduates of Canadian Research Intensive Universities
- Universities Canada

=== Mexico ===
- ANUIES
- AMPEI

=== United States ===
- American Association of Colleges and Universities
- American Association of Community Colleges
- American Association of State Colleges and Universities
- American Association of University Professors
- American Council of Education
- American Council of Learned Societies
- American Educational Research Association
- Association of American Universities
- Association of Governing Boards of Universities and Colleges
- Association of Independent Technological Universities
- Association of Public and Land-grant Universities
- Career Education Colleges and Universities
- Coalition of Urban Serving Universities
- National Association of Independent Colleges and Universities
- Oak Ridge Associated Universities

Religious:

- Association of Catholic Colleges and Universities
- Association of Jesuit Colleges and Universities – An organization made up of Jesuit institutions of higher education in the United States

Subject groups:

- Association of American Law Schools
- Association of American Medical Colleges
