= GW4 =

Consortium of universities in the United Kingdom

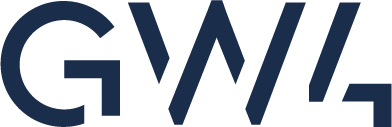
- Formation: January 2013
- Type: Consortium of United Kingdom-based universities
- Region served: Wales and South West England
- Members: University of Bath; University of Bristol; Cardiff University; University of Exeter
- Website: gw4.ac.uk

The GW4 Alliance (also known as GW4) is a consortium of four research intensive universities in South West England and Wales. It was formed in January 2013 by the universities of Bath, Bristol, Cardiff and Exeter to enhance research collaboration and innovation, and launched at the House of Commons in October 2014. It is the UK's first pan-regional partnership, involving an institution from a devolved nation.

== Universities ==
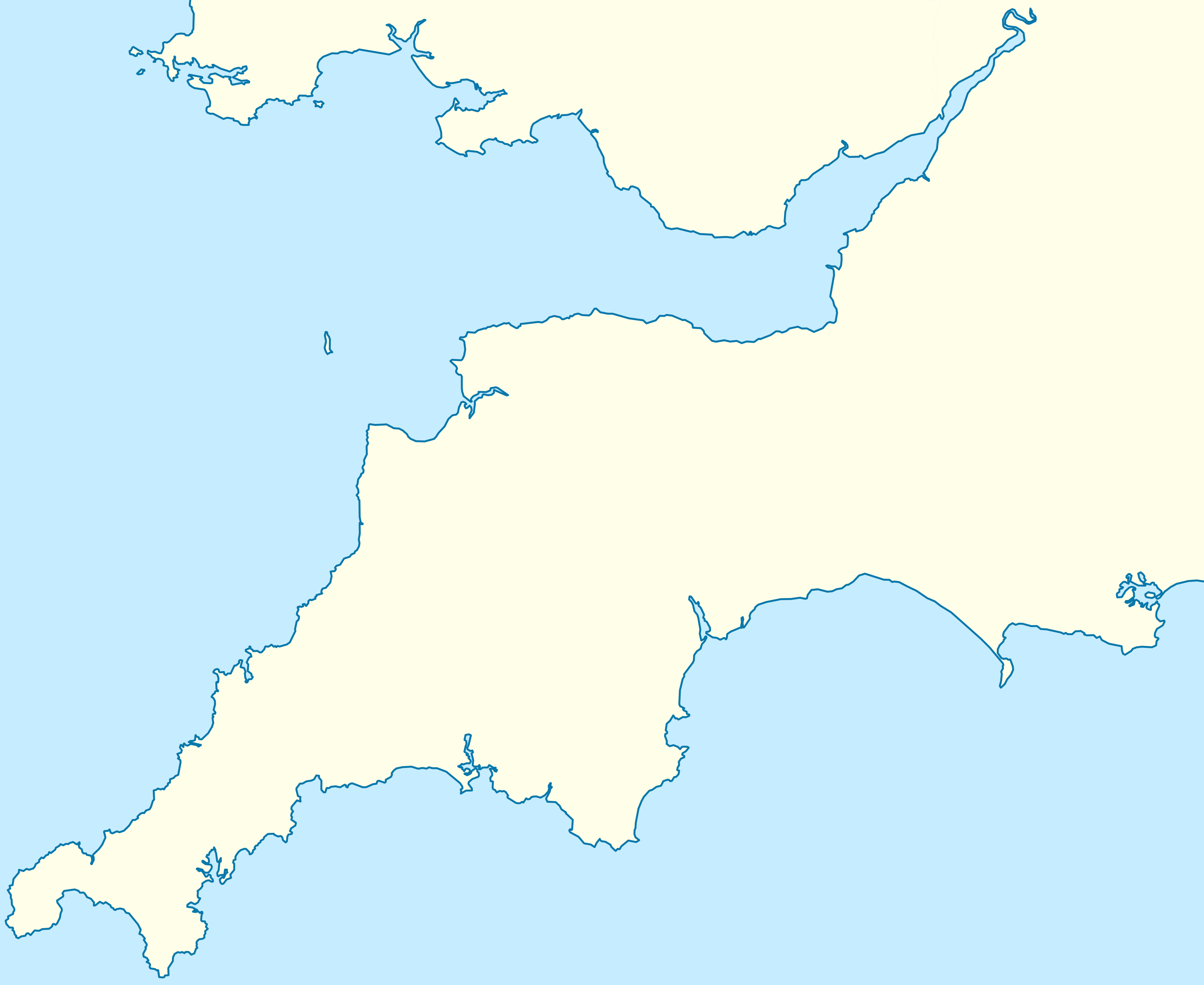
Map of South West England and South Wales showing the GW4 universities

University	Undergraduate students (2024/25)	Postgraduate students (2024/25)	Total students (2024/25)	Total academic staff (2024/25)	Total income (2024/25, £ millions)	Research income (2024/25, £ millions)
South West England
University of Bath	15,995	4,535	20,530	1,660	417	49
University of Bristol	23,865	8,570	32,435	3,825	1,155	342
University of Exeter	23,500	9,605	33,105	4,005	681	137
Wales
Cardiff University	24,645	6,860	31,505	3,880	628	131

== History ==
The idea for the GW4 Alliance was first proposed in 2011 by Sir Eric Thomas, the then-Vice Chancellor of the University of Bristol. The concept was to bring together the research strengths of the four universities in order to achieve greater impact and competitiveness in research, innovation, and knowledge exchange.

The GW4 universities contribute to the global knowledge economy with a combined annual research income of over £465 million and a £2.4 billion annual turnover. GW4 universities employ over 13,000 academic staff and educate over 33,000 postgraduate and 82,000 undergraduate students. GW4 institutions host over 40 externally funded Doctoral Training Centres and Partnerships and are home to over 7000 doctoral researchers. Of these, 14 are GW4 programmes covering a range of disciplines and include industry placements.

Since the alliance's inception, multiple rounds of funding have been secured for projects spanning a range of disciplines. In 2014, the group launched a research project into the use of algae to clean up contaminated water at the Wheal Jane tin mine and extract the heavy metals. In 2015 the consortium secured £4.6M from the Medical Research Council for a collaborative PhD training programme in biomedical research.

In 2016, in accordance with alliance's commitment to collaboration, the GW4 Alliance received funding from the Arts and Humanities Research Council to carry out a project "GW4 Bridging the Gap" to encourage collaboration between universities, cultural organisations and local authorities with the aim of growing the creative and cultural economy in South West England and South Wales. In 2019, GW4 developed this project and partnered with the National Trust, the first regional partnership of its kind for the National Trust, involving multiple universities across the South West and Wales.

GW4 provides seed funding for collaborative, interdisciplinary research and innovation research communities. The GW4 Alliance has invested over £3.2M in 105 collaborative research communities, which have generated £63.4M in research income. For every £1 GW4 spends on collaborative research communities, GW4 captures £20 in external research awards.

In 2018, in collaboration with the Met Office, and global supercomputer leader Cray Inc., the GW4 announced the largest Arm-based Supercomputer in Europe, GW4 Isambard. In 2020, GW4 together with the Met Office, Hewlett Packard Enterprise and other partners, were awarded £4.1 million by the Engineering and Physical Sciences Research Council to create Isambard 2, a £6.5 million facility, hosted by the Met Office in Exeter and utilised by the universities of Bath, Bristol, Cardiff and Exeter, and external researchers, doubling the size of GW4 Isambard.

A strategic partnership between the GW4 Alliance and Western Gateway was announced in March 2022, aiming to strengthen collaborative activities to drive green and economic regional growth. The partnership will work together to level up communities and help the world achieve a net zero carbon economy. In August 2022, the partnership announced a vision for South West England and South Wales to become the UK's first Hydrogen Ecosystem. An interactive online map has been released, highlighting the numerous industries, universities, research organisations and local authorities involved in realising hydrogen's potential as a low carbon energy source.

GW4 has also partnered with the Great South West, which covers Devon, Cornwall, Somerset, and Dorset – an area whose economy is worth £64.4 billion – almost double the size of Greater Manchester or West Midlands.

In 2023, the vice-chancellors of the GW4 Alliance institutions wrote to the science secretary, Michelle Donelan, and the education secretary, Gillian Keegan, calling on the government to expand childcare support schemes so they can be accessed by postgraduate researchers. This move reflected the GW4 Alliance's commitment to supporting researchers, further demonstrated by the number of GW4's various innovative programmes available supporting researchers from diverse backgrounds, notably GW4Connect.

== See also ==
- N8 Research Partnership
- Science and Engineering South
- M5
- Eastern Arc
