= Asian Universities Alliance =

Asian university alliance

Asian Universities Alliance (AUA)
- Formation: April 29, 2017; 9 years ago
- Founded at: Tsinghua University, Beijing, China
- Headquarters: Tsinghua University
- Members: 15 Asian Universities
- President: WANG Xiqin (President, Tsinghua University)
- Executive President: Ghaleb Ali AlHadrami AlBreiki (Acting Vice Chancellor, United Arab Emirates University)
- Website: www.asianuniversities.org

The Asian Universities Alliance (AUA) is a university alliance comprising 15 member institutions across Asia. Initiated at Tsinghua University in March 2016 and founded on 29 April 2017, through its platform AUA aims to cooperatively address regional and global challenges relating to higher education as well as economic, scientific and technological development. The Presidency is currently held by Tsinghua University and the current Executive Presidency for 2021–22 is Universiti Malaya. The Secretariat is permanently hosted by Tsinghua University.

== Members ==
Member Institution	Country/Region
Chulalongkorn University	Thailand
The Hong Kong University of Science and Technology	Hong Kong, China
Indian Institute of Technology Bombay	India
King Saud University	Saudi Arabia
National University of Singapore	Singapore
Nazarbayev University	Kazakhstan
Peking University	China
Seoul National University	South Korea
Tsinghua University	China
United Arab Emirates University	United Arab Emirates
Universitas Indonesia	Indonesia
University of Colombo	Sri Lanka
University of Malaya	Malaysia
The University of Tokyo	Japan
University of Yangon	Myanmar

== Governance ==
The Board is the governing body of the AUA and consists of the heads of member institutions. There are currently 15 Board Members i.e. the heads of the 15 AUA member institutions.

AUA Board Members
Bundhit Eua-arporn, President, Chulalongkorn University
Nancy Ip, President, The Hong Kong University of Science and Technology
Subhasis Chaudhuri, Director, Indian Institute of Technology Bombay
Badran A. Alomar, Rector, King Saud University
TAN Eng Chye, President, National University of Singapore
Shigeo Katsu, President, Nazarbayev University
GONG Qihuang, President, Peking University
Honglim Ryu, President, Seoul National University
WANG Xiqin, President, Tsinghua University
Ghaleb Ali Al Hadrami Al Breiki, Acting Vice Chancellor, United Arab Emirates University
Ari Kuncoro, Rector, University of Indonesia
H.D. Karunaratne, Vice Chancellor, University of Colombo
Mohd. Hamdi Abd. Shukor, Vice Chancellor, Universiti Malaya
FUJII Teruo, President, The University of Tokyo
Tin Maung TUN, Rector, University of Yangon

== AUA Scholars Award Program ==
In March 2018, the AUA Scholars Award Program (AUASAP) was launched with the purpose of increasing the mobility of scholars among the AUA member universities. The Award is open to all faculty members and researchers of AUA universities. AUA provides financial support to up to 60 Scholars each year who wish to conduct short-term academic visits at another overseas AUA university. Scholars are encouraged to take this opportunity to advance research, share knowledge, conduct field study or establish international academic links in the community of AUA.

== AUA Staff Exchange Program ==
In order to enhance communications between staff of the AUA members, AUA established the AUA Staff Exchange Program (AUASEP) in April 2018. The program provides financial support to up to 15 staff per year from an AUA member university or the Secretariat to carry out a one-week visit to another overseas AUA member or the Secretariat.

== Research Collaboration ==
Each year, AUA supports its member institutions to hold academic conferences on topics drawn from the AUA themes. The conferences aim to bring together peer scholars from AUA member institutions to meet, share and discuss their research of a particular academic domain. AUA also supports member institutions to develop joint research initiatives as well as a document delivery service among libraries of member institutions.

== Strategy and Policy ==
The AUA Presidents Forum (AUAPF) is held annually during the AUA Summit, university leaders congregate for high-level dialogues on the development of strategic plans, the improvement of management systems, and to address problems related to higher education. AUA also encourages developing dialogues and platforms for exchange among senior managers and staff of specific departments with the purpose of sharing best practices.

List of AUA Presidents Forums	Theme	Date
AUA Presidents Forum 2020	Knowledge is Power: The Resilience of Asian Universities in a VUCA World	26 November 2020
AUA Presidents Forum 2019	Session 1: Roles of Universities in the Sustainability Agenda Session 2: Innovation and Entrepreneurship Ecosystems: Asian Perspectives on Technological Stewardship and Higher Education	14 April 2019
AUA Presidents Forum 2018	The Rise of Asian Universities	10 April 2018
AUA Presidents Forum 2017	Shaping a Better Future for Asian Higher Education	29 April 2017
