= British Business School in Prague =

Coordinates: 50°4′50″N 14°25′27″E

BRITISH BUSINESS SCHOOL s.r.o.
- Established: 2010; 16 years ago
- Director: Mgr. Jan Spour
- Location: Prague, Czech Republic
- Website: britschool.cz
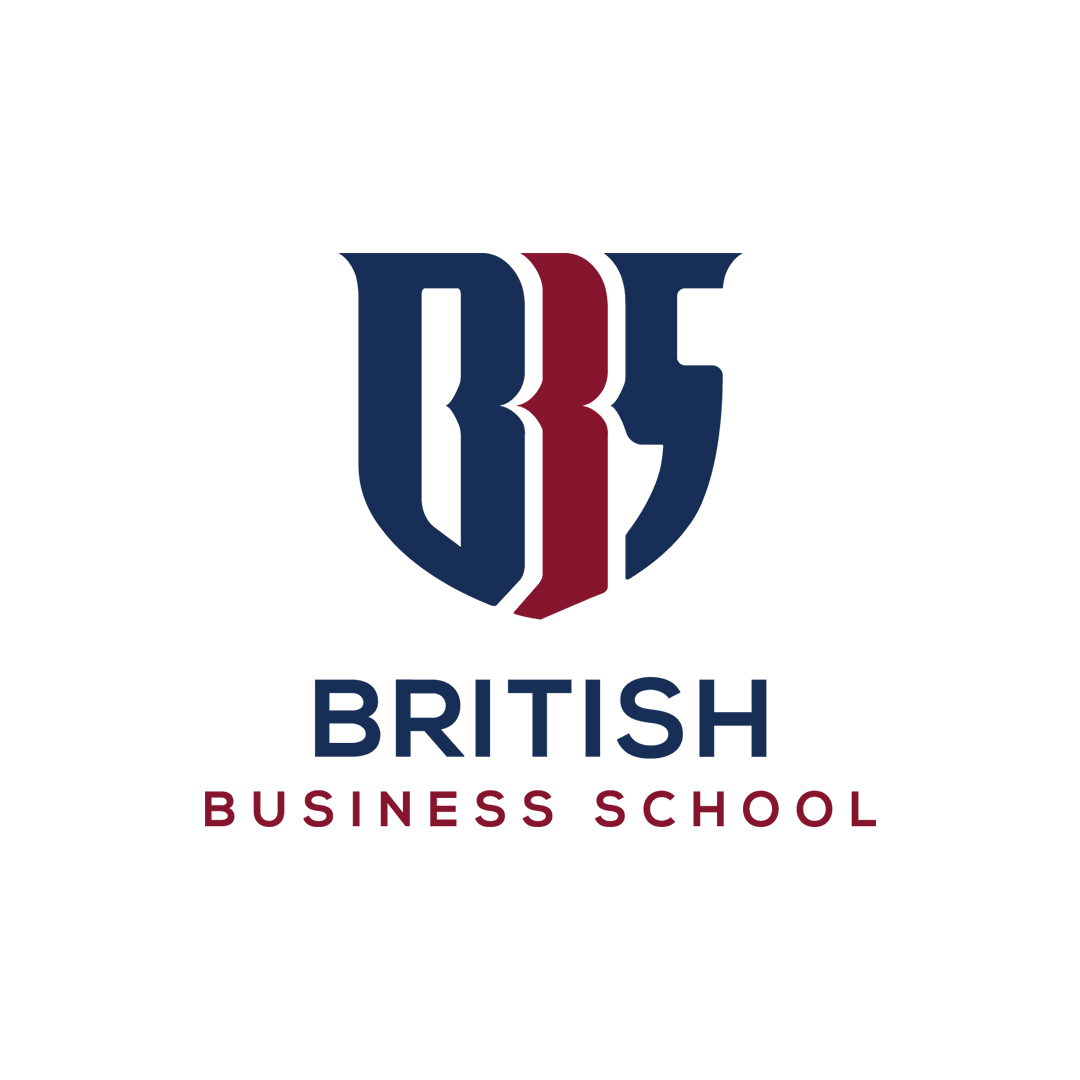

BRITISH BUSINESS SCHOOL s.r.o. is an educational institution providing professional management education in the BBA, MBA, DBA and LLM programmes. It was founded in 2010 and located in Prague 1, Czech Republic.

== Studies ==
The professional programs are taught in Czech, take one year and are divided into two semesters. The study is conducted in both blended and online formats. Self-study through e-learning is complemented by weekend seminars.

== Master of Business Administration (MBA) ==
The MBA program consists of 10 modules (courses), divided into two semesters with 5 modules each. In both semesters, two seminars are held. The program concludes with a final thesis, defended in front of a three-party committee. The institution offers 16 programs in blended format and 14 online. The available programs include Management and Leadership, Healthcare Management, Soft Skills Management, Financial Management and Accounting, Sales Management, Strategic Management, Marketing and Public Relations, International Relations and European Studies, Human Resources Management, Public Administration Management, Private Law, Real Estate, as well as the newest programs in Entrepreneurship and Innovation, or Sociology and Psychology. The offer also includes a Management & Leadership program taught in English.

== Bachelor of Business Administration (BBA) ==
The BBA program consists of 7 modules (courses), divided into two semesters with four modules in the first and three modules in the second one. At the end of the studies, students complete a final thesis. The program focuses on theoretical knowledge of the basic areas of management and can also be considered as a preparatory phase for the MBA. Currently, 4 programs are available in blended format and 3 online. These include Fundamentals of Management, Management and Leadership, Management in Social Services, and the English program Fundamentals of Management.

== Doctor of Business Administration (DBA) ==
The DBA program consists of 8 modules, divided into two semesters with 4 modules each. At the end of the studies, students submit a final thesis. This study program is intended for senior managers and focuses on business management, current trends, and innovative solutions.

== Master of Laws (LLM) ==
The LLM program consists of 10 modules, divided into two semesters with 5 modules each. In both semesters, two seminars are held. At the end of the studies, students prepare a final thesis, defended in front of a three-party committee. The program focuses on deepening knowledge in the field of private law, with a specialization in commercial law.

== Accreditation and memberships ==
The school programmes are accredited by Ministry of the Interior of the Czech Republic and the school is a member of educational and economic associations:

- International Education Society (IES)
- Accreditation Council for Business Schools and Programs
- International Association for Distance Learning
- European Association for International Education
- European Association for Business Studies
- British Chamber of Commerce
- Czech Chamber of Commerce
