= Tsediso Michael Makoelle =

South African academic

Tsediso Michael Makoelle is a South African academic and professor of leadership and inclusive education, currently the Dean of the Faculty of Education at the University of Fort Hare. He served as Vice Dean for Research and Full Professor at the Graduate School of Education, Nazarbayev University, Kazakhstan. His research focuses on inclusive education, teacher leadership, and educational management in both African and international contexts.

== Early life and education ==
Makoelle holds a Doctor of Philosophy (PhD) in Inclusive Education from the University of Manchester and a Doctor of Education (D.Ed.) in Education Management and Leadership from the University of South Africa (UNISA). He was a recipient of the Nelson Mandela Scholarship to the United Kingdom.

== Career ==
Makoelle has held academic and research positions in several institutions and has over three decades of experience in teaching and research. He is currently the Dean of the Faculty of Education at the University of Fort Hare. He served as Vice Dean for Research at Nazarbayev University Graduate School of Education.

He has been affiliated as a visiting research fellow at the International Laboratory for Social Integration Research at the National Research University Higher School of Economics, Moscow.

His academic work has focused on inclusive education policy, teacher leadership, and curriculum development, particularly in the Global South.

== Research and publications ==
Makoelle has authored and edited scholarly works on inclusive education across Africa and internationally. He has contributed to peer-reviewed journals and edited academic books published by Springer Nature.

His research includes studies on teacher leadership, inclusive pedagogy, and mentoring in teacher education.

== Selected publications ==
- Makoelle, T.M. (2020). "Teacher leadership in South African schools". International Journal of Management in Education. 14 (3) 107056: 293–310. doi:10.1504/IJMIE.2020.107056.
- Makoelle, T.M., Kozlova, M. & Iarskaia-Smirnova, E. (2024) Inclusive Education in Russia: Scoping International and Local Relevance Springer Publishers ISBN 978-3-031-57699-7
- Makoelle, T.M. & Burmistrova, V. (2021). Teacher education and inclusive education in Kazakhstan, International Journal of Inclusive Education
- Makoelle, T.M. (2025). "Mentoring of pre-service teachers as a method of enhancing effective inclusive teaching". South African Journal of Education. doi:10.15700/saje.v45n4a2700.
- Hlalele, D.; Makoelle, T.M., eds. (2023). Inclusion in Southern African Education. Springer.
- Makoelle, T.M.; Chataika, T., eds. (2025). Towards Inclusive Education in Zimbabwe. Springer.
- Makoelle, T.M. (2021). Inclusive Education in a Post-Soviet Context: A Case of Kazakhstan. Springer.

== Awards and honours ==
- Nelson Mandela Scholarship (United Kingdom)
- Global Education Leadership Award, Education 2.0, Dubai (2022)
- Service Medal, Ministry of Education and Science of Kazakhstan (2023)
- Recognition letter from the President of Kazakhstan (2017)

== Editorial roles ==
- Member of editorial boards of international academic journals
- Guest editor of special issues, including journals published by Springer (e.g., Discover Education)
- Peer reviewer for international scholarly journals
- Reviewer of research grant applications for the South African National Research Foundation (NRF)
