= Czech College =

College in Prague, Czech Republic

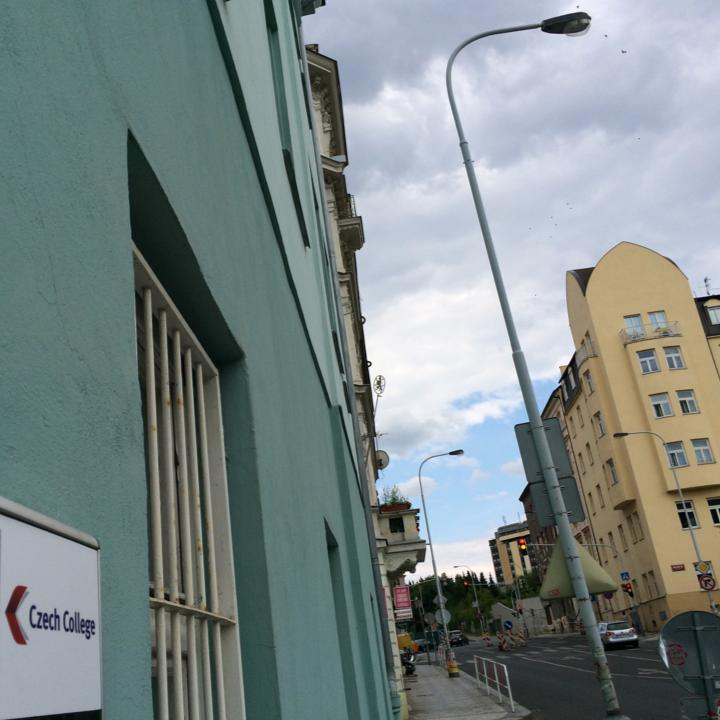
- Motto: The First Business School in Prague with a Global Focus
- Type: Private
- Established: 2013
- Affiliations: ATHE www.athe.co.uk
- President: John Xavier
- Academic staff: School of Business; School of Technology
- Administrative staff: 25
- Students: 130+
- Location: Prague, Czech Republic; 50°5′8.55″N 14°27′17.43″E
- Campus: Urban
- Colours: Red and Blue
- Website: www.czechcollege.cz

Czech College is a further education institute located in Žižkov, Prague, Czech Republic, approved by the Ministry of Education, Youth and Sports. The college is partnered with the University of Northampton to deliver selected programs in Prague. The college runs undergraduate and postgraduate programs from four separate schools, and has approximately 130+ students, of which 90% are international.

== Organisation and structure ==
Czech College offers undergraduate and postgraduate programs. The college is organised into four schools:

- The School of Business, offering courses in Business Management and Strategic Management, based on the British curriculum and accredited by ATHE.
- The School of Technology, which opened in early 2016, offering two degree programs in Web Development & e-Business and Digital communication.
- The School of Healthcare, offering an adaptation program for international nursing students, entitled 'Nurses Adaptation Program with PGDHCM'.
- The School of Language Studies, offering a Foundation Diploma in English Language and Czech to local students. It also provides IELTS training.

== Accreditation and research collaboration ==
Czech College is approved by the Ministry of Education, Youth and Sports as a European University operating in the Czech Republic. The college is partnered with the University of Northampton, and is also accredited by ATHE (Awards for Training and Higher Education), a British exam board, and has academic collaborations with Turnov Nursing School.

The college is a member of the Czech Chapter of the British Chambers of Commerce, and the European Association for International Education (EAIE).

Czech College is a study partner organisation in the European Commission's Erasmus + virtual education project Interactive Education in 360°.
