= Midlands Innovation =

- Formation: August 2012 (as M5); May 2016 (as Midlands Innovation)
- Type: Consortium of United Kingdom-based universities
- Region served: English Midlands
- Members: Aston University; University of Birmingham; University of Leicester; Keele University; Loughborough University; University of Nottingham; University of Warwick; Cranfield University
- Website: www.midlandsinnovation.org.uk

Midlands Innovation is a group of eight universities in the Midlands of England. It was formed (as M5) in August 2012 by the universities of Birmingham, Leicester, Loughborough, Nottingham and Warwick in order to boost equipment sharing between member institutions, following the success of the N8 Research Partnership. In December 2012 the group, which had added Aston University, launched its online equipment sharing database. In March 2015, Chancellor George Osborne announced that the Midlands Innovation universities would lead the £60 million Energy Research Accelerator project. The project was re-announced in April 2016 as a £180 million project comprising the £60 million previously announced from the UK government and £120 million from the private sector. The consortium was re-launched as Midlands Innovation in May 2016.

In 2023, the eight universities together co-founded and formed Midlands Mindforge, a patient capital investment company to focus on commercialising research in three key areas: life sciences, green technology, and deep tech. The company aims to raise £250 million from corporate partners, institutional investors and individuals.

== Universities ==
University	Undergraduate students (2024/25)	Postgraduate students (2024/25)	Total students (2024/25)	Total academic staff (2024/25)	Total income (2024/25, £ millions)	Research income (2024/25, £ millions)
West Midlands
Aston University	14,430	5,135	19,565	1,070	230	23
University of Birmingham	25,530	14,500	40,025	4,865	1,072	229
Keele University	9,990	3,695	13,680	945	213	24
University of Warwick	19,475	8,405	27,880	3,795	860	148
East Midlands
University of Leicester	14,675	4,315	18,990	1,995	395	85
Loughborough University	15,490	3,470	18,955	1,745	386	57
University of Nottingham	28,415	8,050	36,460	3,850	845	140
East of England
Cranfield University	455	4,550	5,000	790	205	50

== See also ==
- N8 Research Partnership
- Science and Engineering South
- GW4 Alliance
