= Association of Pacific Rim Universities =

Educational organization

- Partnering for the Pacific
- Abbreviation: APRU
- Formation: 1997; 29 years ago
- Founder: UC Berkeley, UCLA, California Institute of Technology (CALTECH) and the University of Southern California.
- Type: NGO
- Purpose: Educational Diplomacy
- Headquarters: Hong Kong
- Location: Association of Pacific Rim Universities (APRU) Unit 902, Cyberport 2, 100 Cyberport Road, Hong Kong
- Region served: Asia Pacific Rim
- Members: 64 research universities
- Chair: Professor Teck-Hua Ho, President, Nanyang Technological University
- Chief Executive: Professor Thomas Schneider
- Website: apru.org

The Association of Pacific Rim Universities (APRU) is a consortium of 64 universities in 20 economies of the Pacific Rim. Formed in 1997, APRU fosters collaboration between member universities, researchers, and policymakers contributing to economic, scientific and cultural advancement in the Pacific Rim. Its international secretariat is located at Cyberport in Hong Kong.

== Members ==
Country/Region	Institution
Australia	Adelaide University
Australia	Australian National University
Australia	University of Melbourne
Australia	University of Queensland
Australia	University of Sydney
Brunei	Universiti Brunei Darussalam
Canada	Simon Fraser University
Canada	University of British Columbia
Canada	University of Alberta
Chile	University of Chile
Chile	University of Concepción
China	Fudan University
China	Nanjing University
China	Peking University
China	Shanghai Jiao Tong University
China	Southern University of Science and Technology
China	Sun Yat-sen University
China	Tongji University
China	Tsinghua University
China	University of the Chinese Academy of Sciences
China	University of Science and Technology of China
China	Xi'an Jiaotong University
China	Zhejiang University
Ecuador	Universidad San Francisco de Quito
Hong Kong	Chinese University of Hong Kong
Hong Kong	Hong Kong University of Science and Technology
Hong Kong	University of Hong Kong
Indonesia	University of Indonesia
Japan	Keio University
Japan	Kyushu University
Japan	Nagoya University
Japan	University of Osaka
Japan	Tohoku University
Japan	Waseda University
Malaysia	University of Malaya
Mexico	Monterrey Institute of Technology and Higher Education
Mexico	National Autonomous University of Mexico
New Zealand	University of Auckland
Philippines	University of the Philippines (Note: A university system with a number of constituent universities)
Russia	Far Eastern Federal University
Singapore	Nanyang Technological University
Singapore	National University of Singapore
South Korea	Korea University
South Korea	KAIST
South Korea	Pohang University of Science and Technology
South Korea	Pusan National University
South Korea	Seoul National University
South Korea	Yonsei University
Taiwan	National Taiwan University
Taiwan	National Yang Ming Chiao Tung University
Thailand	Chulalongkorn University
United States	University of California, Davis
United States	University of California, Irvine
United States	University of California, Los Angeles
United States	University of California, Riverside
United States	University of California, San Diego
United States	University of California, Santa Barbara
United States	University of California, Santa Cruz
United States	University of Hawaiʻi at Mānoa
United States	University of Michigan
United States	University of Oregon
United States	University of Southern California
United States	University of Washington
Vietnam	VinUniversity

== Steering Committee ==
The Steering Committee is made up of 16 members, each of whom are chancellors, vice-chancellors or presidents of APRU universities, or staff from the APRU International Secretariat:

- Teck-Hua Ho, President, Nanyang Technological University; Chair, APRU
- Nancy Ip, President, Hong Kong University of Science and Technology; Vice-chair, APRU
- Kohei Itoh, President, Keio University
- Kuiling Ding, President, Shanghai Jiao Tong University
- Joy Johnson, President and Vice-Chancellor, Simon Fraser University
- David Garza, President, Tecnológico de Monterrey
- Deborah Terry AO, Vice-Chancellor and President, University of Queensland
- Mark Scott AO, Vice-Chancellor and President, The University of Sydney
- Noor Azuan Abu Osman, Vice-Chancellor, Universiti Malaya
- Gary May, Chancellor, University of California, Davis
- Pradeep Khosla, Chancellor, University of California, San Diego
- Angelo A. Jimenez, President, University of the Philippines
- Diego Quiroga, Rector, Universidad San Francisco de Quito
- Dong-Sup Yoon, President, Yonsei University
- Thomas Schneider, Chief Executive
- Albert Chan, Chief Operating Officer

== APRU Ambassador ==
- Gene Block – Former Chancellor, UCLA
- Rocky Tuan – Former Vice-Chancellor and President, The Chinese University of Hong Kong

== International Secretariat ==
Headed by the Chief Executive, the APRU International Secretariat coordinates the agenda and programs of APRU. The Secretariat also plays an instrumental role in driving APRU's communications and global outreach. The Secretariat is currently based in Hong Kong and located at the Cyberport.

- Prof. Thomas Schneider, Chief Executive
- Albert Chan, Director of Administration and Finance
- Christina Maria Schönleber, Chief Strategy Officer
- Adriana Rojas, Senior Director, Networks and Students Programs
- Benjamin Zhou, Program Manager
- David Guillermo Quimbayo G., Program Officer
- Jackie Wong, Director, Communications and Engagement
- Joey Chu, Senior Manager, Events
- Vini Damayanti, Communications and Administrative Officer
- Eric Chu, Executive Manager
- Ellen Yau, Manager of Administration and Finance

== See also ==
- List of higher education associations and alliances
