= Qiu Yong =

Chinese chemist

- 邱勇
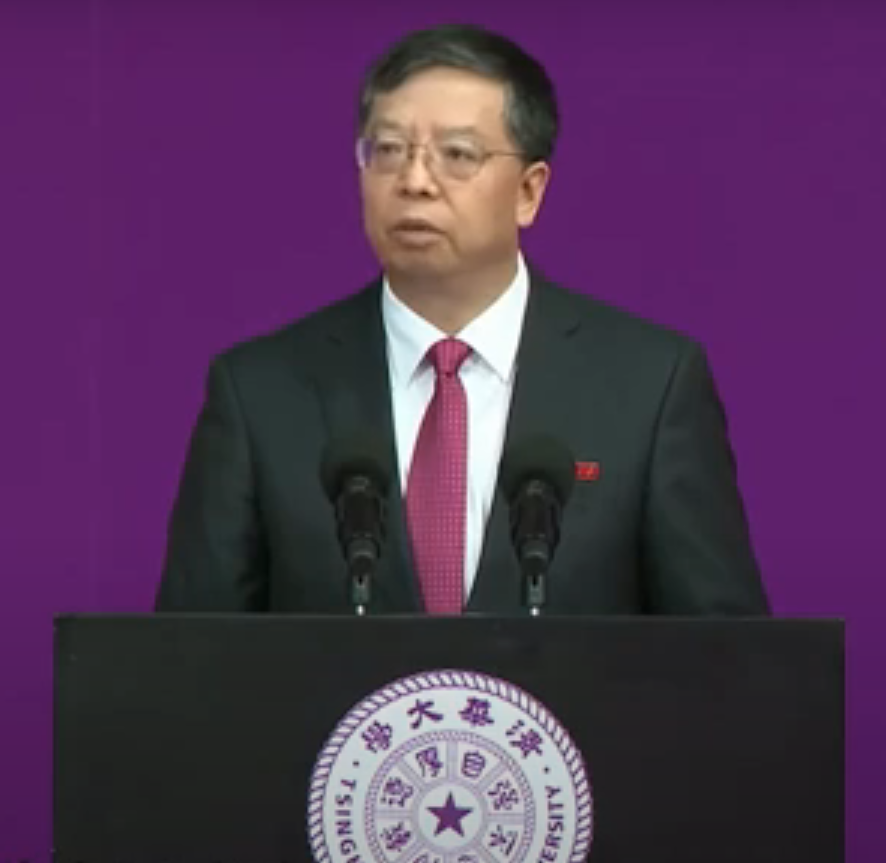

Communist Party Secretary of Tsinghua University
- Incumbent
- Assumed office February 2022
- Preceded by: Chen Xu

President of Tsinghua University
- In office March 2015 – February 2022
- Preceded by: Chen Jining
- Succeeded by: Wang Xiqin

Personal details
- Born: July 28, 1964 (age 62) Rong County, Sichuan, China
- Party: Chinese Communist Party
- Education: Tsinghua University (BS, DSc)

Qiu Yong (Chinese: 邱勇; pinyin: Qiū Yǒng; born 28 July 1964) is a Chinese chemist. He is the current party secretary of Tsinghua University. Qiu is a member of the Chinese Academy of Sciences.

== Early life and education ==
Qiu was born and raised in Rong County, Sichuan.

Qiu received a Bachelor of Science and a Doctor of Science in chemistry from Tsinghua University in 1988 and 1994, respectively.

== Career ==
After the completion of his doctorate, Qiu joined Tsinghua University as a faculty member.

Qiu served as director of the Department of Chemistry and deputy dean of the School of Sciences, Tsinghua University. He served as vice president in December 2009, and in March 2015 he became president of Tsinghua University.

He was honored as a Distinguished Young Scholar by the National Science Fund for Distinguished Young Scholars (Chinese: 国家杰出青年科学基金) in 2003.

He was awarded as a Chang Jiang Scholar by the Chinese Ministry of Education in 2006.

He was elected as a fellow of the Chinese Academy of Sciences in 2013. In March 2018, he was appointed deputy director of the National People's Congress Education, Science, Culture and Public Health Committee.

In February 2022, he was appointed party secretary of Tsinghua University.

== Award ==
- 2011 First Award for National Technical Invention

== Notes ==
Educational offices
Preceded by Chen Jining	President of Tsinghua University; 2015–2022	Succeeded by Wang Xiqin
Party political offices
Preceded by Chen Xu	Communist Party Secretary of Tsinghua University; 2022–present	Incumbent
