= University of Yangon =

Public university in Myanmar

- ရန်ကုန်တက္ကသိုလ် IPA: [jàɰ̃ɡòʊɰ̃ tɛʔkəθò]
- Seal of the University of Yangon
- Former names: University of Rangoon (1920–1964); Rangoon Arts and Sciences University (1964–1989)
- Motto: နတ္ထိ ဝိဇ္ဇာ သမံ မိတ္တံ (Pali: Natthi vijjā samaṃ mittaṃ)
- Motto in English: There is no friend like knowledge
- Type: Public
- Established: 1920 December 01; 105 years ago
- Affiliations: ASEAN University Network (AUN); Asian Universities Alliance (AUA); Silk-road Universities Network (SUN)
- Rector: Dr. Thaung Htike
- Faculty: 440 (As of 2022-2023 AY)
- Undergraduates: 2,220 (As of 2022-2023 AY)
- Postgraduates: 603 (As of 2022-2023 AY)
- Location: Kamayut Township, Yangon, Yangon Region, Myanmar; 16°49′48″N 96°08′06″E
- Campus: Urban
- Website: uy.edu.mm

The University of Yangon (also known as Yangon University; Burmese: ရန်ကုန်တက္ကသိုလ်, pronounced [jàɰ̃ɡòʊɰ̃ tɛʔkəθò]; formerly the University of Rangoon and Rangoon Arts and Sciences University) is a public university in Yangon, Myanmar. Located in Kamayut Township on the southwestern bank of Inya Lake, it is the country's oldest university and celebrated its centenary in 2020.

The university originated in Rangoon College and Judson College and was established under the University of Rangoon Act 1920. Modelled in part on British universities, it became closely associated with Burmese nationalism, and student strikes at the university in 1920, 1936, and 1938 were significant events in the country's anti-colonial movement. In the 1950s, the University of Rangoon was regarded as one of the leading universities in Asia.

After the 1962 Burmese coup d'état, the university was reorganised as Rangoon Arts and Sciences University, stripped of its autonomy, and its faculties were separated into specialised institutions. Its campus remained a focal point of political protest, including during the 1962 Rangoon University protests, the U Thant funeral crisis, and the 8888 Uprising. Undergraduate programmes were suspended from 1996 for sixteen years before the university began to gradually reopen after the political reforms of the 2010s.

The university now comprises 21 departments and the Universities' Research Centre, and offers undergraduate, honours, master's, diploma, and doctoral programmes. Its campus is noted for such landmarks as the Convocation Hall, Judson Church, and the historic students' union site. Among its alumni are numerous prominent political and intellectual figures, including Aung San, U Nu, Ba Maw, U Thant, and several presidents and prime ministers of Myanmar.

== History ==
=== Founding and early history ===
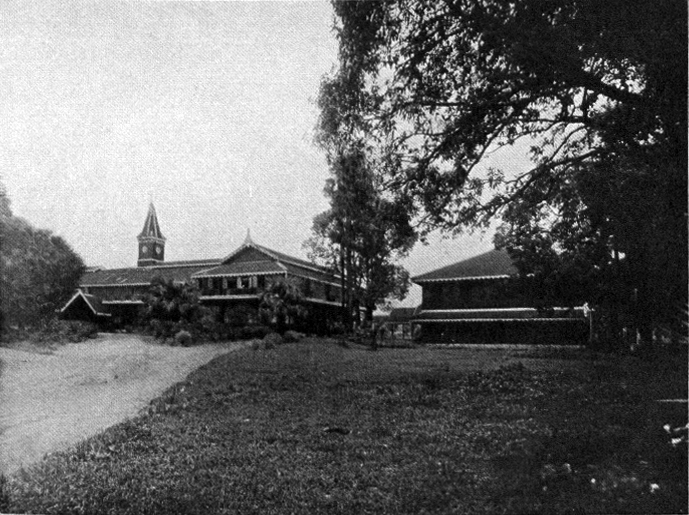
Rangoon College in the early 1900s, before it merged with Judson College

The University of Yangon originated in Rangoon College and Judson College. In 1884, the British government established the Education Syndicate as part of its plan to found Rangoon College as an affiliated college of the University of Calcutta. Management of the college was entrusted to the syndicate in 1885–1886 under the Company Acts. In 1904, the institution was renamed Government College, Rangoon, and placed under direct government supervision. Judson College was founded by the American Baptist Mission as Rangoon Karen College on 28 May 1878, and was later renamed Baptist College before becoming Judson College. On 1 December 1920, the University of Rangoon was established with two constituent colleges, University College and Judson College; it is the oldest university in Myanmar. In response to demands from the Young Men's Buddhist Association (YMBA), one of the leading political organisations of the time, the University of Rangoon was established under the University of Rangoon Act 1920. Its first chancellor was the Governor of British Burma, Sir Reginald Craddock, and the university opened with an enrolment of 829 students. The landscaping was supervised by Sir Harcourt Butler, and the buildings were inspired by the universities of Oxford and Cambridge. Its budget was funded by officially recognised casinos, known as our-day, across the country.

The first student strike, organised by a committee of 26 students in support of 16 demands, took place on 5 December 1920 in protest against restrictions that disadvantaged children from middle- and lower-class families. The movement marked the beginning of Burma's independence movement and is commemorated as the country's National Day. As a result of the strike, the University Act was amended in 1924 to allow the university to affiliate institutions elsewhere in Burma. On 4 July 1925, Mandalay Intermediate College became the first affiliated college; after independence, it developed into Mandalay University. By 1930, the university had added the Teachers' Training College and the Medical College as constituent colleges; the Agricultural College was added in 1938. The second student strike occurred on 21 February 1936 after the president of the Rangoon University Students' Union (RUSU), U Nu, was expelled for publicly criticising the college principal. Another strike took place in 1938 over delays in amending the University Act. Later that year, students joined a nationwide strike by students and workers known as the 1300 Revolution. During a protest on 20 December 1938, a college student, Bo Aung Kyaw, was killed. In 1939, an amended University Act provided for an elected chancellor, and Pe Maung Tin became the first Burmese chancellor.

=== World War II and post-independence period ===
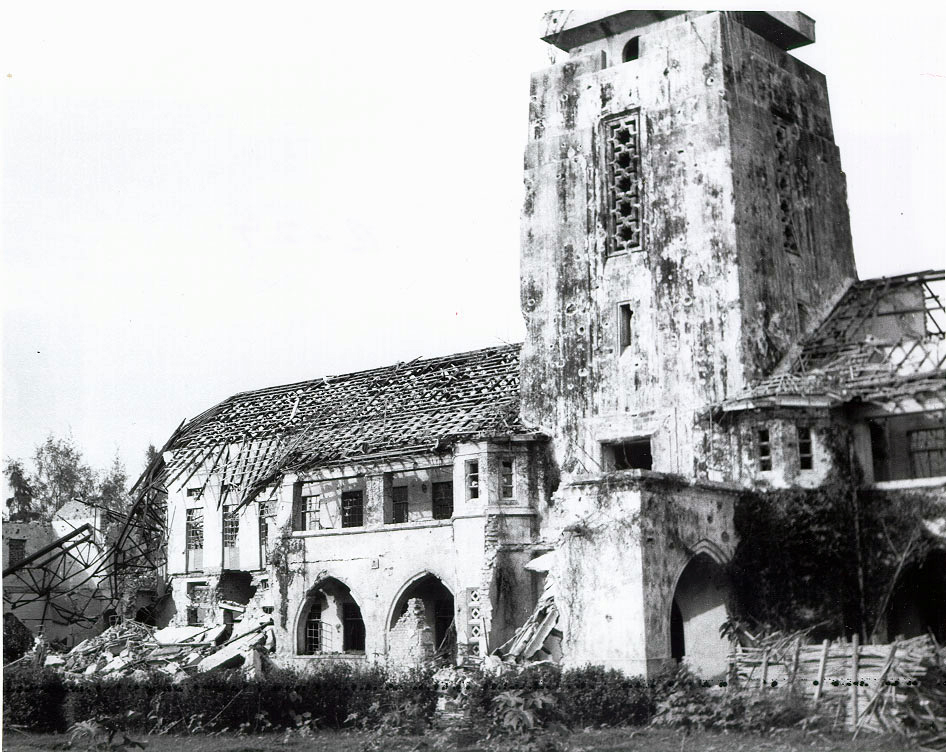
The university suffered damage during World War II

As Burma came under Japanese occupation following the outbreak of the Second World War, the university was closed on 15 January 1942 and reopened on 1 August 1943 as the State University under Ba Maw's government, with Pe Maung Tin serving as university president. After the British reoccupied the country, the university became an Interim University in 1946. Following the war, its colleges were reorganised on a unitary basis into the faculties of Arts, Science, Law, Medical Science, Education, and Engineering, with Agriculture, Social Science, and Forestry added later. Htin Aung was appointed the university's first rector.

After independence, Mandalay Intermediate College became Mandalay University College as an affiliated institution of Rangoon University, and ultimately attained separate university status in 1958. Other intermediate colleges were established throughout the country: Moulmein in 1953; Kyaukpyu in 1954; Yankin, Hteedan, and Magwe in 1955; and Bassein in 1958. The Defence Services Academy in Bahtoo Station was moved to Pyin Oo Lwin in 1955 and placed under the university.

During this period, the University of Rangoon was regarded as one of the leading universities in Asia, and collaborated with American universities in business administration and with Soviet institutions in engineering.

=== Under military rule ===
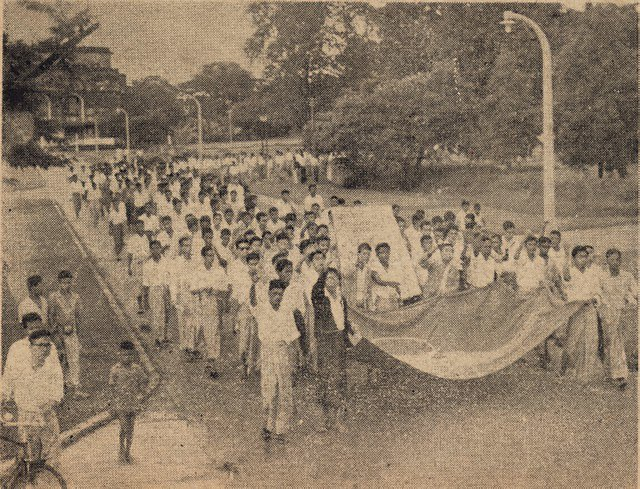
7 July 1962 peaceful march from Convocation Hall on Chancellor Road

Following the 1962 military coup led by Ne Win, the university was renamed Rangoon Arts and Sciences University (RASU) in 1964. The new socialist government placed it under the central control of the Directorate of Higher Education, abolished its autonomy, and separated its faculties from the parent institution to re-establish them as smaller universities, including the institutes of Medicine, Education, Technology, and Economics. The purpose of this reorganisation was to prevent the emergence of student agitation against the regime by placing students under the close supervision of subject-based institutions, whose teachers were made responsible for maintaining order and discipline on each campus. Thereafter, the practice by which a senior government official served as chancellor came to an end; the last chancellor was Colonel Hla Han, the minister for education and health.

On 7 July 1962, a student uprising broke out in protest against 22 newly introduced hostel rules that restricted students’ political activities; dozens of students were shot during the protest, and the students’ union building was destroyed the following morning. In 1989, the State Law and Order Restoration Council renamed the institution the University of Yangon under the Adaptation of Expressions Law. After the university had repeatedly served as a focal point of anti-government protest, including during the U Thant funeral crisis in 1974 and the 8888 Uprising in 1988, undergraduate programmes were suspended from 1996, and only postgraduate and diploma courses were offered for sixteen years, in order to prevent the university from again becoming a threat to the military regime’s supremacy.

=== Post-2011 reforms ===
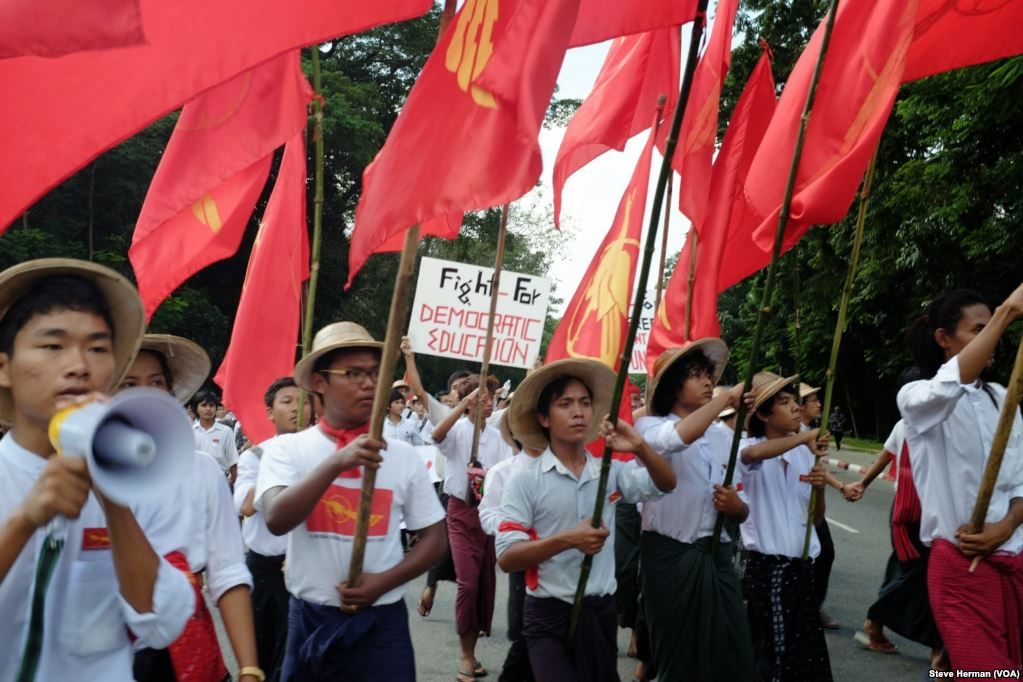
Students protesting at Yangon University in 2014

Aung San Suu Kyi, then an opposition leader and member of parliament, proposed the drafting of a new university law and the upgrading and renovation of the University of Yangon (main campus) on 27 November 2012. Although the then minister of education opposed the formation of a separate committee, the proposal passed the Hluttaw with 248 votes in favour. The Yangon University Upgrading and Restoration Committee was subsequently formed, with Aung San Suu Kyi as its chair.

The university reopened its main campus to undergraduate classes in December 2013 and the Hlaing campus in 2017. Since its reopening, the university has been designated a centre of excellence (CoE), and it regained its autonomy in 2020 together with 15 other universities.

On 18 November 2014, students protested against the National Education Bill introduced by Thein Sein's government, opposing what they saw as its overly centralised approach to education. As a result, a bill amending the National Education Law was passed by the Hluttaw, and teachers' and students' unions were legally recognised.

The university celebrated its centenary in 2020, with the ceremony opened by Aung San Suu Kyi in her capacity as chair of the Steering Committee to Hold the Centenary of Yangon University. At the committee's first meeting in 2019, she expressed her hope that the university would restore its former stature and surpass it.

== Campus ==
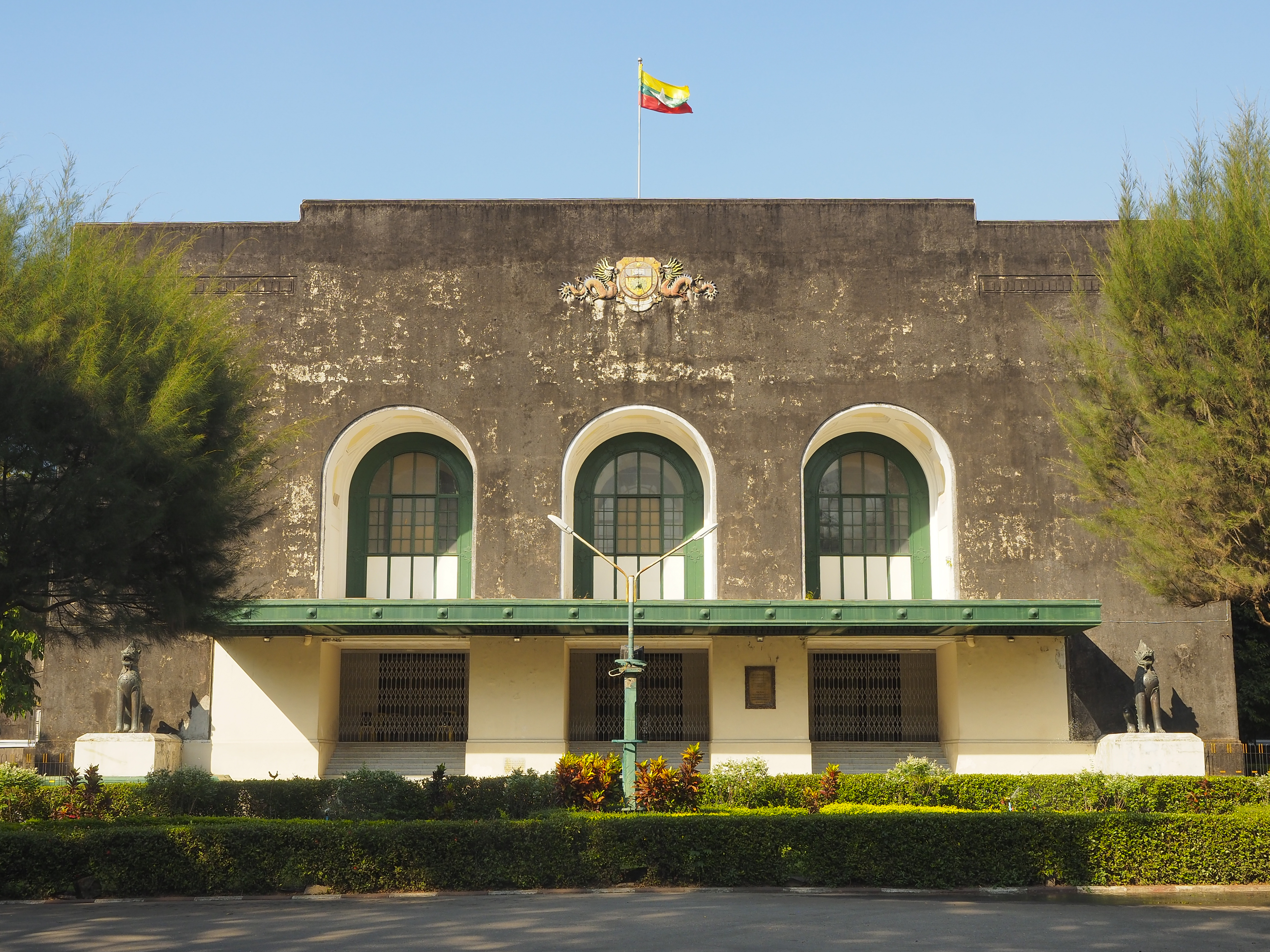
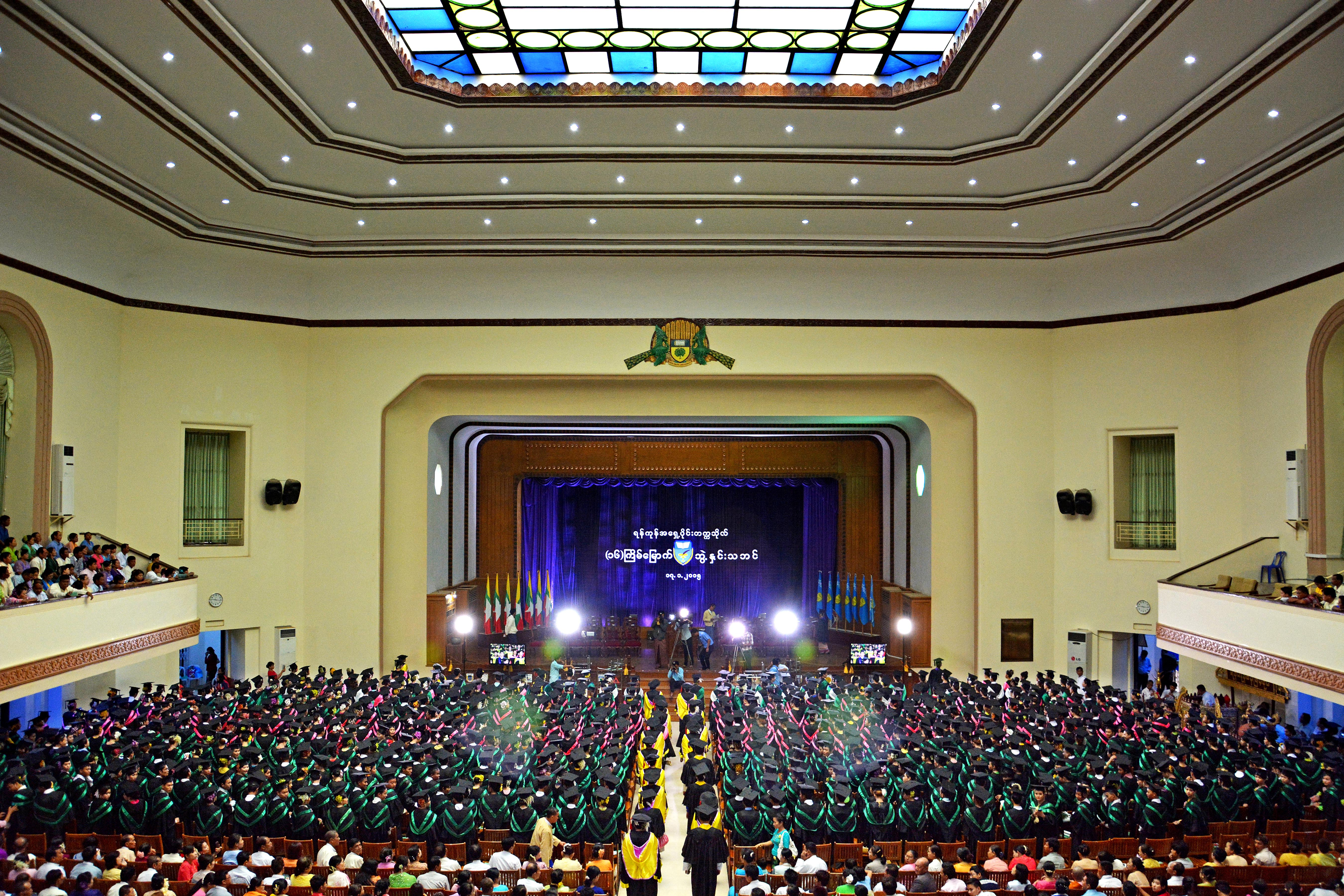
The Convocation Hall

The University of Yangon is located in Kamayut Township, Yangon, on the southwestern bank of Inya Lake, bounded by Inya Road to the east and north, University Avenue Road to the south, and Pyay Road to the west. The Hlaing campus lies slightly north of the main campus and is used for first-year classes. It opened in 1977 as No. 2 Regional College of Rangoon and, in 1981, became the university's Hlaing campus for natural science courses. From 2000, the campus was used solely as a Basic Education School for Teacher Training until it reopened in 2017.

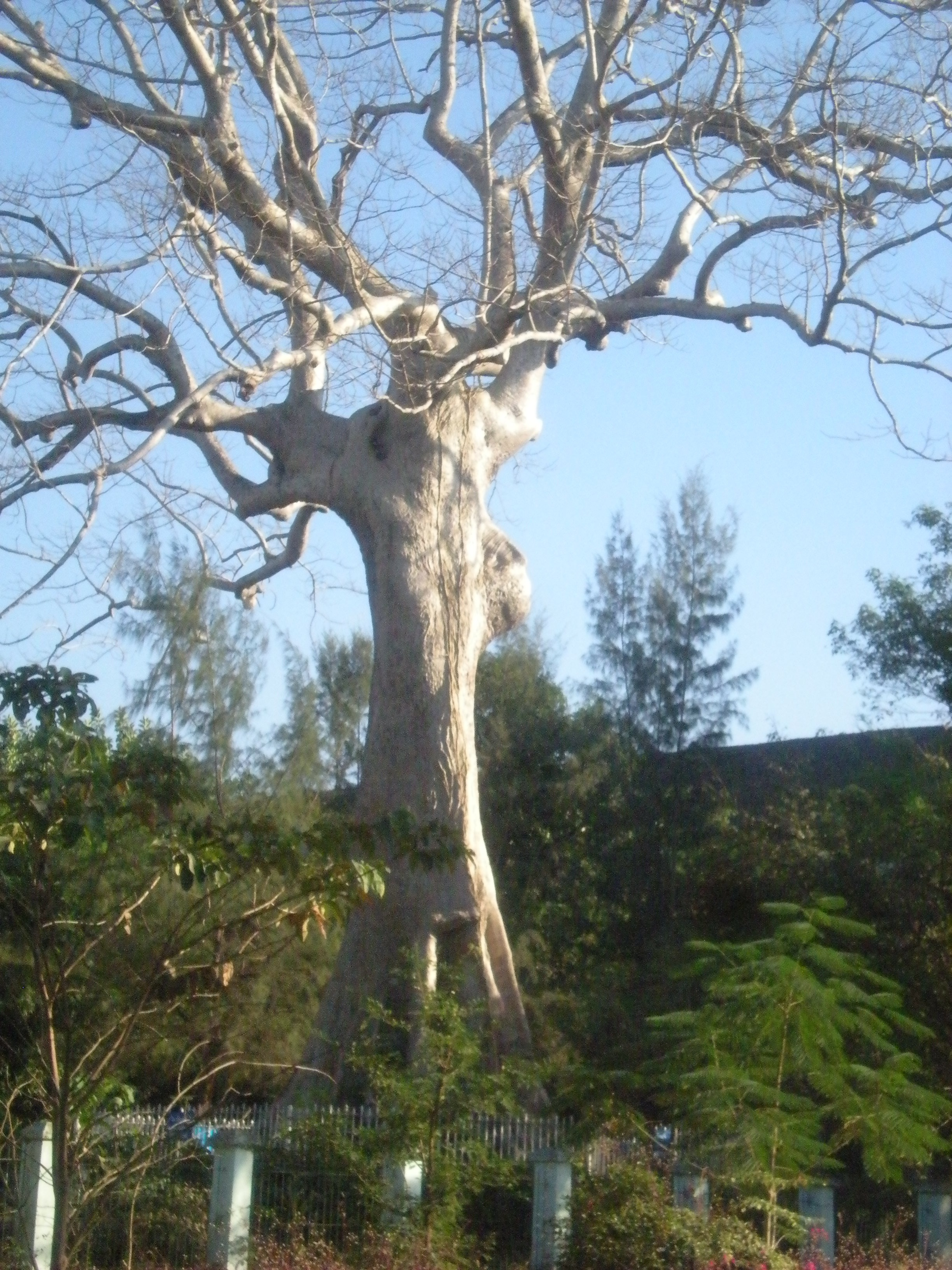
The thitpok tree on Yangon University's main campus

The first building constructed on the main campus was the Convocation Hall, whose foundation stone was laid on 22 December 1922, although the first convocation ceremony had been held at Jubilee Hall in 1921. The hall was officially opened on 28 July 1931 during the 11th convocation ceremony, and subsequent convocation ceremonies have been held there. Near the Convocation Hall stands a large thitpok (Tetrameles nudiflora) tree that has stood there since the university's founding in 1920. It received the 32nd Blue Plaque from the Yangon Heritage Trust, becoming the first natural heritage site to be so recognised.

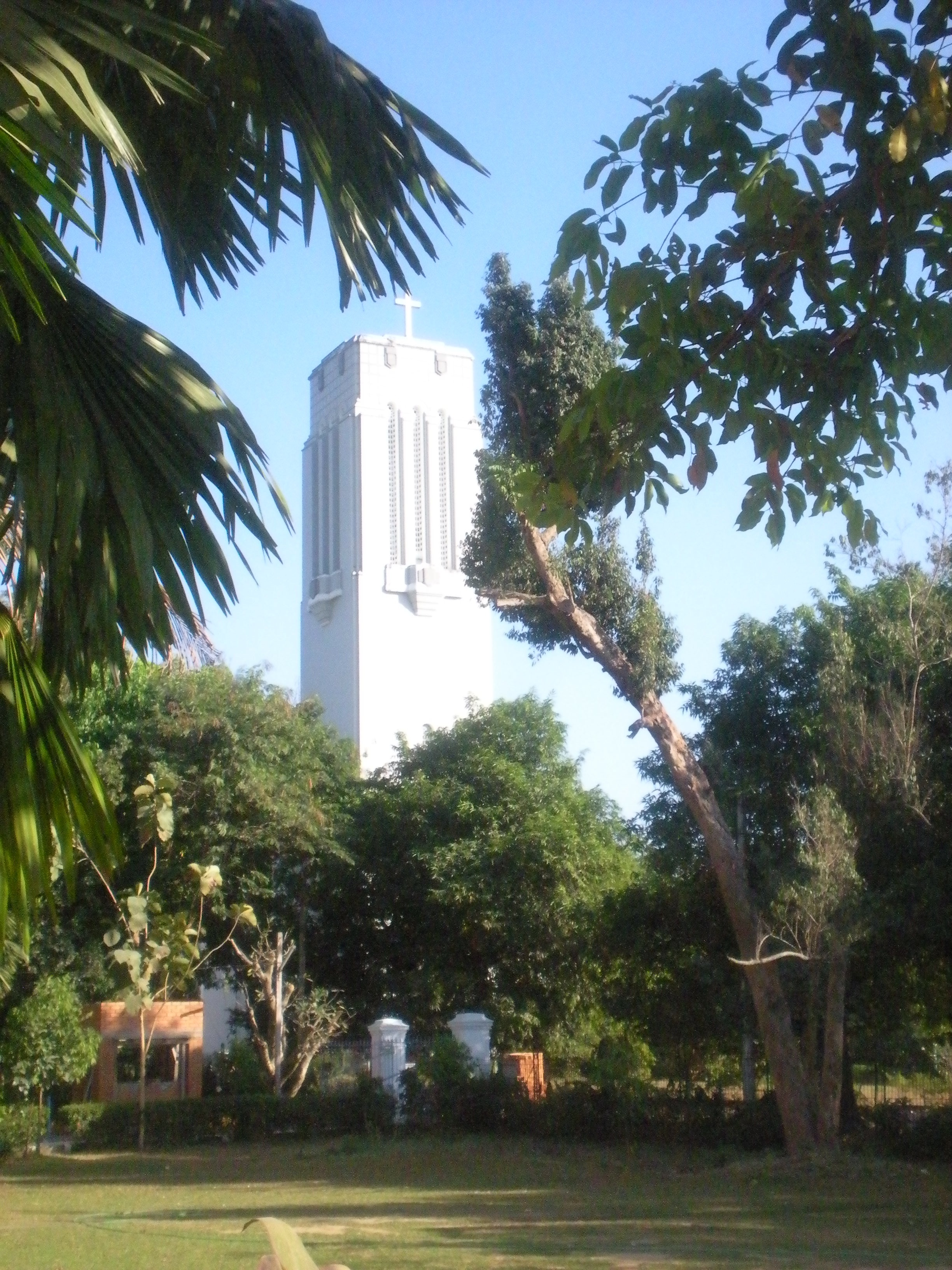
The Judson Tower

On the Pyay Road side of the campus stands Judson Church, named after Adoniram Judson, the American missionary credited with bringing Christianity to Burma. Its cornerstone was laid on 27 July 1931 by Chancellor Sir Charles Alexander Innes, and its bell tower is reached by a 180-step ladder. Nearby is the two-storey Recreation Centre (RC), which includes a stadium, restaurants, and a room for the university art association. The building combines Burmese and modern architectural styles and was designed in the late 1950s by an American architect in collaboration with Sithu U Tin, with funding from the Asia Foundation.

To commemorate the university's diamond jubilee, the military government constructed Diamond Jubilee Hall at a cost of 63,000,000 kyat, and the hall later hosted Barack Obama during his visit to Burma.

By 1928, the university had completed five hostels, named after the historic regions of Ava, Sagaing, Pinya, Bago, and Thaton. Bago Hall is best known as the residence of General Aung San, who lived in room 113 on the third floor, which is now preserved separately as the Aung San Room.

The main campus houses two libraries: the Yangon University Library and the Universities' Central Library (UCL). The foundation stone of the Yangon University Library was laid on 8 December 1927 by Sir Harcourt Butler, and the library officially opened in 1931 at the corner of Chancellor Road and Sagaing Road. In 1964, the library was transferred to the Department of Higher Education and renamed the Universities' Central Library. In 1973, a new building for the UCL was constructed next to the original building, which regained its original name. The three-storey new building was designed by Khin Maung Lwin, a grandson of Sithu U Tin, and construction was completed in 1993.

== Administration and departments ==
The university is governed by a leadership board comprising the rector; pro-rectors for academic affairs, administrative and financial services, and institutional development at both the main and Hlaing campuses; a pro-rector serving at the Ministry of Education; the heads of engineering, administration, and finance; the registrar; the university librarian; and the heads of academic departments. The rector is Thaung Htike, and, as of 2025, the university has six pro-rectors. Its affiliated institutions are the National Management Degree College and the Nationalities Youth Resource Development Degree College, Yangon.

The university comprises 21 departments in the disciplines of Myanmar, English, Geography, History, Psychology, Philosophy, Law, Oriental Studies, International Relations and Political Science, Anthropology, Archaeology, Library and Information Studies, Chemistry, Physics, Mathematics, Zoology, Botany, Geology, Computer Studies, Industrial Chemistry, and Environment and Water Studies. Each department admits up to 50 students. It also includes the Universities' Research Centre (URC), established in 1985, and has maintained a University Training Corps (UTC) since 1922.

The university is a member of the ASEAN University Network (AUN), the Asian Universities Alliance (AUA), and the Silk-road Universities Network (SUN).

== Academics ==
Admission to the University of Yangon is based on performance in the Matriculation Examination and criteria set by the university's own council rather than by the Department of Higher Education. Students must hold a High School Completion Certificate, and those admitted to undergraduate programmes begin specialising in their first year. Most first degrees take four years to complete, while law degrees take five. The university is also one of the few universities in Myanmar to offer doctoral study. In addition to undergraduate education, it offers honours, master's, diploma, and PhD programmes, each with its own academic and admission requirements, as well as separate registration procedures for international students.

The university has also awarded honorary doctorates in literature and law; the first recipient in literature was Ledi Sayadaw. After independence, the Burmese government awarded honorary doctorates in law to foreign leaders, including King Sihanouk of Cambodia, Marshal Tito of Yugoslavia, Ho Chi Minh of Vietnam, and David Ben-Gurion of Israel. The practice ceased in 1962 and resumed in 2003, when such degrees were again conferred on recipients including Sitagu Sayadaw; between 1921 and 2020, a total of 72 people received honorary doctorates from the university. In February 2026, the university awarded Min Aung Hlaing, the country's military leader since 2021, an honorary doctorate in public administration, prompting public criticism.

== Students' union ==
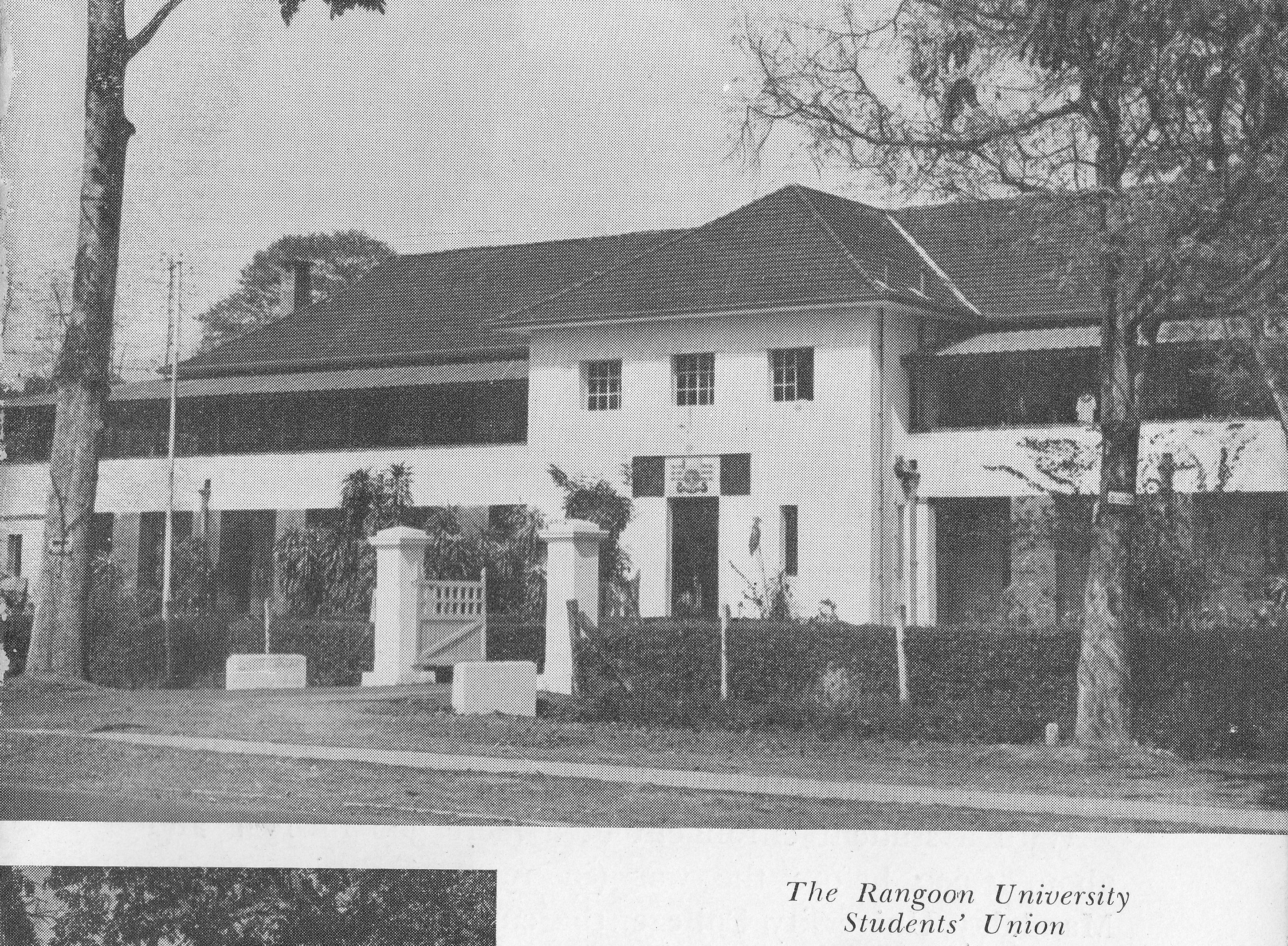
Last known photo of the Rangoon University Students' Union building

The original purpose of the students' union under the University Act 1920 was to enable students to participate in debates and other student activities, modelled on those at Oxford and Cambridge. The union building was completed on 17 November 1930, and the union itself was formally established on 31 January 1931. Its first president was Tun Sein and its last was Ba Swe Lay; U Nu, who later became the first prime minister of Burma, also served as president of the union. The formation of the union has been described as influential in Burma's independence movement, as student members including U Nu and Aung San later joined the nationalist organisation Dobama Asiayone.

After independence, the union became increasingly involved in political activity and came into conflict with Ne Win's government in the lead-up to the 1962 coup. The union building was blown up on the morning after the 7th July Student Uprising.

After the political reforms of the 2010s and the reopening of the university, a new students' union was re-established in December 2014 with an initial membership of 17 students. In 2017, more than 50 years after the building's destruction, the government led by Aung San Suu Kyi began planning its reconstruction, but the project was ultimately left unfinished because of disagreements between different generations over the reconstruction plans.

== Notable people ==
Alumni of the university have played significant roles in the political history of Myanmar. Its alumni include seven presidents of the country—Win Maung, Ne Win, San Yu, Maung Maung, Htin Kyaw, Win Myint and Min Aung Hlaing —and six prime ministers: U Nu, Ba Swe, Ne Win, Maung Maung Kha, Khin Nyunt, and Min Aung Hlaing. Among its other notable alumni are Aung San, a leading figure in Burma's independence movement and founder of the country's armed forces; Ba Maw, premier of Burma from 1937 to 1939 and head of state during the Japanese-backed State of Burma (1943–1945); and U Thant, who served as the third secretary-general of the United Nations from 1961 to 1971.

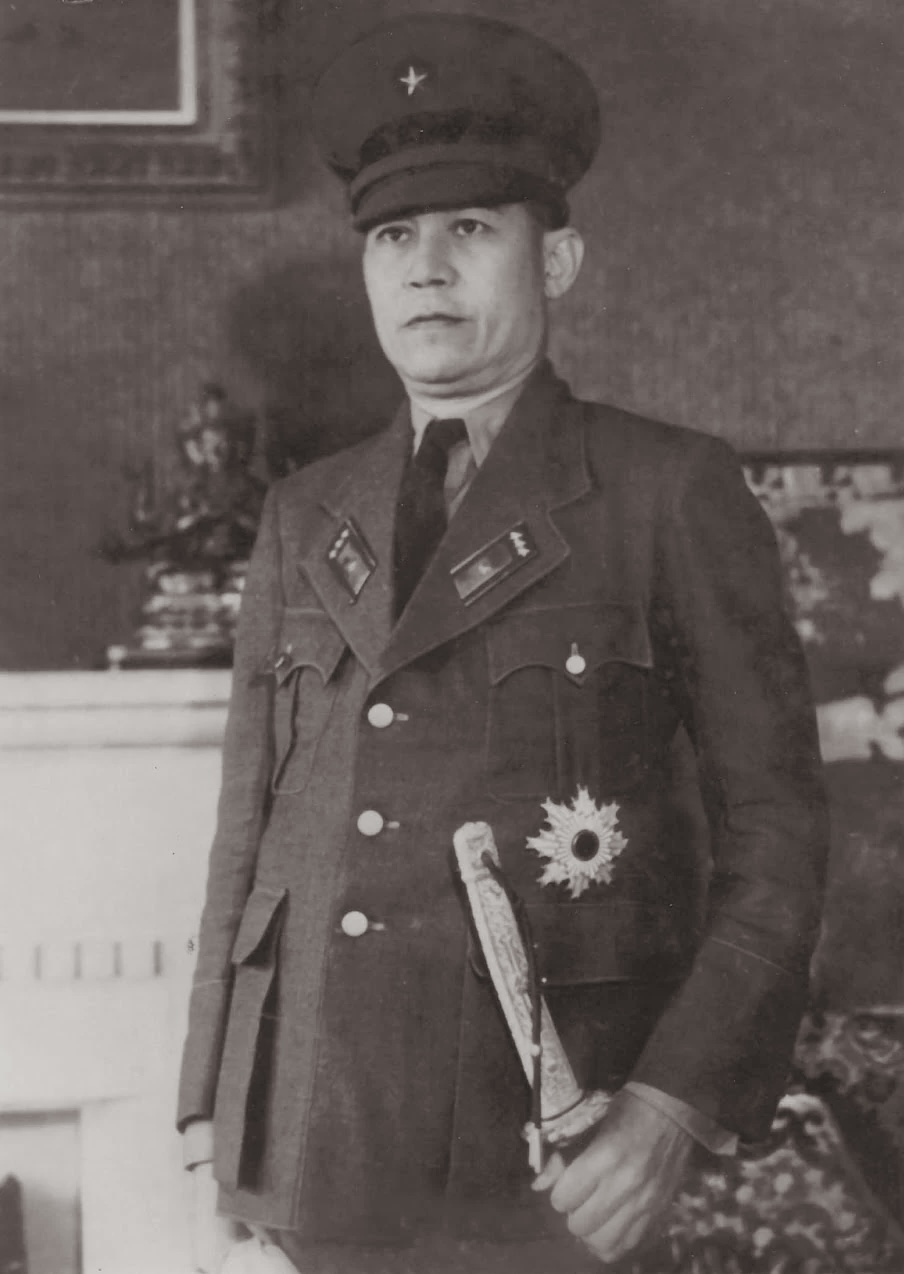
Ba Maw

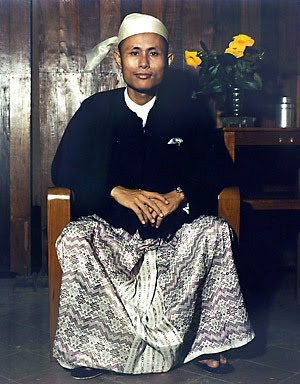
Aung San

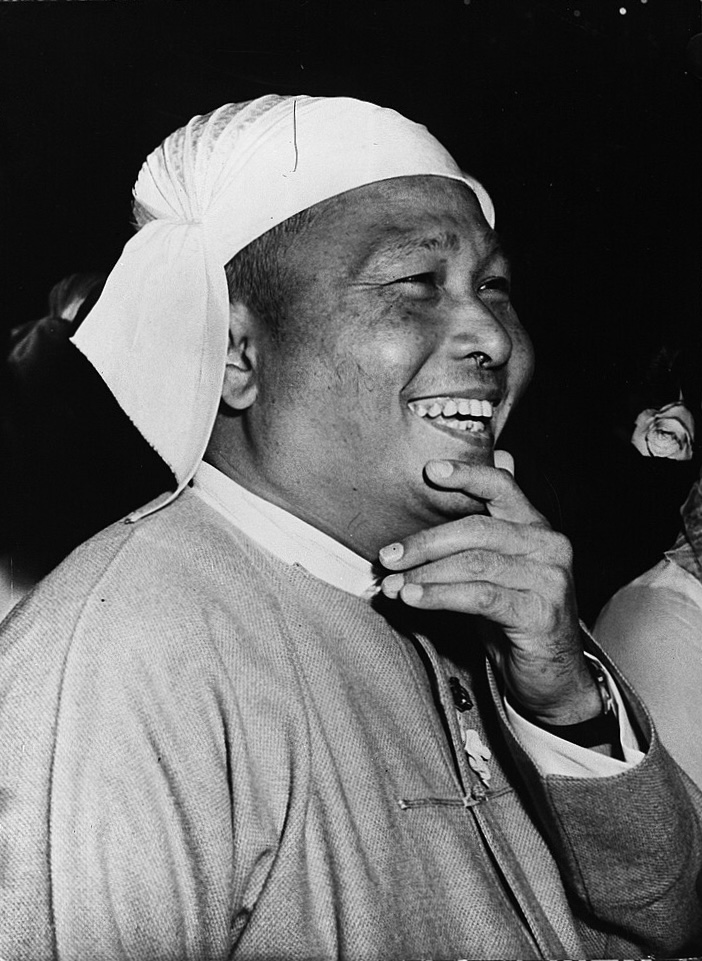
U Nu

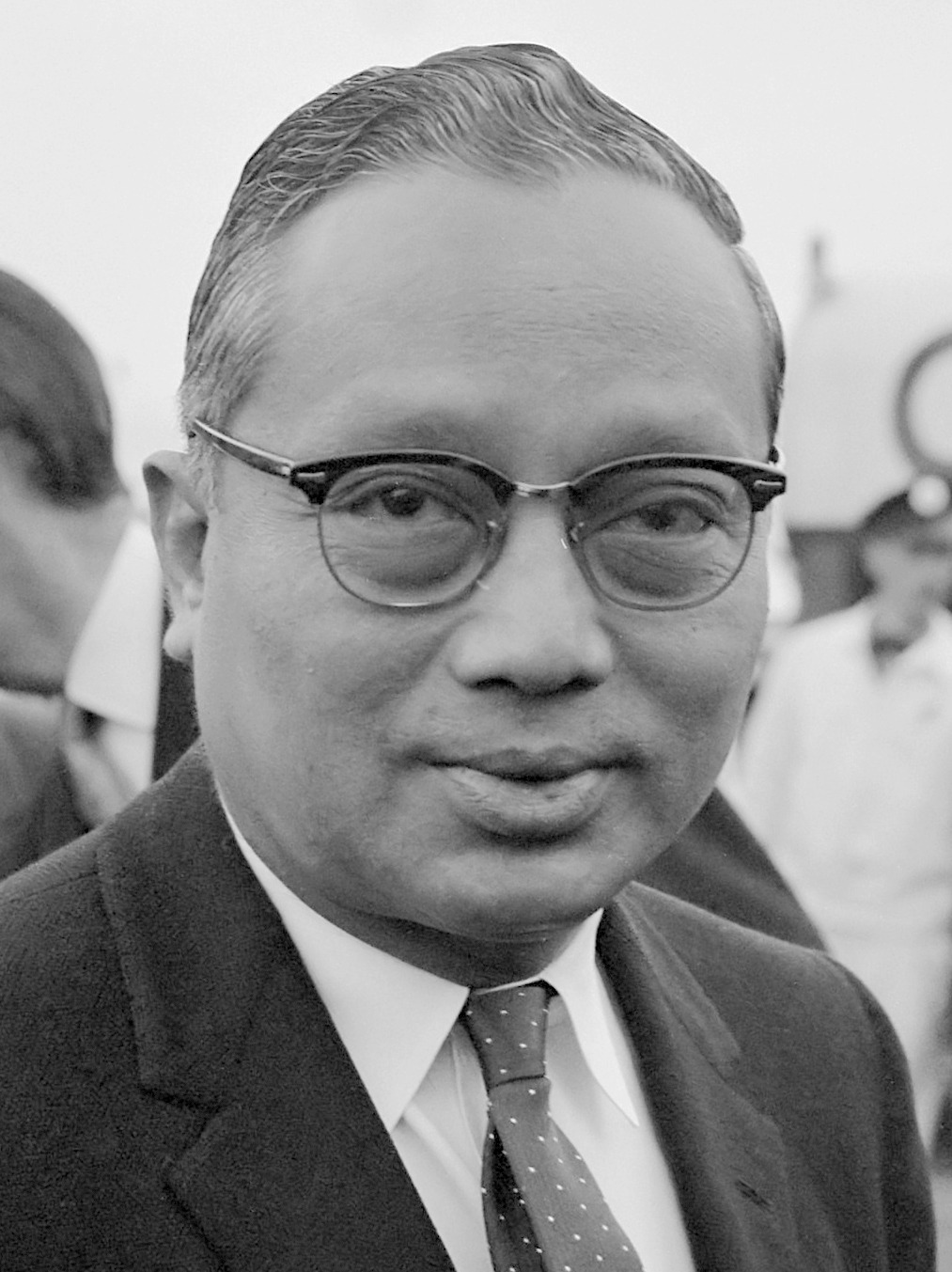
U Thant

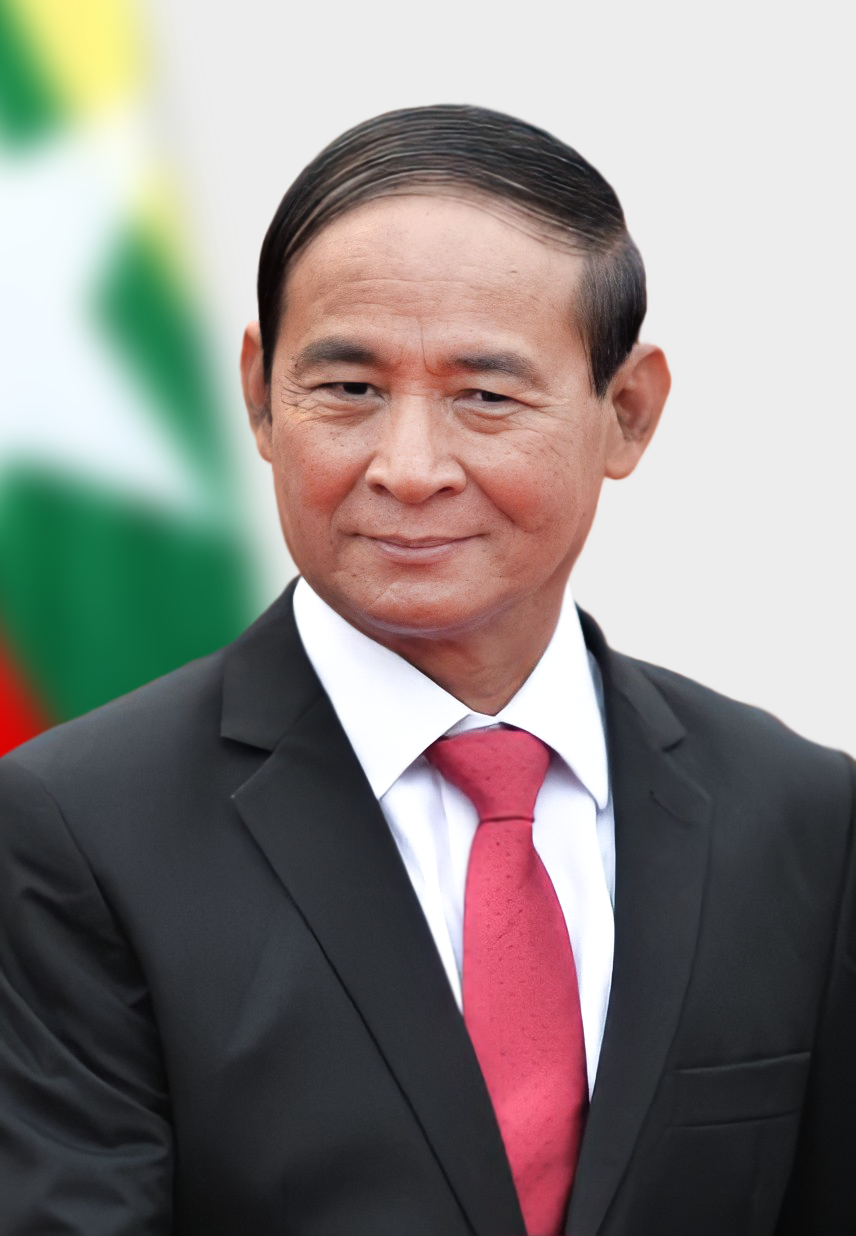
Win Myint
