= Subhasis Chaudhuri =

Indian electrical engineer and academic

- শুভাশিস চৌধুরী
- Born: 1 March 1963 (age 63); Bahutali, India
- Citizenship: India
- Education: Indian Institute of Technology Kharagpur (B.Tech., 1985) University of Calgary (M.Sc., 1987) University of California, San Diego (Ph.D., 1990)
- Notable work: Depth Recovery from Defocused Images
- Spouse: Sucharita Chaudhuri
- Parent(s): Nihar Kumar Chaudhuri & Santa Chaudhuri
- Scientific career
- Fields: Computer vision; image processing; machine learning; computational haptics
- Workplaces: Indian Institute of Technology Bombay
- Thesis: (1990)
- Doctoral advisor: Prof. Shankar Chatterjee

Subhasis Chaudhuri (born 1963) is an India-based electrical engineer, computer vision researcher, academic administrator and corporate board member. He is the K. N. Bajaj Chair Professor in the Department of Electrical Engineering at the Indian Institute of Technology Bombay (IIT Bombay), where he has been a member of the faculty since 1990. His research, primarily focused on solving ill-posed inverse problems, encompasses computer vision, image processing, machine learning and computational haptics, with contributions to depth estimation, image restoration and super-resolution, hyperspectral imaging, remote-sensing image analysis and haptic perception. He served as the Director of IIT Bombay from 2019 to 2024 and has been serving as the Chairman of the Board of Directors of Bombay Stock Exchange (BSE) Limited since November 2024.

Over a career spanning research, teaching, and institutional leadership, Chaudhuri has worked across several areas of visual computing and signal processing. His academic honors include the Shanti Swarup Bhatnagar Prize for Science and Technology, the Swarnajayanti Fellowship, the J. C. Bose National Fellowship, the G. D. Birla Award for Scientific Research and the NASI–Reliance Industries Platinum Jubilee Award. He is a Fellow of several national and international science and engineering academies and professional societies, and was elected a Fellow of The World Academy of Sciences (TWAS) in 2025.

== Career ==
=== Research ===
Chaudhuri joined the faculty of IIT Bombay in 1990 as an Assistant Professor and was promoted as a Full Professor in 1998. His work spans image processing, computer vision, machine learning and computational haptics. Major themes in his research include depth recovery from defocused imagery, image super-resolution, blind deconvolution, hyperspectral image visualization and fusion, pattern recognition in remote-sensing imagery, haptic rendering of point-cloud data, kinesthetic perception and haptic data communication.

His research career began at the University of Calgary with biomedical image analysis and subsequently expanded into computer vision, computational photography, remote sensing, haptics and machine learning. Across these areas, his work has addressed both foundational problems in image formation and reconstruction and applied problems involving visual interpretation, multimodal sensing and human-machine interaction.

Chaudhuri has also held editorial responsibilities for leading journals in computer vision and imaging, including IEEE Transactions on Pattern Analysis and Machine Intelligence (2006–2008), the International Journal of Computer Vision (2004--2023) and the SIAM Journal on Imaging Sciences (2018-2019). At IIT Bombay, he has supervised 37 doctoral and 140+ masters students as of 2026.

=== Administrative posts at IIT Bombay ===
Alongside his academic and research career, Chaudhuri has held a succession of leadership positions at IIT Bombay. These have included Head of the Department of Electrical Engineering, Dean of International Relations, Deputy Director(Academic and Infrastructural Affairs), hostel warden, Professor-in-Charge of the IIT Bombay–Monash Research Academy, and Director of the Institute.

== Awards and honors ==
Chaudhuri has received awards, fellowships and elected memberships in recognition of his contributions to engineering research, visual computing and higher education. Selected honors include:

- Shanti Swarup Bhatnagar Prize for Science and Technology, Engineering Sciences, 2004.
- Indian National Academy of Engineering (INAE) — Fellow, elected 2003.
- Indian Academy of Sciences — Fellow, elected 2005.
- Institute of Electrical and Electronics Engineers (IEEE) — Fellow, elected 2011.
- National Academy of Sciences, India (NASI) — Fellow, elected in 2004.
- Indian National Science Academy (INSA) — Fellow, elected in 2011.
- G. D. Birla Award for Scientific Research, 2011.
- NASI–Reliance Industries Platinum Jubilee Award for Application Oriented Innovation, 2011.
- J. C. Bose National Fellowship, 2008, 2013 and 2018.
- Prof. H. H. Mathur Excellence in Research Award, IIT Bombay, 2008.
- Swarnajayanti Fellowship, 2003.
- Distinguished Alumnus of IIT Kharagpur (2017) and the University of California, San Diego (2025).
- Recipient of a Doctor of Science (honoris causa) from the University of Burdwan (2023).

== Selected publications ==
Collection of books co-authored by Subhasis Chaudhuri

The following selection illustrates Chaudhuri’s work across image processing, computer vision, computational imaging, remote sensing and haptics. As of August 2026, his work has been cited over 13000 times. His H-index is 53.

=== Books ===
- Subhasis Chaudhuri and A. N. Rajagopalan, Depth From Defocus: A Real Aperture Imaging Approach. Springer, 1999.
- Subhasis Chaudhuri (ed.), Super-Resolution Imaging. Kluwer Academic Press, 2001.
- Subhasis Chaudhuri and Manjunath V. Joshi, Motion-Free Super-Resolution. Springer, 2005.
- Subhasis Chaudhuri, T. Pawar and S. Duttagupta, Ambulation Analysis in Wearable ECG. Springer, 2009.
- A. Ranjith Ram and Subhasis Chaudhuri, Video Analysis and Repackaging for Distance Education. Springer, 2012.
- Subhasis Chaudhuri and Ketan Kotwal, Hyperspectral Image Fusion. Springer, 2013.
- Subhasis Chaudhuri, Rajbabu Velmurugan and Renu Rameshan, Blind Image Deconvolution: Methods and Convergence. Springer, 2014.
- Subhasis Chaudhuri and A. Bhardwaj, Kinesthetic Perception: A Machine Learning Approach. Springer, 2017.
- V. Rajbabu, A. Hati, S. Banerjee and S. Chaudhuri, Image Co-Segmentation, Springer, New York, 2023.

=== Patents ===
Selected patents and patent applications include:

- "Device and method for advertising through video display system," with H. Shah — Indian Patent No. 241268.
- "Image Object Tracking and Segmentation using Active Contours," with V. Srikrishnan — U.S. Patent 8,781,160; granted July 2014.
- "Visual Object Tracking with Scale and Orientation Adaptation," with V. Srikrishnan and T. Nagaraja — U.S. Patent 8,335,348; granted December 2012.
- "System and Method for Fusing Images," with K. Kotwal and R. Shanmuganathan — U.S. patent applications 8,884,989 (granted November 2014) and 8,805,111 (granted August 2014).
- "System for Creating a Capsule Representation of an Instructional Video," with A. R. Ranjith — Indian patent application.
- "A virtual reality system and method for providing synchronous tactile feedback for user interaction," with S. Chaudhury and V. Gokhale — Indian Patent Application No. 503/MUM/2015.

=== Journal articles (Representative) ===
- S. Chaudhuri, S. Chatterjee, N. Katz, M. Nelson and M. Goldbaum, "Detection of Blood Vessels in Retinal Images Using Two Dimensional Matched Filters," IEEE Transactions on Medical Imaging, 8(3), 263–269 (1989).
- D. Rajan and S. Chaudhuri, "Simultaneous Estimation of Super-Resolved Scene and Depth Map from Low Resolution Observations," IEEE Transactions on Pattern Analysis and Machine Intelligence, 25, 1102–1117 (2003).
- M. V. Joshi and S. Chaudhuri, "Simultaneous estimation of super-resolved depth map and intensity field using photometric cue," Computer Vision and Image Understanding, 101(1), 31–44 (2006).
- Rajashekhara and S. Chaudhuri, “Segmentation and region of interest based image retrieval in low depth of field observations," Image and Vision Computing, 25(11), 1709–1724 (2007).
- V. Srikrishnan and S. Chaudhuri, “Stabilization of Parametric Active Contours Using a Tangential Redistribution Term," IEEE Transactions on Image Processing, 18(8), 1859–1872 (2009).
- K. Kotwal and S. Chaudhuri, “Visualization of Hyperspectral Images Using Bilateral Filtering," IEEE Transactions on Geoscience and Remote Sensing, 48(5), 2308–2316 (2010).

=== Conference papers (Representative) ===
- D. Rajan and S. Chaudhuri, “Simultaneous Estimation of Super-Resolved Intensity and Depth Maps from Low Resolution Defocused Observations of a Scene," IEEE International Conference on Computer Vision (ICCV), Vancouver, 2001.
- V. Srikrishnan, S. Chaudhuri, S. D. Roy and D. Sevcovic, "On Stabilization of Parametric Active Contours," IEEE Conference on Computer Vision and Pattern Recognition (CVPR), Minneapolis, 2007.
- Shanmuganathan Raman and Subhasis Chaudhuri, "A Matte-less, Variational Approach to Automatic Scene Compositing," IEEE International Conference on Computer Vision (ICCV), Rio de Janeiro, 2007.
- Ronak Shah, Rishabh Iyer and Subhasis Chaudhuri, “Object Mining for Large Video data," British Machine Vision Conference (BMVC), Dundee, 2011.
- T. M. Feroz Ali and Subhasis Chaudhuri, “Maximum Margin Metric Learning over Discriminative Nullspace for Person Re-identification," European Conference on Computer Vision (ECCV), Munich, 2018.
- Sayan Rakshit, Ushasi Chaudhuri, Biplab Banerjee and Subhasis Chaudhuri, "Class Consistency Driven Unsupervised Deep Adversarial Domain Adaptation," IEEE/CVF CVPR Workshops, 2019.

== Visiting professorships ==
Chaudhuri has held visiting professorships and academic appointments at institutions in France, Germany, Singapore and Hong Kong, including the University of Paris-Sud, Technical University of Munich, National University of Singapore, University of Erlangen–Nuremberg and Hong Kong Baptist University.
