= Wang Xiqin =

Chinese academic administrator

- 王希勤
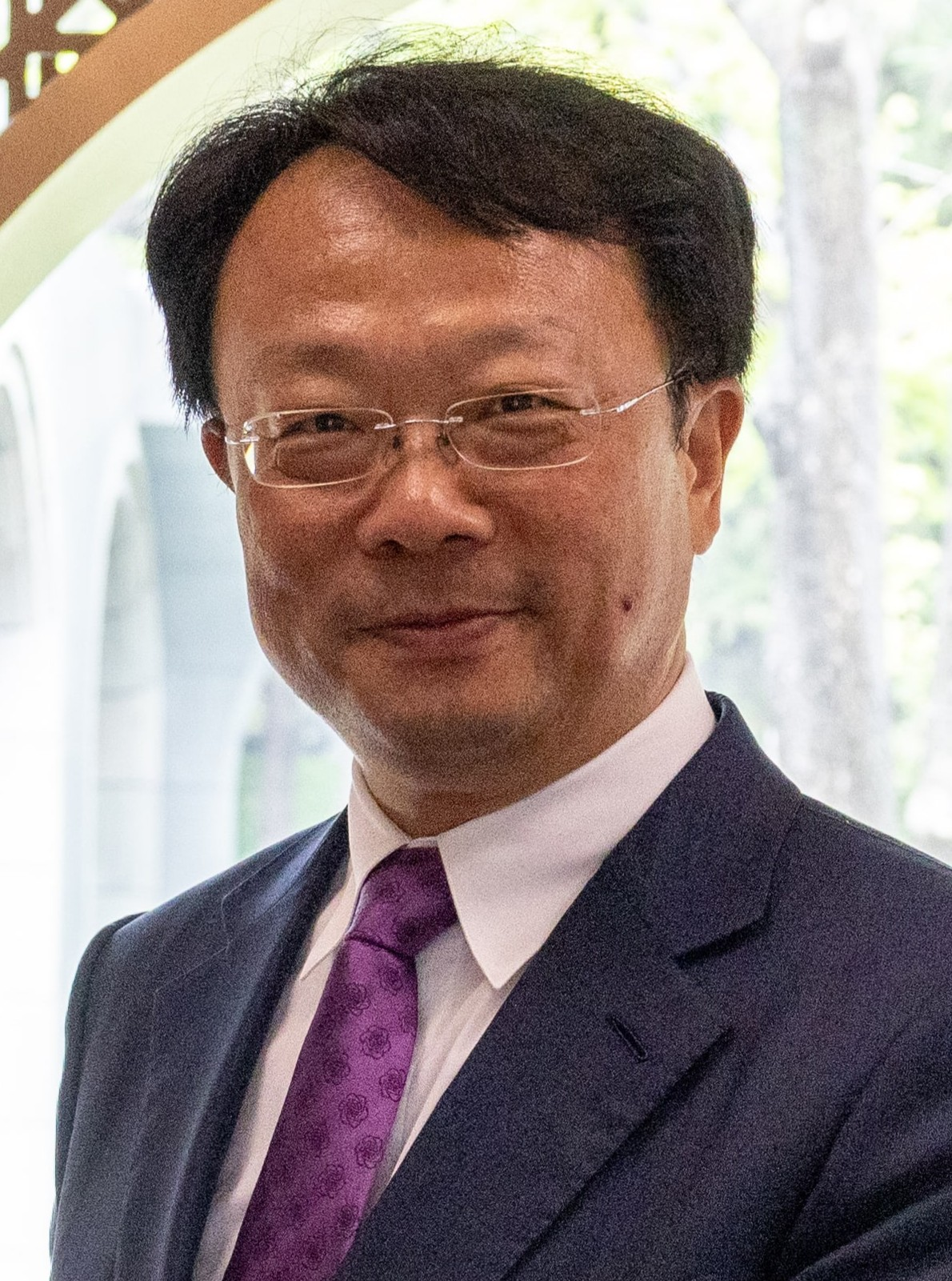
- Wang in 2023

President of Tsinghua University
- In office 25 February 2022 – December 2023
- Preceded by: Qiu Yong
- Succeeded by: Li Luming

Personal details
- Born: June 1968 (age 57) Jiangyan District, Jiangsu, China
- Party: Chinese Communist Party
- Education: Tsinghua University (BEng, DEng)

Wang Xiqin (Chinese: 王希勤; pinyin: Wáng Xīqín; born June 1968) is a Chinese electronic engineer and academic administrator who served as the president of Tsinghua University from February 2022 to December 2023. He was replaced by Li Luming with the approval of the Central Committee of the Chinese Communist Party.

== Biography ==
Wang was born in Jiangyan District, Taizhou, Jiangsu province in 1968. He secondary studied at Jiangyan High School.

Wang Xiqin received a Bachelor of Engineering and a Doctor of Engineering both in electronic engineering and from Tsinghua University in 1991 and 1996, respectively.

Wang joined the Chinese Communist Party (CCP) in November 1990. After graduation, he stayed at the university and worked successively as deputy director and director of Electronic Engineering Department, vice dean of the School of Information Science and Technology, director of Personnel Department and director of Human Resources Development Office, and deputy director of Supervision Committee. He became assistant president in February 2016. In December 2016, he was appointed vice president. After this office was terminated in October 2018, he became executive vice president. On 25 February 2022, he was promoted to be president, a position at vice-ministerial level.

Educational offices
Preceded by Qiu Yong	President of Tsinghua University; 2022–2023	Succeeded by Li Luming
