= Nazarbayev University =

International research university based in Astana, Kazakhstan

Coordinates: 51°05′24″N 71°23′58″E

- Kazakh: Назарбаев университеті
- Type: Public
- Established: 28 June 2010; 16 years ago
- President: Waqar Ahmad
- Provost: Rehan Sadiq
- Students: 7089
- Undergraduates: 4790
- Postgraduates: 1691
- Location: Astana, Kazakhstan
- Website: nu.edu.kz

Nazarbayev University (NU; Kazakh: Назарбаев университеті; Russian: Назарбаев Университет) is an autonomous research university in Astana, Kazakhstan. It was founded by the former President of Kazakhstan Nursultan Nazarbayev on 28 June 2010. It is an English-medium institution, with an international faculty and staff.

== History ==
Nazarbayev University began admitting students to its Foundation programme in Autumn 2010.

On 22 December 2010, the Parliament of Kazakhstan adopted a law granting the University special status, which was further incorporated into the law on the status of Nazarbayev University, Nazarbayev Intellectual Schools, and Nazarbayev Foundation on 19 January 2011. As part of organizational arrangement, the university was made administratively independent from the Ministry of Education and Science of Kazakhstan.

In 2012, the Graduate School of Education and the Graduate School of Public Policy began admitting students. In 2013, the Graduate School of Business started to offer Executive MBA programme.

Chinese President Xi Jinping announced what became the Belt and Road Initiative during a 7 September 2013 speech in a lecture theatre at the university. Referring to the concept as the "Silk Road Economic Belt," Xi described his vision for increasing connections between Asia and Europe via central Asia.

In June 2015, Nazarbayev University celebrated its first graduation ceremony. 380 Bachelor's degrees and 142 Master's degrees were conferred by the University.

In September 2015, the Nazarbayev University School of Medicine opened with the first admission of students to its M.D. program. In September 2017, School of Mining and Geosciences was opened.

It joined Asian Universities Alliance in 2017 as a founding member. European University Association's Independent external evaluation of NU was published in 2017.

In 2019, the School of Engineering, School of Sciences and Technologies and the School Humanities and Social Sciences were restructured into the School of Engineering and Digital Sciences and the School of Sciences and Humanities.

The logo of Nazarbayev University as projected by a hologram

In February 2020, BALEAP has affirmed full accreditation of NUFYP EAP program of NU Center for Preparatory Studies. The Graduate School of Public Policy (GSPP) Masters programs are fully accredited by the European Association for Public Administration Accreditation (EAPAA) in 2020.

In 2021, University Medical Center was accredited by JCI as a single Medical Center. NU got Full membership in the European University Association and the European Network for Academic Integrity.

In July 2023, due to change in legislation, Nursultan Nazarbayev was removed from the office of the chair of the Supreme Board of Trustees. The current chair is the current president Kassym-Jomart Tokayev.

Waqar Ahmad (pictured) is the incumbent President of Nazarbayev University

In September 2023, the Graduate School of Business (GSB) received accreditation from the Association of MBAs (AMBA) and the Business Graduates Association (BGA).

== Programs ==
=== Nazarbayev University Foundation Year Program (NUFYP) ===
Most students undergo one-year intensive foundation course at the Center for Preparatory Studies before entering undergraduate programs. The program provides an intensive academic, scientific, and language proficiency preparation for English-medium studies. Education is offered to both for recipients of state scholarship and privately-financed students.

=== Undergraduate programs ===
School of Mining and Geosciences (SMG)

- BSc in Geology
- BSc in Petroleum Engineering
- BSc in Mining Engineering

School of Engineering and Digital Sciences (SEDS)

- Mechanical and Aerospace Engineering
- Chemical Engineering and Materials Science
- Electrical and Computer Engineering
- Civil and Environmental Engineering
- Computer Science
- Robotics and Mechatronics

School of Sciences and Humanities (SSH)

- Political Science & International Relations
- Sociology
- Anthropology
- History
- World Languages and Literature
- Chemistry
- Physics
- Biological Sciences
- Mathematics

School of Medicine (SoM)

- Nursing Program (BSN)
- Nursing
- Nursing Professional Development Program (PDP)
- Medical sciences

School of Business

- Bachelor of Business Administration (BBA)
- Economics

=== Master's and doctorate programs ===
- Graduate School of Education
- Graduate School of Public Policy
- Graduate School of Business
- School of Engineering and Digital Sciences
- School of Sciences and Humanities
- School of Medicine
- School of Mining and Geosciences

=== Professional development programs ===
- Executive Education programs for top and mid-level managers
- Professional Development Programs at the Graduate School of Education
- Professional Development Program for public sector professionals

== Research ==
Nazarbayev University is a research-oriented university that aims at training human resources in academia and business. Research funding supported through internal research programs, sponsored funds, national and international grants.

In addition to faculty and student research, research undertaken by the following institutions:

- National Laboratory Astana (NLA) - multidisciplinary basic and applied research in the field of life sciences, energy, and other interdisciplinary areas of science, as well as activities to establish a scientific laboratory, experimental bases, centers, institutes for the development and implementation of scientific, scientific and technical, educational programs and training.
- Nazarbayev University Research and Innovation System (NURIS)
- Institute of Smart Systems and Artificial Intelligence - founded 2019, undertakes digital research with the focus on AI and machine intelligence.

== Governance ==
The University is governed by the Board of Trustees, which operates under guidance of the Supreme Board of Trustees that administers the Nazarbayev Fund education system.

University rankings

Global – Overall
- THE World: 376-400 (2027)
- USNWR Global: =831 (2026-2027)

== NU Statistics ==
- 7,089 students, including:

4,790 undergraduate students, 1652 graduate students.

- 1,193 staff members.
- Over 20 buildings in use
- Over 270 research and teaching labs
