= Eastern ARC =

Eastern Academic Research Consortium (Eastern Arc)
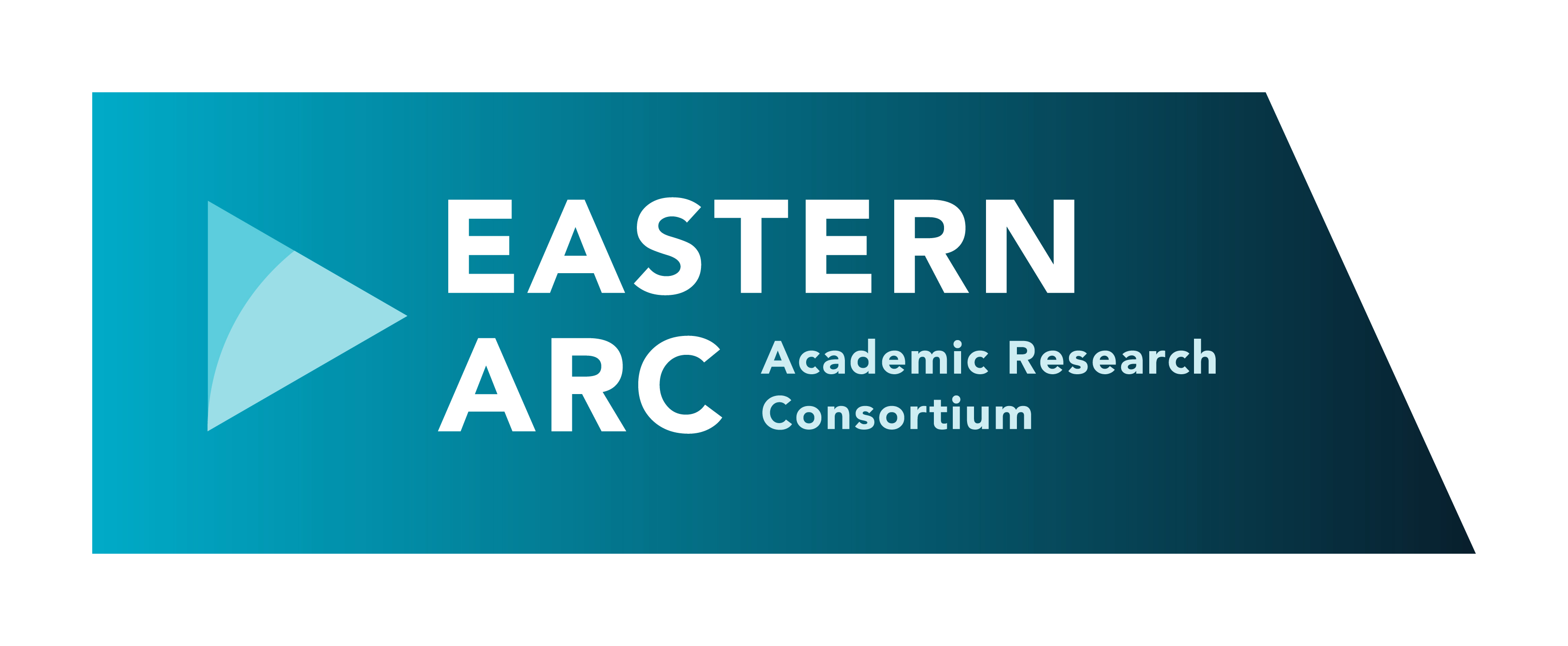
- Abbreviation: EARC
- Formation: 2013
- Location: United Kingdom
- Members: University of Essex; University of East Anglia; University of Kent; University of Sussex

The Eastern Academic Research Consortium, or "Eastern Arc", is a regional research collaboration between the University of East Anglia, the University of Essex, the University of Kent and the University of Sussex. The four partner institutions are all part of the "plate glass universities" established in the 1960s.

The establishment of Eastern Arc was recognised by Harrison, Smith and Kinton (2015) as part of the 'new regionalisation of UK higher education.'

== Universities ==
Map of England showing the Eastern Arc universities

University	Undergraduate students (2024/25)	Postgraduate students (2024/25)	Total students (2024/25)	Total academic staff (2024/25)	Total income (2024/25, £ millions)	Research income (2024/25, £ millions)
East of England
University of East Anglia	12,535	4,410	16,945	1,985	315	38
University of Essex	9,310	4,710	14,015	1,555	287	39
South East England
University of Kent	13,340	2,730	16,070	1,175	268	17
University of Sussex	12,920	4,375	17,290	1,985	346	40

== First iteration: 2013–19 ==
In its first iteration Eastern Arc focussed on three themes to encourage interdicsdiplinary collaboration between its members. Each university acted as the academic lead in one of the three areas.

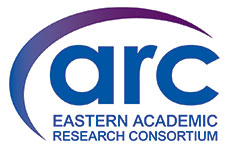
The logo used in the first iteration of Eastern Arc

=== The three themes ===
- Digital Humanities was led by the University of Kent.
- Quantitative Social Science was led by the University of Essex.
- Synthetic Biology was led by the University of East Anglia.

=== Leads and fellows ===
Each of the themes was led by a permanent academic at each university, and a fellow was appointed on a five-year contract to work with them, meaning that there were nine early career researchers funded across Eastern Arc

=== Studentships ===
Within Digital Humanities and Quantitative Social Sciences there were two students at each university; in Synthetic Biology there were three.

=== Networks and funding ===
During its first iteration, Eastern Arc was involved in a number of funded projects and networks, including Enabling Innovation: Research to Application (EIRA) (funded by Research England), the Business and Local Government Data Research Centre (funded by the Economic and Social Research Council), and the Thames Estuary Production Corridor (funded by the Department for Digital, Culture, Media and Sport (DCMS)). It was also part of three doctoral training partnerships:

- Advanced Research and Innovation in the Environmental Sciences (ARIES), funded by the Natural Environment Research Council. Other members are: Plymouth, Royal Holloway.
- Consortium of the Humanities and the Arts South-east England (CHASE), funded by the Arts and Humanities Research Council. Other members are: Birkbeck, Goldsmiths, Courtauld, Open University, SOAS, Sussex.
- South East Network for Social Sciences (SeNSS), funded by the Economic and Social Research Council. Other members are: City, Goldsmiths, Reading, Roehampton, Royal Holloway, Surrey, Sussex.

== Second iteration: 2020–onwards ==
In 2019 Phil Ward was appointed as the consortium's first director. He developed a strategy for 2020-25 that continued to focus on developing interdisciplinary collaborations, but moved away from the three pillars of the first iteration, focusing instead on four themes that were identified as collective strengths of the three universities through mapping field-weighted citation impact, REF2014 outcomes, grant capture and a number of other qualitative data. At the centre of the strategy were three objectives:

- to develop a strong collaborative core within its themes
- to support experimental, risk-taking activity.
- to engage with external policy-makers and end-users.

=== The University of Sussex joins the consortium ===
In January 2024 the University of Sussex joined the Consortium. As with original three members, Sussex was one of the seven original plate glass universities, and shared their radical foundation principles of interdisciplinarity and being 'disruptive by design'. Their membership necessitated the signing of a new memorandum of understanding, which extended the remit of the Consortium 'to support research, education, innovation, knowledge exchange, training, and equipment-sharing.'

=== Strategy 2025–30 ===
Sussex's membership coincided with the development and launch of the Consortium's next five year strategy, the vision of which was 'to collaborate to deliver real, tangible and positive change in four areas that both define our region and impact the world: coast, food, heritage and sanctuary.'

The pillars of activity for the strategy build on the original three objectives:

- To enable and facilitate collaboration
- To support a positive research culture
- To advocate on behalf of its members and wider region.
