= European Association for International Education =

- Founded: 1989
- Type: International organization
- Purpose: International higher education
- Location: Amsterdam, The Netherlands
- Region served: Europe, Worldwide
- Method: Training, conferences, publications, networking opportunities
- Website: www.eaie.org

The European Association for International Education (EAIE) is a European centre for expertise, networking and resources in the internationalisation of higher education.

It is a non-profit, member-led organisation serving individuals actively involved in the internationalisation of their institutions through training, conferences, research and knowledge acquisition and sharing.

The EAIE is based in Amsterdam (Netherlands), and has more than 3000 members from over 90 different countries, the majority of which are located in Europe.

== History ==
In the late 1980s, European international educators realised the need for a European member association dedicated to those working in the field of international education.

In 1989 the EAIE was created as a result of the Founding Conference in Amsterdam. The Conference attracted around 600 professionals inspired by the idea of joining a network of international educators. The original working title of the Association was the "European Association for International Education Administrators". However, this was later changed to the European Association for International Education when the organisation was officially created.

== Conferences ==
The EAIE Annual Conference is the primary event through which the Association brings professionals to discuss the latest trends in international education. The conference is the largest event of its kind in Europe and is hosted in a different city each year.

- 35th Annual Conference: Gothenburg
- 34th Annual Conference: Toulouse
- 33rd Annual Conference: Rotterdam
- 32nd Annual Conference: Barcelona
- 2021 EAIE Community Exchange: Online
- 2020 EAIE Community Exchange: Online
- 31st Annual Conference: Helsinki
- 30th Annual Conference: Geneva
- 29th Annual Conference: Seville
- 28th Annual Conference: Liverpool
- 27th Annual Conference: Glasgow
- 26th Annual Conference: Prague
- 25th Annual Conference: Istanbul
- 24th Annual Conference: Dublin
- 23rd Annual Conference: Copenhagen
- 22nd Annual Conference: Nantes
- 21st Annual Conference: Madrid
- 20th Annual Conference: Antwerp
- 19th Annual Conference: Trondheim
- 18th Annual Conference: Basel
- 17th Annual Conference: Krakow
- 16th Annual Conference: Turin
- 15th Annual Conference: Vienna
- 14th Annual Conference: Porto
- 13th Annual Conference: Tampere
- 12th Annual Conference: Leipzig
- 11th Annual Conference: Maastricht
- 10th Annual Conference: Stockholm
- 9th Annual Conference: Barcelona
- 8th Annual Conference: Budapest
- 7th Annual Conference: Milan
- 6th Annual Conference: London
- 5th Annual Conference: The Hague
- 4th Annual Conference: Berlin
- 3rd Annual Conference: Montpellier
- 2nd Annual Conference: Amsterdam
- 1st Annual Conference: Amsterdam

== Publications ==
The EAIE publishes various publications on topics concerning the internationalisation of higher education.

Forum magazine is the flagship member magazine of the Association, published three times per year, with a readership of circa 3000. The first issue of Forum was published in 1999. In 2012, the magazine incorporated a thematic approach, tackling one prominent topic within international education per issue.

Pathways to Practice is EAIE's e-publication series, published several times a year and offers detailed step-by-step guides to implementing essential internationalisation practices.

The EAIE Barometer is the largest and most geographically representative study of its kind ever undertaken in Europe. The research focuses on the current state of affairs regarding internationalisation of higher education in Europe as viewed by professionals directly involved in this work.

The Journal of Studies in International Education is a peer-reviewed journal for higher education administrators, educators, researchers and policymakers. Volumes are published five times per year and articles vary from 4000 to 6000 words in length. The EAIE is part of the Association for Studies in International Education (ASIE) which is responsible for the Journal.

The EAIE also publishes series and stand-alone publications on some of the biggest trends and issues facing international higher education today, like international admissions and exchange mobility.

== Other activities ==
The EAIE provides other activities for its members, such as a Mentorship programme, the Train the Trainers programme, the EAIE Academy and its advocacy work to effect positive change in higher education internationalisation. In 2012, the EAIE led a working group of international higher education associations to develop a charter advocating international students' rights. The EAIE has also been developing a global network of centralised student data depositories to make digital student data portability a reality.

== Governance ==
The EAIE leadership comprises the President, Vice-President, Executive Director, Board and General Council. The Board (which includes the President and Vice-President) works to guide the Association's future by monitoring the strategy's implementation as determined by the General Council. The General Council is responsible for the organisation's long-term vision, budget and accounts. Elections for positions in the EAIE leadership are held once every two years. The current EAIE President is Sara López Selga from the Pompeu Fabra University, Spain.

Past EAIE Presidents include:

- 2022-2024 Piet Van Hove, Belgium
- 2020–2022 Michelle Stewart, UK
- 2018–2020 Sabine Pendl, Austria
- 2016–2018 Markus Laitinen, Finland
- 2014–2016 Laura Howard, Spain
- 2012–2014 Hans-Georg van Liempd, the Netherlands
- 2010–2012 Guðrún Pálsdóttir, Iceland
- 2008–2010 Bjørn Einar Aas, Norway
- 2007–2008 Fiona Hunter, Italy
- 2005–2007 Antoinette Charon Wauters, Switzerland
- 2003–2004 Jeroen Torenbeek, the Netherlands
- 2002 Tim Birtwistle, UK
- 2001 Wedigo de Vivanco, Germany
- 2000 Joan-Anton Carbonell, UK
- 1999 Iris Schwanck, France
- 1998 Linda Johnson, the Netherlands
- 1997 Giancarlo Spinelli, Italy
- 1996 Marianne Hildebrand, Sweden
- 1995 Eva Haberfellner, Germany
- 1994 Hans de Wit, the Netherlands
- 1993 France Gamerre, France
- 1992 Kjetil Flatin, Norway
- 1991 Maria Sticchi Damiani, Italy
- 1990 Axel Markert, Germany

== See also ==
- International education
- List of higher education associations and alliances
- NAFSA: Association of International Educators
