= N8 Research Partnership =

Northern England university consortium

- Formation: 2006
- Type: Consortium of United Kingdom-based universities
- Registration no.: 05920709
- Legal status: Private company limited by shares
- Region served: Northern England
- Members: Durham University; Lancaster University; University of Leeds; University of Liverpool; University of Manchester; Newcastle University; University of Sheffield; University of York
- Owners: Member universities
- Board of directors: Vice-Chancellors of the member universities
- Website: http://www.n8research.org.uk

The N8 Research Partnership is a partnership created in 2006 of the eight most research-intensive universities in Northern England – Durham, Lancaster, Leeds, Liverpool, Manchester, Newcastle, Sheffield and York. The N8 Research Partnership aims to maximise the impact of this research base by identifying and co-ordinating powerful research teams and collaborations across the North of England. Collectively, the N8 universities undertake more than £650 million of research income per annum and employ over 18,000 academic staff. The N8 Research Partnership also works closely with industry.

== History ==
The N8 Research Partnership initially focused on five areas of research: Ageing and Health, Energy, Molecular Engineering, Regenerative Medicine and Water. The themes were chosen to build on existing research within the partnership which had the potential for economic and social benefit.

In March 2007, the N8 Research Partnership was awarded grant funding of £6 million from The Northern Way Growth Fund to set up 'virtual' collaborative Research Centres around each of these themes.

N8 launched a project to map the research equipment across universities in the North and has published a toolkit and a white paper to point the way to greater collaboration between universities and improved research links with industry. A toolkit, and database, have been developed to advance this area nationally.

The N8's key aim of fostering greater collaboration with industry was boosted in January 2012 when the N8 Industry Innovation Forum launched. There have to date been five IIF meetings focused on topics where there is significant cross-sector, industry-led demand for new insights and research capability on topics such as advanced materials, Food Security, and Active and Healthy Ageing. New collaboration ideas emerging from these have generated £10 million of external funding including £3 million from industry partners.

Another development was the launch of the N8 High Performance Computing facility in March 2013 (now the N8 Centre of Excellence in Computationally Intensive Research; N8 CIR). This provides industry and university researchers with access to high performance computing alongside consultancy and e-infrastructure training. The original HPC supercomputer, hosted at the University of Leeds, was capable of performing 110 trillion operations per second, the equivalent of half a million iPads. In 2020 the Engineering and Physical Sciences Research Council granted £3.1 million funding to a new supercomputer, the Northern Intensive Computing Environment (NICE), to be hosted by Durham University on behalf of the N8 Research Partnership. The overall cost of the new supercomputer was £8.4 million, with the balance being provided by the N8 universities. NICE will be a tier-2 supercomputer built on 32 IBM Power 9 dual-CPU nodes, each having 4 NVIDIA V100 GPUs. The new supercomputer was installed in 2021, named Bede after the 8th century monk and scholar who is buried in Durham Cathedral.

In 2015, multimillion-pound funding was awarded to N8 Research Partnership, to advance AgriFood Resilience, and Policing, research areas across N8 institutions and with partners.

In 2023, the N8 became the first coalition of British universities to coordinate policies on open access, issuing a statement calling for academics to retain rights to their work under a CC BY licence, which some publishers reject. Publishing under this licence would allow work to be placed immediately in an institutional repository, rather than the intellectual property being transferred to the publishers.

In 2025, the Financial Times reported that the N8 were discussing closer collaboration in language degrees, including sharing resources and best practices amid the financial crisis facing British universities. Nigel Harkness, deputy vice-chancellor and professor of French at Newcastle University, said that they were not looking at shared degree provision but at other forms of practical collaboration.

== Research ==
As of 2024 the N8 Research Partnership's main research themes are: Net Zero North, Child of the North, Computationally Intensive Research and Policing Research Partnership.

== Universities ==
Locations of N8 Research Partnership universities.

The eight universities in the Partnership are all located in Northern England. One is a pre-Victorian collegiate university founded in the first half of the nineteenth century, five are civic universities founded as university colleges in the second half of the nineteenth century, and two are collegiate plate glass universities founded in the 1960s. They range in size from around 13,000 students to just under 40,000, and in annual income from a few hundred million pounds to over a billion pounds. Seven of the universities (all except Lancaster) are members of the Russell Group, and all were in the top 25 of Times Higher Education's research power ranking based on the results of the 2021 Research Excellence Framework and Research Fortnight's research power table based on the results of the 2014 Research Excellence Framework.

The three N8 institutions in Yorkshire (Leeds, Sheffield and York) also collaborate in the White Rose University Consortium.

Between them, the N8 universities educate over 230,000 students, including 17,000 studying for a research degree, and have a combined research income of over £1.2 billion. A report in 2016, commissioned by the group, demonstrated that they bring in £12.2 billion to the regional economy each year and generate 119,000 jobs across the North of England.

University	Undergraduate students (2024/25)	Postgraduate students (2024/25)	Total students (2024/25)	Total academic staff (2024/25)	Total income (2024/25, £ millions)	Research income (2024/25, £ millions)
North East England
Durham University	16,560	4,590	21,150	2,640	534	63
Newcastle University	21,245	5,985	27,230	2,935	619	134
North West England
Lancaster University	13,935	4,685	18,620	2,270	428	49
University of Liverpool	23,490	7,560	31,050	3,520	723	126
University of Manchester	30,565	15,735	46,305	5,515	1,422	303
Yorkshire and the Humber
University of Leeds	26,155	8,425	34,580	4,005	991	186
University of Sheffield	20,215	8,065	28,280	3,865	845	204
University of York	16,015	6,330	22,345	2,540	539	107
