= Science and Engineering South =

Consortium of Southeast England universities

- Formation: 2013
- Type: Consortium
- Region served: Southeast of England
- Members: Imperial College London; King's College London; University of Oxford; Queen Mary University of London; University of Southampton; University College London; University of Cambridge
- Website: www.ses.ac.uk

Science and Engineering South (SES, previously SES-5) is a consortium of seven public research-intensive universities in the Southeast of England, who pool their resources and facilities to further research in the fields of science and engineering.

== Consortium ==
Its members accounted for a third of all EPSRC spending in 2013, when the consortium was formed. King's College London joined the consortium in 2016, becoming the sixth member institution. By March 2017, Queen Mary University of London had joined the consortium. The University of Cambridge, one of the founding institutions, rejoined in 2019 after leaving in 2017.

SES enables a network of high-performance computers available for research and scientific calculations across all its member universities, such as the 12,000 core IRIDIS Intel Westmere supercomputer cluster.

== Universities ==
University	Undergraduate students (2024/25)	Postgraduate students (2024/25)	Total students (2024/25)	Total academic staff (2024/25)	Total income (2024/25, £ millions)	Research income (2024/25, £ millions)
East of England
University of Cambridge	13,345	9,220	22,565	6,180	2,457	593
Greater London
Imperial College London	12,080	10,440	22,525	4,730	1,474	446
King's College London	23,200	17,670	40,870	6,355	1,377	261
Queen Mary University of London	16,520	8,120	24,640	3,750	730	161
University College London	25,705	25,610	51,315	10,400	2,163	557
South East England
University of Oxford	14,355	11,865	26,225	8,005	2,829	801
University of Southampton	17,645	8,140	25,785	2,965	738	141

Science and Engineering South (Universities)
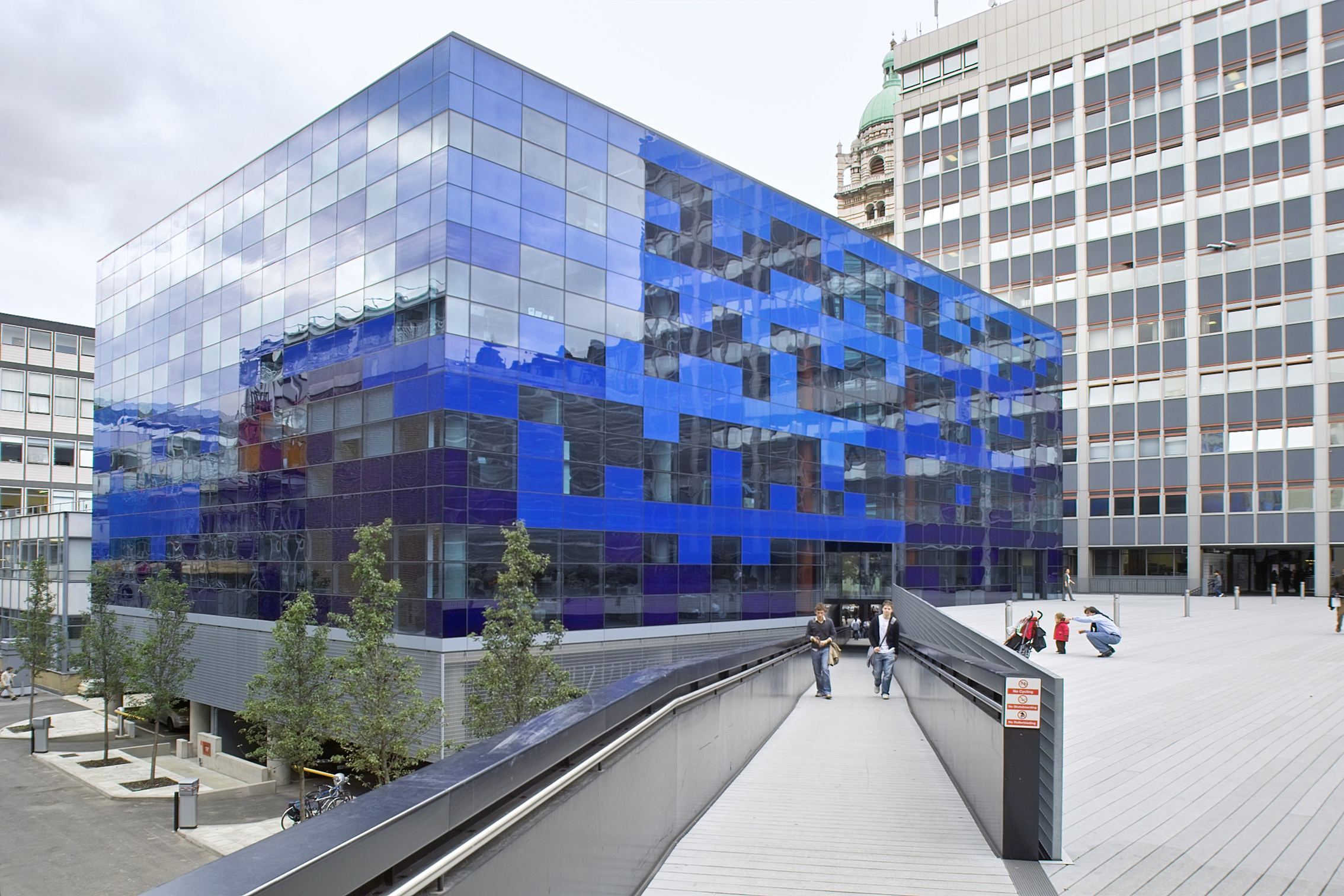
Imperial College London
(Faculty Building)

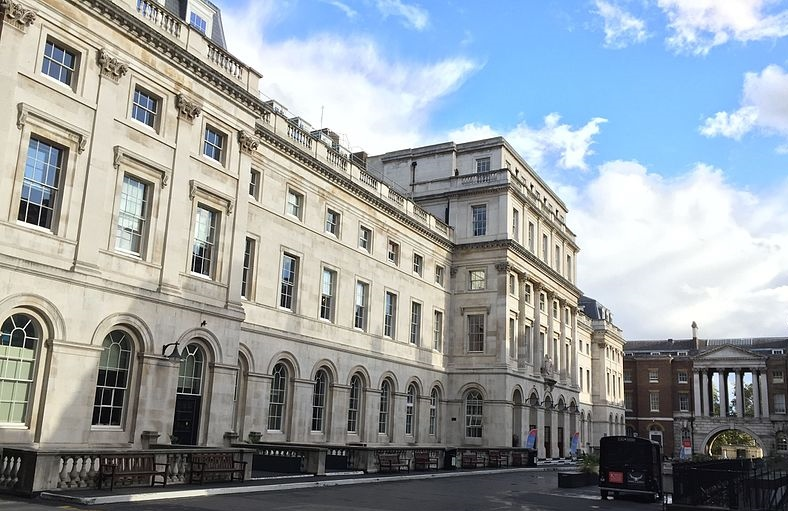
King's College London
(King's Building)

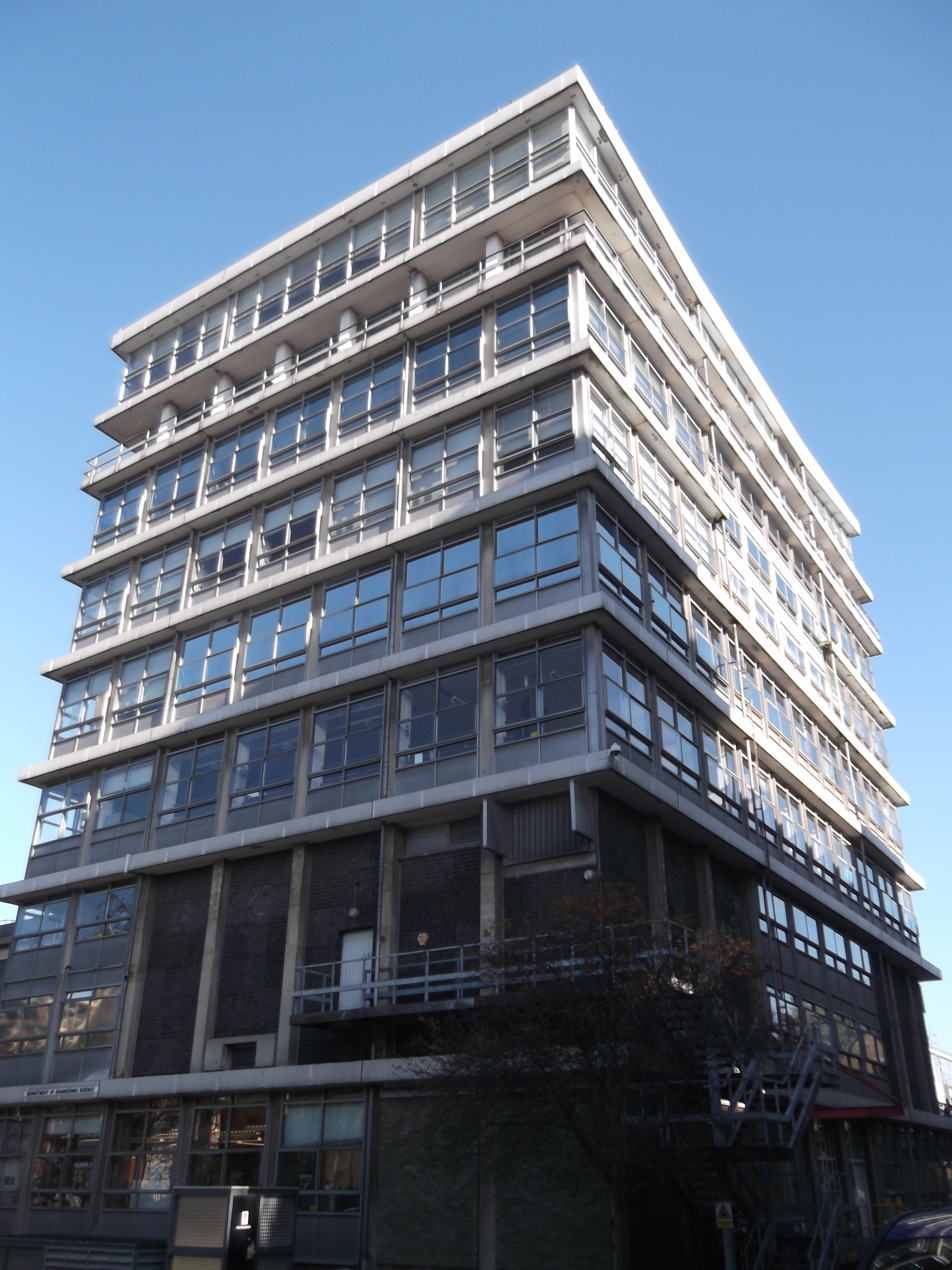
University of Oxford
(Thom Building)

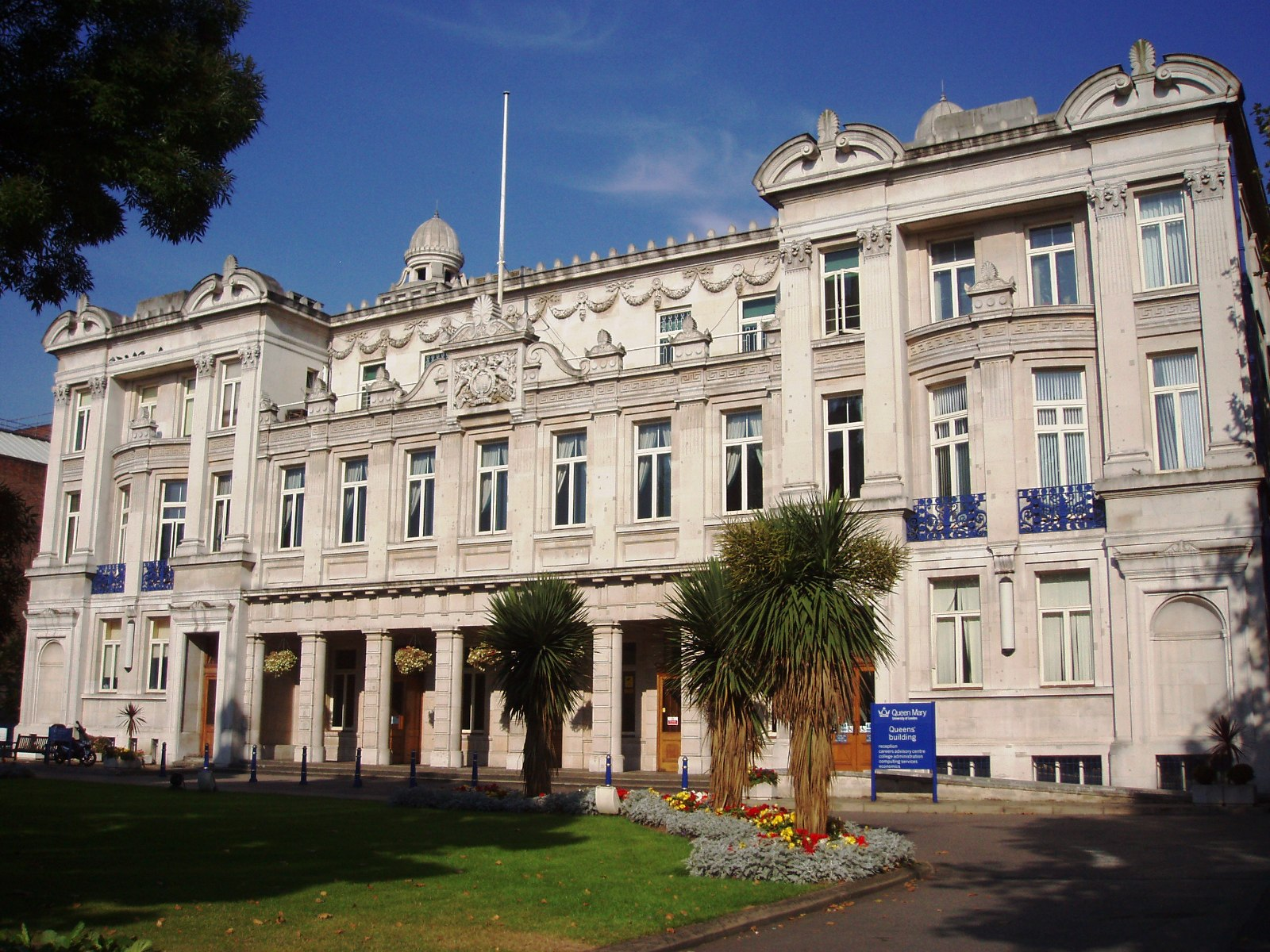
Queen Mary University of London
(The Queens' Building)

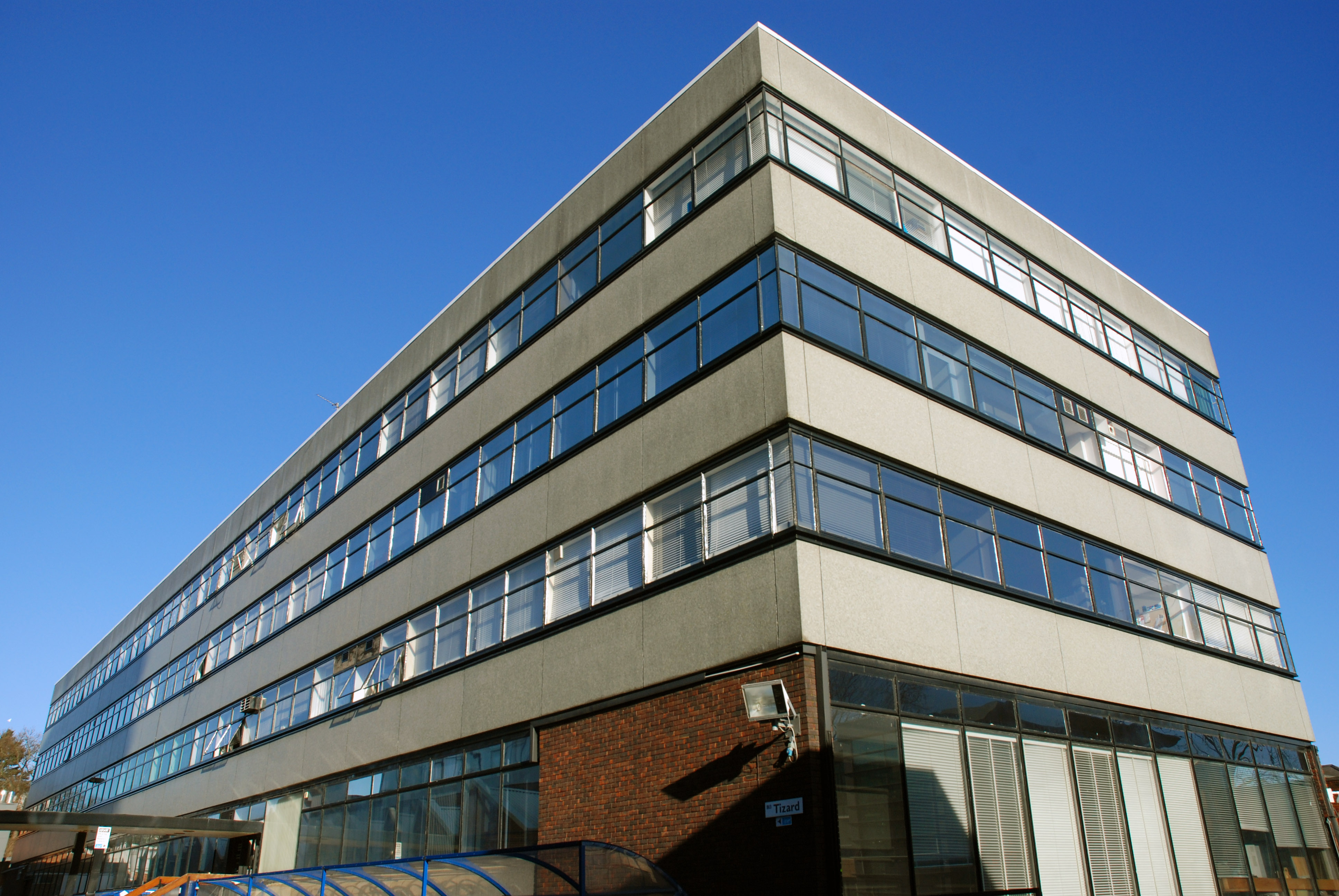
University of Southampton
(Institute of Sound and Vibration Research)

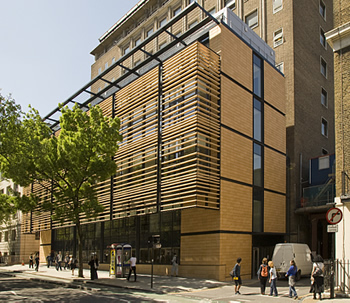
University College London
(Engineering Building)
