= Beatrix Busse =

German linguist

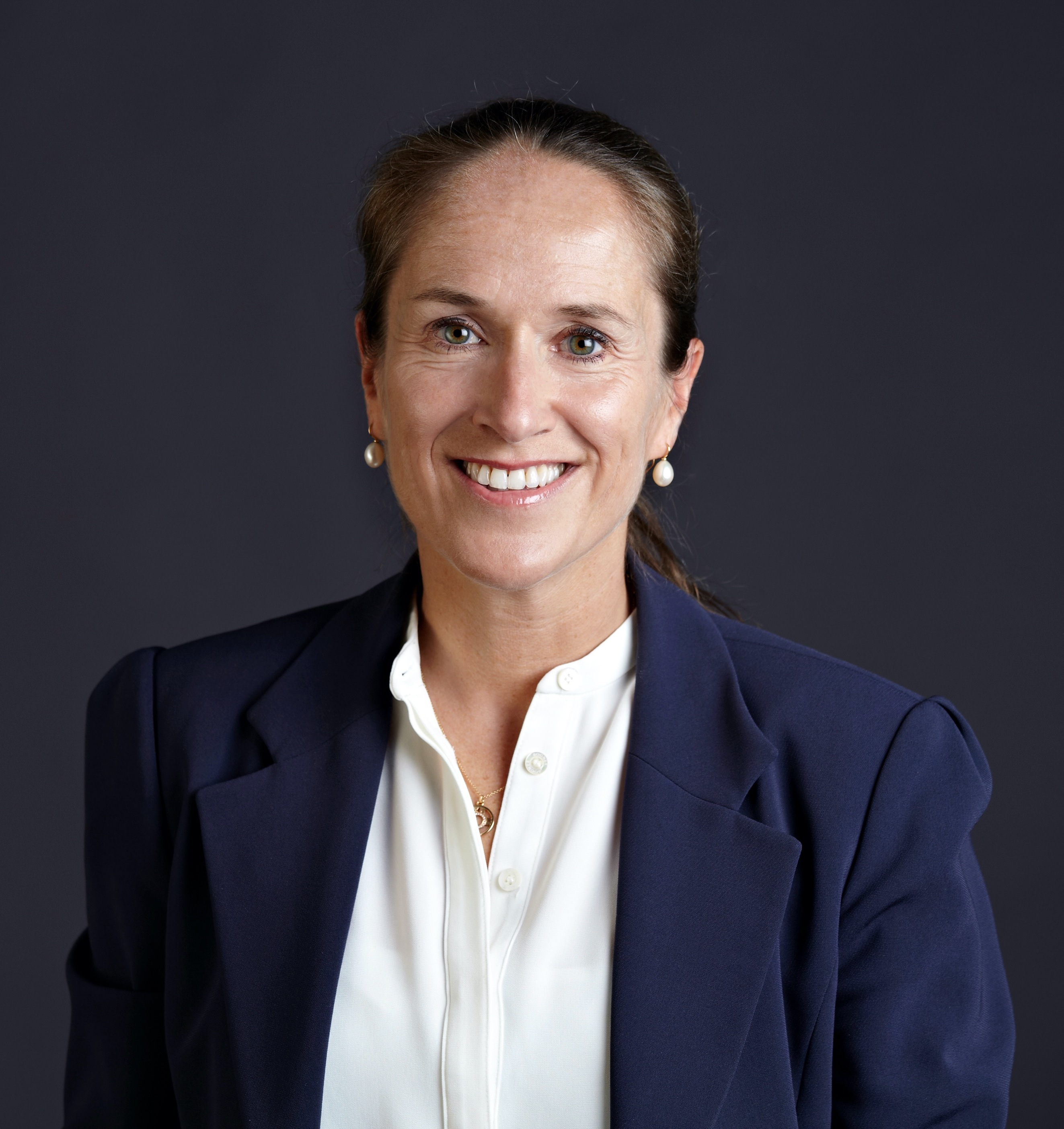
Beatrix Busse

Beatrix Busse (born 1973 in Haren) is Professor of English Linguistics and the Vice-Rector for Student Affairs and Teaching at the University of Cologne.

== Education and qualifications ==
Busse studied English and History at Osnabrück University, where she received her first degree (“Erstes Staatsexamen,” which is equivalent to a degree with a focus on teaching). She was a CARE Visitor at the University of Birmingham, Centre for Advanced Research in English, and the Shakespeare Institute in Stratford, for which she was awarded a scholarship from the German Academic Exchange Service (DAAD) in 2001. After completing her doctorate at the University of Münster in 2004, she was awarded a Visiting Fellowship of the British Academy at Lancaster University in 2007. From 2008 to 2010, she was an associate professor of English historical linguistics at the English department of the University of Bern in Switzerland, where she completed her Habilitation. From 2011 to 2019, she held the Chair of English Linguistics at Heidelberg University, where she was appointed as Vice-Rector for Teaching and Student Affairs twice, from 2013 to 2019.

== Academic career ==
Beatrix Busse was a research assistant (“wissenschaftliche Mitarbeiterin”) at the English Department of the University of Münster from 2001 to 2008.

In 2011, she became a professor of English Linguistics at the Heidelberg University Department of English, where she was the Vice-rector for Student Affairs and Teaching from 2013 to 2018 and founding Director of the Heidelberg Graduate School for Humanities and Social Sciences (HGGS) from 2015 to 2019. She was also a LERU representative for the Faculty of Modern Languages and a Marsilius Fellow at the Marsilius-Kolleg of Heidelberg University.

Since 2017, Busse has been a member for the DFG Research Training Group “Authority and Trust in American Culture, Society, History and Politics” (GRK 2244) at the Heidelberg Centre for American Studies. She was the spokesperson of the Research Training Group “Sprachkritik als Gesellschaftskritik im europäischen Vergleich / Critique of Language as Critique of Society – A European Perspective”. Busse is also the founding director of the Heidelberg School of Education and was the project manager of the heiEDUCATION, PLACE, and GO Digital endeavours.

In October 2019, Beatrix Busse was appointed Vice-Rector for Student Affairs and Teaching at the University of Cologne.

== Research projects ==
Busse has a broad range of research interests that include stylistics, corpus linguistics, history of English and historical pragmatics, sociolinguistics, language in urban space with a focus on Brooklyn, New York, and transfer linguistics. Her DFG funded project heidelGram is a corpus-based network analysis of English grammar books between 1550 and 1900. She is currently leading a project on discursive urban place-making in Brooklyn, New York.

Busse is part of the steering committee and the person responsible on behalf of the University of Cologne for EUniWell –the European University for Well-Being, which unites seven European universities from across diverse European regions. The universities of Birmingham, Cologne, Florence, Leiden, Linnaeus, Nantes, and Semmelweis (Budapest) unite students and staff members to drive transformation to support individual, social and environmental well-being in a global setting

== Memberships ==
Busse is the reviews editor of the International Journal of Corpus Linguistics as well as the series editor for the Diskursmuster – Discourse Patterns volume published by Mouton De Gruyter. She is on the editorial board for Advances in Stylistics (Continuum) and Language, Style and Literature (Palgrave) and the advisory board for the Historical Thesaurus of the Oxford English Dictionary. She is an editor for the heiEDUCATION Journal – Transdisziplinäre Studien zur Lehrerbildung.

Busse was on the board of directors of the Leibniz Science Campus Empirical Linguistics and Computational Language Modelling at Heidelberg University and the Leibniz Institute for the German Language, Mannheim from 2015 to 2019, and on the evaluation board for the Swiss National Science Foundation: National Research Focuses and Centres of Excellency in 2018. She is an honorary research fellow at the University of Glasgow, and deputy director of the Heidelberg Centre for Cultural Heritage. She is a board member of the Deutsches Kolonialkorpus as well as the coordinator of the Urban Space Research Network (USRN) at the University of Bremen.

Busse is a member of the Poetics and Linguistics Association (PALA) where she was a board member from 2007 to 2013, the International Computer Archive of Modern and Medieval English (ICAME), the International Society for the Linguistics of English (ISLE), the Deutscher Anglistenverband, and the International Association of Literary Semantics (IALS).
