= University of Cologne =

University in Germany

- Universität zu Köln
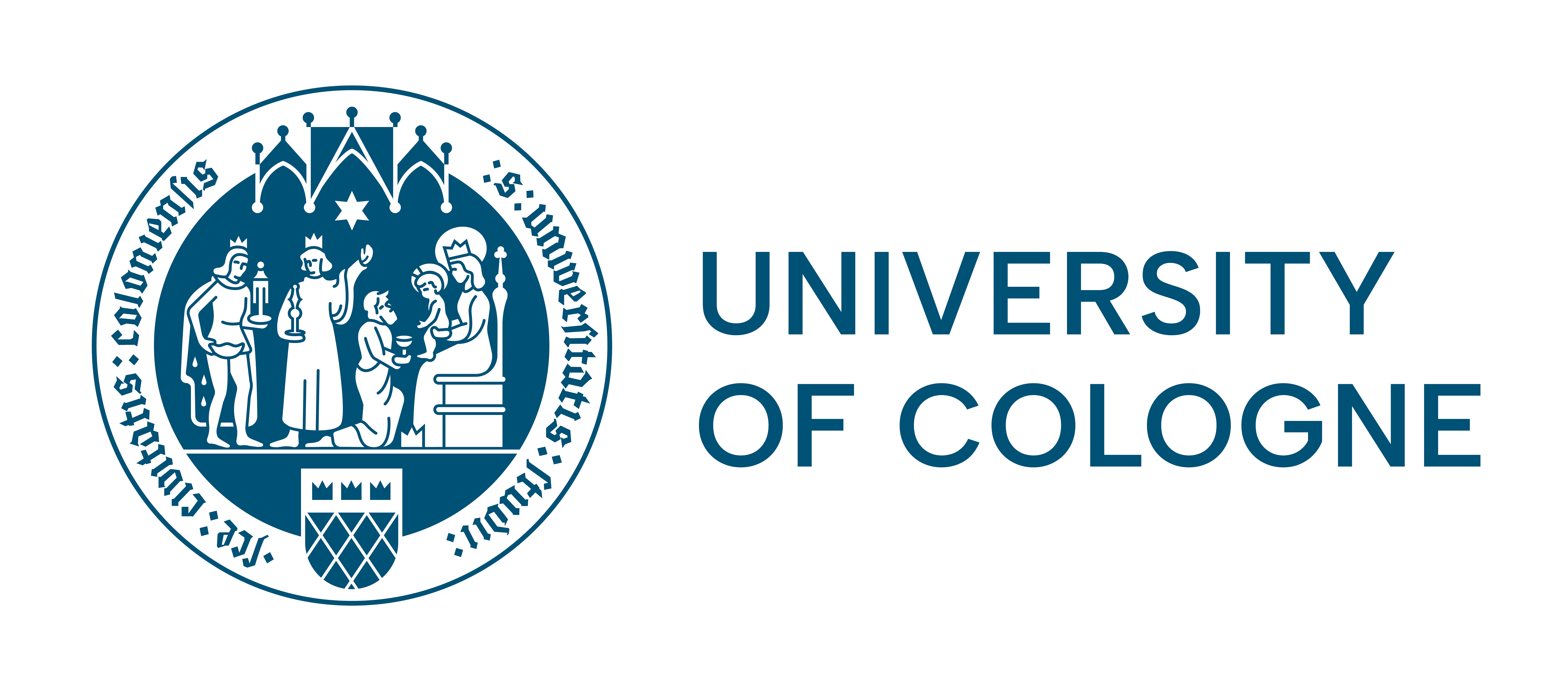
- University seal
- Latin: Universitas Coloniensis
- Type: Public
- Established: 1388; 638 years ago
- Academic affiliations: U15
- Budget: €932 million
- Rector: Joybrato Mukherjee
- Academic staff: 5,035
- Students: 43,594
- Location: Cologne, North Rhine-Westphalia, Germany; 50°55′41″N 6°55′43″E
- Campus: 250 acres (100 ha); Urban
- Website: www.uni-koeln.de
- Location within Germany Location within North Rhine-Westphalia

The University of Cologne (German: Universität zu Köln) is a public research university in Cologne, Germany. It was established in 1388. It closed in 1798 before being re-established in 1919. It is now one of the largest universities in Germany with around 43,594 students. The University of Cologne is a member of the German U15 association of major research-intensive universities and is a "university of excellence" as part of the German Universities Excellence Initiative. It is consistently ranked among the top 20 German universities in the world rankings.

The University of Cologne has five Clusters of Excellence: CECAD Cluster of Excellence for Aging Research, Cluster of Excellence ECONtribute: Markets & Public Policy, CEPLAS Cluster of Excellence for Plant Sciences, ML4Q Cluster of Excellence Matter and Light for Quantum Information and DYNAVERSE Cluster of Excellence. As of 2025, among its notable alumni, faculty and researchers are 5 Nobel Laureates, 11 Gottfried Wilhelm Leibniz Prize winners, 8 Humboldt Professorship winners, and 2 Humboldt Research Awards winners.

== History ==
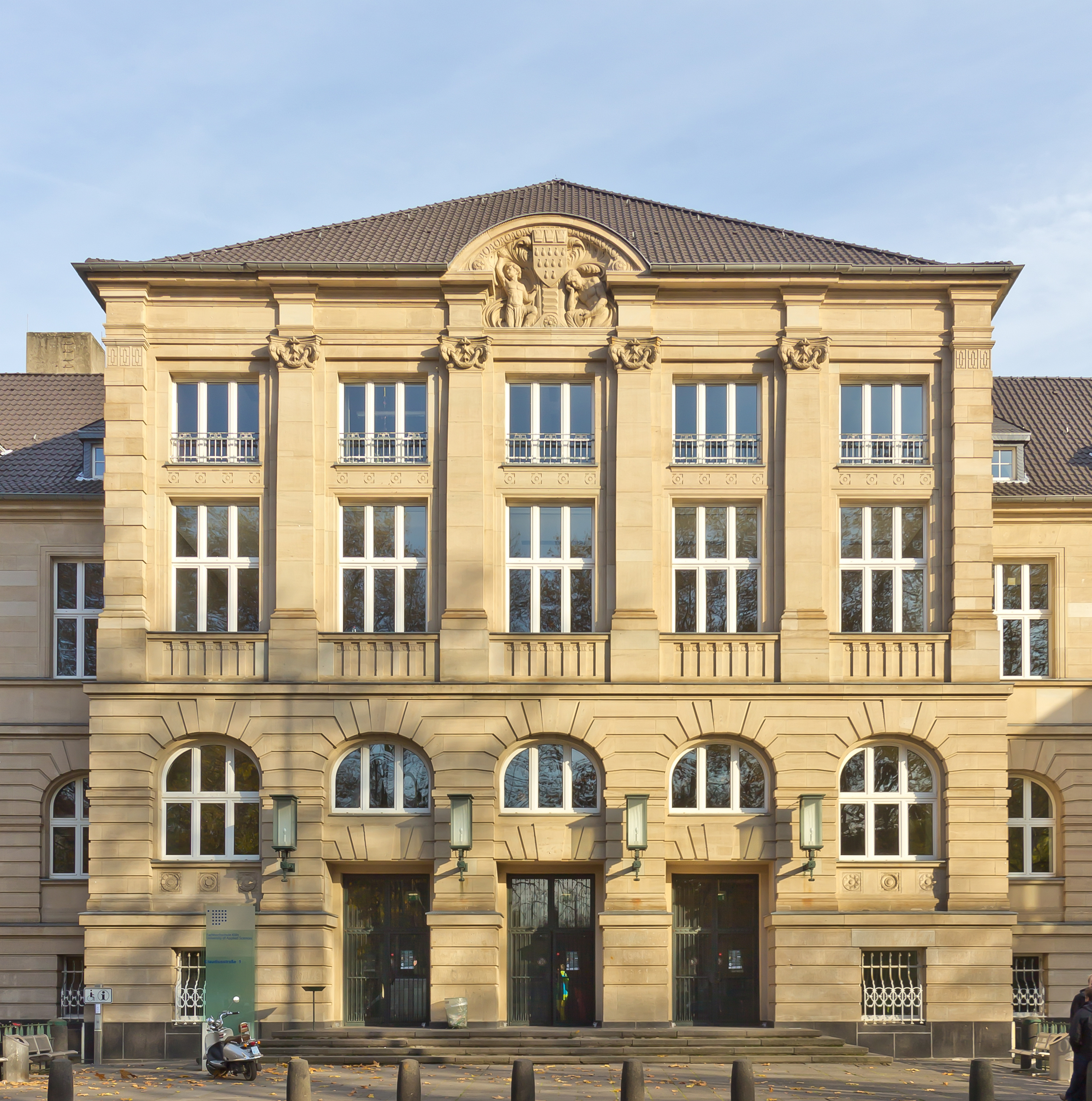
First building of the new university

=== 1388–1798 ===
The University of Cologne was established in 1388 as the fourth university in the Holy Roman Empire, after the Charles University of Prague (1348), the University of Vienna (1365) and the Ruprecht Karl University of Heidelberg (1386). The charter was signed by Pope Urban VI. The university began teaching on 6 January 1389, and operated for several hundred years.

In 1798, the university was abolished by the French First Republic, which had invaded Cologne in 1794, as many universities across France were abolished under the new French constitution. The last rector Ferdinand Franz Wallraf was able to preserve the university's Great Seal, which is now in use again.

=== 1919–today ===
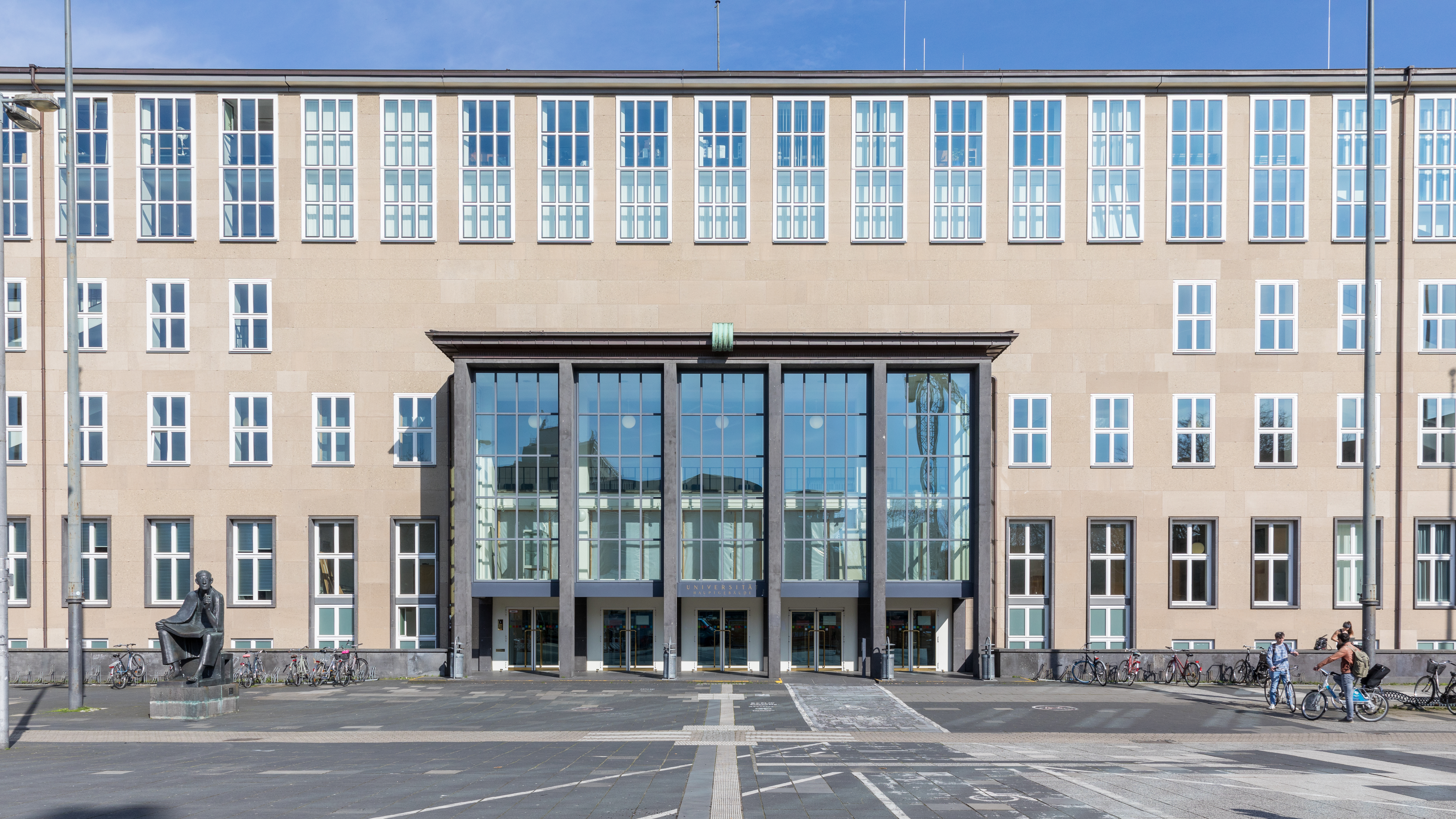
Main building, by architect Adolf Abel, 1934

In 1919, the Prussian government endorsed a decision by the Cologne City Council to re-establish the university. This was considered to be a replacement for the loss of the University of Strasbourg on the west bank of the Rhine, which contemporaneously reverted to France with the rest of Alsace. On 29 May 1919, the Cologne mayor Konrad Adenauer signed the charter of the new university.

At that point, the new university was located in Neustadt-Süd, but relocated to its current campus in Lindenthal on 2 November 1934. The old premises are now being used by the TH Köln – University of Applied Sciences.

Initially, the university was composed of the Faculty of Business, Economics and Social Sciences (successor to the Institutes of Commerce and of Communal and Social Administration) and the Faculty of Medicine (successor to the Academy of Medicine). In 1920, the Faculty of Law and the Faculty of Arts were added, from which the School of Mathematics and Natural Sciences was separated in 1955 to form an independent Faculty. In 1980, the two Cologne departments of the Rhineland School of Education were attached to the university as the Faculties of Education and of Special Education. In 1988, the university became a founding member of the Community of European Management Schools and International Companies (CEMS), today's Global Alliance in Management Education.

The university is regularly ranked at the top of national and international law and business rankings (see Rankings).

== Organization ==
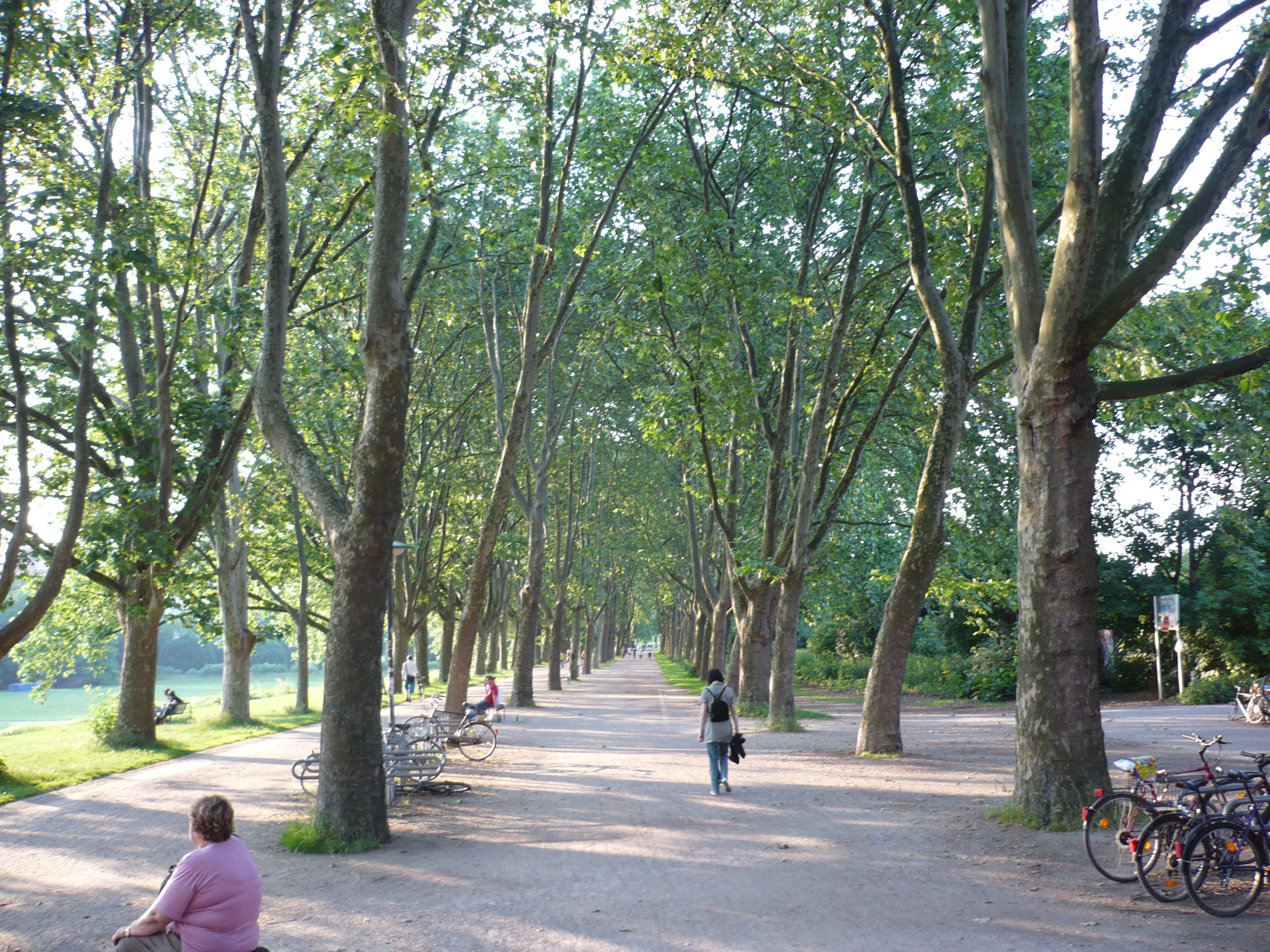
University campus between main building and mensa (the university canteen)

The University of Cologne is a statutory corporation (Körperschaft des öffentlichen Rechts), operated by the Federal State of North Rhine-Westphalia.

=== Faculties ===
The university is divided into six Faculties, which together offer 137 degree programmes. The Faculties are those of Management, Economics and Social Sciences, Law, Medicine (with the affiliated University Hospital Cologne), Arts and Humanities, Mathematics and Natural Sciences and Human Sciences.

Faculty (WS 23/24)	Students
Faculty of Management, Economics and Social Sciences	c. 7,142
Faculty of Law	c. 5,576
Faculty of Medicine with University Hospital of Cologne	c. 4,135
Faculty of Arts and Humanities	c. 11,570
Faculty of Mathematics and Natural Sciences	c. 9,195
Faculty of Human Sciences	c. 7,538

=== Rectors ===
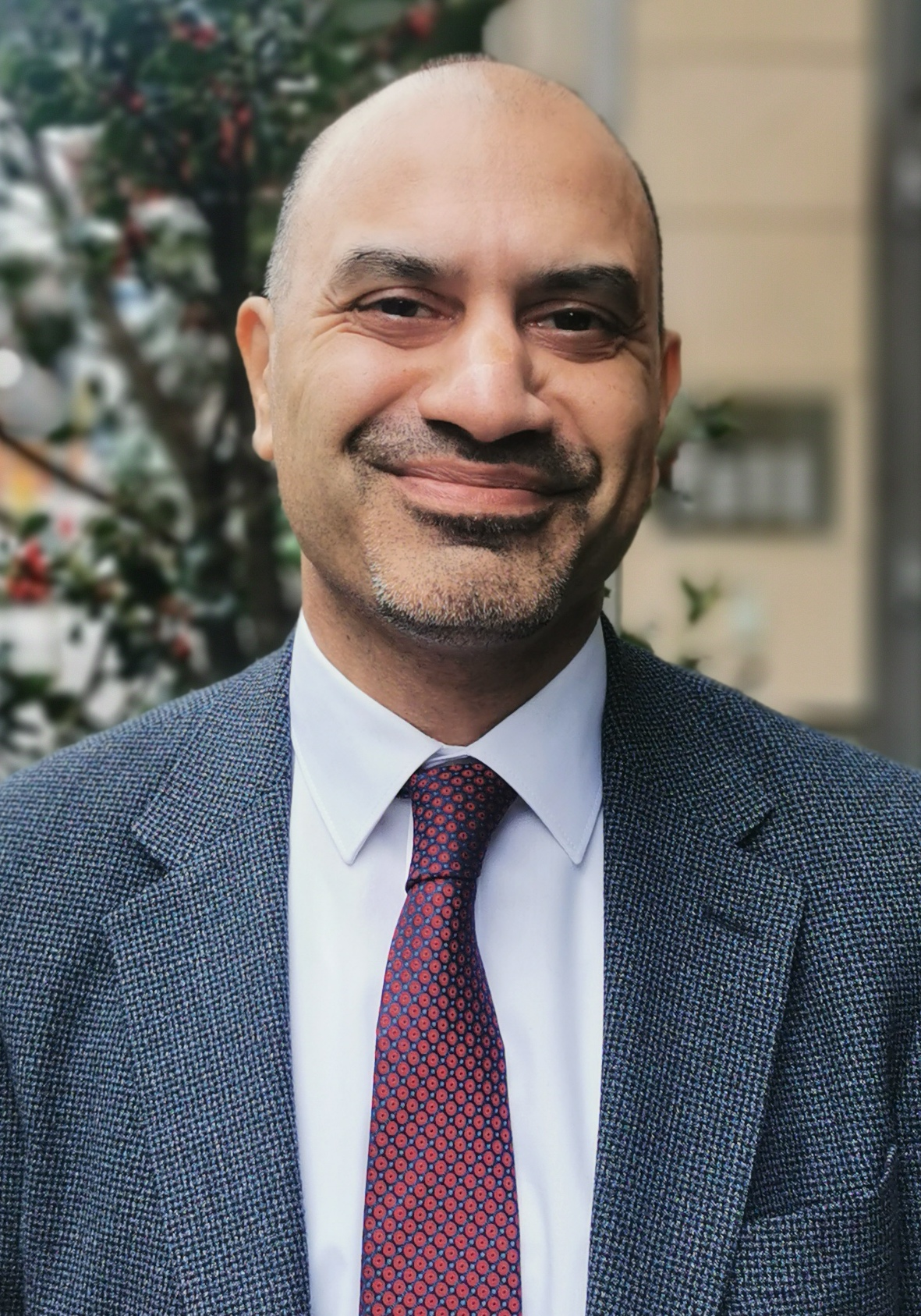
Joybrato Mukherjee, 2024

On 10 May 2023, Joybrato Mukherjee was elected as Rector of the University.

== Profile ==
The University of Cologne is a member of the association German U15 e.V., an association of fifteen major research-intensive and leading medical universities in Germany with a full disciplinary spectrum.

Especially the Faculties of law and economics are renowned and leading in Germany. Leading researchers are affiliated to Cologne, including Angelika Nußberger, Thomas von Danwitz, Claus Kreß, Martin Henssler, Ulrich Preis, Heinz-Peter Mansel.

Apart from these, affiliated persons with the university have won various awards, including the Max Planck Research Award, the Cologne Innovation Prize (City of Cologne), the Postbank Finance Award (Deutsche Postbank), the Ernst Jung Prize in Medicine (Jung Foundation), the SASTRA Ramanujan Prize, the Wilhelm Vaillant Prize (Wilhlem Vaillant Foundation), the Heinz Maier Leibnitz Prize (DFG), the Alfried Krupp Prize for the Advancement of Young Professors, the Innovation Prize of the State of NRW, and the Karl Arnold Prize (North Rhine-Westphalia Academy of Sciences and Arts).

=== Name ===
The university did not have a name for a long time, except for the medieval name universitas studii s[an]c[ta]e civitatis coloniensis (see the university's seal) or the newer description Universität Köln (loosely, Cologne University). Both names emphasized that the university was an institution of the city of Cologne. Josef Kroll proposed the official name Universität zu Köln (loosely, University in Cologne) while he was rector of the university in the early 1930s, and introduced it during his second term of office (1945–1950). The university, which gives some courses in English, is also branded University of Cologne.

=== Organization and faculties ===
The rectorate is responsible for the governance and management of the university. It consists of the rector as chairperson (Joybrato Mukherjee), six Vice-Rectors and the Chancellor (Karsten Gerlof). The rectorate is elected by the University Election Assembly, in which the Senate and the University Council exercise equal voting power; the first term of office is at least six years and subsequent terms of office at least four years. The rector is chairperson of the rectorate and the Senate of the university.

The university is divided into the following six Faculties:

Faculty (WS 23/24)	Students	(New) Founding Year
Faculty of Management, Economics and Social Sciences	7,142	1919
Faculty of Medicine	4,135	1919
Faculty of Law	5,576	1920
Faculty of Arts and Humanities	11,570	1920
Faculty of Mathematics and Natural Sciences	9,195	1955
Faculty of Human Sciences	7,538	2007
Total	45,187	

WS 2023/24, according to the university publication 'Zahlen Daten Fakten 2023' (as of March 2025), main and part-time students, excluding doctoral students, incl. short-term students

On 20 July 2005, the University Senate approved a concept for the reorganization of the Faculties. The concept led to the dissolution of the Faculty of Education and the Faculty of Curative Education and the founding of a new 'sixth' Faculty, the Faculty of Human Sciences. The representatives of the didactic subjects, who had previously worked mainly at the Faculty of Education, were assigned to the Faculties corresponding to their subject as a separate subject group for didactics (for example "Biology and its didactics", "Chemistry and its didactics" as a new didactic subject group at the Faculty of Mathematics and Natural Sciences), while the new Faculty of Human Sciences mainly retained the pedagogical, curative education and psychology subjects or transferred them from the Faculty of Arts and Humanities and the Faculty of Education. The reorganization of the Faculties was officially implemented on 1 January 2007 with the establishment of the corresponding committees. In 2010, the Center for Teacher Education was founded, which was given extensive responsibilities in the organization and coordination of teacher training degree programmes as part of the restructuring of teacher training in North Rhine-Westphalia.

=== Special funding for research ===
Clusters of Excellence / Excellence Strategy of the German federal and state governments:

- CECAD Cologne Excellence Cluster for Aging and Aging-Associated Diseases
- CEPLAS Cluster of Excellence on Plant Sciences
- DYNAVERSE Our Dynamic Universe (from 1 January 2026)
- ECONtribute: Märkte & Public Policy
- ML4Q Matter and Light for Quantum Computing

Adenauer School of Government:

On 5 June 2025, the University of Cologne and the non-profit Alfred Landecker Foundation, founded by the Reimann family, signed a cooperation agreement to establish the Adenauer School of Government (ASG). The aim of the ASG is to establish itself as a leading, non-partisan center for public policy, governance and administrative sciences that helps to shape relevant developments in economics and other research fields. The school will be funded in long term, with an initial budget of ten million euros per year.

==== DFG ====
- 18 DFG Collaborative Research Centres and 10 participations in Collaborative Research Centres at other universities (as of October 2024)
  - CRC 1211: Earth - Evolution at the Dry Limit
  - CRC 1218: Mitochondrial Regulation of Cellular Function
  - CRC 1238: Control and Dynamics of Quantum Materials
  - CRC 1252: Prominence in Language
  - CRC 1310: Predictability in Evolution
  - CRC 1399: Mechanisms of Drug Sensitivity and Resistance in Small Cell Lung Cancer
  - CRC 1403: Cell Death in Immunity, Inflammation and Disease
  - CRC 1451: Key Mechanisms of Motor Control in Health and Disease
  - CRC 1530: Elucidation and Targeting of Pathogenic Mechanisms in B Cell Malignancies
  - CRC 1601: Habitats of Massive Stars Across Cosmic Time
  - CRC 1607: Towards immunomodulatory and Anti(lymph)angiogenic Therapies for Age-Related Blinding Eye Diseases
  - CRC 1678: Systems-Level Consequences of Fidelity Changes in mRNA and Protein Biosynthesis
  - CRC TRR 183: Entangled States of Matter
  - CRC TRR 228: Future Rural Africa: Future-making and Social-Ecological Transformation
  - CRC TRR 341: Plant Ecological Genetics
- 6 DFG Research Training Groups (see Graduate Programmes)
  - a.r.t.e.s. Graduate School for the Humanities (Faculty of Arts and Humanities)
  - Department-wide Graduate School (Faculty of Mathematics and Natural Sciences)
  - Cologne Graduate School in Management, Economics and Social Sciences (CGS) (Faculty of Management, Economics and Social Sciences)
  - Graduate School Managing Diversity & Transition (Faculty of Human Sciences)
  - Graduate School of the Faculty of Medicine
  - Graduate School of the Faculty of Law

==== EU ====
- EUniWell
- ERC Grants

==== Central graduate schools ====
- a.r.t.e.s. Graduate School for the Humanities
- Graduate School for Biological Sciences
- Cologne Graduate School Chemistry (CGSC)
- Graduate School of Geosciences (GSGS)
- Graduate School of Mathematics
- Bonn-Cologne Graduate School of Physics and Astronomy (BCGS)
- Interdisciplinary Program Health Sciences (IPHS)
- Graduate School of Human Medicine and Dentistry (GSHZ)
- Interdisciplinary Program Molecular Medicine (IPMM)
- Graduate School of the Faculty of Law
- Cologne Graduate School in Management, Economics and Social Sciences (CGS)
- Graduate School of the Faculty of Human Sciences
- Graduate School for Teacher Education

==== Cooperation with major research institutions ====
Some University of Cologne professors are also members of major research institutions:

- German Aerospace Centre (DLR)
- Forschungszentrum Jülich in the Helmholtz Association
- DZNE – German Center for Neurodegenerative Diseases (Helmholtz)
- ZB Med – German National Library of Medicine
- GESIS – Leibniz Institute for the Social Sciences
- German Institute for Adult Education – Leibniz Centre for Lifelong Learning (DIE)
- Max Planck Institute for Neurological Research (MPINF)

==== University Award for outstanding achievements ====
Each year, the University of Cologne recognizes outstanding achievements in the categories research, teaching and learning as well as administration.

==== Schmittmann Wahlen Scholarship ====
This scholarship is awarded to doctoral candidates. The scholarship is awarded in honour of professor Benedikt Schmittmann (1872–1939), a professor at the University of Cologne.

==== Gerhard Michel Scholarship ====
In 2003, a former employee in the International Office, who was responsible for studies abroad, set up a university scholarship fund; thanks to donations from former international scholarship holders and friends of internationalization, scholarships can be awarded annually for study visits at partner universities that offer a fee waiver.

==== Cologne University Foundation ====
The Cologne University Foundation was established in 2019 to promote early-career researchers, research and academic projects. The foundation manages private donations to the university, which promote the transfer of knowledge to society.

==== Third-party funding ====
The volume of third-party funding was 239.2 million euros in 2023, of which 103.9 million euros was allocated to the Faculty of Medicine. The German Research Foundation was by far the largest provider of third-party funding with around 101.5 million euros. Other third-party funders in 2023 were the EU (16.9 million euros), the federal government (42.8 million euros), the state of North Rhine-Westphalia (21.7 million euros), foundations (17.2 million euros), industry (29.9 million euros) and other third-party funders (9.2 million euros).

==== Endowed professorships ====
The university has acquired a number of endowed professorships, some of which have been established on a long-term basis or only for a few years and are then funded by the state.

- Bayer endowed professorship for Technical Chemistry, since 1986
- Endowed professorship for Tumour Immunology of the German Cancer Aid, since 2002
- Endowed professorship for Palliative Medicine, funded by the German Cancer Aid, since October 2005
- Alfried Krupp von Bohlen und Halbach Professorship for Ancient History, since 2006 for 7 years
- Endowed professorship for Energy Industry, financed by the energy industry, April 2007 to February 2012
- The Albertus Magnus Professorship was established by Senate resolution in 2004. Every year, a renowned international scholar or scientist is invited to give public lectures and seminars for one to two weeks.
- Endowed professorship for the promotion of lawyer-oriented legal training, financed by the Hans Soldan Foundation, since 2014

=== Teaching ===
The University of Cologne is a research-orientated comprehensive university. With 137 degree programmes, the university offers a wide range of study and research opportunities. The teaching degree programmes make up a total of around 45%. The largest degree programmes are Law, Human Medicine and Business Administration.

In January 2022, the University of Cologne published its mission statement teaching and learning, which describes the university's ambitions and serves as a basis for the further development of teaching and learning offers. Based on the mission statement for teaching and learning, the University of Cologne has developed a quality management system that involves and is shaped by all status groups. The Accreditation Council awarded a 'System Accreditation' quality seal to the University of Cologne for its QM system that serves to regularly evaluate and further develop the university's degree programmes. The Vice-Rectorate for Teaching and Studies is headed by Beatrix Busse.

=== Student representation ===
The students of the university are represented by student members in the various university committees, such as the Senate. These members are directly elected in annual elections or appointed by directly elected members from higher-level bodies. Due to the legal requirements of Section 11 subsection 2 of the Higher Education Act NRW, students do not form a majority in most committees and can be outvoted by professorial members and other status groups.

In contrast, the constituted student body is a statutory body under public law of the university and represents student interests. The central bodies are the student parliament with its 51 elected members and the student union (AStA) appointed by it as the executive body. The most important tasks of the student body are to represent the student interests in the university and society, to participate in the political discourse of the university and to promote culture, sport and political education. In order to fulfil these tasks, the student body levies a fee from the students, which is collected together with the fee for the Kölner Studierendenwerk as a course and tuition fee. In the winter semester 2024/25, this amounted to €304.25, of which about 36% was allocated to the Studierendenwerk and 58% to the semester ticket; the AStA is responsible for negotiating the price of the semester ticket with the Kölner Verkehrs-Betriebe (KVB). The remaining 6% was distributed by the student body to its own projects and salaries as well as to University Sport Cologne. The AStA offers a wide range of services, including counselling and complaints offices, a bicycle repair shop, a tool rental service, the campus garden and countless cultural and informative events such as lectures, museum tours, the long study nights and the 'festival contre le racisme'.

In addition to the general representation of student interests, the student body also has several autonomous departments such as the autonomous parents' department or the autonomous internationals' department; these departments represent special status groups within the student body.

At Faculty level, the student associations look after the interests of their respective students. Depending on the Faculty, there is either joint student association for all students in the Faculty or a two-tier system consisting of a departmental and a Faculty representation. In addition to providing subject-specific advice and representing students' interests to lecturers, providing support to first-semester students is one of the main tasks of the student associations.

=== Internationalization ===
The International Office is responsible for the university's international relations (offering support for international students and visiting scholars and scientists, study and research opportunities abroad, university partnerships, international marketing) at university level and the Centres for International Relations at Faculty level (centralized-decentralized organizational concept).

The university has been operating an office in Beijing since the beginning of 2007 (official inauguration in May 2007). The office is located at the DAAD German Centre and represents the China-NRW University Alliance. The University of Cologne has taken on the task of coordinating academic contacts with China from the state of North Rhine-Westphalia. The office will make it easier for members of the consortium to expand their work in China and provide local support. The University of Cologne heads this consortium. The university has further regional offices in New York City and in New Delhi and coordination offices in Cairo and Accra.

==== Number and proportion of international students (including educational residents) ====
The number of international students in the winter semester 2023/24 was 5,074 (excluding doctoral students). This corresponds to around 11% of the total number of students.

==== University partnerships and networks ====
The university maintains over 40 official partnerships. In addition to the official university partnerships, there are almost 300 cooperations and exchange relationships with renowned universities all over the world at the level of the individual Faculties and departments.

Extensive funding opportunities are available through the Erasmus programme of the EU, the DAAD or fee waivers agreements with partner universities (complete list of partner universities on the university website). In 2005, the University of Cologne took over the central mediation and coordination of relations between the higher education institutions of North Rhine-Westphalia and China.

==== Award for the support of international students ====
In 2004, the university was awarded the Federal Foreign Office's prize for special services to the support of international students for its centralized and decentralized organizational concept, based on the Centre for International Relations at the Faculty of Management, Economics and Social Sciences.

==== Humboldt Rankings ====
During the years 2018 through 2022, 142 international scholars and scientists sponsored by the Humboldt Foundation chose to spend their research years at the University of Cologne.

=== Budget and finances ===
The total budget of the University of Cologne (including the Faculty of Medicine) amounted to 920 million euros in 2023 (of which 263.7 million euros is allocated to the Faculty of Medicine). The budget was made up of 426.8 million euros in state funds, 239.2 million euros in third-party funding, 120.5 million euros in special funds such as QVM or HSP and 53.5 million euros in other income.

=== Gender equality ===
The University of Cologne was awarded the title 'Total E-Quality' in 2004, 2007, 2014, 2018 and 2022 for its equal opportunities and diversity strategy. The title honours companies as well as higher education institutions and research institutions that successfully implement strategies promoting equal opportunities through HR and institutional measures. In addition, the university holds the 'family-friendly university' and 'shaping diversity' certificates from the Stifterverband, received the seal of approval for fair and transparent appointment procedures from the German Association of University Professors and Lecturers in 2021 and was awarded 'LGBTIQ+ Diversity Champion 2021'.

=== Sustainability ===
The University of Cologne adopted its university-wide sustainability strategy in June 2023. It anchors the university's commitment to sustainability in the fields of research, teaching & learning, commitment & transfer as well as in organization & operations. The Vice-Rectorate for Sustainability, which has existed since October 2023, is headed by Kirk W. Junker. The university is a member of DG HochN (German Society for Sustainability at Higher Education Institutions) and Humboldt^{n}, the sustainability initiative of the higher education institutions in North Rhine-Westphalia. In addition, it has been awarded the title 'Fairtrade University' since 2018.

=== Rankings ===
University rankings

Overall – Global & National
QS World 2024	268	17
THE World 2024	160	15
ARWU World 2023	151-200	6-9

The University of Cologne regularly participates in the most important international and national rankings. According to the QS World University Rankings, the university held the 268th position globally and the 17th position nationally in 2024. The Times Higher Education World University Rankings for 2023 saw the university at the 160th place globally and 15th place at the national level. In the Academic Ranking of World Universities, more commonly known as the ARWU rankings, the university was ranked within the 151–200 range globally and between 6th and 9th in the national ranking in 2022.

The University of Cologne also regularly performs well in national rankings. For example, the DFG Funding Atlas, which shows the universities with the highest DFG grants, shows an improvement of ten places since 2006 to 8th place in 2021. In addition, the Humboldt Rankings show that the University of Cologne is a favourite research location for international scholars and scientists who have been sponsored by the Humboldt Foundation.

==== International rankings by subject ====
QS World University Rankings by Subject 2023
Subject	Global	National
Arts & Humanities	▲156	▼9–10
Linguistics	101–150	4–10
Archaeology	51–100	6–8
Classics and Ancient History	▲24	▲5
English Language and Literature	251–300	▲10–12
History	151–200	9–12
Modern Languages	▼201–250	▲10–13
Philosophy	▲101–150	▼8–12
Engineering and Technology	N/A	N/A
Life Sciences & Medicine	▼185	▲10
Biological Sciences	▼144	▼11
Medicine	151–200	▲8–13
Psychology	151–200	8–9
Natural Sciences	N/A	N/A
Geography	151–200	▲8–10
Social Sciences & Management	▲246	9
Accounting and Finance	201–250	▲6–7
Anthropology	101–150	▲6–7
Business and Management Studies	▼251–300	▼9
Communication and Media Studies	201–250	9–10
Economics and Econometrics	151–200	▲5–8
Law and Legal Studies	201–250	9–12
Sociology	▼151–200	▼9–11

THE World University Rankings by Subject 2023
Subject	Global	National
Arts & humanities	▼85	▲7
Business & economics	▲201–250	▲10–14
Education	▲151–175	9–10
Law	151–175	7–8
Social sciences	▼176–200	▼9–13
Clinical & health	▼201–250	▼12–16
Life sciences	101–125	11–12
Physical sciences	251–300	▼22–26
Psychology	126–150	▼14–16

ARWU Global Ranking of Academic Subjects 2022
Subject	Global	National
Natural Sciences
Physics	201–300	▲13–23
Chemistry	301–400	26–30
Earth Sciences	101–150	▼5–12
Geography	151–200	8–13
Atmospheric Science	151–200	▲11–14
Engineering
Materials Science & Engineering	401–500	▲22–30
Biotechnology	201–300	▼14–25
Life Sciences
Biological Sciences	76–100	▼6–11
Human Biological Sciences	101–150	▼13–20
Agricultural Sciences	▼151–200	▼9–18
Medical Sciences
Clinical Medicine	201–300	14–22
Public Health	301–400	▲12–22
Dentistry & Oral Sciences	201–300	▲22–28
Medical Technology	▲51–75	▼9–12
Pharmacy & Pharmaceutical Sciences	▼301–400	▼24–29
Social Sciences
Economics	▼151–200	▼6–8
Law	201–300	▼3–7
Political Sciences	101–150	5–7
Sociology	▲35	1
Education	▼201–300	▼8–15
Communication	▼151–200	▲11–14
Psychology	101–150	▲5–11
Business Administration	101–150	1–2
Management	▼151–200	▼2–3

== Museums and collections ==
- GeoMuseum: The only natural history museum in Cologne
- Theatre Collection in Schloss Wahn: images and text from European theater from the 16th century
- Max Bruch Archive of the Institute of Musicology: autographs and writings from and about Max Bruch
- The Kathy Acker Reading Room, the personal library of author Kathy Acker.
- Musical Instrument Collection of the Musicology Institute
- Egyptian collection: Papyri and parchments, ceramics and small sculptures
- Prehistoric collection artefacts from all periods of prehistoric and early history also from foreign sites, from the Neanderthal fist to the bronze sword and iron weapons of the early Middle Ages
- Papyrus collection of the Institute of Antiquity
- Barbarastollen: Under the main building, a mining gallery was built as part of a museum for trade and industry in 1932
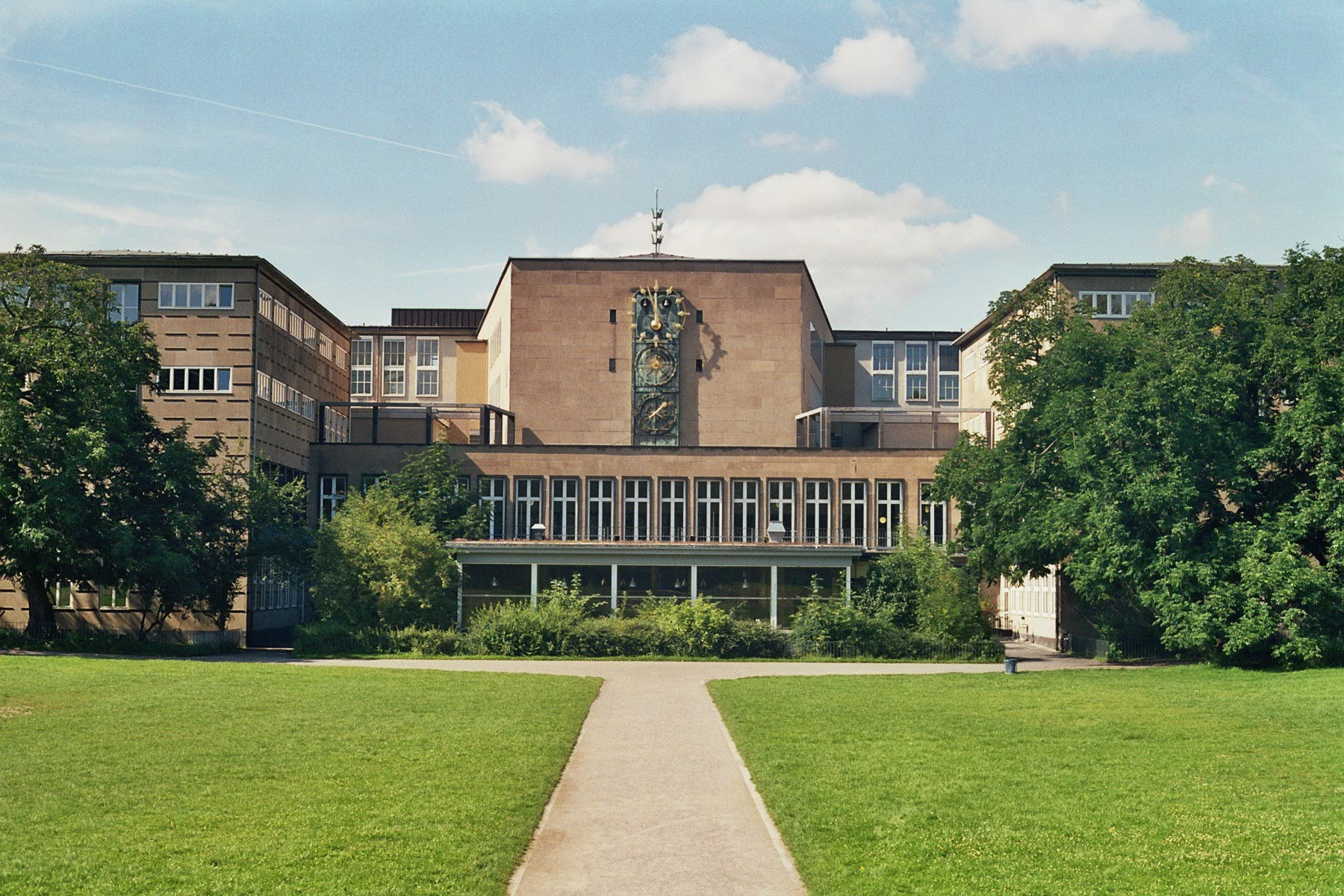
Main building (east view)

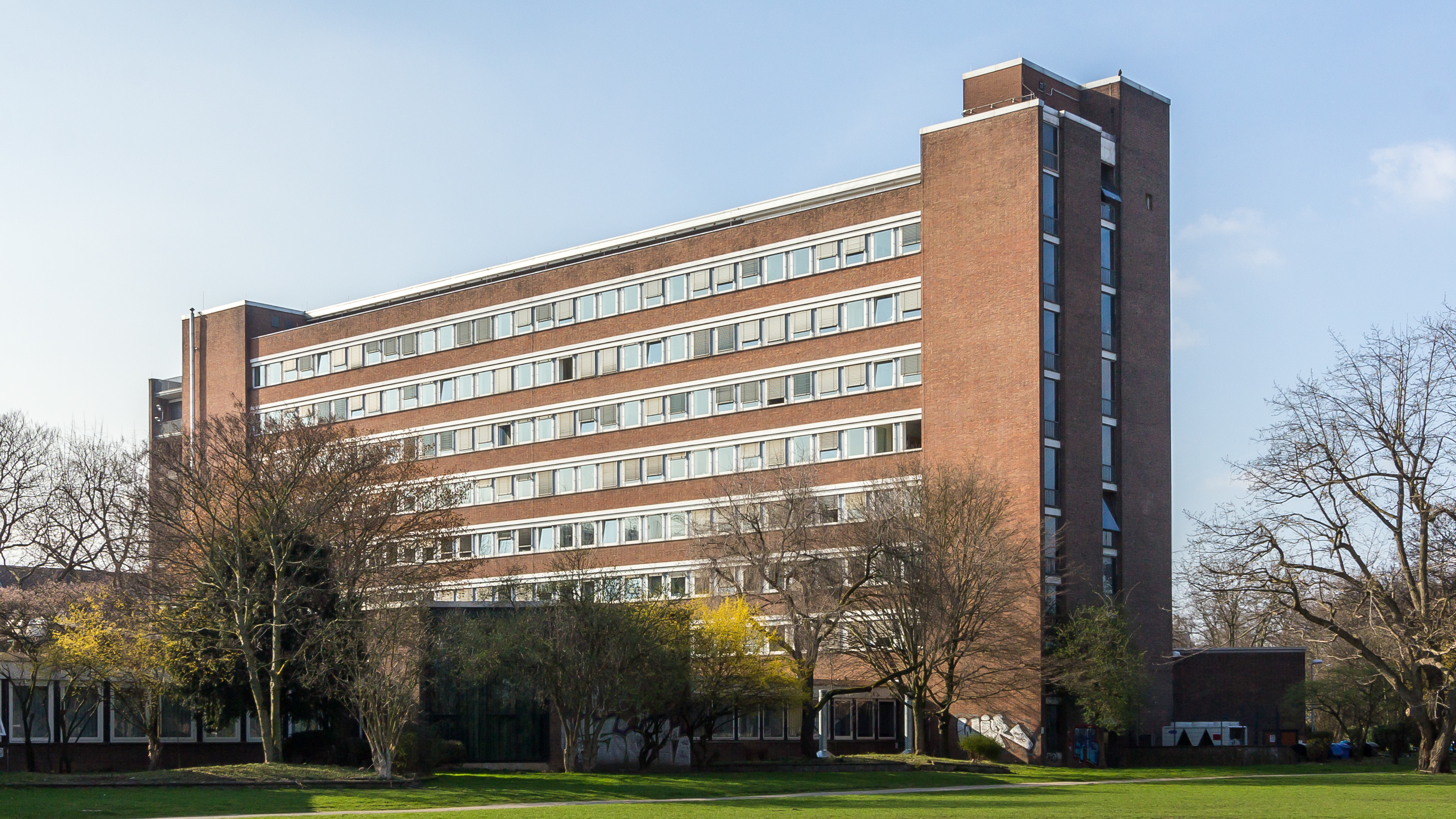
Building of the WiSo Faculty

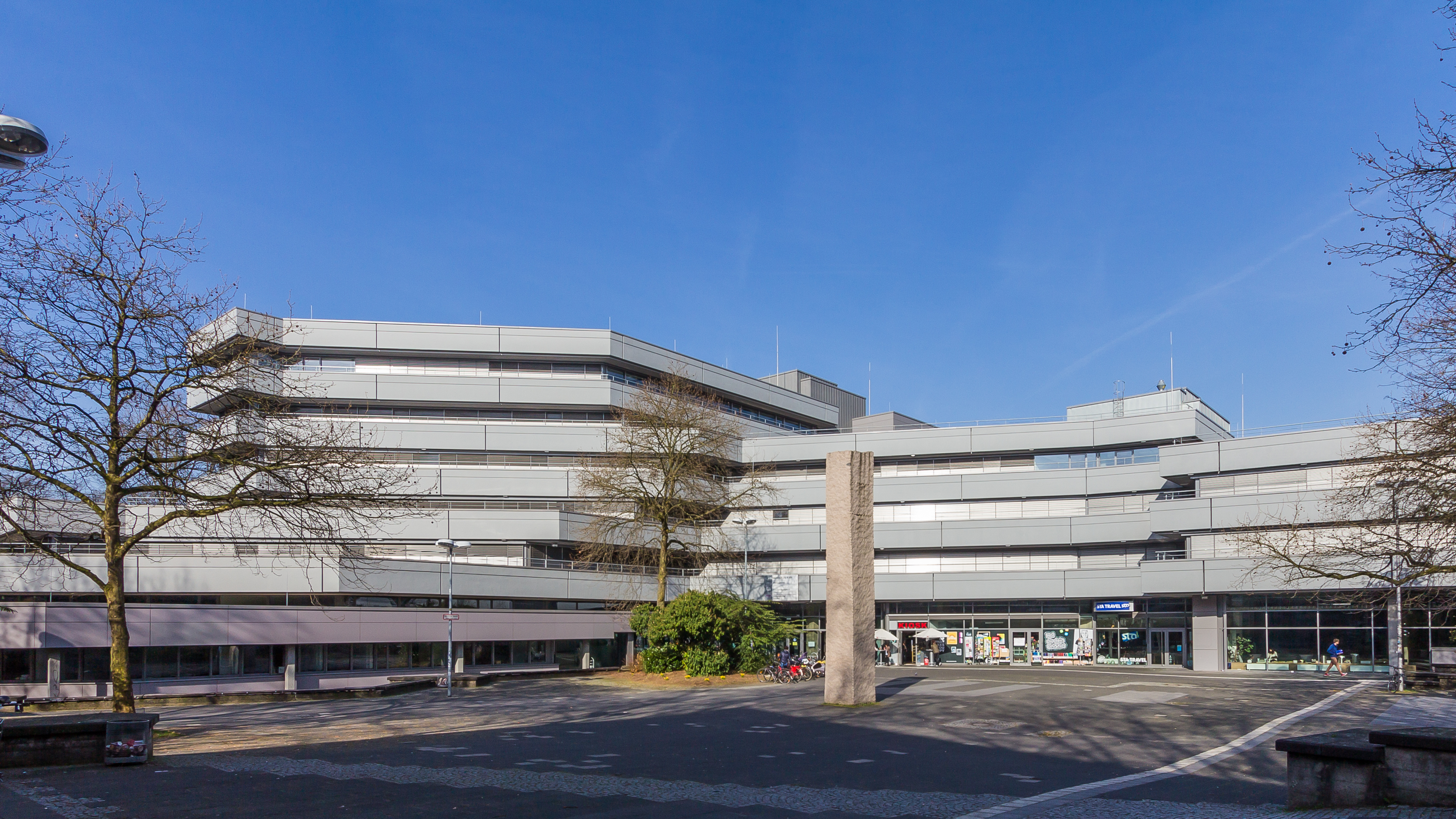
Building of the Faculty of Philosophy

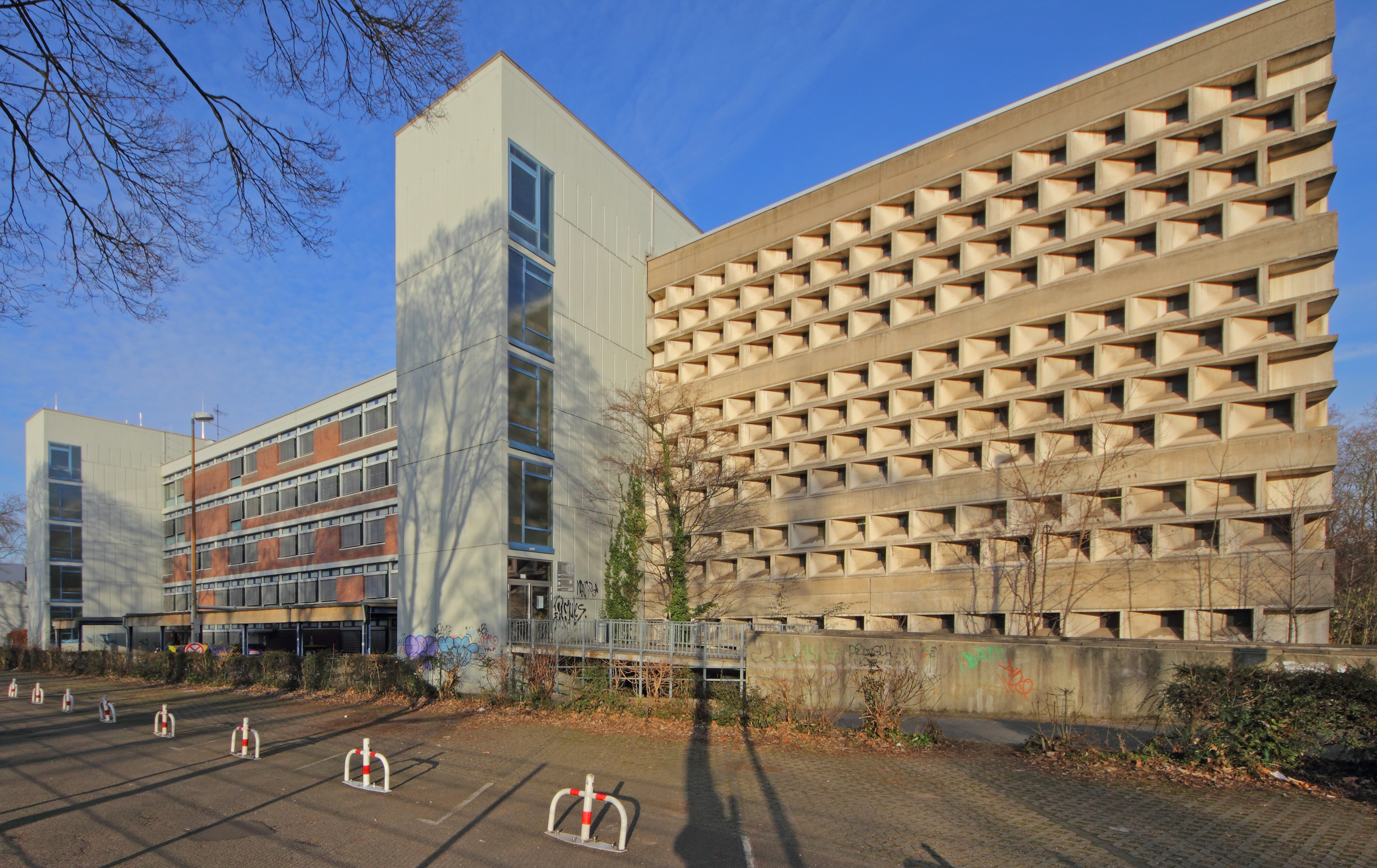
The building of the university and City Library of Cologne

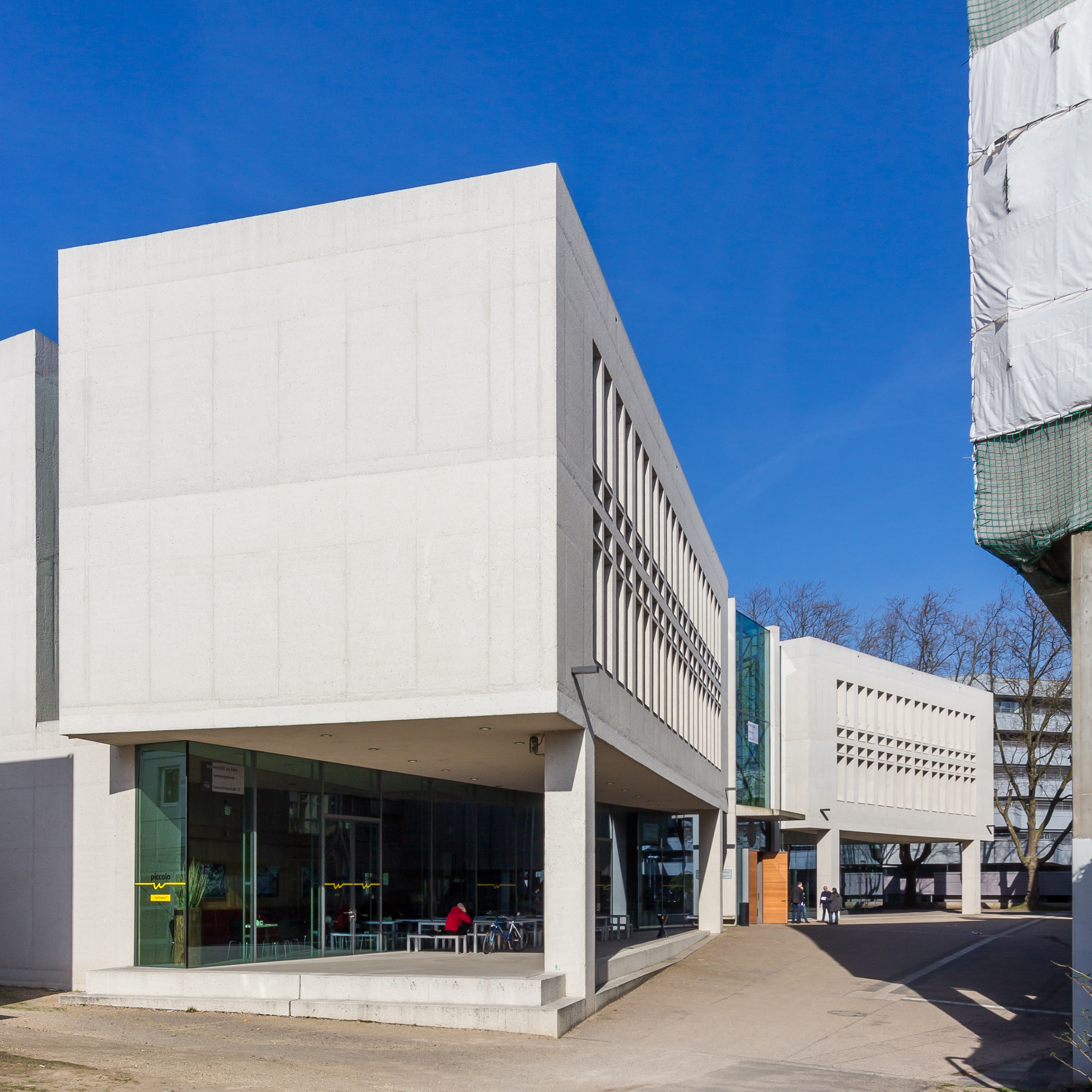
The seminar building (built in 2009 by Paul Böhm )

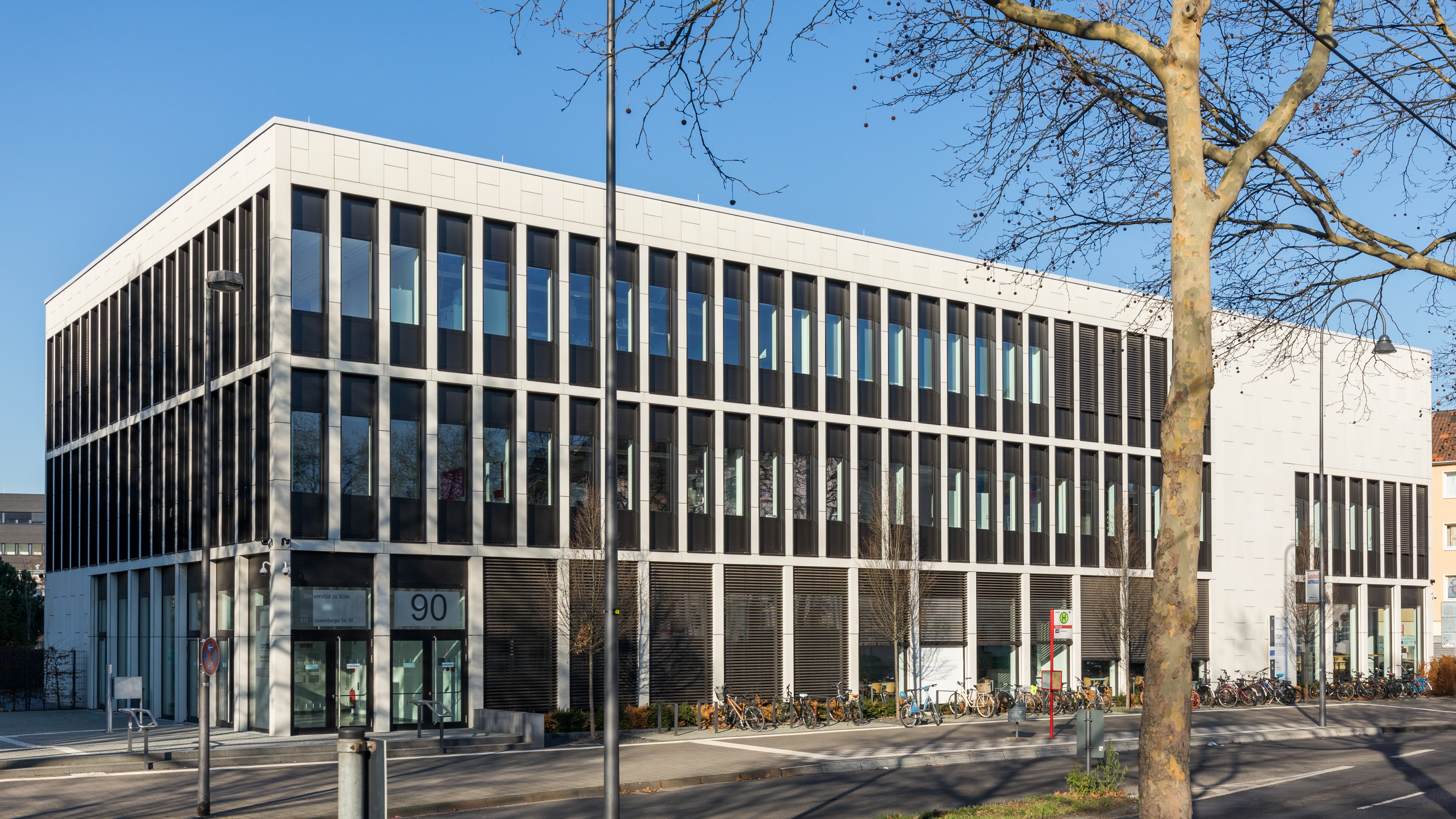
Building of the Center for Organic Electronics (COPT)

== Students and faculty ==
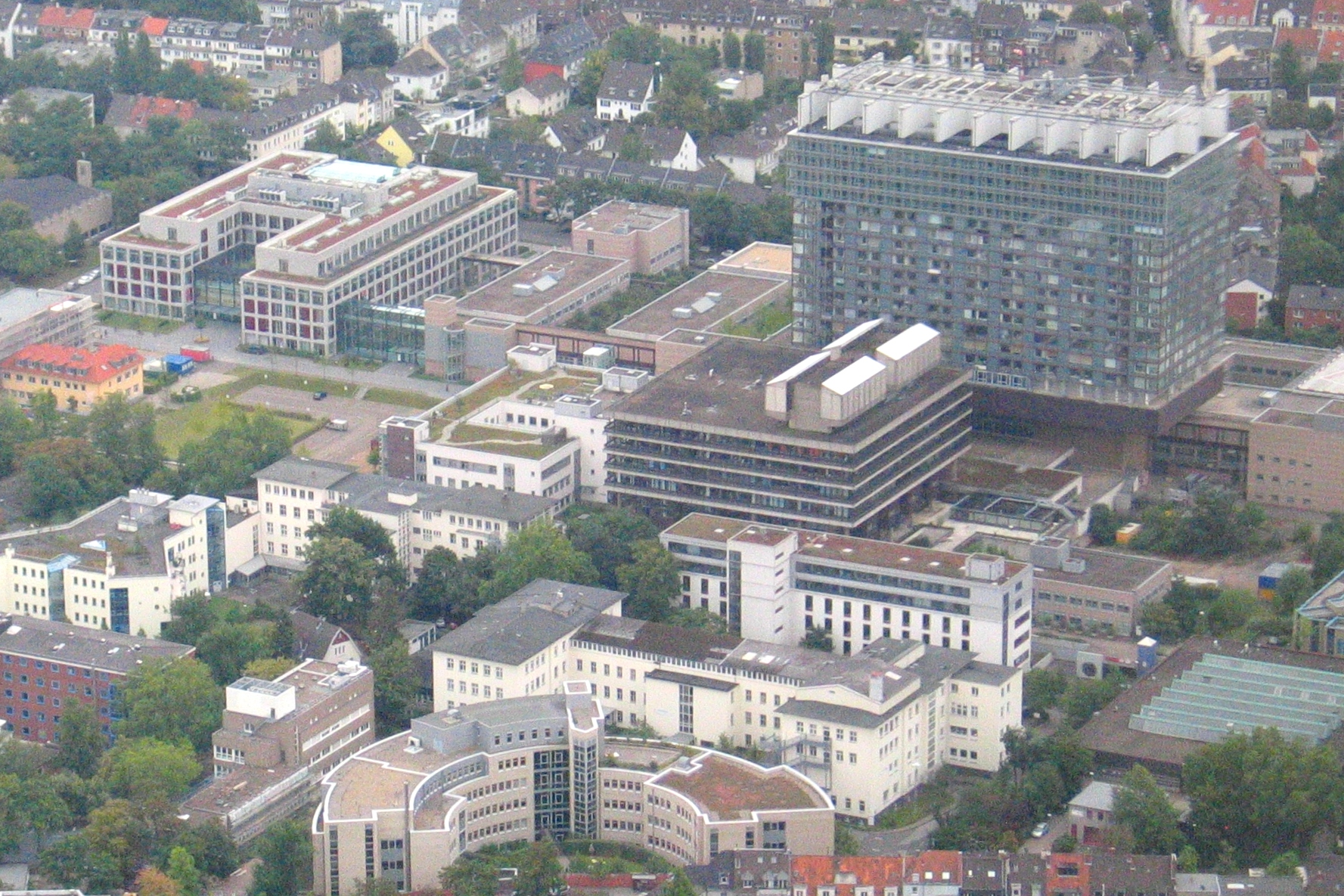
Campus of the Cologne University Hospital in Lindenthal

In 2023, the university enrolled 45,187 students. 6,941 Students earned their graduate or undergraduate degrees in 2023.

There were 5,074 students with non-German citizenship in the 2023 Summer Semester. The largest contingents of first year students came from Turkey (12.4%), Italy (7.5%), China (7.2%), Russia (4.6%) and Luxembourg (4,4%).

There are 616 professors at the university, 32% of the professors are female. Including the professors the university employs a total of 4,667 research assistants.

== Partner universities ==
The University of Cologne maintains eighty-eight official partnerships with universities from ten countries. Of these, the partnerships with Clermont-Ferrand I and Pennsylvania State are the oldest partnerships. In addition, Cologne has further cooperations with more than 260 other universities.

- Federal University of Ceará, Fortaleza, Brazil (since 1990)
- Sofia University St. Kliment Ohridski, Sofia, Bulgaria (since 1985)
- Sun Yat-sen University, Guangzhou, Guangdong, China (since 2005)
- Fudan University, Shanghai, China (since 2010)
- Université d'Auvergne, Clermont-Ferrand I, France (since 1962)
- Université Blaise Pascal, Clermont-Ferrand II, France (since 1980)
- Aristotle University of Thessaloniki, Thessaloniki, Greece (since 1992)
- National Law School of India University, Bangalore, India
- Hitotsubashi University, Tokyo, Japan (since 1987)
- Keio University, Tokyo, Japan (since 1981)
- University of Wrocław, Wrocław, Poland (since 2003)
- University of Rajshahi, Rajshahi, Bangladesh
- Jagiellonian University, Kraków, Poland (since 1990)
- Maxim Gorky Literature Institute, Moscow, Russia
- Volgograd State University, Russia (since 1993)
- University of Seville, Spain
- Charles University, Prague, Czech Republic (since 1999)
- Istanbul University, Istanbul, Turkey (since 2003)
- University of California at Berkeley, School of Law, Berkeley, CA, U.S.
- Duquesne University, Pittsburgh, PA, U.S. (since 2001)
- Pennsylvania State University, State College, PA, U.S. (since 1961)

== Notable alumni and professors ==
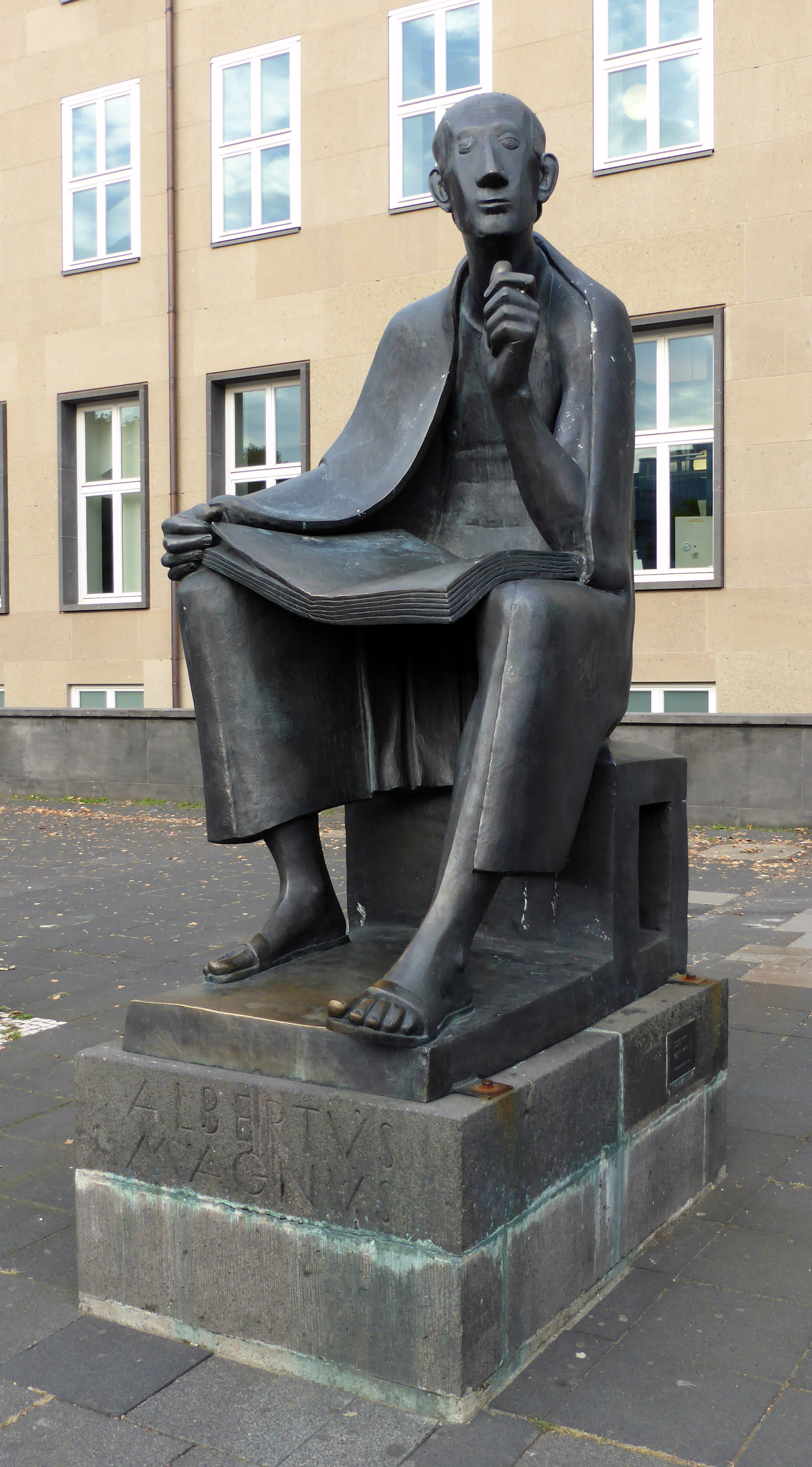
Albertus Magnus monument in front of the main building

- Ugur Sahin (co-founder and CEO of BioNTech)
- Albertus Magnus
- Thomas Aquinas
- Kurt Alder (Nobel Prize in Chemistry 1950)
- Eberhard Becker (Rector of University of Dortmund from 2002 to 2008)
- Marianne Bielschowsky, German-born Spanish-New Zealand biochemist
- Peter Grünberg (Nobel Prize in Physics 2007)
- Heinrich Böll (Nobel Prize for Literature)
- Karl Carstens (president of the Federal Republic of Germany 1979–1984)
- Gustav Heinemann (president of the Federal Republic of Germany 1969 to 1974)
- Benjamin List (Nobel Prize in Chemistry 2021)
- Karolos Papoulias, Greek politician (former president of the Hellenic Republic)
- Martin Broszat (1926–1989), historian
- Ute Deichmann, historian and professor of modern life sciences
- Bijan Djir-Sarai (born 1976), Iranian-born German politician
- Amos Grunebaum, American obstetrician and gynecologist
- Dirk M. Guldi, chemist
- Jenny Gusyk, a Jewish woman of Turkish citizenship, was the first female and foreign student to be enrolled in 1919.
- Erich Gutenberg (founder of modern German business studies)
- Sasa Hanten-Schmidt, lawyer and publicist
- Leonhard Harding, (born 1936), historian and scholar in African studies
- Andreas Kaplan, economist
- Hans Mayer (1907–2001), literary scholar
- Stephan Noller (born 1970), internet-entrepreneur, founder and former committee chairman
- Axel Ockenfels, economist
- Ernst Alfred Philippson (1900–1993), philologist
- Barbara Stollberg-Rilinger (born 1955), historian
- Katja Terlau (born 1970), art historian and provenance researcher
- Eberhard Voit, scholar and biologist and professor at the Georgia Institute of Technology
- Eberhard Wagner, linguist and author

== In popular culture ==
The University of Cologne was commemorated on the Federal Republic of Germany's postage stamp in 1988, celebrating university's 600 years.

== See also ==
- List of medieval universities
