= Dirk M. Guldi =

- Born: May 27, 1963 (age 63); Germany
- Occupations: Chemist, academic and author

Academic background
- Education: University of Koln; Ben-Gurion University of the Negev

Dirk M. Guldi is a German chemist, academic, and author. He is a full professor at Friedrich-Alexander-University Erlangen-Nürnberg, an adjunct professor at Xi'an University of Science and Technology and Huazhong University of Science and Technology, as well as a partner investigator at the Intelligent Polymer Research Institute at the University of Wollongong.

Guldi is most known for his work on photon- and charge management in solar energy conversion and storage, that is, light-driven charge transfer and transport schemes in molecules and nanometer-scale materials. Among his authored works are his publications in academic journals, including Nature, Journal of the American Chemical Society and Angewandte Chemie as well as books such as The Exciting World of Nanocages and Nanotubes, and Carbon Nanotubes and Related: Structures Synthesis, Characterization, Functionalization, and Applications. He has co-chaired the Gordon Research Conference on Electron Donor-Acceptor Interactions and Photochemistry in 2016 and 2019, respectively.

Guldi holds the position of co-editor-in-chief for the journals Nanoscale and Nanoscale Advances. Additionally, he also serves as the editor of Photochem.

== Education ==
Guldi earned his Bachelor of Science in Chemistry from the University of Koln in 1986, followed by a Master of Science degree in chemistry from the same institution in 1988. He completed his PhD in 1990 from the University of Koln and Ben-Gurion University of the Negev. Later in 1999, he obtained his Habilitation at Leipzig University.

== Career ==
Between 1990 and 1991, Guldi was a post-doctoral researcher at the National Institute of Standard and Technology prior to working as a researcher at the Hahn-Meitner Institute in the years between 1992 and 1995. In 1995, he joined the University of Notre Dame, initially holding the position of assistant professional specialist from 1995 to 1996, followed by an appointment as associate professional specialist from 1996 to 2004 at the Radiation Laboratory. Since 2004, he has held the position of a full professor at Friedrich-Alexander-University Erlangen-Nürnberg. Furthermore, since 2013, he has served as an adjunct professor at Xi'an University of Science and Technology and Huazhong University of Science and Technology. Additionally, he holds the role of a partner investigator at the Intelligent Polymer Research Institute at the University of Wollongong.

Guldi served as the editor-in-chief for the journal Fullerenes, Nanotubes, and Carbon Nanostructures from 2001 to 2013. Concurrently, he held the position of vice-chairman for the fullerenes, nanotubes, and carbon nanostructures division at the Electrochemical Society from 2004 to 2008, later becoming its chairman from 2008 to 2012. He was elected as a member of the EU Academy of Sciences and European Academy of Science in both 2016 and 2020. Since 2020, he has served as the chairman of the Physical Chemistry Review Board at the German Science Foundation.

== Research ==
Guldi's research has focused on molecular systems. His 2000 study explored achievements in the excited-state properties of fullerene derivatives, emphasizing the photosensitizing and electron-acceptor features of functionalized fullerene materials. It also discussed the impact of functionalization on fullerene characteristics and presented the unique optimization of redox potentials, water-solubility, and singlet oxygen generation for novel fullerene-based materials. While addressing mechanical failures in hybrid polymers and single-wall carbon nanotube materials, his 2002 work proposed employing a layer-by-layer assembly protocol, achieving a nanometer-scale uniform composite with high single walled carbon nanotubes loading and exceptional strength for potential use in long-lifetime devices. In the same year, he collaborated with M. Prato and others to outline a method using 1,3-dipolar cycloaddition to functionalize carbon nanotubes, yielding soluble bundles with one organic group per 100 carbon atoms, showcasing potential applications in materials science. Moreover, in his exploration of the use of fullerenes, particularly C60, and porphyrins in creating integrated solar energy systems, his work emphasized the impact of C60 as a 3D electron acceptor and discussed how specific porphyrin-C60 compositions affect charge-separation states' rate, yield, and lifetime.

In 2014, Guldi examined electron transfer in donor–bridge–acceptor molecules, revealing an 840-fold increase in rate with carbon-bridged oligo-p-phenylenevinylene (COPV) due to enhanced electronic coupling and unprecedented inelastic electron tunneling effects at room temperature. In his investigation of singlet fission, a process in which one photon excites two electrons, his joint study with R. Tykwinski and others explored pentacene dimers in an organic solution to increase the triplet yield, which is usually 16% for pentacene to 156%. His 2019 study described the development of a synthetic system, [PBI]5Ru4POM, which mimicked aspects of natural photosynthesis. More recently in 2022, he explored the use of two-dimensional covalent triazine-based frameworks with a red edge effect for chromoselective photocatalysis, demonstrating selective C‒N cross-coupling reactions while suppressing undesirable dehalogenation processes in dual Ni-photocatalysis.

== Awards and honors ==
- 2003 – JSPS Award, The Japan Society for the Promotion of Science
- 2004 – JPP Award, Society of Porphyrins and Phthalocyanines
- 2013 – Fellow, Royal Society of Chemistry
- 2014 – Fellow, The Electrochemical Society
- 2015 – Richard E. Smalley Research Award, The Electrochemical Society
- 2018 – Ziegler-Natta Award, Italian Chemical Society
- 2022 – Lifetime Achievement Award, Society of Porphyrins and Phthalocyanines

== Bibliography ==
=== Books ===
- Chemistry and Physics of Fullerenes and Carbon Nanomaterials (2000) ISBN 9781566772778
- The Exciting World of Nanocages and Nanotubes (2002) ISBN 9781566773331
- Carbon Nanotubes and Related Structures Synthesis, Characterization, Functionalization, and Applications (2010) ISBN 9783527629947

=== Selected articles ===
- Guldi, D. M., & Prato, M. (2000). Excited-state properties of C60 fullerene derivatives. Accounts of Chemical Research, 33(10), 695–703.
- Georgakilas, V., Kordatos, K., Prato, M., Guldi, D. M., Holzinger, M., & Hirsch, A. (2002). Organic functionalization of carbon nanotubes. Journal of the American chemical society, 124(5), 760–761.
- Guldi, D. M. (2002). Fullerene–porphyrin architectures; photosynthetic antenna and reaction center models. Chemical Society Reviews, 31(1), 22–36.
- Georgakilas, V., Gournis, D., Tzitzios, V., Pasquato, L., Guldi, D. M., & Prato, M. (2007). Decorating carbon nanotubes with metal or semiconductor nanoparticles. Journal of Materials Chemistry, 17(26), 2679–2694.
- Bottari, G., de la Torre, G., Guldi, D. M., & Torres, T. (2010). Covalent and noncovalent phthalocyanine− carbon nanostructure systems: synthesis, photoinduced electron transfer, and application to molecular photovoltaics. Chemical reviews, 110(11), 6768–6816.
