= Sasa Hanten =

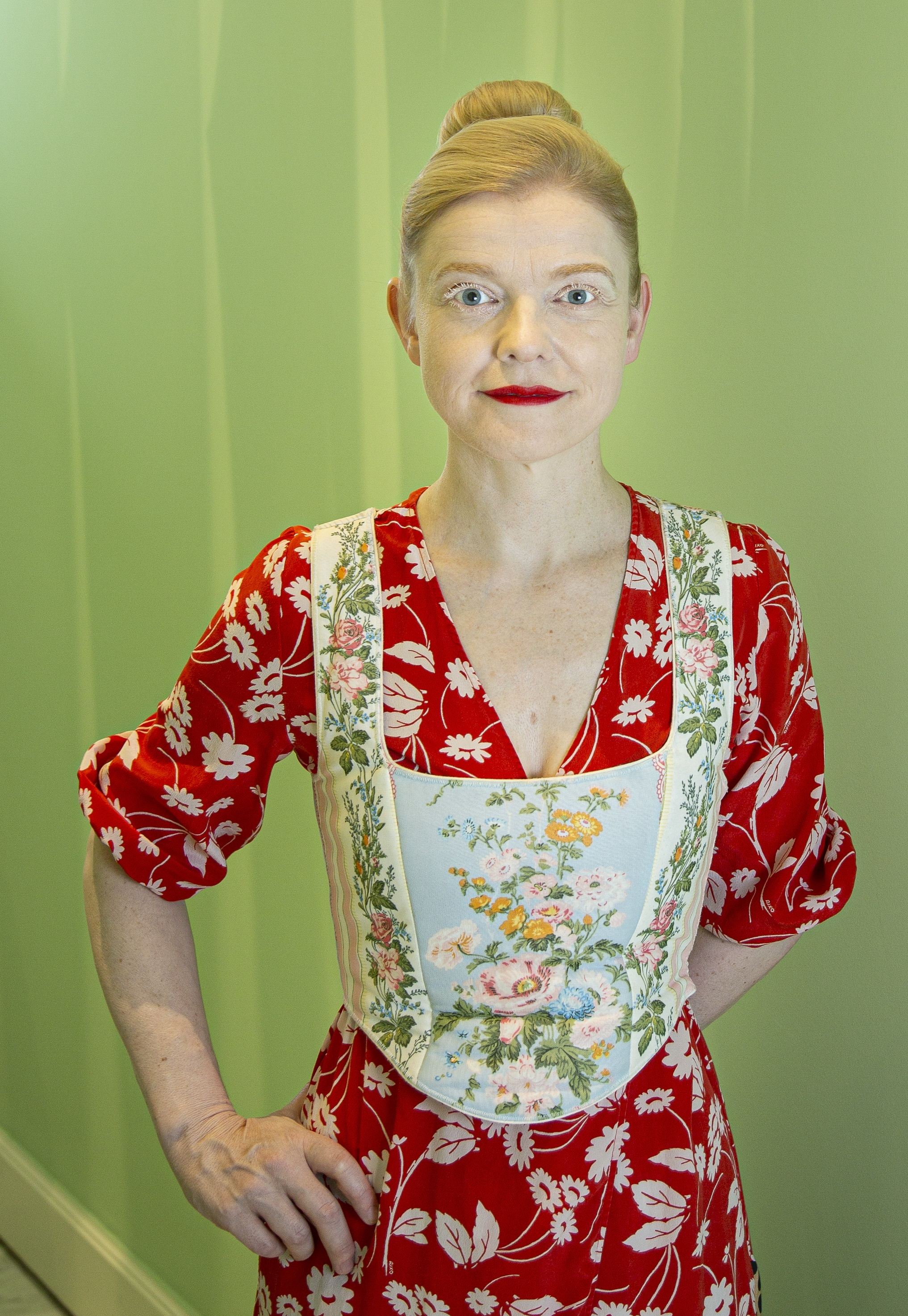
- Born: Sasa Hanten-Schmidt
- Education: Political Science, International Law; Law Sciences
- Alma mater: University of Cologne
- Occupations: Lawyer, publicist and court expert
- Board member of: Hanten-Schmidt-Foundation
- Website: https://sasahantenschmidt.com/

Sasa Hanten-Schmidt is a German lawyer, publicist and court expert on contemporary visual art. She is head of Angela Glajcar's studio and is responsible for her catalog raisonné. She runs the law firm Hanten-Schmidt

== Education ==
Hanten-Schmidt studied political science, international law and philosophy at the Christian Albrechts University in Kiel in 1991 and studied law at the University of Cologne from 1992 to 1995. After that, she further studied law at Heinrich Heine University Düsseldorf and the Fernuniversität Hagen till 1999.

== Career ==
Since 2003, Hanten-Schmidt has been practicing law at her own law firm in Cologne. She has been a Curator of a large private collection fine art in Cologne between 2004 and 2014. During this period, she published Martin Willing's catalog raisonné in 2010 ("Eigenwert Eigenvalue", Darling-Publications, Cologne). Since 2011, she has been head of studio of sculptor Angela Glajcar, and is the editor and publisher of her catalogue raisonné, and since 2012, she has been publicly appointed and sworn expert for contemporary fine arts with a focus on Europe. Since 2021, she has been a member of the examination board for experts in the field of art and antiques in Germany.

== Works ==
Hanten-Schmidt has written and contributed to books and essays, and has given many lectures on the best practices on the generational transition related to art. She also has written monographic publications and essays on contemporary artists Nan Hoover/Bill Viola, Bettina Blohm, Martin Willing, Angela Glajcar, Hans Hartung, Eduard Micus, Emil Schumacher and topics in contemporary day art (photographic positions, spatial experience, painting).

Hanten-Schmidt also writes about what to consider when inheriting art.

Hanten-Schmidt authored the book Look At Me! Key Moments in the History of a Collection/Checkpoints of an Art Collection in which she derived the emergence and generational transition in a contemporary entrepreneurial collection. She also contributed to the book The Human Factor: How Does Art Make the Generational Transition Succeed?, in which the central subject of the symposium was the generational transition with reference to art.

== Publications ==
- Look At Me!: Checkpoints of An Art Collection (2017) ISBN 978-3959051613
