= Philippa Lindenthal =

German fashion designer and professor in New York City

Philippa Lindenthal (born March 1, 1976 in Frankfurt am Main) is a German fashion designer. and professor in New York City.

== Early life and education ==
Lindenthal grew up in Frankfurt am Main, Schwanheim and received her high school diploma in 1995 from the Schillerschule in Frankfurt-Sachsenhausen. Between high school and university, she completed a two and a half year tailoring apprenticeship with Salon Elise Topell, an haute couture design studio in Wiesbaden. While at the University of Applied Sciences in Hamburg, she was invited to Tokyo as a finalist in the Onward Kashiyama Fashion Grand Prix. She graduated in 2003 with a diploma (equivalent to a BFA degree) in fashion design.

With honors and a grant from the Karl-Heinz Ditze Foundation and two full-time scholarships from the Carl Duisberg Society (now inWent Society) and the German Academic Exchange Service, she studied in London at the renowned Royal College of Art and in 2005 received a Master of Fine Arts in Fashion Womenswear. The same year, she was a finalist for a design competition by United Arrows.

== Career ==
Established in 2005, her fashion design label philippa lindenthal has included womenswear, knitwear and menswear. Her collections have been shown at Berlin Fashion Week, Düsseldorf Fashion Week, and Paris Fashion Week. She represented Hamburg in the European Capital of Culture, Marseille fashion show.

She has extensive experience as a designer for DKNY, Jil Sander, Moschino and Rene Lezard. She has also taught internationally at various institutions, including for FIT at Zhejiang Sci-Tech University Hangzhou, and at ESMOD Berlin, aid Berlin, Akademie Mode Design Hamburg, JAK Hamburg and HAW Hamburg. Since 2015 she has been a professor of fashion design at the Fashion Institute of Technology in New York City

== Publications ==
Lindenthal, Philippa (2025). "Forming Futures: Exploring the Intersection of Creativity, Pedagogy, and Technology in Fashion Design". Proceedings of the 27th Annual IFFTI Conference. International Foundation of Fashion Technology Institutes: 253-263. ISSN 2583-875X.

== Trivia ==
Another Lindenthal who came from the region of her ancestors was Gustav Lindenthal, who designed the Hell Gate Bridge in New York City.
