= Joybrato Mukherjee =

German university teacher

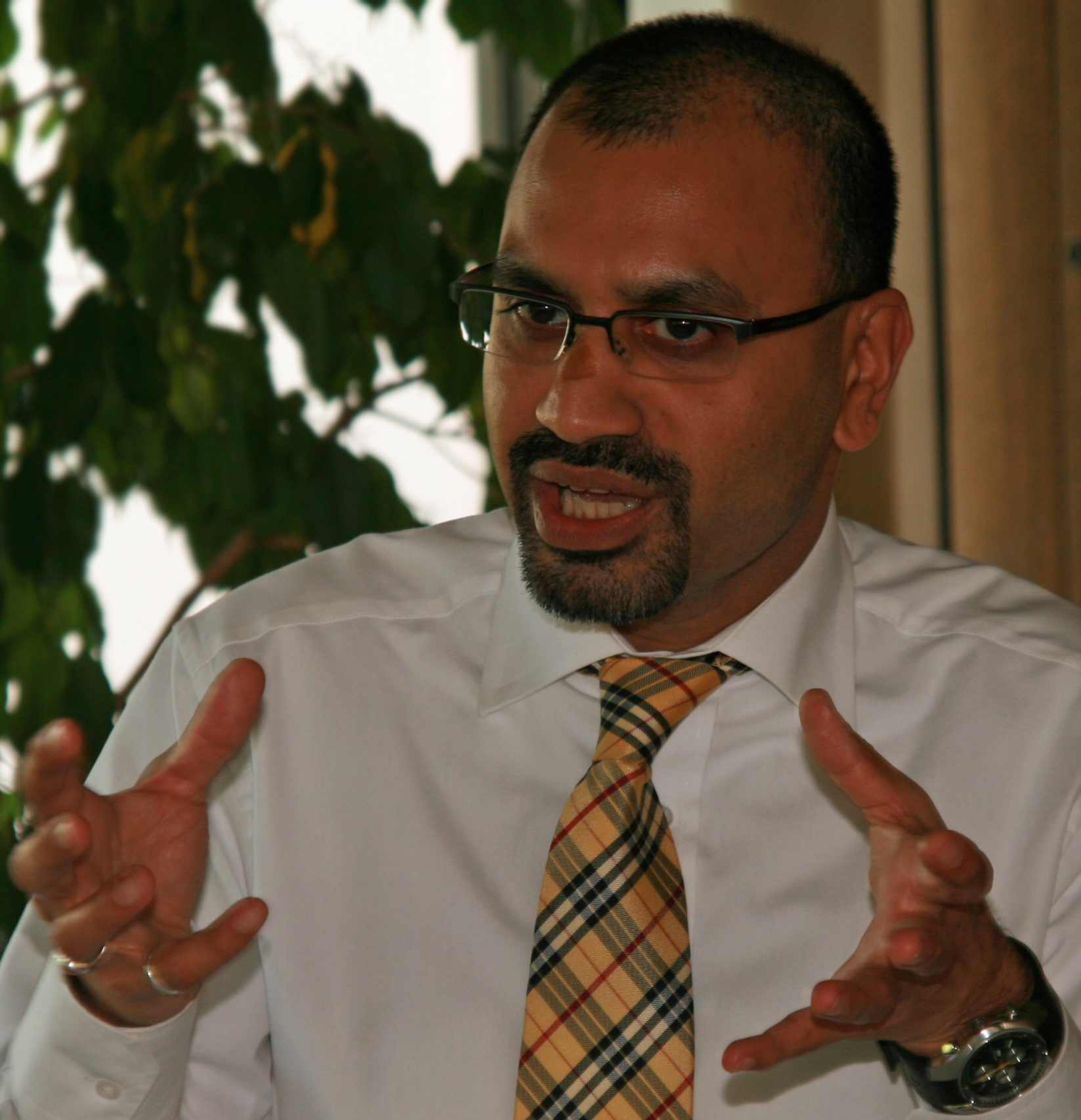
Joybrato Mukherjee

Joybrato Mukherjee (born 29 September 1973) is a German professor of English linguistics and the president of the University of Cologne. When he took office as president of the University of Giessen in 2009, he was the youngest university president ever appointed in Germany. In June 2019, he was elected president of the German Academic Exchange Service (DAAD); he took office on 1 January 2020.

== Education ==
Born in the Rhineland in Germany as the son of Bengali Indian immigrants, Mukherjee studied English language and literature, biology and pedagogy at the Technical University of Aachen, where he completed his master's degree and took the First State Examination (the teaching degree in Germany) in 1997. After a period as a trainee teacher and part-time teacher at the "Gymnasium am Wirteltor", Düren, he took the Second State Examination in 1999 and embarked on his doctoral studies at the University of Bonn with a major in English philology and minors in genetics and educational science. In 2000 he gained his PhD in English linguistics with a dissertation on the interaction between intonation and syntax. It was also at Bonn that he completed his habilitation, for which he wrote a post-doctoral thesis on English ditransitive verbs, and that he received the venia legendi in 2003, the German authorisation to teach at a university, in the field of English philology.

== Academic career ==
In 2003, Mukherjee was appointed to the chair of English linguistics at the University of Giessen. His research interests include applied corpus linguistics, English syntax and varieties of English. At the University of Giessen, he was a principal investigator at the International Graduate Centre for the Study of Culture (GCSC), which was funded in both funding rounds under the Excellence Initiative of the German federal and state governments between 2006 and 2019. He was President of the Executive Board of the International Computer Archive of Modern and Medieval English (ICAME) from 2011 to 2017.

Mukherjee was vice-president of the German Academic Exchange Service (DAAD) from 2012 to 2019. On 1 January 2020, he took office as the DAAD’s current president, thus leading one of the world’s most important funding organisations for the international exchange of students and researchers. Between October 2016 and September 2018, he was Speaker of the Conference of Hessian University Presidents. He is also a member of various advisory boards and boards of trustees.

Although he received several calls to other universities, including the universities of Zurich (Switzerland) and Salzburg (Austria), Mukherjee chose to stay at the University of Giessen. The University of Agricultural Sciences and Veterinary Medicine of Iași (Romania) awarded him an honorary doctorate (Dr. h.c.) in 2012 for his academic achievements and his contribution to strengthening the excellent ties between the two universities. In March 2018, he was awarded an honorary doctorate by the Tbilisi State University (TSU) in Georgia.

== Politics, university governance and policy ==
Mukherjee is a member of the SPD (Social Democratic Party of Germany) and was nominated by the Hessian SPD to participate in the 14th Federal Convention, which elected the German Federal President on 30 June 2010.

Between 2004 and 2008 Mukherjee was Vice Dean of the Faculty of Language, Literature and Culture; between 2005/2006 and 2008 he was also a member of the senate at the University of Giessen as well as the spokesperson for the "Neue Universität", a group of politically independent professors supporting the university's development. At the beginning of 2008, Mukherjee was elected first vice-president of the University of Giessen by a large majority. On 8 March 2009, the extended senate elected him president of the university in the first ballot, with 20 out of 34 votes. He took office on 16 December 2009, succeeding Stefan Hormuth. On 11 February 2015, the extended senate elected Mukherjee president for a second term until 2021. Again, he won the election in the first ballot, securing 27 out of 34 votes.

The Executive Board of JLU under Mukherjee's leadership since 2009 has pursued the goal of increasing the basic funding of Hessian universities. Mukherjee is particularly committed to promoting cooperation involving the different stakeholders in the academic community in the form of regional consortia recommended by the German Council of Science and Humanities.

Particularly in the light of the privatisation of the university teaching hospital, University Hospital of Giessen and Marburg, Mukherjee and the Executive Board of JLU are committed to securing and guaranteeing teaching and research in university medicine and at the same time taking an objective, discerning view of privatisation. In cooperation with the Hanns Martin Schleyer Foundation, the JLU organised the XIII University Symposium (Hochschulsymposium) at the State Representation Office of the State of Hesse in Berlin on 20 and 21 February 2019. Attendees of the symposium critically engaged with various challenges today's university medicine has to face. Amongst other topics, they dealt with the requirements of an increasing digitalisation and with questions concerning the international competitiveness of Germany as a medical location.

Mukherjee is pursuing a clear institutional internationalisation strategy with the Executive Board of JLU. Under his leadership, JLU was one of the first pilot universities to participate in the Internationalisation Audit in 2010 run by the German Rectors' Conference and was the first university in Germany to be successful in the re-audit. This led JLU to launch its new Internationalisation Strategy in 2016 entitled "Progress through Internationalisation – JLU International 2016-2020".

Mukherjee sees gender equality as crucial to the university's identity. In 2009, JLU implemented the instrument of the research-oriented gender equality standards set by the German Research Foundation (DFG), upon which DFG rated JLU as belonging to the top group. Mukherjee was a member of the DFG gender equality working party until 2019.

In June 2019, he was elected President of the German Academic Exchange Service (DAAD). He took office on 1 January 2020. According to Mukherjee, "providing support, advice and analysis" is the brand essence of the DAAD which he also sets as the priorities of his work. In addition to promoting academic exchange, he sees the core tasks of the DAAD as providing advice to the higher education sector and serving as a think tank for internationalisation.

On May 10, 2023, the University of Cologne’s electoral assembly elected him as its new rector.

In April 2024, Mukherjee withdrew the Albertus Magnus Professorship 2024 of Jewish-American political theorist Nancy Fraser. The Albertus Magnus Professorship is an award bestowed by the University of Cologne. Mukherjee justified the withdrawal by stating that Fraser had signed a pro-Palestinian letter during the Gaza war that called for a boycott of Israeli educational institutions and universities. The cancellation of the professorship was controversially discussed. Jonas Staal rejected his nomination for a DAAD fellowship because of what he said was "Mukherjee's complicity in anti-Palestine censorship in Germany". Staal cited Mukherjee's treatment of Fraser in his letter declining the fellowship. China Miéville rejected his nomination for a DAAD fellowship on the 23 of April, also citing Mukherjee's role in cancelling Nancy Fraser and lack in "faith that the institution will stand against such a shameful program of repression and anti-Palestinian racism."

As part of the second round of calls for proposals under the federal and state governments’ Strategy for Excellence, he was able to regain the title of “University of Excellence” in 2026 with the University of Cologne.

== Other activities ==
- Alexander von Humboldt Foundation, Member of the Board of Trustees
- German National Academic Foundation, Member of the Board of Trustees
- Max Planck Institute for Psycholinguistics, Member of the Board of Trustees
- Vietnamese-German University (VGU), Member of the University Council
- Von-Behring Röntgen Foundation, Member of the Board of Trustees

== Publications (selection) ==
- Mukherjee, Joybrato (2001). Form and Function of Parasyntactic Presentation Structures. Leiden Boston: Rodopi. ISBN 978-90-420-1295-0.
- —— (2005). English Ditransitive Verbs. Boston: Rodopi. ISBN 978-90-420-1934-8.
- —— (2005). Short Stories from India. Berlin: Cornelsen. ISBN 978-3-464-35991-4.
- Exploring Second-Language Varieties of English and Learner Englishes: Bridging a paradigm gap. Vol. 44. Amsterdam: John Benjamins Publishing Company. 25 May 2011. doi:10.1075/scl.44. ISBN 978-90-272-2320-3.
- ——; Huber, Magnus (2012). Corpus Linguistics and Variation in English. Amsterdam: Brill Rodopi. ISBN 978-90-420-3495-2.
- Learner Corpora and Language Teaching. Vol. 92. Amsterdam: John Benjamins Publishing Company. 6 May 2019. doi:10.1075/scl.92. ISBN 978-90-272-0236-9.
