= Stephan Noller =

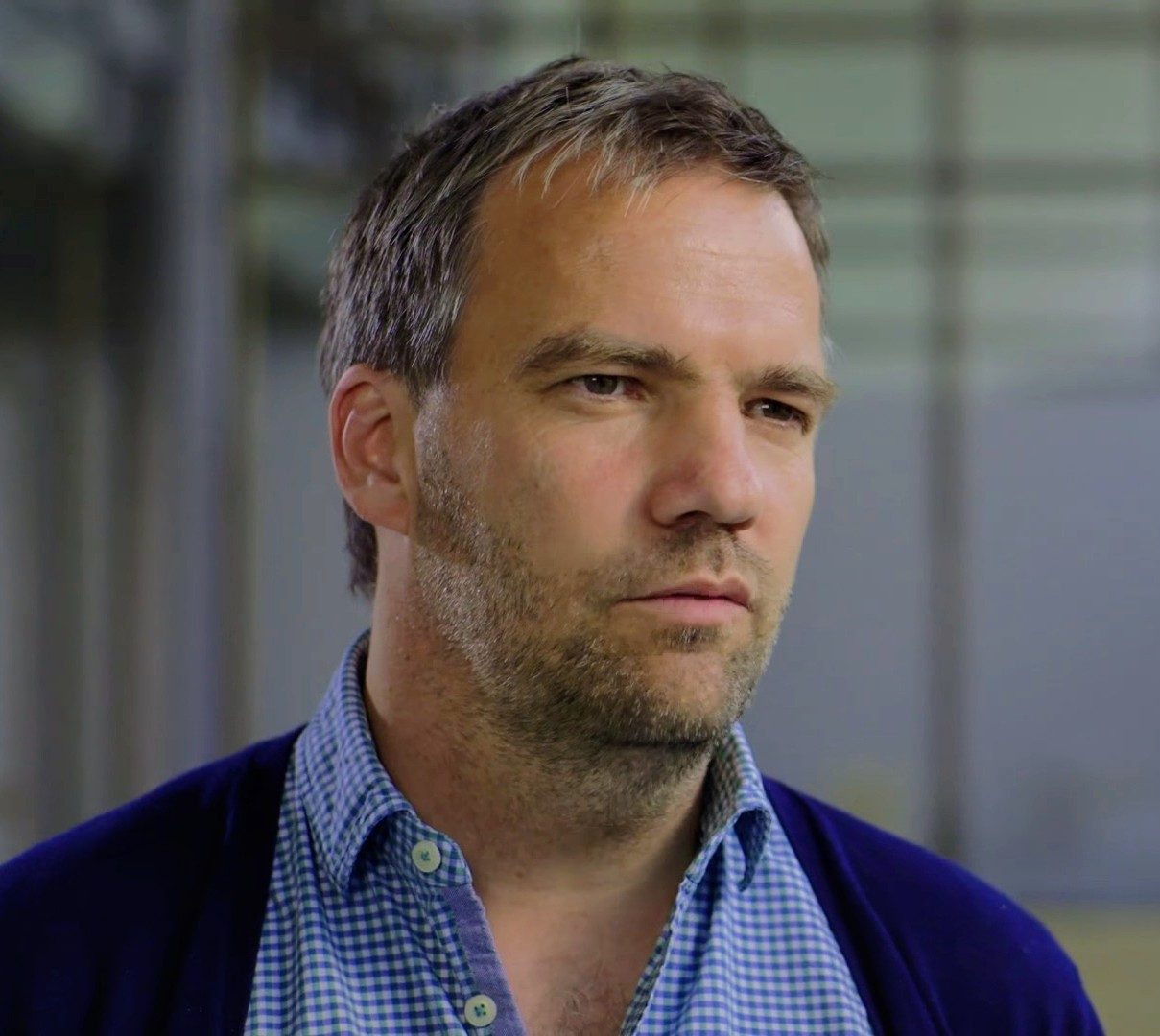
Stephan Noller, 2016

Stephan Noller (born January 6, 1970) is a German internet-entrepreneur, founder and CEO of the nugg.ad predictive behavioral targeting company, and former chairman of the IAB Europe Policy Committee.

== Career ==
Stephan Noller studied psychology at the University of Cologne, earning honors with distinction for his thesis "Mental Models and Web Navigation". In professional publications and research studies Noller concentrated on theories as to what conclusions could be drawn from users' online behavior. His roots come from Fraunhofer Society, where he worked on machine learning algorithms to predict user's interests and demographics out of behavioral data. After developing a new process for measuring internet coverage for the industry association AGOF while working at TNS Emnid, he created an online advertising targeting system based on automated profiling for TNS Infratest in 2006: Predictive Behavioral Targeting by nugg.ad. Besides continually developing this system, he was also active for United Internet Media, and published portals such as web.de (named TGP) and gmx.de.

The Predictive Behavioral Targeting system became the first targeting system to be granted the data privacy seal of The Independent Centre for Privacy Protection (ULD) in Schleswig-Holstein, Germany, and was also granted the EuroPriSe seal (funded by the European Commission under its eTEN programme) in 2009 for using a preceding anonymization process that filtered IP addresses reliably, compliant with the central data austerity criterion of data protection. The German government awarded Noller and Richard Hutton a patent for the system in February 2015. The company nugg.ad was sold to Deutsche Post DHL in 2010.

In 2009, Noller was elected chairman of the IAB Europe Policy Committee, where he represented the interests of the European internet industry to political committees at the continent level, influenced market developments, and responded to challenges to data privacy caused by data-driven internet business models. On 14 April 2011, the committee headed a broad coalition of associations, companies, and tech providers of the European online industry in presenting a self-regulation model to the public; it addressed the loophole regarding the realization of the ePrivacy directive towards the European Commission and sought to bring more transparency and control to consumers regarding online behavioral advertising.

In appreciation of his activities and work, Noller was awarded the "Best Personality" award at the 2012 Marketing and Interactive Excellence Awards Europe. Since 2012 he is a columnist for the leading data driven-advertising blog ExchangeWire. From 2013 to 2019 he was appointed to the Council of Advisors on Digital Economy to the Federal Ministry of Economics and Energy, the "Beirat Junge Digitale Wirtschaft", and to the Rheinland Palatine's state Council for Digital Development and Culture.

In 2014 Noller Co-founded the company Ubirch GmbH that offers a system for device security based on cryptography and blockchain technology. The company implemented ways of securing medical data records and making the verifiable for third parties in a privacy friendly way. The technology was used during the COVID-19 pandemic to secure COVID test-results and vaccination status records. In a consortium with IBM, govdigital and Bechtle Ubirch is running the system behind the German national digital COVID vaccination pass system.
