= German Academic Exchange Service =

German funding and support organization

- Deutscher Akademischer Austauschdienst
- Abbreviation: DAAD
- Formation: 1925
- Type: Eingetragener Verein (registered association)
- Headquarters: Bonn, Germany
- President: Joybrato Mukherjee
- Staff: approx. 1220 (Bonn, Berlin and worldwide)
- Website: www.daad.de

The German Academic Exchange Service (DAAD; German: Deutscher Akademischer Austauschdienst), is a joint organization of German universities and student bodies that was founded in 1925 to foster their international relations.

== History ==
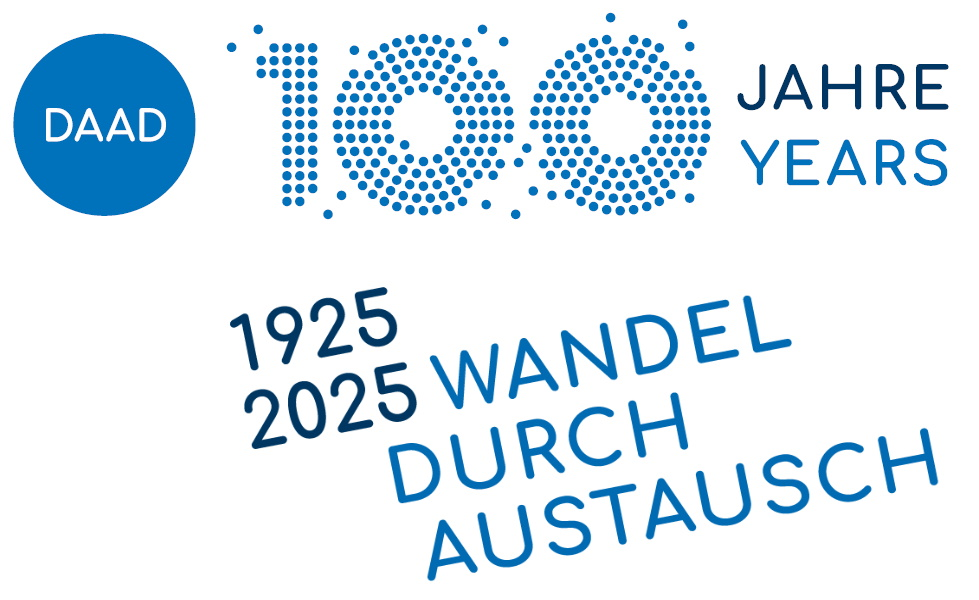
100th anniversary logo

The organisation was founded as "Akademischer Austauschdienst" e. V. (AAD) on 13 January 1925 in Heidelberg, based on a student initiative. The headquarters were moved to Berlin later that year. It was renamed Deutscher Akademischer Austauschdienst (DAAD; English:German Academic Exchange Service) in 1931. After the National Socialists came to power in 1933, DAAD sought to secure future funding by realigning its purpose with Nazi ideology. Ewald von Massow, a member of the NSDAP, was appointed president. The office in the Berlin City Palace was destroyed by bombing in 1943 and the service was then dissolved in 1945.

On 5 August 1950, the DAAD was re-established in Bonn. Until the beginning of 2015, the association used the variants "Austausch-Dienst" and "Austausch Dienst" in its publications to clarify the acronym DAAD.

In 2021, DAAD's activities in Belarus were suspended at the request of the Belarusian authorities. In 2026, DAAD was designated as an "undesirable organisation" in Russia.

Joybrato Mukherjee, who has been DAAD president since 1 January 2020, was re-elected for the second term running from 1 January 2024 to 31 December 2027.

In 2025, DAAD celebrated its 100th anniversary.

== Tasks and goals ==
DAAD's purpose is to promote the international exchange of students and academics. As of 2025 it is the world's largest funding organisation for the international exchange of students and academics. having supported 132,903 people worldwide in 2025 and 140, 925 (including EU programmes)

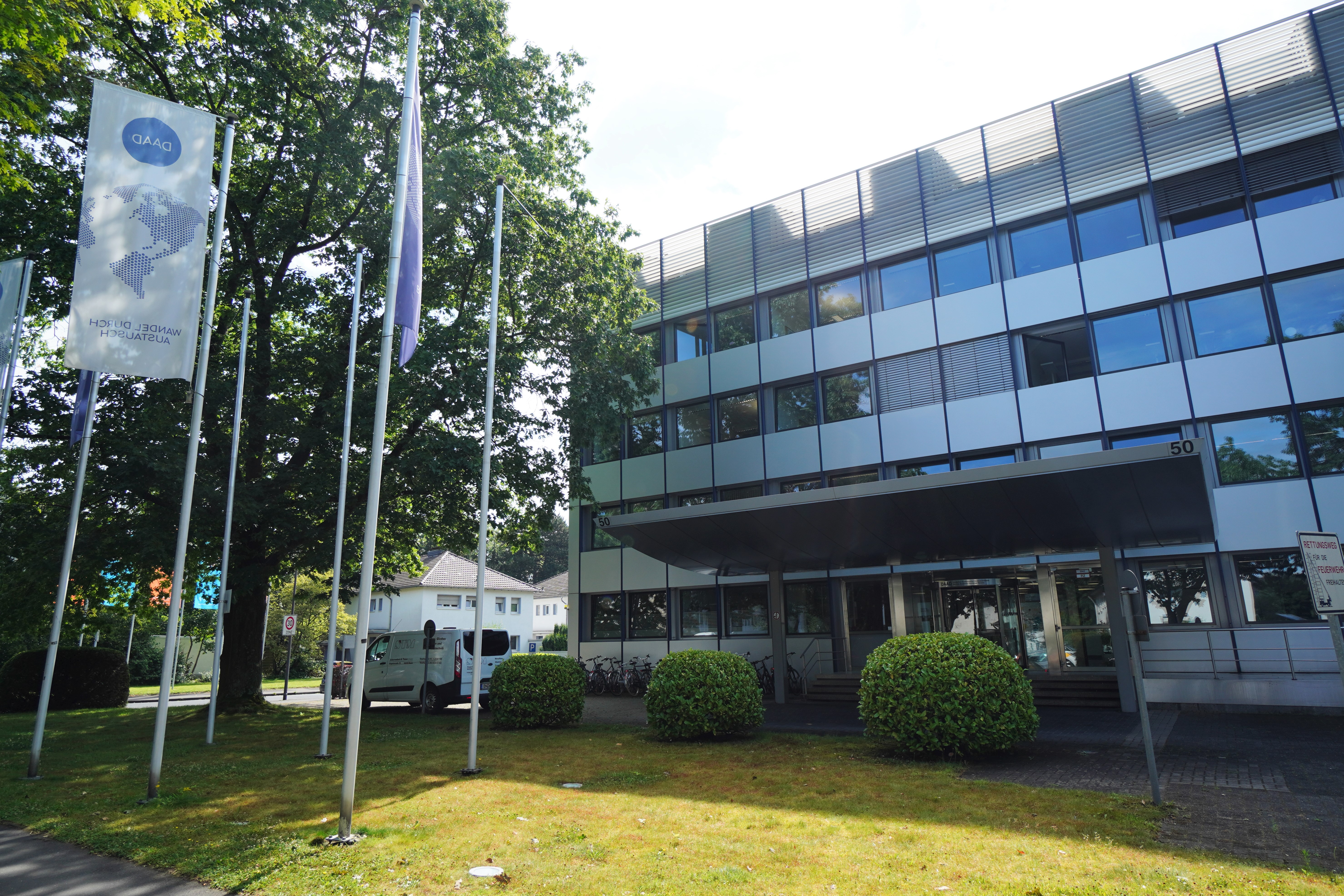
Main building in Bonn

However, its activities go far beyond awarding scholarships. The organisation also promotes the internationalisation of German universities and research, offers strategic advice to universities in the field of internationalisation and marketing, strengthens German studies, the German language abroad, supports countries of the Global South in establishing efficient universities, and advises decision-makers on cultural, education and development policy.

In 2024, the DAAD, including the EU programmes, supported more than 140,000 people around the globe, making it the largest funding organisation of its kind in the world. Its services range from semesters abroad for bachelor's and master's students to doctoral studies, from internships to guest lectureships, from information visits to the establishment of universities abroad. The DAAD supports the international activities of German universities through marketing services, publications, events and training courses, but also through special funding programmes for the establishment of international university partnerships. Scholarships for foreigners are advertised via the DAAD scholarship database and publicised via German embassies, DAAD regional offices, information centres (ICs), DAAD lecturers, and partner universities abroad. Contact with the DAAD for German students is usually arranged by the International Office of a university. One exception is the DAAD Artists-in-Berlin Programme, which is aimed at visual artists, writers, and musicians.

DAAD is also the national agency for the coordination and implementation of the European Union's Erasmus+ programme for the higher education sector.

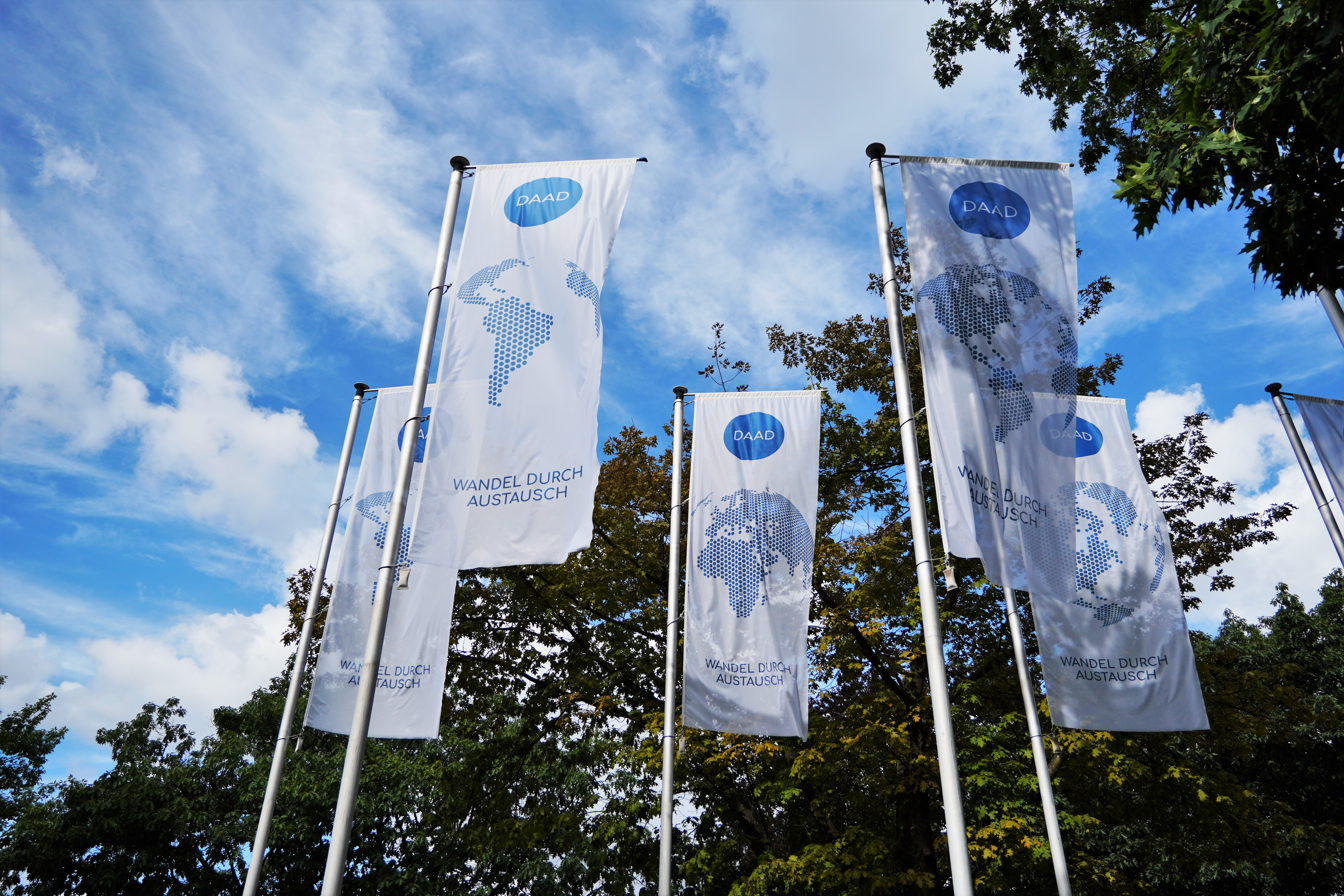
DAAD flags on Kennedyallee, Bonn

The organisation's statutory name is Deutscher Akademischer Austauschdienst e.V. (German Academic Exchange Service). Until the beginning of 2015, it is also used the variants "Austausch-Dienst" and "Austausch Dienst" in its publication to clarify the acronym DAAD.

=== DAAD Strategy 2030 ===
In view of the global challenges facing international academic cooperation and the growing importance of international academic exchange, the DAAD published a new strategy in January 2025. This DAAD Strategy 2030 serves as a compass for the organisation. It analyses the current framework conditions of international academic cooperation and, on this basis, formulates the priorities and goals of the DAAD's work until 2030. The strategy emphasises the role of the DAAD as an actor in foreign science policy and science diplomacy and systematically takes account of current developments at universities and in society.

Against this background, the DAAD Strategy 2030 sets four priorities:

1. strengthening Germany as a location for science, innovation and business
2. solutions for global challenges
3. science diplomacy in a multipolar world
4. promoting democracy and social cohesion

These priorities are formulated in ten strategic goals in DAAD's three central fields of action - funding, networking, advising - and the three strategic cross-cutting dimensions - sustainability, diversity, and digitisation.

== Mission statement ==
"Change by exchange" is the DAAD's motto. Through international academic exchange (mission), the DAAD promotes the personal development and qualification of people and shapes social and global transformation processes for a better future on the planet (vision).

== Notable alumni ==
Some Nobel Prize winners are DAAD alumni, including:

- Günter Blobel (physiology, 1999),
- Gao Xingjian (literature, 2000),
- Wolfgang Ketterle (physics, 2001),
- Imre Kertész (literature, 2002),
- Wangari Maathai (Nobel Peace Prize, 2004),
- Herta Müller (literature, 2009),
- Mario Vargas Llosa (literature, 2009),
- Svetlana Alexievich (literature, 2015),
- Leo Hoffmann-Axthelm (Nobel Peace Prize, 2017),
- Olga Tokarczuk (literature, 2018),
- Peter Handke (literature, 2019), and others.

Other Alumni:

- Margaret Atwood (*1939), writer
- Unsuk Chin (*1961), composer
- Willie Doherty (*1959), artist
- Jeffrey Eugenides (* 1960), writer
- Jim Jarmusch (* 1953), film producer
- Philippa Lindenthal (* 1976), fashion designer
- Ryszard Kapuściński (1932-2007), journalist
- Nam June Paik (1932-2006), artist
- Max Söllner (1929-2003), artist
- Susan Sontag (1933-2004), writer and director
- Bob Wilson (* 1941), director and playwright
- Ghil'ad Zuckermann (* 1971), linguist
- Emmett Williams (1925-2007), Fluxus artist
- Claus Kleber (* 1955), journalist
- Karl Lauterbach (* 1963), German physician, health economist and politician (SPD)
- Norbert Langer (* 1958), astrophysicist
- Sascha Spoun (* 1969), German-Swiss economist. President of Leuphana University of Lüneburg since 2006
- Juli Zeh (* 1974), writer and lawyer
- Jutta Allmendinger (* 1956), sociologist
- Karamba Diaby (* 1961), politician (SPD) and member of the Bundestag
- Magdalena Götz (* 1962), neurobiologist and university lecturer
- Claudia Kemfert (* 1968), economist, Head of the Energy, Transport and Environment Department at the German Institute for Economic Research (DIW), Professor at Leuphana University Lüneburg,
- Juliane Kokott (* 1957), lawyer, Advocate General at the Court of Justice of the European Union (CJEU) and titular professor at the University of St. Gallen
- Dagmar Schäfer (* 1968), sinologist and historian of science
- Andreas Meck (1959-2019), German architect and university lecturer
- Juliane Vogel (* 1959), literary scholar, Professor of Modern German Literature and General Literary Studies at the University of Konstanz
- Wolfgang Ketterle (* 1957), German physicist, university lecturer and Nobel Prize winner
- Harald zur Hausen (1936-2023), physician and Nobel Prize winner
- Tsitsi Dangarembga (* 1959), author and filmmaker
- Alexander Gerst (* 1976), geophysicist and astronaut
- Susanne Mahlmeister (1952-2000), painter, photographer and sculptor

== Funding ==
The DAAD's budget comes mainly from public funds (Federal Foreign Office, BMBF, BMZ, EU, etc.), but also from private donors and organisations.

The total budget (total funds) in 2024 amounted to €752.82 million.

== Organisation ==
DAAD employs around approx. 1220 people worldwide

=== Bodies ===
The President (see adjacent) represents the DAAD externally.

In addition to the President and Vice-President, the DAAD Board currently consists of ten representatives (m/f) of the universities (Presidents, Rectors or Heads of the International Offices) and three student representatives. The Board members are elected by the General Assembly, whereby the student representatives must have the majority of all votes and those of the student bodies. The representatives of the universities are elected every four years, those of the student bodies every two years. The following are also co-opted as guests

· Representatives of the financing federal ministries (AA, BMBF and BMZ),

· the presidents of the German Rectors' Conference (HRK), the Goethe-Institut and the Alexander von Humboldt Foundation (AvH)

· the General Secretaries of the Standing Conference of the Ministers of Education and Cultural Affairs of the Länder in the Federal Republic of Germany (KMK) and the “Stifterverband für die deutsche Wissenschaft”, more specifically their representatives.

The General Assembly meets once a year.

=== Presidents ===
Name	Term of Office	
Name	from	to
Alfred Weber	1925	1925
Viktor Bruns	1925	1931
Theodor Lewald	1931	1933
Ewald von Massow	1933	1942
Gustav Adolf Scheel	1942	1945
Theodor Klauser	1950	1954
Werner Richter	1954	1959
Emil Lehnartz	1960	1968
Gerhard Kielwein	1968	1972
Hansgerd Schulte	1972	1987
Theodor Berchem	1988	2007
Stefan Hormuth	2008	2010
Sabine Kunst	2010	2011
Margret Wintermantel	2012	2019
Joybrato Mukherjee	2020	as of 2025

=== Head office ===
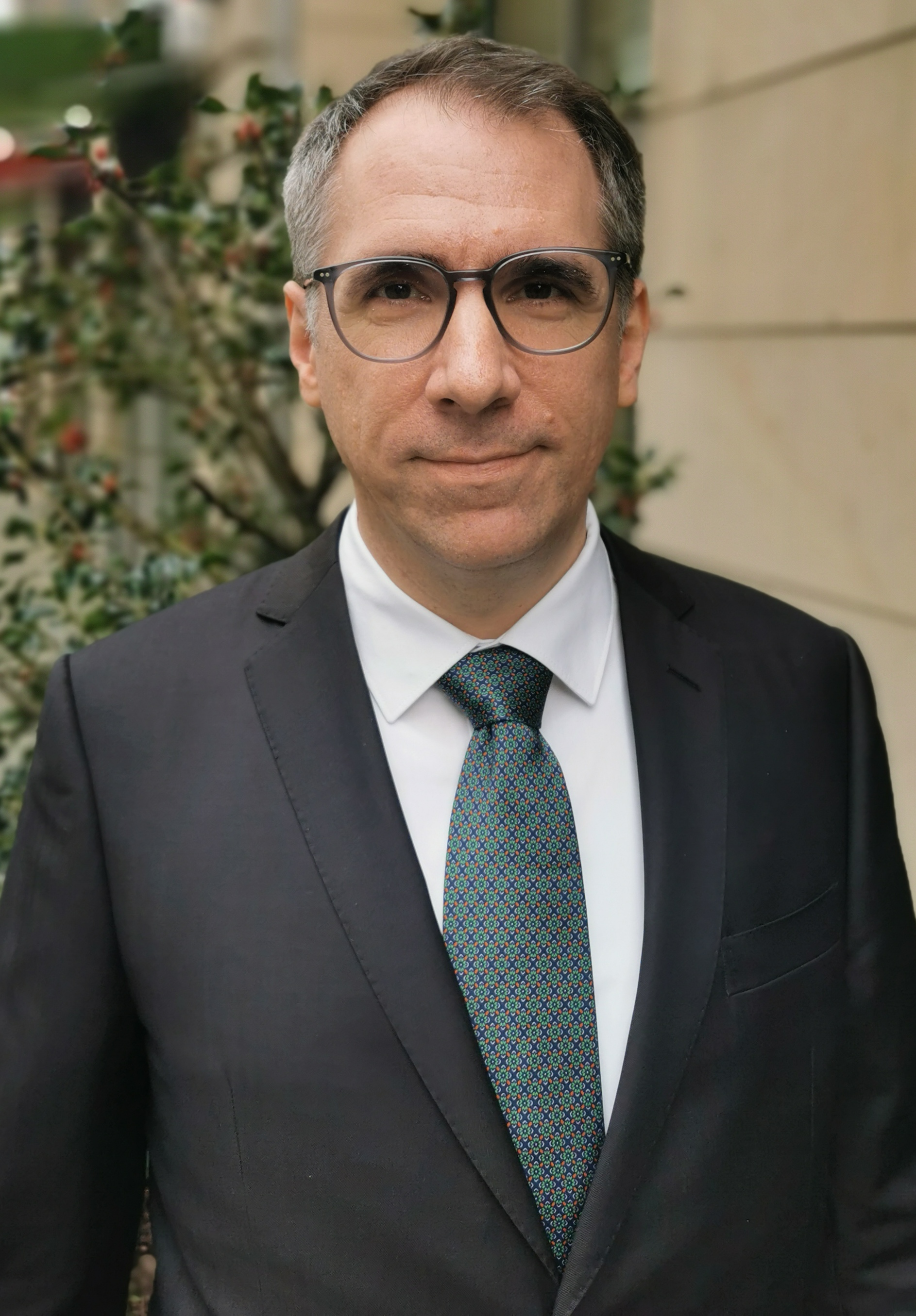
Kai Sicks (2024)

The DAAD Head Office is headed by Secretary General Kai Sicks. In 2019, the budget volume amounted to 594 million euros, the number of permanent positions as well as project and third-party funded positions was 929. In 2021, the DAAD funded around 64,000 students, graduates, scientists, artists and administrators: 14,427 came to Germany from abroad, 49,825 Germans gained experience all over the world. The “National Agency for EU Higher Education Cooperation” within the DAAD is responsible for implementing Erasmus+ activities in the higher education sector, coordinating not only study abroad programmes but also internships and exchanges of lecturers and other university administration staff. As part of the Erasmus+ mobility programmes, 40.063 people were funded in 2024.

In addition to its headquarters in Bonn (Kennedyallee 50), the DAAD maintains a capital city office in Berlin, which is located in the WissenschaftsForum Berlin. The renowned DAAD Artists-in-Berlin Programme is also affiliated with the capital city office.

=== Regional offices and information centres ===
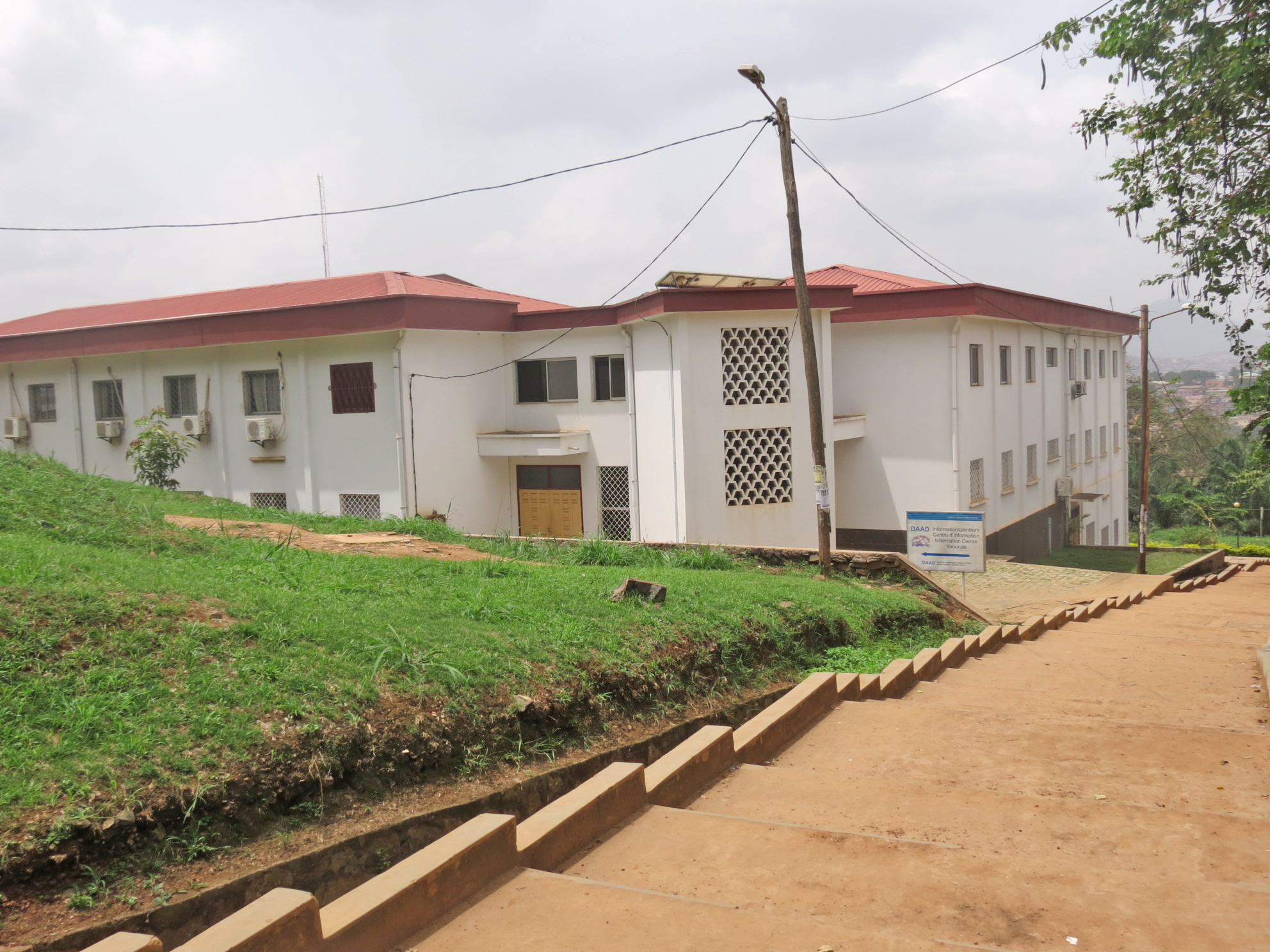
DAAD Information Center in Yaoundé, Cameroon

A network of 21 regional offices, 36 information centers (ICs) and 6 German Centres for Research and Innovation (DWIH) in more than 50 countries maintains contact with the partner countries and provides advice on site (as of 2024).

The first DAAD regional office was founded in London in 1927, the most recent in Accra in 2024 and in Bishkek in 2025.

The Regional Offices with their founding year:

- DAAD Regional Office London (founded in 1927; reopened in 1952)
- DAAD Regional Office Cairo (1960)
- DAAD Regional Office New Delhi (1960)
- DAAD Regional Office Paris (1963)
- DAAD Regional Office New York City (1971)
- DAAD Regional Office Rio de Janeiro (1972)
- DAAD Regional Office Moscow (1973, 1993)
- DAAD Regional Office Nairobi (1973)
- DAAD Regional Office Tokyo (1978)
- DAAD Regional Office Jakarta (1990)
- DAAD Regional Office Beijing (1994)
- DAAD Regional Office Warsaw (1997)
- DAAD Regional Office Mexico City (2001)
- DAAD Regional Office Hanoi (2003)
- DAAD Regional Office Brussels (2007)[31]
- DAAD Regional Office Tunis
- DAAD Regional Office Amman
- DAAD Regional Office Bogotá
- DAAD Regional Office Tunis (2020)
- DAAD Regional Office Tiflis (2021)
- DAAD Regional Office Accra (2024)
- DAAD Regional Office Central Asia, based in Bishkek (2025)

=== DAAD-Freundeskreis e. V. ===
Foreign students on DAAD scholarships are supported in Germany by former German DAAD scholarship holders who are members of the DAAD-Freundeskreis e. V.

The Circle of Friends was founded in 1981 and has around 1500 members nationwide. There are regional groups in many university cities which organize the support of foreign scholarship holders.

DAAD friends groups and alumni associations of former foreign scholarship holders exist in many countries.

== Other ==
According to a survey conducted in 2020, participants in the DAAD's Erasmus+ programmes (around 79,000 participants) enter into living relationships with foreign partners (27%) twice as often as students who have not spent time abroad (13%). Furthermore, the unemployment rate for Erasmus+ students five years after graduation is 23% lower than for those who have not been abroad for study or training purposes.

Since 2021, the DAAD has been supporting students who are formally or de facto denied the right to education or other basic rights in their home countries with the Hilde Domin programme.

== Prizes ==
Jacob and Wilhelm Grimm Prize

The DAAD awards an annual Jacob and Wilhelm Grimm Prize to academics from abroad for “outstanding work in the fields of German literature and linguistics, German as a foreign language and German studies”. The award, in memory of the linguists and founders of German studies Jacob and Wilhelm Grimm, is endowed with 10,000 euros and is associated with a four-week research stay at a German university. The Jacob and Wilhelm Grimm Prize honours new scholars in the same research fields.

AA Prize

Together with the Federal Foreign Office, the DAAD has awarded the Federal Foreign Office Prize for excellent support for foreign students at German universities (AA Prize), which has been awarded annually since 1998 (endowed with €20,000 since 2013).

University Integration Prize

The “University Integration Prize for outstanding commitment to the integration of refugees who are able to study”, or University Integration Prize for short, has been awarded by the DAAD and the Federal Ministry of Education and Research (BMBF) since 2021. The prize is intended to highlight particularly innovative and successful projects and initiatives, identify projects with a model character and encourage sustainable further development.

== See also ==
- Franco-German University
- Pädagogischer Austauschdienst, another German academic exchange service for school teachers and students
- List of Nobel laureates
- DAAD Alumni Association of the US
