= U15 (German universities) =

Association of fifteen major universities in Germany

German U15 e.V. is an association of fifteen major research-intensive and leading medical universities in Germany with a full disciplinary spectrum, excluding any defining engineering sciences.

The governing body is the University of Bonn, represented by Rector Michael Hoch; the deputy governing body are the Leipzig University, represented by Rector Eva Inés Obergfell, the University of Tübingen, represented by Rector Karla Pollmann, and the Freie Universität Berlin, represented by President Günter M. Ziegler. The managing director is Jan Wöpking. The association's headquarters are in Berlin.

U15 has been a member of the Global Network of Research Universities since November 2014. The network includes the Russell Group (Great Britain, headquartered in London), Association of American Universities (United States of America, headquartered in Washington D.C.), League of European Research Universities (Europe, headquartered in Leuven/Belgium), Association of East Asian Research Universities (China, Japan, South Korea, Hong Kong and Taiwan), C9 League (China), Group of Eight (Australia, headquartered in Canberra), RU11 (Japan), and the U15 Group of Canadian Research Universities (Canada, headquartered in Ottawa).

== Members ==
Location of U15 institutions in Germany

University	Location	State	Est.
Free University of Berlin	Berlin	Berlin	1948
Goethe University Frankfurt	Frankfurt	Hesse	1914
Heidelberg University	Heidelberg	Baden-Württemberg	1386
Humboldt University of Berlin	Berlin	Berlin	1810
Leipzig University	Leipzig	Saxony	1409
LMU Munich	Munich	Bavaria	1472
University of Bonn	Bonn	North Rhine-Westphalia	1818
University of Cologne	Cologne	North Rhine-Westphalia	1388
University of Freiburg	Freiburg	Baden-Württemberg	1457
University of Göttingen	Göttingen	Lower Saxony	1737
University of Hamburg	Hamburg	Hamburg	1919
University of Mainz	Mainz	Rhineland-Palatinate	1477
University of Münster	Münster	North Rhine-Westphalia	1780
University of Tübingen	Tübingen	Baden-Württemberg	1477
University of Würzburg	Würzburg	Bavaria	1402

== See also ==
- TU9: an association of 9 largest universities of technology in Germany
- Golden Triangle (English universities): a group of 6 leading universities in England
- Russell Group: a group of 24 research-based universities in the United Kingdom
- C9 League: an alliance of 9 top universities in China
- RU11: a consortium consisting of 11 top research universities in Japan
- UAS7: An association of 7 German Universities of Applied Sciences
