= Association of American Universities =

Organization of leading research universities

- Formation: February 28, 1900; 126 years ago
- Founded at: Chicago, Illinois, U.S.
- Type: 501(c)(3) nonprofit organization
- Tax ID no.: 52-1945674
- Headquarters: William T. Golden Center for Science and Engineering, Washington, D.C., U.S.
- Locations: United States; Canada
- Coordinates: 38°54′01″N 77°01′42″W
- Members: 73
- President: Barbara Snyder
- Chair: Robert J. Jones
- Website: aau.edu

The Association of American Universities (AAU) is an organization of predominantly American research universities devoted to maintaining a strong system of academic research and education. Founded in 1900, it consists of 71 public and private universities in the United States as well as 2 universities in Canada. AAU membership is by invitation only and requires an affirmative vote of three-quarters of current members.

== History ==
=== 20th century ===
AAU was founded on February 28, 1900, by a group of 14 Doctor of Philosophy degree-granting universities (Note: The Association of American Universities was founded by the University of California, the University of Chicago, Catholic University of America, Clark University, Columbia University, Cornell University, Harvard University, Johns Hopkins University, the University of Michigan, Princeton University, the University of Pennsylvania, Stanford University, the University of Wisconsin, and Yale University, all of which were its first members.) in the United States to strengthen and standardize American doctoral programs. American universities—starting with University of Michigan and Johns Hopkins University in 1876—were adopting the research-intensive German model of higher education. Lack of standardization damaged European universities' opinions of their American counterparts and many American students attended graduate school in Europe instead of staying in the U.S. The presidents of Harvard University, Columbia University, Johns Hopkins University, the University of Chicago, and the University of California sent a letter of invitation to nine other universities—Clark University, Catholic University of America, Cornell University, the University of Michigan, Princeton University, the University of Pennsylvania, Stanford University, the University of Wisconsin, and Yale University—to meet in Chicago in February 1900 to promote and raise standards. The AAU's founding members elected Harvard's Charles William Eliot as the association's first president and Stanford's David Starr Jordan as its first chairman.

In 1914, the AAU began accrediting undergraduate education at its member and other schools. German universities used the "AAU Accepted List" to determine whether a college's graduates were qualified for graduate programs. Regional accreditation agencies existed in the U.S. by the 1920s, and the AAU ended accrediting schools in 1948.

For its first six decades, the AAU functioned as a club for the presidents and deans of elite research universities to informally discuss educational matters, and its day-to-day operations were managed by an executive secretary. In the 1970s, the AAU shifted to a role of active advocacy on behalf of its members' interests; dues were raised, more staff members were hired, and its chief executive was given the title of president and the duty of becoming far more publicly visible than his predecessors.

=== 21st century ===
As of 2026, the AAU consists of 73 U.S. and Canadian universities of varying sizes and missions that share a commitment to research. The two newest members, added in 2026, are Georgetown University and The University of Alabama at Birmingham.

The organization's primary purpose is to provide a forum for the development and implementation of institutional and national policies in order to strengthen programs in academic research, scholarship, and education at the undergraduate, graduate, and professional levels.

=== Benefits ===
The largest attraction of the AAU for many schools, especially nonmembers, is prestige. Since the AAU's founding, it has "been a grouping of the elite in the American university world", and "[n]ew presidents of nonmember universities often list gaining admission to the AAU as a goal of their administration." For example, in 2010 the chancellor of nonmember North Carolina State University described it as "the pre-eminent research-intensive membership group. To be a part of that organization is something N.C. State aspires to." A spokesman for nonmember University of Connecticut called it "perhaps the most elite organization in higher education. You'd probably be hard-pressed to find a major research university that didn't want to be a member of the AAU." In 2012, the newly elected chancellor of University of Massachusetts Amherst, a nonmember of AAU, reaffirmed the objective of elevating the campus to AAU standards and the hope of becoming a member in the near future, and called it a distinctive status. Because of the lengthy and difficult entrance process, boards of trustees, state legislators, and donors often see membership as evidence of the quality of a university.

The AAU's lobbying headquarters is located in Washington, D.C., for research and higher education funding and for policy and regulatory issues affecting research universities. The association holds two meetings annually, both in Washington. Separate meetings are held for university presidents, provosts, and other officials. Because the meetings are private, they offer the opportunity for discussion without media coverage. Prominent government officials, business leaders, and others often speak to the groups.

=== Presidents ===
Executive	Term
Thomas A. Bartlett	1977–1982
Robert M. Rosenzweig	1983–1993
Cornelius J. Pings	1993–1998
Nils Hasselmo	1998–2006
Robert M. Berdahl	2006–2011
Hunter R. Rawlings III	2011–2016
Mary Sue Coleman	2016–2020
Barbara Snyder	2020–present

=== Statistics ===
As of 2004, AAU members accounted for 58 percent (Note: Over $15.9 billion: NIH: $9.1 billion, 60 percent of total academic research funding. Research Funding: National Science Foundation: $2.0 billion, 63 percent of total academic research funding Department of Defense: $1.2 billion, 56 percent of total academic research funding Department of Energy: $505.2 million, 63 percent of total academic research funding NASA: $673.2 million, 57 percent of total academic research funding Department of Agriculture: $271.9 million, 41 percent of total academic research funding.) of U.S. universities' research grants and contract income and 52 percent of all doctorates awarded in the United States. Since 1999, 43 percent of all Nobel Prize winners and 74 percent of winners at U.S. institutions have been affiliated with an AAU university. Approximately two-thirds of the American Academy of Arts and Sciences 2006 Class of Fellows are affiliated with an AAU university.

AAU facts and figures
Category	Number in 2008	National percentage	Number in 2024	Percentage
Undergraduate students	1,044,759	7%	1,510,000	13%
Undergraduate degrees awarded	235,328	17%	361,273	18%
Graduate students	418,066	20%	756,289	23%
Non professional master's degrees awarded	106,971	19%	217,856	21%
Professional doctorate and masters degrees awarded	20,859	25%	31,098	
Research doctorates awarded	22,747	52%	34,666	60%
Postdoctoral fellows	30,430	67%	46,334	70%
Students studying abroad	57,205	22%	92,971	34%
National Merit/Achievement Scholars	5,434	63%		
Members of the United States National Academies	2,993	82%		
Faculty	72,000	5%		

== Membership ==
AAU membership is by invitation only, which requires an affirmative vote of three-fourths of current members. Invitations are considered periodically, based in part on an assessment of the breadth and quality of university programs of research and graduate education, as well as undergraduate education. The association ranks its members using four criteria: research spending, the percentage of faculty who are members of the National Academies, faculty awards, and citations. Non-member universities whose research and education profile exceeds that of a number of current members may be invited to join the association; current members whose research and education profile falls significantly below that of other current members or below the criteria for admission of new members will be subject to further review and possible discontinuation of membership. A vote by two-thirds of the member institutions can revoke membership for poor rankings. As of 2022 annual dues are $139,500. All 71 U.S. members of the AAU are also classified as Highest Research Activity (R1) Universities by the Carnegie Classification of Institutions of Higher Education, as are four of the five former AAU members.

Current members
Institution	State or province	Control	Established	Year joined	Total students	Medical school (LCME accredited)	Engineering program (ABET accredited)	Land-Grant Institution (NIFA)	Federally funded FY23 R&D exp. (Dollars in thousands)
Arizona State University	Arizona	Public	1885	2023	144,800	✗ (Note: Arizona State University John Shufeldt School of Medicine and Medical Engineering has received preliminary accreditation.)	✓	✗	340,880
Boston University	Massachusetts	Private	1839	2012	36,729	✓	✓	✗	409,551
Brandeis University	Massachusetts	Private	1948	1985	5,808	✗	✗	✗	46,654
Brown University	Rhode Island	Private	1764	1933	8,619	✓	✓	✗	239,744
California Institute of Technology	California	Private	1891	1934	2,231	✗	✓	✗	310,519
Carnegie Mellon University	Pennsylvania	Private	1900	1982	12,908	✗	✓	✗	279,954
Case Western Reserve University	Ohio	Private	1826	1969	12,201	✓	✓	✗	431,736
Columbia University	New York	Private	1754	1900	29,250	✓	✓	✗	988,670
Cornell University	New York	Private	1865	1900	21,904	✓	✓	✓	705,132
Dartmouth College	New Hampshire	Private	1769	2019	6,571	✓	✓	✗	168,740
Duke University	North Carolina	Private	1838	1938	14,600	✓	✓	✗	974,202
Emory University	Georgia	Private	1836	1995	14,513	✓	✗ (Note: Although Emory shares a joint engineering department with Georgia Tech, the program is accredited through Georgia Tech.)	✗	664,370
George Washington University	District of Columbia	Private	1821	2023	26,457	✓	✓	✗	162,892
Georgia Tech	Georgia	Public	1885	2010	29,370	✗	✓	✗	1,083,903
Georgetown University	District of Columbia	Private	1789	2026	20,031	✓	✗	✗	
Harvard University	Massachusetts	Private	1636	1900	21,000	✓	✓	✗	639,953
Indiana University Bloomington	Indiana	Public	1820	1909	42,731	✗ (Note: While the funding numbers of the Indiana University School of Medicine are reported through IUB, IUSM is accredited through its main campus at Indiana University Indianapolis)	✓	✗	432,223
Johns Hopkins University	Maryland	Private	1876	1900	23,073	✓	✓	✗	3,324,551
Massachusetts Institute of Technology	Massachusetts	Private	1861	1934	11,319	✗	✓	✓ (Note: USDA has confirmed that MIT is eligible to apply for grants that are available only to land-grant institutions, the State of Massachusetts chooses to allocate its federal capacity appropriations to the University of Massachusetts, Amherst.)	559,766
McGill University	Quebec	Public	1821	1926	36,904	✓	✓	✗	N/A
Michigan State University	Michigan	Public	1855	1964	51,316	✓	✓	✓	435,564
New York University	New York	Private	1831	1950	61,950	✓	✓	✗	787,204
Northwestern University	Illinois	Private	1851	1917	21,208	✓	✓	✗	678,062
The Ohio State University	Ohio	Public	1870	1916	60,540	✓	✓	✓	694,647
Pennsylvania State University	Pennsylvania	Quasi-public (Note: As members of the Commonwealth System of Higher Education, Penn State and Pittsburgh are privately governed but receive funding from the Pennsylvania state government.)	1855	1958	45,518	✓	✓	✓	781,303
Princeton University	New Jersey	Private	1746	1900	8,010	✗	✓	✗	219,600
Purdue University	Indiana	Public	1869	1958	52,211	✗	✓	✓	385,738
Rice University	Texas	Private	1912	1985	8,212	✗	✓	✗	119,853
Rutgers University–New Brunswick	New Jersey	Public	1766	1989	41,565	✓	✓	✓	400,930
Stanford University	California	Private	1891	1900	15,877	✓	✓	✗	943,669
Stony Brook University	New York	Public	1957	2001	26,814	✓	✓	✗	192,448
Texas A&M University	Texas	Public	1876	2001	77,491	✓	✓	✓	546,481
Tufts University	Massachusetts	Private	1852	2021	11,024	✓	✓	✗	154,458
Tulane University	Louisiana	Private	1834	1958	13,462	✓	✓	✗	152,468
University at Buffalo	New York	Public	1846	1989	30,183	✓	✓	✗	257,857
University of Alabama at Birmingham	Alabama	Public	1969	2026	20,905	✓	✓	✗	
University of Arizona	Arizona	Public	1885	1985	40,223	✓	✓	✓	434,700
University of California, Berkeley	California	Public	1868	1900	36,204	✗ (Note: The University of California, Berkeley is closely tied with the LCME-accredited University of California, San Francisco, which only provides graduate-level courses. The two universities share a joint program.)	✓	✓	496,298
University of California, Davis	California	Public	1905	1996	34,175	✓	✓	✓	494,847
University of California, Irvine	California	Public	1965	1996	29,588	✓	✓	✓	335,393
University of California, Los Angeles	California	Public	1919	1974	42,163	✓	✓	✓	878,571
University of California, Riverside	California	Public	1954	2023	26,809	✓	✓	✓	120,524
University of California, San Diego	California	Public	1960	1982	30,310	✓	✓	✓	1,083,790
University of California, Santa Barbara	California	Public	1944	1995	25,057	✗	✓	✓	179,896
University of California, Santa Cruz	California	Public	1965	2019	19,457	✗	✓	✓	112,847
University of Chicago	Illinois	Private	1890	1900	14,954	✓	✓	✗	476,689
University of Colorado Boulder	Colorado	Public	1876	1966	32,775	✗	✓	✗	538,715
University of Florida	Florida	Public	1853	1985	55,781	✓	✓	✓	529,391
University of Illinois Urbana-Champaign	Illinois	Public	1867	1908	44,520	✓	✓	✓	460,491
University of Iowa	Iowa	Public	1847	1909	31,065	✓	✓	✗	331,824
University of Kansas	Kansas	Public	1865	1909	27,983	✓	✓	✗	211,111
University of Maryland, College Park	Maryland	Public	1856	1969	37,631	✗	✓	✓	825,546
University of Miami	Florida	Private	1925	2023	19,402	✓	✓	✗	291,783
University of Michigan	Michigan	Public	1817	1900	43,426	✓	✓	✗	1,041,430
University of Minnesota	Minnesota	Public	1851	1908	52,376	✓	✓	✓	702,483
University of Missouri	Missouri	Public	1839	1908	35,441	✓	✓	✓	217,091
University of North Carolina at Chapel Hill	North Carolina	Public	1789	1922	29,390	✓	✗ (Note: UNC Chapel Hill offers an ABET accredited Biomedical Engineering degree jointly with North Carolina State University. The engineering courses are offered through the NC State College of Engineering, while the medical courses are offered through UNC Chapel Hill.)	✗	907,710
University of Notre Dame	Indiana	Private	1842	2023	12,809	✗	✓	✗	147,985
University of Oregon	Oregon	Public	1876	1969	22,980	✗	✗	✗	100,265
University of Pennsylvania	Pennsylvania	Private	1740	1900	24,630	✓	✓	✗	936,469
University of Pittsburgh	Pennsylvania	Quasi-public	1787	1974	28,649	✓	✓	✗	916,735
University of Rochester	New York	Private	1850	1941	10,290	✓	✓	✗	368,190
University of South Florida	Florida	Public	1956	2023	49,766	✓	✓	✗	242,224
University of Southern California	California	Private	1880	1969	48,500	✓	✓	✗	683,819
University of Texas at Austin	Texas	Public	1883	1929	51,913	✓	✓	✗	621,223
University of Toronto	Ontario	Public	1827	1926	97,678	✓	✓	✗	N/A
University of Utah	Utah	Public	1850	2019	32,994	✓	✓	✗	416,079
University of Virginia	Virginia	Public	1819	1904	24,360	✓	✓	✗	354,748
University of Washington	Washington	Public	1861	1950	43,762	✓	✓	✗	1,188,836
University of Wisconsin–Madison	Wisconsin	Public	1848	1900	43,275	✓	✓	✓	816,814
Vanderbilt University	Tennessee	Private	1873	1950	12,795	✓	✓	✗	751,019
Washington University in St. Louis	Missouri	Private	1853	1923	14,117	✓	✓	✗	758,464
Yale University	Connecticut	Private	1701	1900	13,609	✓	✓	✗	741,198

Former members
	State or province	Control	Established	Year joined	Year left	Total students
Catholic University of America (Note: Departed as a result of "institutional emphases and energies" that differed from the other AAU members.)	Washington, D.C.	Private	1887	1900	2002	5,366 (2022)
Clark University (Note: Departed because of a shift in the AAU's emphasis to large research universities.)	Massachusetts	Private	1887	1900	1999	3,559 (2025)
Iowa State University (Note: Iowa State departed claiming that AAU's internal ranking indicators unfairly favor institutions with high levels of NIH funding and noted that its strength is not in biomedical research because the school does not have a medical school.)	Iowa	Public	1858	1958	2022	31,105 (2025)
Syracuse University (Note: Because of a dispute over how to count nonfederal grants, Syracuse voluntarily withdrew from the AAU in 2011. The Chronicle of Higher Education reported that after "it became clear that Syracuse wouldn't meet the association's revised membership criteria, university officials decided that they would leave the organization voluntarily, rather than face a vote like Nebraska's, and notified the leadership of their intentions.")	New York	Private	1870	1966	2011	22,589 (2024)
University of Nebraska–Lincoln (Note: Removed from the AAU. Chancellor Harvey Perlman said that the lack of an on-campus medical school (the Medical Center is a separate campus of the University of Nebraska system) and the AAU's disregarding of USDA-funded agricultural research in its metrics hurt the university's performance in the association's internal ranking system. In 2010, Perlman stated that had Nebraska not been part of the AAU, the Big Ten Conference would likely not have invited it to become the athletic conference's 12th member.)	Nebraska	Public	1869	1909	2011	23,954 (2025)

A map of the AAU schools, with private schools marked blue and public schools marked red. Five private schools in Greater Boston, as well as two private schools each in Washington, D.C. and New York City, are not labeled separately due to their close geographic proximity: Greater Boston consists of Boston University, Brandeis, Harvard, MIT, and Tufts; Washington, D.C. consists of Georgetown and George Washington University; and New York City consists of Columbia and NYU.

== Advocacy ==
In 2014, the AAU supported the proposed Research and Development Efficiency Act arguing that the legislation "can lead to a long-needed reduction in the regulatory burden currently imposed on universities and their faculty members who conduct research on behalf of the federal government." According to the AAU, "too often federal requirements" for accounting for federal grant money "are ill-conceived, ineffective, and/or duplicative." This wastes the researchers' times and "reduces the time they can devote to discovery and innovation and increases institutional compliance costs."

== Similar organizations in other countries ==
Similar organizations around the world include the Russell Group (United Kingdom), U15 (Germany), League of European Research Universities (Europe), BRICS Universities League (BRICS), Association of East Asian Research Universities (mainland China, Japan, South Korea, Hong Kong, and Taiwan), C9 League (China), Group of Eight (Australia), RU11 (Japan), and the U15 Group of Canadian Research Universities (Canada).

== See also ==
- List of higher education associations and alliances
- List of research universities in the United States
