= Barke =

Barke may refer to:

- Barke (film)
- Barke language, an Afro-Asiatic language
- Barque, sometimes spelled "barke"

== People with the surname ==
- Erich Barke (born 1946), German emeritus professor
- Brady Barke, athletic director
- Jürgen Barke (born 1962), German politician
- Lloyd Barke (1916–1976), English professional footballer
- Melton Barke (1903–1977), American filmmaker
- Edmund Sonuga-Barke, British psychologist and academic

== Places ==
- Barke, alternative name of Barca (ancient city)

== See also ==
- Barker (disambiguation)
