= TU9 =

University alliance of German institutes of technology

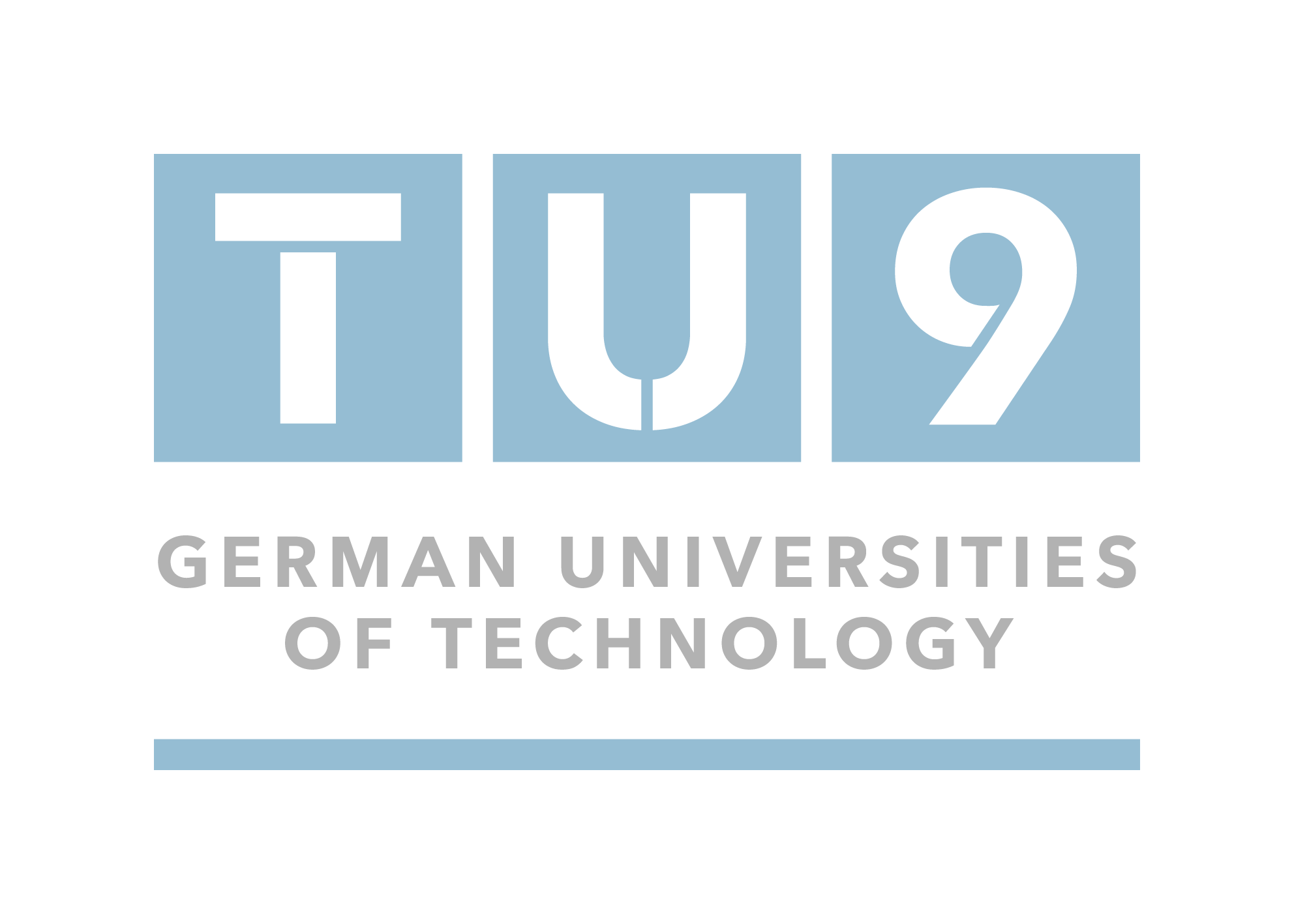
Logo of TU9

Location of TU9 institutions in Germany

TU9 German Universities of Technology e. V. is the alliance of nine leading universities of technology in Germany. The current joint-leadership of the TU9 consists of the two co-presidents Prof. Dr.-Ing. Peter Middendorf, rector of the University of Stuttgart, and Prof. Dr. Angela Ittel, president of the TU Braunschweig.

== Overview ==
TU9 was established in 2003 as an informal consortium of those Institutes of Technology in Germany which were established before 1900. The founding president of TU9 is Horst Hippler, also president of the University of Karlsruhe. The registered association ("e. V.") TU9 German Institutes of Technology e. V. was solemnly founded on January 26, 2006, at TU Braunschweig. Its head office is in Berlin. The following presidents (or their representatives) attended foundation and signed the certificate of incorporation:

- Konstantin Meskouris, prorector of RWTH Aachen
- Jörg Steinbach, vice president of TU Berlin
- Jürgen Hesselbach, president of TU Braunschweig
- Johann-Dietrich Wörner, president of TU Darmstadt
- Hermann Kokenge, rector of TU Dresden
- Erich Barke, president of Leibniz University Hannover
- Horst Hippler, rector of Karlsruhe Institute of Technology
- Wolfgang A. Herrmann, president of the TU Munich
- Peter Middendorf, rector of University of Stuttgart

The mission of this organization is to act as contact for society, economy and politics, particularly for the university education of engineers. The members of TU9 mutually accredit their bachelor's and master's degrees and, therefore, support the progression of the Bologna process and quality assurance concerning university education of engineers.

Note: Some technical universities, such as TU Chemnitz, TU Clausthal, TU Dortmund, TU Hamburg, TU Ilmenau, the newly founded Brandenburg University of Technology (BTU), University of Technology Nuremberg (UTN), and RPTU University Kaiserslautern-Landau, are not included in TU9 due to their founding timelines and the consortium's static scope.

== Policy on higher education ==
Associated especially through their core subjects, the engineering sciences, the members of TU9 pay attention particularly to the public perception of topics with high relevance to these sciences. This includes analysis of statistics about third-party funds and the description of the importance of the TU9 universities concerning graduates.

== Position in Germany ==
According to the research report 2018 of the German Research Foundation (DFG), TU9 universities are among the universities with the highest third-party funding in Germany. They received more than one-fifth (21%) of all DFG grants across all scientific disciplines. The TU Dresden received the highest number of DFG grants in electrical engineering, the TU Darmstadt in computer science and the RWTH Aachen in mechanical engineering. In a competitive selection process, the DFG selects the best research projects from researchers at universities and research institutes and finances them. The ranking is thus regarded as an indicator of the quality of research. In the profile area of engineering, almost 50% of the DFG funding volume goes to TU9 universities. Almost a quarter of all recipients of a European Research Council grant, the highest endowed science prize of the European Union, preferred one of the TU9 universities. RWTH Aachen and TU Darmstadt are among the universities with the highest number of top managers in the German economy. They belong to the top 3 universities. Five of the eleven German Universities of Excellence are TU9 universities (RWTH Aachen, TU Berlin, TU Dresden, KIT, and TU Munich). Three of the five German National Competence Centers for Artificial Intelligence at universities are based at TU9 universities (TU Berlin, TU Dresden, and TU Munich).

== Members ==
University	Location	State	Est.
Karlsruhe Institute of Technology	Karlsruhe	Baden-Württemberg	2009
Leibniz University Hannover	Hanover	Lower Saxony	1831
RWTH Aachen	Aachen	North Rhine-Westphalia	1870
TU Berlin	Berlin	Berlin	1879
TU Braunschweig	Braunschweig	Lower Saxony	1745
TU Darmstadt	Darmstadt	Hesse	1877
TU Dresden	Dresden	Saxony	1828
TU Munich	Munich	Bavaria	1868
University of Stuttgart	Stuttgart	Baden-Württemberg	1829

== See also ==
- U15 – association of fifteen largest universities in Germany (not including universities of technology)
- Golden Triangle (English universities) – a group of leading English universities
- Russell Group – a group of research-based universities in the United Kingdom
- C9 League – The Chinese Ministry of Education's formal grouping of elite universities in China
- UAS7 – strategic alliance of seven leading German Universities of Applied Sciences
- Taiwan Comprehensive University System – an alliance with TU9 has a transnational partnership
