= Walter Leal Filho =

German-Brazilian scientist

Walter Leal Filho (born 1965 in Salvador, Brazil) is a German-Brazilian environmental and sustainability scientist. He is Professor of Climate Change Management at HAW Hamburg, Professor of Environment and Technology at Manchester Metropolitan University, Director of the Research and Transfer Center for Sustainability and Climate Change Management, initiator of international sustainability networks and coordinator of numerous large-scale research projects.

== Research and work ==
His main research interests are sustainable development, particularly of universities and higher education institutions, and climate change, with a focus on health, as well as linking the theory and practice of sustainability. His interests and publications cover a wide range of topics.

One of his globally influential research focuses is the research, teaching and practice of sustainability (education for sustainable development) of universities, in particular the transformation of universities towards sustainability. Since the Rio Earth Summit in 1992, he has been an international pioneer for ESD, particularly for the implementation of the Copernicus University Charter for Sustainable Development (1994) and similar declarations. As early as 1996, he published the first international monograph and working aid on the implementation of sustainability at universities, which was followed by numerous publications, including the founding editor of the International Journal of Sustainability in Higher Education (IJSHE), which was launched in 2000. The IJSHE is the only journal that focuses entirely on sustainability in the higher education context.

Walter Leal is the author and co-editor of numerous publications on the environment, sustainable development and climate change. He has published more than 1000 publications, including 196 books. Among other things, he is editor-in-chief of the Encyclopedia of the UN Sustainable Development Goals, which is currently being prepared with 17 volumes and 2300 authors and is considered the largest editorial project on sustainable development issues.

== Networks ==
Walter Leal is founder of the European School of Sustainability Science and Research, of the Inter-University Sustainable Development Research Programme (IUSDRP), the European-North American Sustainability Research Consortium and of the German and Brazilian Science and Technology Network (GERBRAS-SCIENCENET).

He was Review Editor (AR5), Lead Author and Contributing Author (AR6) of the Intergovernmental Panel on Climate Change and is founder and chairmen of the International Climate Change Research and Information Programme (ICCIRP).

== Publications (selection) ==
- Leal Filho, Walter, ed.: Forschung für Nachhaltigkeit an deutschen Hochschulen. Springer Spektrum, 2016
- Leal Filho, Walter, ed.: Handbook of sustainability science and research. Springer International Publishing, 2018
- Leal Filho, Walter et al., eds.: Handbook of theory and practice of sustainable development in higher education. Vol. 1. Berlin, Germany: Springer, 2017
- Leal Filho, Walter: Nachhaltigkeit in der Lehre. Springer Berlin Heidelberg, 2018
- Leal Filho, Walter: Sustainability at universities: opportunities, challenges and trends. (2009)

== See also ==
- Education for sustainable development
