= Barker =

Barker may refer to:

== Occupations ==
- Barker (occupation), a person who attempts to attract patrons to entertainment events
- Barker (coachbuilder), a builder of horse-drawn coaches and later of bodywork for prestige cars
- a person who strips tanbark from trees to supply bark mills

== People ==
- Barker (surname), a list of people
- Barker Burnell (1798–1843), U.S. Representative from Massachusetts
- Barker Fairley (1887–1986), British-Canadian painter and scholar of German literature

== Places ==
=== Antarctica ===
- Barker Range, Victoria Land, a mountain range
- Barker Peak, off the coast of Victoria Land
- Barker Bank, Graham Land, a marine bank
- Barker Nunatak, Palmer Land

=== Australia ===
- Division of Barker, an Electoral Division in South Australia for the Australian House of Representatives
- Mount Barker (South Australia)
- Barker Inlet, South Australia
- Barker River, Western Australia
- Barker Passage, Western Australia, a water channel

=== United States ===
- Barker, Broome County, New York, a town
- Barker, Niagara County, New York, a village
- Barker, Texas, an unincorporated community
- Barker, West Virginia, an unincorporated community
- Barker Reservoir, near Houston, Texas

=== Elsewhere ===
- Barker, Uruguay, a town
- 7868 Barker, an asteroid

== Man-made structures ==
- Barker Field, several former airfields in Toronto, Canada
- Barker Building, Omaha, Nebraska, on the U.S. National Register of Historic Places
- Barker General Store, Beecher Hollow, New York, on the U.S. National Register of Historic Places
- Barker Mill, Auburn, Maine, on the U.S. National Register of Historic Places
- Barker Dam (California), on the U.S. National Register of Historic Places
- Barker Dam at Barker Meadow Reservoir, Colorado, United States
- Barker Ranch, last hideout of Charles Manson and his "family"
- Barker railway station, Melbourne, Australia

== Other uses ==
- Barker baronets, five baronetcies, all extinct
- Barker channel, a television channel with programming comprising mainly advertising
- Barker College, a private college in Sydney, Australia
- Barker's Discount Department Stores, a retail chain in the United States and the Caribbean
- Barkers of Kensington, a London department store
- Dog, a domesticated animal whose vocalizations include barking
- USS Barker (DD-213), a destroyer which served in World War II
- The Barker, a 1928 film
- The Barkers, Australian musical group

== See also ==
- Barkers, New Zealand menswear retail chain
- Barkers Creek, West Virginia, United States
- Mount Barker (disambiguation)
