= FH Münster =

German university in Münster and Steinfurt

Coordinates: 51.961°N 7.60809°E

- Type: Public University
- Established: 1971
- President: Frank Dellmann
- Administrative staff: 1,375, of which professors: 309
- Students: 14.117
- Location: Münster and Steinfurt, North Rhine-Westphalia, Deutschland
- Website: www.fh-muenster.de

FH Münster – University of Applied Sciences (abbreviated to FH Münster) is a public university located in the city of Münster, North Rhine-Westphalia, Germany, with an additional campus in Steinfurt.

The university was founded in 1971 and, with around 14,100 students and 1,400 staff across 12 faculties, is one of the largest universities of applied sciences in Germany.

== History ==
FH Münster was founded on 1 August 1971 as one of 15 universities of applied sciences in North Rhine-Westphalia. It was created by merging two engineering schools, one school of applied arts, and five higher vocational schools for home economics in Münster and Burgsteinfurt into a new institution. Shortly afterwards, the newly founded faculties of Business Administration as well as the Faculty of Social Work were added. At that time, the number of students was about 2,300, making it one of the smaller universities of applied sciences in the then Federal Republic of Germany. In 1990, what is now the Department of Engineering Physics was founded, followed in 1994 by what is now the Münster Department of Health.

Within the urban areas of Münster and Burgsteinfurt, the university was spread across several buildings and also used the former engineering school building for civil engineering on Lotharinger Strasse as well as the school of applied arts on Sentmaringer Weg. From 1972, the campus in Steinfurt, which had been built from 1969 onwards, was used for some of the engineering and technical faculties. In 1974, the University of Applied Sciences Centre (FHZ) was established on Corrensstrasse in Münster. In 2000, the Münster School of Architecture and the Münster Department of Health moved to the newly created Leonardo Campus; in 2006, the new building for the Münster School of Design was completed on the campus.

== Faculties and Central Scientific Unit ==
FH Münster is divided into twelve departments, seven of which are in Münster, the other five in Steinfurt. The largest faculties are the Münster School of Business and the Department of Social Work.

- Münster School of Architecture
- Department of Civil Engineering
- Department of Chemical Engineering
- Münster School of Design
- Department of Electrical Engineering and Computer Science
- Department of Energy - Building Services- Environmental Engineering
- Münster Department of Health
- Department of Mechanical Engineering
- Department of Food - Nutrition - Facilities
- Department of Engineering Physics
- Department of Social Work
- Münster School of Business

There is also one Central Scientific Unit, the Münster Center For Interdisciplinarity (MCI). There students can train to become vocational school teachers or industrial engineers in one of its institutes:

- Institute for Vocational Teacher Training (IBL)
- Institute of Business Administration and Engineering (ITB)
- Institute for Transdisciplinarity (IFT)

== Research institutes ==
FH Münster has established selected research fields as permanent institutes:

Institute of Energy and Process Engineering (IEP)

The IEP’s stated goal is to promote professional exchange and expand research activities on energy-related topics. Researchers from the faculties of Mechanical Engineering, Civil Engineering, Electrical Engineering & Computer Science, and Energy · Buildings · Environment pool their expertise and contribute their specialist knowledge.

Institute for Society and Digitalisation (GUD)

At GUD, designers, computer scientists, and social scientists from FH Münster work together across disciplines. The interdisciplinary research team aims to use information technology and media design to address contemporary social issues and challenges.

Institute for Infrastructure · Water · Resources · Environment (IWARU)

At IWARU, applied research and development are carried out in the fields of water, environment, resources, and energy. Its range of activities extends from environmental engineering systems and measures to numerical process modelling and large-scale cycle analyses. Sustainable water, resource, and energy supply as well as a high level of environmental quality and quality of life are central to its work.

Institute for Structural and Functional Materials (IKFM)

The IKFM brings together the know-how of researchers from four different faculties at FH Münster who conduct research in the field of structural and functional materials. IKFM serves as an interface between clients and researchers and helps coordinate complex areas of responsibility.

Institute for Sustainable Nutrition (iSuN)

The Institute for Sustainable Food Production and Nutrition (iSuN) deals with the sustainability transformation of the food system in transdisciplinary projects. Research focuses include “Sustainable Business Practices” and “Economy for the Common Good”, “Reduction of Food Waste”, “Regional Food”, “Sensory Experience, Enjoyment and Taste”, and “Product Development and Appreciation”. Research at iSuN is dedicated to developing concepts, products, and services for a future-proof diet, implemented together with practice partners.

Institute of Optical Technologies (IOT)

The IOT specialises in new methods for generating, applying, and manipulating light. This includes investigations in the field of light generation, for example into new light-emitting materials for LEDs and lasers. Research also focuses on photovoltaics and the use of light for biomedical purposes. In addition, it works on manipulating light using self-developed, computer-controlled deformable mirrors that are used in lasers and astronomical telescopes.

Institute for Process Management and Digital Transformation (IPD)

The IPD is a practice-oriented research institute that aims to make the knowledge it gains accessible and applicable to a broad range of stakeholders through transfer and continuing education. It contributes to the further development of the disciplines of logistics, process management, and digital transformation. Practical application and knowledge transfer are its main priorities, which is why projects are preferably carried out with practice partners.

Institute Network for Resources, Energy and Infrastructure The Institute Network for Resources, Energy and Infrastructure is a combination of the Institute of Energy and Process Engineering (IEP) and the Institute for Infrastructure · Water · Resources · Environment (IWARU), as well as its underground construction division (IuB).

== International cooperative agreements and contacts ==
FH Münster currently has around 324 active international university contacts (as of summer semester 2026), some 180 of which are via the European exchange programme, ERASMUS.

FH Münster is a member of the higher education consortium UAS7, an alliance of seven research-oriented universities of applied sciences with an international outlook. The shared objective is to foster cooperation with higher education institutions in North and South America.

In addition, Münster University of Applied Sciences is a member of UP University. UP University is an alliance of 11 universities and universities of applied sciences strategically located in medium-sized cities throughout Europe.

== Further facilities ==
=== TAFH Münster GmbH ===
The TAFH Münster GmbH is the central innovation support and project development company of FH Münster. Its purpose is to connect experts from academia and practice so that they can jointly launch innovative projects. Possible forms of cooperation are, for example, research and development, continuing education, or start-up creation.

=== Wandelwerk ===
Wandelwerk is the university’s central Quality Management and institutional development unit. The department focuses on higher education management, curriculum design, and university didactics.

=== PLUSPUNKT ===
In the so-called PLUSPUNKT programme, students at FH Münster can take part in free events that offer additional qualifications alongside their regular studies. These are divided into four thematic areas:

- Self-knowledge, social skills, and methodological skills
- Entrepreneurial skills
- Intercultural knowledge
- Digital skills

=== Competence Centre for Humanitarian Aid ===
Founded in 2001, the interdisciplinary institution Competence Centre for Humanitarian Aid provides emergency assistance and essential services in Germany and abroad, particularly after natural disasters and violent catastrophes. Authorities, companies, initiatives, and institutions from academia and business work together in a network. In cooperation with the German Red Cross, the Competence Centre for Humanitarian Aid regularly offers students the opportunity to train emergency assistance skills in certified simulation exercises.

=== School Network ===
The School Network regularly organises events for school pupils. These include information days such as the annual university day, Girl’s Day, as well as the opportunity to attend lectures. The School Network cooperates with various grammar schools and secondary schools in the Münsterland region.

=== Language Centre ===
The Language Centre at FH Münster offers students and staff the opportunity to expand their language skills in decentralised, computer-supported self-study phases or through classroom teaching, offering courses from beginner level to advanced users. In addition, the Language Centre is a certified test centre for the internationally recognised TOEIC test.

== Rankings and awards ==
FH Münster has received recognition in several university rankings and has obtained funding for research and teaching initiatives.

=== Studycheck Award ===
Students and alumni voted FH Münster the most popular university in North Rhine-Westphalia on studickeck.de.

=== CHE Ranking ===
In recent years, FH Münster has consistently received outstanding ratings in the CHE ranking. For example, the International Business & Management and Business Informatics programs performed exceptionally well in the 2026 ranking.

In 2025, the Civil Engineering and Chemical Engineering programs achieved very good results, and in 2024, the Master’s program in Computer Science did the same.

=== EFMD seal of quality ===
The International Business & Management and International Marketing & Sales degree programs were reaccredited by the EFMD Committee in 2026 for a period of five years.
