= Mount Barker =

Mount Barker may refer to:

- District Council of Mount Barker, a local government area in South Australia
- Mount Barker, South Australia, a town
- Mount Barker railway station, South Australia
- Mount Barker Road, South Australia
- Mount Barker (South Australia), a mountain
- Mount Barker, Western Australia, a town

== See also ==
- Barker (disambiguation)
