= City University of Applied Sciences =

German University of Applied Sciences

Coordinates: 53°04′21″N 8°47′37″E

Hochschule Bremen – City University of Applied Sciences
- Hochschule Bremen (HSB)
- Type: Public
- Established: 1982
- Rector: Konrad Wolf
- Students: about 9,000
- Location: Bremen, Germany
- Website: Official website
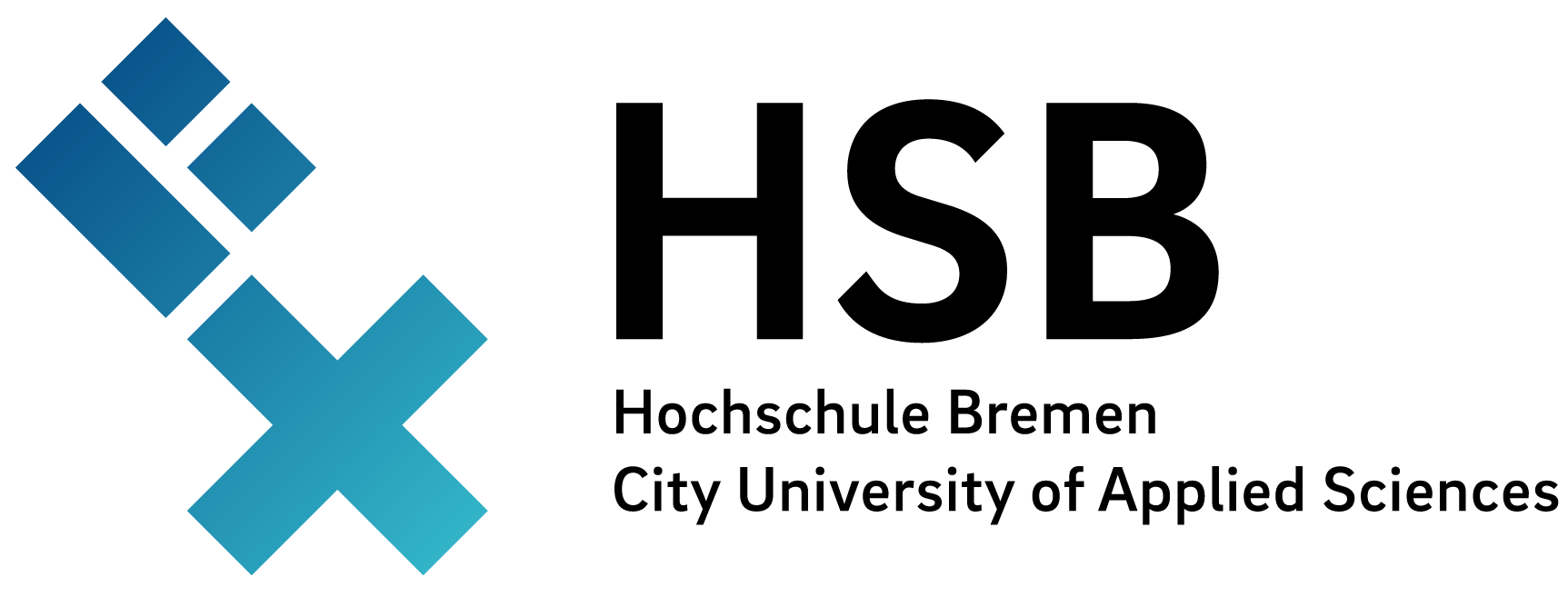

Founded in 1982, Hochschule Bremen – City University of Applied Sciences (short: HSB) (German: Hochschule Bremen (HSB)) is a public University of Applied Sciences (UAS) located in Bremen, Germany.

In 1982, this university evolved from the fusion of four Universities of Applied Sciences in Bremen: the Universities for technology, business, social pedagogy and social economy, and nautics.

It is the second largest academic institution in the federal state of Bremen. Round 9,000 students from over 100 countries (12/2024) are enrolled in about 70 degree programmes across five faculties. In the field of continuing education the International Graduate Centre (IGC) enhances the range of study programmes. Since September 2023 Konrad Wolf is Rektor of the HSB.

== Campus ==
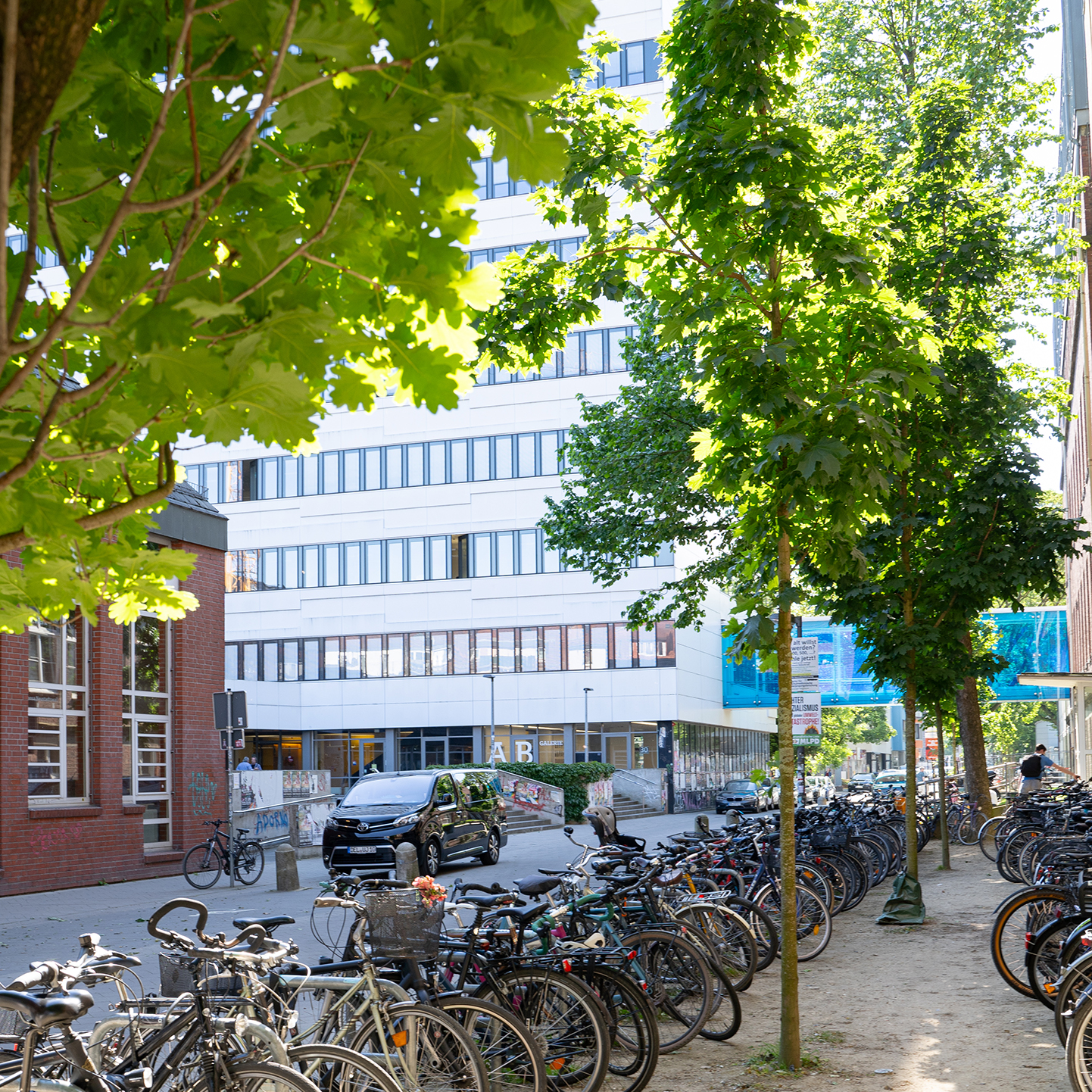
Neustadtswall campus: View of the main administration building and the mensa area.

HSB is spread across various locations in the city of Bremen. The main campus, including HSB's central administration, is located in Bremen's Neustadt (German article) on Neustadtswall (German article). Details can be found on the overview map at the top of this page.

== Studies ==
=== Students ===
Around 9,000 students are enrolled at the HSB (56% male and 44% female) in about 70 degree courses (40 Bachelor- / 30 Master's degree courses). More than 60% of the degree programmes include the option of studying abroad or doing an internship. At the beginning of the 2024/2025 academic year, the students were distributed as follows to the different fields: around 2,800 in economics, almost 4,200 in engineering and natural sciences, the so-called STEM subjects, and more than 1,600 in health and social sciences.

=== Study programmes ===
Hochschule Bremen has over 370 cooperation agreements with foreign universities (2025). The majority of study programmes include a stay abroad. Some study programmes award double degrees. In addition, several master's programmes are offered entirely in English in the fields of engineering and economics.

In 2024, the International Graduate Centre (IGC) at HSB celebrated its 20th anniversary. The IGC offers international full-time MBA and master's programmes in English for students from Germany and abroad.

Since 2019, HSB is system-accredited by the Agency for Quality Assurance through Accreditation of Study Programmes AQAS). HSB is a member of the German network UAS7, an association of seven research-oriented universities of applied sciences with a strong international focus.

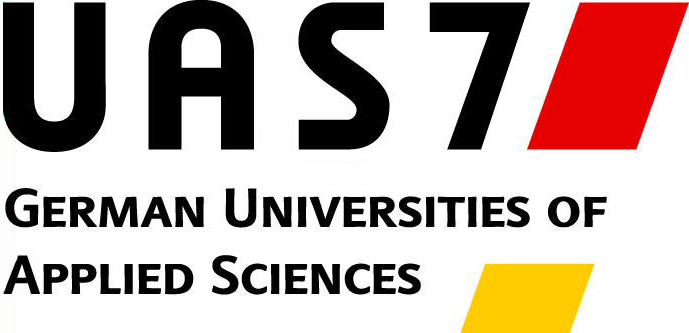
UAS7

It is also a founding member of the international consortium Strategic Alliance for Regional Transition European University – STARS EU for short, which is funded by the EU programme European Universities 2023 Erasmus+ and is an association of nine European universities with the aim of establishing a European university.

=== International Days ===
Once a year the International Days take place at the Hochschule Bremen – City University of Applied Sciences. This event takes two days and is organized by students of the 7th semester of the School of International Business, together with exchange students.

At the International Days, students who spent their 5th and 6th semesters abroad present their experiences through information stands, presentations, photographs and food. They also answer questions from other students and visitors. Exchange students from African, European and South American countries present their home countries at stands and assist students in the 7th semester.

This event can be seen as a communication platform for the students of lower semesters, who still have to complete their semester abroad, but it is accessible for every interested person, too. The International Days presents themselves as an opportunity to get information that may help them to take their decision for the destination of their semester abroad. Additionally it is a possibility to collect contacts e.g. for house hunting and internships. Also, presentations about financing possibilities as well as about the different education systems in foreign countries are given by external companies and organisations.

== Entry requirements ==
The general entry requirements are the advanced technical college entrance qualification or the A-levels. Further more there are specific requirements in each degree course like internships, language skills, apprenticeship etc.. Normally the entry of a master's degree course requires a successfully obtained bachelor's degree. Beyond that Bremen offers two further entry possibilities:

1. The extra accreditation which requires: A main residence in Bremen and surrounding rural districts for at least 1 year, A completed apprenticeship and An examination with a degree as Master, technician or Master of Business Administration etc.
2. The classification test which requires: A main residence in Bremen and surrounding rural districts for at least 1 year, An apprenticeship for at least 2 years, an alternative would be the job as skilled labor for at least 5 years, Job-related experiences for at least 3 years in one of the domains of the aimed study, Participation in further and professional training.

== Faculties ==
HSB – City University of Applied Sciences offers a broad academic portfolio across five faculties. The university combines engineering, natural sciences, business, social sciences and health-related disciplines. In 2025, about 70 study programmes are available, including Bachelor's, Master's and MBA degrees. 17 Bachelor programmes are offered in dual formats.

=== Faculty 1: School of International Business (SIB) ===
This faculty offers 24 programmes structured in three teaching areas:

- Management & International Affairs
- Management & Technology
- Management & Governance

The faculty provides 15 Bachelor's programmes (4 dual) and 9 Master's/MBA programmes.

==== Center for International and Business Affairs (ZIP) ====
The ZIP organises study abroad and practical phases at home and abroad for our students as well as the study stay of more than 200 incoming students each year.

=== Faculty 2: Architecture, Civil and Environmental Engineering ===
There are two departments:

- School of Architecture offering Architecture (B.A.) and Environmental Design (M.A., also part-time)
- Civil and Environmental Engineering including Civil Engineering (B.Sc. and M.Sc. Sustainable Planning and Building), Environmental Engineering (B.Sc.), and Sustainable Energy & Environmental Systems (M.Eng.) Several study programmes are also available in dual formats.

=== Faculty 3: School of Social Sciences ===
This faculty offers 7 Bachelor's and 4 Master's programmes in areas such as:

- Social Work
- Midwifery, Nursing & Health
- Tourism and Leisure Studies
- Political Science & Sustainability Management

Four Bachelor's programmes are dual or comparable in structure.

=== Faculty 4: School of Electrical Engineering and Computer Science ===
It offers 10 Bachelor's and 3 Master's programmes. Most Bachelor's programmes are available in dual or international formats (including a stay abroad). Teaching areas include:

- Electrical Engineering & Applied Physics
- Automation & Mechatronics
- Energy Technology & Microsystems
- Computer Science (e.g. Media Computer Science)
- Space Engineering

The International Women's Programme in Computer Science (B.Sc., also dual) is existing for more than 25 years.

=== Faculty 5: School of Nature and Engineering ===
Comprising 20 programmes (14 Bachelor's, 1 dual; 6 Master's), this faculty focuses on:

- Mechanical and Energy Engineering
- Maritime Engineering (Shipbuilding and Offshore Engineering)
- Nautical Sciences
- Aerospace Engineering
- Biology and Biomimetics

In 2024, the Hochschule Bremen celebrated 225 years of nautical education in Bremen.

== See also ==
- List of colleges and universities
- Bremen (state)

== Sources ==
- Hochschule Bremen, Studienführer- Studienjahr 2008/2009, 29. Aufl., Verlag E. Knoblauch
