= German Apsara Conservation Project =

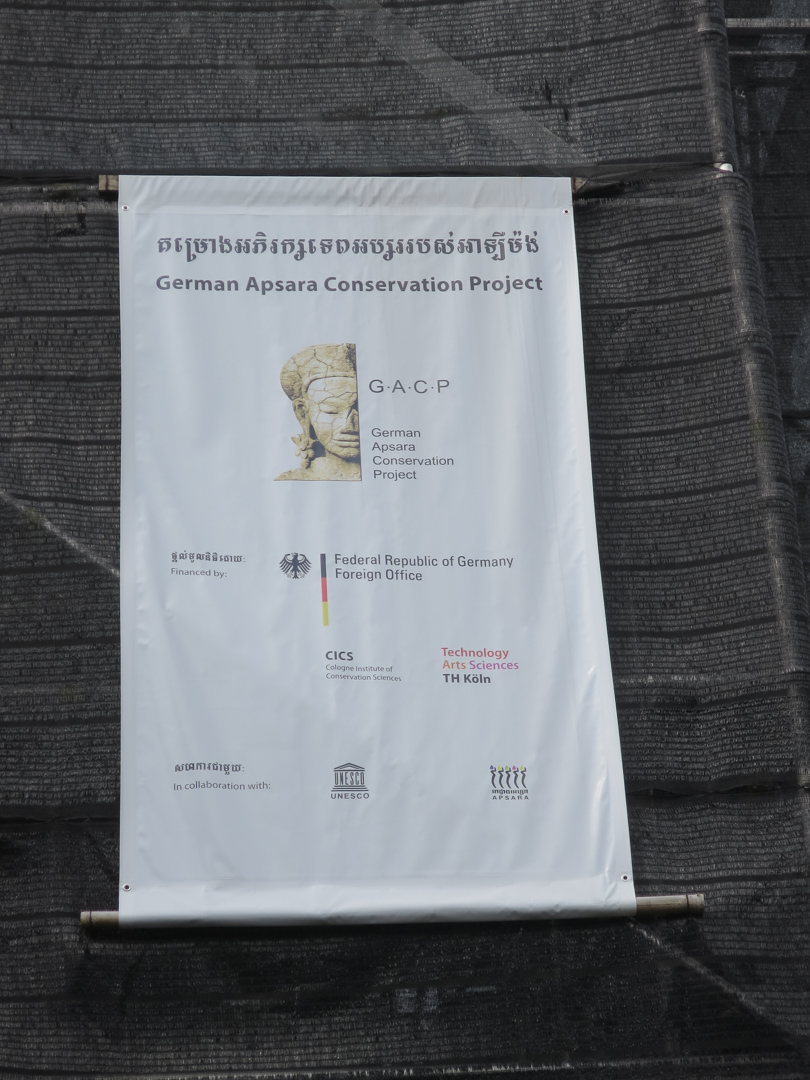
Banner of the German Apsara Conservation Project at Angkor Wat

The German Apsara Conservation Project (GACP) is a non-profit organisation based at the University of Applied Sciences, Cologne dedicated to preserving the devatas (or apsaras) and other bas-reliefs of Angkor Wat. It is funded primarily by the German Foreign Office.

Angkor Wat is the principal monument of the Angkor World Heritage Site in Cambodia which was registered in the World Heritage List in 1992. Despite its condition it is currently not inscribed on the List of World Heritage in Danger. On a national level it is under the administration of the / APSARA Authority and the G.A.C.P. (German Apsara Conservation Project) works in collaboration with both UNESCO and APSARA Authority towards the conservation of this unique monument.

== Reliefs of Angkor Wat ==
Angkor Wat is generally considered to be the largest religious stone monument in the world and much of the surface of this extraordinary temple is decorated with carvings in bas-relief of battle scenes, of triumphant processions, of religious scenes and of single or groups of female figures. Nearly 1,850 of these female figures, popularly known as Apsaras, adorn the surface of Angkor Wat and some of them are in an extremely alarming state of decay. Several of the reliefs have already fallen victim to the ravages of time.

Natural stones weather in different ways. Scientific investigations have been under way since 1995 to examine the characteristic properties of the sandstone and the factors causing damage. The conservators are being supported by photographers and experts from the fields of geology, geomicrobiology and chemistry. The detailed investigations have confirmed that, in the case of some 360 of the Apsaras, the damage is so serious that significant quantities of carved stone surface could become detached at any time. The project chose to focus on the Apsaras since they are the most exposed and therefore endangered of the precious carvings at Angkor Wat.

Since 1997 the work of conservation is being performed by students and lecturers of the Department of Restoration and Conservation of the Fachhochschule Köln (University of Applied Sciences, Cologne) and by local Conservation d’Angkor personnel in collaboration with the APSARA Authority. The first urgent measure performed was a reversible step to secure the endangered relief areas. A team from Fachhochschule Köln (University of Applied Sciences Cologne) has set itself the goal of reducing the erosion of the Apsaras. Conservation work is now being carried out using material with properties similar to those of the original stone. Ultimately, it will not be possible to completely stop the damage to the reliefs, which means that regular and sound maintenance of the monument is the most effective conservation measure.

One of the most important activities of the German Apsara Conservation Project (GACP) is education and training of qualified staff for the future conservation of Angkor. Students of restoration and conservation at the University of Applied Sciences Cologne join the project either to make their diploma thesis on subjects significant for the conservation of the reliefs or to pass the “practice semester” that is a part of their education. Meanwhile, the GACP co-operates closely with the Royal University of Fine Arts in Phnom Penh, Faculty of Archaeology, Architecture and Urbanism and Plastic Arts. The students from Phnom Penh participate in courses of stone conservation and some of them have written their diploma theses with the joint supervision of the Royal University of Fine Arts and the GACP consultants. The GACP experts have also trained the team of Cambodian conservators working at the temple throughout the year. In the year 2000 new trainees for stone conservation will be recruited by the GACP.

There are a multitude of temples within the Angkor region and consequently there are many international groups working in the field of restoration and conservation. This community of international projects makes up the world’s biggest preservation project co-ordinated by UNESCO. Exchange of experiences, transfer of technology, consultation and collaboration with the national and international institutions present is therefore an important aim of the GACP.

When the University of Applied Sciences Cologne began to assess and evaluate the situation at Angkor in 1995, with a view of preparing a conservation project, it was immediately clear that the documentation of the surfaces and subsequently of the intervention would have to be approached in an exceptional way.
