= Cologne University of Applied Sciences =

Higher education institution in Cologne, Germany

Coordinates: 50.9347°N 6.98778°E

- TH Köln
- Former name: FH Köln (Fachhochschule Köln)
- Motto: University of Technology, Arts, Sciences
- Type: Public
- Established: 1 August 1971
- Affiliations: UAS7, EUA
- Budget: € 218 million
- President: Sylvia Heuchemer
- Academic staff: 440 professors
- Administrative staff: 2,000
- Location: Cologne, Gummersbach and Leverkusen, North Rhine-Westphalia, Germany
- Campus: Urban, 3 campuses
- Website: www.th-koeln.de

Cologne University of Applied Sciences, officially called TH Köln – University of Applied Sciences (German: Technische Hochschule Köln, abbreviated TH Köln) is an institute of higher education located in Cologne, Germany, established in 1971.

It was created from a merger of numerous smaller colleges, the oldest of which was the Royal Provincial Trade School, founded in 1833, and renamed Trade College of the City of Cologne on 15 December 1879.

TH Köln is the largest University of Applied Sciences in Germany by number of students, having about 21,000 students and 440 professors and headquartered in Cologne Südstadt. The TH Köln offers a total of 100 bachelor's and master's degrees.

The other big universities of Cologne are the University of Cologne and the German Sport University Cologne.

== History ==
Cologne University of Applied Sciences, officially known as TH Köln – University of Applied Sciences (Technische Hochschule Köln), was established on 1 August 1971 through the amalgamation of several predecessor institutions. These included the Cologne Crafts Schools, the State Engineering Schools for Mechanical and Construction Engineering, the Cologne College of Higher Education for Business, the German Insurance Academy, the Cologne State College of Higher Education for Photography, the Cologne College of Higher Education for Social Work, the Gummersbach Campus, and the College of Higher Education for Librarianship and Documentation. Additionally, new departments such as Restoration and Conservation, Design, and the Institute for Technology and Resources Management in the Tropics and Subtropics were introduced.

On 1 September 2015, the university adopted the name TH Köln – University of Applied Sciences, reflecting its focus on technology, arts, and sciences.

== Faculties ==
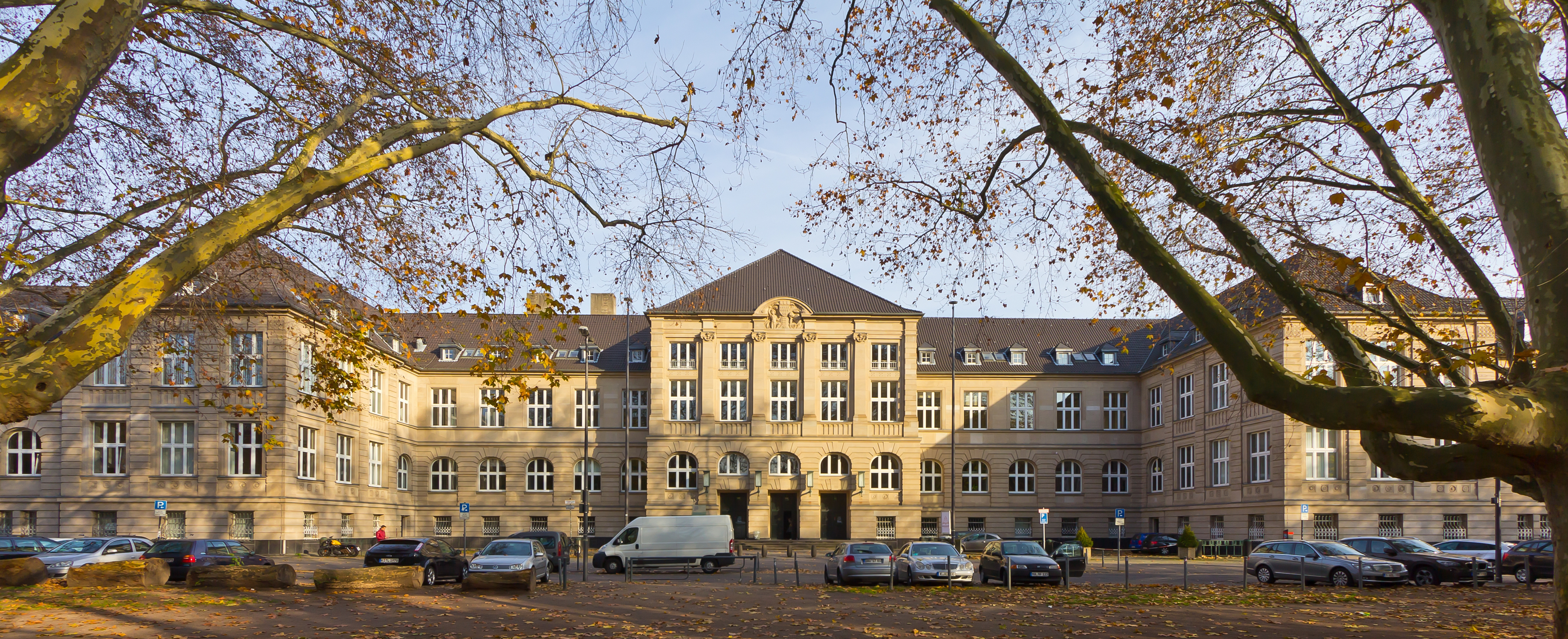

- Faculty of Applied Social Sciences (F01)
- Faculty of Cultural Sciences (F02)
- Faculty of Information Science and Communication Studies (F03)
- Faculty of Business, Economics and Law (F04)
- Faculty of Architecture (F05)
- Faculty of Civil Engineering and Environmental Technology (F06)
- Faculty of Information, Media and Electrical Engineering (F07)
- Faculty of Automotive Systems and Production (F08)
- Faculty of Process Engineering, Energy and Mechanical Systems (F09)
- Faculty of Computer Science and Engineering Science (F10)
- Faculty of Applied Natural Sciences (F11)
- Faculty of Spatial Development and Infrastructure Systems (F12)
- Institute for Technology and Resources Management in the Tropics and Subtropics
- Köln International School of Design

== Locations ==
TH Köln has campuses in Cologne at Südstadt for faculties related to humanities, Deutz for faculties related to engineering, and Mülheim for the Cologne Game Lab. It also operates two campuses in Gummersbach for computer science and Leverkusen for chemistry.

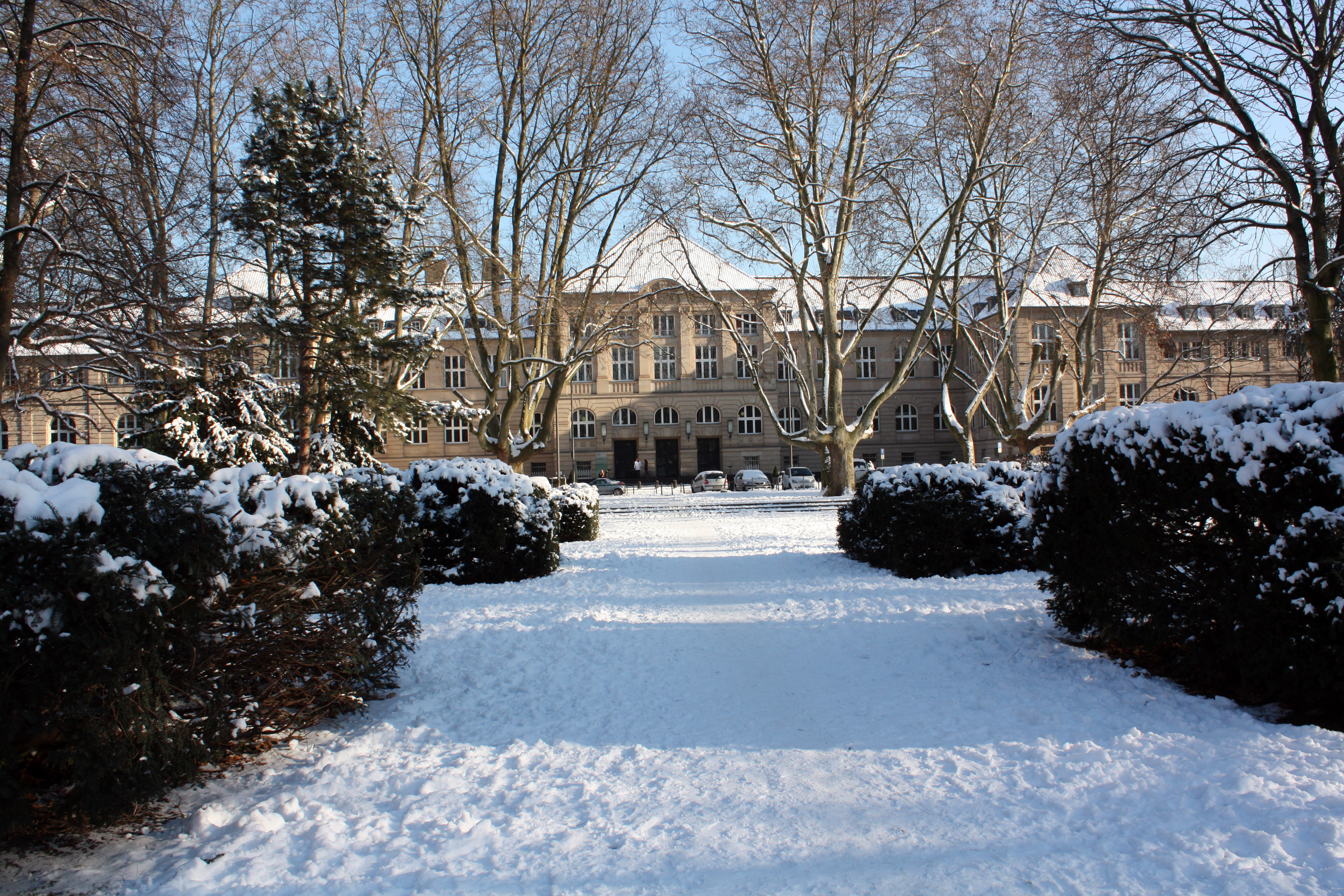
Campus Südstadt in winter, from Römerpark

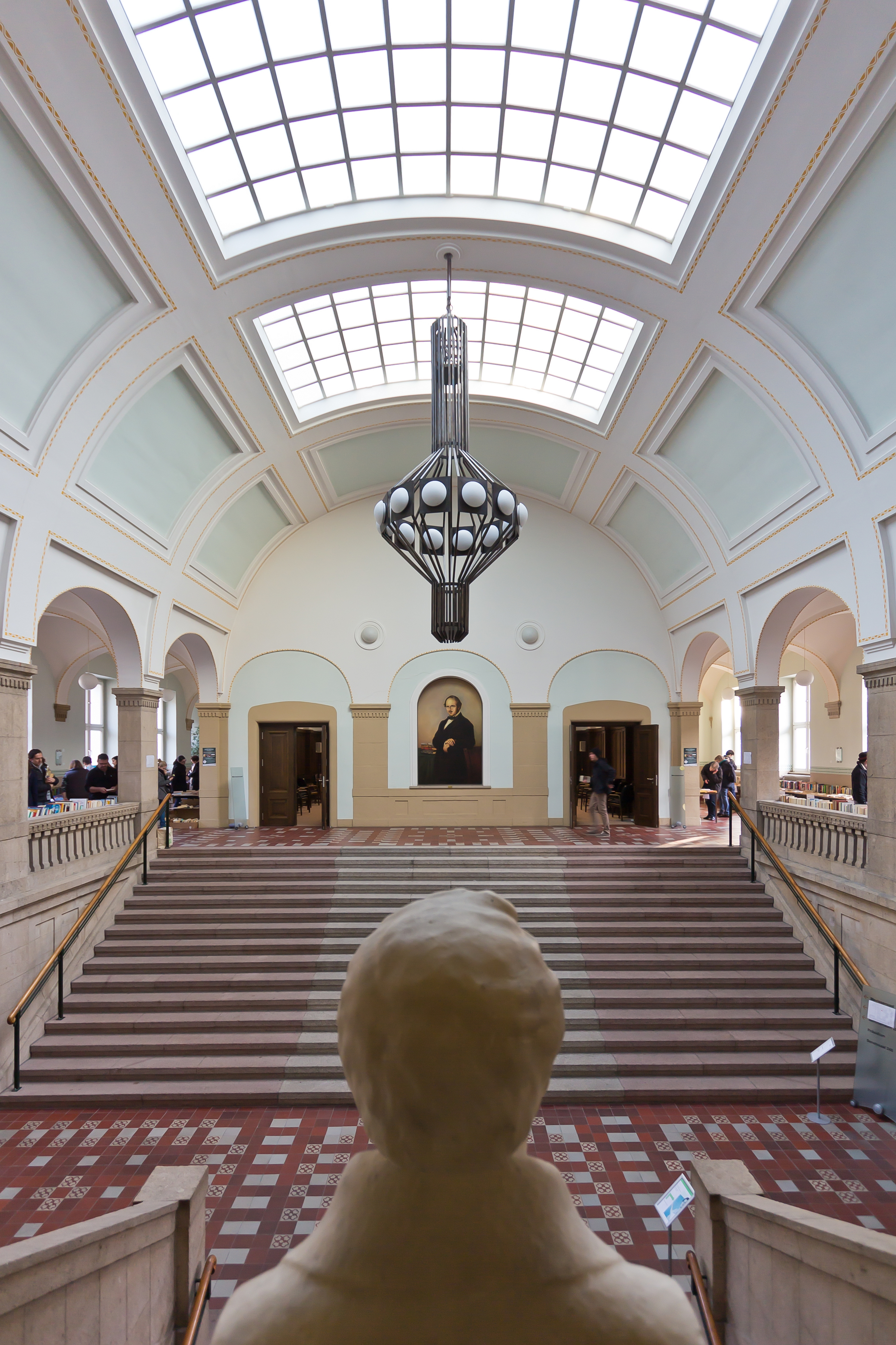
Campus Südstadt stairwell

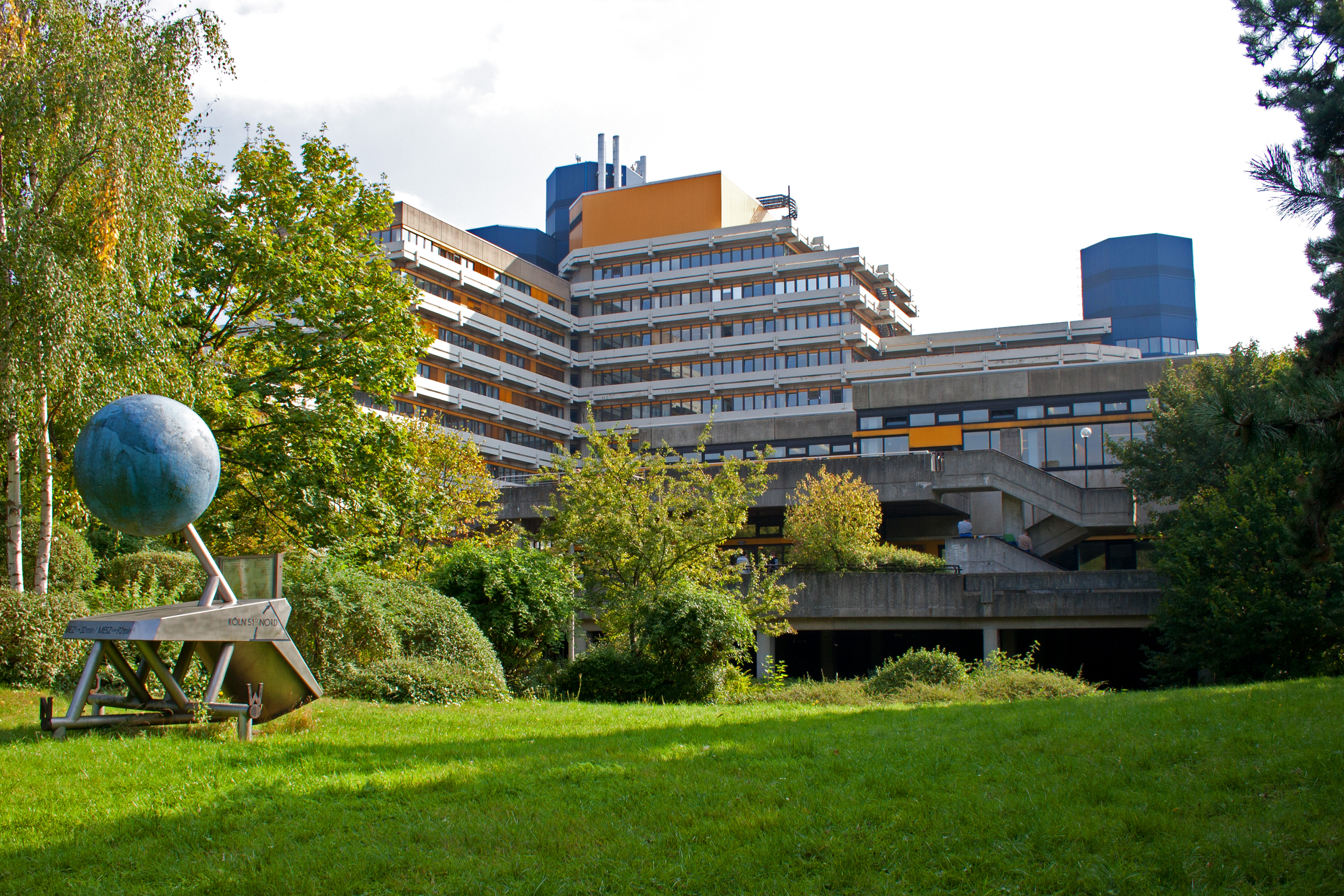
Campus Deutz

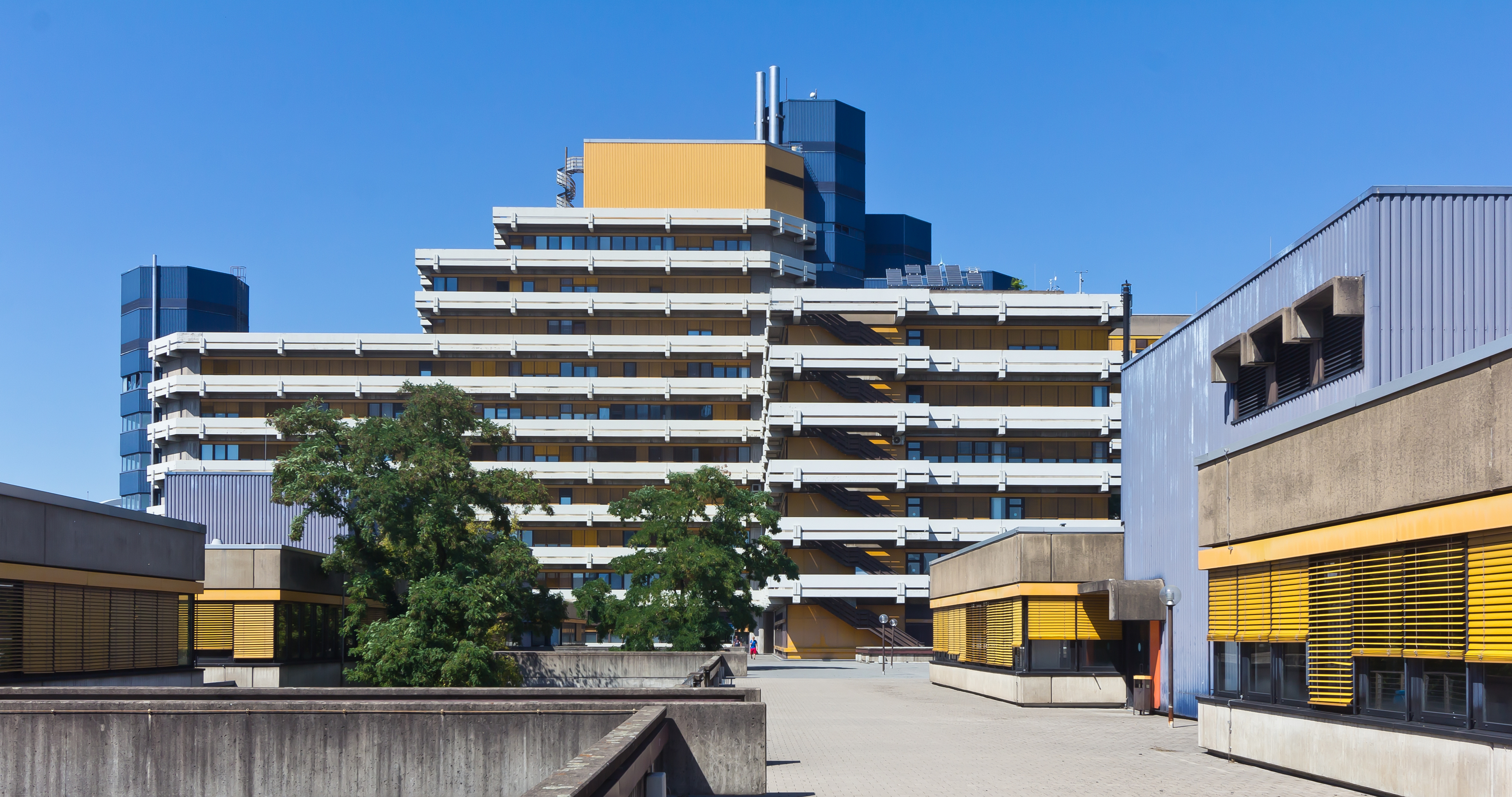
Campus Deutz

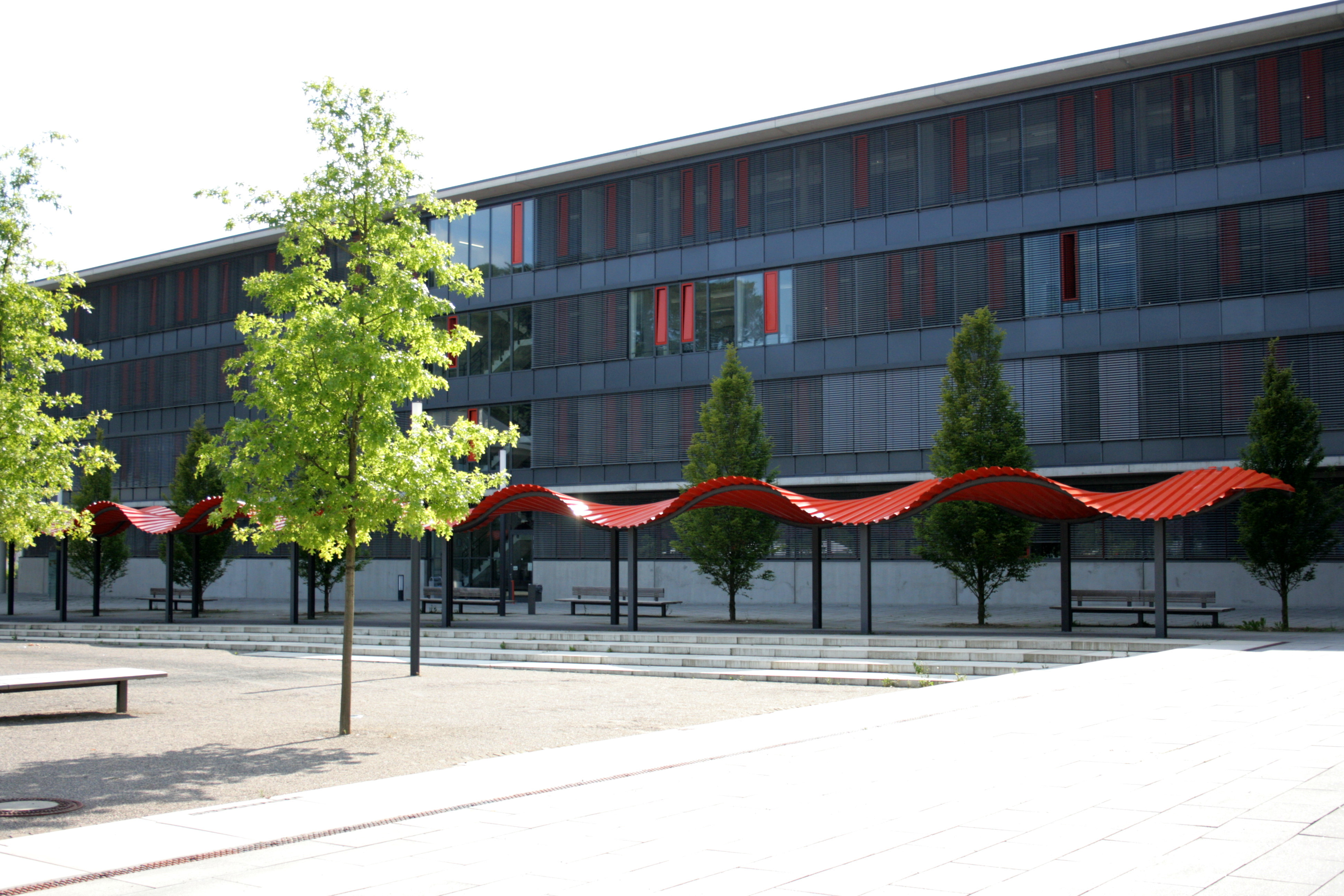
Campus Gummersbach

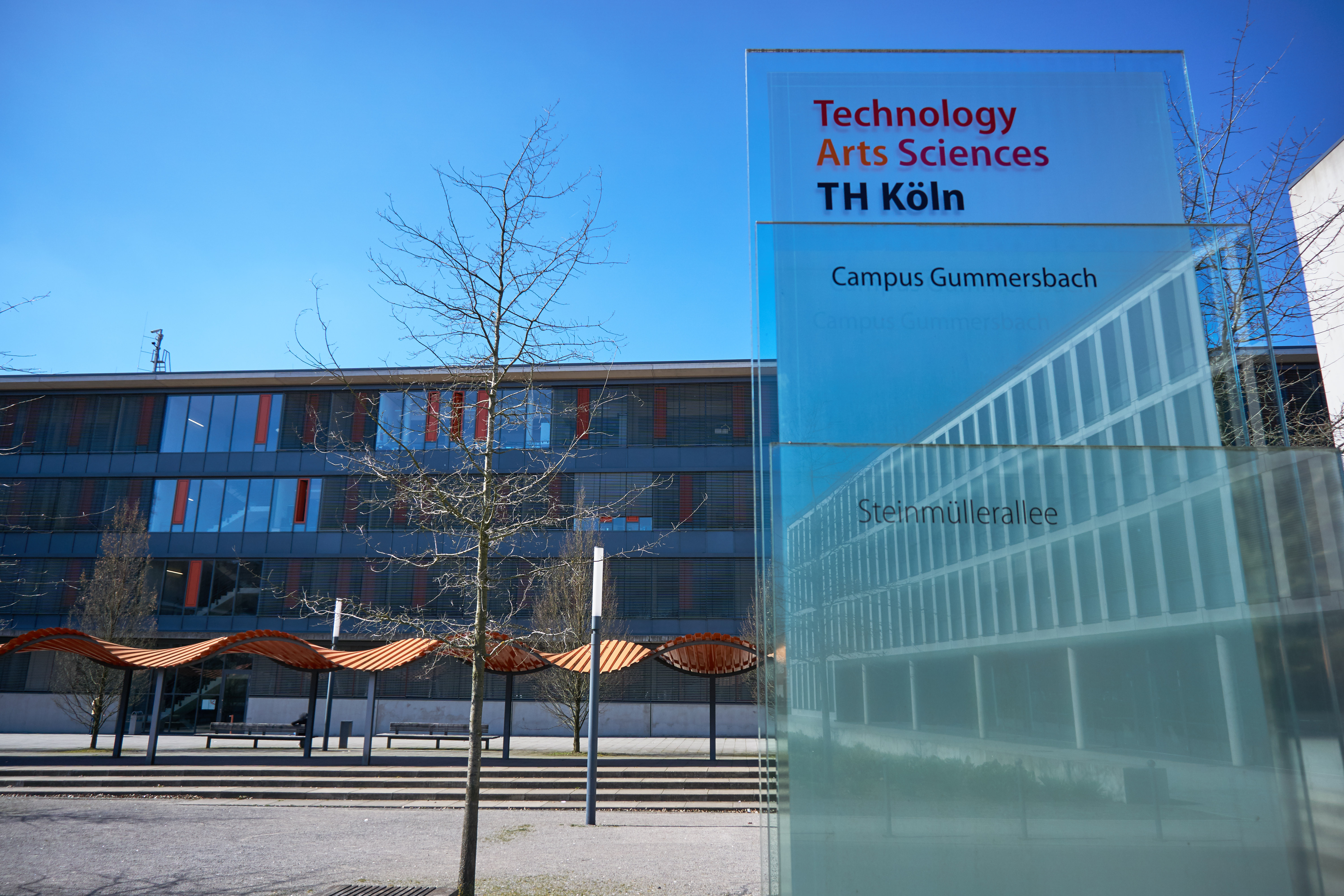
Campus Gummersbach

== Study ==
TH Köln – University of Applied Sciences offers bachelor's and master's degrees across several disciplines. Programs are available in full-time, part-time, and dual study formats.

=== Academic Disciplines ===
Academic instruction at TH Köln is organized into the following subject areas:

- Applied Natural Sciences
- Architecture and Civil Engineering
- Computer Science
- Information and Communication
- Engineering
- Culture and Society
- Social Sciences
- Business Studies

The programs are assigned to twelve faculties, each responsible for specific academic fields.

=== Language of Instruction ===
Most degree programs are conducted in German. Fourteen programs are taught in English, including:

- 3D Animation for Film & Games (M.A.)
- Automation & IT (M.Eng.)
- Communication Systems and Networks (M.Sc.)
- Digital Games (B.A. and M.A.)
- Digital Narratives (M.A.)
- Game Development and Research (Master)
- Digital Sciences (M.Sc.)
- International Business and Global Transformation (Master)
- International Design Research (Master)
- Renewable Energy Management (M.Sc.)
- Serial Storytelling (M.A.)
- Water Resources Management (Master)
- Natural Resources Management (Master)

=== Program Structure ===
All study programs at TH Köln follow a modular structure and are aligned with the Bologna Process. Degree requirements include coursework, examinations, and, in some programs, a mandatory internship or applied project.

== International ==
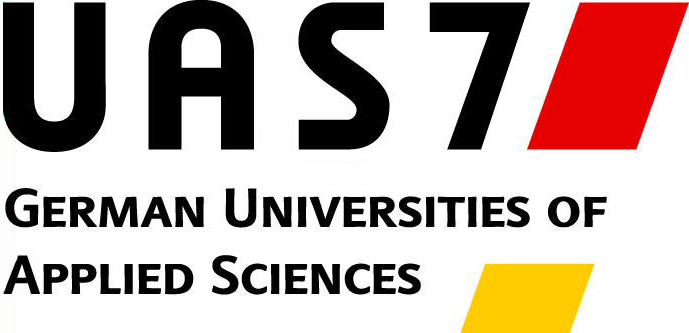

The Department of International Affairs at the TH Köln offers student exchange opportunities with more than 340 partner universities in 94 countries. The TH Köln is also one of seven members of UAS7, which represent the seven leading German universities of applied sciences internationally.

== See also ==
- German Apsara Conservation Project
