= Kurt Deketelaere =

Belgian academic

Kurt Deketelaere (born 29 July 1966 in Torhout) is a Belgian academic. Since 2009 he has been the Secretary-General of the League of European Research Universities (LERU). He is a professor of law in environmental law at the KU Leuven.
