= Barker, West Virginia =

Unincorporated community in West Virginia, United States

Barker
- Unincorporated community
- Location within the state of West Virginia Barker (the United States)
- Coordinates: 39°34′46″N 80°39′37″W
- Country: United States
- State: West Virginia
- County: Wetzel
- Elevation: 735 ft (224 m)
- Time zone: UTC-5 (Eastern (EST))
  - Summer (DST): UTC-4 (EDT)
- GNIS ID: 1535219

Barker is an unincorporated community in Wetzel County, West Virginia, United States. It was also known as Mohr.
