= Barker Building =

- U.S. National Register of Historic Places
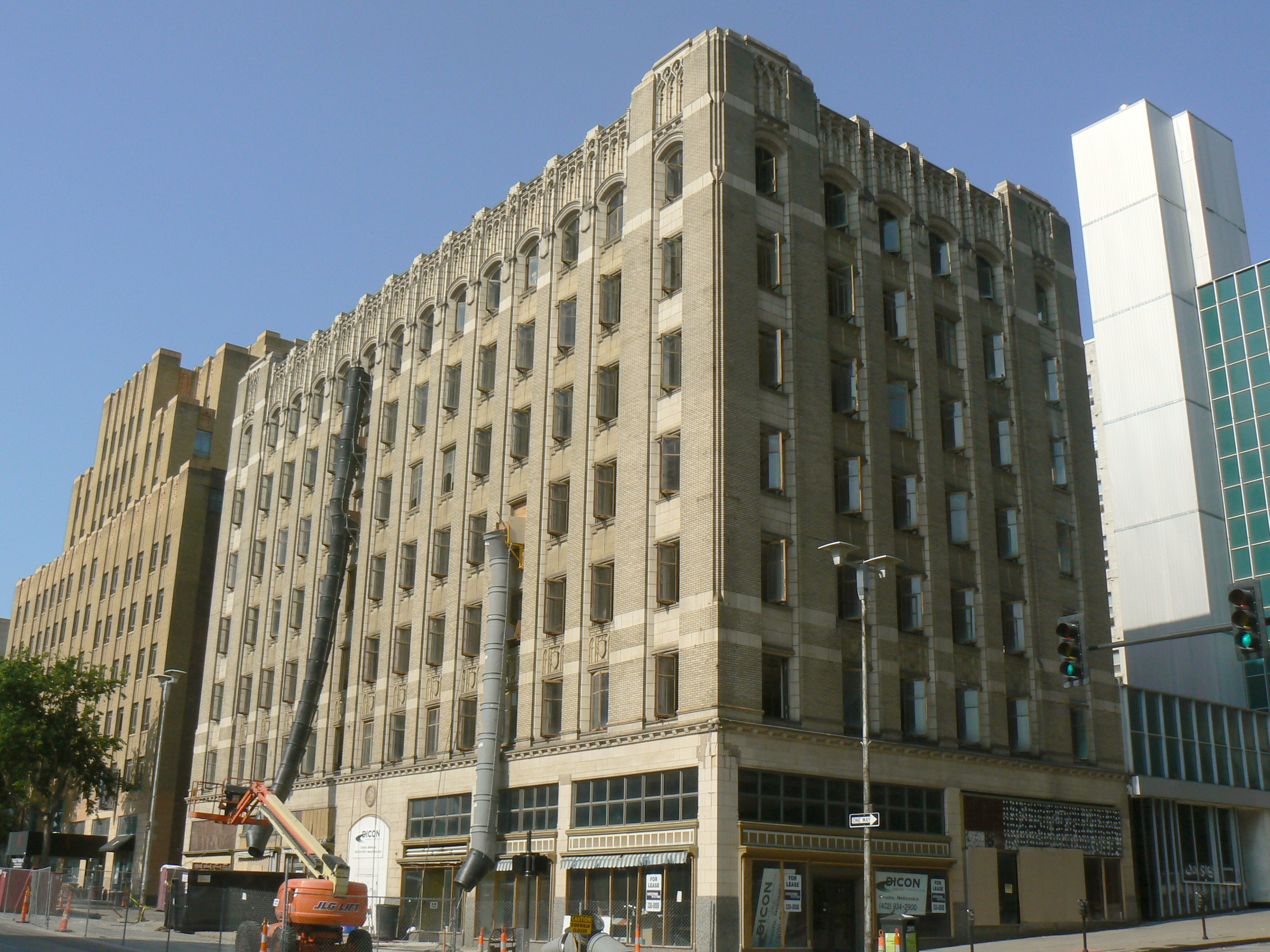
- Barker Building undergoing renovation, July 2012

- Location within Nebraska Location within the United States
- Location: Omaha, Nebraska
- Coordinates: 41.257275°N 95.936048°W
- Built: 1929
- Architect: Allan and Wallace
- Architectural style: Neo-Gothic Revival style
- NRHP reference No.: 08000605
- Added to NRHP: July 2, 2008

The Barker Building, a seven-story apartment building located at 306 South 15th Street in Downtown Omaha, Nebraska, United States. Built in 1929, it was listed on the National Register of Historic Places on July 2, 2008. The sons of prominent, early Omaha minister Joseph Barker named this building in honor of their father. Architectural firm Allan and Wallace, local masters, provided the design for this building. An example of the Neo-Gothic Revival style, the building was constructed by contractor Kiewit Construction with characteristics of the Traditional Modernism period. After 70 years and numerous owners, the Barker Building was boarded up in 1999. In 2012, an 8.8 million dollar remodeling project was begun to convert the structure into a 48-unit apartment building.

== See also ==
- History of Omaha
