= Hamburg University of Applied Sciences =

Higher education and applied research institution in Hamburg

Coordinates: 53°33′23″N 10°01′19″E

- Hochschule für Angewandte Wissenschaften Hamburg
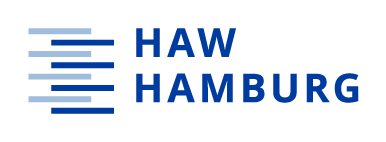
- Type: Public university
- Established: 1970
- President: Prof. Dr. Ute Lohrentz
- Students: 16,454
- Location: Hamburg, Germany
- Campus: Multiple campuses
- Address: HAW Hamburg, Berliner Tor 5, 20099 Hamburg, Germany
- Website: https://www.haw-hamburg.de/en

The Hamburg University of Applied Sciences (German: Hochschule für Angewandte Wissenschaften Hamburg) is a higher education and applied research institution located in Hamburg, Germany. Formerly known as Fachhochschule Hamburg, the Hamburg University of Applied Sciences was founded in 1970. In terms of student enrolment, the HAW is the second-largest university in Hamburg and the fourth-largest applied sciences university in Germany, with a student body of 16.454.

== History ==
The Hamburg University of Applied Sciences was founded in 1970 as the Fachhochschule Hamburg. Four engineering schools and six vocational schools were brought together with the goal of developing a new form of higher education. The focus was on the application of knowledge, with degree programmes that included placements in industry, laboratory work and practice-related projects.

The Fachhochschule Hamburg initially had 13 departments. Its Business School was founded in 1994.

In 1998, as part of the increased internationalisation within higher education in Germany, the Conference of the Ministers of Education and Cultural Affairs allowed the Fachhochschulen to add 'university of applied sciences' to their names. In 2001, the Fachhochschule Hamburg decided to take this a step further and changed its German name to Hochschule für Angewandte Wissenschaften Hamburg (HAW Hamburg), which more closely reflected the English name, Hamburg University of Applied Sciences.

All of the Bachelor's programmes offered at the university are taught in German, with the exception of Information Engineering, which offers both English and German options.

At the end of 2007, the Faculty of Business and Public Management and the Faculty of Social Work and Nursing were joined to form one faculty. Today the university has four faculties at four different campus locations in Hamburg:

- Engineering and Computer Science
- Life Sciences
- Design, Media and Information
- Business and Social Sciences

As of 1 January 2006, the Architecture, Civil Engineering and Geomatics departments joined the building faculties of two other Hamburg universities to become the new HafenCity University.

== Faculties ==
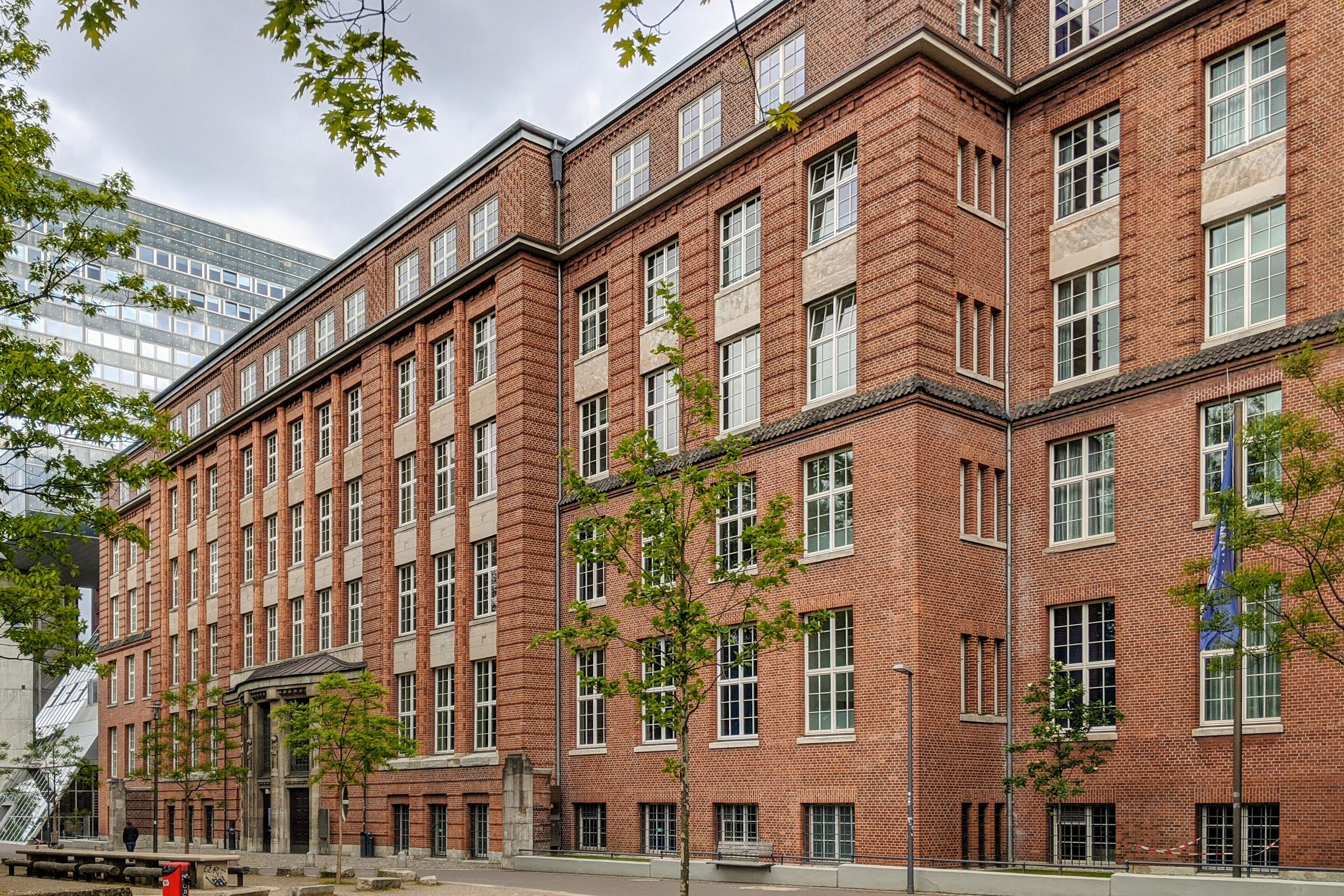
Hochschule für Angewandte Wissenschaften Hamburg, Campus Berliner Tor

- Business and Social Sciences [Berliner Tor Campus]
- Design, Media and Information [Armgartstrasse/Finkenau Campus]
- Engineering and Computer Science [Berliner Tor Campus]
- Life Sciences [Bergedorf Campus]

== Research ==
- Energy and Sustainability
  - Biomass
  - Environmental Analysis and Ecotoxicology
  - Fuel Cells
  - Lifetec Process Engineering
- Health and Nutrition
  - Biomedical Systems/Networks in Diagnostics
  - Evaluation Research in Social, Health and Education Sectors
  - Food Science
  - Public Health
- Mobility and Transport
  - New Flight
  - AERO - Aircraft, Design, and Systems Group
  - Driver Assistance and Autonomous Systems (FAUST)
  - Application of Dynamic Systems (ADYS)
- IT, Communication and Media
  - Ambient Intelligence
  - iNET - Internet Technologies Research Group
  - Interactive Multimedia Systems
  - Knowledge Access and Accessibility
  - Information and the Development of the Internet
  - MARS - Multi-Agent Research and Simulation
  - Sound Analysis and Design
  - Visual Thinking
  - Games
- Diverse Research Activities
  - Dynamics and Interactions of Fluid and Structures (DISS)
  - Optical Sensing and Image Processing
  - Innovation in Medium Sized Companies
  - Family Relationships/Children at Risk
  - Integrated Industrial Business Processes

== Partnerships ==
HAW Hamburg has partnerships with various other universities, including the University of Shanghai for Science and Technology (China), the University of Huelva (Spain) and the Institute of Technology Tallaght in Dublin (Ireland). A 'joint college' collaboration between HAW Hamburg and the University of Shanghai for Science and Technology offers Mechanical Engineering and Electrical Engineering degree courses to Chinese students. A third of the courses take place at the University of Shanghai campus.

HAW Hamburg partners with California State University – Long Beach (CSULB) every fall and summer for a short-term study abroad programme. German students host CSULB students in the summer and are hosted in the fall in return.

HAW Hamburg also partners with the Department of Aerospace and Ocean Engineering at Virginia Tech.

HAW is a member of the UAS7 (Seven Universities of Applied Sciences) network that forms a strategic alliance of seven leading German Universities of Applied Sciences in teaching and research.

== Campuses ==
The HAW has four campuses. The main campus and official address is in St. Georg; the Bergedorf Campus is in Lohbrügge.

== See also ==
- Education in Hamburg
