= Association of East Asian Research Universities =

East Asian organization for research universities

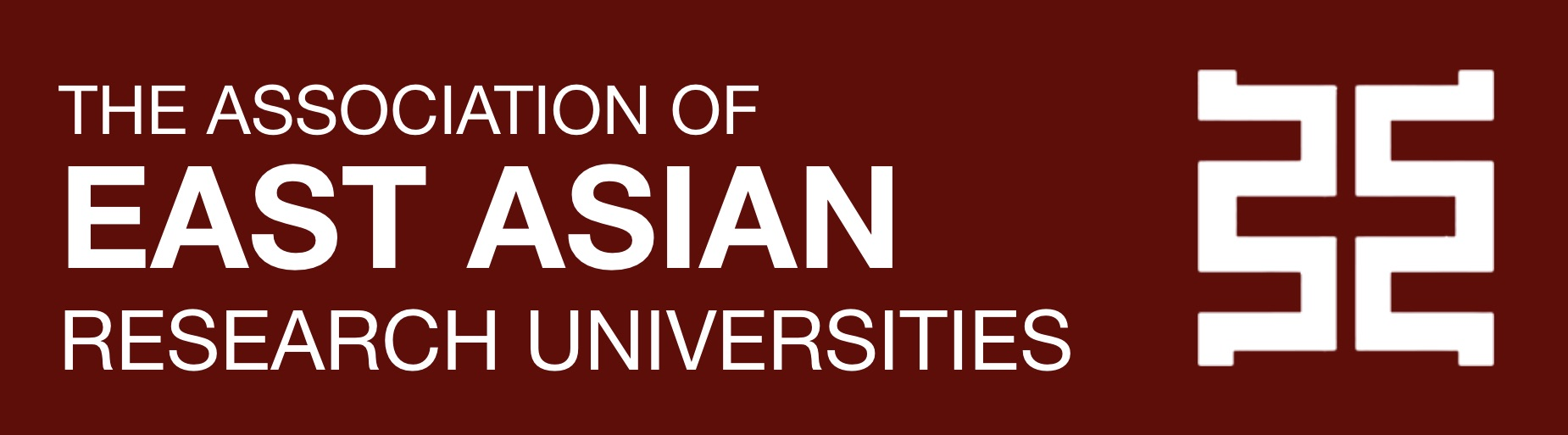
- Formation: January 1996; 30 years ago
- Headquarters: University of Science and Technology of China (USTC), Hefei, Anhui, China (Note: The organisation's headquarters, and correspondingly the chairperson, rotate among the member universities every two years. Therefore, the names listed are for the current period 2022–2023.)
- Region served: East Asia
- Members: 19
- President: Bao Xinhe (USTC)
- Website: www.aearu.com

Association of East Asian Research Universities

Chinese name
- Simplified Chinese: 东亚研究型大学协会
- Traditional Chinese: 東亞研究型大學協會
Transcriptions
Standard Mandarin
- Hanyu Pinyin: Dōngyà yánjiū xíng Dàxué xiéhuì
Yue: Cantonese
- Yale Romanization: Dūng a yìhn gau yìhng daaih hohk hip wuih
- Jyutping: Dung^{1} aa^{3} jin^{4} gau^{3} jing^{4} daai^{6} hok^{6} hip^{3} wui^{6*2}

Korean name
- Hangul: 동아시아 연구형 대학 협회
- Hanja: 東아시아研究型大學協會

Japanese name
- Kanji: 東アジア研究型大学協会
- Kana: ひがしアジアけんきゅうがただいがくきょうかい

The Association of East Asian Research Universities (AEARU) is an East Asian organisation comprising 19 research universities. It was established in January 1996 at the suggestion of Hong Kong University of Science and Technology. The purpose of the organisation is to promote regional exchange and cooperation among member institutions, and to open a forum where leading East Asian universities may share research results.

== Member universities ==
AEARU Members
Country/Region	Universities	Abbreviations
Mainland China	Fudan University	Fudan
Mainland China	Nanjing University	Nanjing
Mainland China	Peking University	PKU/Peking
Mainland China	Tsinghua University	Tsinghua/THU
Mainland China	University of Science and Technology of China	USTC
Hong Kong	Hong Kong University of Science and Technology	HKUST
Macau	University of Macau	Macau
Taiwan	National Taiwan University	NTU/Taiwan
Taiwan	National Tsing Hua University	Tsing Hua
Taiwan	National Yang Ming Chiao Tung University	NYCU
Japan	Institute of Science Tokyo	Science Tokyo
Japan	Tohoku University	Tohoku
Japan	University of Osaka	UOsaka
Japan	University of Tokyo	UTokyo
Japan	University of Tsukuba	Tsukuba
South Korea	Korea Advanced Institute of Science and Technology	KAIST
South Korea	Pohang University of Science and Technology	POSTECH
South Korea	Seoul National University	Seoul/SNU
South Korea	Yonsei University	Yonsei

== See also ==
- List of higher education associations and alliances
- League of European Research Universities
