= RU11 =

RU11 (Research University 11, Japanese: 学術研究懇談会) is a consortium consisting of eleven top research universities in Japan. Established in November 2009, this consortium is actively committed in the international academic community. RU11 is made up of 9 national and 2 private universities.

== Members ==
National universities

- Hokkaido University
- Institute of Science Tokyo
- Tohoku University
- University of Osaka
- University of Tsukuba
- University of Tokyo
- Nagoya University
- Kyoto University
- Kyushu University

Private universities

- Keio University
- Waseda University

== Missions ==
Briefly, their two missions are as follows:

- Discuss measures for enhancement in order to strengthen research universities.
- Improve cooperation between the research universities and pooling of information.
