= League of European Research Universities =

Educational consortium

- Formation: 2002; 24 years ago
- Type: Education and research
- Headquarters: Leuven, Belgium
- Region served: Europe
- Members: 24
- Secretary-General: Kurt Deketelaere
- Website: www.leru.org

The League of European Research Universities (LERU) is a consortium of leading European research universities, headquartered in Leuven, Belgium.

== History and overview ==
The League of European Research Universities (LERU) is an association of research-intensive universities, founded in 2002 as a partnership among twelve multi-faculty research universities. In 2024 the number of its members expanded to 24, as the latest addition, ETH Zurich joined the alliance on 1 January 2024. The purpose of the League is to influence academic policies in Europe and to develop best practice through mutual exchange of experience. LERU regularly publishes a variety of papers and reports which make high-level policy statements, provide analyses and make recommendations for policymakers, universities, researchers and other stakeholders.

LERU is headquartered in Leuven, Belgium. Kurt Deketelaere is the current Secretary-General. Linda Doyle is the current chair.

== Membership ==
The Karolinska Institutet in Sweden, one of the 12 founding members of the LERU, voluntarily left the group in March 2011. The 24 member universities as of 2026 are:

LERU Members
Country	Universities
Belgium	KU Leuven^{[1]}
Denmark	University of Copenhagen^{[6]}
Finland	University of Helsinki^{[2]}^{[4]}
France	Sorbonne University^{[3]}
France	Paris-Saclay University^{[3]}
France	University of Strasbourg^{[4]}
Germany	University of Freiburg^{[3]}
Germany	Heidelberg University^{[1]}
Germany	LMU Munich
Ireland	Trinity College Dublin^{[1]}^{[6]}
Italy	University of Milan
Netherlands	University of Amsterdam^{[3]}
Netherlands	Leiden University^{[1]}^{[2]}
Netherlands	Utrecht University^{[3]}^{[4]}
Spain	University of Barcelona^{[5]}^{[1]}
Sweden	Lund University^{[3]}
Switzerland	University of Geneva^{[1]}
Switzerland	ETH Zurich
Switzerland	University of Zurich^{[3]}
United Kingdom	Imperial College London^{[5]}
United Kingdom	University College London^{[3]}
United Kingdom	University of Cambridge^{[1]}
United Kingdom	University of Edinburgh^{[1]}
United Kingdom	University of Oxford^{[1]}^{[2]}

== Locations ==
Locations of the LERU members

== See also ==
- List of higher education associations and alliances
- Association of East Asian Research Universities

== Notes ==
1. ^{a} ^{b} ^{c} ^{d} ^{e} ^{f} ^{g} These universities also belong to the Coimbra Group, a larger alliance of European universities.
2. ^{a} ^{b} ^{c} These universities also belong to Europaeum, another European university network.
3. ^{a} ^{b} ^{c} ^{d} ^{e} ^{f} These universities joined the League as new members on 1 January 2006.
4. ^{a} ^{b} ^{c} These universities also belong to the Utrecht Network, another European university network.
5. ^{a} ^{b} These universities joined the League as new members on 1 January 2010.
6. ^{a} These universities joined the League as new members on 1 January 2017.
