= UAS7 =

Alliance of seven leading German Universities of Applied Sciences

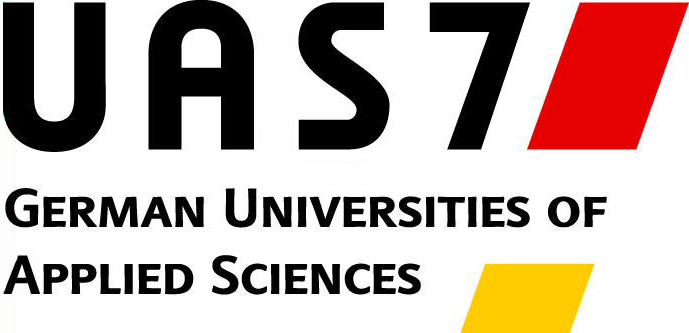
Logo

UAS7 is a strategic alliance of seven leading German Universities of Applied Sciences (UAS), with representations in Berlin, Germany, New York, US and São Leopoldo, Brazil. The seven constitutive members are the Berlin School of Economics and Law, Bremen City University of Applied Sciences, Hamburg University of Applied Sciences, TH Köln - University of Applied Sciences, Munich University of Applied Sciences, FH Münster - University of Applied Sciences and Osnabrück University of Applied Sciences. Together, they have a total of 115,000 students, 2,300 professors, 15,000 international students and almost 1,200 bilateral university partners around the world.

== Universities of Applied Sciences ==
Universities of Applied Sciences (UAS) were established in the early 1970s to help German industries maintain their international competitiveness. With their new approach they put higher education on a solid academic footing based on practice-oriented education and -increasingly- applied research.

Universities of applied sciences differ from other universities by preparing students through application-oriented and interdisciplinary instruction. Although research is becoming increasingly important to UAS, teaching and practical experiences in non-academic settings are very important parts of the education. Their objective is to enable graduates to apply systematic theoretical and rigorously methods-based knowledge to resolve practical problems flexibly. This enables UAS graduates to integrate quickly into the business environment after graduation and thus provides them with a strong competitive edge for their future careers.

== UAS7 New York, Inc. ==
The UAS7 Liaison Office New York represents the seven universities in North America. UAS7 New York Inc. was founded in 2005 and became a tax-exempt nonprofit organization under section 501(c)(3) of the United States tax code in 2017. The New York office is supported through contributions by the UAS7 member universities and independent fundraising activities.

== Programs ==
UAS7 offers a broad range of exchange, study & internship opportunities for U.S. and Canadian college and university students as well as for students at Brazilian partner universities.

International students from around the world are welcome to apply as degree-seeking students or participate in a summer program.

Students from within the UAS7 network in Germany have the unique opportunity to study or intern at one of our U.S. partner universities.

== UAS7 Members ==
- Berlin School of Economics and Law (Hochschule für Wirtschaft und Recht Berlin)
- Bremen City University of Applied Sciences (Hochschule Bremen)
- Hamburg University of Applied Sciences (HAW Hamburg)
- TH Köln - University of Applied Sciences (Technische Hochschule Köln)
- FH Münster - University of Applied Sciences (FH Münster)
- Munich University of Applied Sciences (Hochschule München)
- Osnabrück University of Applied Sciences (Hochschule Osnabrück)
