= C21H31NO3 =

The molecular formula C_{21}H_{31}NO_{3} (molar mass: 345.47 g/mol, exact mass: 345.2304 u) may refer to:

- Samandaridine
- Spirendolol
