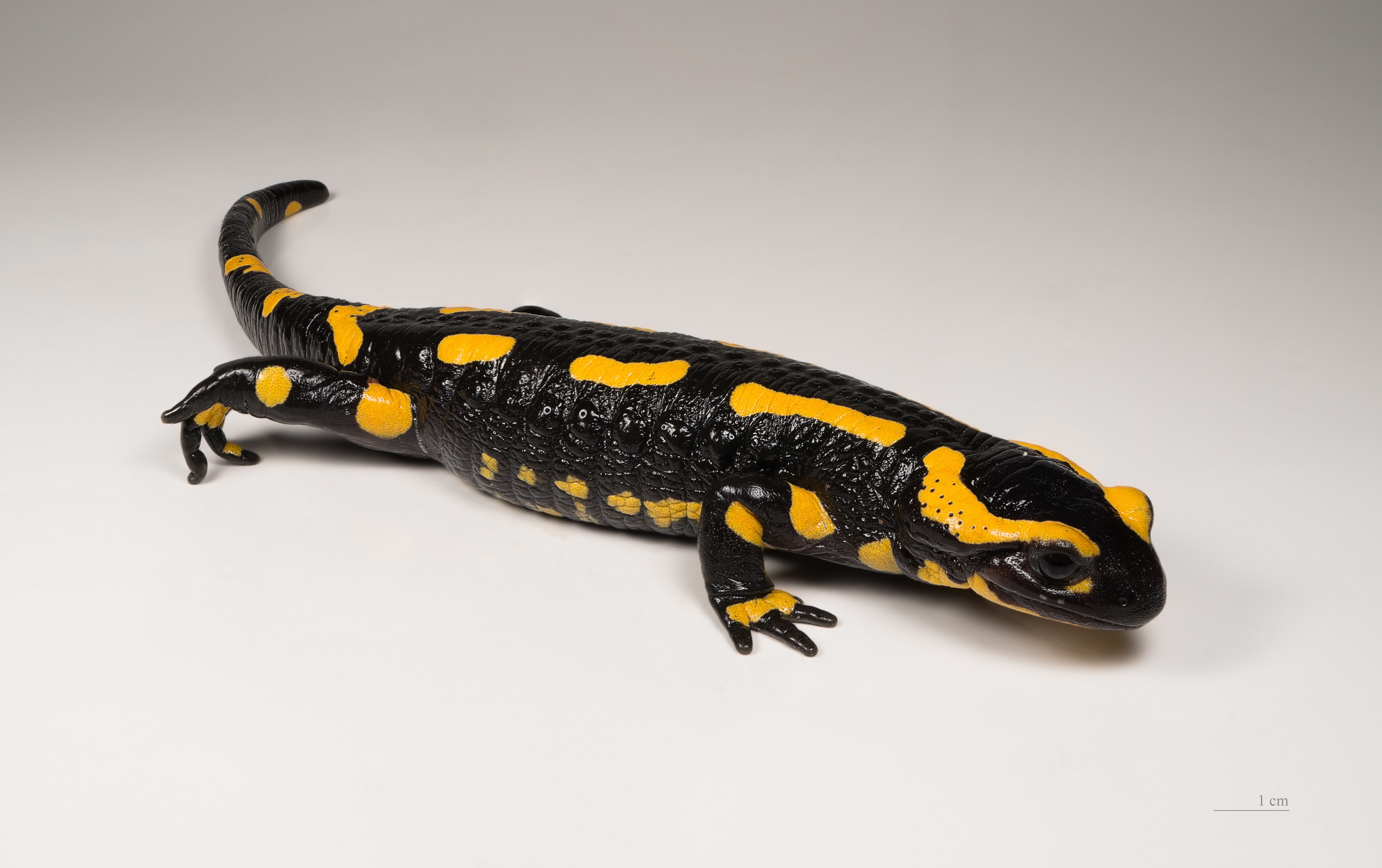

Conservation status
- Vulnerable (IUCN 3.1)

Scientific classification
- Kingdom: Animalia
- Phylum: Chordata
- Class: Amphibia
- Order: Urodela
- Family: Salamandridae
- Genus: Salamandra
- Species: S. salamandra

Binomial name
- Salamandra salamandra (Linnaeus, 1758)
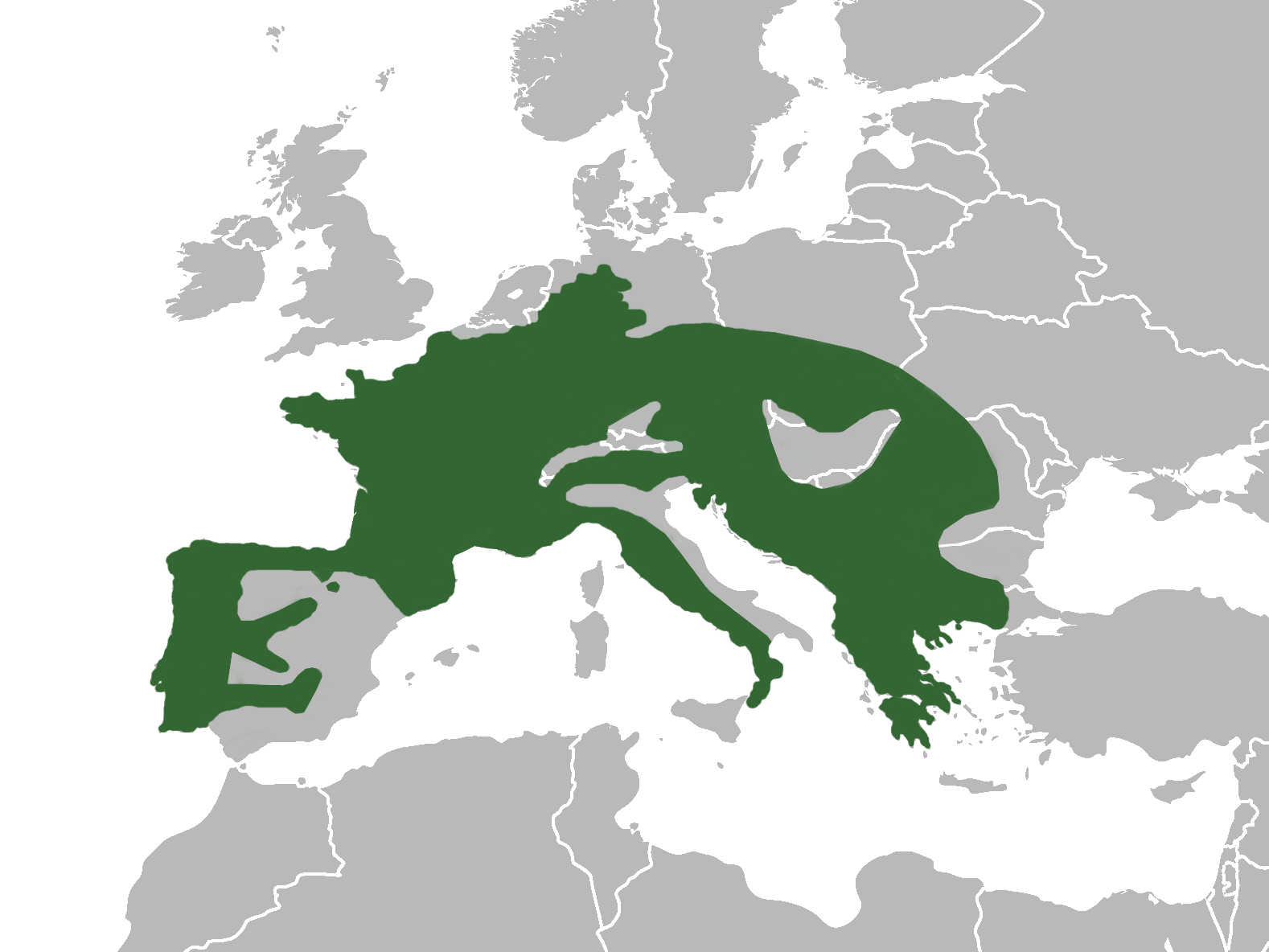
- Distribution of fire salamander

Synonyms
- Lacerta salamandra Linnaeus, 1758; Salamandra candida Laurenti, 1768; Salamandra maculosa Laurenti, 1768; Salamandra terrestris Houttuyn, 1782; Gecko salamandra Meyer, 1795; Triton vulgaris Rafinesque, 1814; Salamandra maculata Merrem, 1820; Salamandra vulgaris Cloquet, 1827; Triton corthyphorus Leydig, 1867; Salamandra maculosa Boulenger, 1882; Salamandra moncheriana Schreiber, 1912; Salamandra maculata Schreiber, 1912

= Fire salamander =

Species of amphibian

The fire salamander (Salamandra salamandra) is a common species of salamander found in Europe.

It is black with yellow spots or stripes to a varying degree; some specimens can be nearly completely black while on others the yellow is dominant. Shades of red and orange may sometimes appear, either replacing or mixing with the yellow according to subspecies. This bright coloration is highly conspicuous and acts to deter predators by honest signalling of its toxicity (aposematism). Fire salamanders can have a very long lifespan; one specimen lived for more than 50 years in Museum Koenig, a German natural history museum.

Despite its wide distribution and abundance, it is classified as Vulnerable on the IUCN Red List due to its susceptibility to infection by the introduced fungus Batrachochytrium salamandrivorans, which has caused severe declines in fire salamanders in parts of its range.

== Taxonomy ==
Several subspecies of the fire salamander are recognized. Most notable are the subspecies fastuosa and bernadezi, which are the only viviparous subspecies – the others are ovoviviparous.

- S. s. alfredschmidti
- S. s. almanzoris
- S. s. bejarae
- S. s. bernardezi
- S. s. beschkovi
- S. s. crespoi
- S. s. fastuosa (or bonalli) – yellow-striped fire salamander
- S. s. gallaica – Galician fire salamander
- S. s. gigliolii
- S. s. morenica
- S. s. salamandra – spotted fire salamander, nominate subspecies
- S. s. terrestris – barred fire salamander
- S. s. werneri

Some former subspecies have been lately recognized as species for genetic reasons.

- S. algira Bedriaga, 1883 – African fire salamander
- S. corsica Savi, 1838 – Corsican fire salamander
- S. infraimmaculata Martens, 1885 – Near Eastern fire salamander (arouss al ayn)

== Distribution ==
Video of a fire salamander in its natural habitat in Austria

Fire salamanders are found in most of southern and central Europe. They are most commonly found at altitudes between 250 metres (820 ft) and 1,000 metres (3,300 ft), only rarely below (in Northern Germany sporadically down to 25 metres (82 ft)). However, in the Balkans or Spain they are commonly found in higher altitudes as well.

== Habitat, behavior and diet ==
Fire salamanders live in the forests of central Europe and are more common in hilly areas. They prefer deciduous forests since they like to hide in fallen leaves and around mossy tree trunks. They need small brooks or ponds with clean water in their habitat for the development of the larvae. Whether on land or in water, fire salamanders are inconspicuous. They spend much of their time hidden under wood or other objects. They are active in the evening and the night, but on rainy days they are active in the daytime as well.

The diet of the fire salamander consists of various insects, spiders, millipedes, centipedes, earthworms and slugs, but they also occasionally eat newts and young frogs. In captivity, they eat crickets, mealworms, waxworms and silkworm larvae. Small prey will be caught within the range of the vomerine teeth or by the posterior half of the tongue, to which the prey adheres. It weighs about 40 grams. Compared to other salamanders in the region like Luschan's salamander, the fire salamander has been shown to be larger and appears to have a more solid pectoral girdle. Additionally, it has a longer pectoral girdle than Luschan's salamander. The fire salamander is one of Europe's largest salamanders and can grow to be 15–25 centimetres (5.9–9.8 in) long.

== Reproduction ==
Males and females look very similar, except during the breeding season, when the most conspicuous difference is a swollen gland around the male's vent. This gland produces the spermatophore, which carries a sperm packet at its tip. The courtship happens on land. After the male becomes aware of a potential mate, he confronts her and blocks her path. The male rubs her with his chin to express his interest in mating, then crawls beneath her and grasps her front limbs with his own in amplexus. He deposits a spermatophore on the ground, then attempts to lower the female's cloaca into contact with it. If successful, the female draws the sperm packet in and her eggs are fertilized internally. The eggs develop internally and the female deposits the larvae into a body of water just as they hatch. In some subspecies, the larvae continue to develop within the female until she gives birth to fully formed metamorphs. Breeding has not been observed in neotenic fire salamanders.

In captivity, females may retain sperm long-term and use the stored sperm later to produce another clutch. This behavior has not been observed in the wild, likely due to the ability to obtain fresh sperm and the degradation of stored sperm.

== Toxicity ==
Samandarin structure

The fire salamander's primary alkaloid toxin, samandarin, causes strong muscle convulsions and hypertension combined with hyperventilation in all vertebrates. Through an analysis of the European fire salamander's skin secretions, scientists have determined that another alkaloid, such as samandarone, is also released by the salamander. These steroids can be swabbed from the salamander's parotid glands. Samandarine was often the dominant alkaloid present but the ratio varied between salamanders. This ratio, however, was not shown to be sex dependent. Larvae do not produce these alkaloids. Upon maturity, ovaries, livers, and testes appear to produce these defensive steroids. The poison glands of the fire salamander are concentrated in certain areas of the body, especially around the head and the dorsal skin surface. The coloured portions of the animal's skin usually coincide with these glands. Compounds in the skin secretions may be effective against bacterial and fungal infections of the epidermis; some are potentially dangerous to human life.

== Environmental stressors and threats ==
=== Batrachochytrium salamandrivorans ===
In parts of its range, the fire salamander has become highly endangered by the spread of the introduced chytrid fungus Batrachochytrium salamandrivorans, which has had catastrophic effects on its population. This collapse was first identified from the Netherlands in 2013. The fire salamander in the Netherlands is teetering on the brink of extinction, confined to three small populations in the southern part of the country. Prior to these declines, they were already listed as "Endangered" on the national Red List, and their range had reduced by 57% since 1950, mainly due to changes in water availability and habitat degradation. The remaining populations were limited to specific areas of deciduous forests on hillsides, and their surface activity is restricted to humid periods with night temperatures above 5°C.The species had been considered stable until 2008 when dead individuals were observed, and since 2010, there has been a staggering 96% population decline, with the largest population dropping from 241 individuals to only four in 2011. In 2013, the cause of the decline was officially identified as a new chytrid fungus, Batrachochytrium salamandrivorans (Bsal), likely introduced to Europe from east Asia via captive amphibians.

Since its identification in the Netherlands, Bsal has continued to spread across western Europe, and has infected more populations of S. s. terrestris in Belgium and western Germany, with an isolated but contained occurrence in Spain affecting a population of S. s. hispanica. Dramatic declines have been noted in all affected populations, and some may eventually be entirely extirpated, although at most known sites, fire salamanders persist at low numbers even after disease outbreak, and in one case appear to have recovered. Some localities in the Eifel Mountains where fire salamanders were previously known from appear to now be devoid of fire salamanders, suggesting landscape-scale declines that occurred prior to the disease's identification by science. In 2023, the fire salamander was officially moved from 'Least Concern' to 'Vulnerable' on the IUCN Red List, relating to the past and predicted future declines in the species.

== Gallery ==
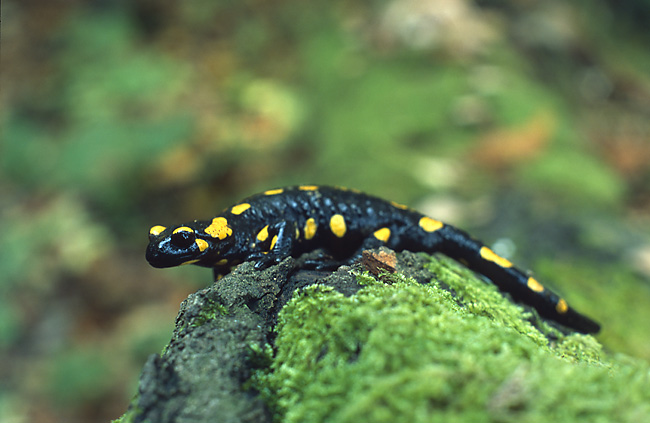

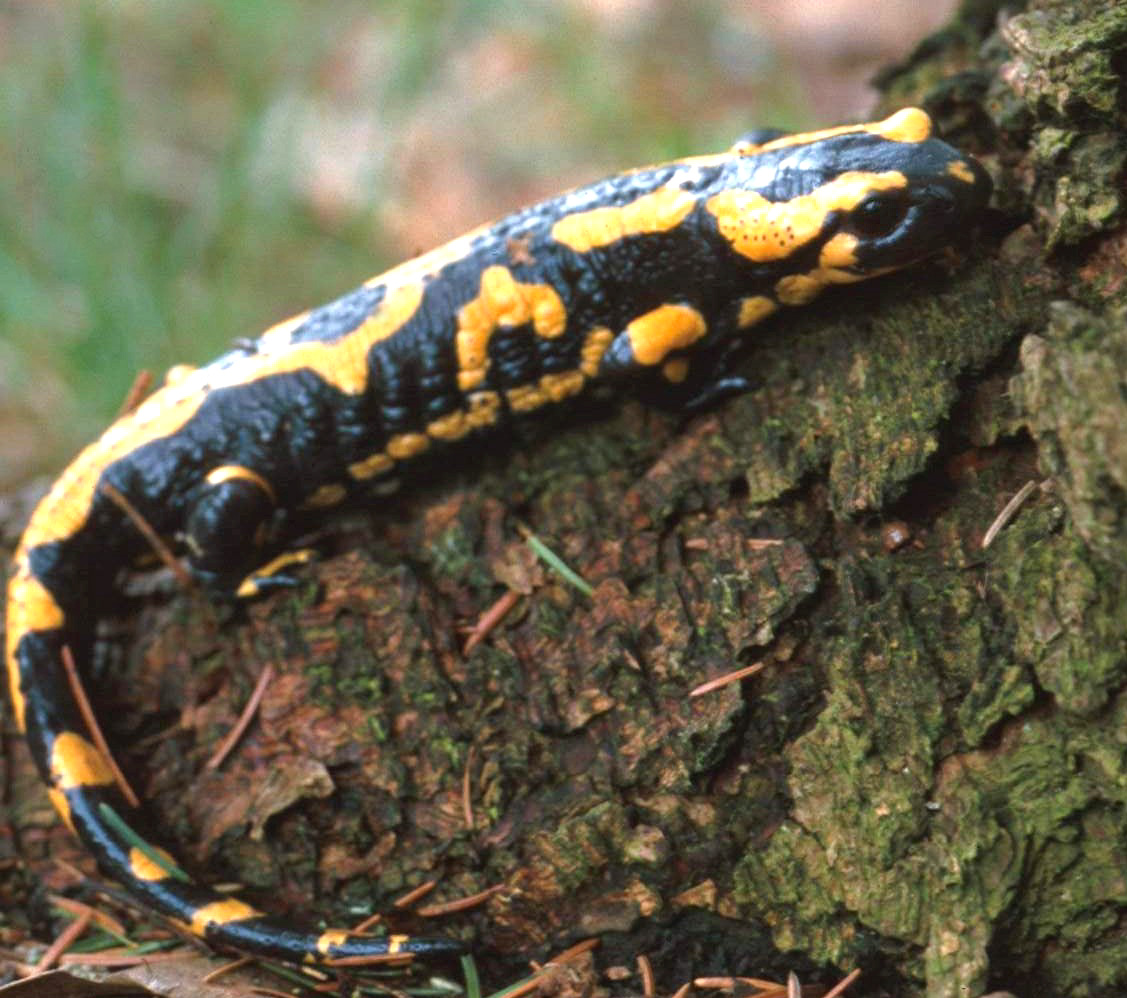

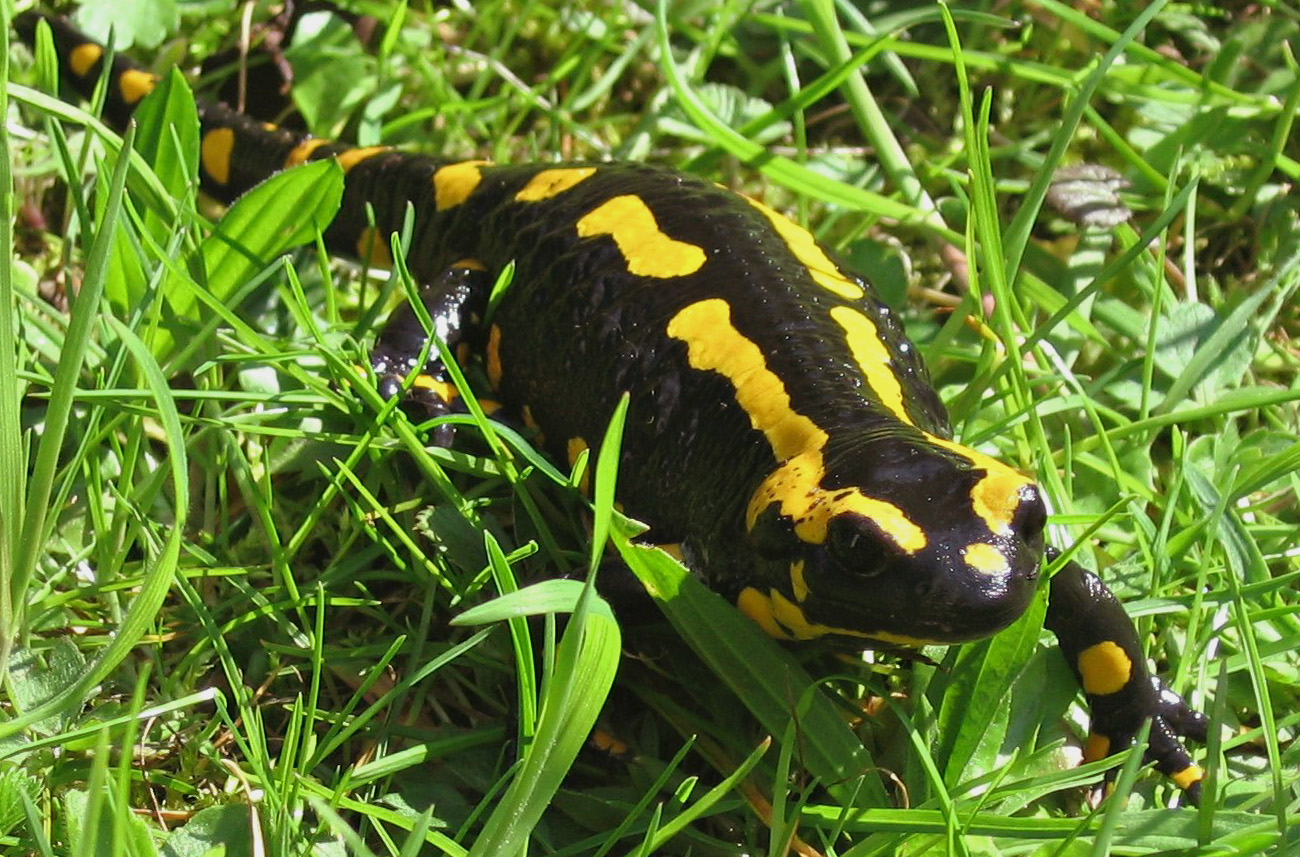

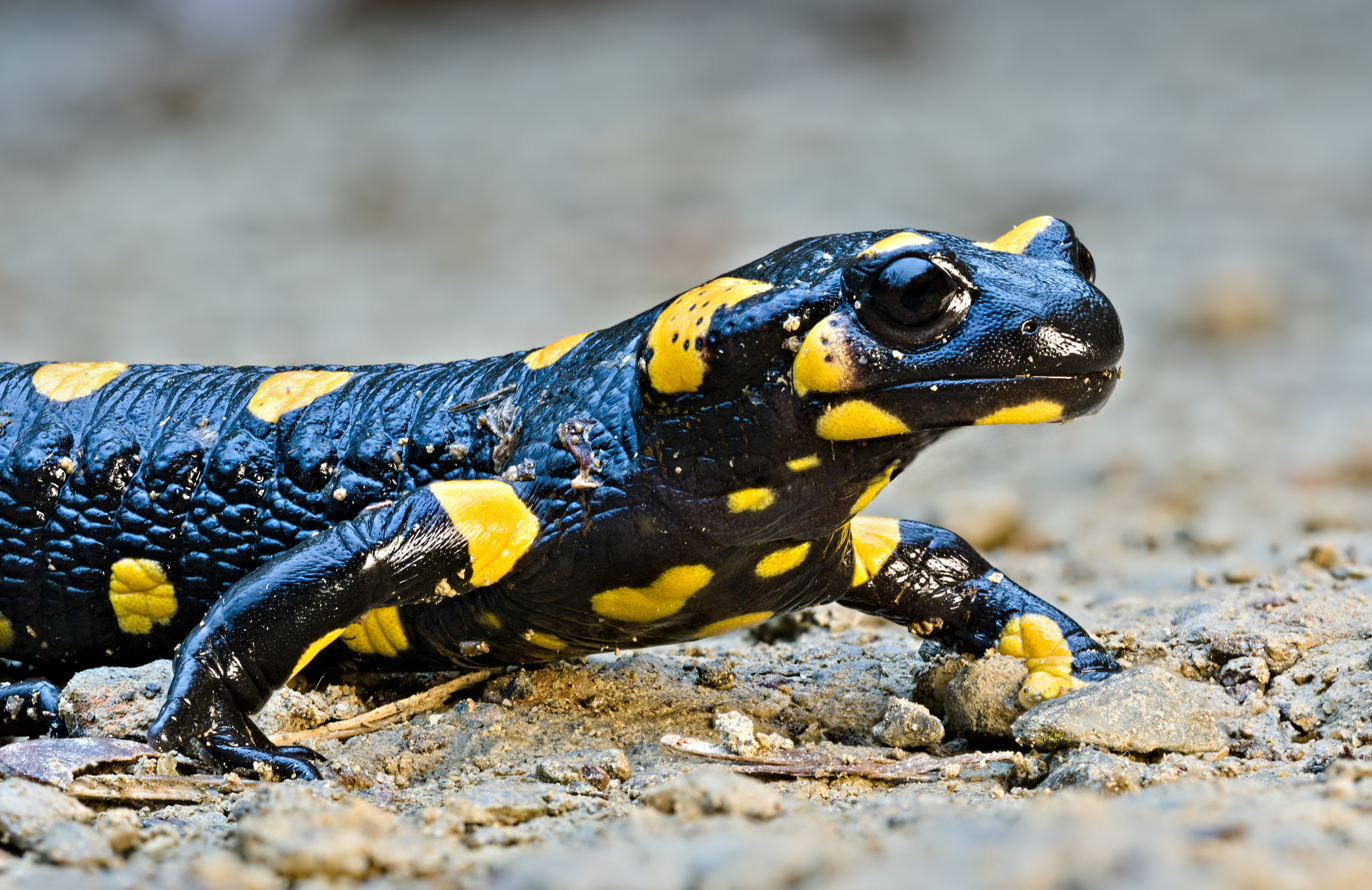

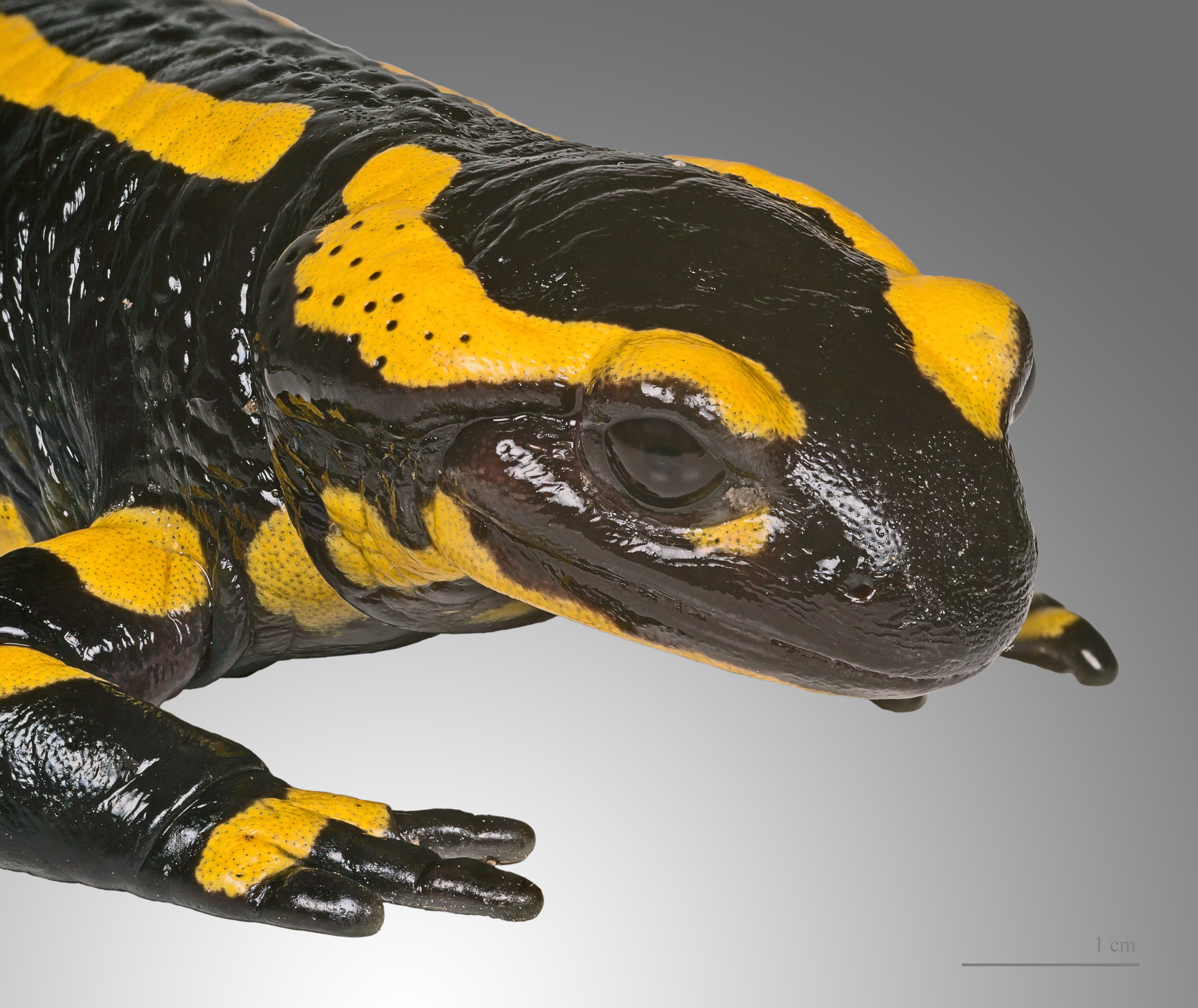

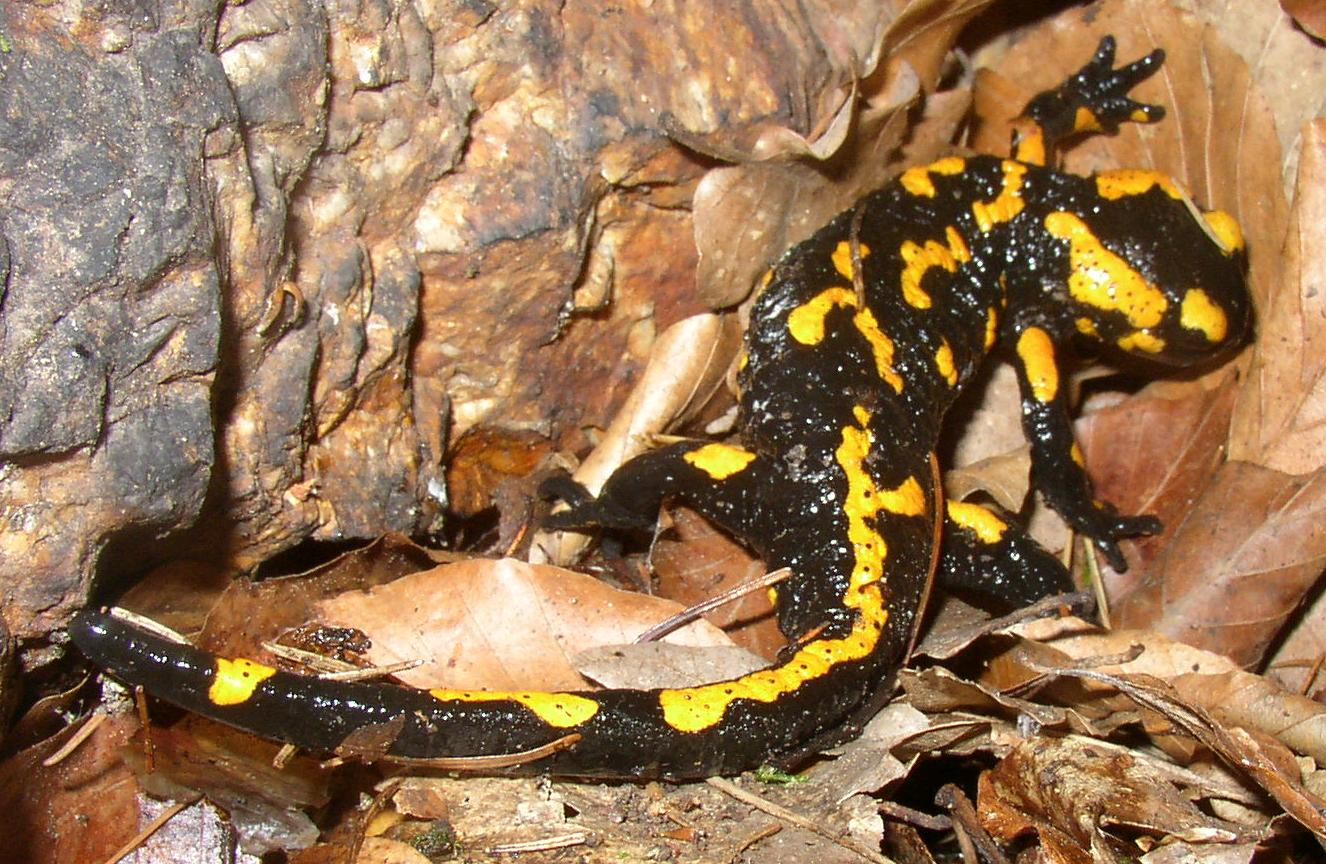

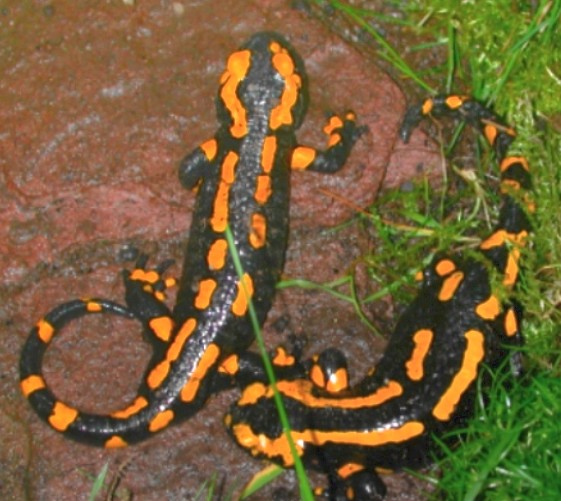
Orange morph
