= Otto le Roi =

German zoologist

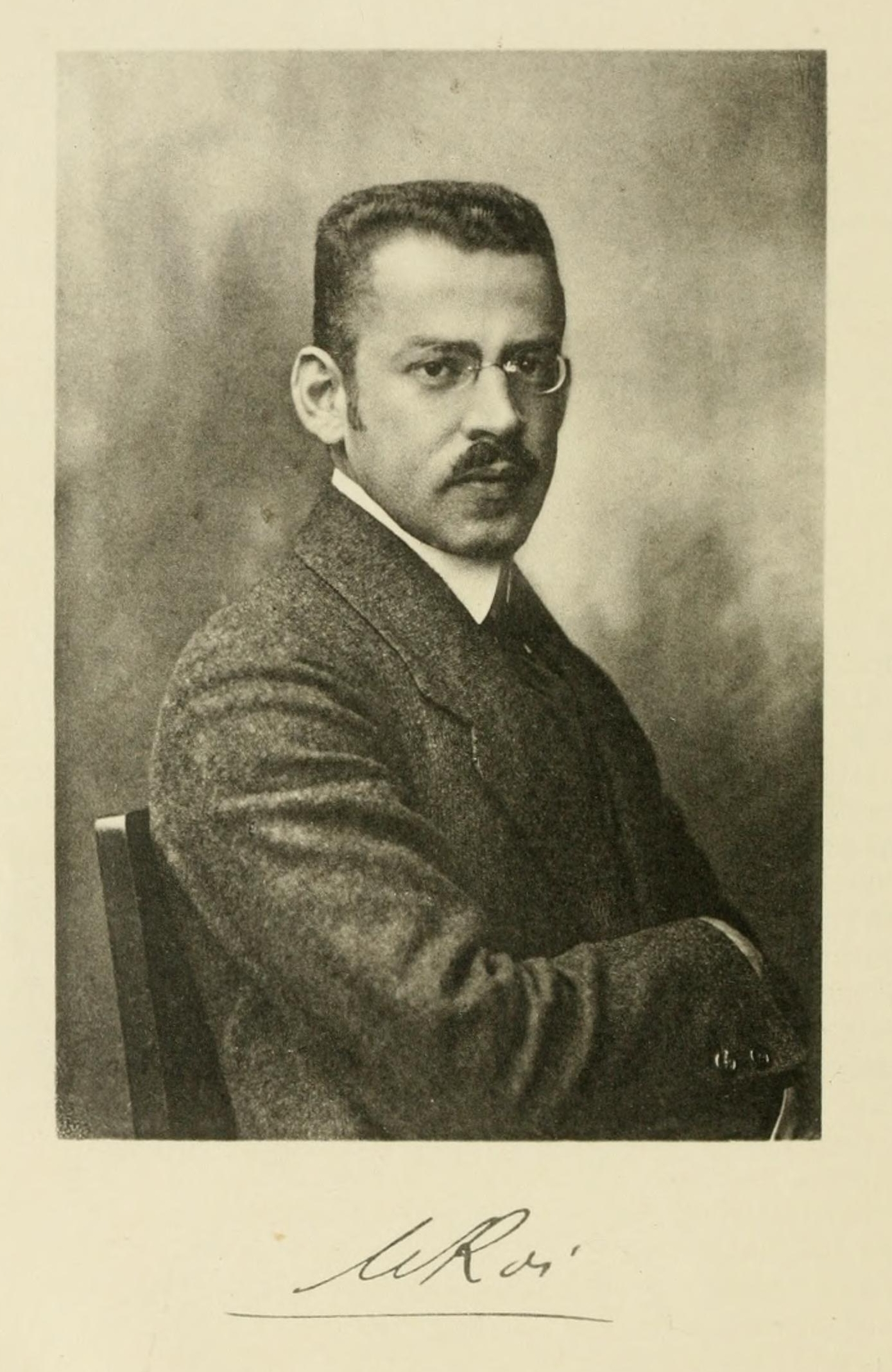

Otto le Roi (28 November 1878 – 11 October 1916) was a German naturalist of French ancestry. He worked at the Koenig Museum specializing mainly on birds but also took an interest in the Odonata, amphibia, and molluscs. He was killed on the Carpathian Front.

Le Roi was born in Zweibrücken and was of French ancestry with ancestors who had served French kings. After a humanist education at the Apostle Gymnasium in Cologne, he went to the University of Bonn and studied pharmacy. He passed the state examination in 1904 but decided to follow his interest in zoology and received a doctorate in 1906 for studies on cirripedia. He then joined the newly formed Koenig Museum. He went on several collecting expeditions including in 1907 and 1908 to Spitzbergen. He assisted Koenig in writing the Avifauna Spitzbergensis. In 1910 and 1912 he visited the Nile valley. In 1915 he joined the 11th Jäger Battalion in Marburg as a volunteer and in 1916 he was killed by artillery shelling while serving on a machine gun platoon on the Carpathian Front .

A mollusc Limicolaria leroii described by C. R. Boettger & Haas, 1913 was named after him but it is now a junior synonym of Limicolaria cailliaudi. A moth Eoophyla leroii, the neuropteran Berotta leroiana, the stonefly Neoperla leroiana and the grasshopper Aulocaroides leroii are named after him.
