= Ollenhauerstraße station =

Railway station in Bonn, Germany

Deutsche Telekom, Ollenhauerstraße
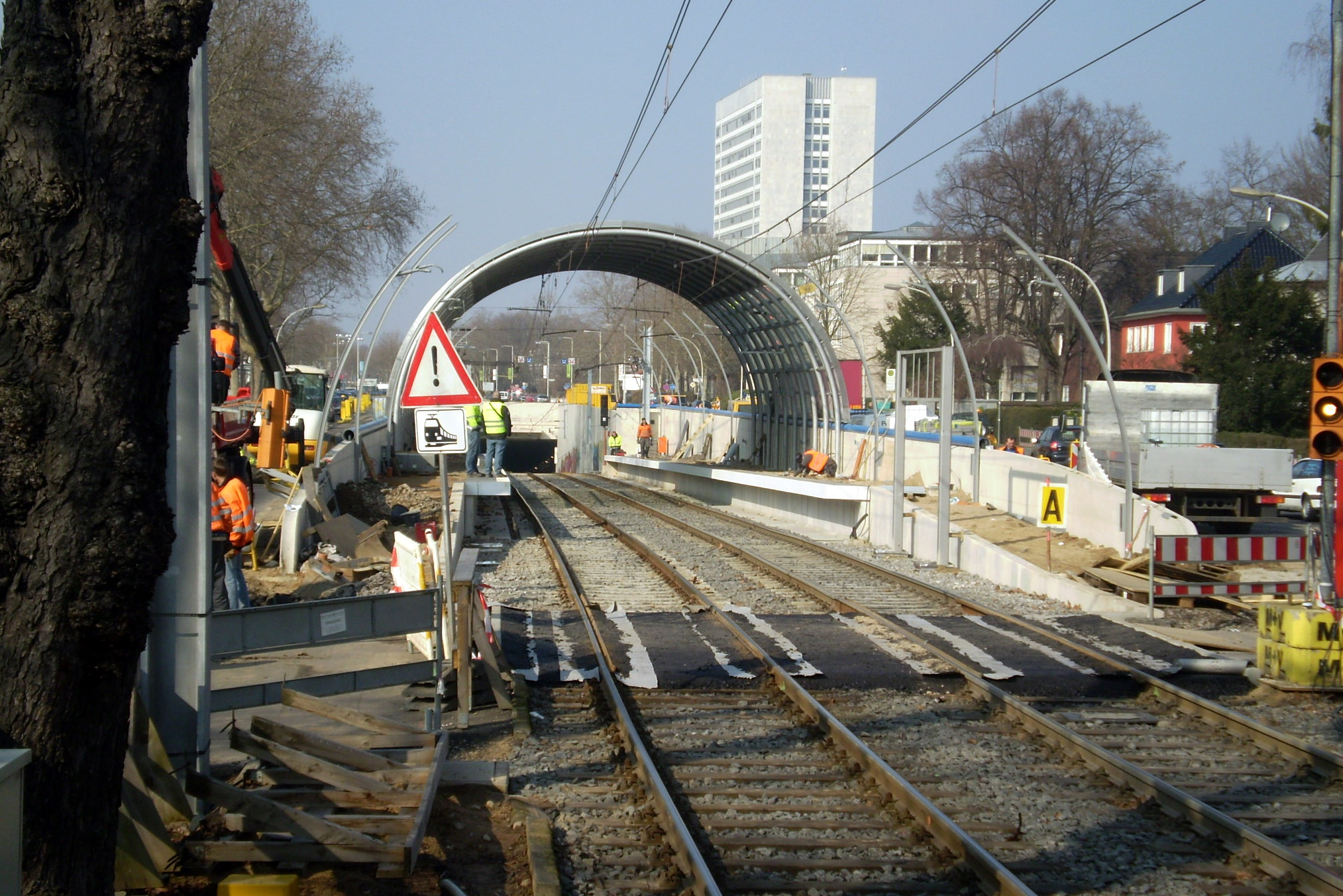
- Ollenhauerstraße under construction

General information
- Coordinates: 50.711°N 7.127°E
- System: Bonn Stadtbahn station
- Owner: Stadtwerke Bonn
- Operator: Kölner Verkehrsbetriebe
- Line: 63, 66, 67, 68
- Platforms: 2 side platforms
- Tracks: 2
- Connections: 16 (KVB)

Construction
- Structure type: At-grade

Other information
- Fare zone: VRS: 2600

Services
Preceding station	Bonn Stadtbahn	Following station
Heussallee towards Niehl Sebastianstraße	Line 16	Olof-Palme-Allee towards Bad Godesberg Stadthalle
Heussallee towards Tannenbusch Mitte	Line 63	Olof-Palme-Allee towards Bad Godesberg Stadthalle
Heussallee towards Siegburg/Bonn	Line 67	Olof-Palme-Allee towards Bad Godesberg Stadthalle
Heussallee towards Siegburg/Bonn	Line 66	Olof-Palme-Allee towards Bad Honnef
Heussallee towards Bornheim	Line 68	Olof-Palme-Allee towards Ramersdorf
Location

Ollenhauerstraße is one of the stations located at the Deutsche Telekom Building. This station is served by the Bonn Stadtbahn.
