= Samandarin =

Chemical compound (steroidal alkaloid)

Names
- Preferred IUPAC name (2S,5R,5aS,5bS,7aR,9S,10aS,10bS,12aR)-5a,7a-Dimethyloctadecahydro-2,5-epoxycyclopenta[5,6]naphtho[1,2-d]azepin-9-ol
- Other names Samandarine

Identifiers
CAS Number	467-51-6
3D model (JSmol)	Interactive image
ChEBI	CHEBI:36324
ChemSpider	16736008
KEGG	C19950
PubChem CID	9548773
UNII	IJN7TXF3HK
CompTox Dashboard (EPA)	DTXSID80894040
- InChI: InChI=1S/C19H31NO2/c1-18-6-5-14-13(15(18)8-12(21)9-18)4-3-11-7-17-20-10-16(22-17)19(11,14)2/h11-17,20-21H,3-10H2,1-2H3/t11-,12+,13-,14+,15+,16+,17+,18-,19+/m1/s1 Key: HJCSQOSWSRPBOU-XTXNWKRWSA-N; InChI=1S/C19H31NO2/c1-18-6-5-14-13(15(18)8-12(21)9-18)4-3-11-7-17-20-10-16(22-17)19(11,14)2/h11-17,20-21H,3-10H2,1-2H3/t11-,12+,13-,14+,15+,16+,17+,18-,19+/m1/s1 Key: HJCSQOSWSRPBOU-XTXNWKRWBO; Key: HJCSQOSWSRPBOU-XTXNWKRWSA-N
- SMILES: O[C@H]5C[C@@H]2[C@](C)(CC[C@@H]1[C@@]3(C)[C@@H]4CN[C@H](C[C@H]3CC[C@H]12)O4)C5

Properties
Chemical formula	C_{19}H_{31}NO_{2}
Molar mass	305.462 g·mol^{−1}
- Except where otherwise noted, data are given for materials in their standard state (at 25 °C [77 °F], 100 kPa). verify (what is ?) Infobox references

Samandarin or Samandarine is the main steroidal alkaloid secreted by the fire salamander (Salamandra salamandra). The compound is extremely toxic (LD_{50} = 70 μg/kg in mice). Poisoning can cause convulsions, respiratory paralysis, and eventual death. Samandarin is also believed to be the active ingredient in Salamander brandy, a Slovenian traditional medicinal alcoholic drink with purported hallucinogenic and aphrodisiac effects.

== Samandarine family ==
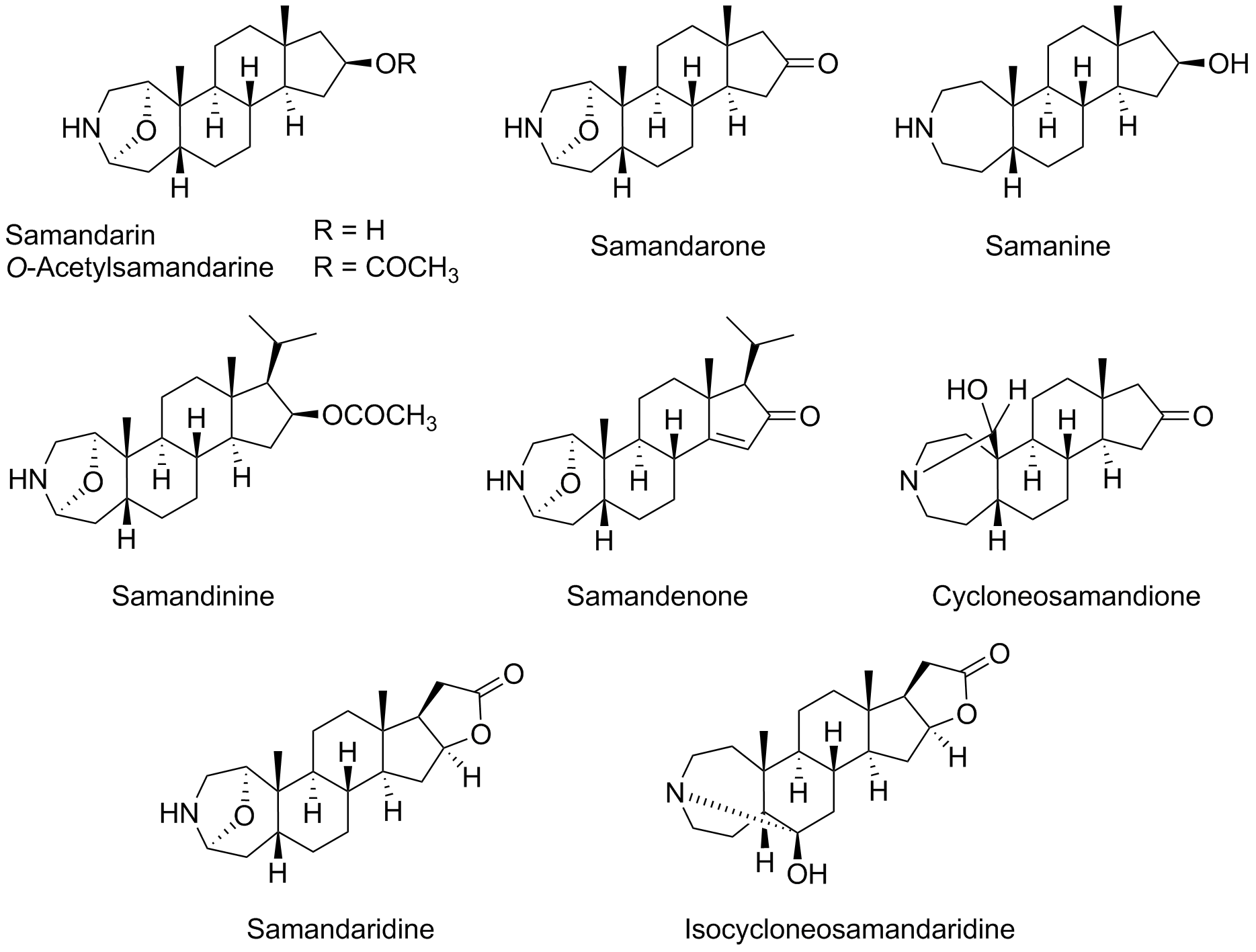
Nine isolated compounds in the samandarine family

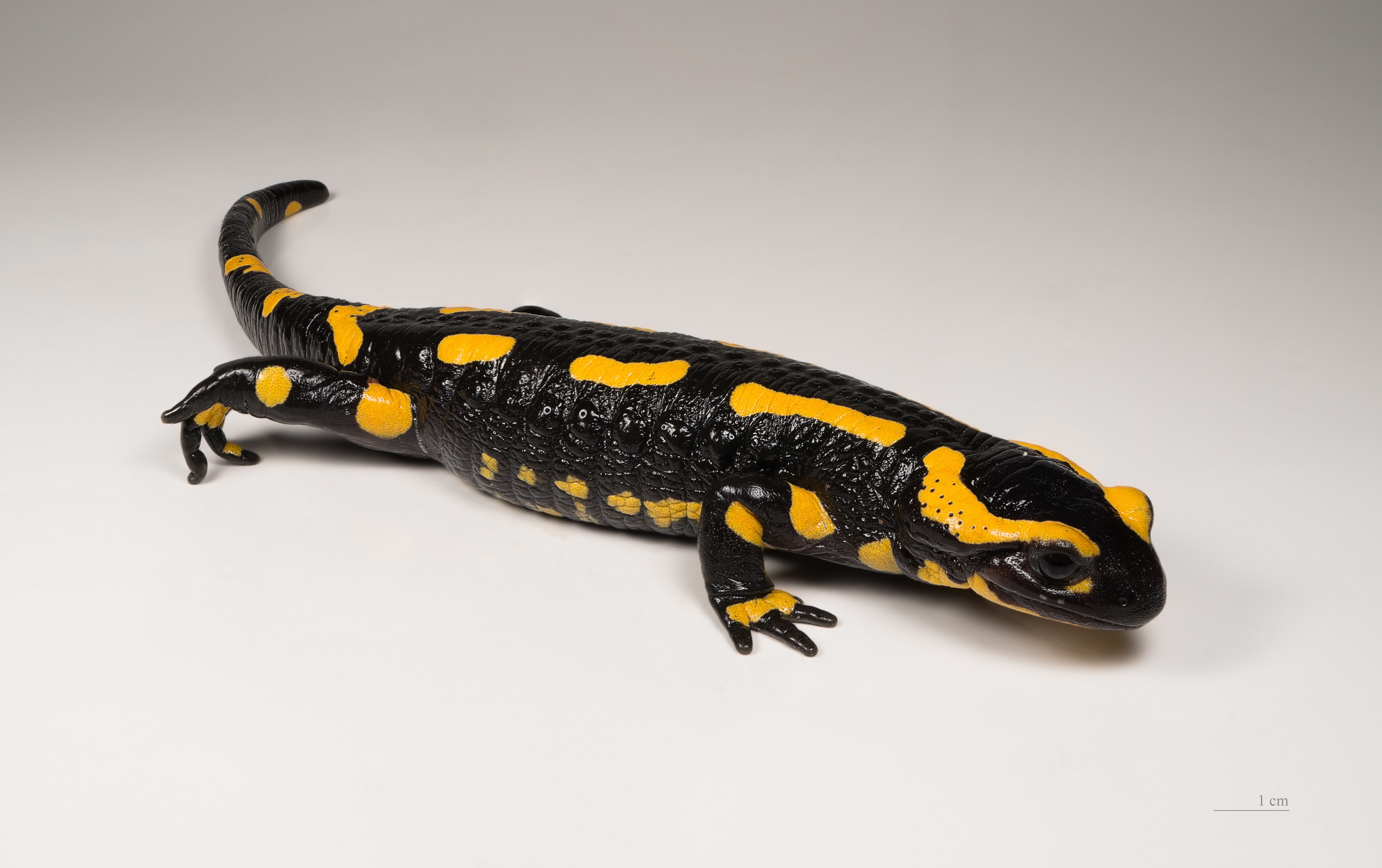
Fire salamander (Salamandra salamandra)

Samandarin belongs to a family of toxic compounds called samandarines. Samandarines are biologically active, lipid-soluble steroidal alkaloids. They all contain a 7-6-6-5 fused ring system. Nine structures in this family have been characterized.

Samandarines are exclusively produced and secreted by the fire salamander through their parotoid glands (20 mg/gland). Samandarin is the main component of these glandular secretions, although the precise ratio of alkaloids can vary from species to species and individual to individual.

Fire salamanders are indigenous to central Europe and reside in deciduous forests. Salamander secretions have been shown to be toxic and distasteful to mammals, birds, fishes, and even other amphibians. It has also been suggested that samandarines help to prevent the salamander from contracting bacterial and fungal infections.

== History ==
=== Discovery ===
Early descriptions of salamander poisonings were found in the writings of many physicians and philosophers in Classical antiquity and the Middle Ages. Little was known about the toxic compounds, but the recorded symptoms from poisonings were consistent with what is known today. The ancient healers also had some interesting theories about how one contracted poison from the salamander. They believed that the mere sighting of the black and yellow spotted animal or ingestion of salamander ashes would lead to sickness and death.

It was not until 1768 when Laurentius, a physician, discovered that the secretions from the skin glands of the salamander were the source of the poison. In 1866, Zalesky performed more studies on the toxicology of samandarines. He was able to isolate the family of alkaloids (believing they were one compound) and tested their toxicity on a variety of animals. He also found that the salamander could be poisoned by its own venom if it entered the salamander's bloodstream.

Samandarin was the first in the family of compounds to be isolated. In 1899, Faust purified samandarin as a crystalline sulfate salt by killing the salamanders with chloroform, mincing their corpses, and performing a number of acid–base extractions. In 1926, the pharmacology of samandarin was further examined by Gessner who administered the poison to animals and dissected their corpses. He determined that the poison primarily affected the central nervous system and spinal cord.

Most studies on samandarin and other samandarine alkaloids were performed in the mid-1900s by German scientists Schöpf and Habermehl. They were able to elucidate the structures of nine samandarines and found that samandarin was the main alkaloid in the salamander's secretions. The structure and stereochemistry of samandarin was confirmed in 1961 using X-ray crystallography. In 1968, Habermehl and Haaf also investigated biosynthesis of samandarines with in vitro and in vivo experiments, finding that the compounds originate from a cholesterol precursor.

=== Use in Salamander Brandy ===
It is believed that the samandarine family of compounds is the active ingredient in an indigenous Slovenian drink called Salamander brandy. Salamander brandy was first brought to attention in 1995 by an article published in the Slovenian magazine Mladina, describing the hallucinogenic and intensely aphrodisiac effects of the drink.

Ogorevc, the author of the article, writes about his first-hand experience of obtaining and experimenting with Salamander brandy. In the excerpt below, Ogorevc describes his intoxication with Salamander brandy:

And then it...started unnaturally, colorfully glittering around the treetops and trees, which were weirdly, hysterically rushing into the depths of gorges...It was as if I were totally unburdened by the biology of extraterrestrial beings from some other planet and watched everything, the grass, the insects or a grazing cow in the vicinity...and absolutely everything seemed new and strange, and I wished to fuck something, anything. And in this almost full absence from the world...I chose the beech tree. Their trunks...seemed horribly erotic to me. ...After this I finally crashed into the wet leaves and maybe even slept for a while. But damn, a few salamanders walked nearby. And they said with their mysterious voices: look, look, who’s there, not a salamander for sure...

Ogorevc also reported on a few methods he observed for making Salamander brandy. One is by adding live black and yellow spotted salamanders to a barrel of fermenting fruit (one salamander for every ten liters). The mixture is then left for a couple of months while the salamander secretes its toxins (supposedly samandarines) to avoid ethanol absorption until its eventual death. Another method he describes is to hang a salamander by its hind legs under a stream of brandy during the distillation process. The salamander will excrete its poisons to defend itself while the brandy continues to wash away its secretions. A third technique is to kill and dry the salamanders and hang them above the pot of cooking fruit. The steam that rises will extract the poisonous compounds from the salamander and will then be distilled and collected in a vessel.

The publication of Ogorevc's account brought much public attention and curiosity to this enigmatic drink. Yet, the credibility of the existence of Salamander brandy as described by Ogorevc has been brought into question. Anthropologist Miha Kozorog from University of Ljubljana decided to investigate Ogorevc's claims in 2003. Although he and his colleagues traveled to the region where Ogorevc supposedly bought Salamander brandy, Kozorog was unable to obtain any samples.

However, from many discussions with the locals in that region, he learned that Salamander brandy was not a psychedelic drink as exclaimed by Ogorevc and the media but was rather a derogatory term for bad or fake brandy. The locals explain that brandy distillers who make Salamander brandy are swindlers. Those who do consume Salamander brandy, only do so accidentally and as a result, will experience paralysis in the legs (which is one of the symptoms of samandarin poisoning). Kozorog quotes “there are fair and good brandy distillers who cook pure and good brandy; there are also those who swindle with brandy and whose brandy is a fake one (and sometimes poisoned)…”

Kozorog also learned of a folktale surrounding Salamander brandy. The story tells a tale of a woman who lived on a farm and often cooked a special brandy to which she added a live salamander. Those who drank her brandy were driven mad from the poison. Whenever the devil came by for a drink, the locals could hear terrible rumbling throughout their village as the devil ran around intoxicated from her concoction.

In his research, Kozorog was unable to find any hard evidence of the hallucinogenic properties Ogorevc described in Salamander brandy. Considering the methods that have been described for preparing Salamander brandy, it is likely that samandarine toxins do play a role in the effects of the drink. However, the brandy is rather stigmatized among locals as adulterated brandy. Kozorog claims that the excitement surrounding the psychedelic properties of Salamander brandy was engendered mainly by Ogorevc's humorous writing style and grandiose media coverage.

== Biological effects ==
Samandarin is extremely toxic (LD_{50} = 70 μg/kg in mice, LD_{50} = 700-900 μg/kg in dogs) but little is known about its precise mechanism of action. Samandarin mainly affects the central nervous system, specifically neurons in the spinal cord. No treatment or antidote is known for the poison. Although samandarin is thought to have some local anesthetic effects, there are currently no therapeutic uses for samandarin.

Samandarin poisoning can occur through transdermal exposure or oral ingestion. In the early stages of samandarin poisoning, there is over-excitation of the muscles – restlessness, hypertension, rapid breathing, dilated pupils, and increased mucus and saliva. In the later stages, samandarin can cause convulsions, dyspnea, and paralysis. Death eventually occurs by respiratory paralysis after a few hours. Animals poisoned with samandarin show hemorrhaging in the internal organs.

The hallucinogenic and aphrodisiac effects of this molecule class have been mentioned in folklore and reported by media but are largely unfounded.

== Synthesis ==
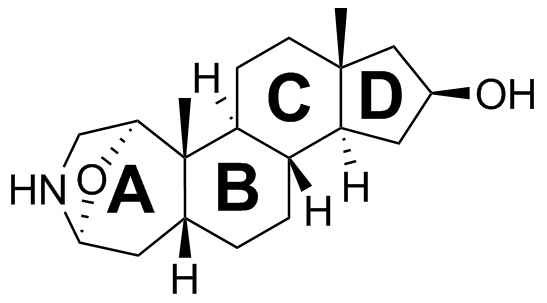
Samandarin with all rings labeled

=== By the salamander ===
Habermehl and Haaf have investigated the biosynthesis of samandarin with in vivo and in vitro experiments. Samandarin is synthesized from cholesterol in the liver, testes, or ovaries. They found that the enlargement of ring A occurs by nitrogen insertion from glutamine. The degradation of the carbon chain and hydroxylation of ring D is shown through the intermediates in the scheme below.

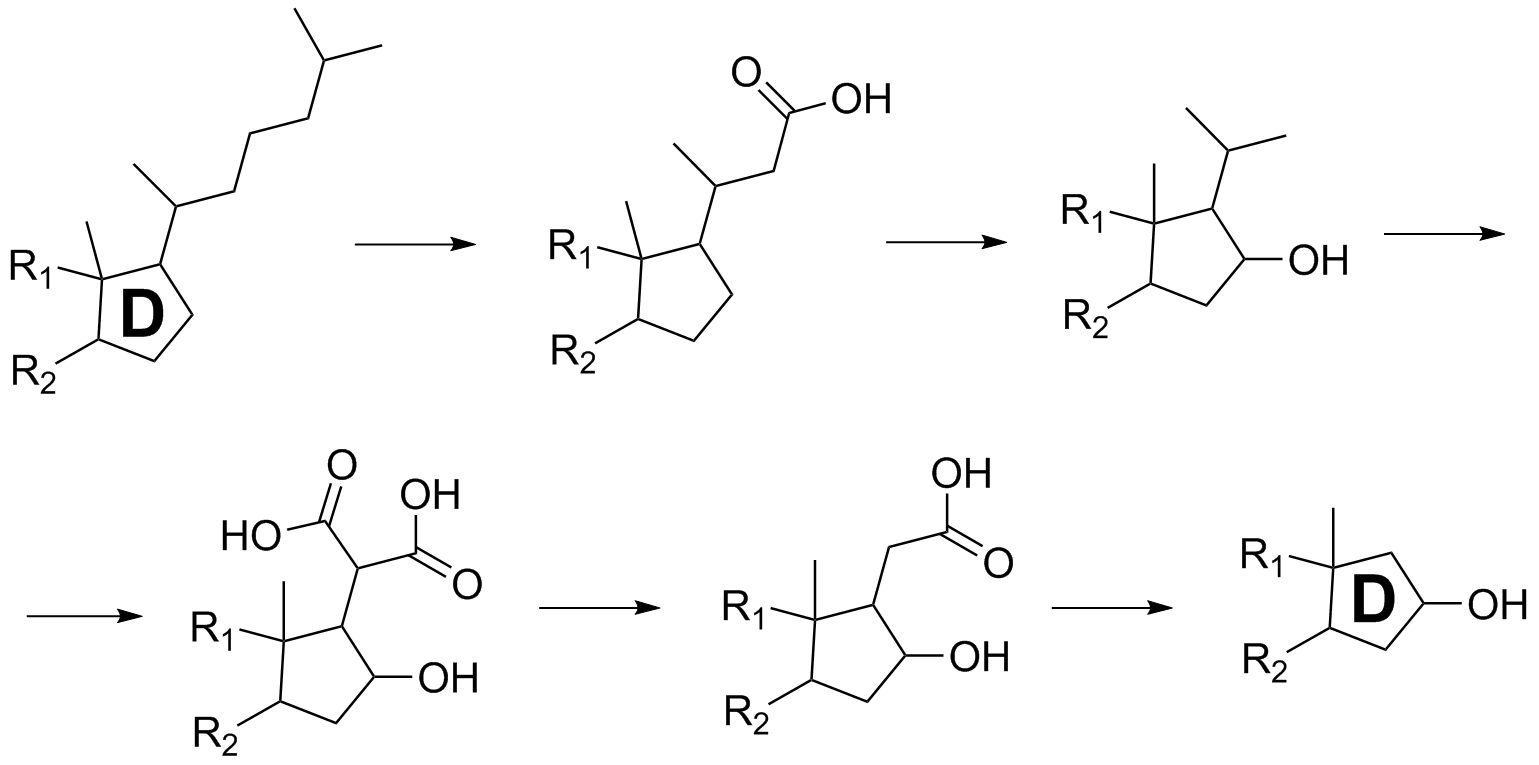
Intermediates showing the functionalization of ring D in samandarin

The carbon chain on the D ring of cholesterol is degraded by functionalizations with carboxyl groups and sequential decarboxylation reactions. A hydroxyl group is also installed on the adjacent carbon to yield samandarin. These steps are performed by enzymes in the salamander. The details of the biosynthesis have not been elucidated completely.

=== In the lab ===
The chemical synthesis of samandarin was of interest by a few groups in the 1960s and 1970s but has not been pursued in recent years. The construction of ring A was of greatest synthetic interest. Shimizu in 1976 was able to successfully construct the bridged oxazolidone system with correct stereoselectivity. The steps proceeded with low to moderate yields.

The last few steps of the synthesis is shown below. Using m-chloroperobenzoic acid, an epoxide is created onto the alkene. The addition of sodium azide will facilitate the anti-Markovnikov opening of the epoxide. Reduction with sodium borohydride completes the azaheterocycle and bridged oxazolidone through either a cyclic amidine intermediate or imino ester intermediate.

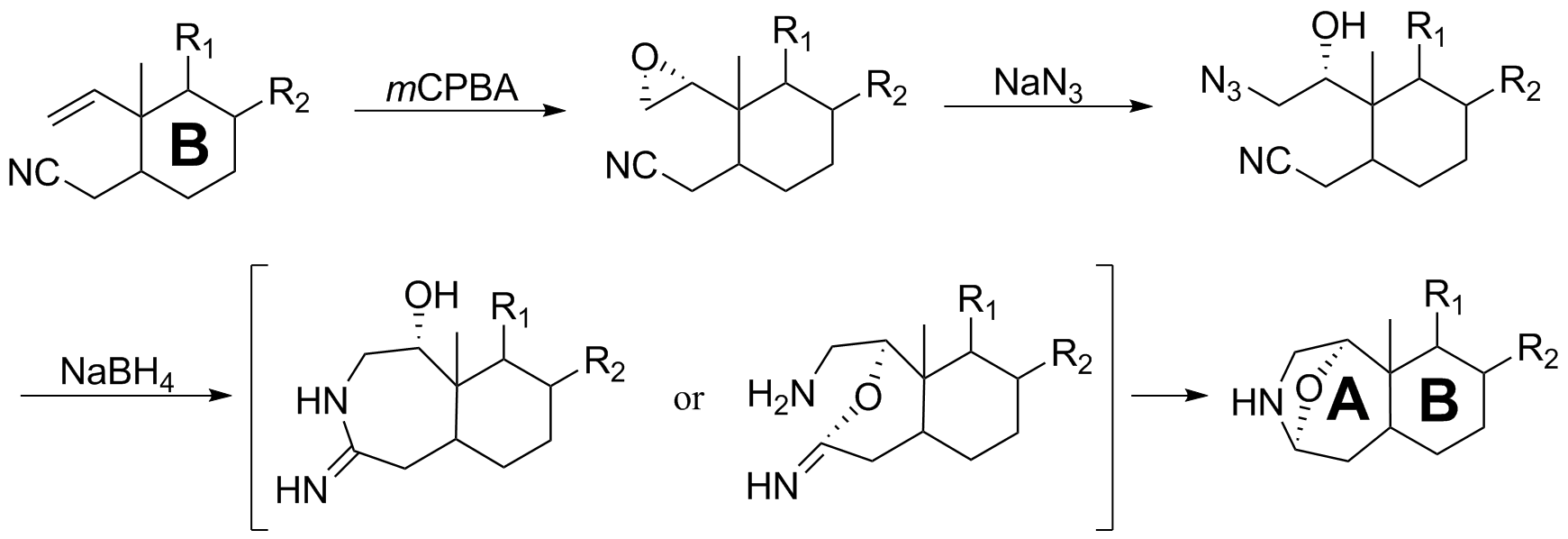
Last steps of Shimizu's synthesis of ring A in samandarin

== See also ==
- Samandaridine
