= Heussallee station =

Railway station in Bonn, Germany

Heussallee/Museumseile
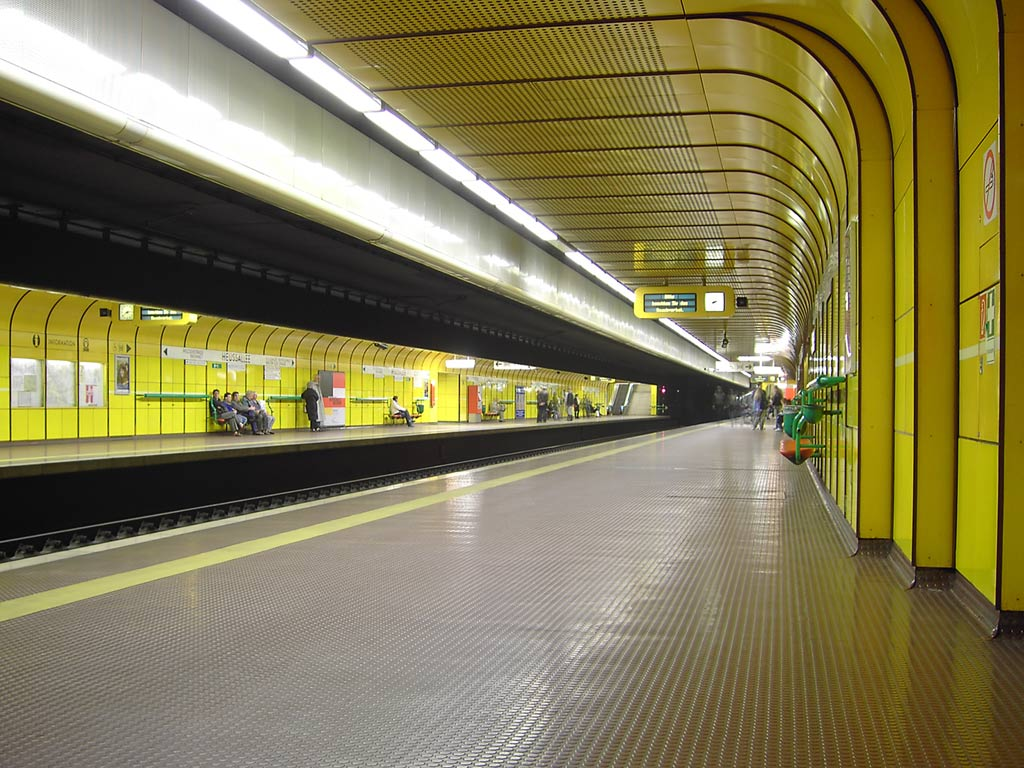
- Station platform

General information
- Coordinates: 50.7167°N 7.1205°E
- System: Bonn Stadtbahn station
- Owner: Stadtwerke Bonn
- Operator: Kölner Verkehrsbetriebe
- Line: 63, 66, 67, 68
- Platforms: 2 side platforms
- Tracks: 2
- Connections: 16 (KVB)

Construction
- Structure type: Underground
- Platform levels: 1

Other information
- Fare zone: VRS: 2600

Services
Preceding station	Bonn Stadtbahn	Following station
Museum Koenig towards Niehl Sebastianstraße	Line 16	Ollenhauerstraße towards Bad Godesberg Stadthalle
Museum Koenig towards Tannenbusch Mitte	Line 63	Ollenhauerstraße towards Bad Godesberg Stadthalle
Museum Koenig towards Siegburg/Bonn	Line 67	Ollenhauerstraße towards Bad Godesberg Stadthalle
Museum Koenig towards Siegburg/Bonn	Line 66	Ollenhauerstraße towards Bad Honnef
Museum Koenig towards Bornheim	Line 68	Ollenhauerstraße towards Ramersdorf
Location

Heussallee/Museumsmeile is a station on the Bonn Stadtbahn served by SWB lines 63, 66, 67 and 68 and KVB's line 16.

It is an important station in Bonn's Stadtbahn network as the station is used heavily by commuters who work in nearby offices. Close to Heussallee/Museumsmeile is World Conference Center Bonn as well as the headquarters of Deutsche Post DHL Group and Deutsche Welle and offices of the United Nations. Additionally, the second seats of office of the German president (Villa Hammerschmidt) and the German chancellor (Palais Schaumburg) are located there. The former Federal Chancellery is now used by the Federal Ministry for Economic Cooperation and Development as its main office.

Nonetheless, the station is also used by people interested in the arts and culture. Heussallee/Museumsmeile serves Bundeskunsthalle (Federal Art Exhibition Hall), Kunstmuseum Bonn (Art Museum Bonn) and Haus der Geschichte der Bundesrepublik Deutschland (House of the History of the Federal Republic of Germany).

== Gallery ==
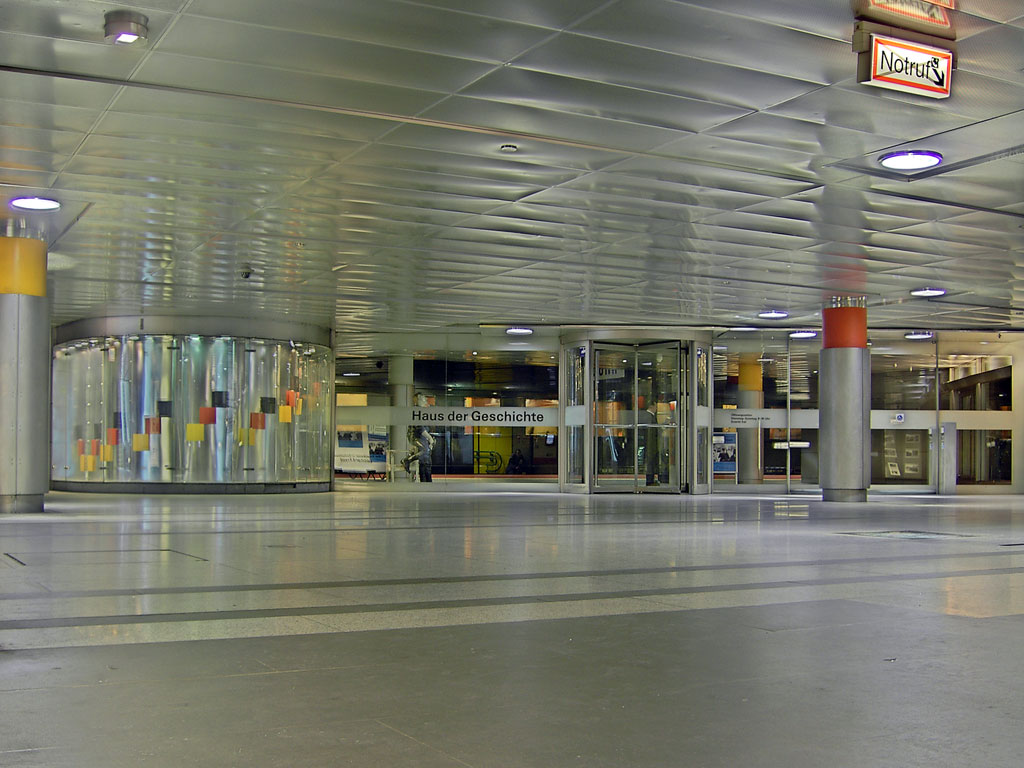
Mezzanine level

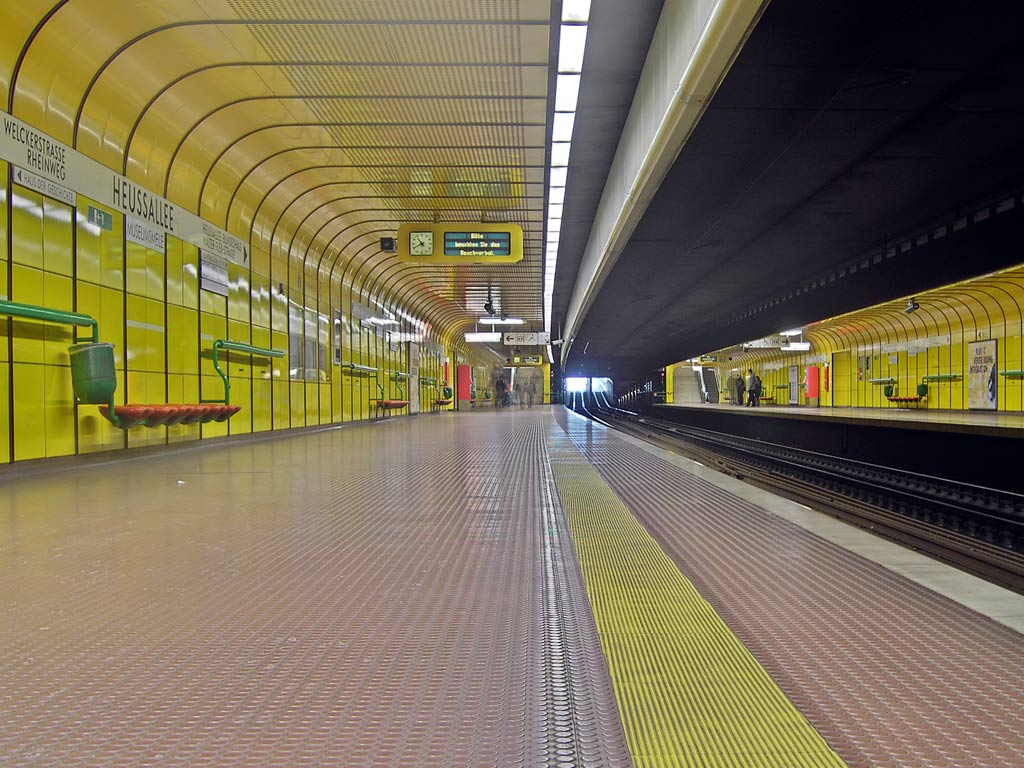
Station platform before the demolishment of the old ramp

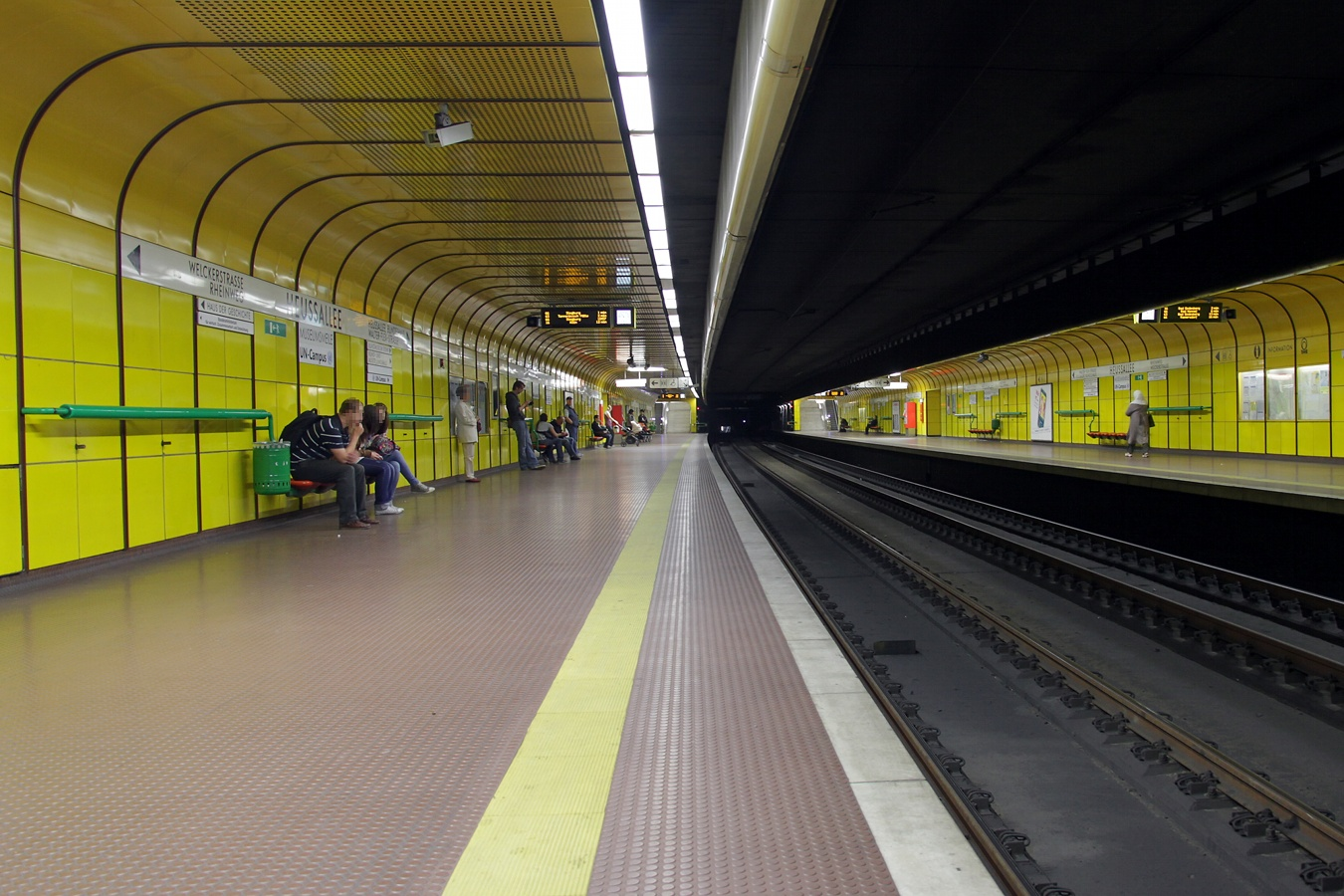
Station platform after the demolishment of the old ramp
