= Universität/Markt station =

Railway station in Bonn, Germany

Coordinates: 50.7341°N 7.1045°E

Universität/Markt
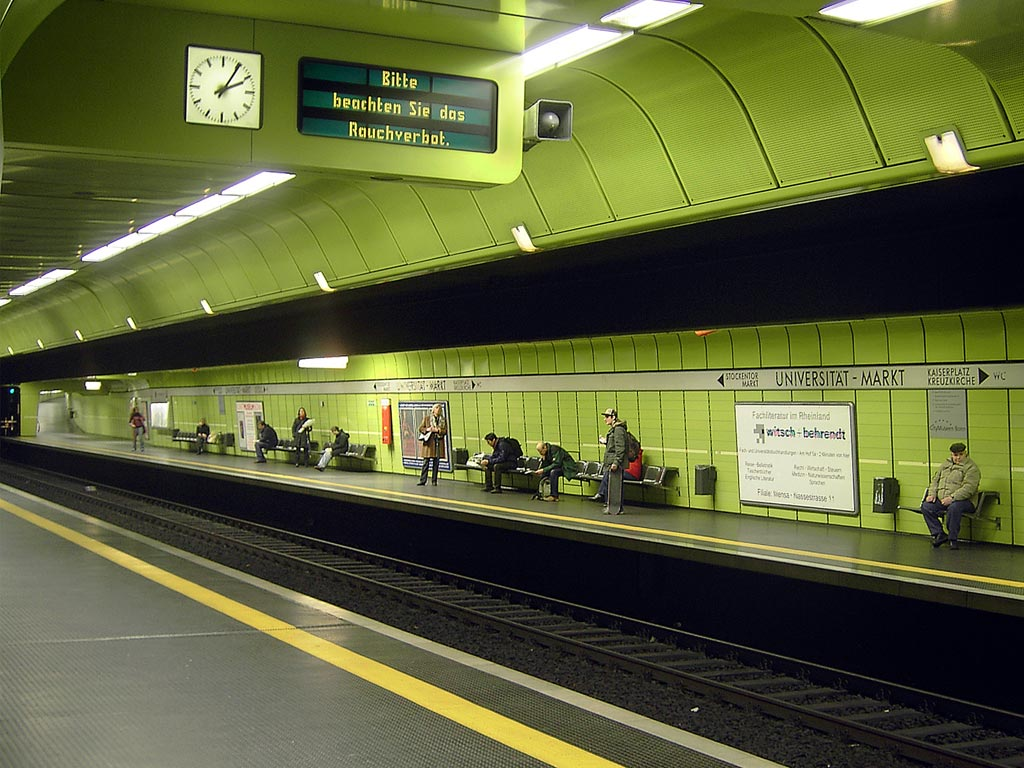
- Universität-Markt station

General information
- System: SWB light rail station
- Owner: SWB
- Platforms: Two side platforms

Construction
- Structure type: Underground
- Accessible: true

Other information
- Fare zone: VRS: 2600

Services
Preceding station	Bonn Stadtbahn	Following station
Bonn Hbf towards Niehl Sebastianstraße	Line 16	Juridicum towards Bad Godesberg Stadthalle
Bonn Hbf towards Tannenbusch Mitte	Line 63	Juridicum towards Bad Godesberg Stadthalle
Bonn Hbf towards Siegburg/Bonn	Line 67	Juridicum towards Bad Godesberg Stadthalle
Bonn Hbf towards Siegburg/Bonn	Line 66	Juridicum towards Bad Honnef
Bonn Hbf towards Bornheim	Line 68	Juridicum towards Ramersdorf
Location

Universität/Markt is a stop on the Bonn Stadtbahn in Bonn, Germany. It is located directly beneath the Hofgarten and runs parallel to the main building of the University of Bonn.

The eastern entrance to the stop, which opens out onto Stockenstraße, is unusual in that it uses a series of long ramps for access instead of the usual combination of stairs and escalators.
