= Bundesrechnungshof station =

Railway station in Bonn, Germany

Bundesrechnungshof
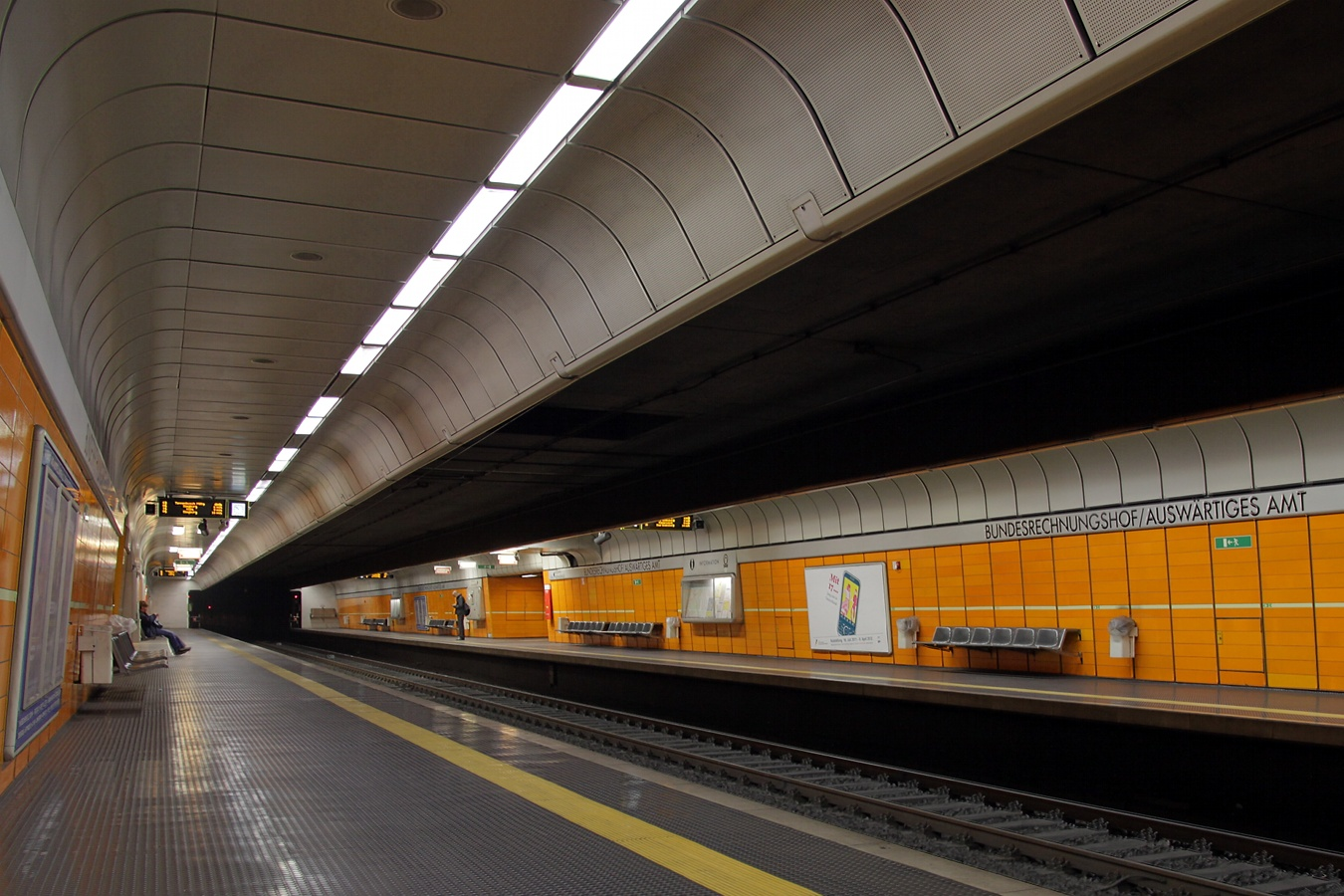
- Bundesrechnungshof station

General information
- Coordinates: 50°43′30″N 7°6′42″E
- System: SWB light rail station
- Owner: Stadtwerke Bonn (SWB)
- Platforms: 2 side-platforms
- Tracks: 2

Construction
- Structure type: Underground

Other information
- Fare zone: VRS: 2600

History
- Opened: March 22, 1975

Services
Preceding station	Bonn Stadtbahn	Following station
Juridicum towards Niehl Sebastianstraße	Line 16	Museum Koenig towards Bad Godesberg Stadthalle
Juridicum towards Tannenbusch Mitte	Line 63	Museum Koenig towards Bad Godesberg Stadthalle
Juridicum towards Siegburg/Bonn	Line 67	Museum Koenig towards Bad Godesberg Stadthalle
Juridicum towards Siegburg/Bonn	Line 66	Museum Koenig towards Bad Honnef
Juridicum towards Bornheim	Line 68	Museum Koenig towards Ramersdorf
Location

Bundesrechnungshof/Auswärtiges Amt is a station on the Bonn Stadtbahn in Bonn, Germany. The Bonn Stadt-Bahn lines that go through this station are: 16, 63, 66, 67 and 68.

The stop is beneath the Adenauerallee, directly lain at the Bundesrechnungshof.
