= Alexander Koenig =

German naturalist and zoologist

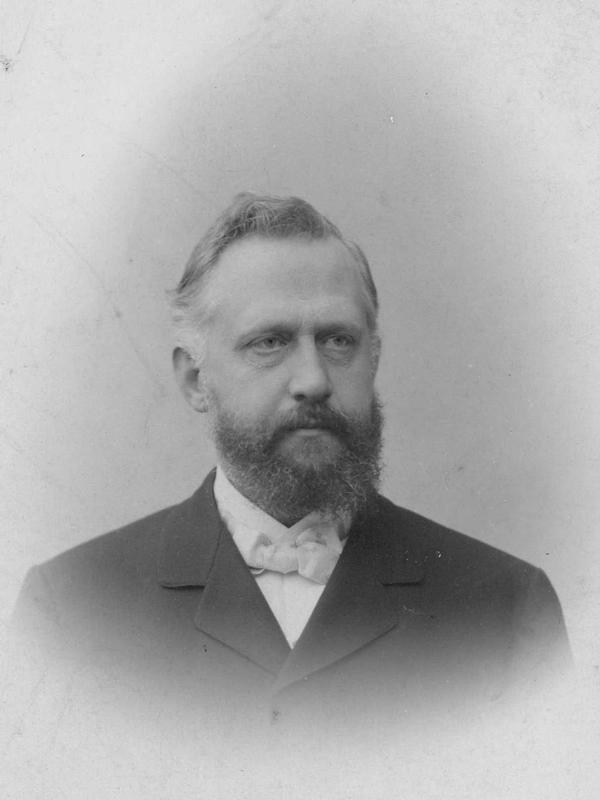
- Born: 20 February 1858; St Petersburg, Russia
- Died: 16 July 1940 (aged 82); Mecklenburg Castle, Germany
- Education: Universities of Greifswald, Kiel, Berlin and Marburg
- Known for: Foundation of the Museum Koenig in Bonn
- Spouse: Margarethe Westphal
- Scientific career
- Fields: Zoology
- Thesis: Ein Beitrag zur Mallophagenfauna (A contribution to the Mallophaga fauna)

Alexander Ferdinand Koenig (20 February 1858 – 16 July 1940) was a German naturalist and zoologist. Making use of the family wealth earned from the sugar business, he went on collection expeditions and founded what is now known as the Museum Koenig in Bonn in 1912.

== Biography ==
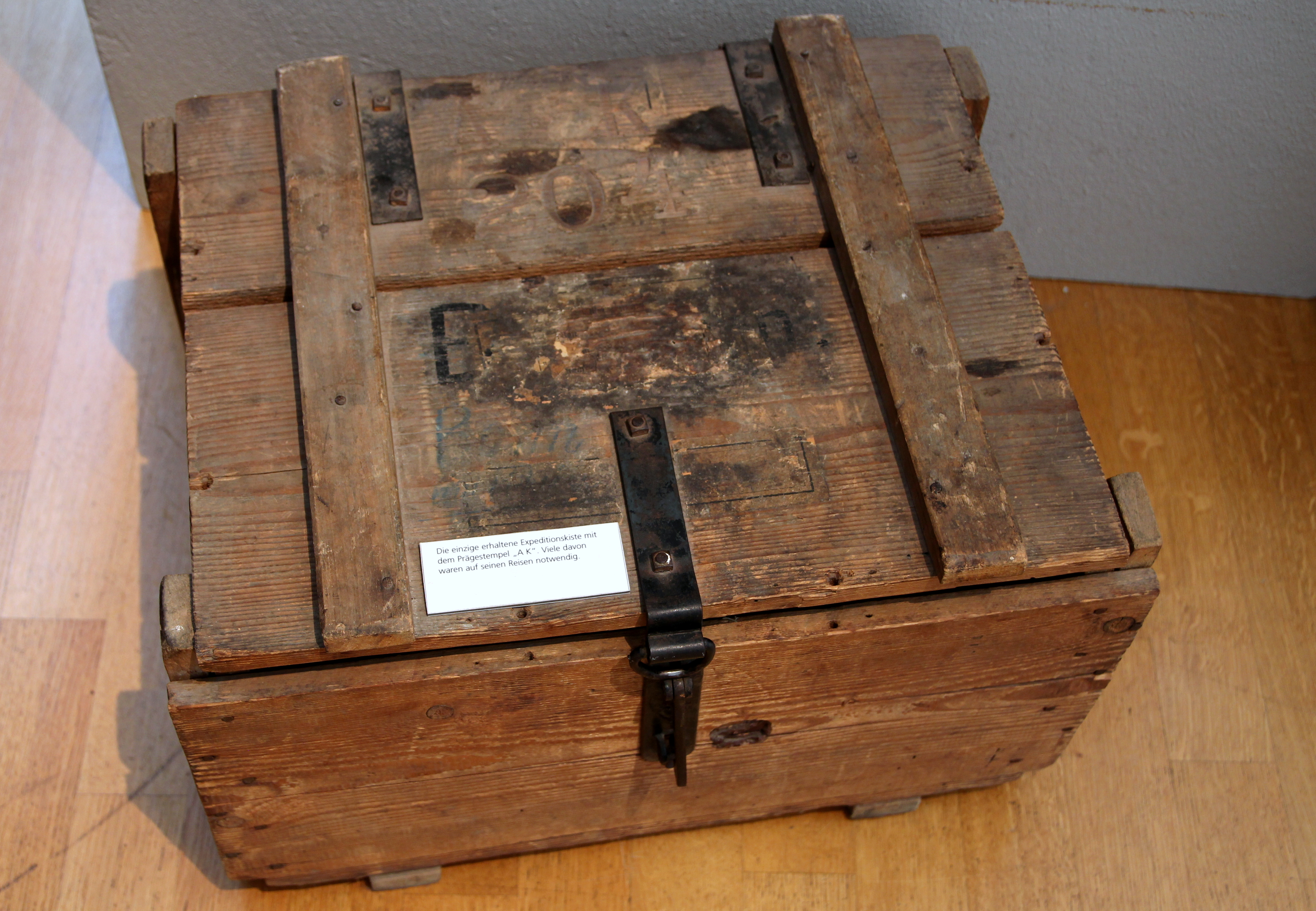
Box used in one of Koenig's expeditions, exhibited in Museum Koenig

Koenig was born in St Petersburg, Russia, the third son of his father Leopold (1821–1903) who was a successful merchant involved in the sugar trade. Leopold was the son of Thuringian baker Johann Georg Koenig (1785–1856) and learned to process sugar at a young age. He married Caroline and obtained a loan from his mother-in-law to establish a successful sugar factory and at the height of the business they employed nearly 20000 people and held farms across Ukraine. Alexander Koenig grew up in Bonn where his father owned Villa Koenig (now called Villa Hammerschmidt). Koenig became interested in natural history at an early age and started to collect specimens in a private natural history cabinet at the villa. His schooling involved frequent changes due to conflicts with teachers. In 1873 he went to a school near Kösen, followed by the Arnoldinum at Burgsteinfurt until 1880. He spent the next two years at a gymnasium in Demmin, Pomerania and while on a walk he met Margarethe Westphal, whom he married in 1884. He then studied zoology at the universities of Greifswald, Kiel, Berlin and Marburg, where he received his doctorate in with a thesis on Mallophaga, "Ein Beitrag zur Mallophagenfauna". He funded expeditions to the Spitzbergen region of the Arctic and to Africa, where he visited Egypt and Sudan along with his wife Margarethe — on six occasions he traveled to the Nile.

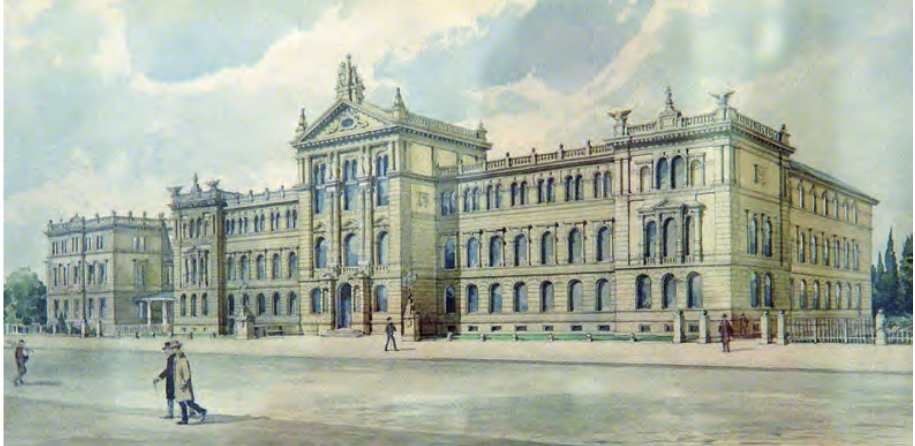
Museum Koenig in 1912

His father provided funds for Alexander to conduct his collection expeditions. He also provided money for the construction of a museum building. With his collections he founded the Museum Koenig in Bonn and it was inaugurated on September 3, 1912, the birthday of his wife. The building was designed by Gustav Holland. The museum collection includes specimens Koenig collected from even early in his life. Construction of the museum stopped in 1914 following the outbreak of World War I. The family lost all their former assets following the Russian revolution of 1917. The museum served as housing for a military hospital and the collections were kept in the basement. It was reopened only after Koenig was able to negotiate with the German Reich and it was reopened on May 13, 1934. Koenig's museum was visited and admired by Hermann Göring. Koenig declared his support for Hitler and even recited a poem in praise of him at a 1936 meeting of the German Ornithologists' Society. His statement was published in a local newspaper - "Only in peace, but also in full awareness of its own power and strength, can a people rise to true prosperity on a morally sound basis. And it is Führer Adolf Hitler who is helping the German people to achieve this!" Koenig was given various honours and a street in Burgsteinfurt was named after him. He died at Blücherhof Manor in Mecklenburg Castle which he had purchased in 1904. His wife died on 14 May 1943. As honorary citizens of Bonn, they were buried in the Bonn South Cemetery. Alexander-Koenig-Strasse was named in his honour in Bonn.

== Selected works ==
- Ein Beitrag zur Mallophagenfauna (1884)
- Avifauna Spitzbergensis : Forschungsreisen nach der Bären-Insel und dem Spitzbergen-Archipel, mit ihren faunistischen und floristischen Ergebnissen (with Otto Le Roi), 1911 – Birdlife of Spitzbergen: research trips to Bear Island and the Svalbard archipelago, with its faunal and floristic results.
- Katalog der nido-oologischen Sammlung (Vogeleiersammlung) im Museum Alexander Koenig (4 volumes, 1932) – Catalogue of nido-oological specimens (bird egg collection) in the Alexander Koenig Museum.
- Die Vögel am Nil : von seiner Mündung bis in das Gebiet seiner Quellflüsse (Weisser Nil) auf Grund eigener Reisen und Beobachtungen in Wort und Bild dargestellt (2 volumes 1936) – The birds of the Nile region.
- Koenig, Alexander (1907). "Die Geier Aegyptens". Journal für Ornithologie (in German). 55 (1): 59–134. Bibcode:1907JOrn...55...59K. doi:10.1007/BF02098853. S2CID 26329371.
