= Juridicum station =

Railway station in Bonn, Germany

Juridicum
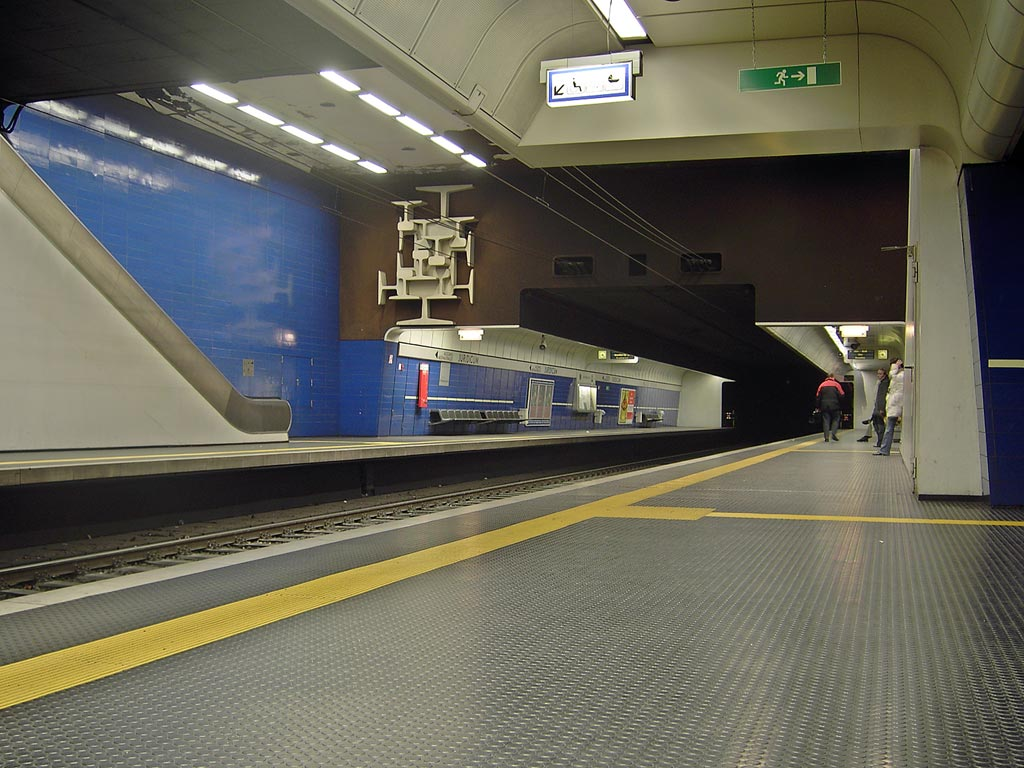
- Juridicum station

General information
- Coordinates: 50.7298°N 7.1088°E
- System: SWB light rail station
- Owner: SWB
- Platforms: 2 side-platforms
- Tracks: 2

Construction
- Structure type: Underground

Other information
- Fare zone: VRS: 2600

History
- Opened: 22 March 1975

Services
Preceding station	Bonn Stadtbahn	Following station
Universität/Markt towards Niehl Sebastianstraße	Line 16	Bundesrechnungshof towards Bad Godesberg Stadthalle
Universität/Markt towards Tannenbusch Mitte	Line 63	Bundesrechnungshof towards Bad Godesberg Stadthalle
Universität/Markt towards Siegburg/Bonn	Line 67	Bundesrechnungshof towards Bad Godesberg Stadthalle
Universität/Markt towards Siegburg/Bonn	Line 66	Bundesrechnungshof towards Bad Honnef
Universität/Markt towards Bornheim	Line 68	Bundesrechnungshof towards Ramersdorf
Location

Juridicum is a stop on the Bonn Stadtbahn in Bonn, Germany. Stadtbahn lines passing through this station are: 16, 63, 66, 67 and 68.

The station, Juridicum, is located on Adenauerallee, the city's main thoroughfare, between a prominent school building and the campus of the university's School of Law and Economics. The station was named after the main Law School building, Juridicum. The secondary school across the street bears the name of the composer, Ludwig van Beethoven, who was born in Bonn. Signs in the station itself read simply Juridicum. The station consists of a mezzanine level and two side platforms beneath it, each 100 meters long. The station is popular both with Law school students and students of the secondary school, Beethoven-Gymnasium.

When the station was opened in 1975, the color scheme of the station was blue, following the original design by renowned architect Alexander von Branca.
