= Museum Koenig Bonn =

Natural history museum in Bonn, Germany

Coordinates: 50°43′19″N 7°06′49″E

Museum Koenig
- Zoologisches Forschungsmuseum Alexander Koenig

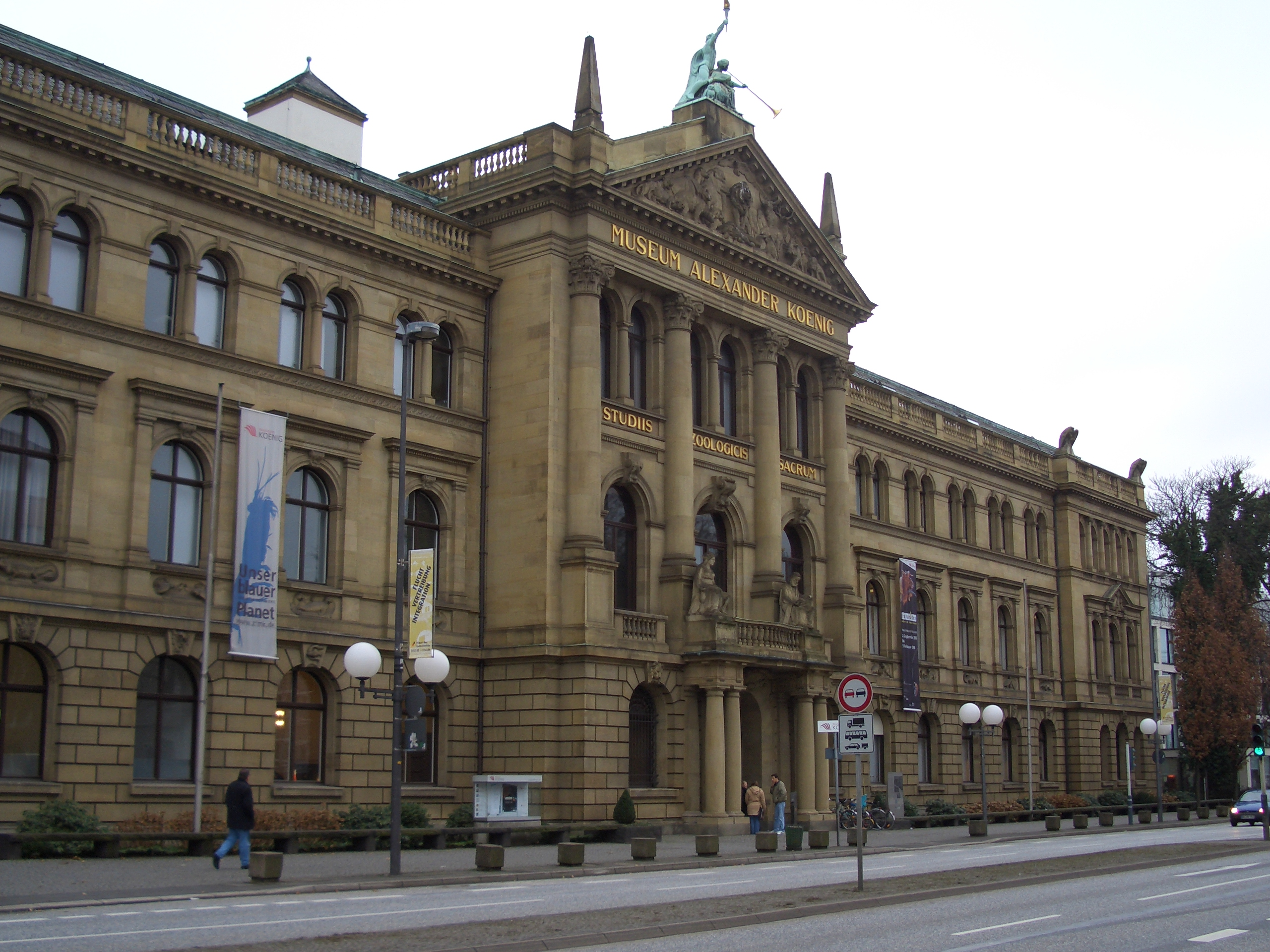
- Established: 13 May 1934
- Location: Adenauerallee 160; Bonn, North Rhine-Westphalia, Germany
- Type: Natural history
- Visitors: 123,000 (2005)
- Director: Bernhard Misof
- Public transit access: Museum Koenig
- Website: bonn.leibniz-lib.de/en

The Museum Koenig Bonn is a natural history museum and zoological research institution in Bonn, Germany. The museum was formerly known as Zoological Research Museum Alexander Koenig (German: Zoologisches Forschungsmuseum Alexander Koenig, abbreviated ZFMK). It is named after Alexander Koenig, who donated his collection of specimens to the institution. The museum was opened in 1934 and forms, since 2001, the Leibniz Institute for the Analysis of Biodiversity Change, abbreviated LIB, together with the Museum of Nature Hamburg. The LIB is affiliated with the Leibniz Association.

On 1 September 1948, the museum saw the opening of the Parlamentarischer Rat, the organ to create the German constitution. The actual proceedings happened in the nearby Pädagogische Akademie, the later Bundeshaus.

== History ==
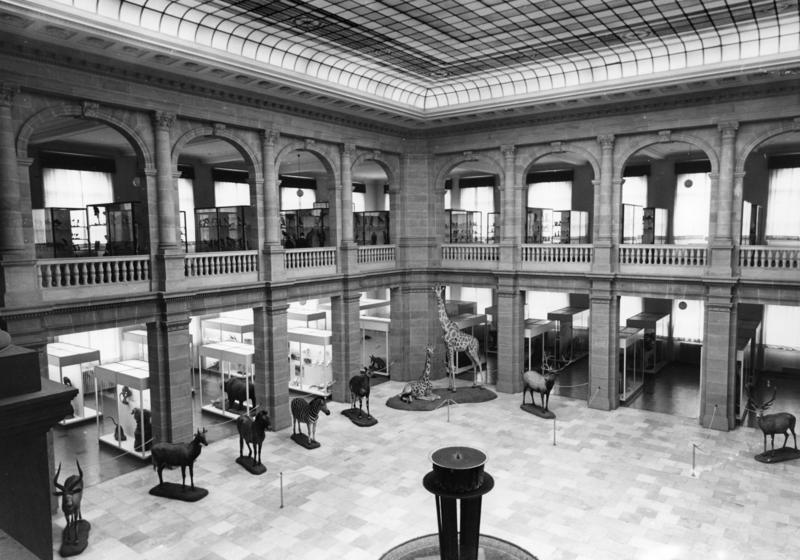
The museum in 1962.

The museum was founded by the private scholar Alexander Koenig (1858–1940) as a private institute for zoological research and public education. Koenig was the son of a wealthy merchant, Leopold Koenig, and began collecting birds and mammals as a boy. He later studied zoology and received a doctorate in natural history in 1884. In the following years, he organized and funded several expeditions to the Arctic and Africa and greatly expanded his private collection of specimens.

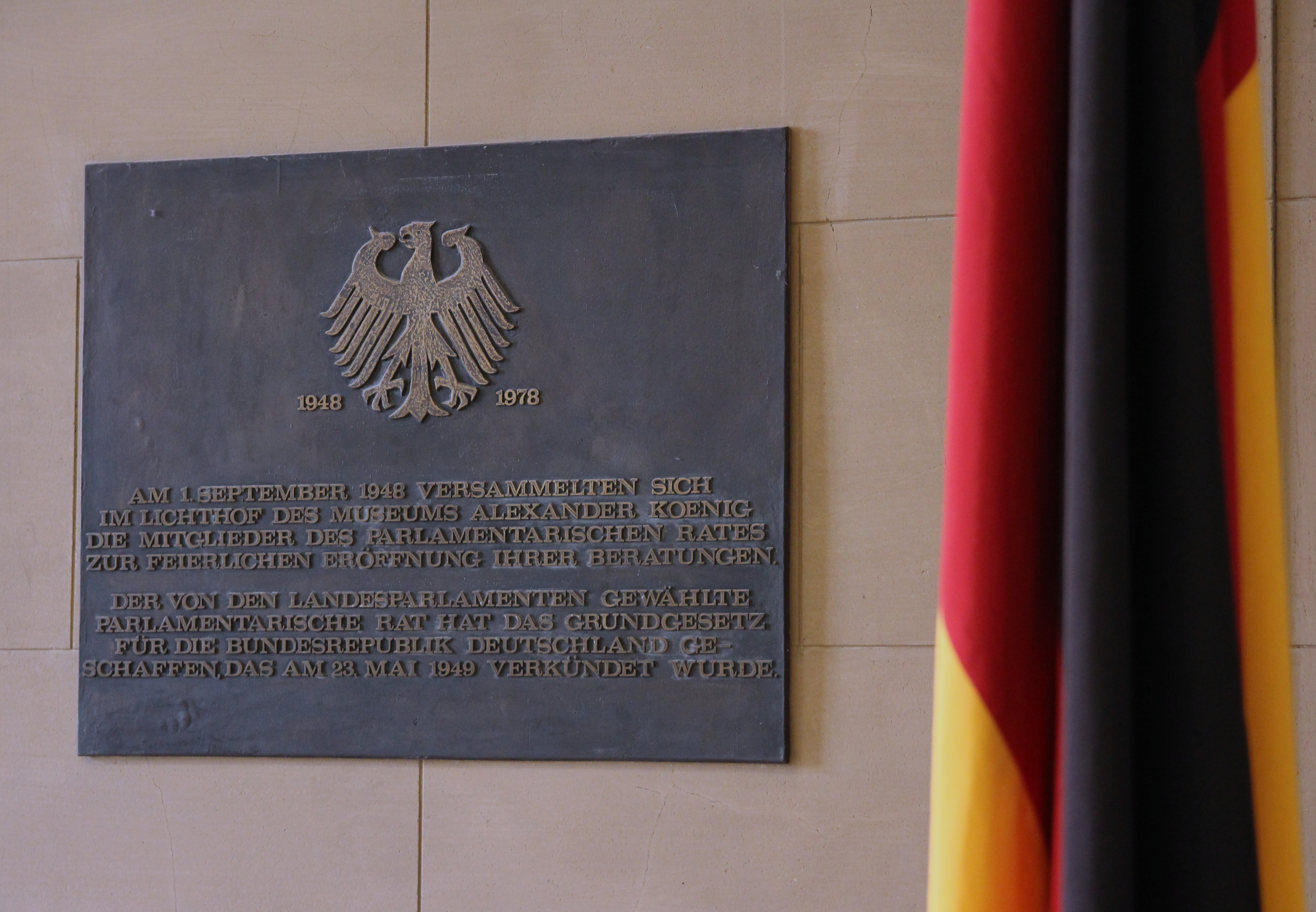
Commemorating plaque for the opening session of the Parlamentarischer Rat, installed in 1978

After his father died in 1903, Alexander Koenig planned a natural history museum to present his private collection to the public. On 3 September 1912, the foundation stone to the new Museum Alexander Koenig was laid. After the outbreak of World War I in 1914, the uncompleted building was confiscated and used as a military hospital and later, until 1923, as barracks by the French occupying forces. Alexander Koenig, who had lost most of his fortune in the aftermath of the war, donated the museum and his private collection to the German government in 1929. The museum finally opened its doors to the public on 13 May 1934.

After World War II the museum building, which was left largely intact by the war, was the only representative and large assembly hall available in Bonn, now capital of West Germany. This was the reason why the museum was used by the Parlamentarischer Rat (English: parliamentary council), for its opening session on 1 September 1948. At this time plans were made to use the museum building as the Chancellor's Office (German: Bundeskanzleramt), but it was eventually only used for two months by the new chancellor Konrad Adenauer in 1949.

On 1 July 2021, the museum was merged with the Museum of Nature Hamburg, formerly Centre of Natural History, abbreviated CeNaK, to form the Leibniz Institute for the Analysis of Biodiversity Change, abbreviated LIB.

== Exhibitions ==
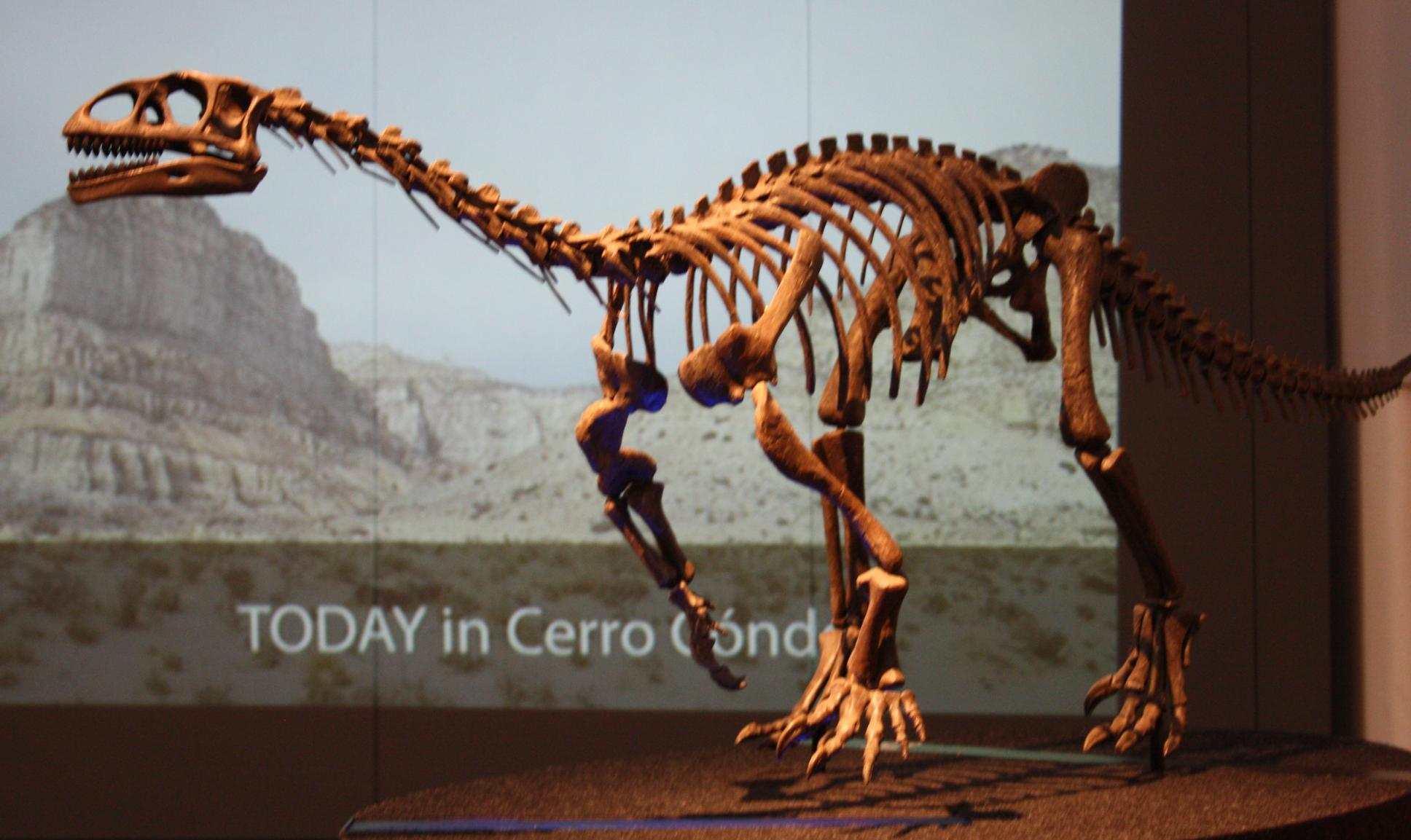
Restored skeleton of Leonerasaurus, photographed at the Museum Koenig during the stay of the special exhibition "DINOSAURIER - Giganten Argentiniens" in 2009

The museum defines its mission as "researching and explaining the diversity of species of Earth". The main exhibition is titled "Unser blauer Planet - Leben im Netzwerk" (Our blue planet – living in a network). It shows complex ecological systems through dioramas of the African Savannah, a tropical rain forests, the polar regions, deserts and Central Europe.

Aside from the permanent exhibition the museum houses special exhibitions regularly.

== Museum complex ==
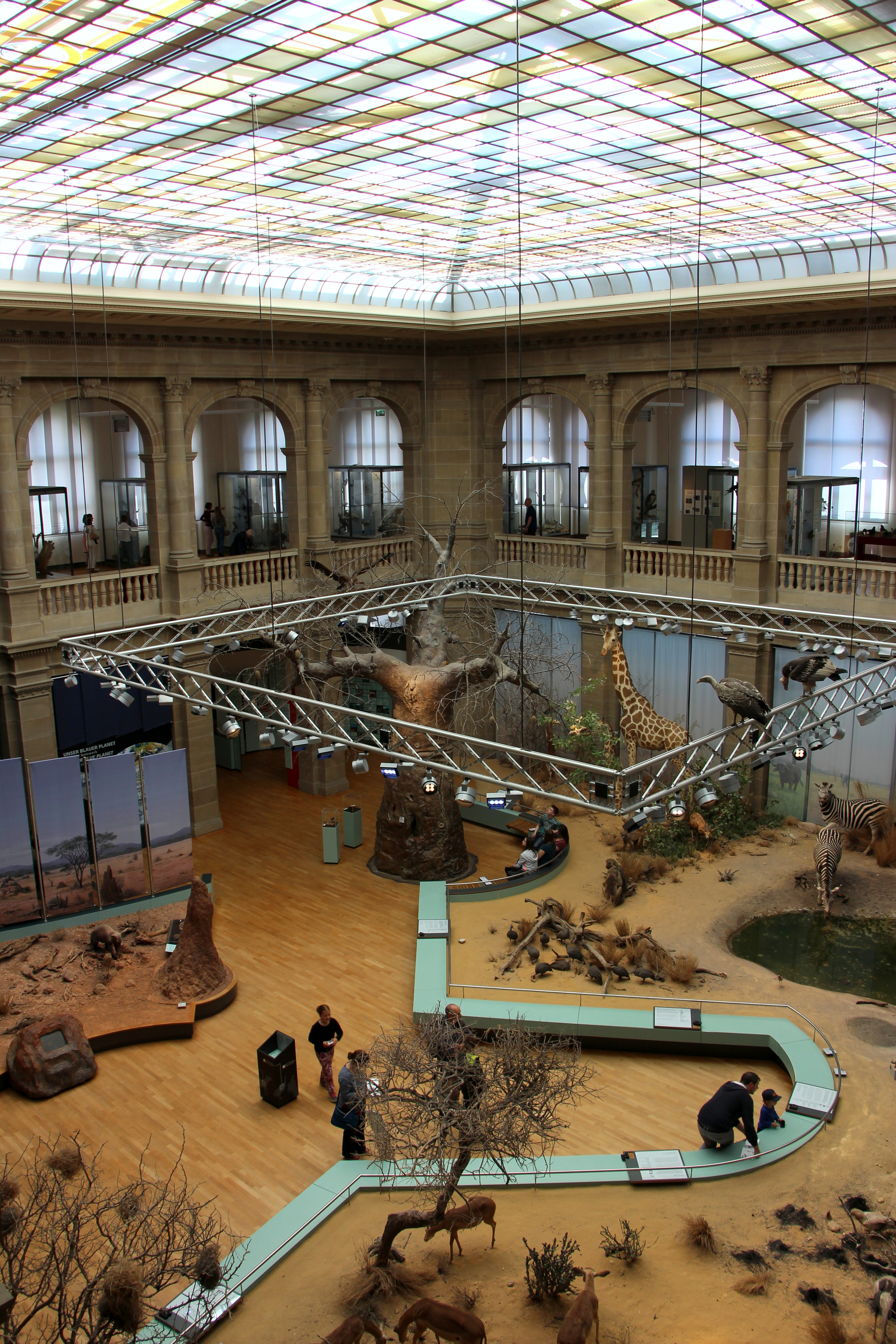
Central hall

Today the Museum Koenig is housed in a complex of several buildings dating from different times and serving different purposes. The building complex includes the main building, the Villa, the Private Museum and the Class M. Naumann Building.

The main building of the Museum Koenig houses the public exhibition and features a large central hall crowned by a glass roof.

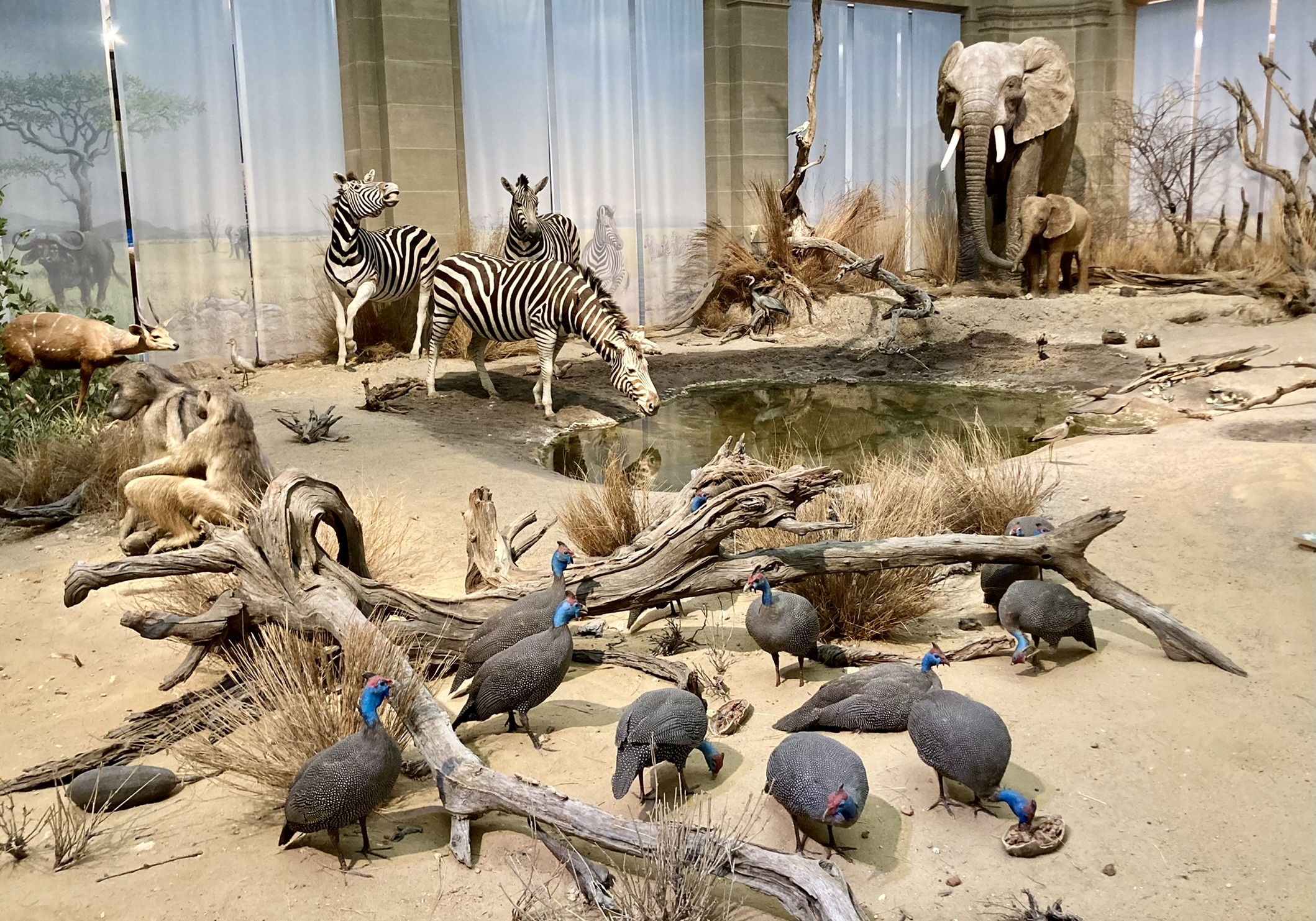
African savannah animals in the central hall

The building was designed by Gustav Holland, who probably modeled the Museum Koenig after the Museum of Natural History in Berlin. Construction began in 1912, but the museum was not opened until 1934 due to World War I.

The Villa is the oldest part of the Museum Koenig and houses the vertebrate department. The building was built in 1860. Leopold Koenig, father of Alexander Koenig purchased the building in 1873. He donated the house to his son in 1884 after Alexander Koenig received his doctoral degree and married Margarethe Westphal. Alexander Koenig used the Villa as his private residence and to house his bird collections. The building was largely destroyed in World War II and rebuilt in a simplified manner in 1949.

The Private Museum is an annex to the Villa, and was built to house the growing private collection of Alexander Koenig. Construction began in 1898 and was completed in 1900. The architect was Otto Penner.

The Clas M. Naumann Building is a modern annex to the main building and was opened in 2006. The building is named after Clas Michael Naumann, professor of zoology at the University of Bonn and former director of the museum. The building houses the arthropod collection, the library and laboratories.

== See also ==
- Hans Edmund Wolters — head of Department of Ornithology, 1973–1980
