= Spirendolol =

Names
- IUPAC name 4-[3-(tert-Butylamino)-2-hydroxypropoxy]spiro[3H-indene-2,1'-cyclohexane]-1-one

Identifiers
CAS Number	65429-87-0
3D model (JSmol)	Interactive image
ChemSpider	62090
PubChem CID	68857
UNII	96789094BR
CompTox Dashboard (EPA)	DTXSID40867154
- InChI: InChI=1S/C21H31NO3/c1-20(2,3)22-13-15(23)14-25-18-9-7-8-16-17(18)12-21(19(16)24)10-5-4-6-11-21/h7-9,15,22-23H,4-6,10-14H2,1-3H3 Key: YLBMSIZZTJEEIO-UHFFFAOYSA-N; InChI=1/C21H31NO3/c1-20(2,3)22-13-15(23)14-25-18-9-7-8-16-17(18)12-21(19(16)24)10-5-4-6-11-21/h7-9,15,22-23H,4-6,10-14H2,1-3H3 Key: YLBMSIZZTJEEIO-UHFFFAOYAB
- SMILES: CC(C)(C)NCC(COC1=CC=CC2=C1CC3(C2=O)CCCCC3)O

Properties
Chemical formula	C_{21}H_{31}NO_{3}
Molar mass	345.483 g·mol^{−1}
- Except where otherwise noted, data are given for materials in their standard state (at 25 °C [77 °F], 100 kPa). Infobox references

Spirendolol is a beta adrenergic receptor antagonist.
