= Samandaridine =

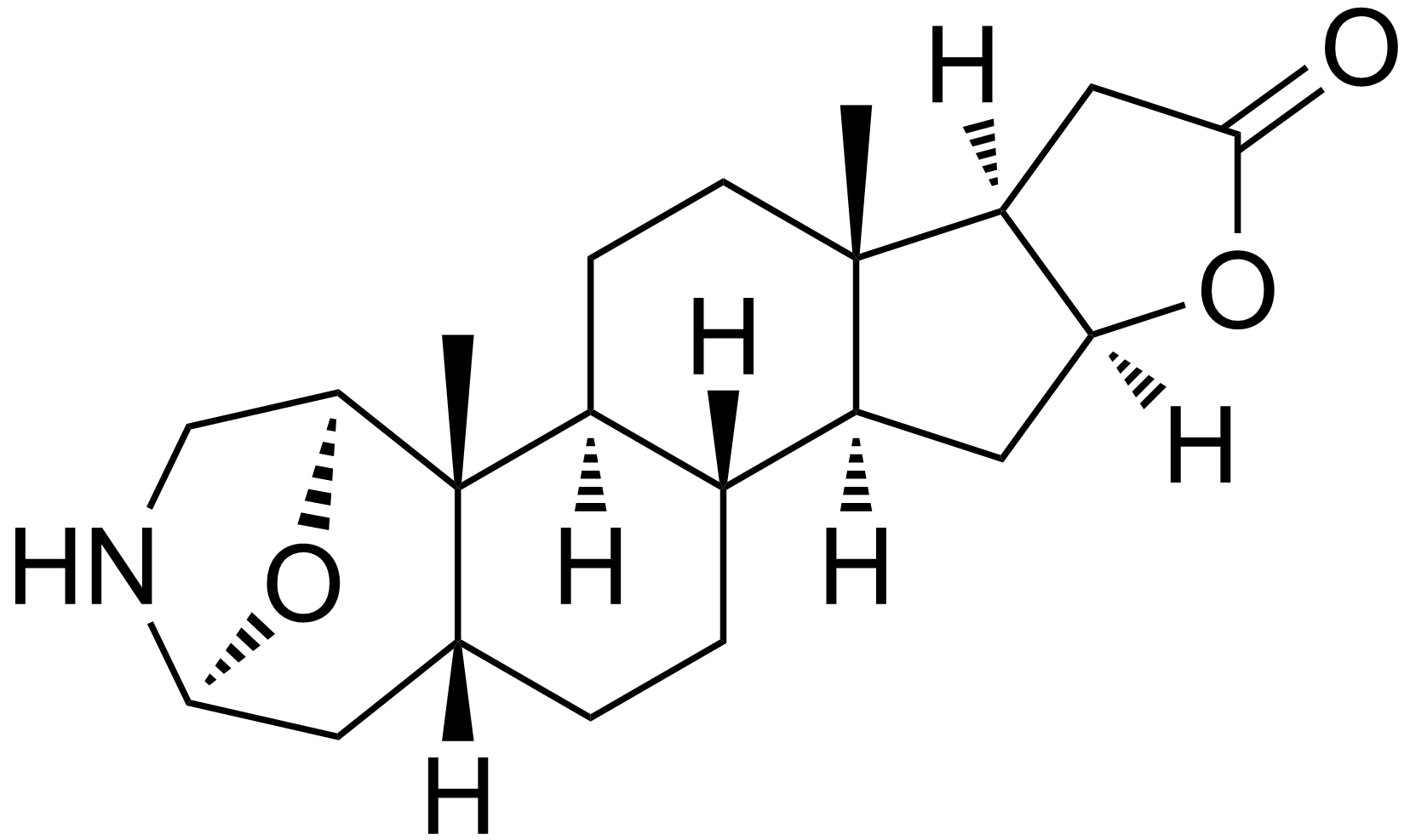

Names
- Preferred IUPAC name (2S,5R,5aS,5bS,7aS,7bR,10aS,11aS,11bS,13aR)-5a,7a-Dimethyloctadecahydro-2,5-epoxyfuro[3′′,2′′:3′,4′]cyclopenta[1′,2′:5,6]naphtho[1,2-d]azepin-9(1H)-one
- Other names Samandaridine; Samandaridin

Identifiers
CAS Number	6384-73-2
3D model (JSmol)	Interactive image
ChemSpider	21106478
PubChem CID	12315225
UNII	WCB49WL3GW
CompTox Dashboard (EPA)	DTXSID80894767
- InChI: InChI=1S/C21H31NO3/c1-20-6-5-13-12(14(20)8-16-15(20)9-19(23)24-16)4-3-11-7-18-22-10-17(25-18)21(11,13)2/h11-18,22H,3-10H2,1-2H3/t11-,12-,13+,14+,15+,16+,17+,18+,20+,21+/m1/s1 Key: GUSZSGSYIVZEDM-MZDLDJOOSA-N; InChI=1S/C21H31NO3/c1-20-6-5-13-12(14(20)8-16-15(20)9-19(23)24-16)4-3-11-7-18-22-10-17(25-18)21(11,13)2/h11-18,22H,3-10H2,1-2H3/t11-,12-,13+,14+,15+,16+,17+,18+,20+,21+/m1/s1 Key: GUSZSGSYIVZEDM-MZDLDJOOBD; Key: GUSZSGSYIVZEDM-MZDLDJOOSA-N
- SMILES: O=C2C[C@@H]3[C@@]4(C)CC[C@@H]1[C@@]5(C)[C@@H]6CN[C@H](C[C@H]5CC[C@H]1[C@@H]4C[C@@H]3O2)O6

Properties
Chemical formula	C_{21}H_{31}NO_{3}
Molar mass	345.483 g·mol^{−1}
- Except where otherwise noted, data are given for materials in their standard state (at 25 °C [77 °F], 100 kPa). verify (what is ?) Infobox references

Samandaridine is an extremely toxic alkaloid produced by the skin glands of various salamanders.

== See also ==
- Samandarin
