= Museum Koenig station =

Railway station in Bonn, Germany

Museum Koenig
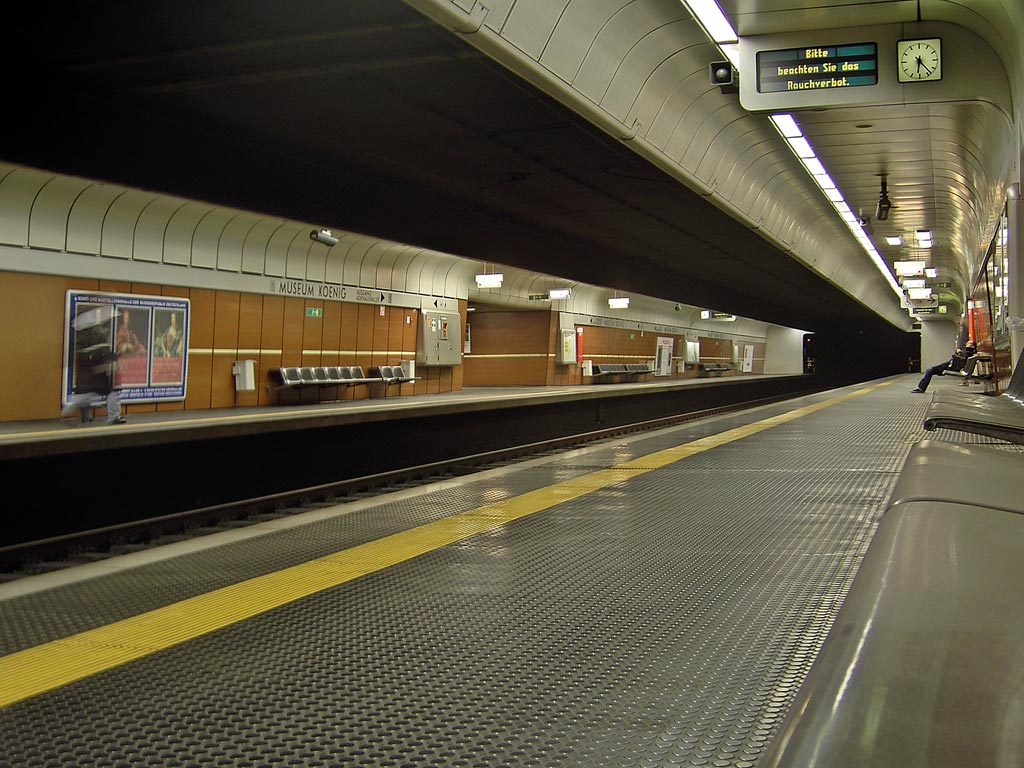
- Museum Koenig station

General information
- Coordinates: 50.7218°N 7.1146°E
- System: Bonn Stadtbahn station
- Platforms: 2 side platforms
- Tracks: 2

Construction
- Structure type: Underground

Other information
- Fare zone: VRS: 2600

Services
Preceding station	Bonn Stadtbahn	Following station
Bundesrechnungshof towards Niehl Sebastianstraße	Line 16	Heussallee towards Bad Godesberg Stadthalle
Bundesrechnungshof towards Tannenbusch Mitte	Line 63	Heussallee towards Bad Godesberg Stadthalle
Bundesrechnungshof towards Siegburg/Bonn	Line 67	Heussallee towards Bad Godesberg Stadthalle
Bundesrechnungshof towards Siegburg/Bonn	Line 66	Heussallee towards Bad Honnef
Bundesrechnungshof towards Bornheim	Line 68	Heussallee towards Ramersdorf
Location

Museum Koenig is a station on the Bonn Stadtbahn located in Bonn Südstadt, Germany. This station is served by all lines (except line 18 and the tramway system).
