= Küdinghoven station =

Railway station in Bonn, Germany

Küdinghoven
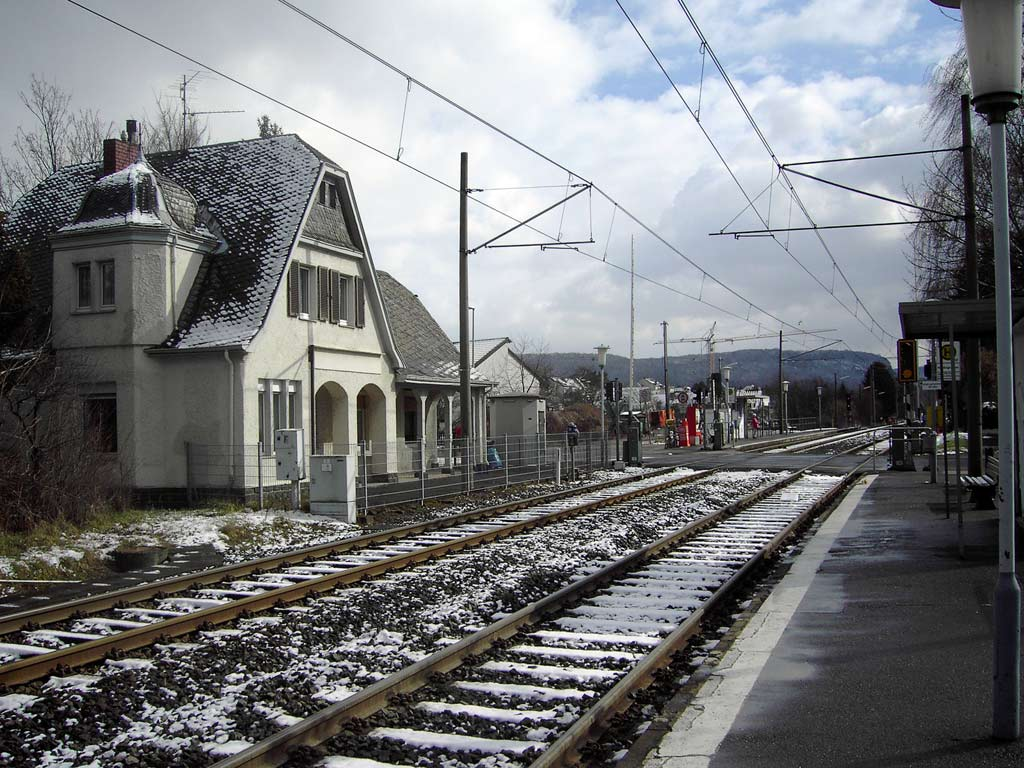
- The station platforms in 2006

General information
- Location: Bonn, North Rhine-Westphalia; Germany
- Coordinates: 50°43′41″N 7°08′31″E
- Owner: Stadtwerke Bonn
- Platforms: 2 side platforms
- Tracks: 2
- Train operators: Stadtwerke Bonn

Services
Preceding station	Straßenbahn Bonn	Following station
Limperich towards Dottendorf	Line 62	Schießbergweg towards Oberkassel Süd/Römlinghoven
Limperich towards Kopenhagener Straße	Line 65	Schießbergweg towards Ramersdorf
Location

Küdinghoven is a Bonn Stadtbahn (tram) stop served by lines 62 and 65, in Bonn, Germany.
