= Schießbergweg station =

Schießbergweg
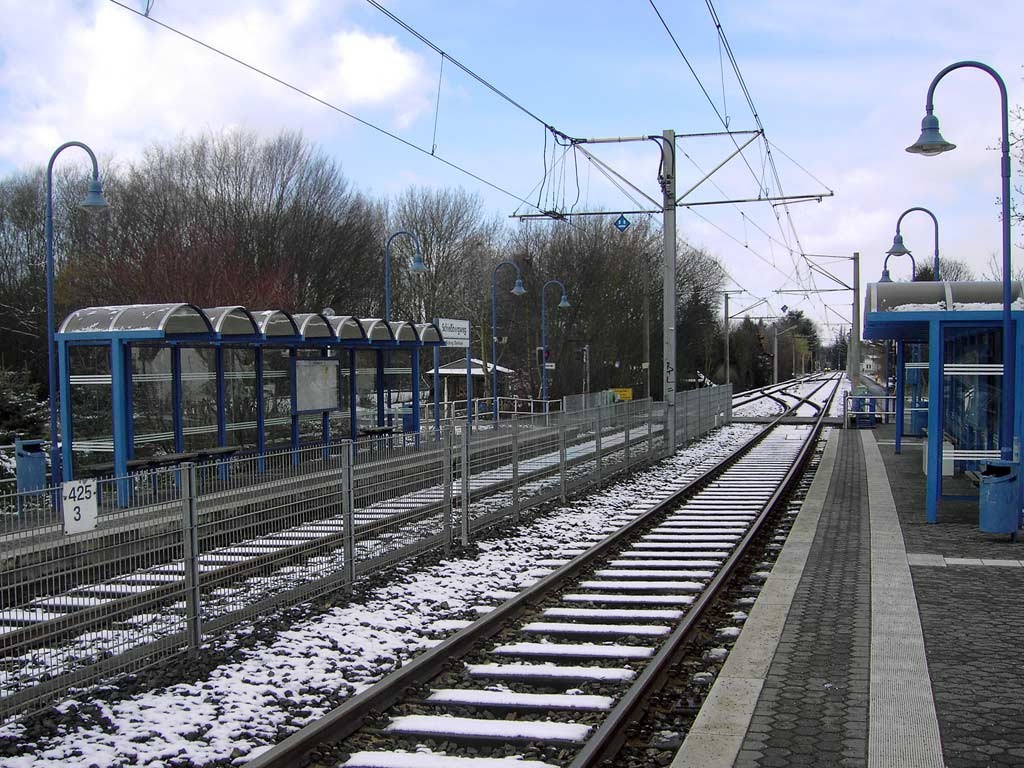
- The station platforms in 2006

General information
- Location: Beuel, North Rhine-Westphalia; Germany
- Coordinates: 50°43′34″N 7°08′49″E
- Owner: Stadtwerke Bonn
- Platforms: 2 side platforms
- Tracks: 2
- Train operators: Stadtwerke Bonn

History
- Opened: 12 January 1996

Services
Preceding station	Straßenbahn Bonn	Following station
Küdinghoven towards Dottendorf	Line 62	Ramersdorf towards Oberkassel Süd/Römlinghoven
Küdinghoven towards Kopenhagener Straße	Line 65	Ramersdorf Terminus
Location

Schießbergweg is a Bonn Stadtbahn (tram) stop served by lines 62 and 65. The station opened on 12 January 1996.
