= Oberkassel Nord station =

Oberkassel Nord
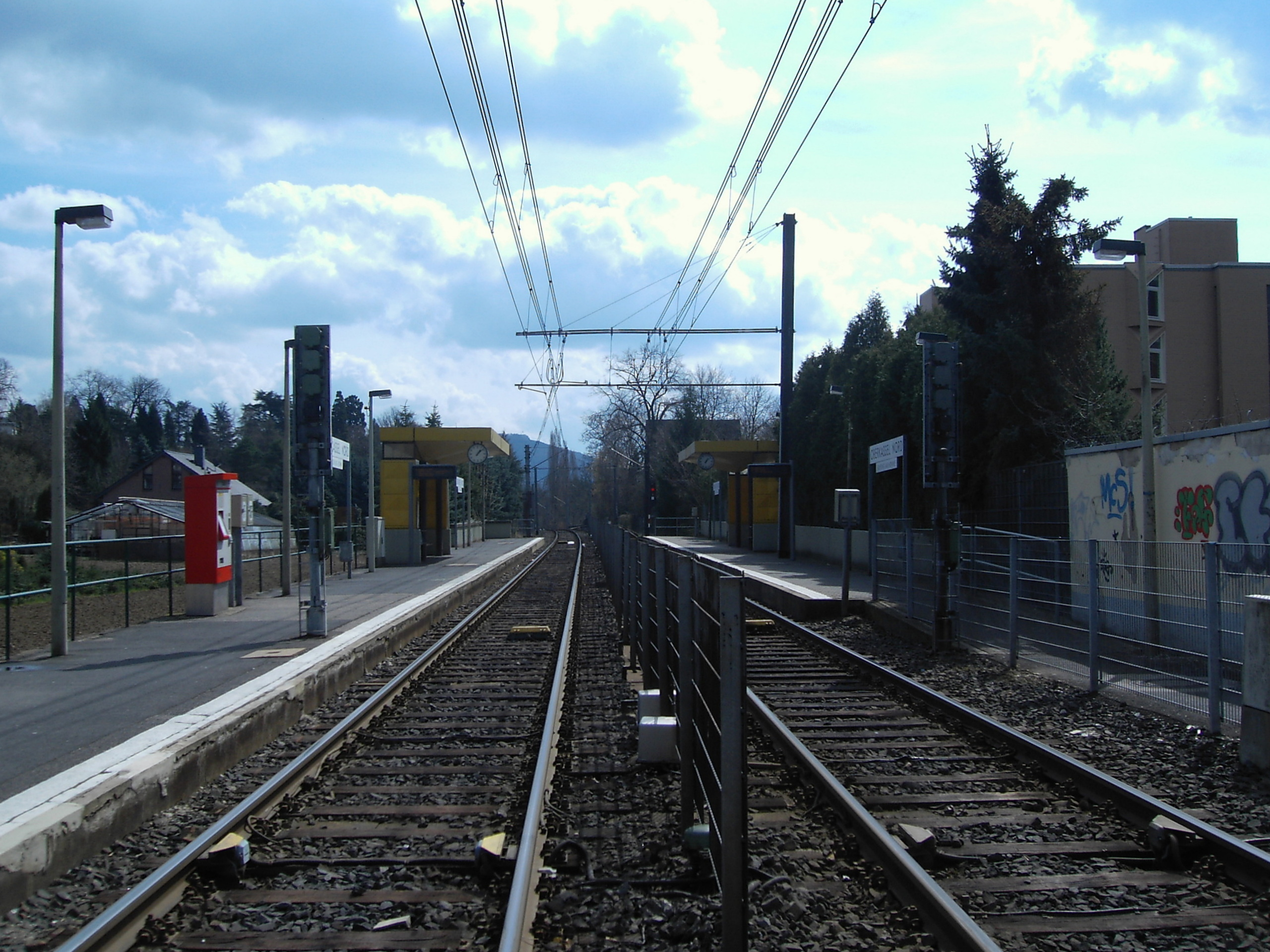

General information
- System: Bonn Stadtbahn station
- Platforms: 2 side platforms
- Tracks: 2

Construction
- Structure type: At grade

Other information
- Fare zone: VRS: 2600

Services
| Preceding station | Straßenbahn Bonn | Following station |
|---|---|---|
| Ramersdorf towards Dottendorf | Line 62 | Oberkassel Mitte towards Oberkassel Süd/Römlinghoven |
| Preceding station | Bonn Stadtbahn | Following station |
| Ramersdorf towards Siegburg/Bonn | Line 66 | Oberkassel Mitte towards Bad Honnef |
Location

Oberkassel Nord is a station served by line 66 of the Bonn Stadtbahn and line 62 of Bonn's tram system. This station consists of two tracks with two side platforms. The Bonn-Oberkassel station is about 450 meters away.
