= Oberkassel, Bonn =

Quarter of Bonn, Germany

Coordinates: 50°42′50″N 7°10′0″E

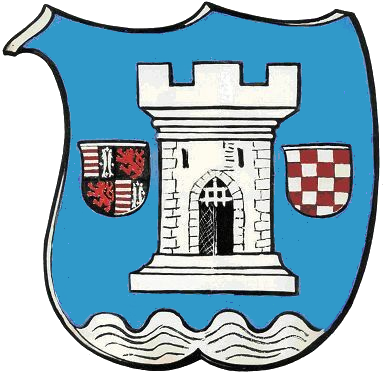
Oberkassel coat of arms

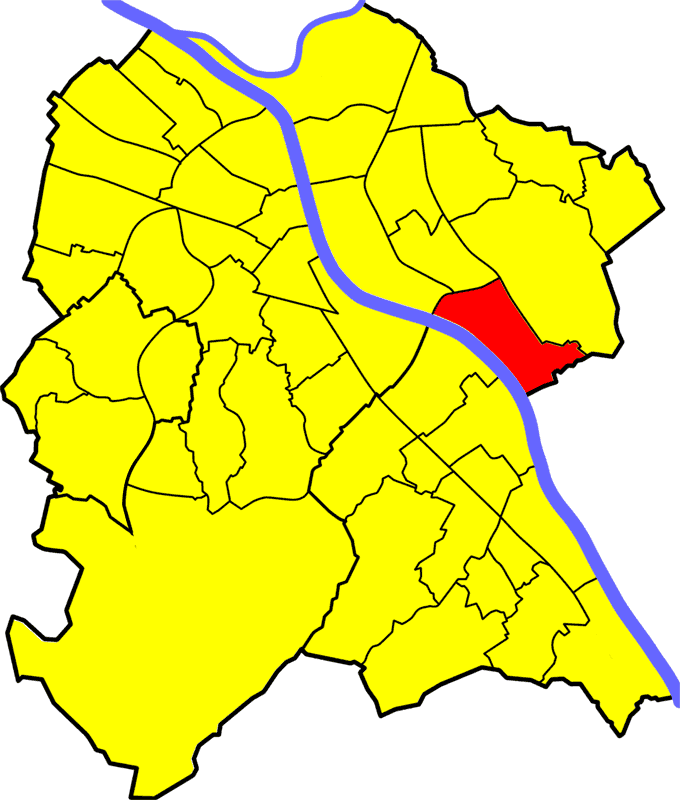
Statistical district of Oberkassel in Bonn

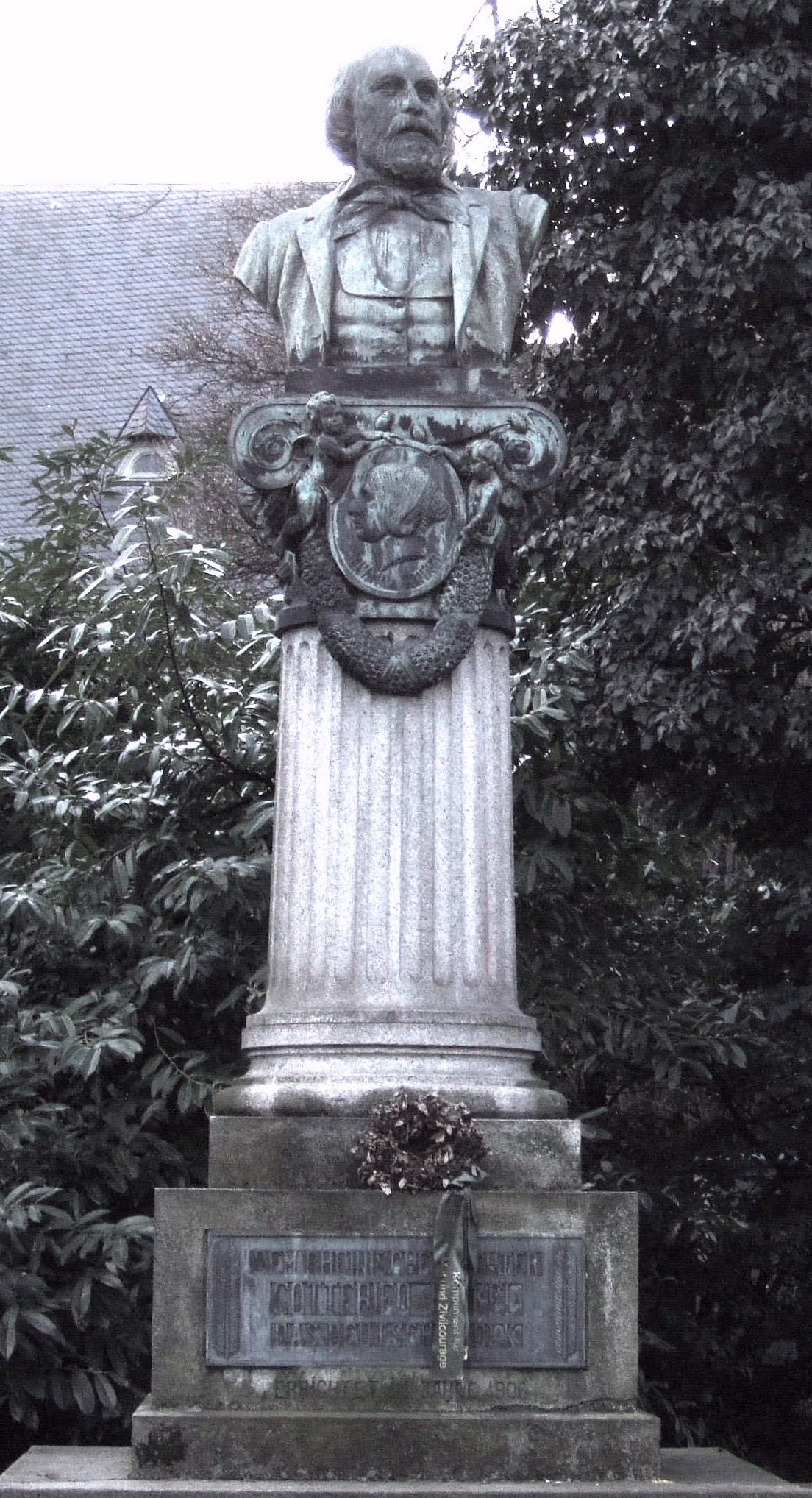
Gottfried Kinkel memorial

Oberkassel is a suburb in the Bonn municipal district of Beuel in Germany. It lies on the right bank of the Rhine on the edge of the Siebengebirge mountains. Oberkassel has about 7,200 inhabitants.

== History ==
Oberkassel was first mentioned as Cassele in 722/723 and as Cassela in 1144. The name Oberkassel refers to a Roman fortification; in the course of time "Römerkastell" (Roman castle) became "Oberkassel". Oberkassel absorbed the previously separate settlements of Berghoven (mentioned for the first time in 873), Büchel (mentioned for the first time in 1202), Broich (mentioned for the first time in 1306) and Meerhausen (mentioned for the first time in 1442).

In 1870 the East Rhine Railway reached Oberkassel and crossed the Rhine by train ferry to the West Rhine Railway. The train ferry was abandoned in 1919.

In 1914, workers in a quarry detected a grave with a 50-year-old man, a 20-25-year-old woman and a dog, which came to be called the Bonn–Oberkassel dog. Carbon-14 datings estimated an age between 13,300 and 14,000 years. A study of the mitochondrial genome sequences in 2013 showed that the animal is indeed Canis lupus familiaris, not a wolf.

== Transport ==
Bonn-Oberkassel station is on the East Rhine Railway.

The Bonn Stadtbahn (city rail of Bonn) with its lines 62 and 66 serves three stations in Oberkassel: Oberkassel Nord (SWB), Oberkassel Mitte and Oberkassel Süd/Römlinghoven.

The Bundesstrasse 42 (federal highway 42) traverses the south-eastern part of Oberkassel within a 500 m (1,600 ft) long tunnel. It has an exit near Ramersdorf.

== Economy ==
Oberkassel is home of several divisions of the DLR, the German Aerospace Center.

== Bonn-Oberkassel double burial ==
Oberkassel D999 and D998 (Ok1 and 2) are a set of Mesolithic human skeletons discovered from 14,000 and 13,000 years old deposits in a quarry. Jelinek et al. (1969) grouped these crania with Cro-Magnon under the name Homo sapiens fossilis alongside Vestonice, Brno, and Predmosti. Typically, they are assigned to Homo sapiens, although a statue at Oberkassel is labeled as "Homo obercasseliensis" and they were historically considered "close" to Neanderthals. The two individuals comprise a male and female, dog bones, and two bone and antler artworks. Being a Mesolithic double burial with domesticated dogs makes the site especially important.

=== Discovery ===
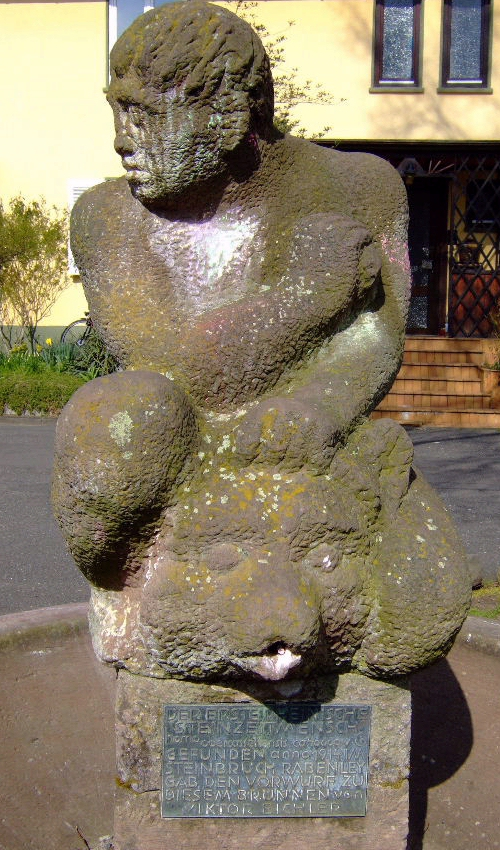
"Homo obercasseliensis" statue at the discovery location

The burial was discovered in the quarry "Am Stingenberg", a popular basalt deposit where the double burial was discovered 99 m in a rubble dump near the base of a cliff. The initial report includes the burial and grave goods, a canine tooth, a reindeer, and a "bovid tooth" in a reddish layer with traces of charcoal. Future human finds at the site are not impossible. It was determined that the site was a place of burial and not storage, and that the hunters lived nearby in an overhang under the basalt wall. This would have provided a close location to bury their dead, but the isolated status of the double burial suggests that they did not like to lay their dead in their settlements. The graves themselves were decorated in a large amount of red pigment and with careful stone arrangement.

A dating given by Oxford in 1994 suggests an age of 12–11.35 ka, a conclusion also reached by the LVR-Amt für Bodendenkmalpflege im Rheinland (Rhenish Office for the Preservation of Archaeological Monuments) through soil samples. In 2014, the 100th anniversary of the find, genetics determined that the individuals were not as related as siblings and may be potentially helpful for Out-Of-Africa. They discovered a meaty diet with freshwater fish and mussels, as well as plant gathering. They both grew up in different locations based on enamel isotopes. They ate closely related seeds from northern Scandinavia during childhood, suggesting that it served as a refugium for hunters. The woman had given birth at least once, and the man survived a fracture to the right ulna, and an injury to the left parietal that may have been an accident or a projectile, such as a slingshot.

=== Skulls ===
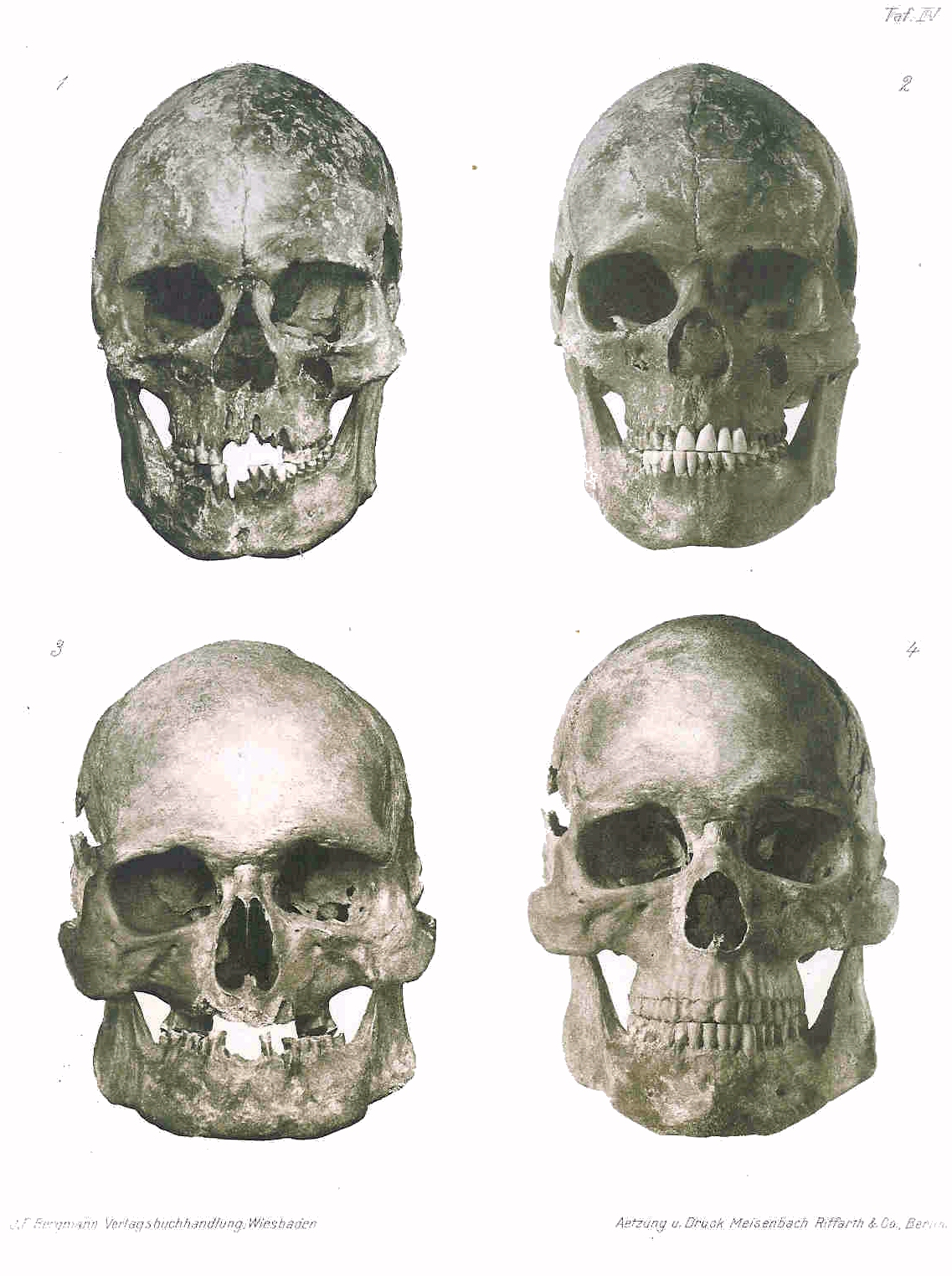
Fossil (left) and reconstruction (right) of the woman (top) and man (bottom) from Oberkassel

The skull of the woman is notable in having disintegrated sutures leading to mispositioning of the nasals and temporals as well as defects to the cranial base. It is 184 mm long, 129 mm in width, and 135 mm in height. The jaw apparatus is very well developed, the forehead is wider, the chin is strong, and the square orbits are large. The third right upper molar was missing in life and the molars bear less wear indicating a sooner eruption time, but otherwise the dentition was complete. The body of the woman was first suggested to be 1.55 m (~5'1 f) tall and 20 years old, but current estimates suggest 1.6-1.63 m (~5'2-5'3 f) in height and 25 years in age. The man was first considered strange because of the facial breadth and robusticity (assuming these traits are unique to Neanderthals). The male skull is 193 mm long, 144 mm wide, and 138 mm high. This individual was around 40–50 years of age, only retaining the final two molars (which sat at an incline) and an upper canine. The exposed dentin is black and the enamel is greatly worn on all remaining teeth, and the teeth not accounted for were all lost during life. Original height calculations suggested great physical strength and a stature of 1.6 m (~5'2 f), but current calculations recover 1.67-1.68 m (~5'4-5'5 f). The man exhibits massiveness characteristic of Upper Paleolithic people and also seen in Neanderthals.

=== Classification ===
Robert Bonnet initially attempted classification of the Oberkassel burial, finding resemblance to the Neanderthals in the skull of the man and resemblance to the Cro-Magnon humans through the narrow nose, sloped rectangular orbits, angled mandible, pronounced chin, and low, long face. He suggested that this population was subject to introgression, as evidenced by the morphology of each individual. Josef Szombathy (1920) first classified these hominins solely with Cro-Magnons, although recent research agrees that humans of this time were much more uniform than early racial classification suggests. Winfried Henke, who considers these specimens very important, investigated the burial in 1986 and especially focused on craniometric comparisons. He found "typical" European morphology, characterizing the man as "averagely robust" and the woman as "hyper-feminine type". Henke considered Oberkassel "decisive" as an ancestral role.

=== Archaeogenetics ===
The two Oberkassel specimens (c. 14 kya) represent the earliest yet found evidence for Western Hunter-Gatherer ancestry (WHG). The Oberkassel ancestry was found to be also close to the Gravettian Arene Candide 16 genome. The observed maternal haplogroups are U5, while the Y-chromosome of the male specimen belongs to a subclade of I-M170.

=== Objects ===
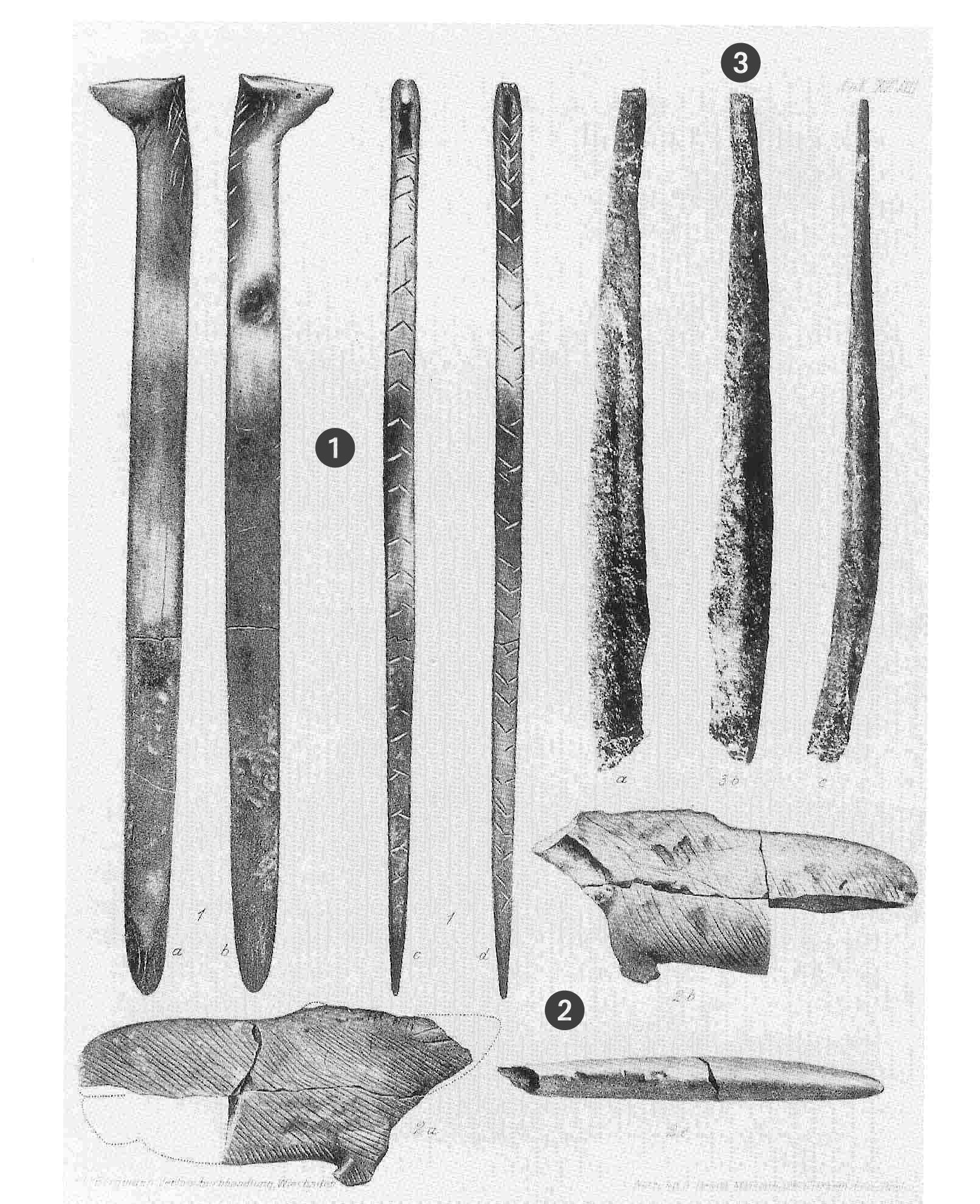
Various cultural items at Oberkassel.

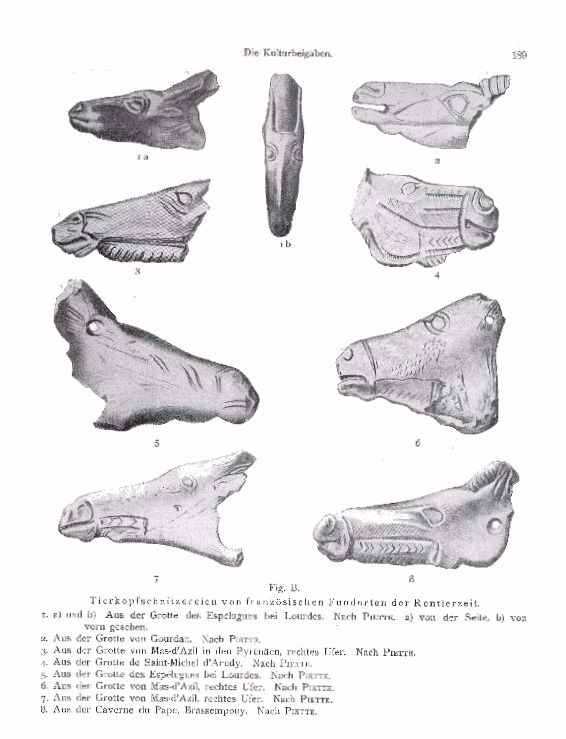
The animal sculpture or possible antler.

In 1914, grave goods were recorded from the burial and considered important to defining the cultural stage of the population. Franz Heiderich discovered an "animal" or "horse" head after quarry workers noted a "hair arrow" (initially thought to be a hairpin). Made from antler, the animal head is a flat plate 8.5 cm long, 1 cm thick, and 3.4–4 cm wide and outlines the body, limbs, and head. The rear likely broke during excavation but it has not since been recovered. The piece was likely carved out of a larger material and engraved on both sides, identification as an antler is also possible. most notably with hatching to denote the stomach and neck. It is assumed to be an elk, similar to those of the Magdalenian found in France and England, and a probable part of the Federmesser culture; it was not wearable. Also found was one of the oldest animal staffs. Verworn misinterpreted the sculpture as a Magdalenian cut-out and as such assigned to Magdalenian IV, which was proven incorrect by radiocarbon dating and stylistic elements. Verworn correctly described an "unworked awl-shaped animal bone", which was created with the baculum of what is likely a brown bear.

=== Fauna ===
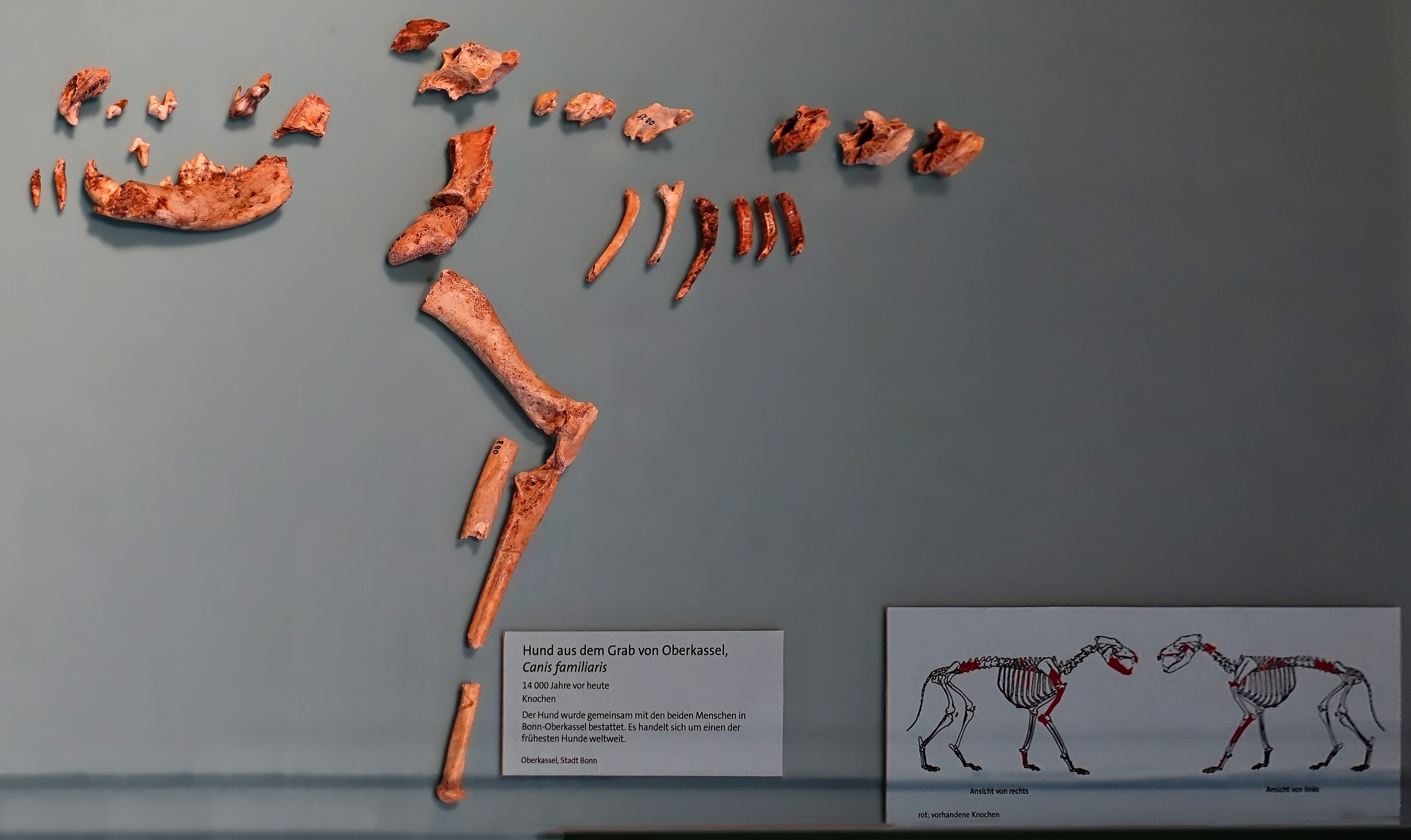
Dog skeleton from the burial

The domestic dog presence at the site is the oldest undisputed record of this canine in the fossil record. Günter Nobis (1986) published a report on the local animals at the burial, revising Steinmann (1919). Some of the original fauna include domestic dogs, the brown bear, red deer, and aurochs/steppe bison (the bovines being too fragmentary to cement an identification). Nobis erroneously suggested a lynx and roe deer, but they may be dog remains instead. Previously, the dog remains were suggested to be wolf. This specimen was one in a data pool that concluded that the species was domesticated 32-18 ka.

== Notable residents ==
- Gottfried Kinkel, * August 11, 1815 in Oberkassel, † 13 November 1882, poet also noted for his revolutionary activities
- Ernest, Count of Lippe-Biesterfeld, * 9 June 1842 in Oberkassel, † 26 September 1904, head of the Lippe-Biesterfeld line of the House of Lippe, regent of the Principality of Lippe

== Gallery ==
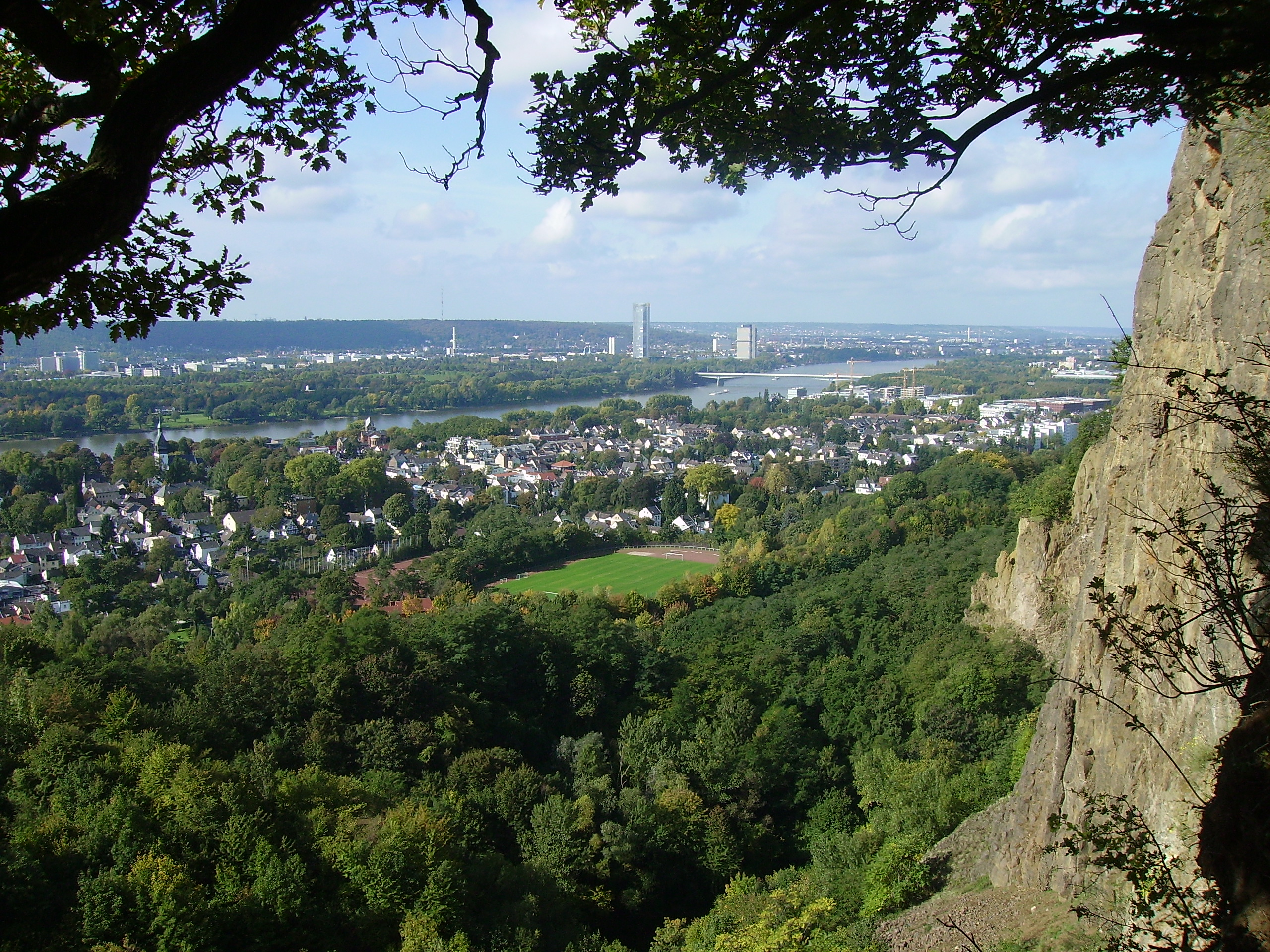
Oberkassel seen from its abandonend quarry – in background, on the other side of the Rhine, Bad Godesberg and Bonn

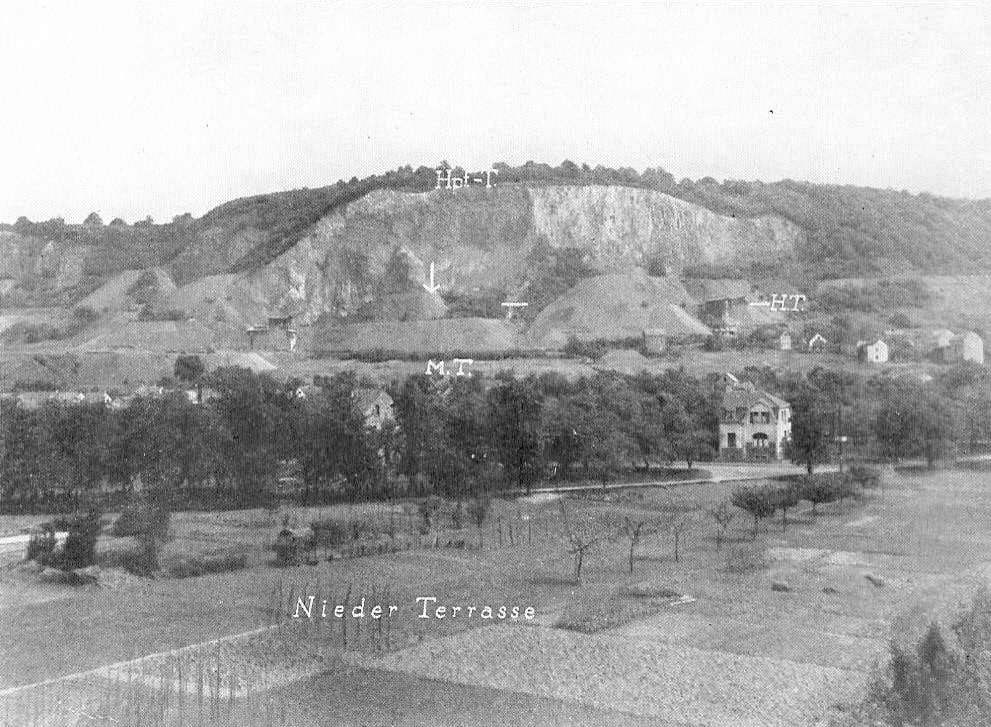
Historic photo, the place where the grave is found is marked by an arrow
