= Oberkassel Mitte station =

Oberkassel Mitte
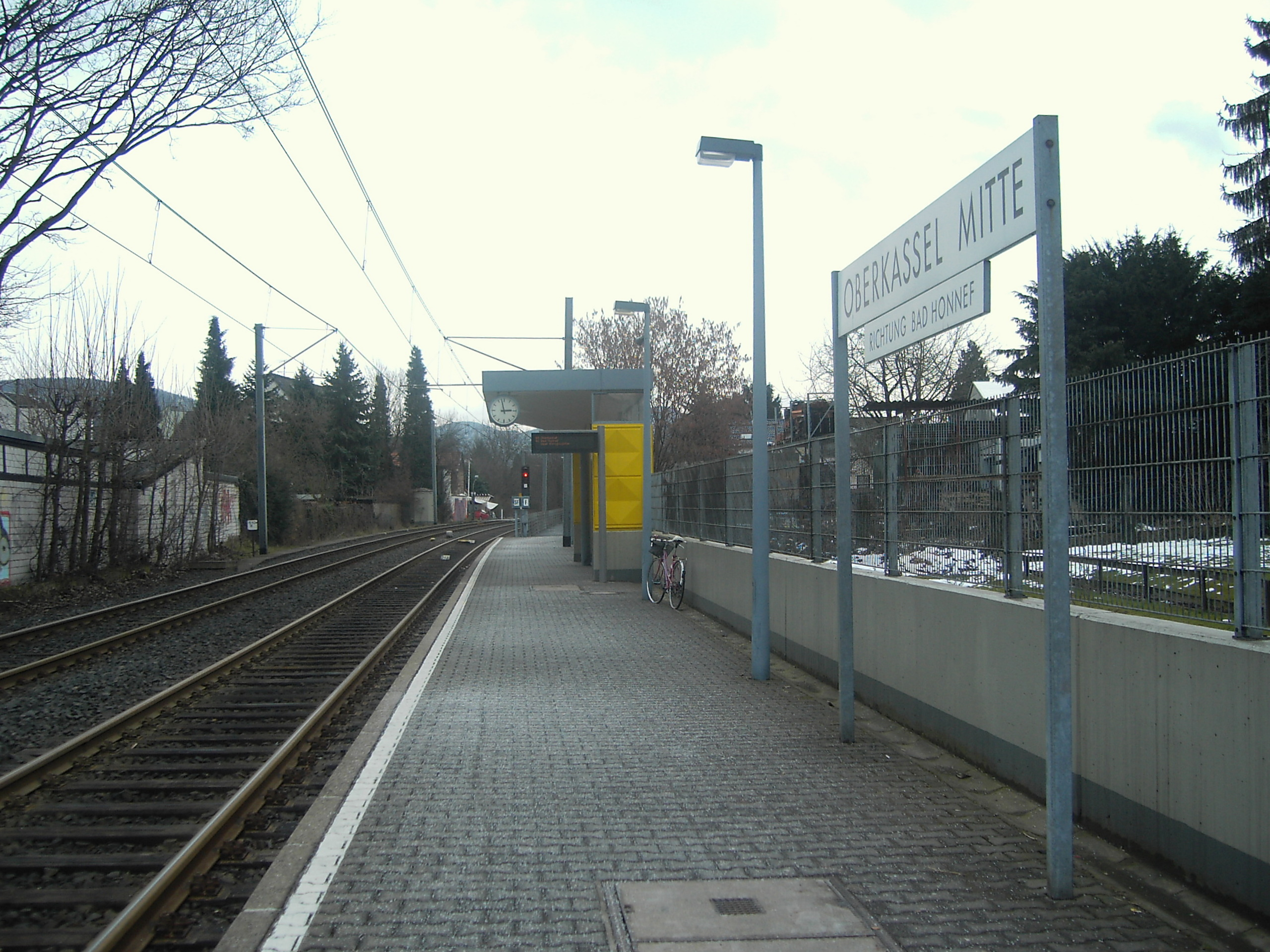

General information
- System: Bonn Stadtbahn station
- Platforms: 2 side platforms
- Tracks: 2

Construction
- Structure type: At grade

Other information
- Fare zone: VRS: 2600

Services
Preceding station	Straßenbahn Bonn	Following station
Oberkassel Nord towards Dottendorf	Line 62	Oberkassel Süd/Römlinghoven Terminus
Preceding station	Bonn Stadtbahn	Following station
Oberkassel Nord towards Siegburg/Bonn	Line 66	Oberkassel Süd/Römlinghoven towards Bad Honnef
Location

Oberkassel Mitte is a Bonn Stadtbahn station served by lines 62 and 66. It is located in the suburb Oberkassel.
