= German Commission for UNESCO =

Coordinates: 50°43′54.24″N 7°5′37.73″E

The German Commission for UNESCO is one of 195 National Commissions for UNESCO worldwide, a unique structure in the UN system, foreseen by UNESCO's constitution of 1946. The German Commission was founded on May 12, 1950, one year before West Germany was officially admitted to UNESCO. It has a liaison function for German Multilateral Foreign Cultural Policy; thus, its regular budget is financed by the Foreign Office. It is a chartered non-profit voluntary association with up to 114 members: Its members represent the German Federal government and the governments of the Laender, representatives of important German institutions working within UNESCO's fields of competence as well as individual experts.

The German Commission for UNESCO advises the government, parliament and all other public bodies on UNESCO issues, as well as on other issues of multilateral policy in education, culture and science. It coordinates the contribution of German government, academia, expert institutions and civil society to UNESCO’s programme activities: Education, Natural and Social Sciences, Culture, Communication and Information. Notable activities are the international volunteer service "kulturweit" (partnered with the German Academic Exchange Service, the German Archaeological Institute, the Goethe-Institut, the DW Akademie, the Pädagogischer Austauschdienst, the Central Agency for German Schools Abroad and the Initiative „Schulen: Partner der Zukunft“), the German implementation of the UN decade on "Education for Sustainable Development", the German implementation of the UNESCO convention on cultural diversity and a cooperation framework with Africa.

The Secretariat with about 45 staff members is located in Bonn and Berlin. Since 2002, the President is Walter Hirche and since 2004, the Secretary-General is Dr. Roland Bernecker. The Bureau and the executive committee of the German Commission for UNESCO are elected for two years, by a general assembly meeting once annually.

== UNESCO National Commissions ==
UNESCO was founded in 1946 as the United Nations Specialized Organization for Education, Science and Culture. Within its fields of competence, UNESCO will "contribute to peace and security by promoting collaboration among the nations through education, science and culture". It is the only UN Organization having National Commissions. All 193 member states of UNESCO dispose of a National Commission, with varying structures and architecture. All of them have similar tasks though: they involve the educational, scientific, and cultural communities as well as communication media of their countries into the planning, implementation, communication and evaluation of the multi-faceted programmes of UNESCO.

== Germany's membership in UNESCO ==
In 1951, UNESCO was among the first of the United Nations Specialized Agencies in which the Federal Republic of Germany became a Member State, thus ending Germany's intellectual isolation provoked by the Nazi Regime 1933 to 1945. By joining UNESCO in 1972, the GDR also became a Member State, actually for the first time in a UN Organization. Since German unification on October 3, 1990, Germany is used as official name; the German Commission for UNESCO integrated the functions of the dissolved GDR National Commission.

After the United States of America and Japan, Germany makes the third largest financial contribution to UNESCO. Like most other Member States, Germany has a Permanent Delegation to UNESCO in Paris. It ensures constant working contact with UNESCO and is in charge of Germany's political relations with UNESCO.

Germany is participating very actively in UNESCO's programmes. There are more than 30 World Heritage Sites in Germany, 15 UNESCO biosphere reserves, some 200 UNESCO Associated Schools, 10 UNESCO chairs, 10 UNESCO clubs and national committees for the IHP, MAB, the IOC, the IGCP, the MoW Programme, and the UN Decade on Education for Sustainable Development.

== Activities ==
In 1972, it organized German-Polish Textbook Commission with its counterpart of Poland.
