= Gottfried Kinkel =

German poet (1815–1882)

Johann Gottfried Kinkel
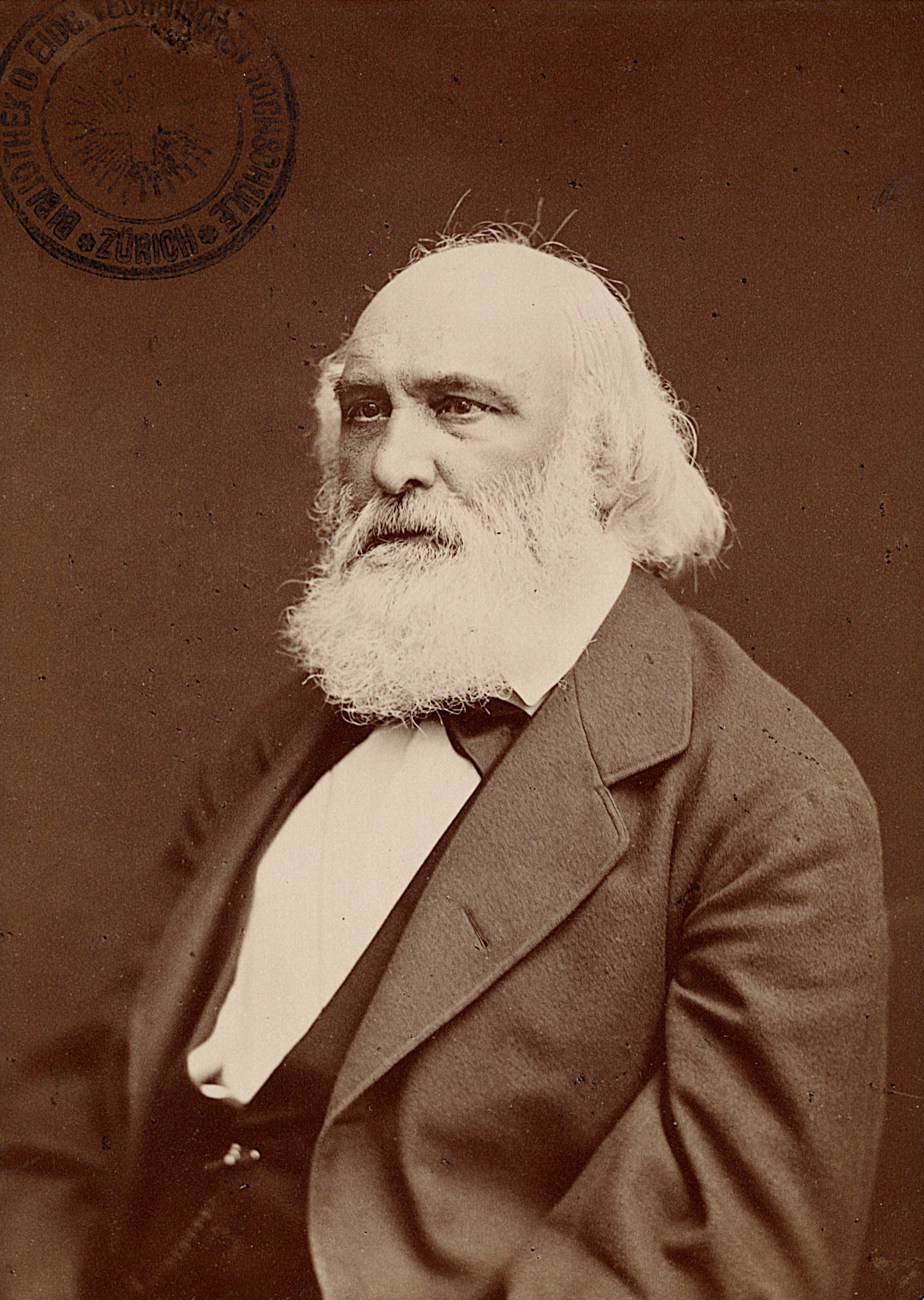
- Gottfried Kinkel, 1880
- Born: 11 August 1815; Obercassel
- Died: 13 November 1882 (aged 67); Zürich
- Education: University of Bonn, University of Berlin
- Occupations: professor, journalist
- Writing career
- Notable works: Otto der Schütz (Otto the marksman), Der Grobschmied von Antwerpen (The Blacksmith of Antwerp), Geschichte der bildenden Künste bei den christlichen Völkern (History of art among the Christians)

Johann Gottfried Kinkel (11 August 1815 – 13 November 1882) was a German poet also noted for his revolutionary activities and his escape from a Prussian prison in Spandau with the help of his friend Carl Schurz.

== Early life ==
He was born at Oberkassel (now part of Bonn). Having studied theology at Bonn and Berlin, he established himself at Bonn in 1836 as a Privatdozent, or theology tutor, became master at the secondary school there, and was for a short time assistant preacher in Cologne.

Changing his religious opinions, he abandoned theology and delivered lectures on the history of art, in which he had become interested on a journey to Italy in 1837. In 1843, he married Johanna Mockel (1810–1858), a writer, composer and musician who assisted her husband in his literary work and revolutionary activities. They had four children. In 1846 he was appointed extraordinary professor of the history of art at the University of Bonn.

== Revolutionary ==
In 1848, with his wife and Carl Schurz, he started a newspaper, the Bonner Zeitung, mostly devoted to following revolutionary activities, but also providing the traditional material such as musical and theatrical reviews that people expected then from a full-service newspaper.

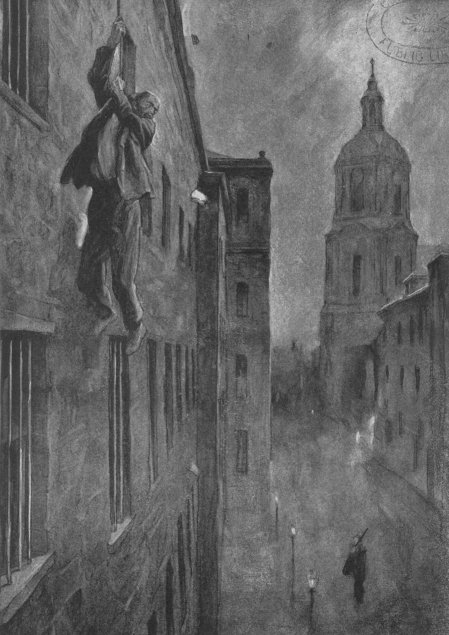
Drawing recreating Kinkel's escape from Spandau

Kinkel joined the armed rebellion in the Palatinate in 1849, believing himself to be acting legally in obedience to the directives of the Frankfurt Parliament. In a battle he was wounded and arrested and later sentenced to life imprisonment. Although the authorities originally sentenced him to be incarcerated in a fortress where he would have been able to pursue some semblance of his professional activities, Friedrich Wilhelm IV of Prussia found this sentence to be illegal since he was not sentenced to death and "graciously" commuted it to lifetime imprisonment in a reformatory where his head was shaved, and he had to wear prisoner's garb and spend his time spinning wool. He was eventually transferred to Spandau Prison in Berlin, where his friend and former student Carl Schurz helped him escape the prison at Spandau and reach London, England in November 1850.

== Exile ==
=== London ===
In London, he joined the Communist League. Later he became involved with the August Willich-Karl Schapper group within the League and came out against Karl Marx and Frederick Engels in the split within the Communist League.

Kinkel visited the United States to raise funds for a "German National Loan" that was to fund revolutionary activities in Germany. Although he was enthusiastically received, and met with President Millard Fillmore, he raised very little money.

Returning to London in 1853, he taught German and public speaking for women, and lectured on German literature, art, and the history of culture. In 1858, he founded the German paper, Hermann. Johanna Kinkel lost her life in late 1858 when she fell or threw herself out of a window. In 1860, Kinkel married Minna Emilia Ida Werner, a Königsberger who was living in London. In 1863, he was appointed examiner at the University of London and other schools in England.

=== Switzerland ===
In 1866 he accepted a professorship of archaeology and the history of art at the Polytechnikum in Zürich, where he died 16 years later. He was never able to return to Germany. The 1920 Encyclopedia Americana speculates that it was probably his love of his native country that brought him to Zürich.

== Writings ==
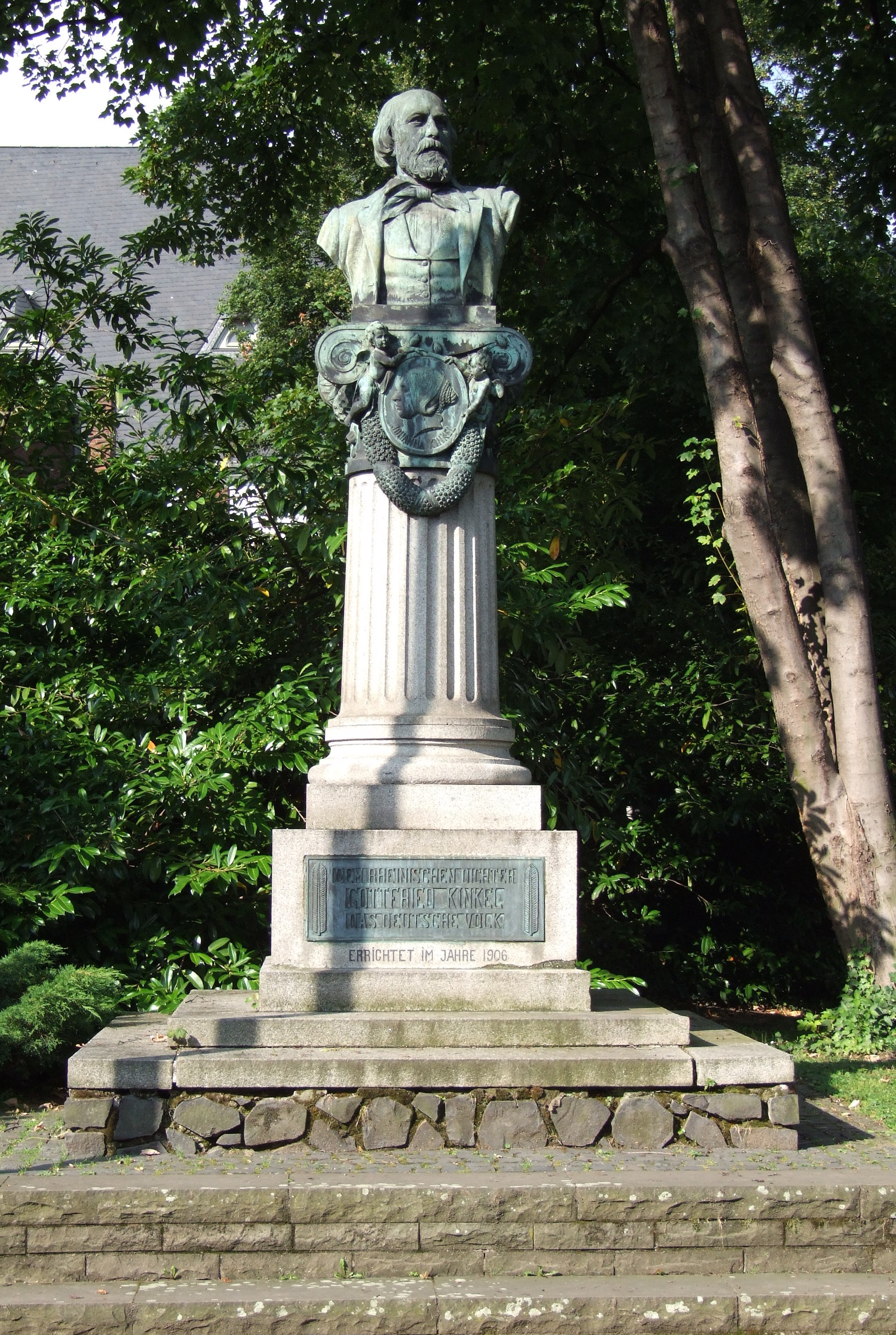
Memorial in Bonn-Oberkassel (1906)

In the estimation of the Encyclopædia Britannica Eleventh Edition (1911), Kinkel's popularity was out of proportion to his talent. Britannica characterized his poetry as of the sweetly sentimental type in vogue in Germany in the mid-19th century.

Kinkel's Gedichte first appeared in 1843, and went through several editions. His best works were the verse romances, Otto der Schütz, eine rheinische Geschichte in zwölf Abenteuern (1846), which by 1920 had gone through over 100 editions, and Der Grobschmied von Antwerpen (1868). Among his other works were the tragedy Nimrod (1857), and Geschichte der bildenden Künste bei den christlichen Völkern (A history of visual arts among Christians, 1845), Die Ahr: Landschaft, Geschichte und Volksleben (Landscape, history and life of the people along the Ahr, 1845), and Mosaik zur Kunstgeschichte (1876).

== Media ==
Kinkel's escape from Spandau is briefly dramatized in the third part ("Little Germanies") of Engstfeld Film's four-part series Germans in America (2006).
