= Foreign-language assistant =

Native speaker assisting in language lessons

A foreign language assistant (FLA) is an assistant teacher, usually a native speaker, assisting a teacher of modern foreign languages in another country in lessons about the native language of the assistant.

The programs are meant to be of benefit for both assistants and pupils. It should help to improve the foreign language skills of the pupils on the one hand and is, on the other hand, an opportunity for the assistants to deepen their language skills and their cultural knowledge, as well as a chance to get an insight into a different educational system.

In Germany, the responsible institution behind the FLA program is the Educational Exchange Service (Pädagogischer Austauschdienst), which is a governmental institution of the ministers of education of the federal states in Germany that organises and arranges international exchange programs in education on behalf of the federal states.

== Duties ==
A foreign language assistant either assists teachers in their language lessons or teaches small groups on his/her own. Foreign language assistants work a maximum of twelve hours per week, mainly in secondary schools. Tasks vary and include conversation exercises like roleplays, providing sources and interesting information for cultural studies lessons, and rehearsing exam situations. The duration of stay is usually eight to nine months.

== See also ==
- Assistant Language Teacher
