= Kultusministerkonferenz =

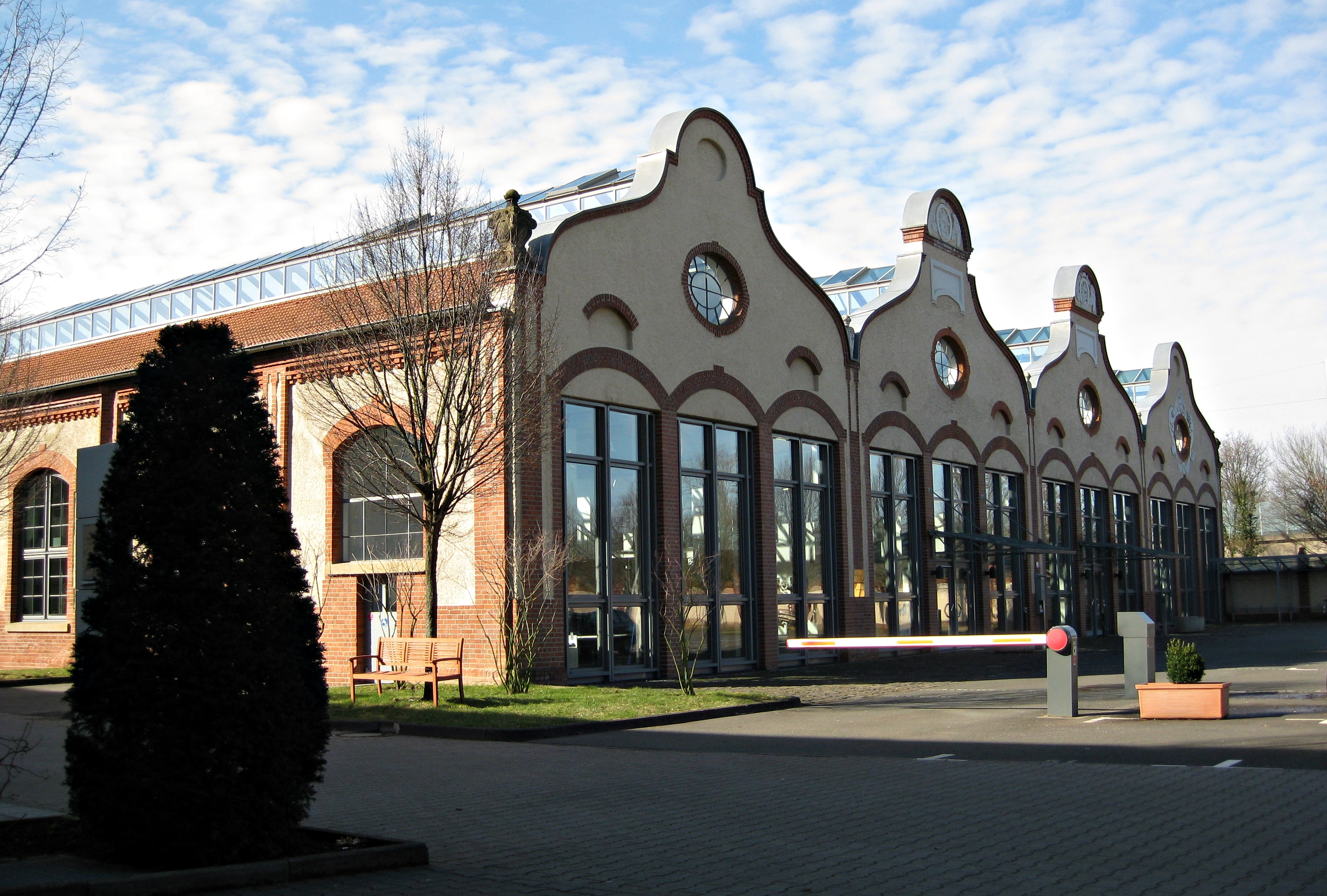
The former tram depot that has housed the KMK's offices in Bonn since 2010

The Kultusministerkonferenz (German: [ˈkʊltʊsminɪstɐkɔnfeˌʁɛnt͡s], literally conference of ministers of education) is the assembly of ministers of education of the German states. The body is not part of the federal government, and its directives do not immediately become effective, but first will have to be turned into state law.

The full title of the Kultusministerkonferenz is Ständige Konferenz der Kultusminister der Länder in der Bundesrepublik Deutschland ("The Standing Conference of the Ministers of Education and Cultural Affairs of the Länder in the Federal Republic of Germany"), but it is usually called the Kultusministerkonferenz, abbreviated KMK. The assembly was founded in 1948 under the name Konferenz der deutschen Erziehungsminister (literally "Conference of German ministers of education"), before the foundation of the German postwar republics.

Today it is the voluntary assembly of the appointed state ministers of education and research. Funded by the states there are a number of KMK offices and committees - there are currently 220 positions based on finance of 50 Million Euro. There are three main branches of "Schulausschuss" (school formation committee for primary and secondary education), "Hochschulausschuss" (academic formation committee for universities and tertiary education) and "Kulturausschuss" (cultural aspects committee for media and arts). These are subdivided into 16 subcommittees and a number of working groups. Furthermore, five commissioner offices are funded being the "Amtschef-Kommission Qualitätssicherung in Schulen" (commissioner office for quality control in school formation), "Amtschef-Kommission Qualitätssicherung in Hochschulen" (commissioner office for quality control in academic formation), "Kommission für Europäische und Internationale Angelegenheiten" (commissioner office for European and international affairs), "Kommission für Statistik" (commissioner office for statistics) and "Kommission Sport" (commissioner office for sports).

The KMK is special in the way that there is no federal legislation for education in Germany, as the Basic Law does not give power to the Federacy to legislate on the matter (thus creating effectually a Kulturhoheit der Länder or cultural sovereignty of the states). Other voluntary state conferences are paralleled on the federal level like the Innenministerkonferenz (the assembly of ministers for police and security - executive branch) and Justizministerkonferenz (the assembly of ministers for justice - judicial branch) where federal law overrules state law. The KMK state directives however will overrule federal regulations which makes for the importance of the Kultusministerkonferenz in the political system of Germany - in most cases the federal minister for education will place joint committees with the KMK where the created law to take the form of a Staatsvertrag (state treaty) passed by the state governments.

In the course of the Förderalismusreform (reform of the responsibilities between federal government and state länder) in the years 2003 to 2006 the structure of the Kultusministerkonferenz was under dispute as well. This led the state of Lower Saxony to leave the Kultusministerkonferenz in September 2004 coming back to the KMK in December 2004 after resolutions that had led to lower the funding of the KMK offices by 20%. However, in the last years the KMK was given extra funding to support PISA studies and the reform of the academic system in the Bologna process.

== See also ==
- German orthography reform of 1996 – legal status
- Rundfunkstaatsvertrag on regulations for television and news
- Educational accreditation in Germany and Wissenschaftsrat
- Pädagogischer Austauschdienst, a student and teacher exchange service attached to the KMK
