= Bonn tram depot =

Protected Art Nouveau building in Germany

Coordinates: 50.751734°N 7.088724°E

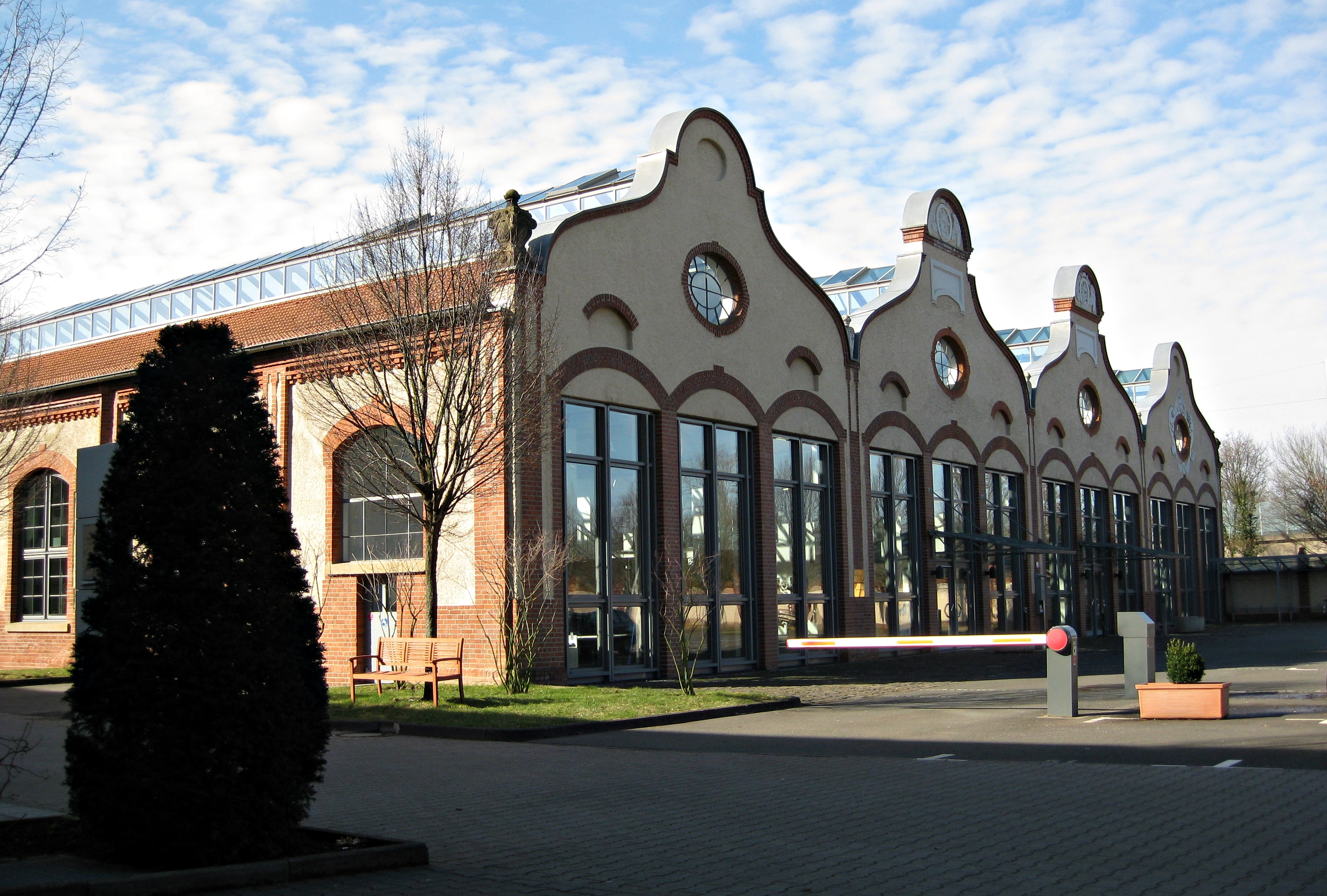
Façade of the former tram depot. The original twelve entry gates are nowadays glazed.

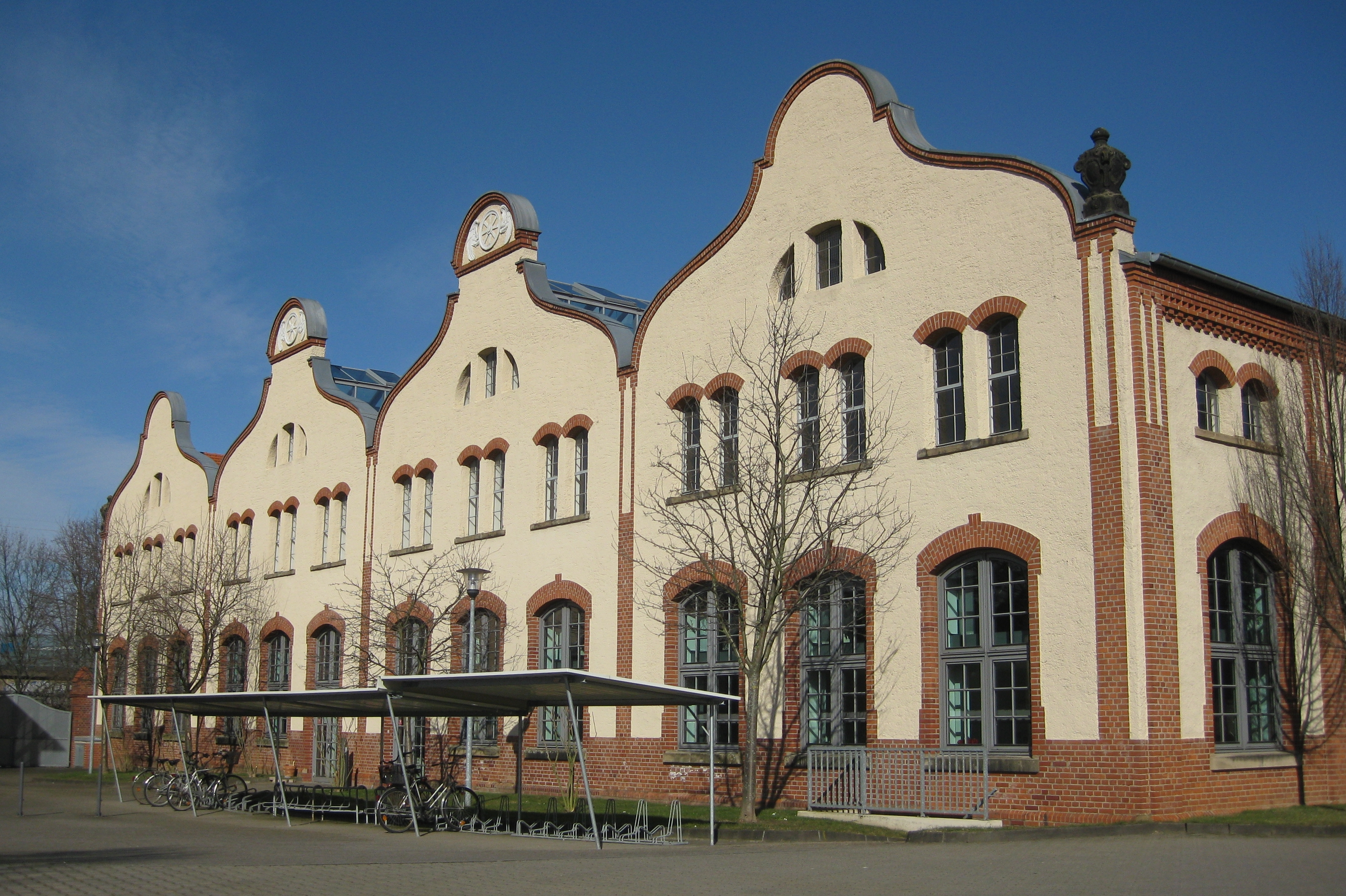
The far end of the building, which was remodelled in 2000; picture taken in 2015

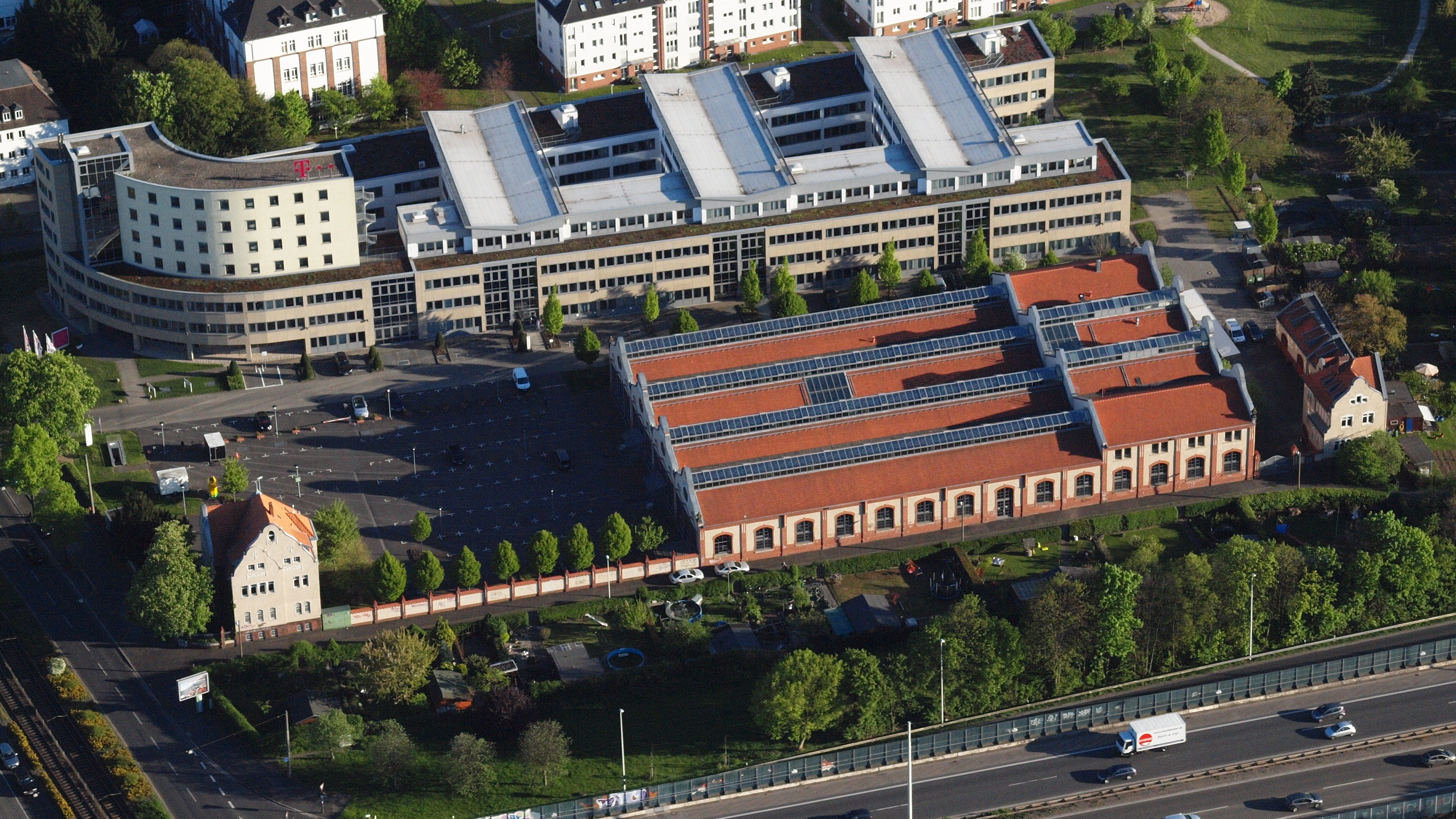
The depot between an office building (seat of the Deutsche Telekom Foundation, Graurheindorfer Straße 153) and Bundesautobahn 565. Left, on the grounds of the former depot stands the historical "director's villa"; over what is now the carpark ran the tram tracks, with cobblestones recreating those visually.

The former City of Bonn tram depot (Straßenbahndepot der Stadt Bonn) stands at Graurheindorfer Straße 157 in Bonn's constituent community of Bonn-Castell. For its time, it is an important example of industrial Art Nouveau architecture, is legally protected and since 2000 has been used as an office building. Housed in the old tram depot is the Pädagogischer Austauschdienst, a section of the Kultusministerkonferenz secretariat that took up residence there in 2010.

== History ==
In 1905, the City of Bonn had the tram depot (Wagenhalle) built, along with a "director's villa" and a carriage shed consisting of a caretaker's building and two horse stalls, to plans from the underground construction office; the chosen site was on the street that was then known as Rheindorfer Straße. The great tram depot, which was to serve as a place for tram maintenance and repair, was built in the Art Nouveau style of architecture. Even the lesser details of the whole were done in Art Nouveau. The four-halled building was given a row of something rather like rendered clock gables, four each at the front and the back, with the two middle ones being built somewhat higher and with semicircular projections on top, which were stuccoed and showed images with technological motifs. The roof sits on triangular steel girder frames. The whole hall is furnished with bricked corners, lintels, intrados and brick ornaments. The windows feature curvilinear elements that are typical of Art Nouveau.

About the beginning of the 1970s, the hitherto twelve elegant gates with segmental arches on the façade were replaced with four big rectangular entrances with rollup doors. In 1986, work at the depot came to an end, and the building stood empty until 2000. In 1993, Stadtwerke Bonn GmbH sold the complex for eight million marks to the Simon Grundbesitzgesellschaft. Once it had been determined that the property was contaminated land, there ensued a three-year legal dispute, which ended in 1997 with a settlement: the buyer was reimbursed 3.5 million marks. In April 1999, the then DaimlerChrysler daughter company debis AG acquired the facility to redevelop it. The work restored the depot's façade to its former appearance with its twelve separate gates, although now only four could be used as entrances. Both the front and back were given a coat of light beige paint. The office space in the hall, which was built to modern requirements, and in agreement with the authorities responsible for monumental protection, comprises some 4,620 square metres (including traffic and functional areas). Beginning in late 2000, it was DeTeImmobilien to whom the office was let. On the ground floor, an artists' atelier was set up. Since October 2010, the secretariat of the Kultusministerkonferenz has been in the building.

== See also ==
- List of protected buildings in Bonn's constituent community of Bonn-Castell (in German)
