= ETwinning =

Online community for schools

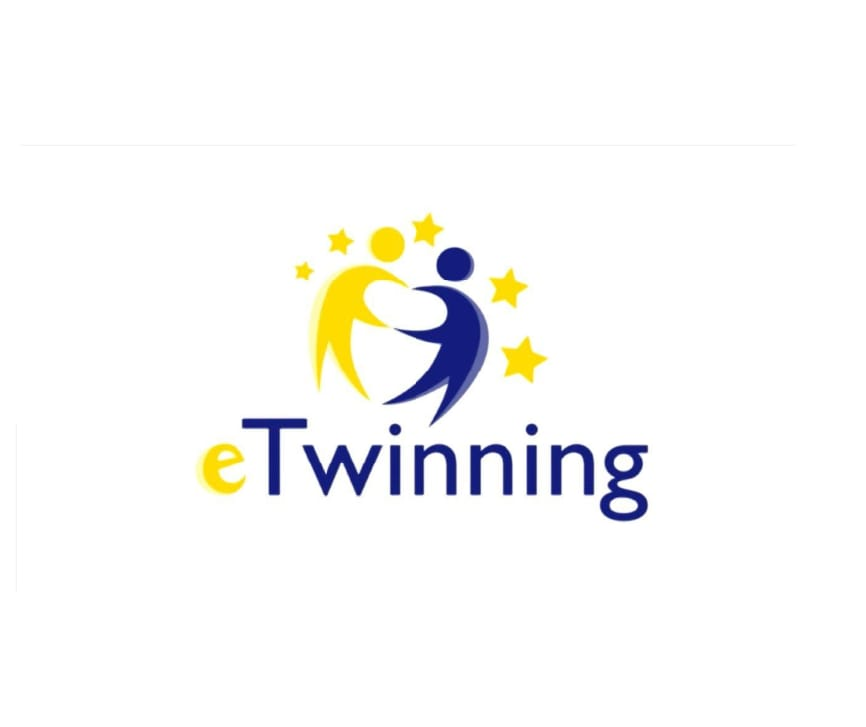
eTwinning logo

The eTwinning action is an initiative of the European Commission that aims to encourage European schools to collaborate using Information and Communication Technologies (ICT) by providing the necessary infrastructure (online tools, services, support). Teachers registered in the eTwinning action are enabled to form partnerships and develop collaborative, pedagogical school projects in any subject area with the sole requirements to employ ICT to develop their project and collaborate with teachers from other European countries.

== Formation ==
The project was founded in 2005 under the European Union's e-Learning program and it has been integrated in the Lifelong Learning program since 2007. eTwinning is part of Erasmus+, the EU program for education, training, and youth.

== History ==
The eTwinning action was launched in January 2005. Its main objectives complied with the decision by the Barcelona European Council in March 2002 to promote school twinning as an opportunity for all students to learn and practice ICT skills and to promote awareness of the multicultural European model of society.

More than 13,000 schools were involved in eTwinning within its first year. In 2008, over 50,000 teachers and 4,000 projects have been registered, while a new eTwinning platform was launched. As of January 2018, over 70,000 projects are running in classrooms across Europe. By 2021, more than 226,000 schools in taken part in this work.

In early 2009, the eTwinning motto changed from "School partnerships in Europe" to "The community for schools in Europe".

In 2022, eTwinning moved to a new platform.

== Participating countries ==
Member States of the European Union are part of eTwinning: Austria, Belgium, Bulgaria, Croatia, Cyprus, Czech Republic, Denmark, Estonia, Finland, France, Germany, Greece, Hungary, Ireland, Italy, Latvia, Lithuania, Luxembourg, Malta, Poland, Portugal, Romania, Slovakia, Slovenia, Spain, Sweden and The Netherlands. Overseas territories and countries are also eligible. In addition, Albania, Bosnia and Herzegovina, North Macedonia, Iceland, Liechtenstein, Norway, Serbia and Turkey can also take part.

Seven countries from the European neighbourhood (including Armenia, Azerbaijan, Lebanon, Georgia, Moldova and Ukraine) are also part of eTwinning via the eTwinning Plus scheme, as well as countries which are part of the Eastern Partnership, and Tunisia and Jordan (which are part of the Euro-Mediterranean Partnership, EUROMED).

== Operation ==
The main concept behind eTwinning is that schools are paired with another school elsewhere in Europe and they collaboratively develop a project, also known as eTwinning project. The two schools then communicate online (for example, by e-mail or video conferencing) to collaborate, share and learn from each other. eTwinning encourages and develops ICT skills as the main activities inherently use information technology. Being 'twinned' with a foreign school also encourages cross-cultural exchanges of knowledge, fosters students' intercultural awareness, and improves their communication skills.

eTwinning projects can last from one week to several months, and can go on to create permanent relationships between schools. Primary and secondary schools within the European Union member states can participate, in addition to schools from Turkey, Norway and Iceland.

In contrast with other European programs, such as the Comenius programme program, all communication is via the internet; therefore there is no need for grants. Along the same lines, face-to-face meetings between partners schools are not required, although they are not prohibited.

European schoolnet has been granted the role of Central Support Service (CSS) at European level. eTwinning is also supported by a network of National Support Services.
