= Pädagogischer Austauschdienst =

German organization for promoting educational exchanges

The Pädagogischer Austauschdienst (PAD; German: [pɛdaˈɡoːɡɪʃɐ ˈʔaʊ̯sˌtaʊ̯ʃdiːnst]; "Paedagogical Exchange Service") organizes international scholastic exchanges between Germany and other countries. It was founded in 1952 and is attached to the Kultusministerkonferenz. Its work is to make possible international encounters, to improve foreign-language teaching in Germany by using young native speakers, to foster the spread of German as a foreign language abroad and to give German teachers opportunities, through exchange programmes, to further educate themselves and to gain experience abroad.

== History ==
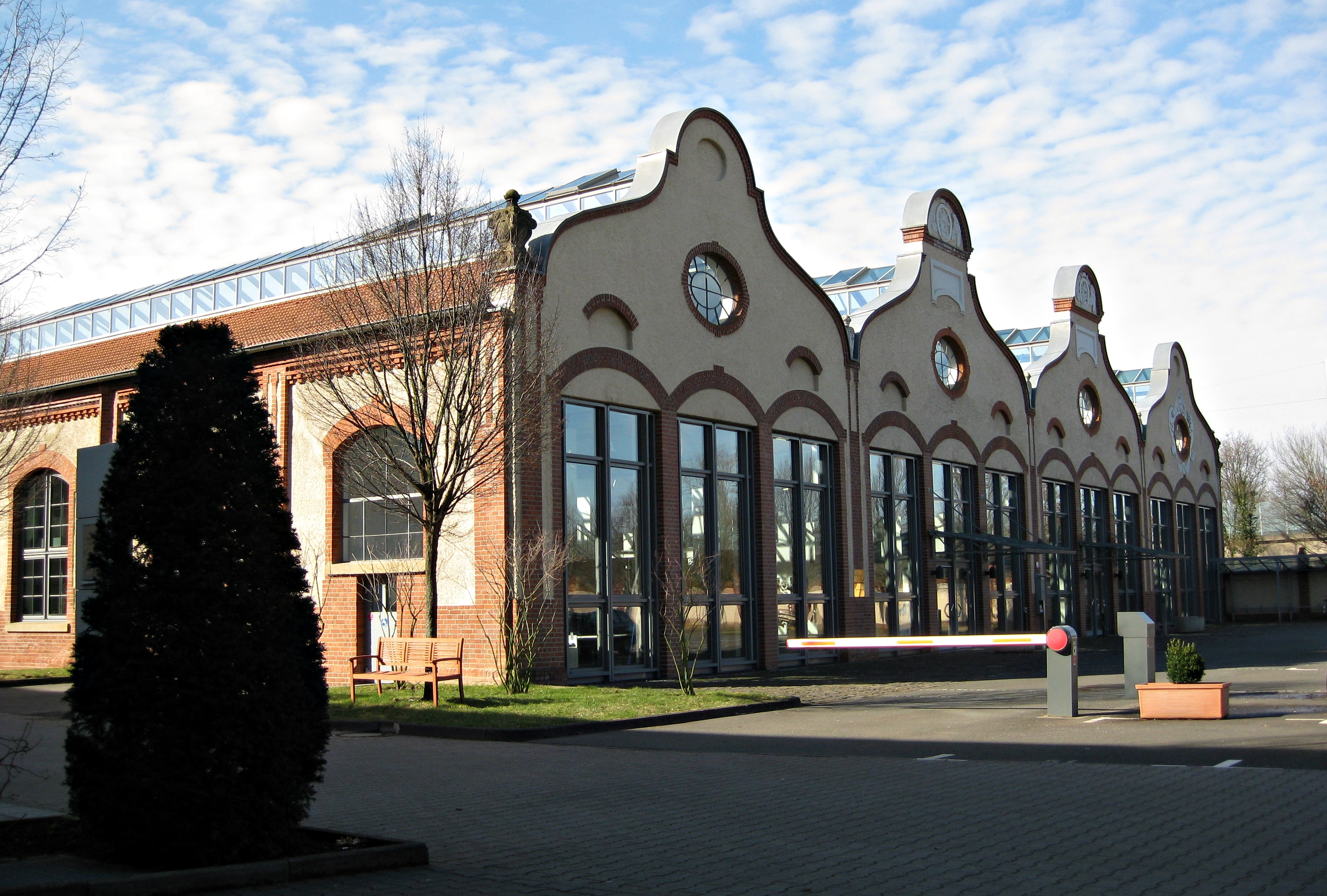
Pädagogischer Austauschdienst headquarters on Graurheindorfer Straße in Bonn

The groundwork for the PAD's founding was laid on 10 August 1951 by the education ministers of the then 12 states of Germany (the Saarland was then still a French protectorate, and Baden-Württemberg was until the next year three separate states) at a meeting held in Königswinter. It was foreseen as a contact point for student and teacher exchanges. In the beginning in April 1952, the PAD was a branch of the German Academic Exchange Service, but was then linked to the secretariat of the Kultusministerkonferenz in October 1955. Among the PAD's first programmes were – as they still are now – an exchange for prospective teachers (Programm für Fremdsprachenassistenz, or "Programme for Foreign-Language Assistance") and the Internationale Preisträgerprogramm ("International Prizewinner Programme") for school students from now some 90 countries worldwide who have distinguished themselves with remarkable performances in German as a school subject. Nowadays, the PAD oversees more than 40 programmes dealing with European and international scholastic exchanges.

Since 2010, the PAD's headquarters have been housed in a former tram depot built in the Art Nouveau style in 1905 and now converted to office use, in Bonn's constituent community of Bonn-Castell.

== Programmes and responsibilities ==
Among the PAD's responsibilities are the programmes for foreign-language assistants. These allow prospective language teachers to go to a country where their target language is spoken to work as a foreign-language assistant. The Federal Republic maintains bilateral exchange programmes with Australia, Belgium, Canada, China, France, Ireland, Italy, Mexico, New Zealand, Norway, Spain, Switzerland, the United Kingdom and the United States.

In 1995 the PAD further took on the responsibilities of National Agency for European Union education programmes in the scholastic sector. Through this programme, which ran from 2014 to 2020, but was extended by seven years in 2021, schools and preschool institutions can finance and organize European exchanges.

Hosted by the Pädagogischer Austauschdienst since 2013 is the European school network eTwinning. On the eTwinning platform, students and their teachers can work together in a protected virtual classroom on educational projects, thus linking Europe's schools and preschool institutions. Even German institutions can work with each other on this platform. The extensive offerings of opportunities for further education include seminars at home and abroad, as well as online courses. The platform thus supports teaching professionals on the way to a European-orientated school that uses such educational media.

The PAD has a partnership with Initiative „Schulen: Partner der Zukunft“ ("Schools: Partners for the Future"), which was set up by the Federal Foreign Office in 2008 to afford young people worldwide a way into the German language and training. The PAD fosters within this initiative's framework, among other things, school partnerships and further education for teachers in Germany. So that schools in Germany and abroad can come into contact with each other, the PAD maintains a forum for those seeking partners (www.partnerschulnetz.de).

Further responsibilities held by the PAD are fostering school partnerships and teacher and student exchanges.

Twice each year the PAD publishes the magazine Austausch bildet ("Exchange Trains"), which can be ordered free. Information about current programmes is announced by way of a monthly email newsletter.

== See also ==
- German American Partnership Program
- etwinning – Community for schools in Europe
