= Oberkassel Süd/Römlinghoven station =

Coordinates: 50.7098°N 7.1743°E

Oberkassel Süd/Römlinghoven
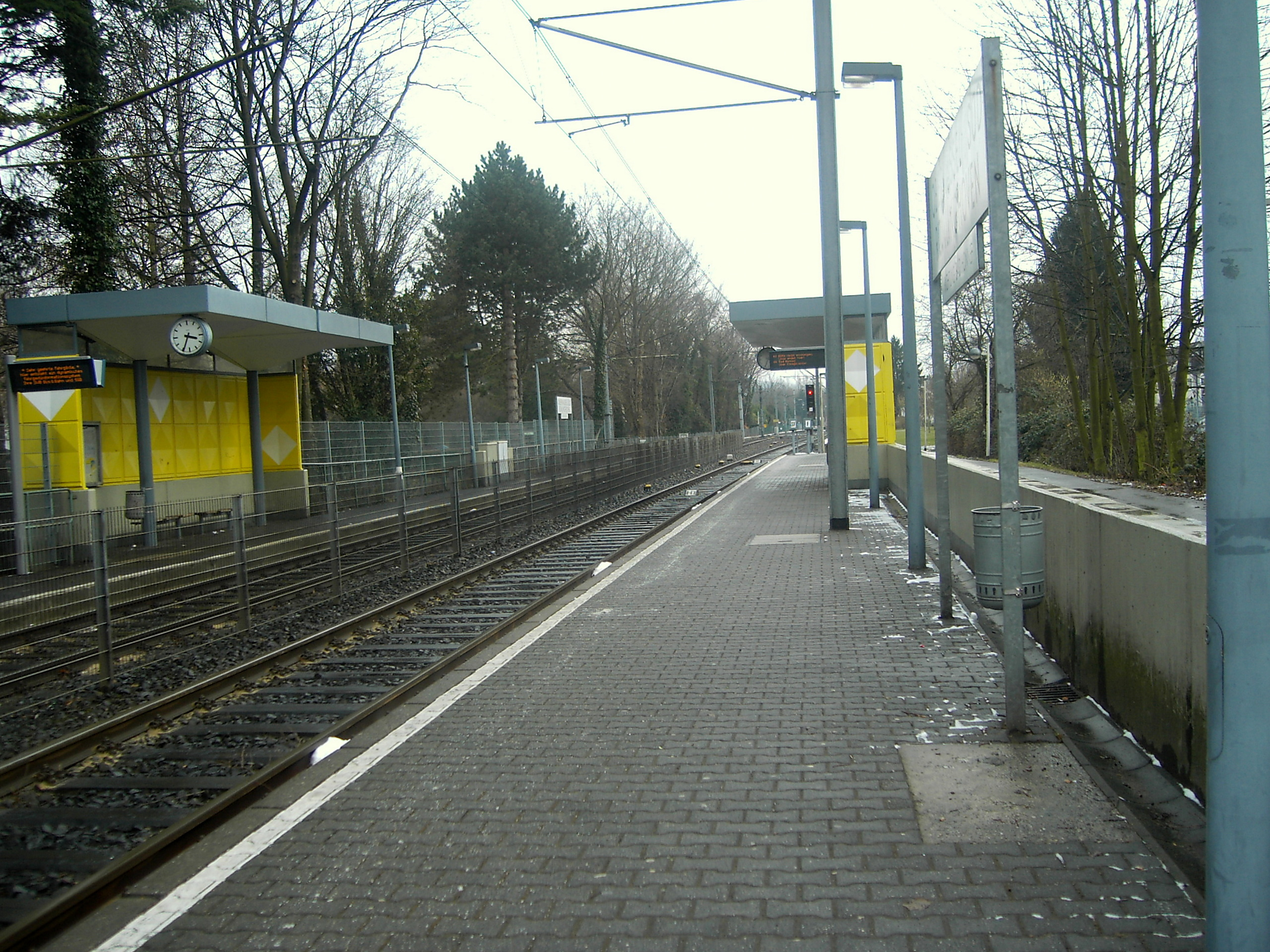

General information
- System: Bonn Stadtbahn station
- Platforms: 2 side platforms
- Tracks: 2

Construction
- Structure type: At grade

Other information
- Fare zone: VRS: 2600

Services
Preceding station	Straßenbahn Bonn	Following station
Oberkassel Mitte towards Dottendorf	Line 62	Terminus
Preceding station	Bonn Stadtbahn	Following station
Oberkassel Mitte towards Siegburg/Bonn	Line 66	Oberdollendorf Nord towards Bad Honnef
Location

Oberkassel Süd/Römlinghoven is a Bonn Stadtbahn station served by lines 62 and 66. It is located in the suburb Oberkassel.
