= Trams in Bonn =

Bonn tramway network
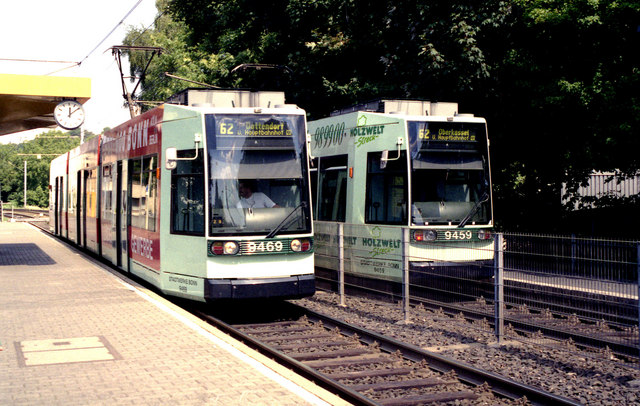
- Trams at Route 62's terminus, Oberkassel Süd.

Operation
- Locale: Bonn, North Rhine-Westphalia, Germany
- Status: In service

Statistics
Horsecar era: 1891–1905
- Status: Converted to electricity
- Owners: Havestadt, Contag. & Cie. co. (first); City of Bonn (second)
- Track gauge: 1,000 mm (3 ft 3 3/8 in) metre gauge
- Propulsion system: Horses
Steam tram era: 1892–1911
- Status: Converted to electricity
- Lines: 1
- Track gauge: 1,000 mm (3 ft 3 3/8 in) metre gauge
- Propulsion system: Steam engine
Electric tram era: Since 1905(?)
- Status: Operational
- Lines: 3
- Owner: City of Bonn
- Operator: Stadtwerke Bonn (SWB)
- Track gauge: 1,435 mm (4 ft 8 1/2 in) standard gauge
- Propulsion system: Electric
- Stock: 24 low-floor tramcars
- Route length: 29.52 km (18.34 mi)
- Bonn Straßenbahn network
- Website: SWB Bus und Bahn
Overview

The Bonn tramway network (German: Straßenbahn Bonn) forms part of the public transport system in the city Bonn, North Rhine-Westphalia, Germany, along with the Bonn Stadtbahn with which the tramlines are heavily integrated. The tram network consists of three tram lines which makes Bonn's tramway relatively small, as it comprises only 29.52 kilometres (18.34 mi) of route. The tramway is operated by 24 low-floor tramcars.

The system is operated by SWB Bus und Bahn, a subsidiary of Stadtwerke Bonn, and integrated in the Verkehrsverbund Rhein-Sieg (VRS).

== Operations ==
=== Lines ===
In addition to the Stadtbahn, Bonn is served by three Straßenbahn (English: tram or streetcar) lines, covering 29.52 kilometres (18.34 mi) of route, that remain in service. Two of the tram lines (Lines 61 and 62) are regular routes, while the third line (Line 65) is a limited service route:

Line	Route	Notes
61	Dottendorf – Bonn Hauptbahnhof – Stadthaus – Auerberg	
62	Dottendorf – Bonn Hauptbahnhof – Stadthaus – Bertha-von-Suttner-Platz – Siebengebirgsbahn – Oberkassel	
65	Ramersdorf – Siebengebirgsbahn – Bertha-von-Suttner-Platz – Auerberg	Limited service

== History ==
=== Horse trams ===
The first trams in Bonn were opened on 19 April 1891 as horsecar tramlines. The tramway was built by the Havestadt, Contag. & Cie. company, with which the city of Bonn had concluded an agreement on 22 and 25 August 1890. The operator of this first tramway was the AG Rheinische-Westfälische Bahngesellschaft, which was founded on 19 November 1889 by the master builder Christian Havestadt and several banks in Berlin.

The Havestadt, Contag & Cie. company initially opened two lines. The first traveled from the intersection Koblenzer Straße/Reuterstraße (today Bundeskanzlerplatz) to Markt, then on to Münsterplatz and Poststraße to the train station and from there to Poppelsdorf. On the return trip, the tramway ran from the train station through Wesselstraße back to Markt. The second tramline ran from Markt to Wilhelmplatz.

After the routes were sold to AG Rheinische-Westfälische Bahngesellschaft on 27 October 1899, a final extension of the horse-drawn tramway followed in 1903, when it was extended from the Poppelsdorfer Allee to Jagdweg in Endenich.

Under an agreement dated 15 and 17 October 1904, the horse-drawn trams passed into the possession of the city of Bonn.

Except for the Pützstraße–Koblenzer Straße line, all the horse tramlines were eventually electrified. The depots for the horse trams lay next to the Villa Loeschigk (the Palais Schaumburg today).

=== Steam tramline Bonn-Godesberg Mehlem ===
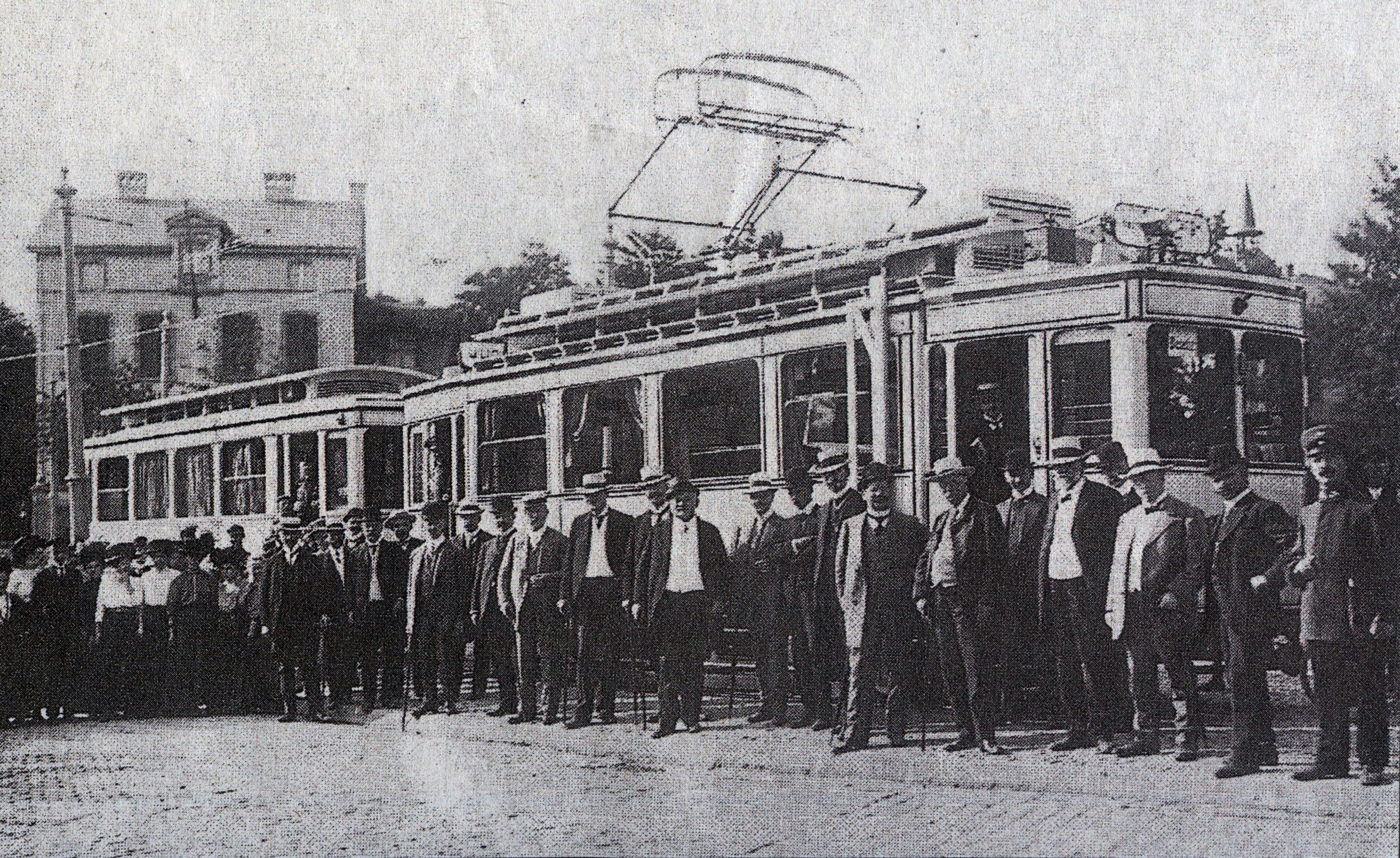
Maiden voyage of the first electrified tram on the Bonn-Godesberg Mehlem line on 24 July 1911.

A steam tramline was started on 22 May 1892 that connected Bonn with Godesberg Mehlem. As with the horse tramlines, this steam tram line came into the possession of the city of Bonn on 15 and 17 October 1904, thought this line was co-owned with the city of then-independent city of Godesberg. The steam operation in 1911 was revamped in three stages, and converted to a standard gauge electrified tramline; at the same time, the terminus was also relocated to Kaiserplatz in Bonn.

The route to Bad Godesberg is now a light rail (Stadtbahn) line, though the section between Bad Godesberg and Mehlem was shut down in 1976.

=== City of Bonn tramlines ===
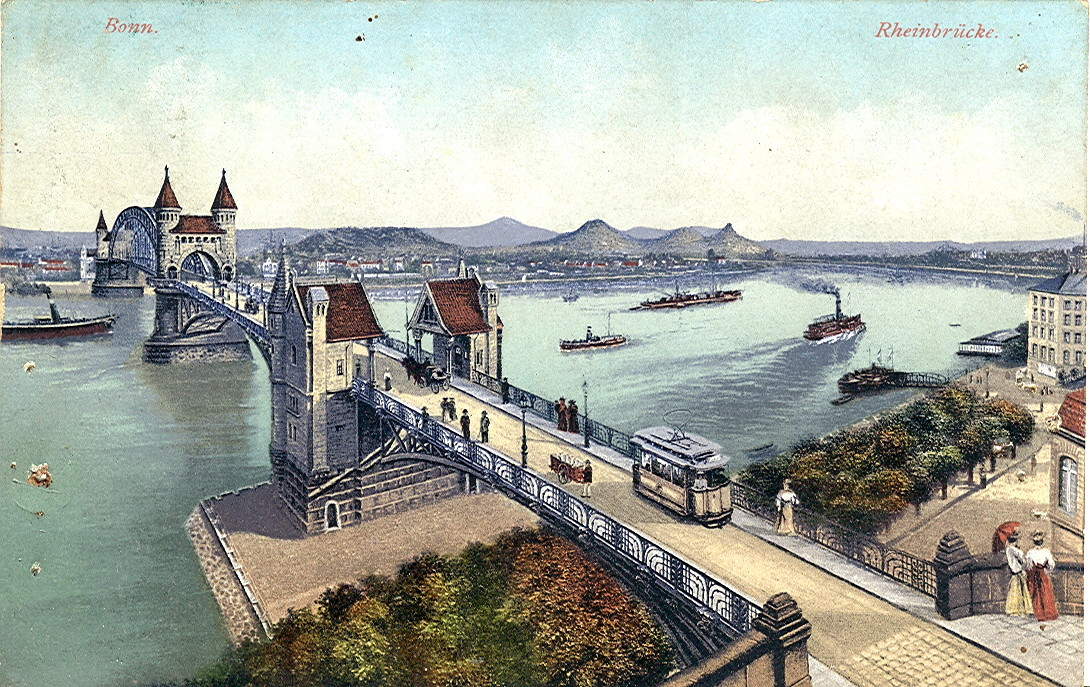
Postcard, dated 22 March 1915, showing a tram on the Bonn Rheinbrücke (Rhine bridge).

In parallel to the horse trams of the Havestadt, Contag. & Cie. company, the city of Bonn continued its own plans to build trams. After receiving funding from the citizenry of Bonn in 1898, a bridge across the Rhine from Bonn to Beuel was built and completed –the Havestadt, Contag. & Cie. company expressed an interest in using the new bridge for its tramways. This request was rejected by the City of Bonn. On 11 March 1898, the city obtained from the railway department in Cologne a concession for the construction and operation of a meter-gauge tramway.

On 21 May 1902, a 2.8-kilometre (1.7 mi) long tramline built by Siemens & Schuckert between Bonn and Beuel went into operation.

After the horse and steam tramlines came into the possession of the city on 15 and 17 October 1904, it was decided on 7 December 1905 to electrify all the tramlines and to convert them to standard gauge.

=== Electrification of the tram network ===
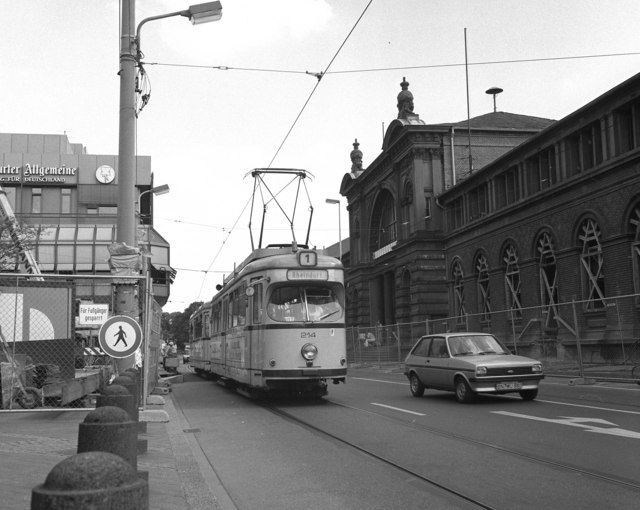
Trams outside of Bonn Hauptbahnhof (July 1986).

During the Second World War, the tramway suffered considerable damage to the fleet and the track network. By 1 October 1946, the tram network, except for some minor sections, was back in operation. Among other things, the route to the Venusberg was not resumed since this district was occupied by the Allied forces.

On 28 August 1949, the section between Koblenzer Straße and Gronau was converted to bus operation. By this time, Federal Government was anxious to make it sure that cars could move freely in the government administrative district without having to take trams into consideration.

After the Rhine bridge at Beuel was restored on 12 November 1949, tram service there resumed.

=== Decline of the tram network ===
After 4 October 1953, the two routes from the train station to Poppelsdorf and from Endenich to the Rheindorfer Straße were shut down for financial reasons. At this point, Bonn was down to just three tramlines. On 3 April 1955, the routes from the Venusberg and from Endenich to the station were closed for financial reasons. Thus, by 1955, Bonn's tram network was reduced to just Line 1 from Dottendorf to Rhinedorf and Line 2 from Dottendorf to Beuel.

On 1 November 1966, Line 1 was moved when a new autobahn was constructed. Another change took place in September 1974, when both tramlines had to be relocated out of downtown because of the creation of a downtown pedestrian zone. In 1976, the federal government tried one last time to completely close Bonn's tramway, but failed due to, among other things, the resistance of the city's populace.

In 1986, an ornate Jugendstil tram depot in the city's north end was shut down for good, and stood empty until it was renovated and repurposed as an office building in 2000. It now houses the Pädagogischer Austauschdienst.

=== Recent expansion of the tram network ===
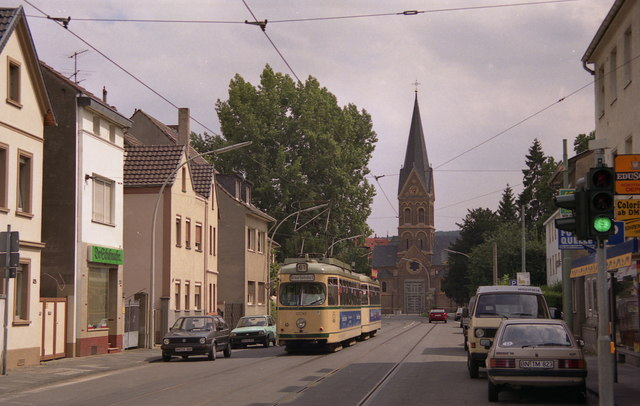
Trams in Hausdorffstrasse in Dottendorf, Bonn (Aug 1991).

On 19 August 1994, a new tramline from Graurheindorf to Auerberg entered into operation. Because this new terminus had no turning loop, all the previously operating tramcars were taken out of service at this time, and replaced with bi-directional low-floor trams.

== See also ==
- Bonn Stadtbahn
