= Bonn Stadtbahn =

Public transit network in Bonn, Germany

Stadtbahn Bonn

Overview
- Locale: Bonn, Cologne, Bornheim, Siegburg, Sankt Augustin and Bad Honnef, NRW, Germany
- Transit type: Light rail (Stadtbahn & Straßenbahn)
- Number of lines: 6 (4 regular + 2 peak lines)
- Number of stations: 81 (64 in Bonn, 17 in the Rhein-Sieg-Kreis)
- Annual ridership: 92 million
- Website: swb-busundbahn.de

Operation
- Began operation: 1975 (as Stadtbahn)
- Operators: SWB, SSB
- Number of vehicles: 75 Type B (Stadtbahn)

Technical
- System length: 95.8 km (59.5 mi)
- Track gauge: 1,435 mm (4 ft 8 1/2 in) (standard gauge)

The Bonn Stadtbahn (German: Stadtbahn Bonn) is a Stadtbahn system in Bonn and the surrounding Rhein-Sieg area, that also includes the Bonn Straßenbahn. Although with six actual Stadtbahn lines (as well as three tram lines) the network is relatively small, two of Bonn's Stadtbahn lines connect to the much larger Cologne Stadtbahn (and are numbered according to that system, not Bonn's).

The Stadtbahn network comprises 95.84 kilometres (59.55 mi) of route. There are 64 stations and stops in the city of Bonn proper, and another 17 in the Rhein-Sieg-Kreis. Additionally, 8.72 kilometres (5.42 mi) of the Stadtbahn is located underground, as are 12 of the Stadtbahn stations.

== History ==
In the middle of the 1960s Bonn lay at the heart of five different railway enterprises. Besides the Deutsche Bundesbahn (the West German national railway company) there was the independent Cologne-Bonn railway (KBE) and three separate tram concerns:

- The tram network operated by the city of Bonn (SWB), which had declined in the 1950s.
- The SSB, which operated electrified services in the Rhein-Sieg area between Bonn, Beuel, Siegburg, and Bad Honnef.
- The BGM, which operated a tram line from Bonn through Bad Godesberg to Mehlem.

This arrangement was inexpedient for a city which boasted 140,000 inhabitants and served as the seat of government for West Germany. The existing arrangements faced competition from the development of automobile traffic, and the federal government was anxious to transform Bonn from a provincial town to a modern capital. At the time trams were considered outmoded and unmodern, so the government was willing to provide funds for removal and replacement.

In 1967 the Bonn City Council approved a new transportation plan which included an underground railway (U-Bahn) between Bonn and Bad Godesberg; the initial ground breaking took place in October of the same year. The overall concept involved a mixed system of trams (operated by the SSB) and heavy rail (operated by the KBE). However, the KBE went into financial decline at the end of the decade and survived only with the support of the North Rhine-Westphalia government; in this environment expansion was impossible. Instead, the railway lines of the KBE would be used to provide a link between Bonn and the Cologne tram network. To this end, new, lighter rolling stock was introduced that would be more suitable on Cologne's Rhine bridges and subway tunnels. The Siegburg lines had already switched to Stadtbahn rolling stock in 1974. On 22 March 1975, the Bonn Stadtbahn was officially inaugurated.

== Routes ==
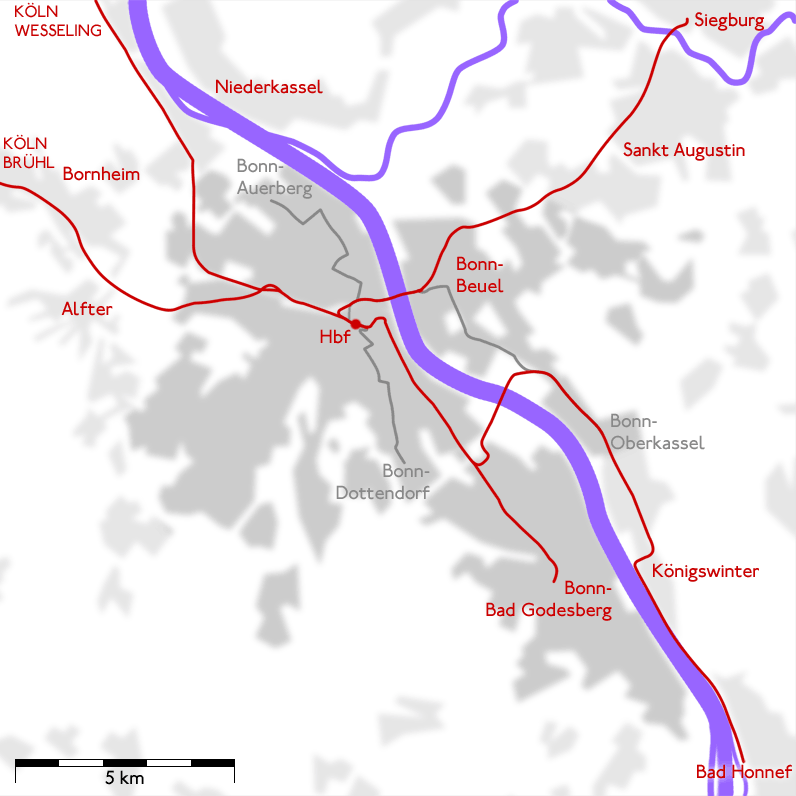
Route map of the Bonn Stadtbahn

Bonn Stadtbahn network

The Bonn Stadtbahn operates over former tram and heavy rail routes, which were either rebuilt for city rail traffic or replaced by underground lines. The only completely new section is the connection over the Südbrücke (South Bridge), which is used by the 66 and 68 lines on the southbound journey from Bonn Hauptbahnhof to Ramersdorf and Bad Honnef.

=== Stammstrecke ===
The "Stammstrecke" (trunk route) is the 4.5-kilometre (2.8 mi) segment between Bonn Hauptbahnhof station and Olof-Palme-Allee station, which is served by all Stadtbahn lines except 18, but not by the three tram lines. The majority of the route runs through a tunnel between Hauptbahnhof and Heussallee/Museumsmeile, constructed in 1975, replacing the BGM-operated tram tracks which ran above-ground along the Adenauerallee and down to Bad Godesberg.

== Lines ==
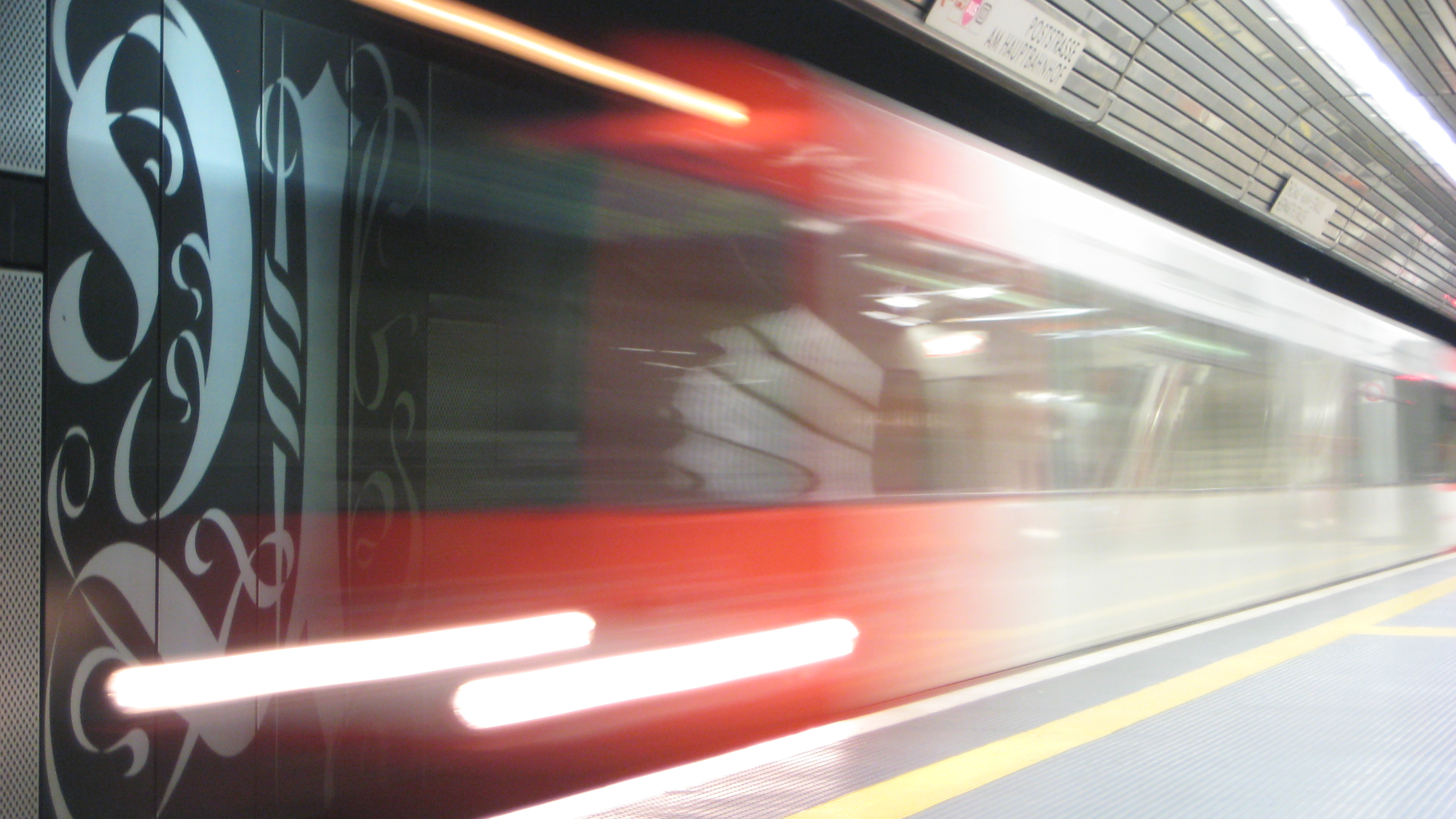
Line 16 arriving at Bonn Hauptbahnhof

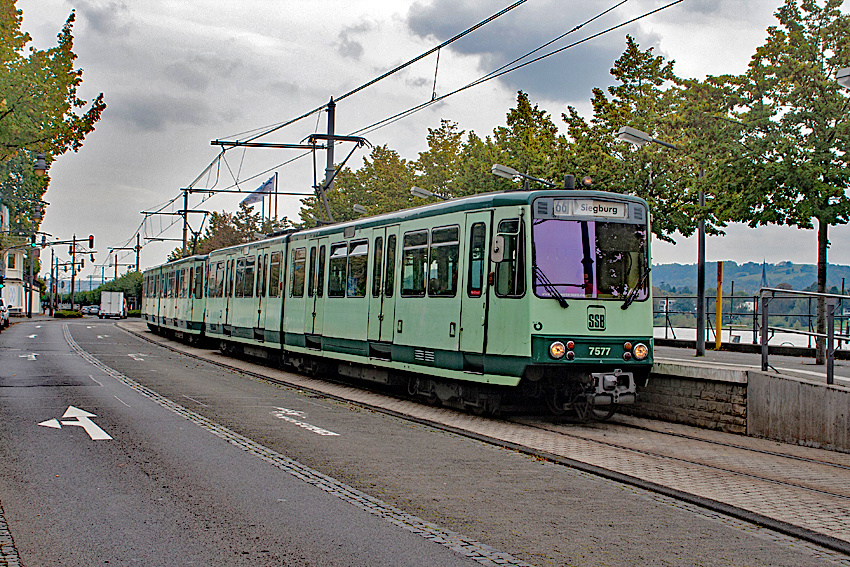
Bonn Type B 7577 on Line 66 at Königswinter

The Bonn Stadtbahn covers 95.84 kilometres (59.55 mi) of route and is composed of six lines all together, of which four operate regularly and two only during peak hours:

Line	Route	Notes
16	Köln-Niehl-Sebastianstraße - Köln Hauptbahnhof - Rheinuferbahn - Bonn Hauptbahnhof - Stammstrecke - Bad Godesberg	Operated in cooperation with Cologne Stadtbahn (i.e. is primarily a line of the Cologne Stadtbahn).
18	Köln-Thielenbruch - Köln Hauptbahnhof - Brühl – Vorgebirgsbahn – Bonn Hauptbahnhof	Operated in cooperation with Cologne Stadtbahn (i.e. is primarily a line of the Cologne Stadtbahn).
63	Tannenbusch – Rheinuferbahn – Bonn Hauptbahnhof – Stammstrecke – Bad Godesberg	
66	Siegburg – Sankt Augustin – Bonn Hauptbahnhof – Stammstrecke – Südbrücke – Siebengebirgsbahn – Bad Honnef	
67	Siegburg – Sankt Augustin – Bonn Hauptbahnhof – Stammstrecke – Bad Godesberg	Peak line: School days, mornings only
68	Bornheim – Vorgebirgsbahn – Bonn Hauptbahnhof – Stammstrecke – Südbrücke – Ramersdorf	Peak line: Limited service on weekdays from Bornheim to Ramersdorf; at weekends line terminates at Bonn Hbf

== See also ==
- Trams in Bonn
