= Bonn =

Federal City of Bonn Bundesstadt Bonn (German)
- Federal city
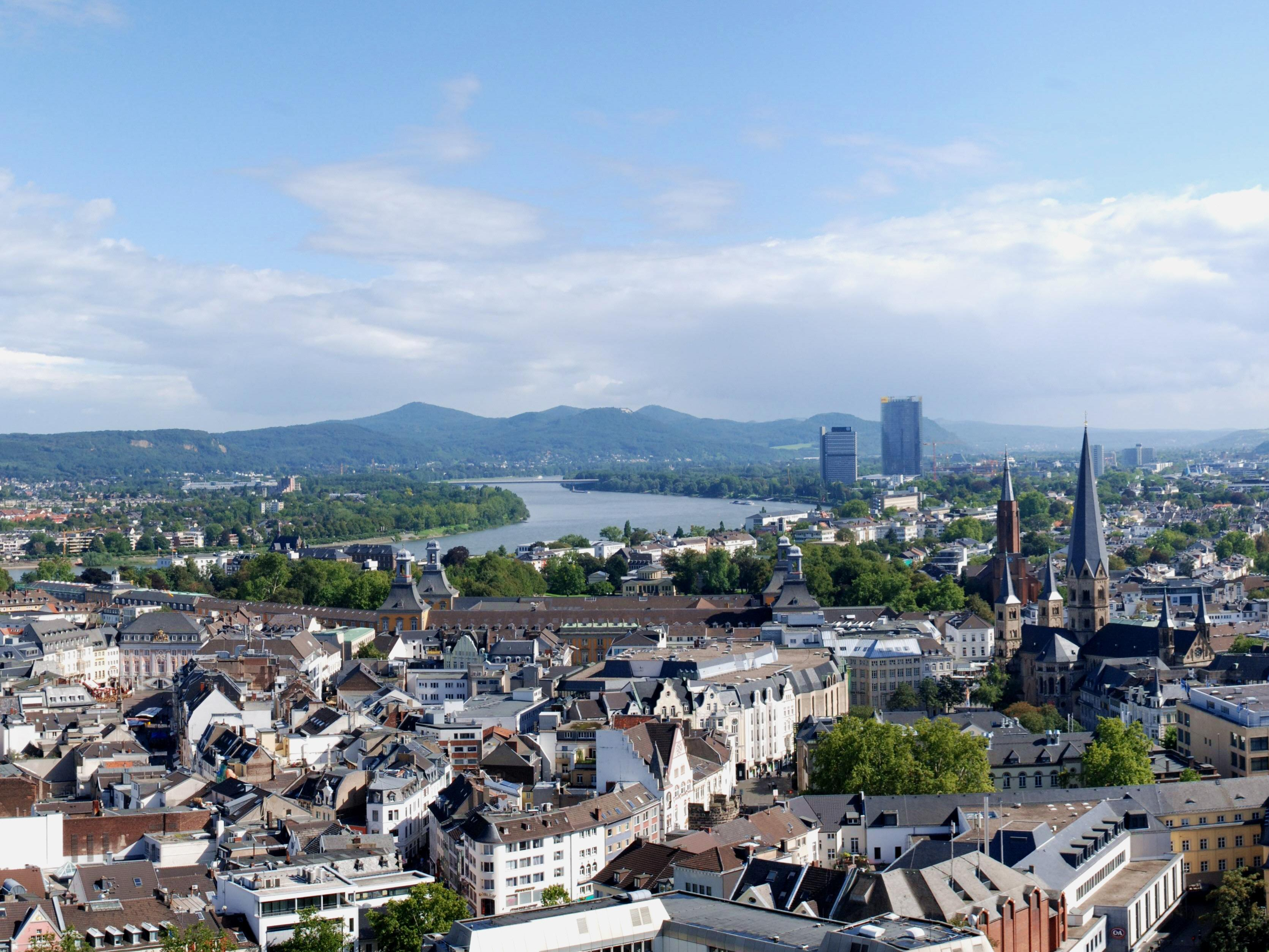
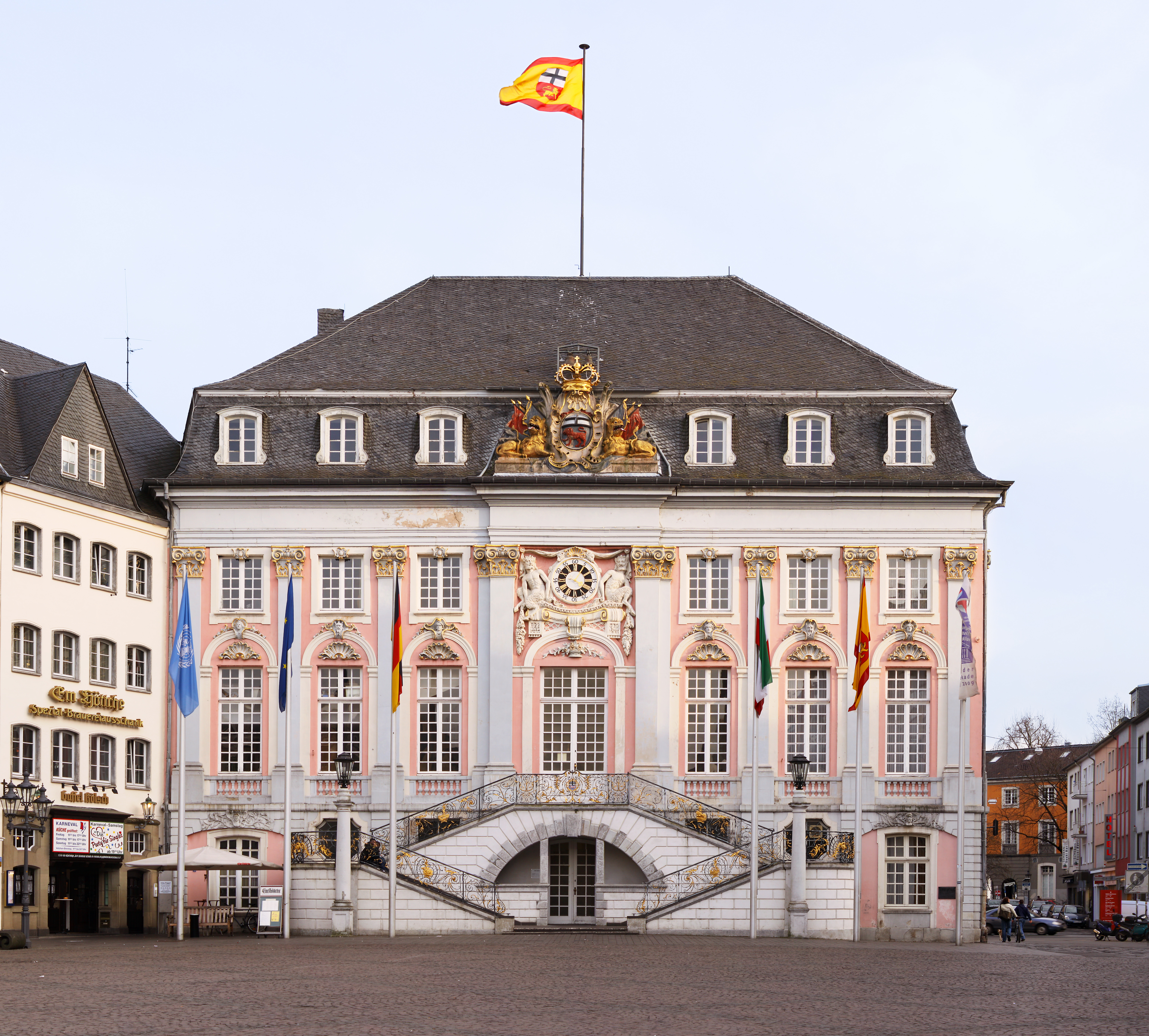
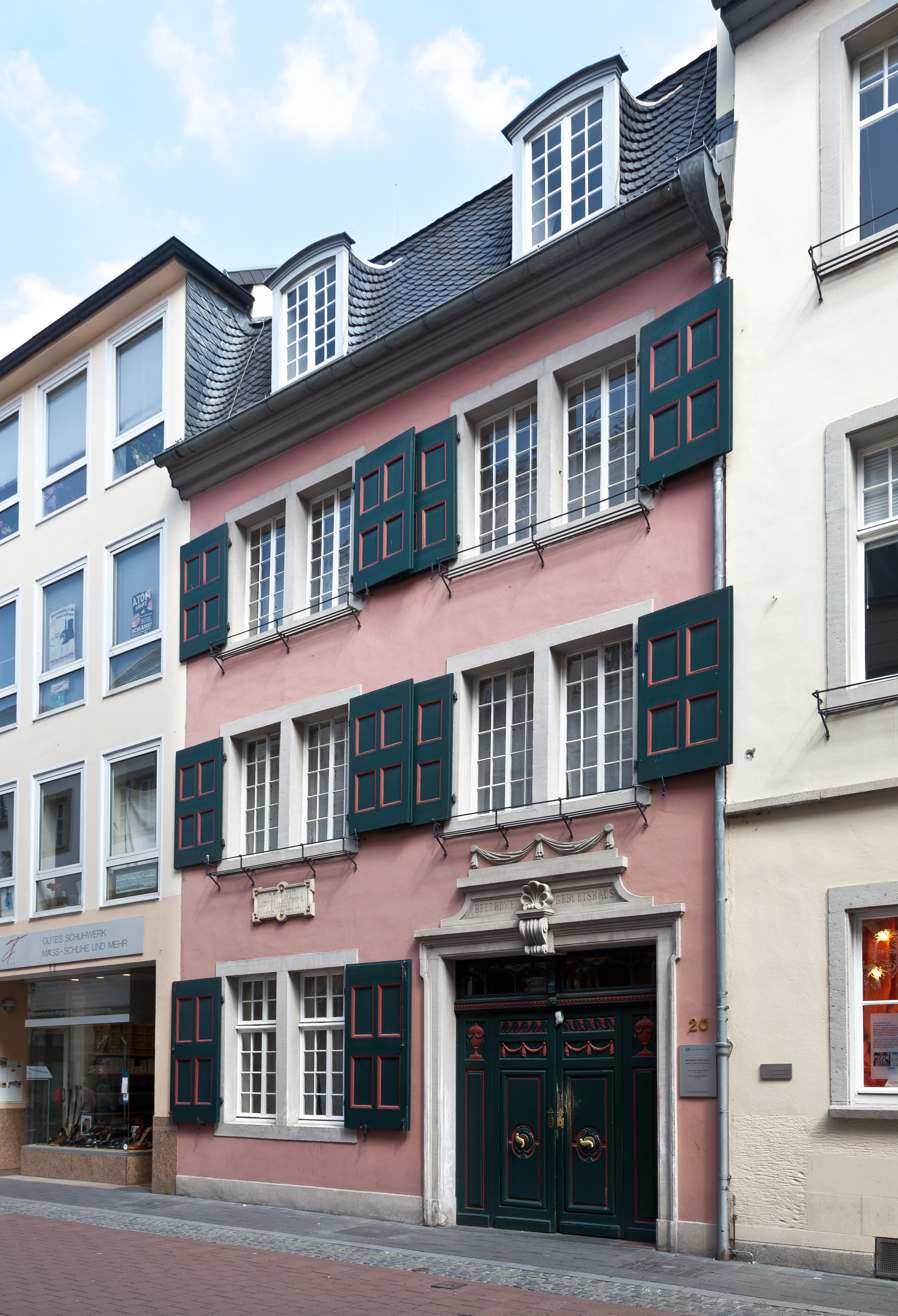
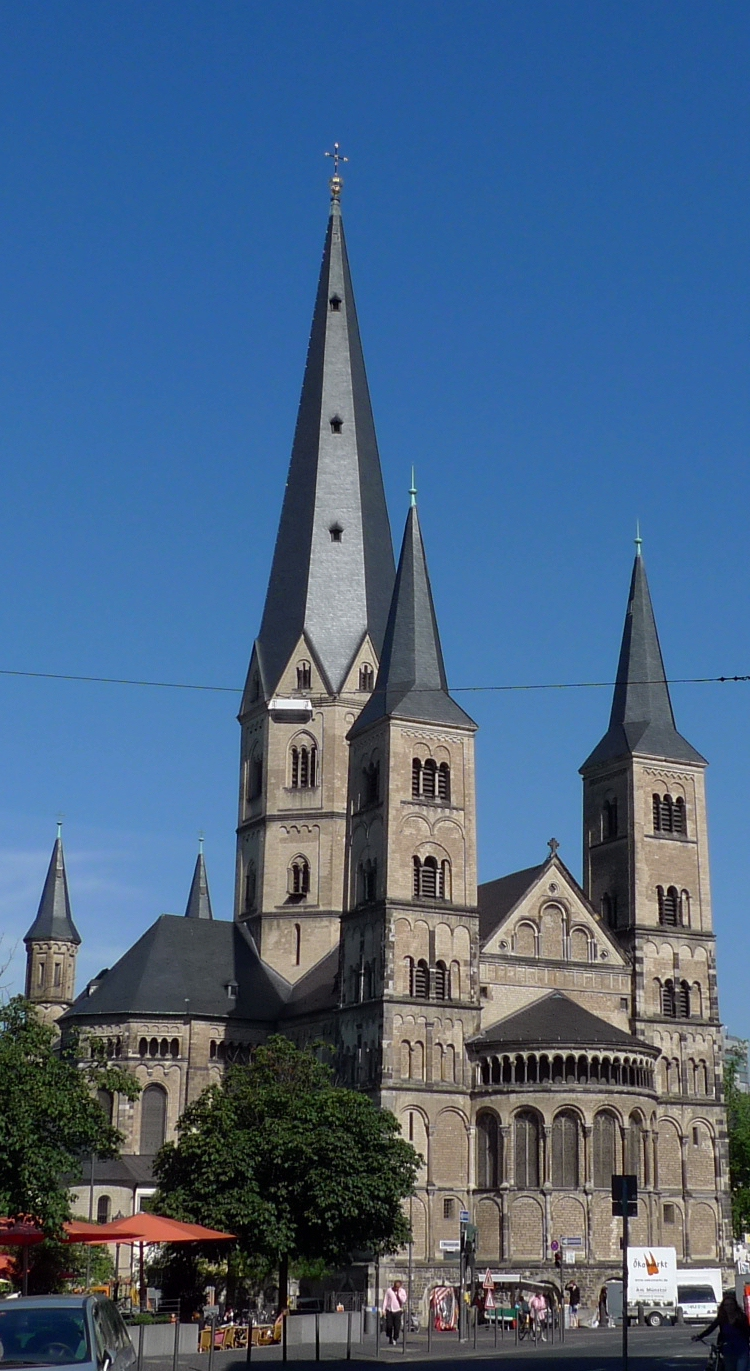
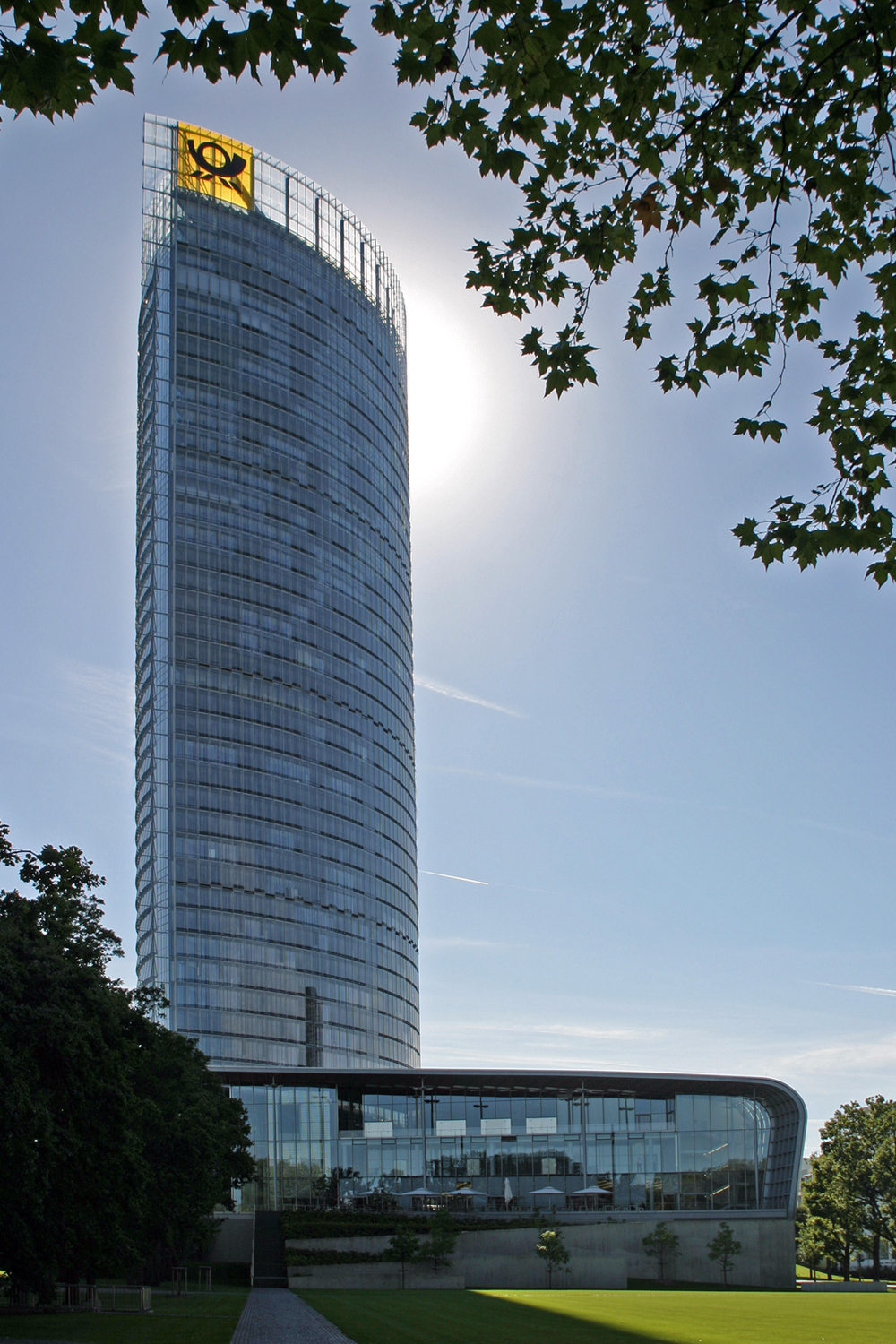
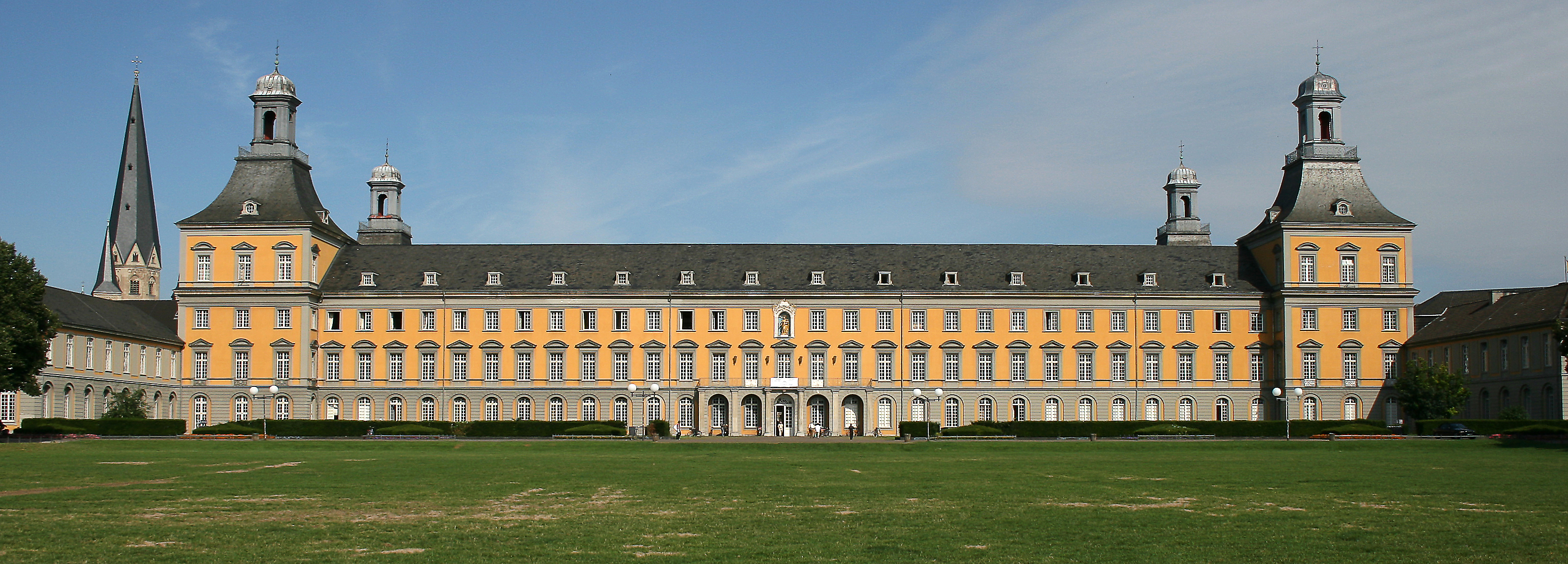
- Bonn skyline Town Hall Beethoven House Bonn Minster Post Tower Electoral Palace

- Flag Coat of arms

- Bonn within North Rhine-Westphalia
- Interactive map of Federal City of Bonn
- Location within Germany Location within North Rhine-Westphalia
- Coordinates: 50°44′07″N 7°06′08″E
- Country: Germany
- State: North Rhine-Westphalia
- Admin. region: Cologne
- District: Urban district
- Founded: 1st century BC

Government
  - Mayor (2025–30): Guido Déus (CDU)
  - Governing parties: Greens/ SPD/ Left/ Volt

Area
  - Total: 141.06 km^{2} (54.46 sq mi)
- Elevation: 60 m (200 ft)

Population (2025-12-31)
  - Total: 323,587
  - Density: 2,294.0/km^{2} (5,941.3/sq mi)
- Time zone: UTC+01:00 (CET)
  - Summer (DST): UTC+02:00 (CEST)
- Postal codes: 53111–53229
- Dialling codes: 0228
- Vehicle registration: BN
- Website: www.bonn.de

Bonn (German: [bɔn]), officially the Federal City of Bonn (German: Bundesstadt Bonn), is a federal city in the German state of North Rhine-Westphalia, located on the banks of the Rhine. With a population exceeding 320,000, it lies about 24 km (15 mi) south-southeast of Cologne, in the southernmost part of the Rhine-Ruhr region. Bonn served as the capital of West Germany from 1949 until 1990 and was the seat of government for reunified Germany until 1999, when the government relocated to Berlin. The city holds historical significance as the birthplace of Germany's current constitution, the Basic Law.

Founded in the 1st century BC as a settlement of the Ubii and later part of the Roman province Germania Inferior, Bonn is among Germany's oldest cities. It was the capital city of the Electorate of Cologne from 1597 to 1794 and served as the residence of the Archbishops and Prince-electors of Cologne. The period during which Bonn was the capital of West Germany is often referred to by historians as the Bonn Republic.

Following the German reunification, a political compromise known as the Berlin-Bonn Act ensured that the German federal government retained a significant presence in Bonn. As of 2019, approximately one-third of all ministerial jobs remain in the city. Bonn is considered an unofficial secondary capital of Germany and is the location of the secondary seats of the president, the chancellor, and the Bundesrat. Bonn is also the location of the primary seats of six federal ministries and twenty federal authorities. The city's title as Federal City (German: Bundesstadt) underscores its political importance.

The global headquarters of Deutsche Post DHL and Deutsche Telekom, both DAX-listed corporations, are in Bonn. The city is home to the Rheinische Friedrich-Wilhelms-Universität Bonn university, and a total of 20 United Nations institutions, the highest number in all of Germany. These institutions include the headquarters for Secretariat of the UN Framework Convention Climate Change (UNFCCC), the Secretariat of the UN Convention to Combat Desertification (UNCCD), and the UN Volunteers programme. Birthplace of composer Ludwig van Beethoven, a center of Rhenish carnival, and its geography by the Middle Rhine make it an important tourist destination. In Bonn the Bönnsch Platt, a dialect of the Ripuarian language is spoken by all generations, especially during carnival.

== Geography ==
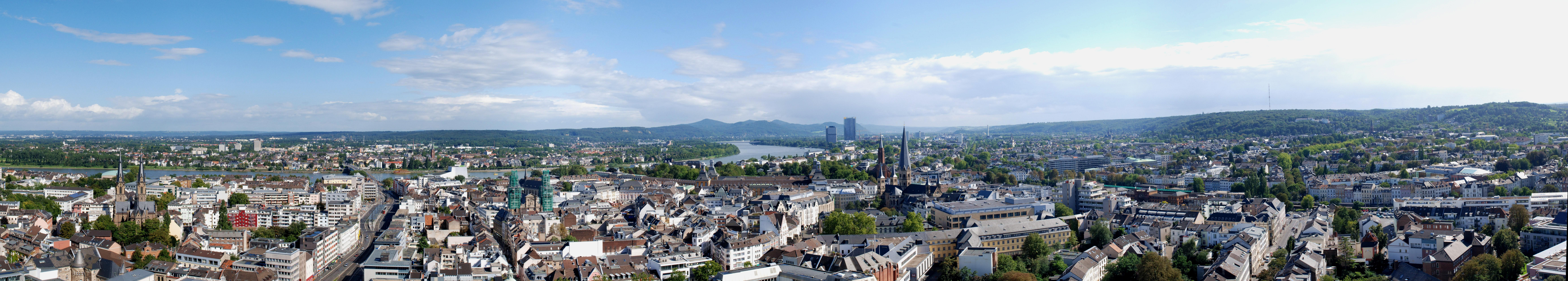
View over central Bonn as seen from the Stadthaus, including the Siebengebirge, a hill range on the east bank of the Middle Rhine

=== Topography ===
Situated in the southernmost part of the Rhine-Ruhr region, Germany's largest metropolitan area with over 11 million inhabitants, Bonn lies within the German state of North Rhine-Westphalia, on the border with Rhineland-Palatinate. Spanning an area of more 141.2 km^{2} (55 sq mi) on both sides of the river Rhine, almost three-quarters of the city lies on the river's left bank.

To the south and to the west, Bonn borders the Eifel region which encompasses the Rhineland Nature Park. To the north, Bonn borders the Cologne Lowland. Natural borders are constituted by the river Sieg to the north-east and by the Siebengebirge (also known as the Seven Hills) to the east. The largest extension of the city in north–south dimensions is 15 km (9 mi) and 12.5 km (8 mi) in west–east dimensions. The city borders have a total length of 61 km (38 mi). The geographical centre of Bonn is the Bundeskanzlerplatz (Chancellor Square) in Bonn-Gronau.

=== Administration ===
The German state of North Rhine-Westphalia is divided into five governmental districts (German: Regierungsbezirk), and Bonn is part of the governmental district of Cologne (German: Regierungsbezirk Köln). Within this governmental district, the city of Bonn is an urban district in its own right. The urban district of Bonn is then again divided into four administrative municipal districts (German: Stadtbezirk). These are Bonn, Bonn-Bad Godesberg, Bonn-Beuel and Bonn-Hardtberg. In 1969, the independent towns of Bad Godesberg and Beuel as well as several villages were incorporated into Bonn, resulting in a city more than twice as large as before.

Administrative divisions of the Federal City of Bonn
Municipal district (Stadtbezirk)	Coat of arms	Population (as of December 2014)	Sub-district (Stadtteil)
Bad Godesberg	Wappen des Stadtbezirks Bad Godesberg	73,172	Alt-Godesberg, Friesdorf, Godesberg-Nord, Godesberg-Villenviertel, Heiderhof, Hochkreuz, Lannesdorf, Mehlem, Muffendorf, Pennenfeld, Plittersdorf, Rüngsdorf, Schweinheim
Beuel	Wappen des Stadtbezirks Beuel	66,695	Beuel-Mitte, Beuel-Ost, Geislar, Hoholz, Holtorf, Holzlar, Küdinghoven, Limperich, Oberkassel, Pützchen/Bechlinghoven, Ramersdorf, Schwarzrheindorf/Vilich-Rheindorf, Vilich, Vilich-Müldorf
Bonn	Wappen des Stadtbezirks Bonn	149,733	Auerberg, Bonn-Castell (known until 2003 as Bonn-Nord), Bonn-Zentrum, Buschdorf, Dottendorf, Dransdorf, Endenich, Graurheindorf, Gronau, Ippendorf, Kessenich, Lessenich/Meßdorf, Nordstadt, Poppelsdorf, Röttgen, Südstadt, Tannenbusch, Ückesdorf, Venusberg, Weststadt
Hardtberg	Wappen des Stadtbezirks Hardtberg	33,360	Brüser Berg, Duisdorf, Hardthöhe, Lengsdorf

=== Climate ===
Bonn has an oceanic climate (Köppen: Cfb; Trewartha: Dobk). In the south of the Cologne lowland in the Rhine valley, Bonn is in one of Germany's warmest regions.

The Bonn weather station has recorded the following extreme values:

- Its highest temperature was 40.9 °C (105.6 °F) on 25 July 2019.
- Its lowest temperature was −23.0 °C (−9.4 °F) on 27 January 1942.
- Its greatest annual precipitation was 956.7 mm (37.67 in) in 2007.
- Its least annual precipitation was 381.5 mm (15.02 in) in 1959.
- The longest annual sunshine was 2013.9 hours in 2018.
- The shortest annual sunshine was 1240.7 hours in 1981.

Climate data for Bonn (1991–2020 normals, extremes 1933–present (Note: The data from 1933 to 1999 comes from the Bonn-Friesdorf weather station, and the data from 2000 to date comes from the Bonn-Roleber weather station.))
Month	Jan	Feb	Mar	Apr	May	Jun	Jul	Aug	Sep	Oct	Nov	Dec	Year
Record high °C (°F)	16.1 (61.0)	20.7 (69.3)	25.7 (78.3)	30.7 (87.3)	32.9 (91.2)	37.9 (100.2)	40.9 (105.6)	37.4 (99.3)	34.6 (94.3)	27.5 (81.5)	21.0 (69.8)	17.5 (63.5)	40.9 (105.6)
Mean maximum °C (°F)	12.7 (54.9)	13.6 (56.5)	19.0 (66.2)	24.3 (75.7)	27.5 (81.5)	31.5 (88.7)	32.9 (91.2)	32.3 (90.1)	27.4 (81.3)	22.2 (72.0)	16.4 (61.5)	12.8 (55.0)	34.9 (94.8)
Mean daily maximum °C (°F)	5.6 (42.1)	6.7 (44.1)	10.7 (51.3)	15.8 (60.4)	19.3 (66.7)	22.5 (72.5)	24.1 (75.4)	23.9 (75.0)	20.0 (68.0)	15.0 (59.0)	9.7 (49.5)	6.4 (43.5)	15.0 (59.0)
Daily mean °C (°F)	3.1 (37.6)	3.5 (38.3)	6.4 (43.5)	10.6 (51.1)	14.1 (57.4)	17.2 (63.0)	18.8 (65.8)	18.5 (65.3)	14.9 (58.8)	11.0 (51.8)	6.8 (44.2)	4.0 (39.2)	10.7 (51.3)
Mean daily minimum °C (°F)	0.4 (32.7)	0.4 (32.7)	2.3 (36.1)	5.3 (41.5)	8.7 (47.7)	11.8 (53.2)	13.6 (56.5)	13.4 (56.1)	10.3 (50.5)	7.3 (45.1)	3.9 (39.0)	1.5 (34.7)	6.6 (43.9)
Mean minimum °C (°F)	−7.5 (18.5)	−6.5 (20.3)	−4.3 (24.3)	−1.4 (29.5)	2.1 (35.8)	6.7 (44.1)	8.8 (47.8)	8.4 (47.1)	4.8 (40.6)	0.7 (33.3)	−2.5 (27.5)	−6.5 (20.3)	−9.4 (15.1)
Record low °C (°F)	−23.0 (−9.4)	−20.2 (−4.4)	−11.9 (10.6)	−5.3 (22.5)	−3.0 (26.6)	1.8 (35.2)	5.6 (42.1)	4.0 (39.2)	−0.5 (31.1)	−5.7 (21.7)	−9.0 (15.8)	−18.3 (−0.9)	−23.0 (−9.4)
Average precipitation mm (inches)	60.1 (2.37)	48.4 (1.91)	51.5 (2.03)	43.5 (1.71)	70.1 (2.76)	81.5 (3.21)	83.9 (3.30)	87.3 (3.44)	62.5 (2.46)	60.3 (2.37)	60.5 (2.38)	57.6 (2.27)	767.1 (30.20)
Average extreme snow depth cm (inches)	4.3 (1.7)	2.8 (1.1)	2.5 (1.0)	0 (0)	0 (0)	0 (0)	0 (0)	0 (0)	0 (0)	0 (0)	0.5 (0.2)	2.4 (0.9)	6.6 (2.6)
Average precipitation days (≥ 0.1 mm)	17.5	15.6	14.7	12.0	14.1	14.1	15.8	15.8	13.6	15.3	16.9	18.6	183.8
Average relative humidity (%)	84.0	80.0	74.1	68.5	71.2	72.5	71.9	74.3	78.6	83.3	85.7	85.7	77.5
Mean monthly sunshine hours	57.4	80.4	132.9	177.5	201.6	208.3	205.6	197.4	158.6	103.1	59.3	49.1	1,631.2
Source: Deutscher Wetterdienst / SKlima.de

== History ==
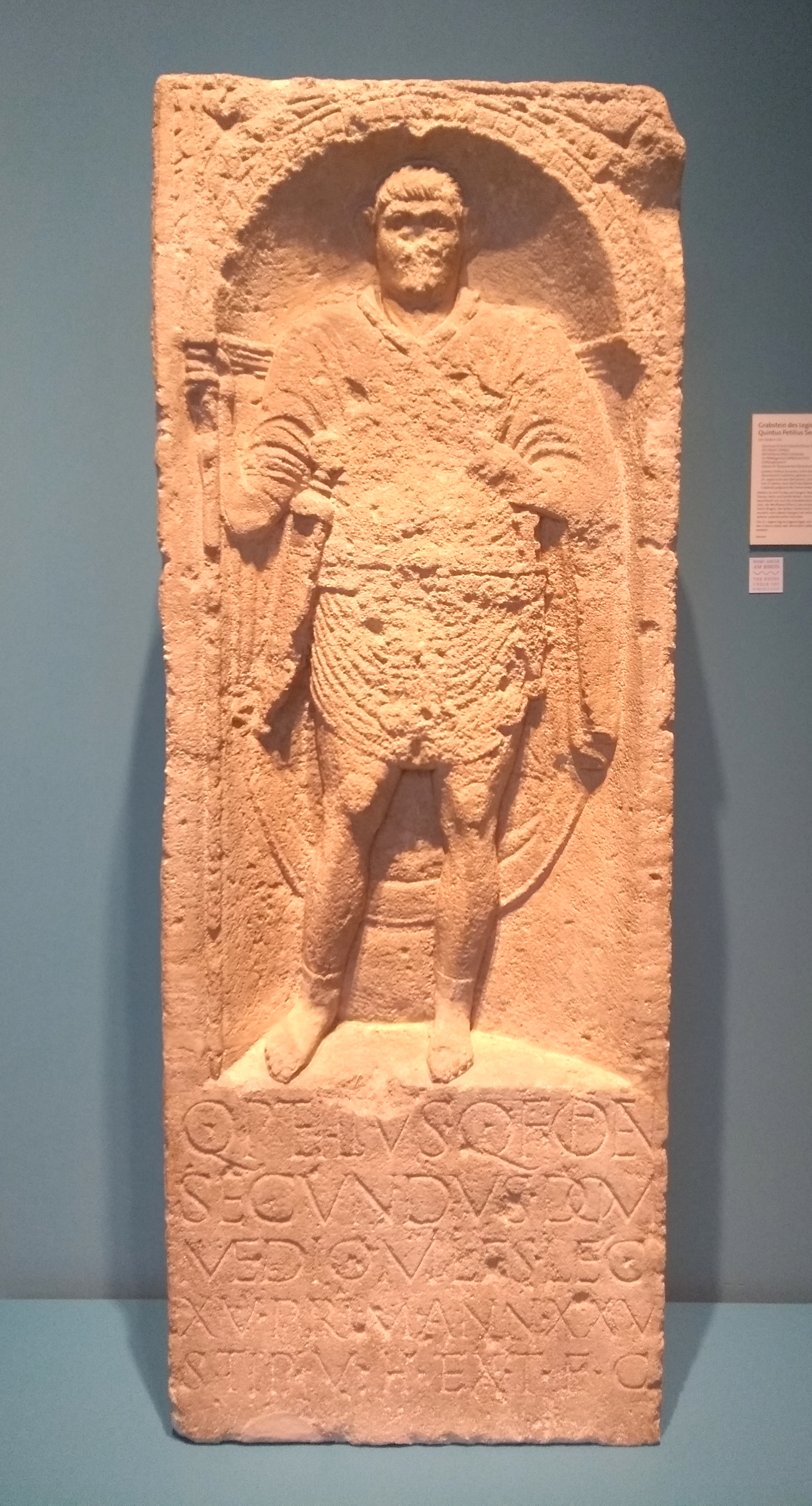
Gravestone of the Roman legionary Quintus Petilius Secundus, stationed in Bonn

=== Chronology ===
In 1989, Bonn celebrated its 2,000th anniversary. The city was commemorating the construction of the first fortified Roman camp on the Rhine in 12 BCE, after the Roman governor Agrippa had already settled the Ubii there in 38 BCE. However, people had lived in the area of today's city much earlier. Evidence of this includes the 14,000-year-old double burial at Oberkassel as well as a trench and wooden palisades found on the Venusberg, dating back to around 4080 BCE.

In the years before the birth of Christ, Roman presence in Bonna was modest, but this changed after the Roman defeat in the Battle of the Teutoburg Forest in 9 CE. In the following decades, a legion was stationed there, which built the Legionary Fortress Bonn in the northern part of present-day Bonn. Around the camp, and to the south along what is now Adenauerallee, traders and craftsmen settled in a vicus.

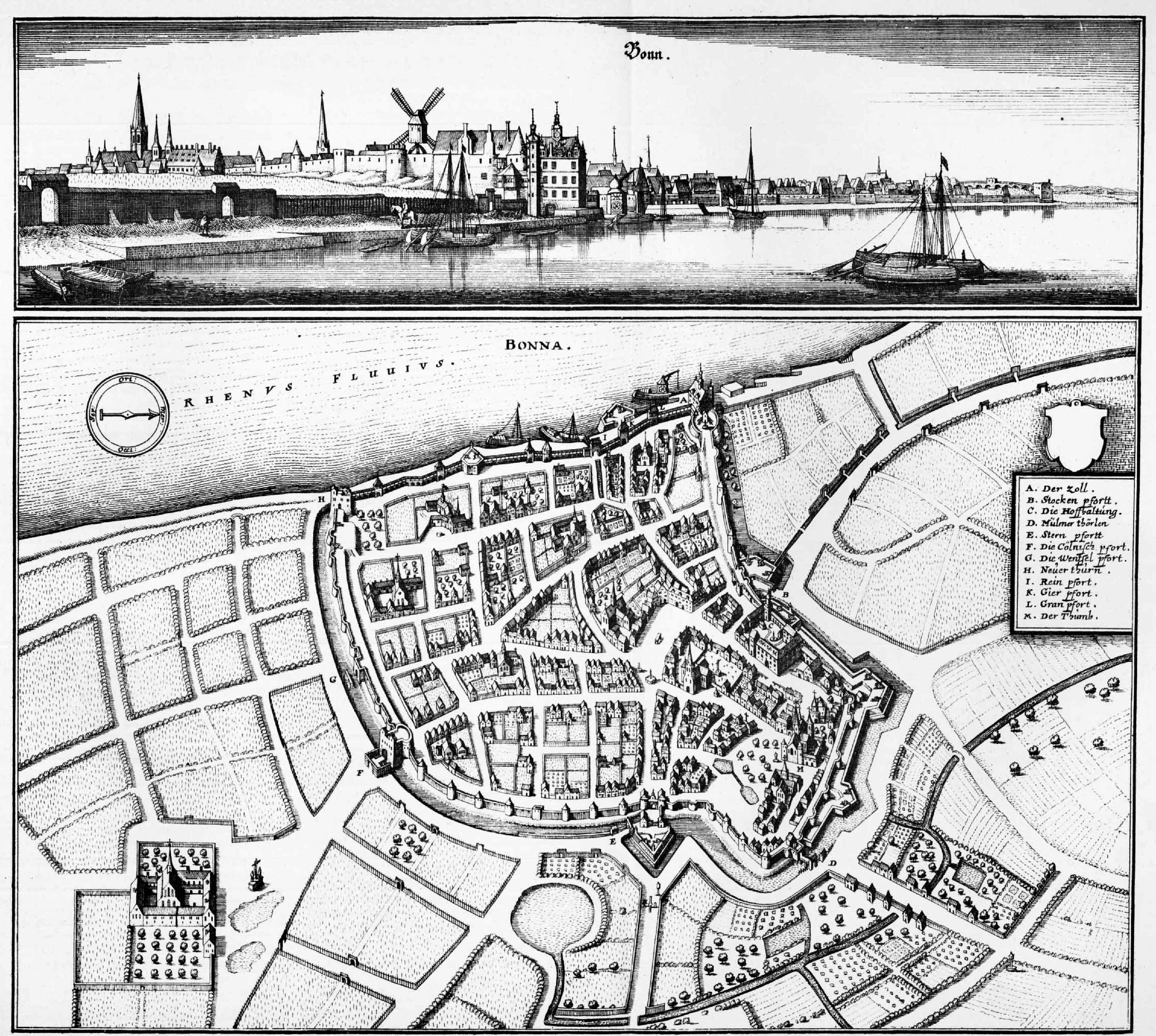
Bonn 1646 – Copper engraving by Matthäus Merian the Elder

With the end of the Roman Empire, Bonn declined during Late Antiquity and the Early Middle Ages. During the Viking raids in the Rhineland, Bonn was burned twice in 882, and in 883, the recently rebuilt town was again attacked, burned, and looted by the Normans.

In the Frankish Empire, and finally in the 9th and 10th centuries, a religious center developed around the Bonn Minster (the Villa Basilika), and a market settlement emerged in the area of today's market square. The year 1243 is considered the year in which Bonn was granted full city rights.

The outcome of the Battle of Worringen in 1288 was of great importance for the further development of the city. The Cologne prince-electors made Bonn—along with Brühl and Poppelsdorf—one of their residences, and eventually their residence city. The magnificent palaces built by the prince-electors in the 17th and 18th centuries gave the city its baroque splendor.

This era ended with the occupation by French troops on October 8, 1794. This was followed by nearly two decades of occupation by the troops of Napoleon. Taxes in the form of food, clothing, and accommodations, as well as the loss of the electoral state administration, led to poverty among the population and a decline in the number of inhabitants by around 20%. The French introduced a civil code (Code civil) and a municipal constitution in Bonn. Even under French occupation, medium and large industrial companies, particularly in the textile sector, were established in Bonn. The French also pursued a thorough secularization: properties of the ecclesiastical electorate, especially the electoral buildings, were taken into state ownership. The areas on the right bank of the Rhine that are now part of Bonn (Vilich) came into the possession of the Prince of Nassau-Usingen; Oberkassel belonged to the Duchy of Berg, a French satellite state. By the Treaty of Lunéville of February 9, 1801, the Rhine near Bonn was designated as the French eastern border. Bonn became the seat of a sub-prefecture in the newly formed Rhin-et-Moselle.

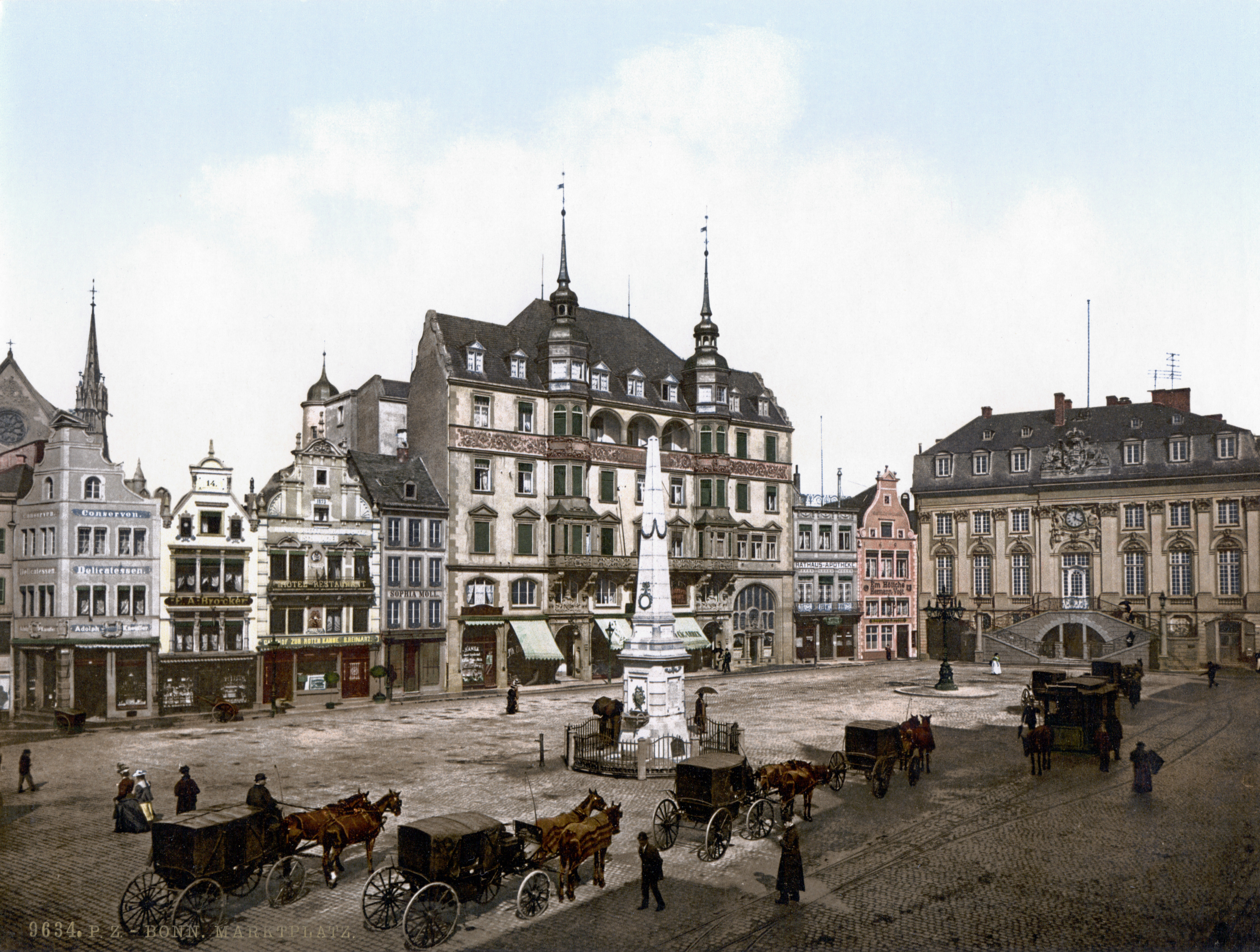
Market square with the Old Town Hall (right), photochrom print around 1900

After the defeats of the French army in the Russian campaign of 1812 and the Battle of Leipzig, the French evacuated Bonn in January 1814.

Following the decisions of the Congress of Vienna, Bonn became part of Prussia in 1815. In the following decades, the city was shaped by the newly founded University of Bonn, established by the Prussian government on October 18, 1818. The founder and namesake was King Frederick William III of Prussia. A university had existed in Bonn at the end of the 18th century but was closed during the French occupation in 1794. The Prussian foundation was not a continuation of that earlier institution, but part of a program that also included the University of Berlin and the University of Breslau. The term Rheinische in the name of the Bonn university was meant to mark it as a "sister" institution to the Berlin and Breslau universities. Over the next 100 years, Bonn became the preferred place of study for the Hohenzollern princes. It was nicknamed the "Princes' University," as both the then-Prussian Crown Prince Frederick William, his son Wilhelm, and Wilhelm's four sons studied there. Other sons of noble families also favored studying at this university in the 19th century. Before the founding of the Bonn university, Cologne had been its main rival. The "enlightened tradition" of Bonn, compared to the "holy Cologne," likely made it more suitable for a confessionally neutral university. Practical reasons also favored Bonn: the old electoral palace and the Poppelsdorf Palace were already available as suitable buildings.

From 1815 onward, professors, students, civil servants, and officers arrived in Bonn, including many Protestants from the Prussian provinces, which was unusual for the predominantly Catholic Rhineland. Prussia also made Bonn a garrison town. As a result, Bonn became popular as a retirement location for military officers. Tourism also grew after German unification in 1871, fueled by the Romanticism on the Rhine of the time.

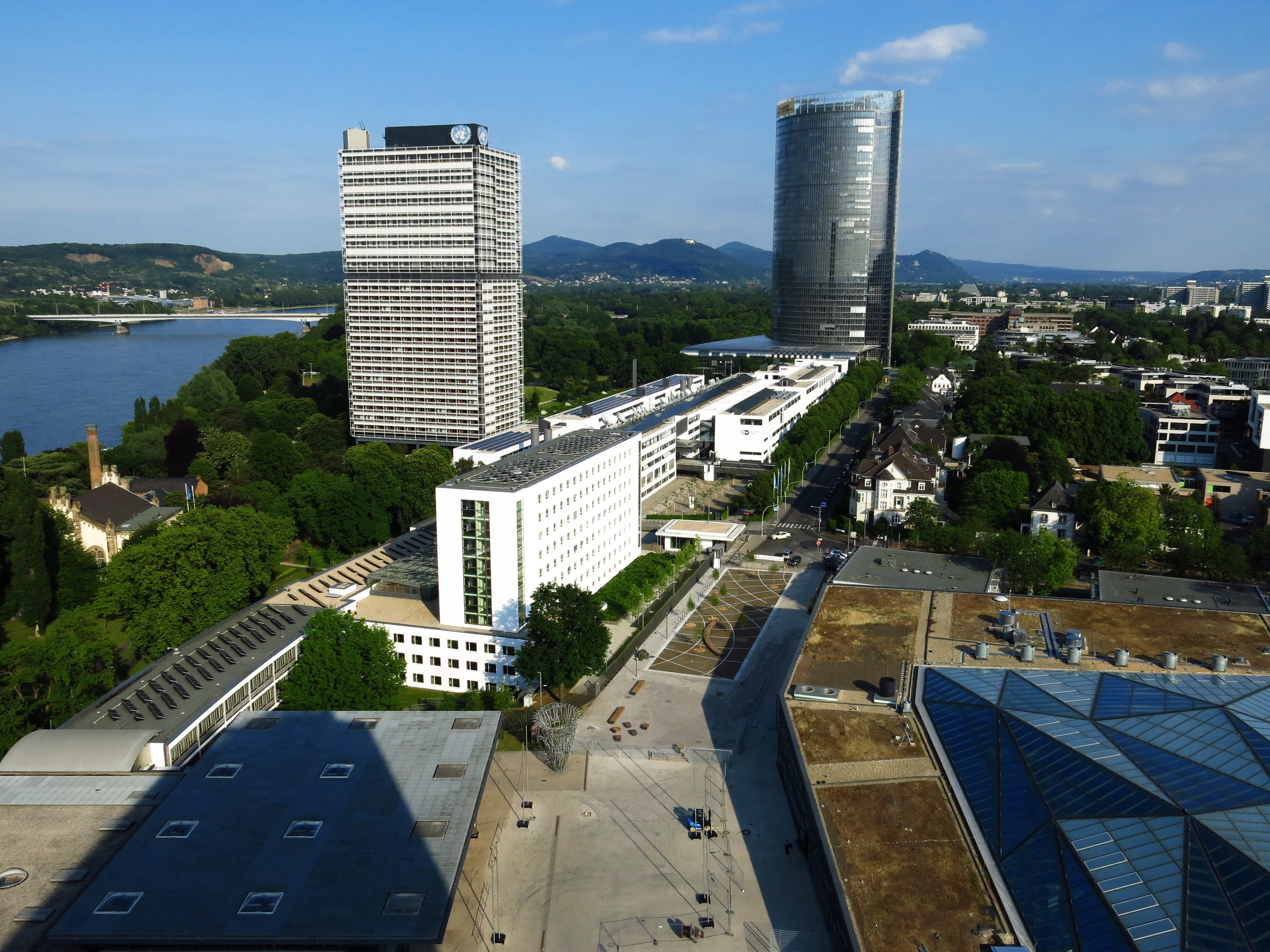
The government quarter in Bonn: roof of the World Conference Center Bonn (front right), Old Parliament House and Schürmann-Bau (center), Langer Eugen (left), and Post Tower – with the Siebengebirge mountains in the background (2015)

After the First World War, the city was initially occupied by Canadian, then British, and finally (until 1926) by French troops.

More than 1,000 Bonn residents, mostly of Jewish descent, were murdered during the Nazi era (Holocaust). About 8,000 people were forced to leave their hometown, were arrested, or imprisoned in concentration camps. When American troops entered Bonn on March 9, 1945, ending World War II for the city, 30% of the buildings were destroyed. Of these, 70% were slightly to severely damaged, and 30% were completely destroyed residential buildings. More than 4,000 Bonn residents had died in bombings. On May 28, 1945, Bonn became part of the British occupation zone.

After the Second World War, the city experienced rapid reconstruction and expansion, especially after the decision to make Bonn the provisional capital of the new Federal Republic of Germany instead of Frankfurt am Main on November 29, 1949 (see Capital of Germany#The capital debate). As a result of the law implementing the Bundestag resolution of June 20, 1991, to complete German unification (Berlin/Bonn Act)—which involved the relocation of the parliament, parts of the government, many diplomatic missions, lobbyists, and the privatization of the German Federal Post Office—the city underwent another transformation around the turn of the millennium. The remaining ministries, newly established federal agencies, headquarters of major German companies, international organizations, and institutions of science and research administration are now the drivers of this structural change, which has so far been considered successful and continues to this day.

On October 30, 2014, under the patronage and active participation of Chancellor Angela Merkel, the Unity Tree Monument for German Unity was planted.

=== Municipal mergers ===
The city of Bonn was enlarged several times through municipal mergers. Around 1900, Bonn grew significantly. As a result, on June 1, 1904, the towns of Poppelsdorf, Endenich, Kessenich, and Dottendorf—which had already merged physically with Bonn—were incorporated.

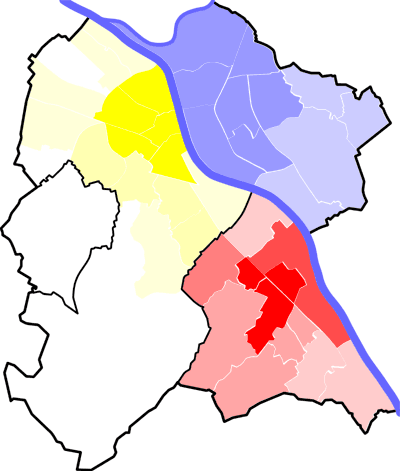
Mergers on today's territory of Bonn since 1899: Bad Godesberg since 1904: Bonn since 1952: Beuel

Through the law on the municipal reorganization of the Bonn area ("Bonn Act") of August 1, 1969, the city's population roughly doubled, and the Sieg District was merged with the Bonn District to form the Rhein-Sieg District. The formerly independent cities of Bad Godesberg and Beuel and the municipality of Duisdorf became independent boroughs of Bonn.

The borough of Beuel, on the right bank of the Rhine, was also assigned the villages of Holzlar, Hoholz, and the Oberkassel administrative area, which had previously belonged to the Sieg District. Bonn itself was expanded with the villages of Ippendorf, Röttgen, Ückesdorf, Lessenich/Meßdorf, and Buschdorf from the former Bonn District, while Lengsdorf and Duisdorf, along with some new housing developments, formed the borough of Hardtberg.

The city of Bad Godesberg had already incorporated several villages earlier. As early as 1899, Plittersdorf and Rüngsdorf had joined Godesberg, and in 1904, Friesdorf was added, effectively merging Bad Godesberg with Bonn. In 1915, Bad Godesberg expanded southwest out of the valley, leading to the incorporation of Muffendorf. On July 1, 1935, Lannesdorf and Mehlem became districts of Bad Godesberg.

== Politics and government ==
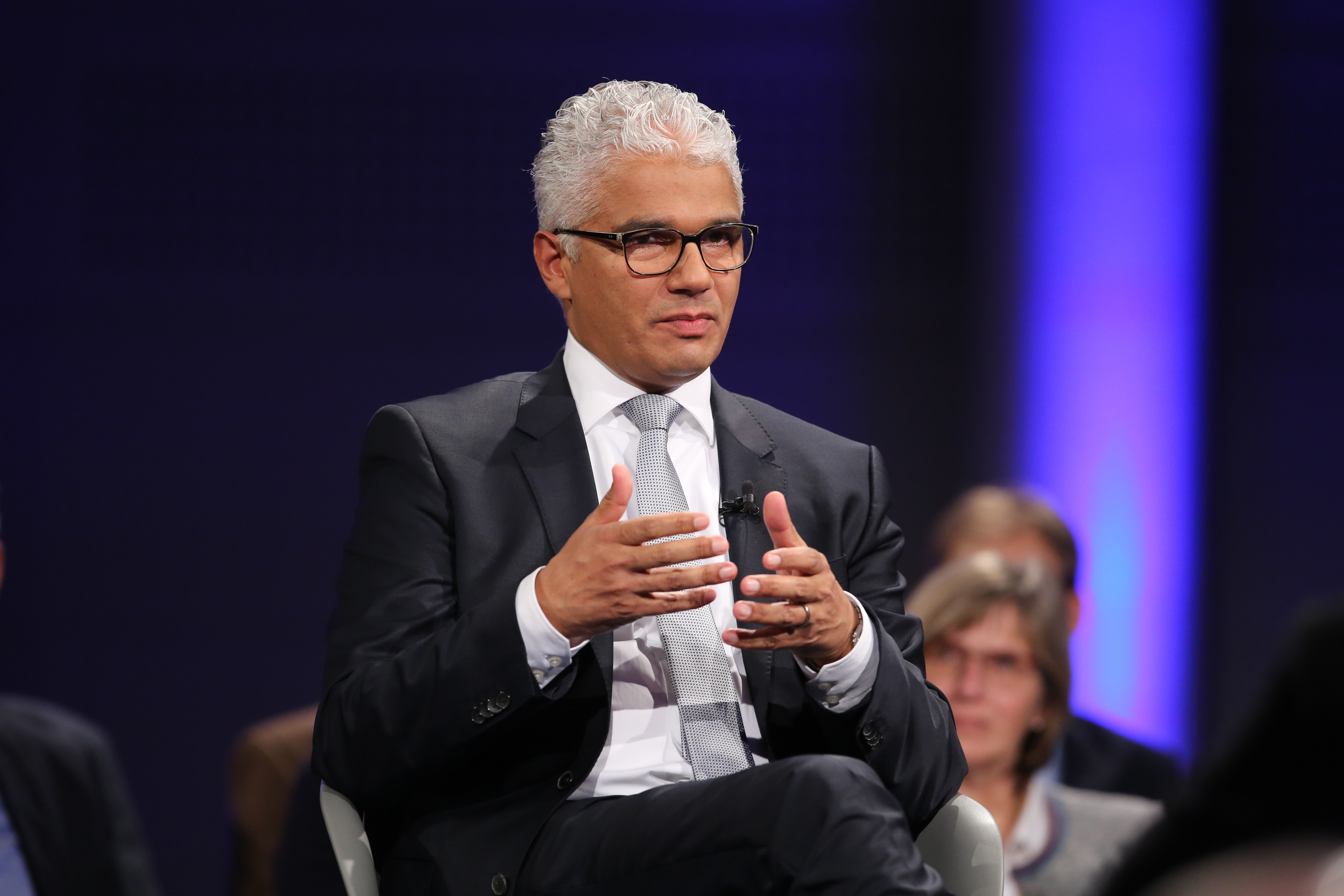
Ashok-Alexander Sridharan (CDU) was the mayor of Bonn from 2015 until 2020.

=== Mayor ===
Results of the second round of the 2025 mayoral election

The current mayor of Bonn is Guido Déus of Christian Democratic Union of Germany since 2025. He defeated incumbent mayor Katja Dörner in the most recent mayoral election, which was held on 14 September 2025, with a runoff held on 28 September. The results were as follows:

Candidate	Party	First round		Second round	
Candidate	Party	Votes	%	Votes	%
Guido Déus	Christian Democratic Union	61,745	38.9	74,321	54.0
Katja Dörner	Alliance 90/The Greens	52,533	33.1	63,324	46.0
Jochen Reeh-Schall	Social Democratic Party	14,040	8.6		
Dr. Michael Faber	The Left	9,752	6.2		
Wolfgang Truckenbrodt	Alternative for Germany	8,179	5.2		
Johannes Schott	Citizens' League Bonn	5,707	3.6		
Petra Nöhring	Free Democratic Party	3,149	2.0		
Marcel Klingenstein	Die PARTEI	1,438	0.9		
Haluk Yildiz	Alliance for Innovation and Justice	1,446	0.9		
Merve Nur Laçin-Kilinç	Democratic Alliance for Diversity and Awakening	591	0.4		
Valid votes		158,582	99.1	137,646	99.5
Invalid votes		1,497	0.9	623	0.5
Total		160,079	100.0	138,269	100.0
Electorate/voter turnout		247,052	64.8	246,965	57,1
Source: State Returning Officer

=== City council ===
Results of the 2025 city council election

The Bonn city council governs the city alongside the mayor. It used to be based in the Rococo-style Altes Rathaus (old city hall), built in 1737, located adjacent to Bonn's central market square. However, due to the enlargement of Bonn in 1969 through the incorporation of Beuel and Bad Godesberg, it moved into the larger Stadthaus facilities further north. This was necessary for the city council to accommodate an increased number of representatives. The mayor of Bonn still sits in the Altes Rathaus, which is also used for representative and official purposes.

The most recent city council election was held on 14 September 2025, and the results were as follows:

Party	Votes	%	+/-	Seats	+/-
Christian Democratic Union (CDU)	50,895	31.9	▲6.2	21	▲4
Alliance 90/The Greens (Grüne)	41,861	26.3	▼1.6	17	▼2
Social Democratic Party (SPD)	18,867	11.8	▼3.7	8	▼3
The Left (Die Linke)	13,856	8.7	▲2.5	6	▲2
Alternative for Germany (AfD)	9,630	6.0	▲2.8	4	▲2
Citezen's Association Bonn (BBB)	8,509	5.3	▼1.8	3	▼1
Free Democratic Party (FDP)	4,684	2.9	▼2.2	2	▼1
Volt Germany (Volt)	4,315	2.7	▼2.4	2	▼1
Voice Bonn International (SBI)	2,576	1.6	New	1	New
Sahra Wagenknecht Alliance (BSW)	1,814	1.1	New	1	New
Die PARTEI (PARTEI)	1,452	0.9	▼1.3	1	0
Alliance for Innovation and Justice (BIG)	820	0.5	▼0.7	0	▼1
Pirate Party Germany (Piraten)	59	0.0	▼0.6	0	0
Valid votes	159,458	99.5			
Invalid votes	762	0.5			
Total	160,220	100.0		66	0
Electorate/voter turnout	247,052	64.9	▲7.8		
Source: State Returning Officer

=== State government ===
Four delegates represent the Federal city of Bonn in the Landtag of North Rhine-Westphalia. The last election took place in May 2022. The current delegates are Guido Déus (CDU), Christos Katzidis (CDU), Joachim Stamp (FDP), Tim Achtermeyer (Greens) and Dr. Julia Höller (Greens)

=== Federal government ===
Bonn's constituency is called Bundeswahlkreis Bonn (096). In the German federal election 2017, Ulrich Kelber (SPD) was elected a member of German Federal parliament, the Bundestag by direct mandate. It is his fifth term. Katja Dörner representing Bündnis 90/Die Grünen and Alexander Graf Lambsdorff for FDP were elected as well. Kelber resigned in 2019 because he was appointed Federal Commissioner for Data Protection and Freedom of Information. As Dörner was elected Lord Mayor of Bonn in September 2020, she resigned as a member of parliament after her entry into office.

== Culture ==
Beethoven's birthplace is located in Bonngasse near the market place. Next to the market place is the Old City Hall, built in 1737 in Rococo style, under the rule of Clemens August of Bavaria. It is used for receptions of guests of the city, and as an office for the mayor. Nearby is the Kurfürstliches Schloss, built as a residence for the prince-elector and now the main building of the University of Bonn.

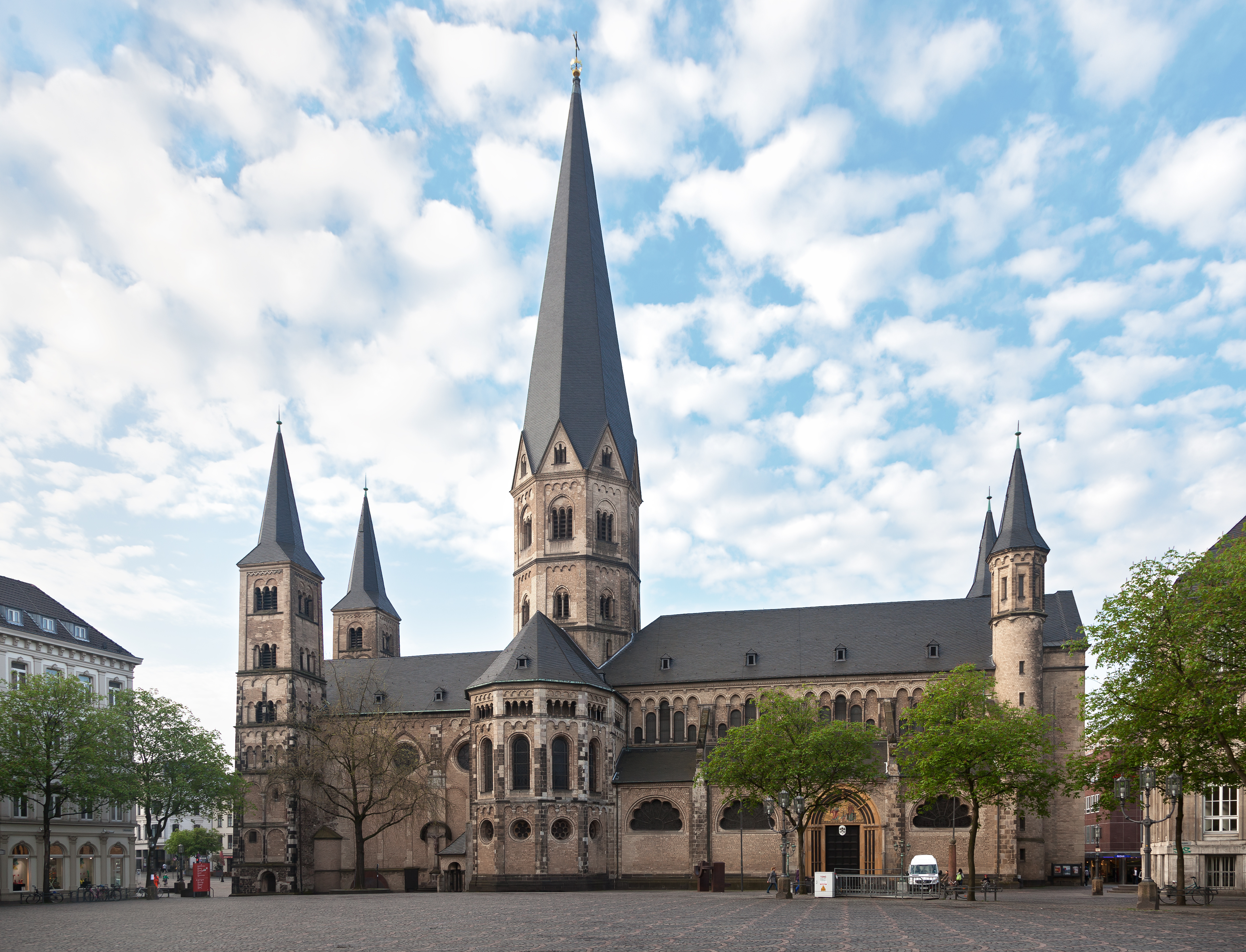
Erected in the 11th and 13th century, the Roman Catholic Minster of Bonn is one of Germany's oldest churches.

The Poppelsdorfer Allee is an avenue flanked by chestnut trees which had the first horsecar of the city. It connects the Kurfürstliches Schloss with the Poppelsdorfer Schloss, a palace that was built as a resort for the prince-electors in the first half of the 18th century, and whose grounds are now a botanical garden (the Botanischer Garten Bonn). This axis is interrupted by a railway line and Bonn Hauptbahnhof, a building erected in 1883/84.

The Beethoven Monument stands on the Münsterplatz, which is flanked by the Bonn Minster, one of Germany's oldest churches.

The three highest structures in the city are the WDR radio mast in Bonn-Venusberg (180 m or 590 ft), the headquarters of the Deutsche Post called Post Tower (162.5 m or 533 ft) and the Langer Eugen (114.7 m or 376 ft), originally offices for Members of the Bundestag, but today home of the United Nations campus at Bonn.

=== Churches ===
- Bonn Minster
- Doppelkirche Schwarzrheindorf built in 1151
- Old Cemetery (Alter Friedhof), one of the best known cemeteries in Germany
- Kreuzbergkirche, built in 1627 with Johann Balthasar Neumann's Heilige Stiege, it is a stairway for Christian pilgrims
- St. Remigius, where Beethoven was baptized

=== Castles and residences ===
- Godesburg fortress ruins
- The Röttgen suburb was once home to Schloss Herzogsfreude, now lost, but once a hunting lodge of elector Clemens August.

=== Modern buildings ===
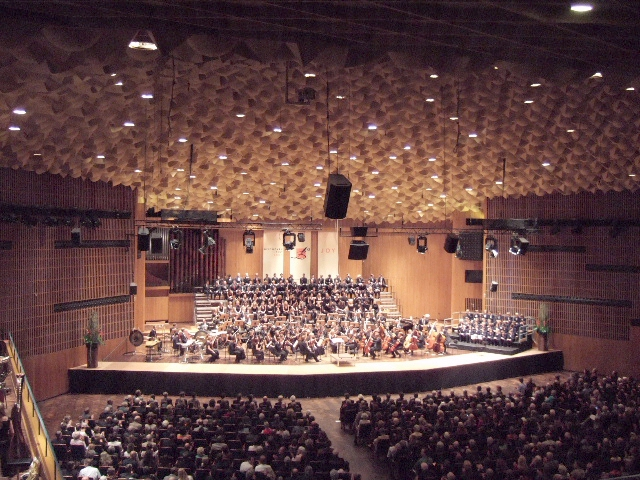
Beethovenhalle

- Beethovenhalle
- Bundesviertel (federal quarter) with many government structures including
  - Post Tower, the tallest building in the state North Rhine-Westphalia, housing the headquarters of Deutsche Post/DHL
  - Maritim Bonn, five-star hotel and convention centre
  - Schürmann-Bau, headquarters of Deutsche Welle
  - Langer Eugen, since 2006 the centre of the United Nations Campus, formerly housing the offices of the members of the German parliament
- Deutsche Telekom headquarters
- Telekom Deutschland headquarters
- Kameha Grand, five-star hotel

=== Museums ===
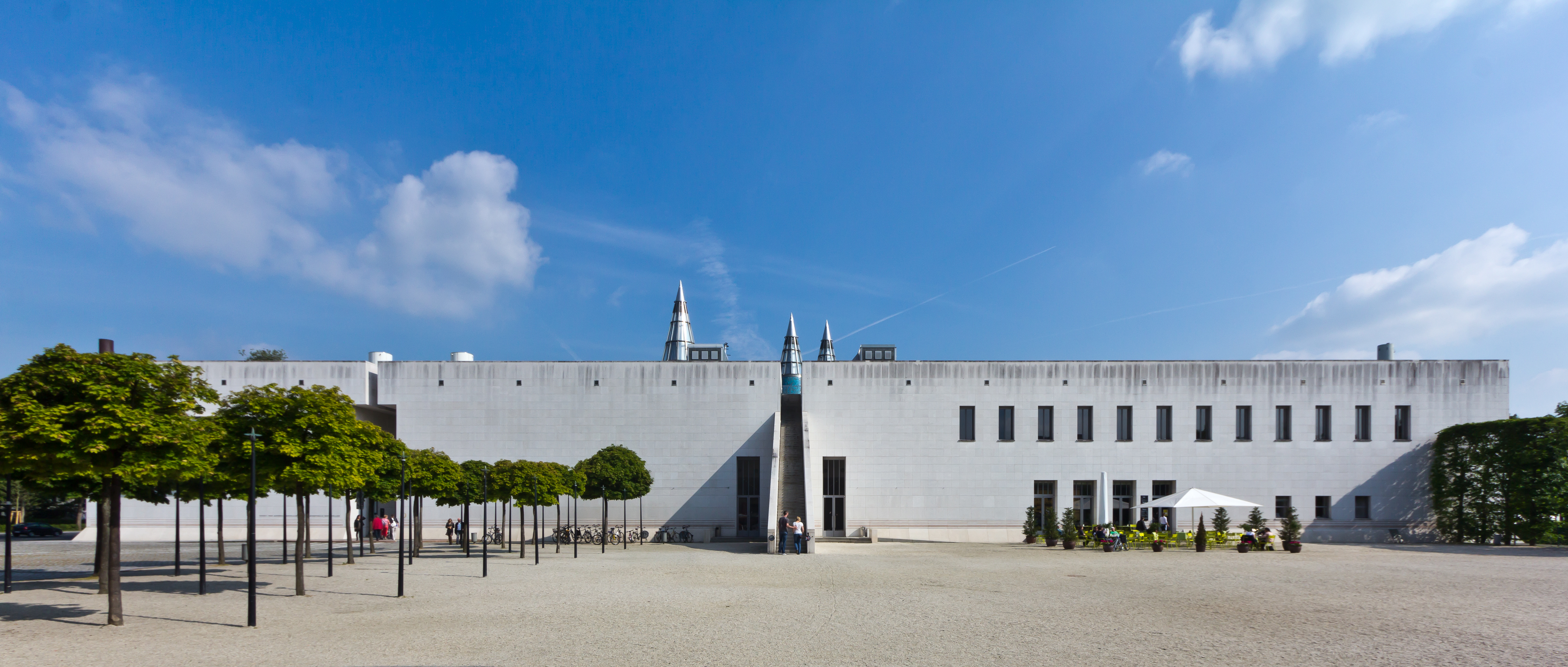
The Bundeskunsthalle focuses on the cultural heritage outside of Germany or Europe, at the crossroads of culture, the arts, and science.

Just as Bonn's other four major museums, the Haus der Geschichte or Museum of the History of the Federal Republic of Germany, is located on the so-called Museumsmeile ("Museum Mile"). The Haus der Geschichte is one of the foremost German museums of contemporary German history, with branches in Berlin and Leipzig. In its permanent exhibition, the Haus der Geschichte presents German history from 1945 until the present, also shedding light on Bonn's own role as former capital of West Germany. Numerous temporary exhibitions emphasize different features, such as Nazism or important personalities in German history.

The Kunstmuseum Bonn or Bonn Museum of Modern Art is an art museum founded in 1947. The Kunstmuseum exhibits both temporary exhibitions and its permanent collection. The latter is focused on Rhenish Expressionism and post-war German art. German artists on display include Georg Baselitz, Joseph Beuys, Hanne Darboven, Anselm Kiefer, Blinky Palermo and Wolf Vostell. The museum owns one of the largest collections of artwork by Expressionist painter August Macke. His work is also on display in the August-Macke-Haus, located in Macke's former home where he lived from 1911 to 1914.

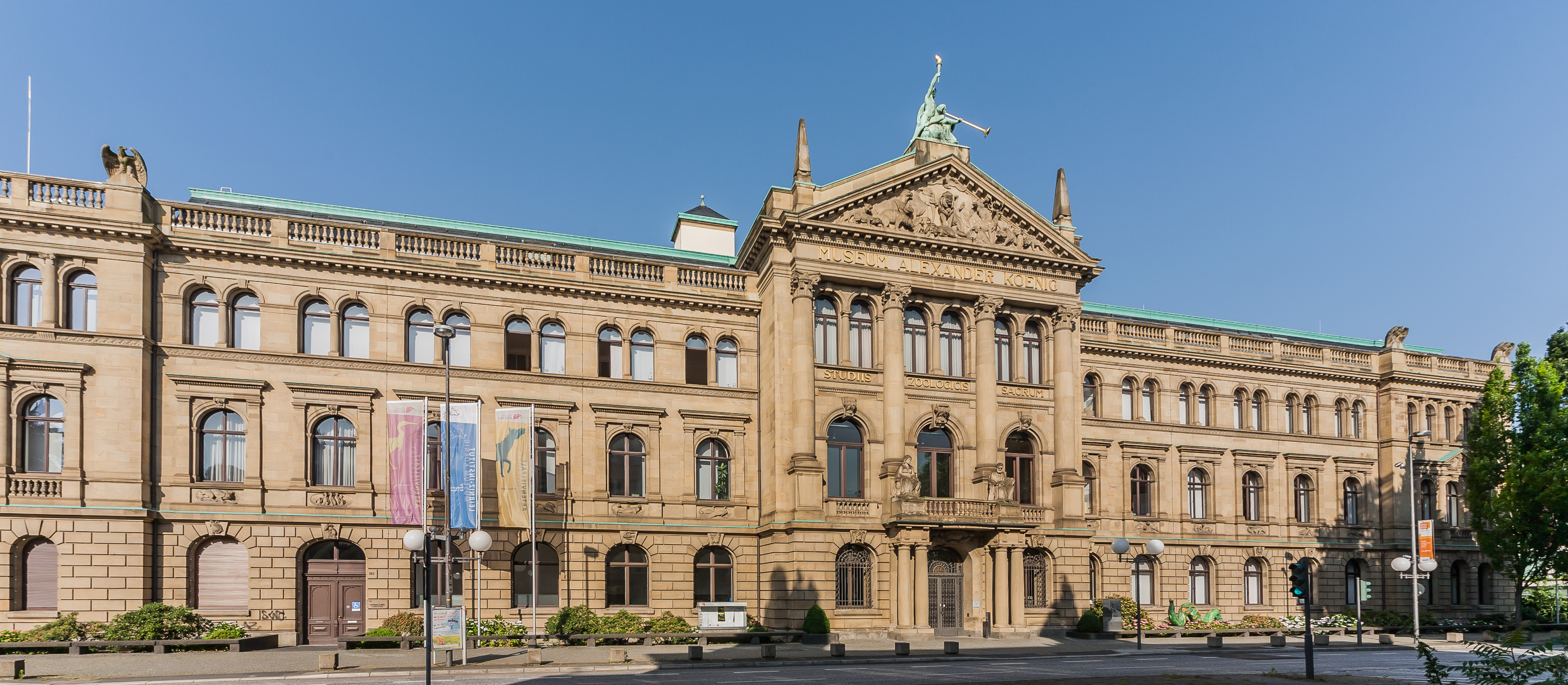
The Museum Koenig is Bonn's natural history museum.

The Bundeskunsthalle (full name: Kunst- und Ausstellungshalle der Bundesrepublik Deutschland or Art and Exhibition Hall of the Federal Republic of Germany), focuses on the crossroads of culture, arts, and science. To date, it attracted more than 17 million visitors. One of its main objectives is to show the cultural heritage outside of Germany or Europe. Next to its changing exhibitions, the Bundeskunsthalle regularly hosts concerts, discussion panels, congresses, and lectures.

The Museum Koenig is Bonn's natural history museum. Affiliated with the University of Bonn, it is also a zoological research institution housing the Leibniz-Institut für Biodiversität der Tiere. Politically interesting, it is on the premises of the Museum Koenig where the Parlamentarischer Rat first met.

The Deutsches Museum Bonn, affiliated with one of the world's foremost science museums, the Deutsches Museum in Munich, is an interactive science museum focusing on post-war German scientists, engineers, and inventions.

Other museums include the Beethoven House, birthplace of Ludwig van Beethoven, the Rheinisches Landesmuseum Bonn (Rhinish Regional Museum Bonn), the Bonn Women's Museum, the Rheinisches Malermuseum and the Arithmeum.

=== Nature ===
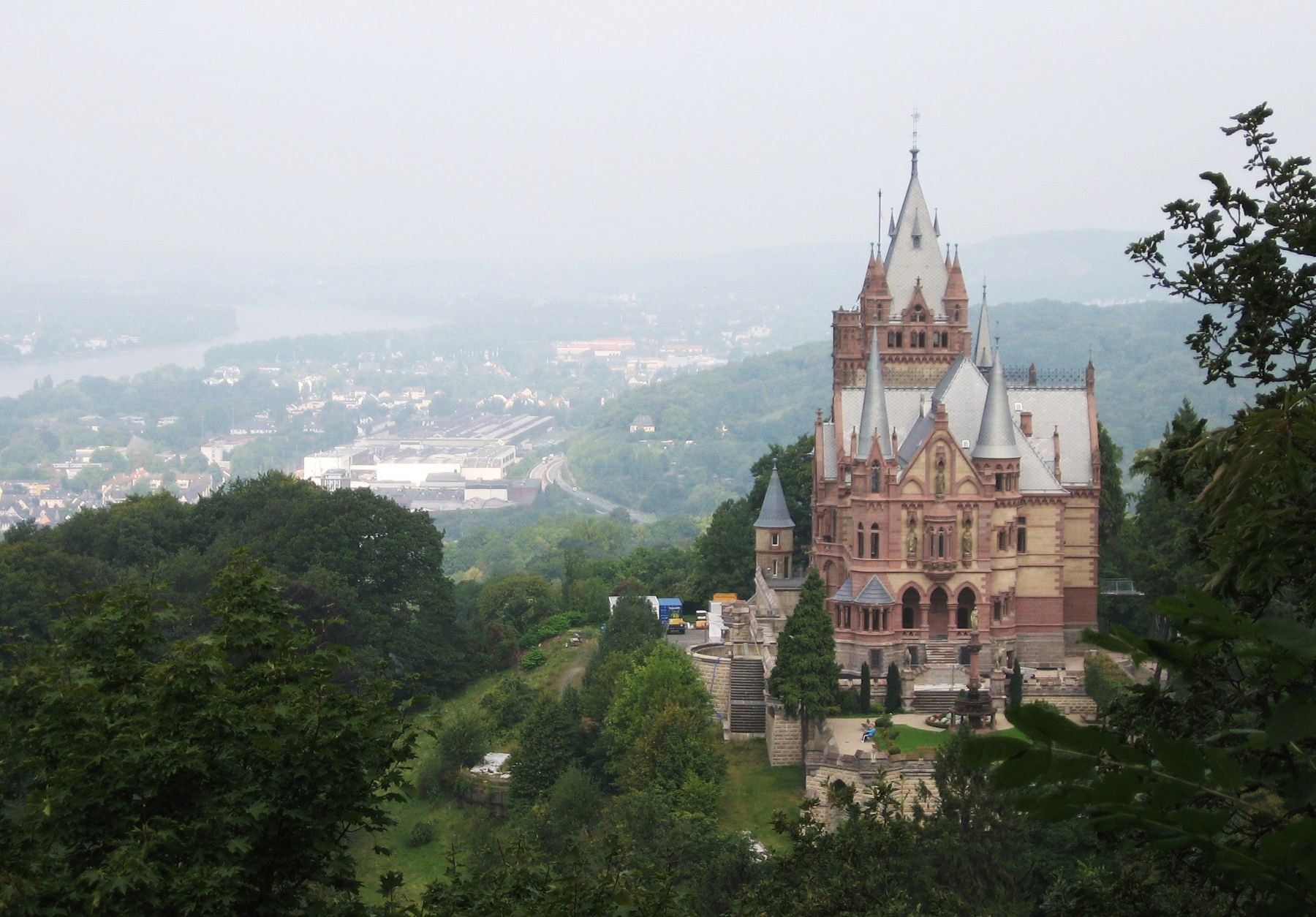
Drachenburg Castle in the Siebengebirge south of Bonn

There are several parks, leisure and protected areas in and around Bonn. The Rheinaue is Bonn's most important leisure park, with its role being comparable to what Central Park is for New York City. It lies on the banks of the Rhine and is the city's biggest park intra muros. The Rhine promenade and the Alter Zoll (Old Toll Station) are in direct neighbourhood of the city centre and are popular amongst both residents and visitors. The Arboretum Park Härle is an arboretum with specimens dating to back to 1870. The Botanischer Garten (Botanical Garden) is affiliated with the university. The natural reserve of Kottenforst is a large area of protected woods on the hills west of the city centre. It is about 40 square kilometres (15 square miles) in area and part of the Rhineland Nature Park (1,045 km^{2} or 403 sq mi).

In the very south of the city, on the border with Wachtberg and Rhineland-Palatinate, there is an extinct volcano, the Rodderberg, featuring a popular area for hikes. Also south of the city, there is the Siebengebirge which is part of the lower half of the Middle Rhine region. The nearby upper half of the Middle Rhine from Bingen to Koblenz is a UNESCO World Heritage Site with more than 40 castles and fortresses from the Middle Ages and important German vineyards.

== Transportation ==
=== Air traffic ===
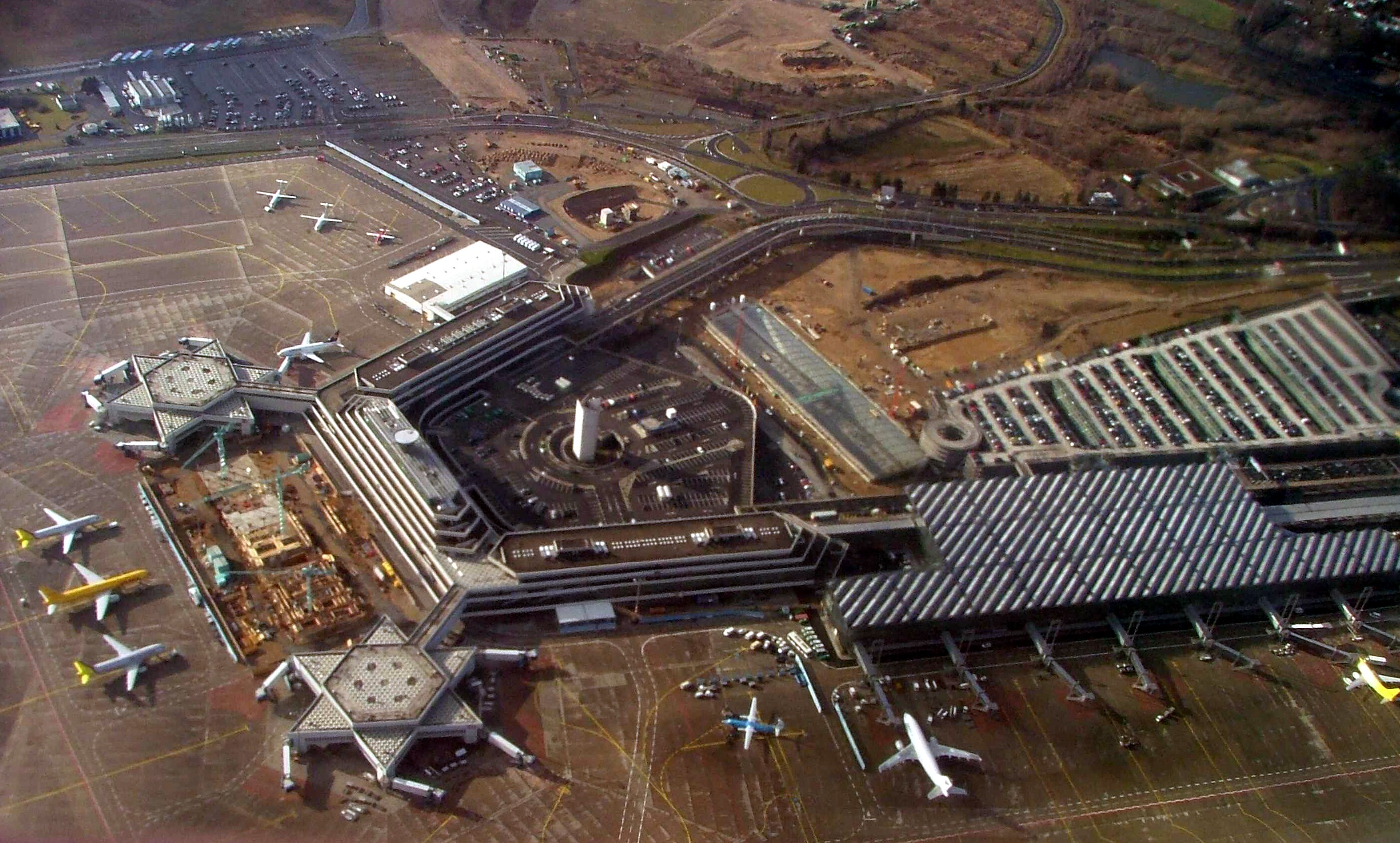
The international airport of Cologne and Bonn (IATA: CGN) is Germany's sixth-largest.

Named after Konrad Adenauer, the first post-war Chancellor of West Germany, Cologne Bonn Airport is situated 15 kilometres (9.3 miles) north-east from the city centre of Bonn. With around 10.3 million passengers passing through it in 2015, it is the seventh-largest passenger airport in Germany and the third-largest in terms of cargo operations. By traffic units, which combines cargo and passengers, the airport is in fifth position in Germany. As of March 2015, Cologne Bonn Airport had services to 115 passenger destinations in 35 countries. The airport is one of Germany's few 24-hour airports, and is a hub for Eurowings and cargo operators FedEx Express and UPS Airlines.

The federal motorway (Autobahn) A59 connects the airport with the city. Long distance and regional trains to and from the airport stop at Cologne/Bonn Airport station. Another major airport within a one-hour drive by car is Düsseldorf International Airport.

=== Rail and bus system ===
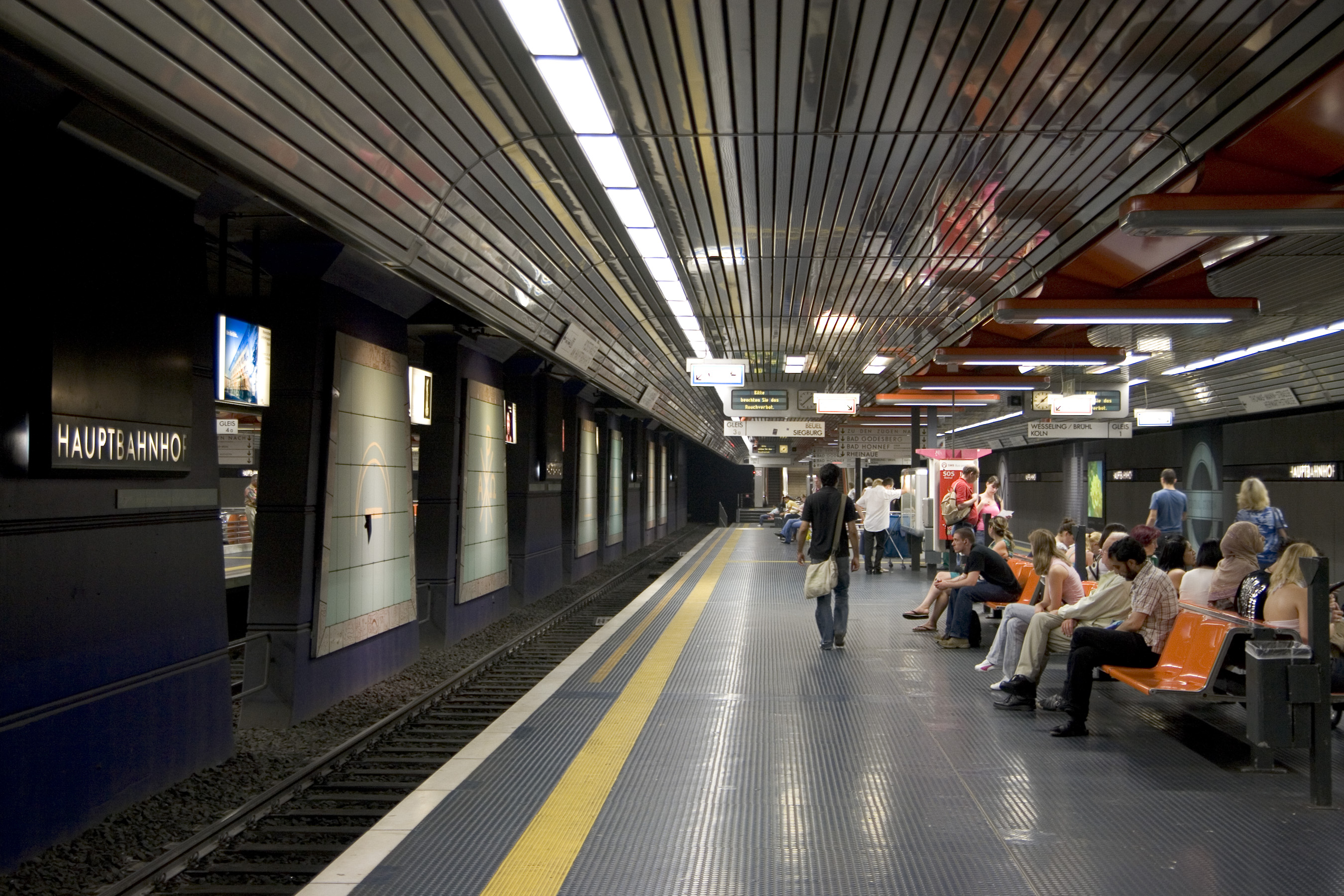
The underground Stadtbahn station at Bonn Hauptbahnhof, Bonn's busiest railway station

Bonn's central railway station, Bonn Hauptbahnhof is the city's main public transportation hub. It lies just outside the old town and near the central university buildings. It is served by regional (S-Bahn and Regionalbahn) and long-distance (IC and ICE) trains. Daily, more than 67,000 people travel via Bonn Hauptbahnhof. In late 2016, around 80 long distance and more than 165 regional trains departed to or from Bonn every day. Another long-distance station, (Siegburg/Bonn), is located in the nearby town of Siegburg and serves as Bonn's station on the high-speed rail line between Cologne and Frankfurt, offering faster connections to Southern Germany. It can be reached by Stadtbahn line 66 (approx. 25 minutes from central Bonn).

Bonn has a Stadtbahn light rail and a tram system. The Bonn Stadtbahn has 4 regular lines that connect the main north–south axis (centre to Bad Godesberg) and quarters east of the Rhine (Beuel and Oberkassel), as well as many nearby towns like Brühl, Wesseling, Sankt Augustin, Siegburg, Königswinter, and Bad Honnef. All lines serve the Central Station and two lines continue to Cologne, where they connect to the Cologne Stadtbahn. The Bonn tram system consists of two lines that connect closer quarters in the south, north and east of Bonn to the Central Station. While the Stadtbahn mostly has its own right-of-way, the tram often operates on general road lanes. A few sections of track are used by both systems. These urban rail lines are supplemented by a bus system of roughly 30 regular lines, especially since some parts of the city like Hardtberg and most of Bad Godesberg completely lack a Stadtbahn/Tram connection. Several lines offer night services, especially during the weekends. Bonn is part of the Verkehrsverbund Rhein-Sieg (Rhine-Sieg Transport Association) which is the public transport association covering the area of the Cologne/Bonn Region.

=== Road network ===
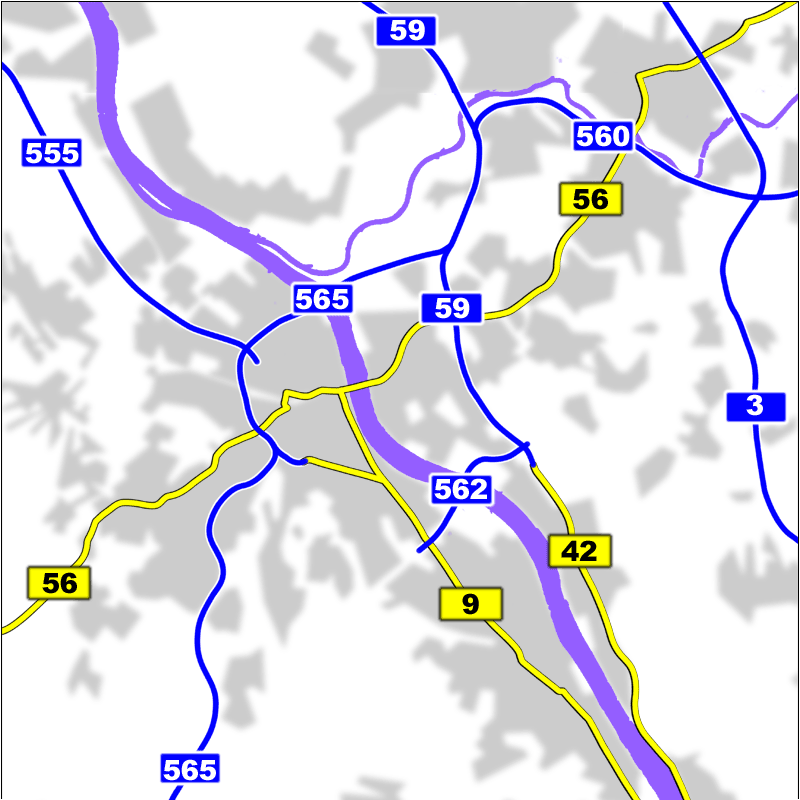
Road network adjacent to Bonn

Four Autobahns run through or are adjacent to Bonn: the A59 (right bank of the Rhine, connecting Bonn with Düsseldorf and Duisburg), the A555 (left bank of the Rhine, connecting Bonn with Cologne), the A562 (connecting the right with the left bank of the Rhine south of Bonn), and the A565 (connecting the A59 and the A555 with the A61 to the southwest). Three Bundesstraßen, which have a general 100 kilometres per hour (62 miles per hour) speed limit in contrast to the Autobahn, connect Bonn to its immediate surroundings (Bundesstraßen B9, B42 and B56).

With Bonn being divided into two parts by the Rhine, three bridges are crucial for inner-city road traffic: the Konrad-Adenauer-Brücke (A562) in the South, the Friedrich-Ebert-Brücke (A565) in the North, and the Kennedybrücke (B56) in the centre. In addition, regular ferries operate between Bonn-Mehlem and Königswinter, Bonn-Bad Godesberg and Königswinter-Niederdollendorf, and Bonn-Graurheindorf and Niederkassel-Mondorf.

=== Port ===
Located in the northern sub-district of Graurheindorf, the inland harbour of Bonn is used for container traffic as well as oversea transport. The annual turnover amounts to around 500,000 t (490,000 long tons; 550,000 short tons). Regular passenger transport occurs to Cologne and Düsseldorf.

== Economy ==
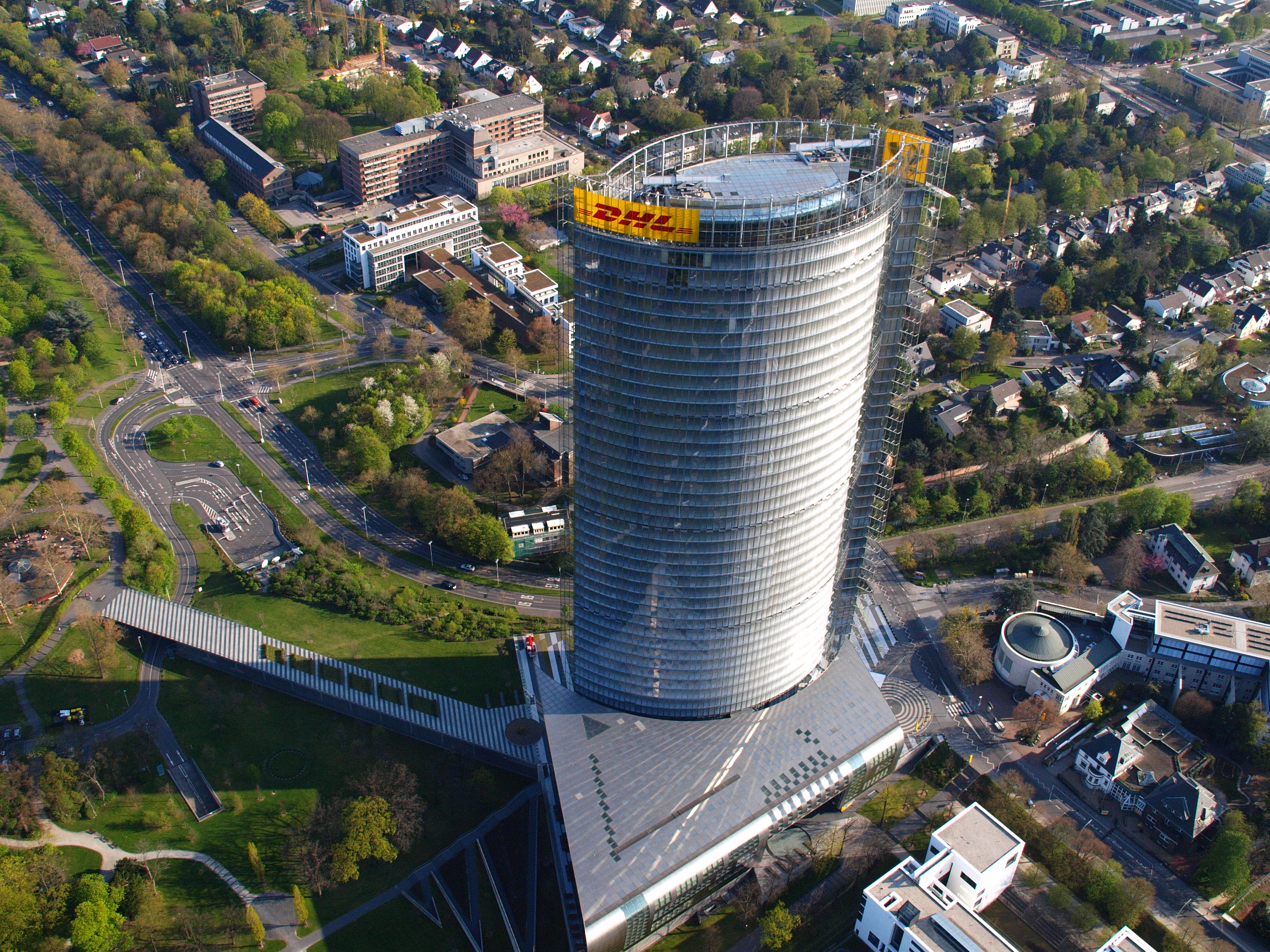
Being one of the biggest employers in the region, Deutsche Post DHL have their headquarters in Bonn.

The head offices of Deutsche Telekom, its subsidiary Telekom Deutschland, Deutsche Post, German Academic Exchange Service, and SolarWorld are in Bonn.

The third largest employer in the city of Bonn is the University of Bonn (including the university clinics) and Stadtwerke Bonn also follows as a major employer.

On the other hand, there are several traditional, nationally known private companies in Bonn such as luxury food producers Verpoorten and Kessko, the Klais organ manufacture and the Bonn flag factory.

The largest confectionery manufacturer in Europe, Haribo, has its founding headquarters (founded in 1920) and a production site in Bonn. Since April 2018, the head office of the company is located in the Rhineland-Palatinate municipality of Grafschaft.

Other companies of supraregional importance are Weck Glaswerke (production site), Fairtrade, Eaton Industries (formerly Klöckner & Moeller), IVG Immobilien, Kautex Textron, SolarWorld, Vapiano and the Doxis.

== Media ==
The regional public broadcaster, WDR, has a broadcast centre and studios in the city. Germany's state-funded television network and public service international broadcaster, Deutsche Welle, is also based in the city which is located the Schürmann-Bau building.

Local newspaper is served by the General-Anzeiger which publishes daily.

== Education ==
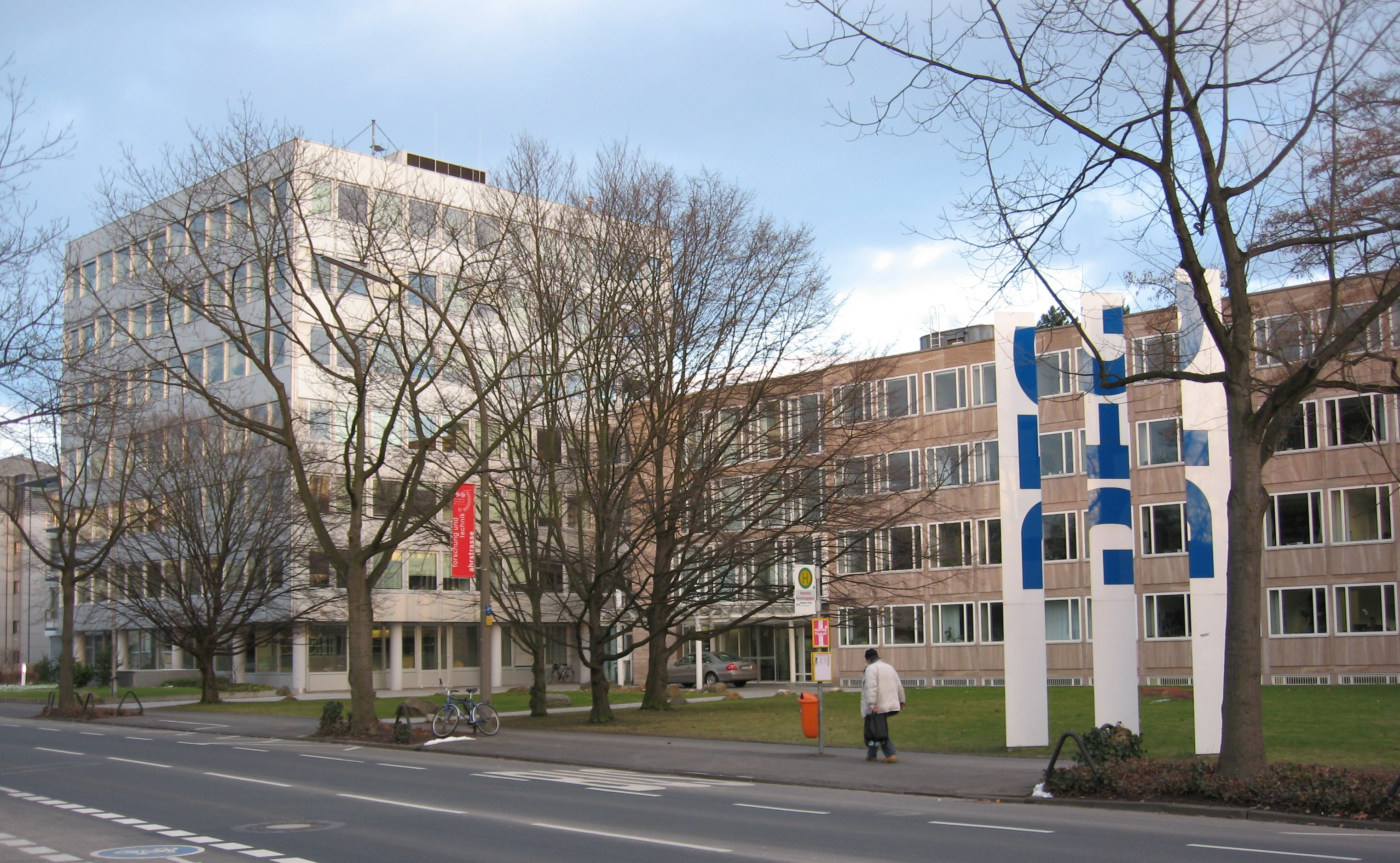
Offices of DFG, an important research funding organisation

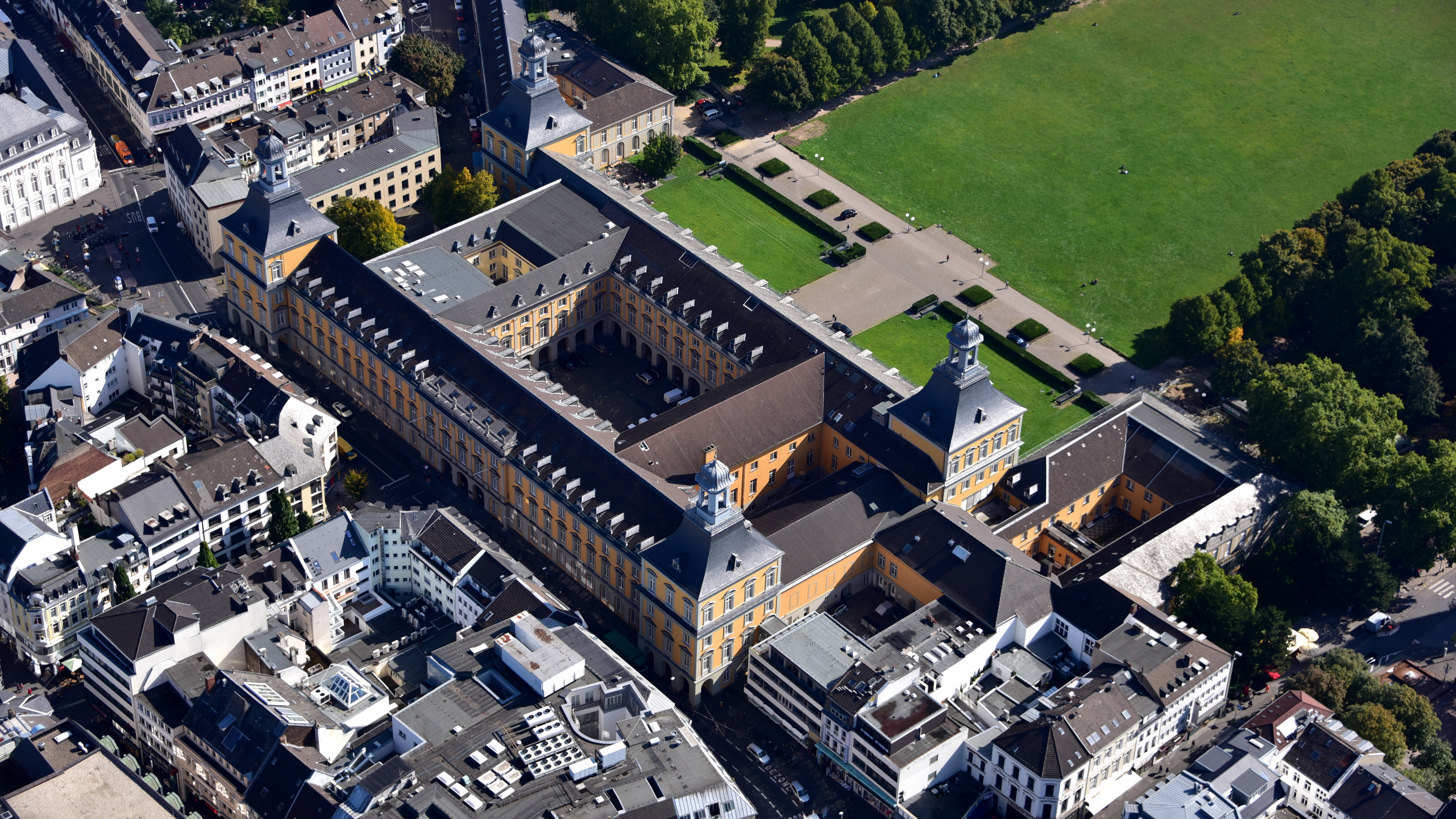
University of Bonn Electoral Palace

The Rheinische Friedrich Wilhelms Universität Bonn (University of Bonn) is one of the largest universities in Germany. It is also the location of the German research institute Deutsche Forschungsgemeinschaft (DFG) offices and of the German Academic Exchange Service (Deutscher Akademischer Austauschdienst – DAAD).

=== Private schools ===
- Aloisiuskolleg, a Jesuit private school in Bad Godesberg with boarding facilities
- Amos-Comenius-Gymnasium, a Protestant private school in Bad Godesberg
- Bonn International School (BIS), a private English-speaking school set in the former American Compound in the Rheinaue, which offers places from kindergarten to 12th grade. It follows the curriculum of the International Baccalaureate.
- Libysch Schule, private Arabic high school
- Independent Bonn International School, (IBIS) private primary school (serving from kindergarten, reception, and years 1 to 6)
- École de Gaulle - Adenauer, private French-speaking school serving grades pre-school ("maternelle") to grade 4 (CM1)
- Kardinal-Frings-Gymnasium (KFG), private catholic school of the Archdiocese of Cologne in Beuel
- Liebfrauenschule (LFS), private catholic school of the Archdiocese of Cologne
- Sankt-Adelheid-Gymnasium, private catholic school of the Archdiocese of Cologne in Beuel
- Clara-Fey-Gymnasium, private Catholic school of the Archdiocese of Cologne in Bad Godesberg
- Ernst-Kalkuhl-Gymnasium, private boarding and day school in Oberkassel
- Otto-Kühne-Schule ("PÄDA"), private day school in Bad Godesberg
- Collegium Josephinum Bonn ("CoJoBo"), private catholic day school
- Akademie für Internationale Bildung, private higher educational facility offering programs for international students

Former schools

- King Fahd Academy, private Islamic school in Bad Godesberg

== Demographics ==
Historical population

Year	Pop.	±% p.a.
1620	4,500	—
1720	6,535	+0.37%
1732	8,015	+1.72%
1760	13,500	+1.88%
1784	12,644	−0.27%
1798	8,837	−2.53%
1808	8,219	−0.72%
1817	10,970	+3.26%
1849	17,688	+1.50%
1871	26,030	+1.77%
1890	39,805	+2.26%
1910	87,978	+4.05%
1919	91,410	+0.43%
1925	90,249	−0.21%
1933	98,659	+1.12%
1939	100,788	+0.36%

Year	Pop.	±% p.a.
1950	115,394	+1.24%
1961	143,850	+2.02%
1965	277,305	+17.83%
1970	275,722	−0.11%
1975	283,717	+0.57%
1980	288,167	+0.31%
1985	290,801	+0.18%
1990	292,234	+0.10%
1995	291,431	−0.06%
2000	302,247	+0.73%
2005	312,818	+0.69%
2010	324,899	+0.76%
2015	318,809	−0.38%
2020	330,579	+0.73%
2025	323,587	−0.43%

Population size may be affected by changes in administrative divisions.
Source: Landesdatabank Nordrhein-Westfalen (1965-2025)

Population development since 1620

As of 2011, about 70% of the population was entirely of German origin, while about 100,000 people, equating to roughly 30%, were at least partly of non-German origin. The city is one of the fastest-growing municipalities in Germany and the 18th most populous city in the country. Bonn's population is predicted to surpass the populations of Wuppertal and Bochum before the year 2030.

The following list shows the largest groups of origin of minorities with "migration background" in Bonn as of 31 December 2021.

Rank	Migration background	Population (31 December 2022)
1	Syria	9,428
2	Turkey	8,254
3	Poland	6,879
4	Morocco	5,921
5	Italy	3,976
6	Russia	3,933
7	Iran	3,341
8	Spain	3,282
9	Iraq	2,744
10	Romania	2,429
11	India	2,216
12	France	2,198
13	Afghanistan	2,043
14	Ukraine	1,918
15	United States	1,823
16	Bulgaria	1,781
17	China	1,764
18	Tunisia	1,736
19	Greece	1,657
20	Kosovo	1,635
21	Kazakhstan	1,579
22	United Kingdom	1,343
23	Netherlands	1,260
24	Croatia	1,220

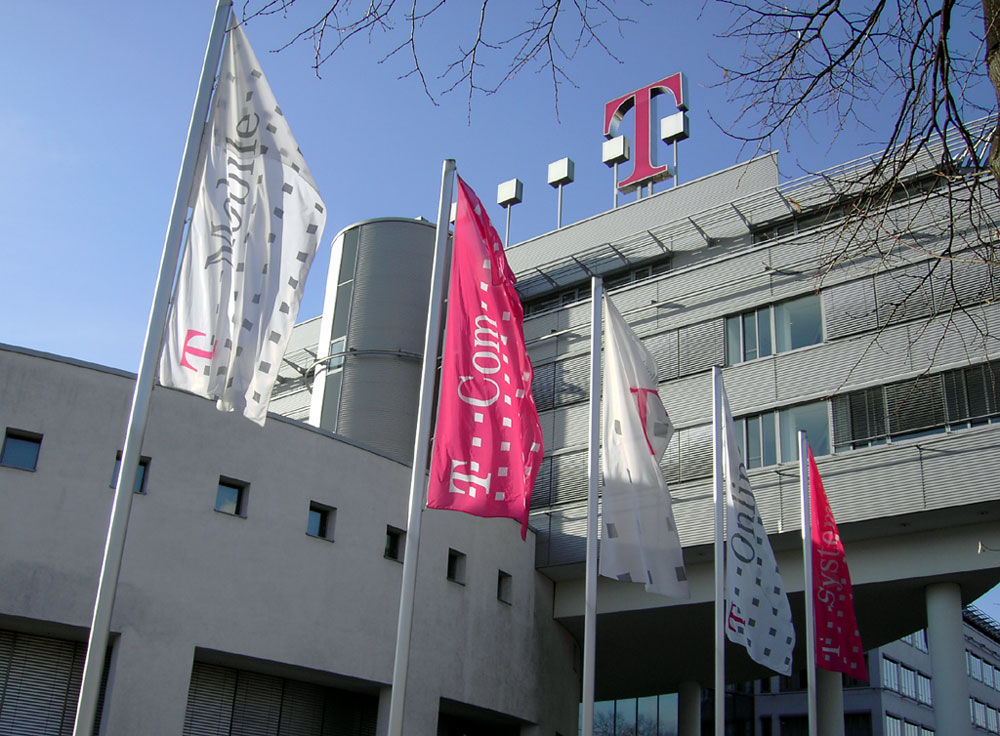
Deutsche Telekom head office

== Sports ==
Bonn is home of the Telekom Baskets Bonn, the only basketball club in Germany that owns its arena, the Telekom Dome.

The city also has a semi-professional football team Bonner SC which was formed in 1965 through the merger of Bonner FV and Tura Bonn.

The Bonn Gamecocks American football team play at the 12,000-capacity Stadion Pennenfeld.

The successful German Baseball team Bonn Capitals are also found in the city of Bonn.

The headquarters of the International Paralympic Committee has been located in Bonn since 1999.

== International relations ==
Since 1983, the City of Bonn has established friendship relations with the City of Tel Aviv, Israel, and since 1988 Bonn, in former times the residence of the Princes Electors of Cologne, and Potsdam, Germany, the formerly most important residential city of the Prussian rulers, have established a city-to-city partnership.

Central Bonn is surrounded by a number of traditional towns and villages which were independent up to several decades ago. As many of those communities had already established their own contacts and partnerships before the regional and local reorganisation in 1969, the Federal City of Bonn now has a dense network of city district partnerships with European partner towns.

The city district of Bonn is a partner of the English university city of Oxford, England, UK (since 1947), of Budafok, District XXII of Budapest, Hungary (since 1991) and of Opole, Poland (officially since 1997; contacts were established 1954).

The district of Bad Godesberg has established partnerships with Saint-Cloud in France, Frascati in Italy, Windsor and Maidenhead in England, UK and Kortrijk in Belgium; a friendship agreement has been signed with the town of Yalova, Turkey.

The district of Beuel on the right bank of the Rhine and the city district of Hardtberg foster partnerships with towns in France: Mirecourt and Villemomble.

Moreover, the city of Bonn has developed a concept of international co-operation and maintains sustainability oriented project partnerships in addition to traditional city twinning, among others with Minsk in Belarus, Ulaanbaatar in Mongolia, Bukhara in Uzbekistan, Chengdu in China and La Paz in Bolivia.

=== Twin towns – sister cities ===
Bonn is twinned with:

- Bukhara, Uzbekistan (1999)
- Cape Coast, Ghana (2012)
- Chengdu, China (2009)
- Kherson, Ukraine (2023)
- Minsk, Belarus (1993)
- La Paz, Bolivia (1996)
- Potsdam, Germany (1988)
- Tel Aviv, Israel (1983)
- Ulaanbaatar, Mongolia (1993)

Bonn city district is twinned with:

- Oxford, United Kingdom (1947)
- Budafok-Tétény (Budapest), Hungary (1991)

For twin towns of other city districts, see Bad Godesberg, Beuel and Hardtberg.

== Notable people ==
=== Pre–20th century ===
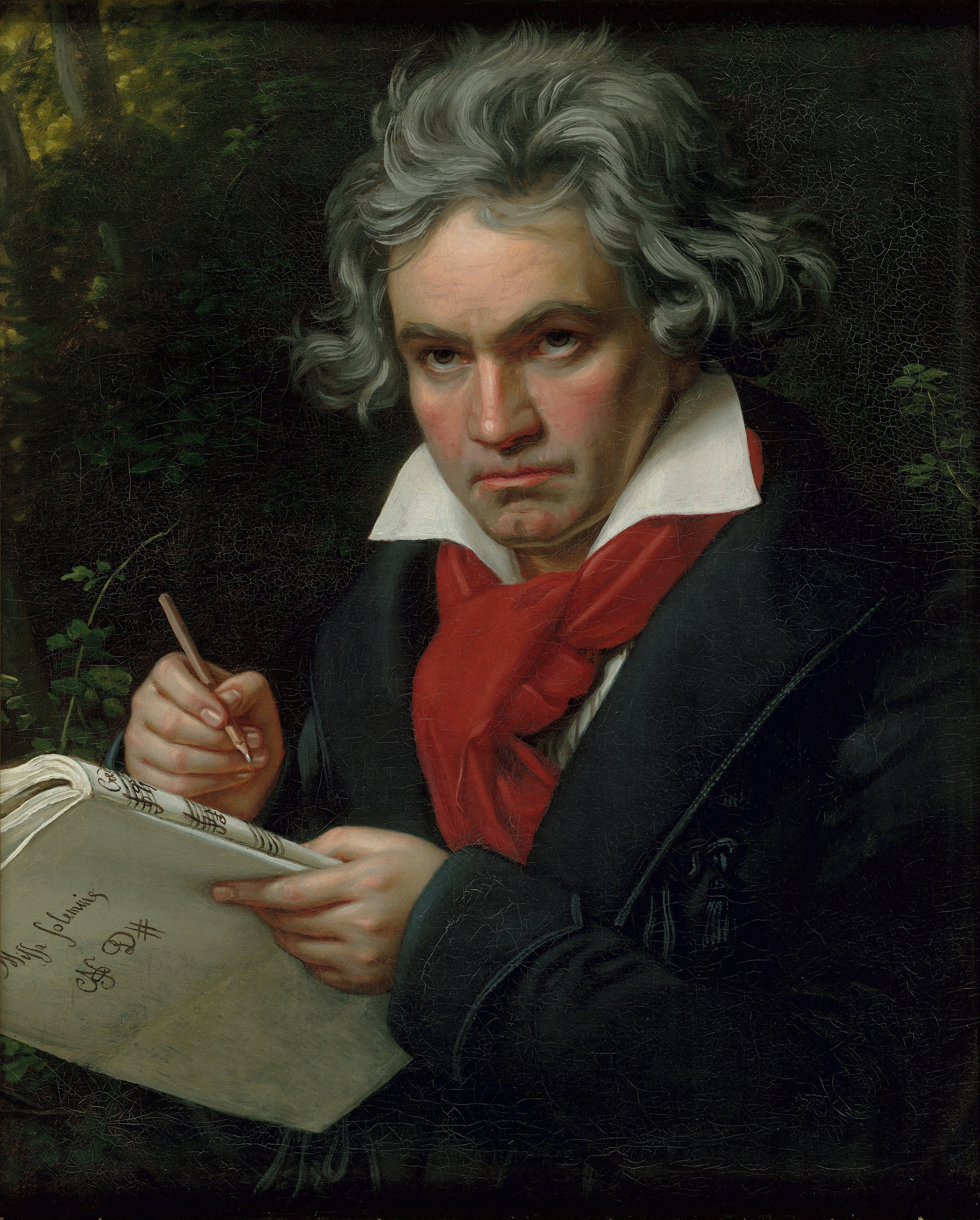
Ludwig van Beethoven

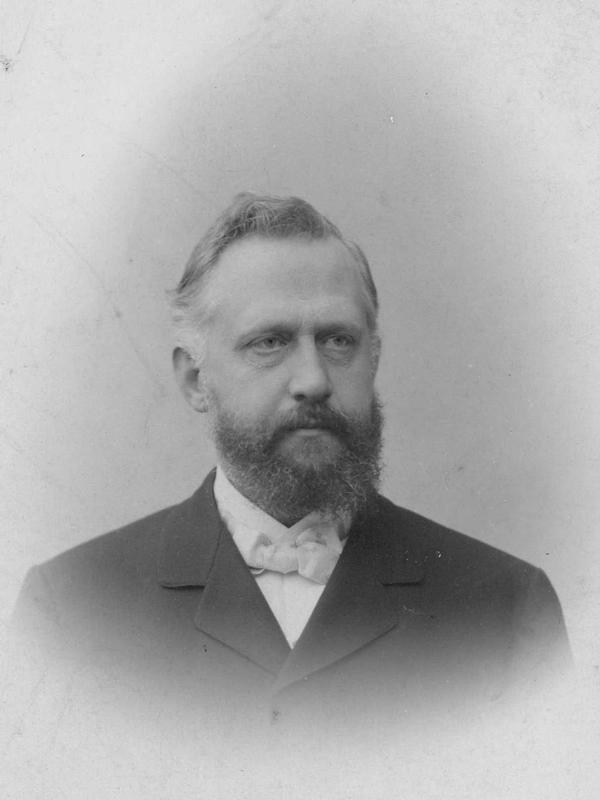
Alexander Koenig

- Johann Peter Salomon (1745–1815), musician
- Franz Anton Ries (1755–1846), violinist and violin teacher
- Ludwig van Beethoven (1770–1827), composer
- Salomon Oppenheim, Jr. (1772–1828), banker
- Peter Joseph Lenné (1789–1866), gardener and landscape architect
- Friedrich von Gerolt (1797–1879), diplomat
- Karl Joseph Simrock (1802–1876), writer and specialist in German
- Wilhelm Neuland (1806–1889), composer and conductor
- Johanna Kinkel (1810–1858), composer and writer
- Moses Hess (1812–1875), philosopher and writer
- Johann Gottfried Kinkel (1815–1882), theologian, writer, and politician
- Alexander Kaufmann (1817–1893), author and archivist
- Leopold Kaufmann (1821–1898), mayor
- Julius von Haast (1822–1887), New Zealand explorer and professor of geology
- Dietrich Brandis (1824–1907), botanist
- Balduin Möllhausen (1825–1905), traveler and writer
- Maurus Wolter (1825–1890), Benedictine, founder and first abbot of the Abbey of Beuron and Beuronese Congregation
- August Reifferscheid (1835–1887), philologist
- Antonius Maria Bodewig (1839–1915), Jesuit missionary and founder
- Nathan Zuntz (1847–1920), physician
- Alexander Koenig (1858–1940), zoologist, founder of Museum Koenig in Bonn
- Alfred Philippson (1864–1953), geographer
- Johanna Elberskirchen (1864–1943), writer and activist
- Max Alsberg (1877–1933), lawyer
- Kurt Wolff (1887–1963), publisher
- Hans Riegel Sr. (1893–1945), entrepreneur, founder of Haribo
- Eduard Krebsbach (1894–1947), SS doctor in Nazi Mauthausen concentration camp, executed for war crimes
- Paul Kemp (1896–1953), actor

=== 1900–1949 ===
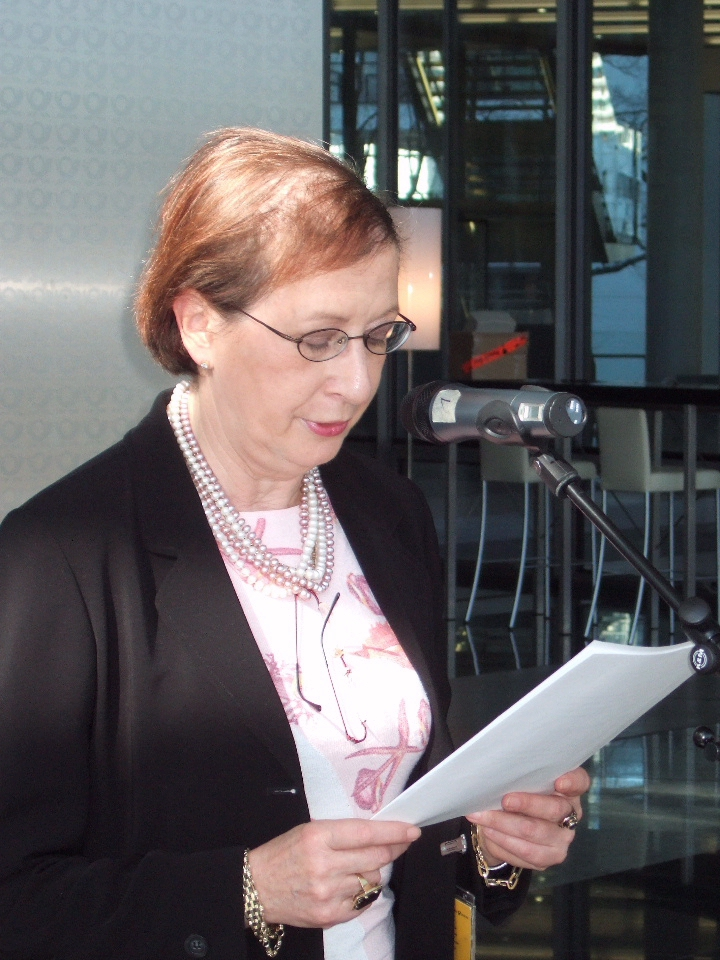
Heide Simonis

- Hermann Josef Abs (1901–1994), board member of the Deutsche Bank
- Paul Ludwig Landsberg (1901–1944), in Sachsenhausen concentration camp, philosopher
- Heinrich Lützeler (1902–1988), philosopher, art historian, and literary scholar
- Frederick Stephani (1903–1962), film director and screenwriter
- Helmut Horten (1909–1987), entrepreneur
- Theodor Schieffer (1910–1992), historian and medievalist
- Irene Sänger-Bredt (1911–1983), mathematician and physicist
- E. F. Schumacher (1911–1977), economist
- Karl-Theodor Molinari (1915–1993), General and founding chairman of the German Armed Forces Association
- Karlrobert Kreiten (1916–1943), pianist
- Hans Walter Zech-Nenntwich (born 1916), Second Polish Republic, SS Cavalry member and war criminal
- Walther Killy (1917–1985), German literary scholar, Der Killy
- Hannjo Hasse (1921–1983), actor
- Walter Gotell (1924–1997), actor
- J. Heinrich Matthaei (1929–2025), biochemist
- Walter Eschweiler (born 1935), football referee
- Alexandra Cordes (1935–1986), writer
- Joachim Bißmeier (born 1936), actor
- Roswitha Esser (born 1941), canoeist, gold medal winner at the Olympic Games in 1964 and 1968, Sportswoman of the Year 1964
- Heide Simonis (1943–2023), author and politician (SPD), Prime Minister of Schleswig-Holstein (1993–2005)
- Paul Alger (1943–2025), football player
- Johannes Mötsch (born 1949), archivist and historian
- Klaus Ludwig (born 1949), race car driver

=== 1950–1999 ===
- Günter Ollenschläger (born 1951), medical and science journalist
- Hannes Bongartz (born 1951), football player and coach
- Ivo Ringe (born 1951), German artist, Concrete Art Painter
- Christa Goetsch (born 1952), politician (Alliance '90 / The Greens)
- Michael Meert (born 1953), film author and director
- Thomas de Maizière (born 1954), politician (CDU), former Minister of Defense and of the Interior
- Gerd Faltings (born 1954), mathematician, Fields Medal winner
- Olaf Manthey (born 1955), former touring car racing driver
- Michael Kühnen (1955–1991), Neo-Nazi
- Roger Willemsen (1955–2016), publicist, author, essayist, and presenter
- Norman Rentrop (born 1957), publisher, author, and investor
- Markus Maria Profitlich (born 1960), comedian and actor
- Guido Westerwelle (1961–2016), politician (FDP), Foreign Minister and Vice Chancellor of Germany from 2009 to 2011
- Mathias Dopfner (born 1963), chief executive officer of Axel Springer AG
- Nikolaus Blome (born 1963), journalist
- Maxim Kontsevich (born 1964), mathematician, Fields Medal winner
- Johannes B. Kerner (born 1964), TV presenter, Abitur at the Aloisiuskolleg, and studied in Bonn
- Anthony Baffoe (born 1965), football player, sports presenter, and actor
- Sonja Zietlow (born 1968), TV presenter
- Burkhard Garweg (born 1968), member of the Red Army Faction
- Felix Marggraf (born 1970), TV director
- Sabriye Tenberken (born 1970), Tibetologist, founder of Braille Without Borders
- Thorsten Libotte (born 1972), writer
- Tamara Gräfin von Nayhauß (born 1972), television presenter
- Silke Bodenbender (born 1974), actress
- Juli Zeh (born 1974), writer
- Oliver Mintzlaff (born 1975), track and field athlete and sports manager, CEO of RB Leipzig
- Markus Dieckmann (born 1976), beach volleyball player
- Bernadette Heerwagen (born 1977), actress
- Melanie Amann (born 1978), journalist
- Bushido (born 1978), musician and rapper
- Sonja Fuss (born 1978), football player
- DJ Manian (born 1978), DJ of Cascada and owner of Zooland Records
- Andreas Tölzer (born 1980), judoka
- Jens Hartwig (born 1980), actor
- Natalie Horler (born 1981), front woman of the Dance Project Cascada
- Marcel Ndjeng (born 1982), football player
- Marc Zwiebler (born 1984), badminton player
- Benjamin Barg (born 1984), football player
- Alexandros Margaritis (born 1984), race car driver
- Ken Miyao (born 1986), pop singer
- Felix Reda (born 1986), politician
- Peter Scholze (born 1987), mathematician, Fields Medal winner
- Célia Šašić (born 1988), football player
- Luke Mockridge (born 1989), comedian and author
- Pius Heinz (born 1989), poker player, 2011 WSOP Main Event champion
- Jonas Wohlfarth-Bottermann (born 1990), basketball player
- Levina (born 1991), singer
- Bienvenue Basala-Mazana (born 1992), football player
- Kim Petras (born 1992), pop singer and songwriter
- Annika Beck (born 1994), tennis player
- James Hyndman (born 1962), stage actor
- Konstanze Klosterhalfen (born 1997), track and field athlete

=== 21st century ===
- Alvar Goetze (born 2000), actor
- Anny Ogrezeanu (born 2001), singer and The Voice of Germany winner 2022
