= Meert =

Meert is a surname. Notable people with the surname include:

- Henri Meert (1920–2006), Belgian footballer
- Michael Meert (born 1953), German film director
- Pieter Meert (c. 1620–1669), Flemish Baroque painter
- Stijn Meert (born 1978), Belgian footballer and manager
- Joseph Meert (1905 - 1989), American artist
- Joseph G. Meert (born 1957), American geologist

== See also ==
- Mert (given name)
