= Rheinisches Malermuseum =

Art museum in Germany

Coordinates: 50°44′8″N 7°5′38″E

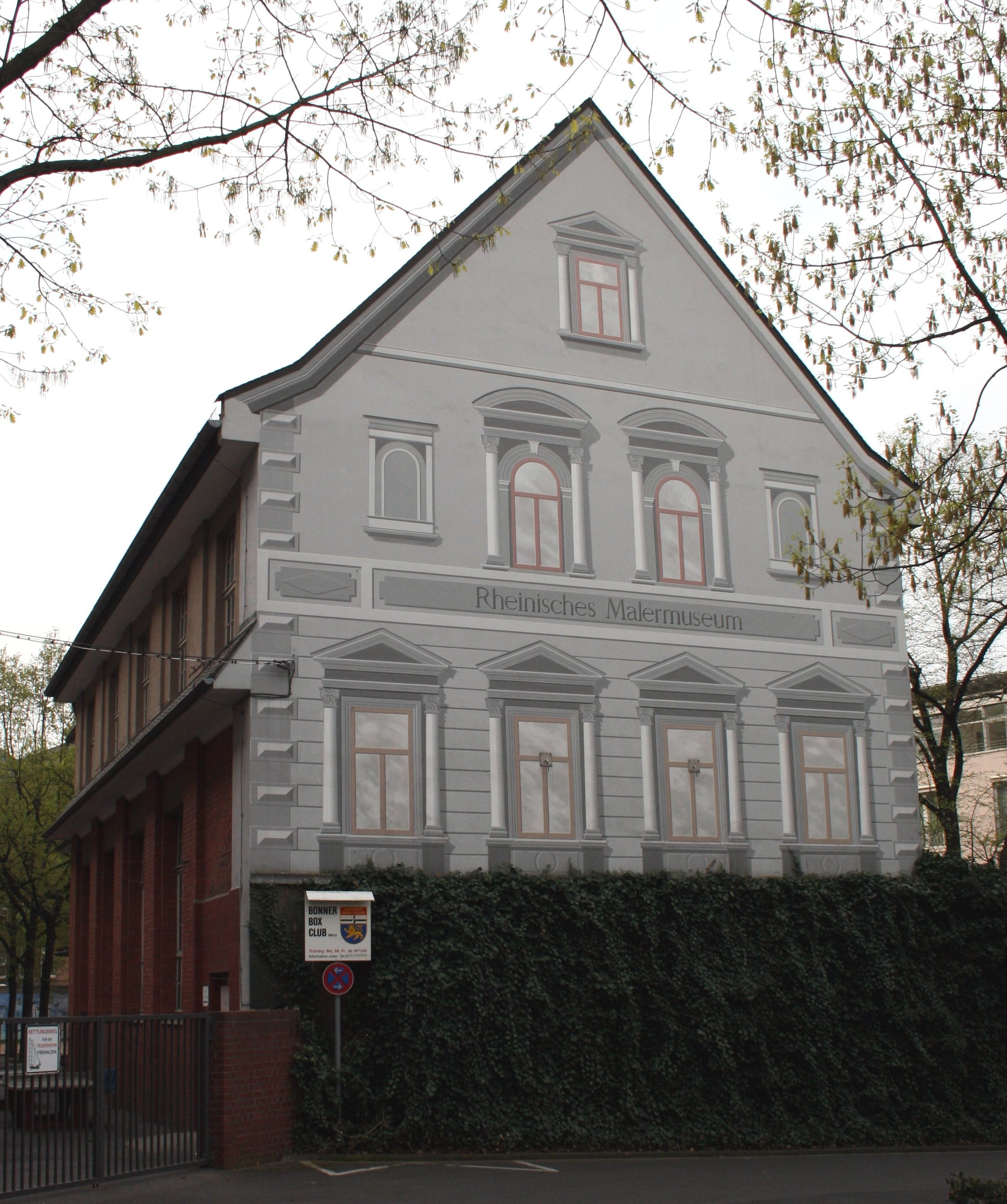

The Rheinisches Malermuseum is an art museum in Bonn, Germany. The museum is owned by a private association and has exhibits on forgotten artistic techniques and tools of the painter. It was established in 1985.

== Sponsorship and foundation ==
First plans for the foundation of such a museum existed already in 1979. With the foundation of a "Förderverein Rheinisches Malermuseum Bonn e.V." in 1985, more concrete plans for the design and financing could begin. Through membership in the Förderverein, retired master painters in particular were involved in the conception, construction and maintenance of the exhibition. The museum was opened on November 10, 1989.

== Exhibition ==
The basis of the collection presented in the museum comes from the inheritance of a Bonn master painter. The detailed depiction of a painter's workshop around 1900, including the tools, paint mills, brushes, paints and other equipment in use at the time, forms the center of the small exhibition. Various techniques of the painter's craft are demonstrated by means of different designs for murals, ceilings and facade designs.

The history of the Bonn Guild of Painters and Decorators comprises another section of the exhibition. On the basis of flags, documents and invoices of the formerly independent guilds of Bonn, Bad Godesberg and the Rhein-Sieg district, the visitor gets an impression of the self-confidence of the painters' and decorators' trade in the Rhineland at that time. The original silver guild cup - a work from 1896 - is the showpiece of this exhibition area.

== Location ==
The museum is located at Berliner Platz 35-39, in the old painters' hall on the second floor of a former vocational school. Today, the separate building houses the gymnasium of the now closed Pestalozzi School, a former open all-day special school. Athletes from the Bonn Boxing Club train there. As an eye-catcher, the painted exterior façade from the Wilhelminian period is an advertisement for the museum that is visible from afar.
