= Felix Marggraff =

German television director

Felix Marggraff (born 6 August 1970 in Bonn, Germany) is a German TV director for sports and events.

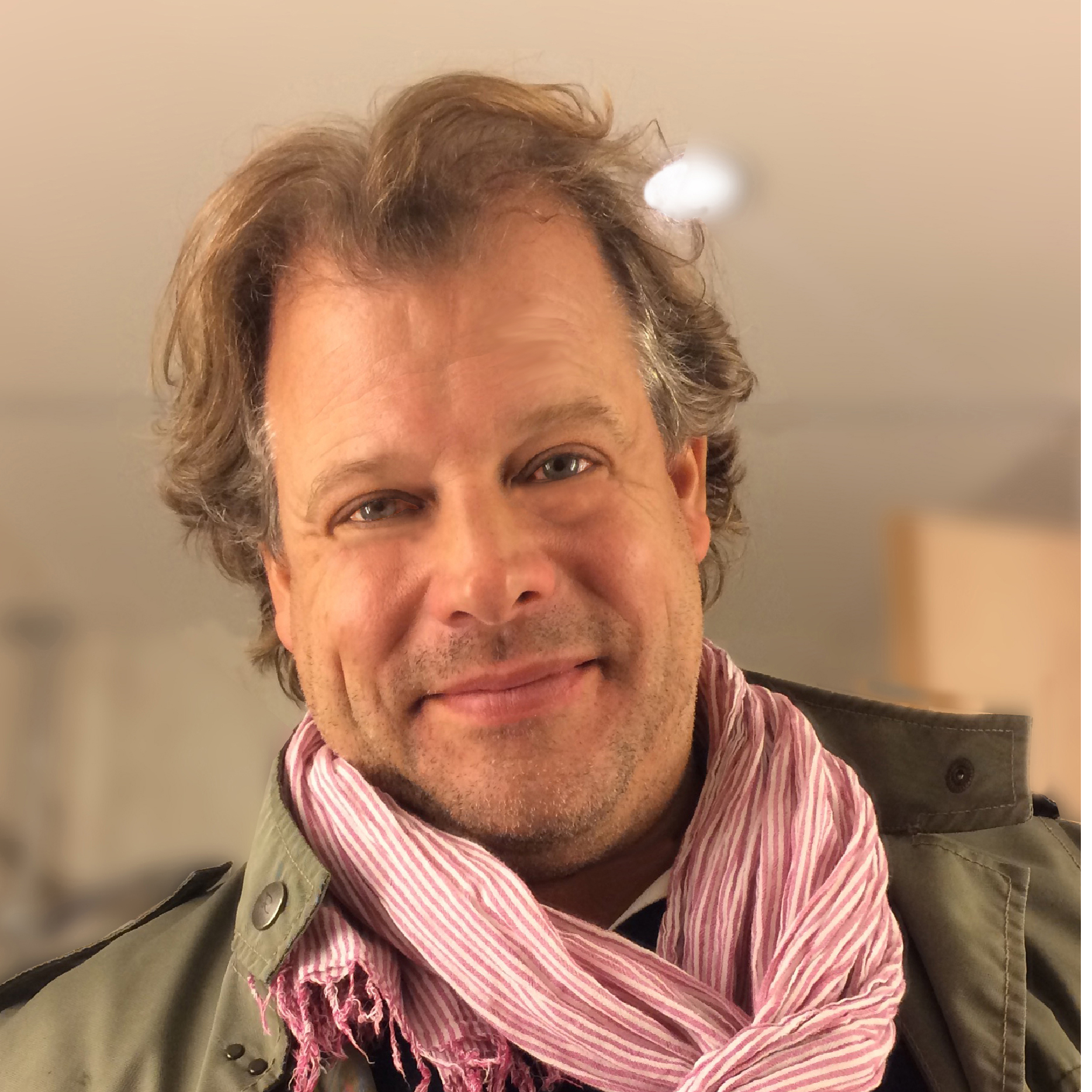
Felix Marggraff

== Life and career ==
Marggraff is TV director for international TV formats. He mainly focuses on Sports TV Production. One of the highlights of his creative work at international Sports Events was directing the World Feed of the Solheim Cup 2015.

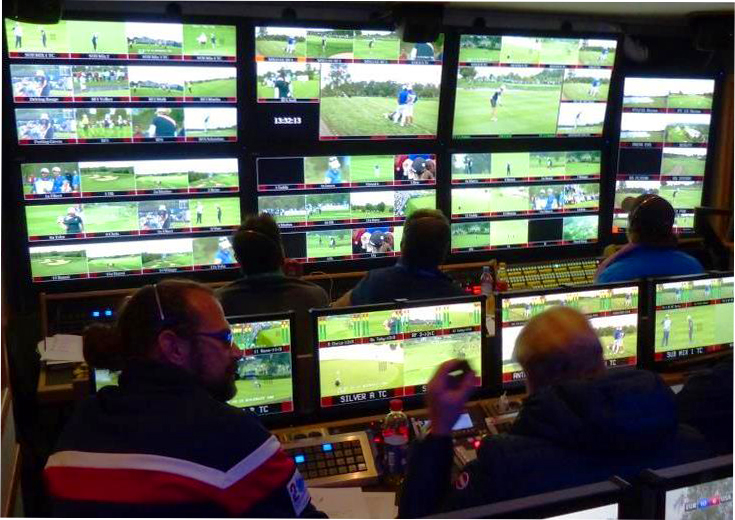
Worldfeed Production Solheim Cup 2015

Other formats where he made an appearance are the transmission of the golfing events "Duel at Jinsha Lake" and "The Match at Mission Hills" where two world class golfers Tiger Woods and Rory McIlroy competed against each other in China.

He is Senior TV director of the "Ladies European Tour" which makes him one of the few golf directors in Europe.

Within the scope of ATP and WTA he appeared as World Feed director at various tournaments including Dubai, Estoril, Stuttgart, Hamburg and Dusseldorf.

Together with ISB he was awarded the Sportel Golden Podium Award for his work as a live TV director at the European Games in Baku 2015.

In 2019 he directed the Badminton venue at the European Games in Minsk, Belarus.

Felix Marggraff together with his production company LMC LiveMotionConcept was responsible for the unilateral virtual graphics at the swimming events of the 2000 Olympic Games in Sydney when for the first time graphical elements as a world record line and names of athletes were superimposed on the water in the live camera feed. Specially calibrated tripods and modified lenses were used to generate these tracked graphics in real time.

Other participations at upcoming Olympic Games followed where Marggraff together with LMC among other things supplied the Antelope Ultra Slow Motion Camera System for the host broadcaster OBS. Felix Marggraff originated the Antelope Camera Technology as well as the brand Antelope in 2006 to become a TV production standard at many international TV productions.

Another major milestone in Marggraff‘s career was his contribution at the Red Bull Air Race World Championship where he ran a team captain position during the years 2004-2010. Once again he was in charge of the virtual graphical visualization of the racetrack, the patented Dartfish analysis tool and at a later stage the supply of the Antelope Camera technology.

== Awards ==
- Sports Emmy Award 2009 Outstanding Technical Team Remote Red Bull Air Race World Championships
- Sportel Golden Podium Award 2015 Innovative Use of HSSM Mini Cameras

== Works (excerpt) ==
- ATP Tennis, various tournaments
- Ladies European Tour Golf, various tournaments
- Smart Beach Tour, various tournaments
- Schueco Open Golf, Düsseldorf & Hamburg
- The Match at Mission Hills, Mission Hills, Hainan Island, China
- The Duel at Jinsha Lake, Zhengzhou, Henan Province, China
- European Games 2015, Baku, Azerbaijan
- Solheim Cup 2015, Sankt Leon Rot, Germany
- European Games 2019, Minsk, Belarus
- World Games 2022, Birmingham, Alabama, USA
