= Tim Achtermeyer =

German politician (born 1993)

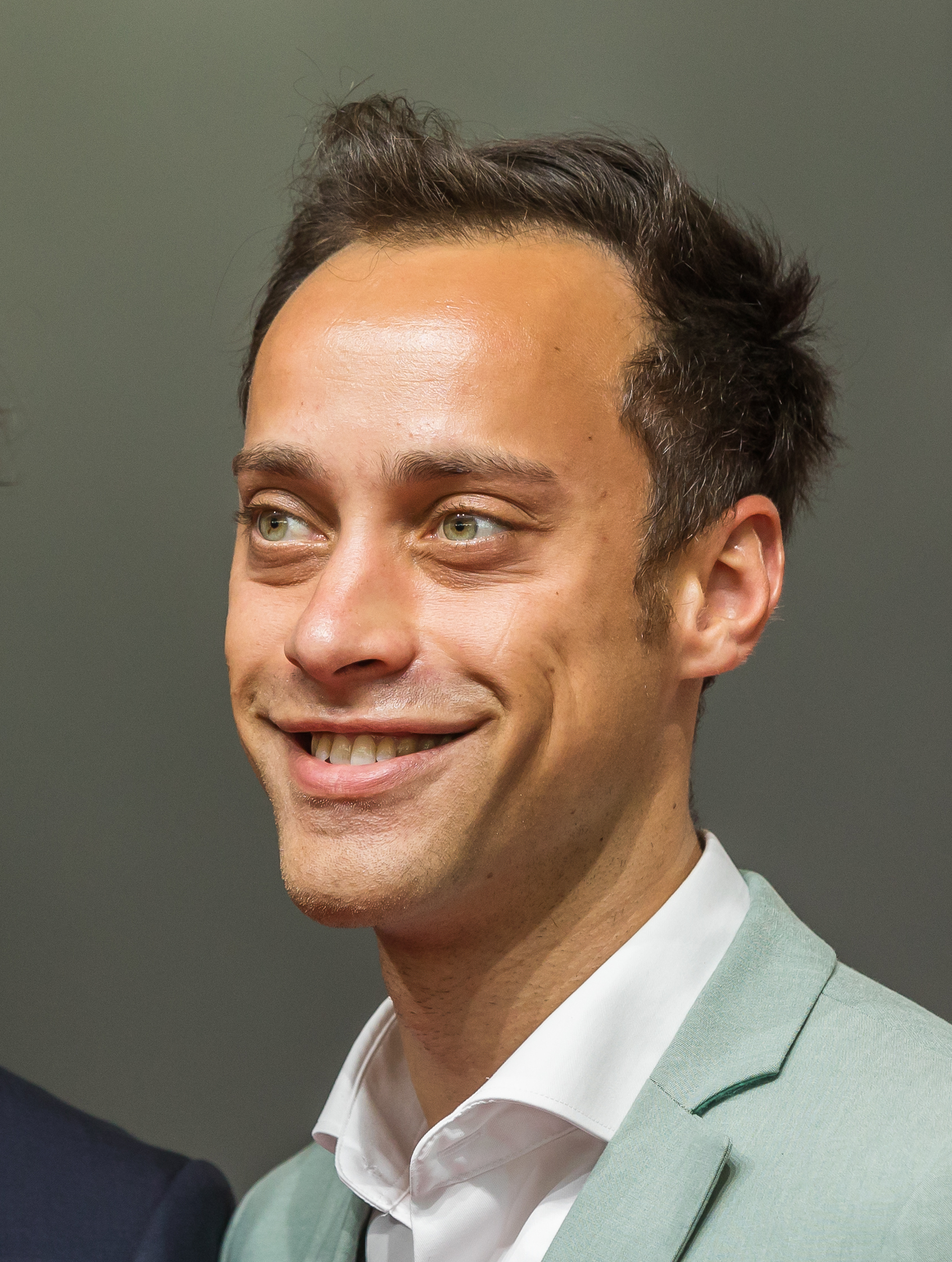
- Achtermeyer in 2022

Member of the Landtag of North Rhine-Westphalia
- Incumbent
- Assumed office 1 June 2022

Personal details
- Born: 13 September 1993 (age 32) Mönchengladbach
- Party: Alliance 90/The Greens (since 2011)

Tim Achtermeyer (born 13 September 1993 in Mönchengladbach) is a German politician serving as a member of the Landtag of North Rhine-Westphalia since 2022. He has served as co-chairman of Alliance 90/The Greens in North Rhine-Westphalia since 2022.
