= Michael Meert =

German film author and director (born 1953)

Michael Meert (born 1953 in Bonn, Germany) is a German film author and director. He is the grandson of the Flemish politician and writer Leo Meert and the bohemian violinist Stephanie Prinz.

== Life and work ==
From 1976 to 1981 Michael Meert studied at the German Film and Television Academy Berlin (dffb), where he met Andrei Tarkovsky, Joris Ivens and Johan van der Keuken. Later he attended the Masterclass of Edvard Bernstein−Zebrowski and Krzysztof Kieslowski for three years. Along with many others, he founded the “Video-Movement” and worked on a great number of videos within the “grass-roots movement” of video art. After his highly acclaimed feature film “Krieg der Töne” (ZDF, 1988) he worked along the border between documentary and video art and now he devotes his work mainly to TV movies with a highly poetic style for a broader public.

== Filmography (selection) ==
- 2012: Alle Menschen werden Brüder. Die Freimaurer und die Musik
- 2010: Die 12 langen Jahre
- 2009: Die hängenden Gärten von Cordoba
- 2008: Musikalische Reise - Beethoven in Bonn
- 2007: Vom schönen leben
- 2007: Der junge Beethoven
- 2007: Das Geheimnis des Dritten Tores
- 2005: Jordi Savall oder wie die Indianer sich in die Barockmusik einschlichen
- 2005: Eine Baltische Reise-Gidon Kremer
- 2004: Der Flamenco Clan/Herencia Flamenca
- 2003: Pablo Casals, ein Musiker verlangt eine bessere Welt
- 2000: Bad Boy of Music
- 1999: Violin Up!-Isaac Stern
- 1996: Iberia - Die Isaac Albéniz Story
- 1995: Paco de Lucía. Light and Shade
- 1993: Manuel de Falla und Federico García Lorca
- 1989: Der Tod des Maurice Ravel
- 1987: Krieg der Töne
- 1984: Nahtstellen
