= Timeline of Bonn =

Coordinates: 50.733992°N 7.099814°E

The following is a timeline of the history of the city of Bonn, North Rhine-Westphalia, Germany.

== Prior to 19th century ==
- 70 CE – Roman-Batavian conflict.
- 359 CE – Town of the Ubii restored by the emperor Julian.
- 889 CE – Settlement sacked by Norse raiders.
- 1151 – Doppelkirche Schwarzrheindorf consecrated.
- 13th C. – Bonn Minster (church) built.
- 1318 – Minoretenkirche (church) built.
- 1543 – Printing press in operation.
- 1597 – Bonn becomes capital of the Electorate of Cologne.
- 1627 – Kreuzbergkirche (Bonn) (church) built.
- 1673 – November: Siege of Bonn.
- 1693 – Jesuiten-kirche (church) built.
- 1730 – Palace built.
- 1737 – Town Hall built.
- 1746 – Poppelsdorf Palace built.
- 1770 – Ludwig van Beethoven born in Bonn.
- 1777 – Kurkölnische Akademie Bonn (academy) founded..
- 1792 – Beethoven leaves Bonn for Vienna where he would stay for the rest of his life.
- 1793 – N. Simrock music publisher in business.
- 1794 – French took power; sanctioned by the Treaty of Lunéville.
- 1800 – Johann Joseph Eichhoff becomes mayor.

== 19th century ==
- 1815 – Town becomes part of Prussia per Congress of Vienna.
- 1818 – Rhenish Frederic William University and Academic Art Museum established.
- 1820 – Museum of Antiquities founded.
- 1822 – Town becomes part of the Rhine Province.
- 1841 – Society of the Friends of Antiquity founded.
- 1844 – Railway Station built; Bonn–Cologne Railway begins operating.
- 1845 – Beethovenhalle (concert hall) built.
- 1851 – Leopold Kaufmann becomes mayor.
- 1859 – Durchmusterung astronomical survey begins at the Bonn Observatory.
- 1860 – Dieckhoff residence built.
- 1862 – Herz Jesu-kirche (church) built.
- 1867 – Population: 63,630.
- 1871 – Bonn-Beuel station opens.
- 1882 – Municipal museum active.
- 1884 – Railway Station rebuilt.
- 1885 – Population: 35,989.
- 1888 – the local newspaper General-Anzeiger was first published
- 1889 – Beethoven House museum opens.
- 1890 – Beethovenfest active.
- 1891 – Provincial Museum of Rhenish and Roman Antiquities opens.
- 1892 – Marienkirche (church) built.
- 1898 – Rhine bridge built.

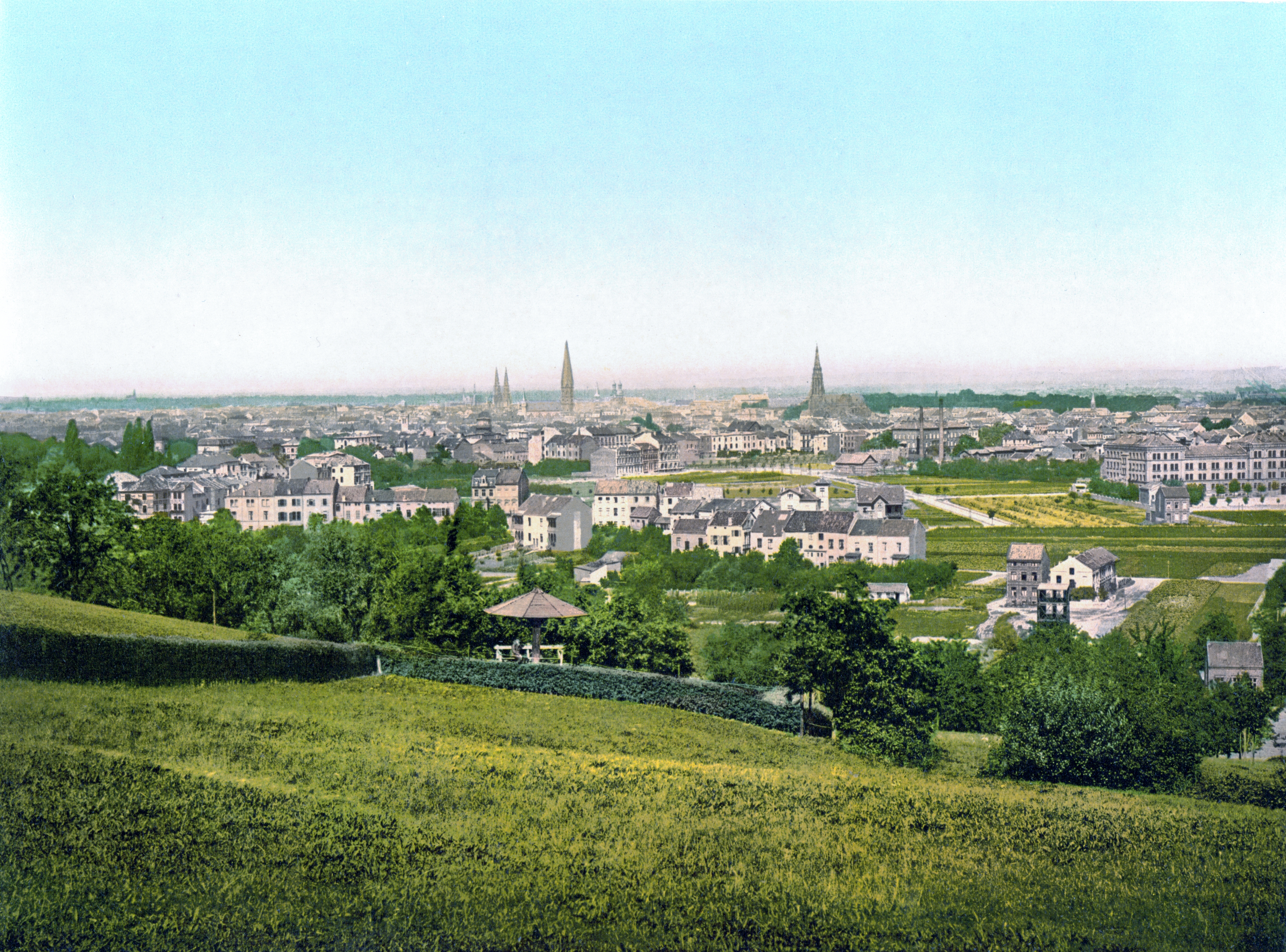
Bonn at the turn of the 19th and 20th centuries

== 20th century ==
=== 1900s-1940s ===
- 1904 – Photographische Vereinigung Bonn and Amateur-Photographen-Club Bonn active (approximate date).
- 1905 – Population: 81,997.
- 1913 – Stollfuß Verlag (publisher) in business.
- 1919 – Population: 91,410.
- 1922 – Gummy bear candy invented.
- 1934 – Museum Koenig (natural history museum) opens.
- 1939 – Population: 101,391.
- 1944
  - 4 May: Arbeitserziehungslager Bonn forced labour camp established.
  - 14 May: Arbeitserziehungslager Bonn-Bad Godesberg forced labour camp established.
  - 28 November: Arbeitserziehungslager Bonn forced labour camp dissolved.
- 1945
  - March: American forces take city.
  - Allied occupation of Germany begins; North Rhine-Westphalia overseen by British forces.
- 1947 – Kunstmuseum Bonn (art museum) founded.
- 1949
  - May: City designated capital of Federal Republic of Germany.
  - Bundestag (national legislature) begins meeting in the Bundeshaus.
  - Rhine bridge rebuilt.

=== 1950s-1990s ===
- 1950 – Cologne Bonn Airport in operation.
  - Hammerschmidt Villa designated residence of the President of Germany.
- 1951
  - Verein der Ausländischen Presse in Deutschland (foreign press association) formed.
- 1959 – Beethovenhalle rebuilt.
- 1963 – British Embassy Preparatory School founded.
- 1967 – Rheinisches Landesmuseum Bonn (museum) rebuilt.
- 1969
  - Bad Godesberg, Beuel, and Duisdorf become part of city.
  - Central Theater and Youth Theater founded.
- 1970 – United Nations Volunteers headquartered in Bonn.
- 1975
  - Bonn Stadtbahn (public transit) begins operating; Bundesrechnungshof station opens.
  - Hans Daniels becomes mayor.
- 1978 – July: 4th G7 summit held.
- 1979 – City hosts Bundesgartenschau (garden show).
- 1980 – University of Bonn's Max Planck Institute for Mathematics established.
- 1981 -Bonn Women's Museum founded.
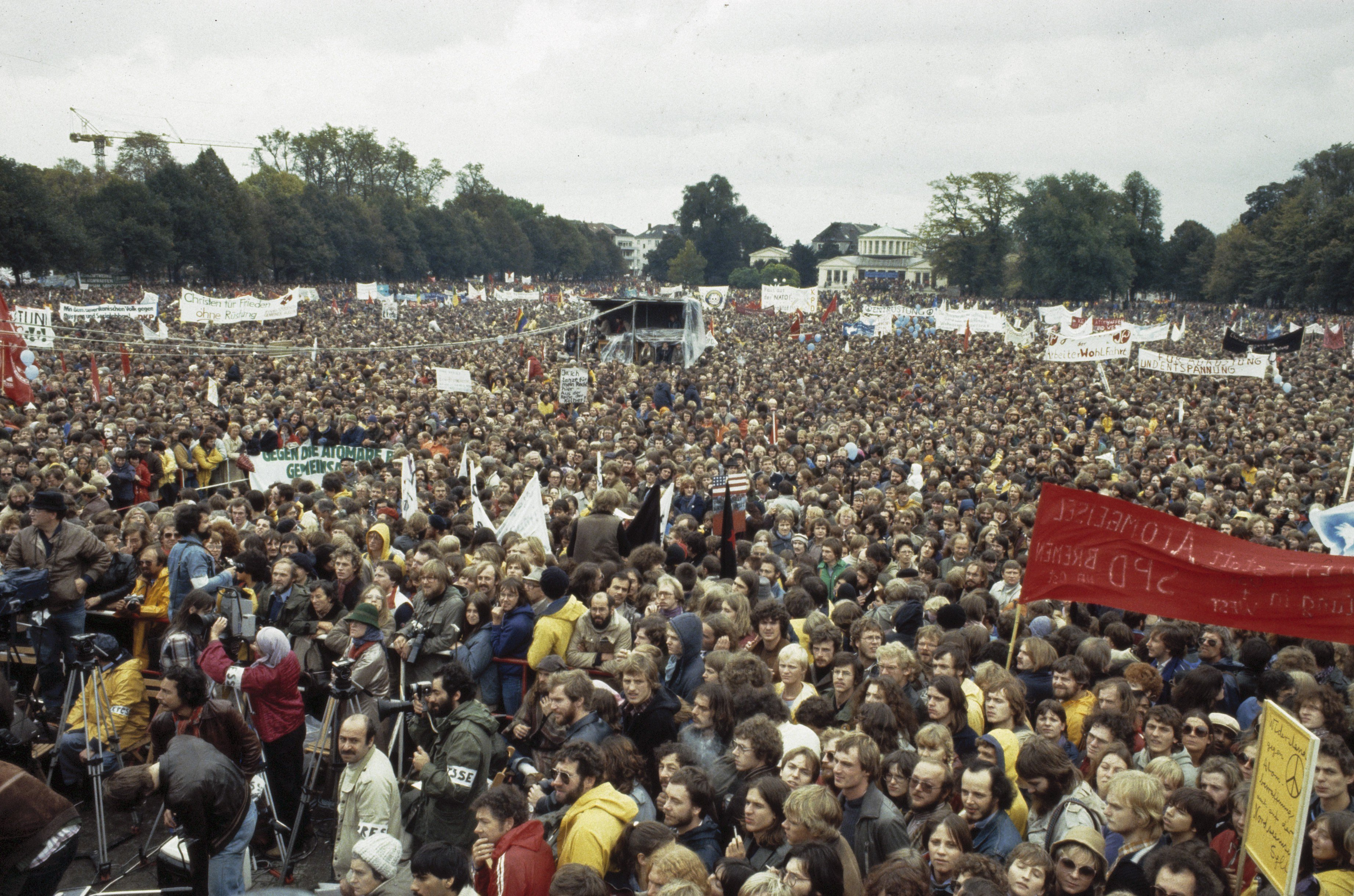
  Protest in Bonn against the deployment of Pershing II missiles in Germany, 1981
- 1982 – 10 June: NATO summit held.
- 1984 – Bonn Botanical Garden reconstructed.
- 1985
  - Rheinisches Malermuseum (art museum) established.
  - May: 11th G7 summit held.
- 1986 – Heimatmuseum Beuel (museum) established.
- 1989 – International Paralympic Committee headquartered in city.
- 1991 – Capital decision (Hauptstadtbeschluss)
- 1992 – Bundeskunsthalle (exhibit hall) inaugurated.
- 1994
  - Bärbel Dieckmann becomes mayor.
  - Haus der Geschichte (history museum) opens.
- 1995 – Deutsches Museum Bonn, and University of Bonn's Center of Advanced European Studies and Research and Center for European Integration Studies established.
- 1996 – United Nations Framework Convention on Climate Change secretariat headquartered in Bonn.
- 1997 – Bonn International School and Gesellschaft für Arabisches und Islamisches Recht (Society for Arab and Islamic Law) established.
- 1998 – Institute for the Study of Labor founded.
- 1999
  - German Bundestag (legislature) relocated from Bonn to Berlin per Berlin-Bonn Act.
  - Federal Court of Auditors and Federal Cartel Office relocated to Bonn.

== 21st century ==
- 2001 – University of Bonn's Egyptian Museum founded.
- 2002
  - Post Tower and Schürmann-Bau (office building) constructed.
  - UNESCO-UNEVOC International Centre for Technical and Vocational Education and Training inaugurated.
- 2005 – Events of the World Youth Day 2005 were held in Bonn
- 2006 – Official opening of the Bonn UN Campus by Secretary-General Kofi Annan and German Chancellor Angela Merkel
- 2009
  - Jürgen Nimptsch becomes mayor.
  - Student protests.

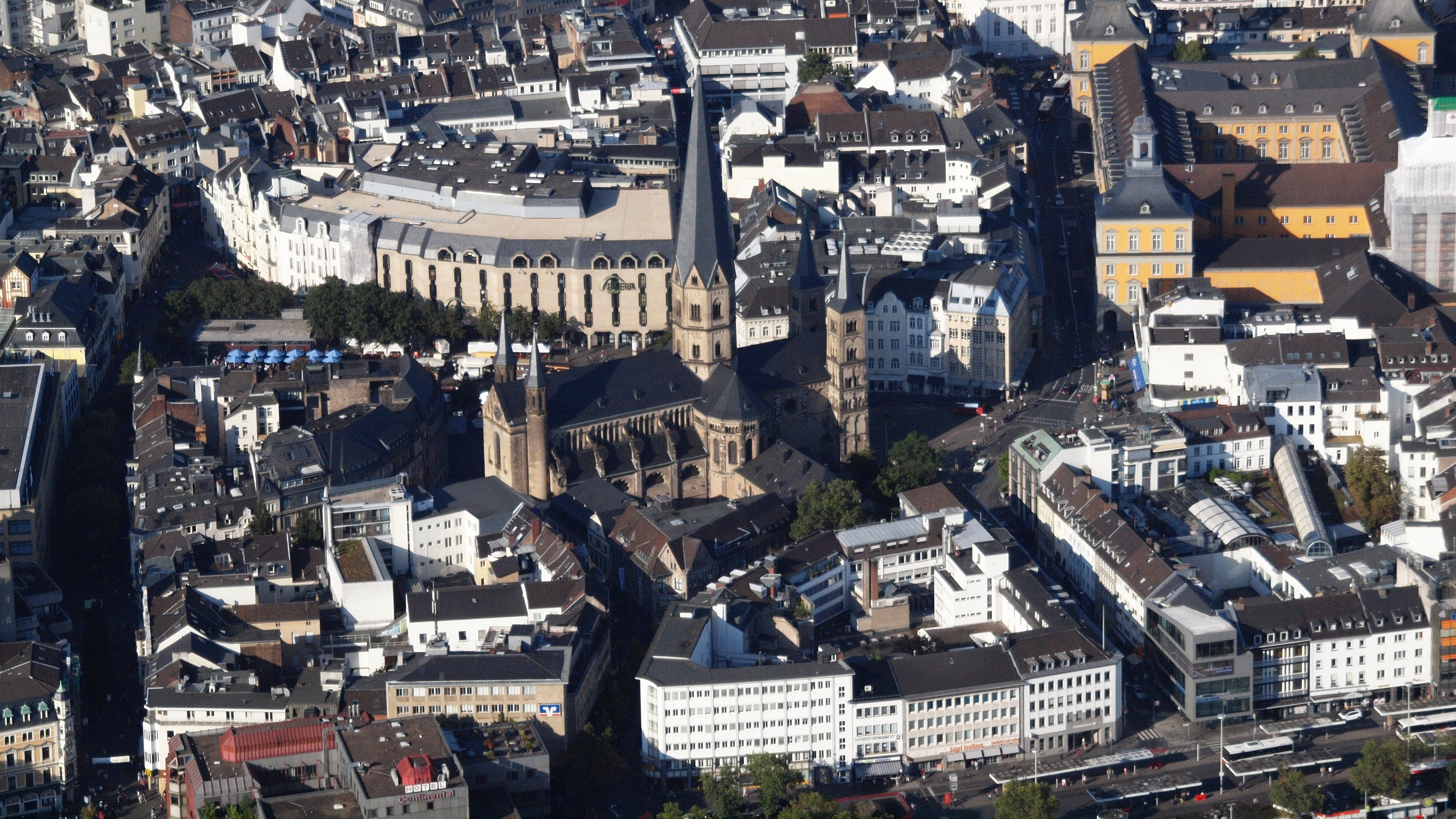
Aerial view of the city center in 2013

- 2011 – The celebrations for the Day of German Unity take place in Bonn
- 2012 – attempted bomb attack on Bonn Central Station
- 2015
  - After 9 years of construction, the World Conference Center Bonn was opened
  - Ashok-Alexander Sridharan becomes mayor
- 2017
  - Meeting of the ministers of Foreign Affairs of the Group of 20
  - 2017 United Nations Climate Change Conference (COP23) under the Presidency of the Republic of Fiji in Bonn
- 2019 – University of Bonn becomes excellence university
- 2020 – Katja Dörner is elected new mayor
- 2023 – Telekom Baskets Bonn win the Basketball Champions League as first German team and first title in the club´s history.
- 2025 – Guido Déus becomes mayor.

== See also ==
- Bonn history
- List of mayors of Bonn
- History of the city of Bonn
- Bonna (in Italian), settlement in the Roman province of Germania Inferior
- Timelines of other cities in the state of North Rhine-Westphalia:^{(de)} Aachen, Cologne, Dortmund, Duisburg, Düsseldorf, Essen, Münster

== Bibliography ==
=== in English ===
- T. Cogan (1794), "Bonn", The Rhine, London: J. Johnson, OCLC 4735435
- Francis Lieber and Edward Wigglesworth, ed. (1830). "Bonn". Encyclopædia Americana. Philadelphia: Carey and Lea.
- "Bonn", Murray's Handbook for Belgium and the Rhine, London: J. Murray, 1852
- "Bonn". Description of the Rhine Valley from Cologne to Mayence. Bonn: T. Habicht. 1856.
- Charles Knight, ed. (1866). "Bonn". Geography. English Cyclopaedia. Vol. 2. London: Bradbury, Evans, & Co. hdl:2027/nyp.33433000064794.
- W. Pembroke Fetridge (1884), "Bonn", Harper's Hand-Book for Travellers in Europe and the East (23rd ed.), New York: Harper & Brothers, hdl:2027/nyp.33433066588363
- G. Holscher (1900), "Bonn", Guide to the Rhine (3rd ed.), Cologne: Hoursch & Bechstedt, OCLC 8672751
- "Bonn" . Encyclopædia Britannica. Vol. 4 (11th ed.). 1910. p. 209.
- "Bonn", The Rhine, Leipzig: Karl Baedeker, 1911, OCLC 21888483
- John M. Jeep, ed. (2001). "Augsburg". Medieval Germany: an Encyclopedia. Garland Publishing. ISBN 0-8240-7644-3.

=== in German ===
- B. Hundeshagen (1832), Die Stadt und Universität Bonn am Rhein [City and University of Bonn on the Rhine] (in German), Bonn: Tobias Habicht, OCLC 165879286, OL 23434076M
- Caspar A. Müller (1834), Geschichte der Stadt Bonn [History of the City of Bonn] (in German), Bonn
- Franz Ritter (1851). Entstehung der drei ältesten Städte am Rheine oder Urgeschichte von Mainz, Bonn u. Köln [Emergence of the three oldest cities on the Rhine, or prehistory of Mainz, Bonn and Cologne] (in German). A. Marcus.
- "Bonn". Kleiner Führer für die Rhein-Reise von Köln bis Frankfurt [Short guide for a trip along the Rhine from Cologne to Frankfurt]. Griebens Reisebücher (in German). Vol. 75. Berlin: Albert Goldschmidt. 1900 – via Google Books.
- Paul Clemen, ed. (1905). Kunstdenkmäler der Stadt und des Kreises Bonn. Die Kunstdenkmäler der Rheinprovinz (in German). Vol. 5. Dusseldorf: Schwann.
- Klaus Flink, ed. (1978), Bonn, Rheinischer Städteatlas (in German), vol. 1 (2nd ed.)
