= Aphroditus =

Masculine form of Aphrodite

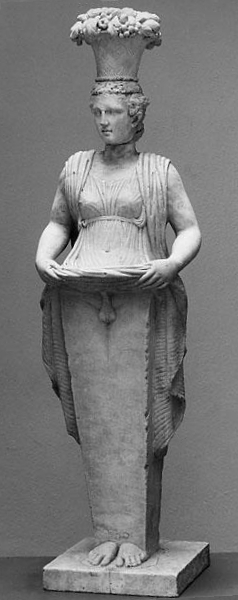
Herm of Aphroditus at the Nationalmuseum in Stockholm

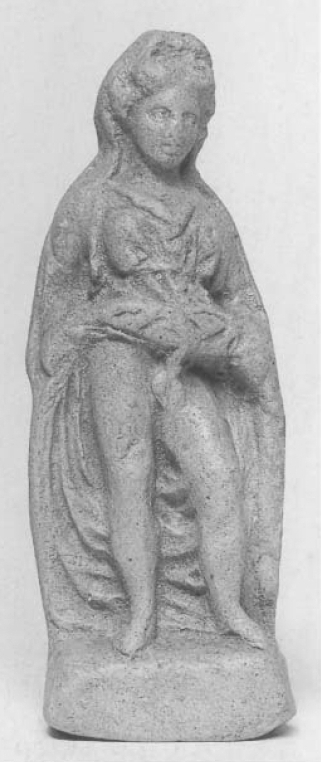
Greek terracotta figurine, late 4th century BCE, National Museum of Magna Grecia

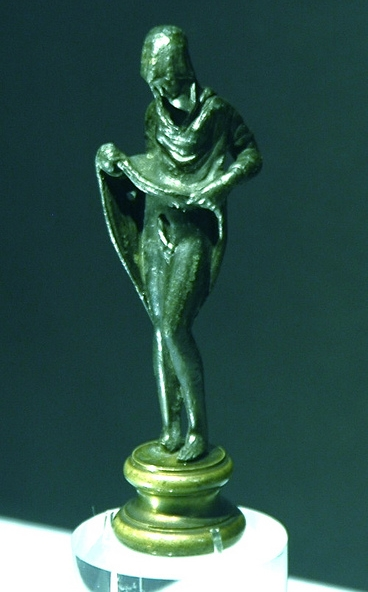
Bronze statuette, Roman imperial, 1st-3rd century CE, British Museum

Aphroditus or Aphroditos (Ancient Greek: Ἀφρόδιτος, Aphróditos, [apʰróditos]) was a version of the goddess Aphrodite originating from Amathus on the island of Cyprus and celebrated in Athens. He is the masculine version of Aphrodite.

Aphroditus was portrayed as having a female shape and clothing like Aphrodite's but also a phallus, and hence, a male name. This deity would have arrived in Athens from Cyprus in the 4th century BC. In the 5th century BC, however, there existed hermae of Aphroditus, or phallic statues with a female head.

Aphroditus is the same as the later god Hermaphroditus, whose name derives from those of his parents, Aphrodite and Hermes. Hermaphroditos first appeared in the Characters of Theophrastus. Photius also explained that Aphroditus was Hermaphroditos, and cited fragments from Attic comedies mentioning the divinity.

One of the earliest surviving images from Athens is a fragment (late 4th century BC), found in the Athenian agora, of a clay mould for a terracotta figurine. The figurine would have stood about 30 cm high, represented in a style known as ἀνασυρόμενος (anasyromenos), a female lifting her dress to reveal male genitals, a gesture that was believed to have apotropaic qualities, averting evil influences and bestowing good luck.

This combination of the male and female in one divinity and being associated with the moon, both of which were considered to have fertilizing powers, was regarded as having an influence over the entire animal and vegetable creation.

== Etymology ==
Aphroditus (Ἀφρόδιτος) seems to be the male version of Aphrodite (Ἀφροδίτη), with the female thematic ending -ē (-η) exchanged for the male thematic ending -os (-ος), as paralleled e.g. in Cleopatra/Cleopatros or Andromache/Andromachus.

== Worship ==
According to Macrobius, who mentions the goddess in his Saturnalia, Philochorus, in his Atthis (referred to by Macrobius), identifies this god with the Moon and says that at their sacrifices men and women exchanged clothing. Philostratus, in describing the rituals involved in the festivals, said that the image or the impersonator of the god was accompanied by a large train of followers in which girls mingled with men because the festivals allowed "women to act the part of men, and men put on woman's clothing and play the woman".

== Literature ==
Theophrastus (c. 371 – c. 287 BC), Characters 16.10

"On the fourth and seventh days of each month, he directs mulled wine to be prepared, and going himself to purchase myrtle-wreaths, frankincense and convolvuluses; he returns to spend the day worshiping the statue of Hermaphroditus."

Philochorus (c. 337–283 BC), Atthis

Pausanias (c. 110 – c. 180 AD), Description of Greece 1.19.2

Concerning the district called The Gardens, and the temple of Aphrodite, there is no story that is told by them, nor yet about the Aphrodite which stands near the temple. Now the shape of it is square, like that of the Hermae, and the inscription declares that the Heavenly Aphrodite is the oldest of those called Fates. But the statue of Aphrodite in the Gardens is the work of Alcamenes, and one of the most noteworthy things in Athens.

Alciphron (c. 125 – after 180 AD), Epistles 3.37

Having woven a garland of flowers, I repaired to the temple of Hermaphroditus, to fix it there, in honour of my deceased husband Phaedria [sic] but I was seized there by Moschion and his companions. He had been teasing me to marry him; but I refused, partly through compassion for my young children; and also because my dear Phaedria [sic] is ever in my thoughts.

Philostratus (c. 190 – c. 230 AD), Imagines 1.2

The torches give a faint light, enough for the revellers to see what is close in front of them, but not enough for us to see them. Peals of laughter rise, and women rush along with men, wearing men's sandals and garments girt in strange fashion; for the revel permits women to masquerade as men, and men to "put on women's garb" and to ape the walk of women.

Macrobius (c. 400s AD), Saturnalia 3.8.2

There's also a statue of Venus on Cyprus, that's bearded, shaped and dressed like a woman, with scepter and male genitals, and they conceive her as both male and female. Aristophanes calls her Aphroditus, and Laevius says: Worshiping, then, the nurturing god Venus, whether she is male or female, just as the Moon is a nurturing goddess. In his Atthis Philochorus, too, states that she is the Moon and that men sacrifice to her in women's dress, women in men's, because she is held to be both male and female.

== See also ==
- Agdistis
- Ancient history of Cyprus
- Aphrodite of the Gardens
- Paeon of Amathus
