= Argüelles (surname) =

Argüelles is a Spanish surname. As with other such surnames, it is often written without diacritics as Arguelles.

- Agustín Argüelles (1776–1844), Spanish liberal politician and lawyer
- Alexander Argüelles (born 1964), American linguist
- Angélica Argüelles Kubli (born 1963), Mexican graphic designer
- Arael Argüelles (born 1987), Cuban footballer
- Bartolomé de Argüelles (16th century), lieutenant treasurer and co-interim governor of La Florida
- Carlos Arguelles (1917–2008), Filipino architect
- Consuelo Argüelles Loya (born 1977), Mexican National Action Party politician
- Emil Arguelles (born 1972), Belizean lawyer and politician, Speaker of the House of Representatives
- Faustino Rodríguez-San Pedro y Díaz-Argüelles (1833–1925), Spanish politician, Mayor of Madrid
- Fulgencio Argüelles (born 1955), Spanish writer and psychologist
- Ivan Argüelles (born 1939), American poet
- Jacqueline Argüelles (born 1968), Mexican Green Party politician
- John Arguelles (20th century), American lawyer, Associate Justice of the Supreme Court of California
- José Argüelles (1939–2011), American New Age author and artist
- José Canga Argüelles (1770–1843), Spanish politician, Minister of Finance
- Juan Antonio Arguelles Rius (1978–2007), also known as Arguru or Argu, Spanish music software programmer and musician
- Juan de Argüelles (1659–1712), Peruvian priest, Bishop of Arequipa, and Bishop of Panama
- Julian Argüelles (born 1966), English jazz saxophonist
- Manuel Argüelles Argüelles (1875–1945), Spanish politician and lawyer, Minister of Finance, Minister of Public Works
- María Argüelles Arellano (born 1963), Mexican National Action Party politician
- Martín de Argüelles (born 1566), first white person to have been born in what is now the United States
- Marco Argüelles (born 1989), Mexican footballer
- Noel Argüelles (born 1990), Cuban baseball pitcher
- Pedro Argüelles Morán (born 1943), pseudonym Pedro del Sol, Cuban cartographer, journalist, and human rights activist
- Ramon Arguelles (born 1944), Filipino priest, Archbishop of the Metropolitan Diocese of Lipa
- Steve Argüelles (born 1963), English jazz drummer
- Yarianny Arguelles (born 1984), Cuban track-and-field athlete specializing in long jump

== See also ==
- Argüello (surname)
