= Katatomē =

katatomē (κατατομή) is a Greek word meaning 'incision.'

== Classical Greek ==
1. The original meaning, following etymology, in classical texts means 'incision,' 'notch,' or 'groove,' (Theophrastus The Hippocratic treatises 4.8.10, and Symmachus Sm.Je.31 (48).37), whereas aneu katatomes (ἄνευ κατατομῆς) means 'uncarved,' 'smooth,' (Inscriptiones Graecae IG12.372.134, cf. 373.231). The plural, 'notches,' is found in Artemidorus (1.67) and 'written in the incision of the rock' (ἐπέγραψεν ἐπὶ τὴν κατατομήν τῆς πέτρας), Philochorus Historicus, 4th century BCE (138).

2. By extension it also came to mean an architectural 'incision', 'nook' in a theatre, in Hyperides, perhaps the same as the orchestra (ὀρχήστρα) or diazoma (διάζωμα), (Anecdota Graeca AB270., cf. Photius Lexicographus, 9th century AD). Demosthenes placed himself beneath the katatome which suggests he may have been barred from speaking to any citizen from another phyle.

Hyperides, Against Demosthenes speech 5, fragment 3

— "His real purpose, it seems, was not simply to learn the figure, but to find out from how large a sum he was to collect his commission. Sitting below in his usual place in the niche,5 he told Mnesitheus the dancer to ask Harpalus how much money there would be to take up to the Acropolis."

3. A later meaning is katagraphe καταγραφή, 'profile,' according to Hesychius Lexicographus, 5th century AD.

== New Testament ==
It is the Greek word translated 'beware of the concision,' in Philippians 3:2, KJV. The term 'mutilation' is contrasted with "we are the circumcision (περιτομή peritomē), which worship God in the spirit, and rejoice in Christ Jesus, and have no confidence in the flesh." The context is the circumcision controversy in early Christianity.
