= Argüelles =

Argüelles or Arguelles may refer to the following.

- Argüelles (Madrid), a ward in Madrid, Spain
  - Argüelles (Madrid Metro), a station on Line 3, 4 and 6
- Pabellón Polideportivo Municipal Fernando Argüelles, an arena in Antequera, Spain
- Argüelles (surname), a Spanish surname

== See also ==
- Argüello (surname)
