= Fulgence =

Fulgence is a Francophone given name derived from the Latin name Fulgentius (meaning "bright, brilliant"), which was borne by several saints.

Some modern bearers of that name:

- Fulgence Bienvenüe (1852–1936), French civil engineer, famous for his participation in the creation of the Paris Metro
- Fulgence Charpentier (1897–2001), French-Canadian journalist, editor and publisher
- Fulgence Ouedraogo (born 1982), French rugby union footballer
- Fulgence Rabemahafaly (born 1951), Archbishop of Fianarantsoa, Madagascar
- Fulgence Raymond (1844-1910), French neurologist
- Fulgence Razakarivony (born 1963), Malagasy clergyman and prelate

== See also ==
- Fulgencio
- Wiktionary:fulgent
