= Ernst Langlotz =

Ernst Langlotz (6 July 1895, in Ronneburg – 4 June 1978, in Bonn) was a German classical archaeologist and art historian, who specialized in Greek sculpture of the 6th and 5th centuries BCE.

He studied classical archaeology, philology and art history at Leipzig University and the Ludwig-Maximilians-Universität München, receiving his doctorate in 1921. As a student, his influences were archaeologist Franz Studniczka (Leipzig) and art historian Heinrich Wölfflin (Munich). Following graduation, he took a study trip to Italy and Greece, where he met with Ernst Buschor in Athens. In 1925, he qualified as a lecturer at the University of Würzburg, and subsequently worked as a conservator at the Martin von Wagner Museum.

In 1931, he became an associate professor at the University of Jena, and two years later, attained a full professorship at the University of Frankfurt am Main. From 1941 to 1963, he was a professor at the University of Bonn, where he also served as director of the Akademisches Kunstmuseum.

== Selected works ==
- Zur Zeitbestimmung der Strengrotfigurigen Vasenmalerei und der gleichzeitigen Plastik, 1920.
- Griechische Vasenbilder, 1922 – Greek vase figures.
- Die archaischen Marmorbildwerke der Akropolis (with Hans Schrader and Walter-Herwig Schuchhardt, 1939) – Archaic marble works of the Acropolis.
- Archaische Plastik auf der Akropolis, 1941 – Archaic sculpture of the Acropolis.
- Griechische Klassik, 1946 – Classical Greek.
- Phidiasprobleme, 1947 – Phidias problems.
- Die Darstellung des Menschen in der griechischen Kunst, 1948 – The representation of man in Greek art.
- Alkamenes-Probleme, 1952 – Alcamenes problems.
- Antike Klassik in heutiger Sicht, 1956 – The classics from a modern perspective.
- Die Kunst der Westgriechen in Sizilien und Unteritalien, 1963 – Art of western Greece in Sicily and southern Italy.
- Ancient Greek sculpture of South Italy and Sicily (Photos by Max Hirmer, translated by Audrey Hicks; 1965).
- The art of Magna Graecia : Greek art in southern Italy and Sicily (Photos by Max Hirmer, translated by Audrey Hicks; 1965).
- Studien zur nordostgriechischen Kunst, 1975 – Studies of northeastern Greek art.
