= Atlantiades =

Atlantiades or Atlantiadis (Greek: Ατλαντιάδης) may refer to:

- Hermes, Olympian god. His mother Maia was the daughter of Atlas, whence he is also called Atlantiades.
- Hermaphroditus, the son of Aphrodite and Hermes. Because he was a son of Hermes, and consequently a great-grandson of Atlas, he is also called Atlantiades.
