= Wolfgang Kosack =

German Egyptologist, translator and Coptologist (born 1943)

- Born: 29 October 1943 (age 82); Berlin, Germany
- Education: University of Bonn (Ph.D., 1970)
- Occupations: Egyptologist; Coptologist; translator; scientific librarian
- Employers: Berlin State Library (scientific librarian); Editor at *Armant*
- Known for: Scholarly translations and editions of Coptic and Ancient Egyptian texts; extensive publications on Egyptological topics
- Notable work: Die Legende im Koptischen. Untersuchungen zur Volksliteratur Ägyptens (1970); Lehrbuch des Koptischen (1974); German translation of the Pyramidentexte (2012); Expansion of Erman & Grapow's Wörterbuch der ägyptischen Sprache (2019)

Wolfgang Kosack /'vɔlfgaŋ 'ko:zak/ (Berlin, October 29, 1943) is a German Egyptologist, translator and Coptologist.

Wolfgang is the son of German geographer and cartographer Hans-Peter Kosack. In 1970 he completed a PhD from the university of Boon with a thesis titled Die Legende im Koptischen. Untersuchungen zur Volksliteratur Ägyptens ("Legends in copt. A study on the popular literature of egypt"). Kosack then went on to do an internship in the field scientific librarianship, which he completed in 1973.

He worked alongside Moustafa Maher as an editor for Arabic-German magazine Armant directed by Helmut Birkenfeld.

In 2013 he published two translations with commentaries around the writings of Shenoute of Atripe, the abbot of the white monastery in Egypt.

In 2014 he donated several manuscripts and prints (in Arabic, Turkish, Persian, Urdu and Lhasa Tibetan) to the Berlin state library. He also donated his collection of artifacts and documents in Egyptian to the Bonn Egyptian museum. The collections can be freely accessed by the public and for further scientific study and have been featured in the exhibition Nicht nur Nofretete? ("Not only Nefertiti?") which took place from 18 March to 14 June 2015.

Kosack was also the author of literature works such as Japanische Manga - Love Story ("Japanese Manga - Love Story") as well as a scientific publication in regards to the sexual orientation of Frederick the Great titles Die Mänlichen Krefte der Liebe ("the manly forces of love").

== Publications ==
- Die Legende im Koptischen. Untersuchungen zur Volksliteratur Ägyptens, Habelt, Bonn, 1970.
- Historisches Kartenwerk Ägyptens, Habelt, Bonn, 1971, ISBN 978-3-7749-1126-0.
- Alltag im alten Ägypten. Aus der Ägyptensammlung des Museums, Städtische Museen, Friburgo in Brisgovia, 1974.
- Lehrbuch des Koptischen, Teil I: Koptische Grammatik, Teil II: Koptische Lesestücke, Akademische Druck- und Verlagsanstalt, Graz, 1974, ISBN 978-3-201-00889-1.
- Antike Kultur auf Münzen von Qarara, Städtische Museen, Friburgo in Brisgovia, 1977.
- Der medizinische Papyrus Edwin Smith. The New York Academy of Medicine, Inv. 217; Neu in Hieroglyphen übertragen, übersetzt und bearbeitet, Berlino, 2011; Christoph Brunner, Basilea, 2012, ISBN 978-3-033-03331-3. Deutsche Nationalbibliothek http://d-nb.info/1026714648
- Der koptische Heiligenkalender. Deutsch - Koptisch - Arabisch nach den besten Quellen neu bearbeitet und vollständig herausgegeben mit Index Sanctorum koptischer Heiliger, Index der Namen auf Koptisch, Koptische Patriarchenliste, Geografische Liste, Christoph Brunner, Berlino, 2012, 4ª ed., ISBN 978-3-9524018-4-2. Deutsche Nationalbibliothek http://d-nb.info/1026714664/about/html
- Die altägyptischen Pyramidentexte. In neuer deutscher Übersetzung; vollständig bearbeitet und herausgegeben von Wolfgang Kosack, Christoph Brunner, Berlino, 2012, ISBN 978-3-9524018-1-1.
- Ägyptische Zeichenliste I. Grundlagen der Hieroglyphenschrift. Definition, Gestaltung und Gebrauch ägyptischer Schriftzeichen. Vorarbeiten zu einer Schriftliste, Berlino, 2013, Christoph Brunner, Basilea, 2013, ISBN 978-3-9524018-0-4
- Ägyptische Zeichenliste II. 8500 Hieroglyphen aller Epochen. Lesungen, Deutungen, Verwendungen gesammelt und bearbeitet, Berlino, 2013, Christoph Brunner, ISBN 978-3-9524018-2-8
- Schenute von Atripe De judicio finale. Papyruskodex 63000.IV im Museo Egizio di Torino. Einleitung, Textbearbeitung und Übersetzung herausgegeben von Wolfgang Kosack, Christoph Brunner, Berlino, 2013, ISBN 978-3-9524018-5-9
- So viel zum Thema Moses...: Neue Fragen zum Alten Testament. Die Schlechte und die Gute Nachricht. Für Juden, Christen, Moslems, Books on Demand, Norderstedt, 2013, ISBN 978-3-9524018-6-6
- So viel zum Thema Islam: Neues von der Botschaft Muhammads, über das "Buch, was man lesen muss", für Juden, Christen, Moslems, Books on Demand, Norderstedt, 2013, ISBN 978-3-7322-3240-6
- Die altägyptischen Personennamen. Ein Beitrag zur Kulturgeschichte Ägyptens, Christoph Brunner, Berlino, 2013, ISBN 978-3-9524018-7-3
- Kurze Sprachlehre des Mittelägyptischen, Christoph Brunner, Basilea, 2013, ISBN 978-3-9524018-8-0.
- Koptisches Handlexikon des Bohairischen. Koptisch - Deutsch - Arabisch, Christoph Brunner, Basilea, 2013, ISBN 978-3-9524018-9-7.
- Shenoute of Atripe "De vita christiana": M 604 Pierpont-Morgan-Library New York/Ms. OR 12689 British-Library/London and Ms. Clarendon Press b. 4, Frg. Bodleian-Library/Oxford. Introduction, edition of the text and translation into German by Wolfgang Kosack, Christoph Brunner, Basilea, 2013, ISBN 978-3-906206-00-4
- Essen und Trinken im alten Ägypten: Bildliche Darstellungen, hieroglyphische Texte und die Bearbeitung der Quellen, Christoph Brunner, Berlino, 2014, ISBN 978-3-906206-03-5
- Basilios "De archangelo Michael": sahidice Pseudo - Euhodios "De resurrectione": sahidice Pseudo - Euhodios "De dormitione Mariae virginis": sahidice & bohairice: < Papyruskodex Turin, Mus. Egizio Cat. 63000 XI. > nebst Varianten und Fragmente. In Parallelzeilen ediert, kommentiert und übersetzt von Wolfgang Kosack, Christoph Brunner, Berlino, 2014, ISBN 978-3-906206-02-8.
- Novum Testamentum Coptice: Neues Testament, Bohairisch, ediert von Wolfgang Kosack. Novum Testamentum, Bohairice, curavit Wolfgang Kosack. Koptisch - Deutsch, Christoph Brunner, Basilea, 2014, ISBN 978-3-906206-04-2.
- Ost-Märchen. Gedanken und Erinnerungen an eine längst vergangene Zeit. Berlin, zum 60. Jahrestag der Republik -(für Westler) 7. Oktober 2010, Christoph Brunner, Basilea, 2014, ISBN 978-3-906206-05-9.
- Geschichte der Gnosis in Antike, Urchristentum und Islam. Texte, Bilder, Dokumente, Christoph Brunner, Basilea, 2014, ISBN 978-3-906206-06-6
- Collectanea Aegyptiaca. Aufsätze und Studien zur Kulturgeschichte des Alten Aegyptens, Christoph Brunner, Basilea, 2014, ISBN 978-3-906206-08-0.
- Hallo, ihr Lebenden auf der Erde! Teil I. + II. Lebensberichte aus der Pharaonenzeit auf Gräbern und Denksteinen. Gesammelt, übersetzt und kommentiert, Christoph Brunner, Basilea, 2014, ISBN 978-3-906206-09-7.
- Islamische Schriftkunst des Kufischen. Geometrisches Kufi in 593 Schriftbeispielen. Deutsch - Kufi - Arabisch, Christoph Brunner, Basilea, 2014, ISBN 978-3-906206-10-3.
- Die koptischen Akten der Konzile von Nikaia und Ephesos. Textfragmente und Handschriften in Paris, Turin, Neapel, Wien und Kairo. In Parallelzeilen herausgegeben, bearbeitet und übersetzt. Koptisch - Deutsch, Christoph Brunner, Basilea, 2015, ISBN 978-3-906206-07-3.
- Berliner Hefte zur ägyptischen Literatur 1 - 12: Teil I. 1 - 6/Teil II. 7 - 12 (2 Bände). Paralleltexte in Hieroglyphen mit Einführungen und Übersetzung. Deutsch - Hieroglyphen, Wolfgang Kosack, ISBN 978-3-906206-11-0.
- Geschichte der Gnosis II.: Jesus und das neue Testament. Eine Botschaft Christi. Für Juden, Christen, Moslems, Christoph Brunner, Basilea, ISBN 978-3-906206-12-7.
- Collectanea Coptica. Die titellose gnostische Schrift Traktat vom Urvater Sêtheus aus dem Codex Brucianus. Nag Hamadi Codex VI, 48-51, 23 Platons Politeia in einer koptischen Übersetzung Schenute oder nicht? (Pierpont-Morgan-Library/New York + Univ. Michigan) Die koptischen Psalmenkonkordanzen. Lesen und Schreiben im Ägypten der Spätantike, Christoph Brunner, Basilea, 2015, ISBN 978-3-906206-13-4.
- Hiera Grammata. Beiträge zur Entstehung ägyptischer Hieroglyphen, Christoph Brunner, Basilea, 2015, ISBN 978-3-906206-15-8.
- Ägyptologie im Umbruch. Eine Streitschrift, Christoph Brunner, Basilea, 2015, ISBN 978-3-906206-16-5
- Kurze Geschichte der Kopten, Christoph Brunner, Basilea, 2015, ISBN 978-3-906206-17-2.
- Ein zweiter Rembrandt: "Die Staalmeesters" - Kunsthistorische Studie, Christoph Brunner, Basilea, 2015, ISBN 978-3-906206-14-1.
- Ernst Koerner - Ein Berliner Orientmaler des 19. Jahrhunderts, Christoph Brunner, Basilea, 2015, ISBN 978-3-906206-19-6.
- Laotse Von der Kraft und Vom Sinn. Buch der Sinnsprüche in 81 Abschnitten und 2 Teilen. Übertragen aus den Seidentexten zu Ma Wang Dui (Provinz Honan), Christoph Brunner, Basilea, 2014. ISBN 978-3-906206-18-9.
- Koptische Lehrbriefe Bohairisch Deutsch - Koptisch - Arabisch - Bohairisch, Christoph Brunner, Basilea, 2016, ISBN 978-3-906206-20-2.
- Nu mute gi liden den bitteren doet... - Der Berliner Totentanz. Kritischer Text, Übersetzung und Kommentar des niederdeutschen Gedichts, Christoph Brunner, Basilea, ISBN 978-3-906206-22-6.
- Fellachenmärchen. Märchen im ägyptisch-arabischen Volksdialekt, Christoph Brunner, Basilea, 2016, ISBN 978-3-906206-26-4.
- Schachmatt. Kaskade der Seltsamkeiten. Historische Groteske in 11 Bildern, Christoph Brunner, Basilea, 2016, ISBN 978-3-906206-26-4.
- Japanische Manga - Love Story: "Yura, Makoto und die Liebe." von Katsu Aki. Eine kritische Würdigung, Carlsenmanga, Amburgo, 2004–2013; Christoph Brunner, Basilea, 2016, ISBN 978-3-906206-27-0.
- Die Mänlichen Krefte der Liebe. Zur Frage der Sexualität Friedrichs des Großen. Studien und Quellen, Christoph Brunner, Basilea, 2016, ISBN 978-3-906206-23-3.
- Die Wurzel Jesse zu Xanten: Die Predella des Marienaltars, ein spätes Meisterwerk Heinrich Douvermanns. Beschrieben, erklärt und erläutert, Christoph Brunner, Basilea, 2016, ISBN 978-3-906206-29-5.
- Die Geschichte von der Sonnenkatze und dem kleinen Affen: Ein altägyptisches Märchen für Kinder, Christoph Brunner, 2016, ISBN 978-3-906206-31-8.
- Lexikon des Gräcoägyptischen. Transkriptionen, Hieroglyphen und koptische Belege mit einer Einführung in die Aussprache des Altägyptischen, 3 voll., Christoph Brunner, Basilea, 2016, ISBN 978-3-906206-24-0.
- Zeremonialtexte der Dritten Dynastie - Pap. Ramesseum B + E und der Schabakostein. Neu herausgegeben, bearbeitet und übersetzt, Christoph Brunner, Basilea, 2016, ISBN 978-3-906206-34-9.
- Frühe Kunst im Orient. Ein Ausweg aus der Misere des Islam - IS und Euroislam in der Krise, Christoph Brunner, Basilea, 2016, ISBN 978-3-906206-36-3.
- Persische Sinnsprüche. Vierzeiler von Omar Chajjam, Christoph Brunner, Basilea, 2016, ISBN 978-3-906206-37-0.
- Schrift der Pharaonen. Hieroglyphen für Anfänger. Mit zahlreichen Schriftproben, 140 Abbildungn und 500 Hieroglyphen, Christoph Brunner, Basilea, 2017, ISBN 978-3-906206-38-7.
- Sadi. Buch der Weisheit (Pand Nameh), Christoph Brunner, Basilea, 2017, ISBN 978-3-906206-39-4.
- ''Wo die Wüste sich dehnt und die Nilflut rollt...'' Biblisches und muslimisches Ägypten im Spiegel deutscher Dichtung, Christoph Brunner, Basilea, 2017, ISBN 978-3-906206-41-7.
- Pheidias? Die Archäologie des klassischen Aegyptens auf dem Prüfstand, Christoph Brunner, Nunningen, 2017, ISBN 978-3-906206-43-1
- Wozu sind die Ägyptologen gut? Ägyptologie im Abend- und im Morgenland, Christoph Brunner, Nunningen, 2017, ISBN 978-3-906206-44-8
- Unter Palmen und Tempelruinen. Das alte Ägypten im Spiegel der Deutschen Dichtung, Christoph Brunner, Nunningen, 2017, ISBN 978-3-906206-45-5
- Adolf Erman, Hermann Grapow (edito da), Wörterbuch der ägyptischen Sprache, ampliato, corretto e integrato da Wolfgang Kosack, 5 voll., Christoph Brunner, Nunningen, 2018, ISBN 978-3-906206-40-0.
- Geschichten aus einem Verlag - Beiläufige Chronik des „Verlags Christoph Brunner", Christoph Brunner, Nunningen, 2018, ISBN 978-3-906206-49-3.
- Kurze Geschichte des Altägyptischen - Basisgrammatik für Fortgeschrittene, Christoph Brunner, Nunningen, 2018, ISBN 978-3-906206-50-9.
- Der versteinerte Islam - IS, Islamisten und wir, Christoph Brunner, Nunningen, 2019, ISBN 978-3-906206-51-6.
