= Aphrodite of the Gardens =

Ancient Greek mythological epithet

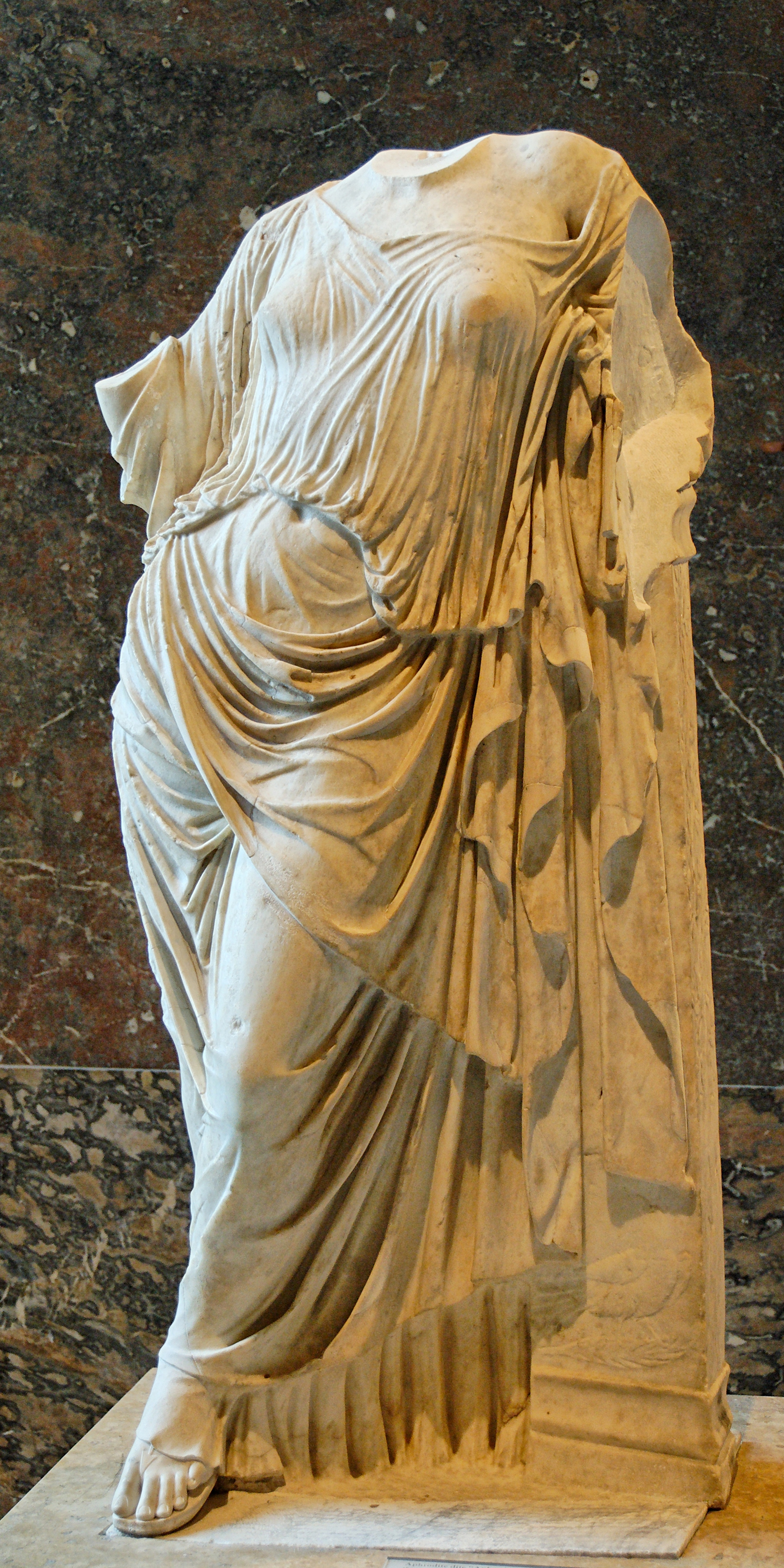
A Roman copy of a statue thought to be a reproduction of the Aphrodite of the Gardens by Alcamenes, Musée du Louvre.

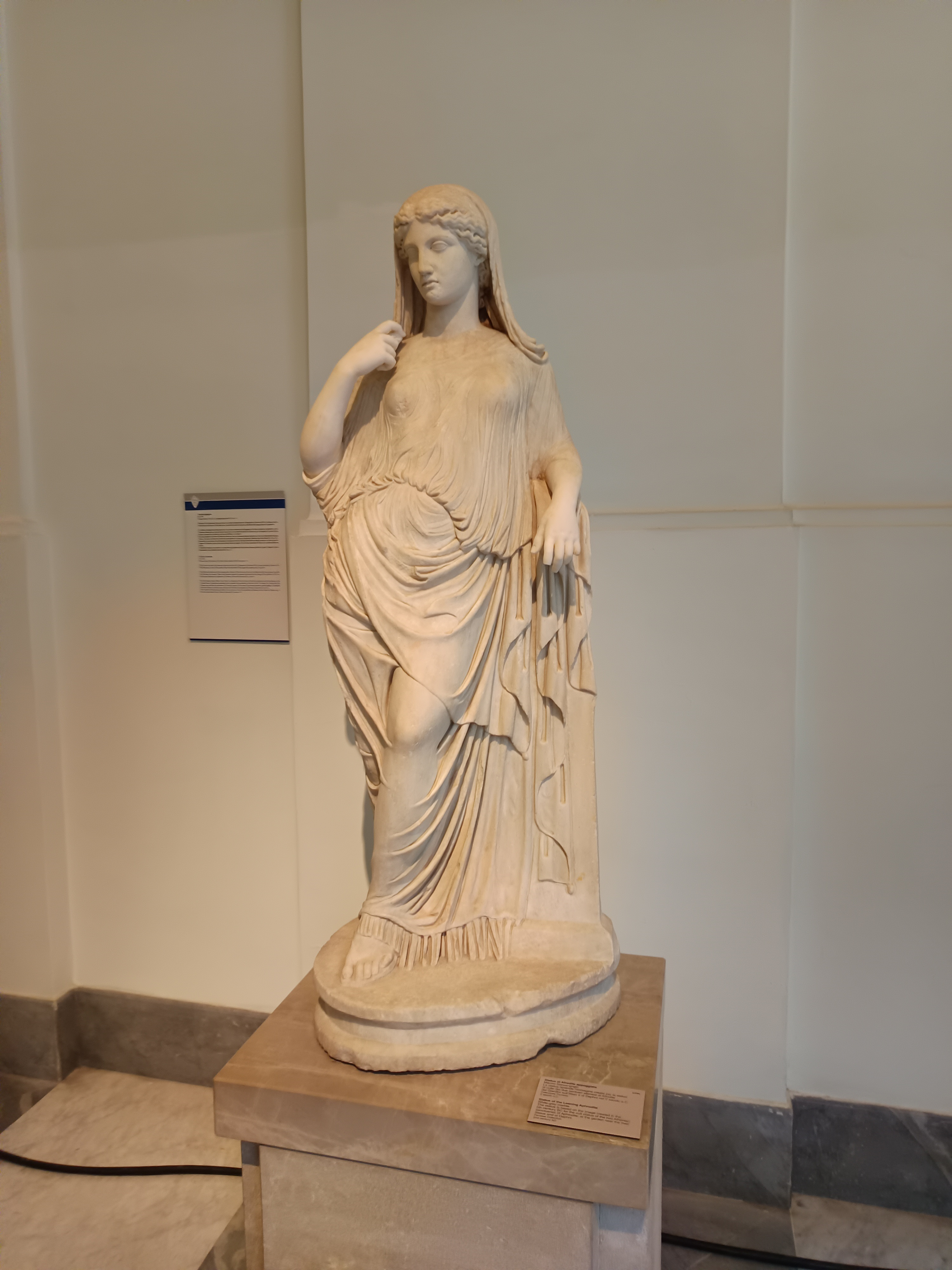
Venus (Aphrodite), Roman statue (marble) copy of Greek original, 2nd century AD (original 5th c. BC), Naples Archeological Museum (Museo Archeologico Nazionale)

Aphrodite of the Gardens (Ancient Greek: Ἀφροδίτη ἐν κήποις, romanized: Aphrodítē en kḗpois) is an epithet of the Greek goddess Aphrodite. The epithet describes her patronage over vegetation and garden fertility.

According to Pausanias, there was a sanctuary of Aphrodite of the Gardens near the Ilisos river, holding a famous cult statue of Aphrodite by Alcamenes and a herm of Aphrodite near the temple. It is unsure whether the statue of Aphrodite and the herm of Aphrodite were the same sculpture or two separate sculptures.

The herm of Aphrodite may be linked to the later mythological character, Hermaphroditos. There are numerous references to a male aspect of Aphrodite, called Aphroditos, which was imported to Athens from Cyprus in the late 5th century BC and also a temple of Hermaphroditos was spoken of by Alciphron at Athens.

== See also ==
- Aphrodite Urania
- Aphrodite of Knidos
