= Jacqueline Argüelles =

Mexican politician

- Born: 12 April 1968 (age 58); Mexico City, Mexico
- Occupation: Politician
- Political party: PVEM

Jacqueline Guadalupe Argüelles Guzmán (Note: In this Mexican name, the surname is Argüelles and the second or maternal family name is Guzmán.) (born 12 April 1968) is a Mexican politician affiliated with the Ecologist Green Party of Mexico (PVEM). In the 2003 mid-terms she was elected to the Chamber of Deputies for the 59th Congress as a plurinominal deputy.

== Biography ==
Jacqueline Argüelles was born in Mexico City. She holds a licentiate in communication sciences from the National Autonomous University of Mexico (UNAM). She started her career as a boarding crew member at Aeroméxico.

From September 2003 to August 2006, Deputy Jacqueline Argüelles was in charge of investigating Pemex's ecological and social damages.
