= Hermaphroditus =

Figure in Greek mythology

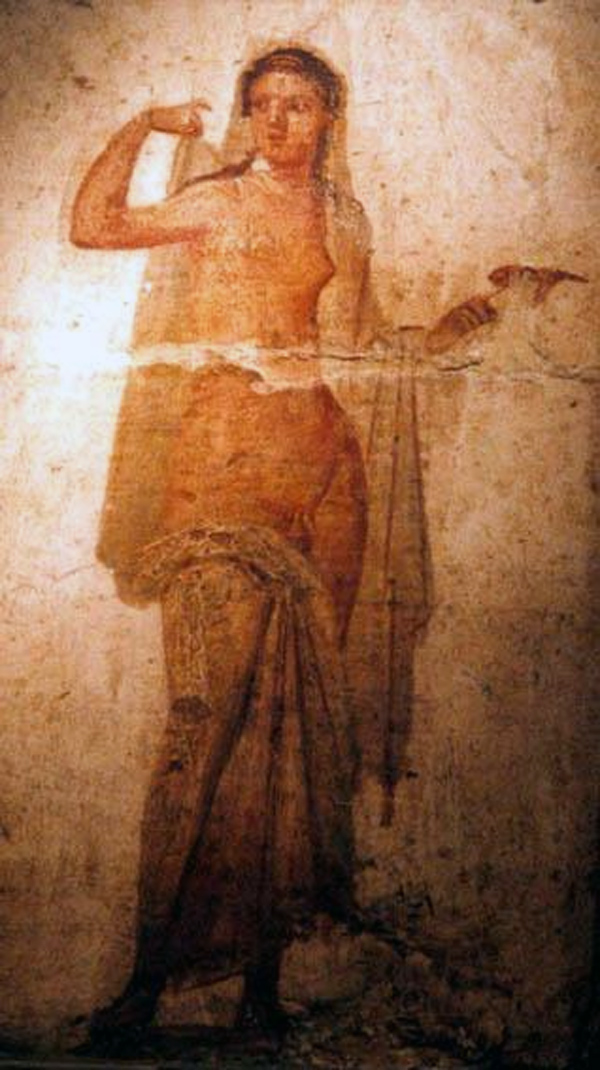
Herculaneum fresco 1–50 AD, National Archaeological Museum, Naples

In ancient Greek religion and mythology, Hermaphroditus (/hərˌmæfrəˈdaɪtəs/; Ancient Greek: Ἑρμαφρόδιτος, [hermapʰródi:tos]; sometimes conjugated with a feminine suffix as Hermaphrodite) is a minor deity of love symbolizing dual sexuality, androgyny, and the union of the sexes in marriage. He has an androgynous body combining both masculine and feminine physical characteristics.

Evidence of his cult in Athens existed in the fourth century BCE, and the origin of his dual sexuality varies depending on the ancient text being referenced. Diodorus Siculus describes him as the child of Hermes and Aphrodite, born with both male and female physical attributes. In Ovid's Metamorphoses, Hermaphroditus is introduced as a 15 year-old adolescent who was transformed after being forcibly embraced by the nymph Salmacis as she begged the gods to never let them be separated.

As a being of two sexes, Hermaphroditus reflected ancient concepts of dual sexuality, marriage and the union of male and female characteristics. A popular subject in Hellenistic art and Roman art, surviving artworks often depict him as an idealized youth with developed breasts and male genitalia.

== Etymology ==
Diodorus Siculus states the name is a combination of his parents' names, Hermes and Aphrodite. Scholars also suggest a possible connection between his name and the term herm, which is a type of classical structure associated with Hermes.

His variant name Hermaphrodite is the origin of the term hermaphrodite, which is Hermaphroditus with a feminine suffix as in Aphrodite.

== Symbolism ==
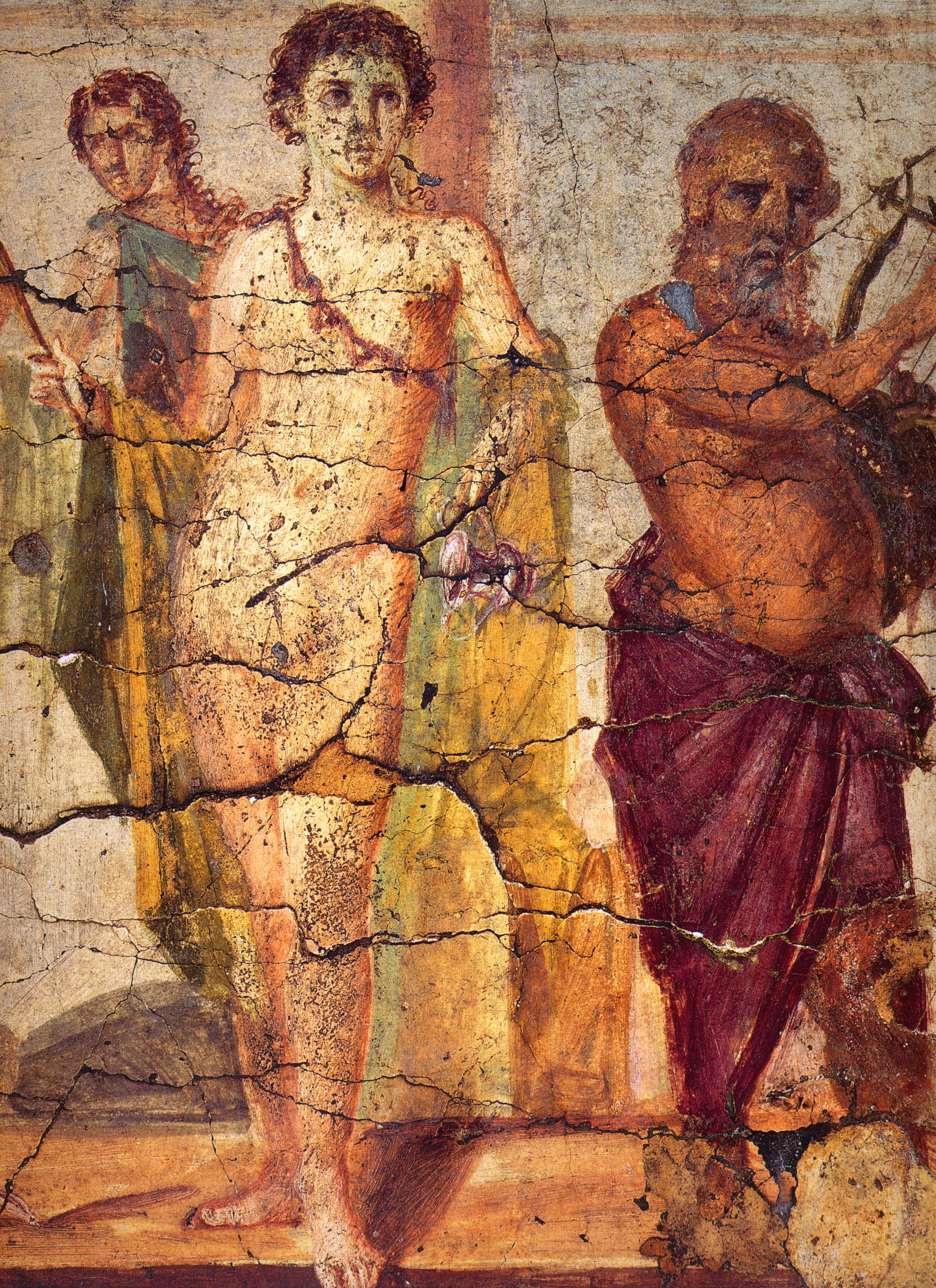
Hermaphroditos, holding a torch and a kantharos, between Silenus (right) and maenad (left); Roman fresco from the triclinium of the procurator in the Casa del Centenario (IX 8,3–6) in Pompeii

Hermaphroditus was associated with marriage and the union of male and female in some ancient traditions. A late Hellenistic inscription from Halicarnassus dated to approximately 128–100 BCE describes Hermaphroditus as first establishing the institution of marriage by law. Hugh Lloyd-Jones and other modern scholars have established this passage as evidence supporting the deity's association with marriage and the joining of both the feminine and the masculine.

Representations of Hermaphroditus also may have had a protective role in daily life as hypersexual figures were often used in Greek and Roman art as Apotropaia (objects imbued with the power to ward off evil).

In Roman domestic settings, images of Hermaphroditus have also been interpreted in relation to domestic harmony and marital concord. Katharine T. von Stackelberg suggests Hermaphroditus images in the home could express domestic harmony, emphasizing marital union and political concord.

== Mythology ==
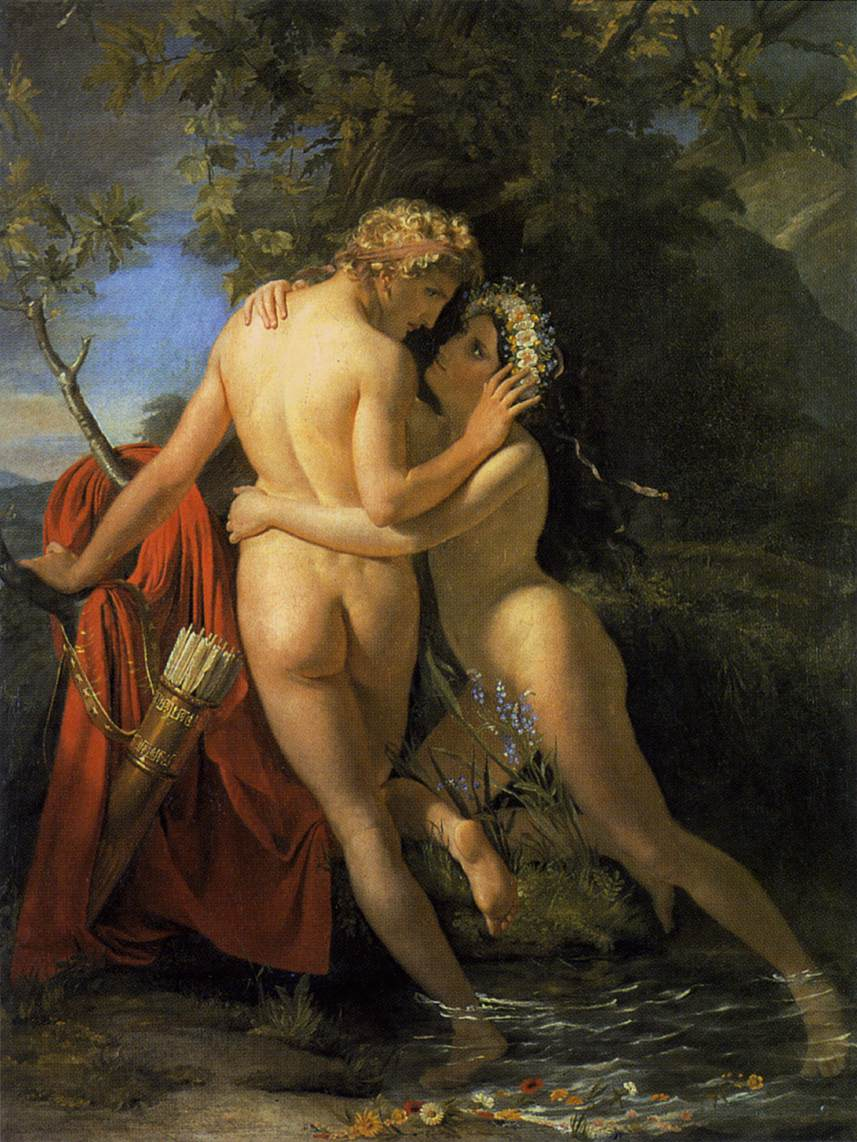
The Nymph Salmacis and Hermaphroditus by François-Joseph Navez (1829), based on Ovid's Metamorphoses

=== Salmacis and Halicarnassus ===
A late Hellenistic inscription of a poem discovered at Halicarnassus in roughly 128–100 BCE preserves a local tradition concerning Hermaphroditus and Salmacis. Salmacis receives and raises Hermaphroditus, who is subsequently credited with inventing marriage and being the first to bind married couples together by law.

This tradition differs substantially from the later account in Ovid's Metamorphoses, in which Salmacis first encounters Hermaphroditus when he is fifteen years old.

=== Diodorus Siculus ===
In the first century BCE, Diodorus Siculus describes Hermaphroditus as the child of Hermes and Aphrodite and explains his name as a combination of those of his parents. In this account, Hermaphroditus is born with a body combining male and female biological attributes.

Diodorus continues by reporting that some people regarded rare beings possessing characteristics of both sexes as monstrosities capable of portending future events, whether good or bad. This passage records one ancient belief concerning such births, rather than establishing a single Greco-Roman attitude toward them.

=== Ovid and Salmacis ===
The best-known surviving narrative concerning Hermaphroditus occurs in Book 4 of Ovid's Metamorphoses. Ovid presents Hermaphroditus as a fifteen-year-old boy, born to Hermes and Aphrodite and raised by Naiads on Mount Ida. He leaves his home to travel through Lycia and Caria.

At the spring of Salmacis, the nymph who dwells there is attracted to Hermaphroditus and approaches him, but he rejects her. When he is alone, he enters the spring and is followed by Salmacis. She forcibly embraces and kisses him while he struggles against her, begging the gods to never allow them to be separated.

The gods grant her request by merging their bodies into one form with feminine breasts and male genitalia. Hermaphroditus asks his parents, Hermes and Aphrodite, to enchant the spring so that any man who enters it will face the same fate.

=== Other ancient accounts ===
Ovid's transformation narrative differs from other surviving traditions in which Hermaphroditus's dual characteristics was established at birth. Åshede notes that the metamorphosis through the forced merging with Salmacis is unique to Ovid's account and is not reflected in surviving ancient images of Hermaphroditus. Åshede identifies Diodorus Siculus, the Salmacis inscription, Martial, and Greek epigrams among sources representing this alternative tradition.

== Cult and worship ==
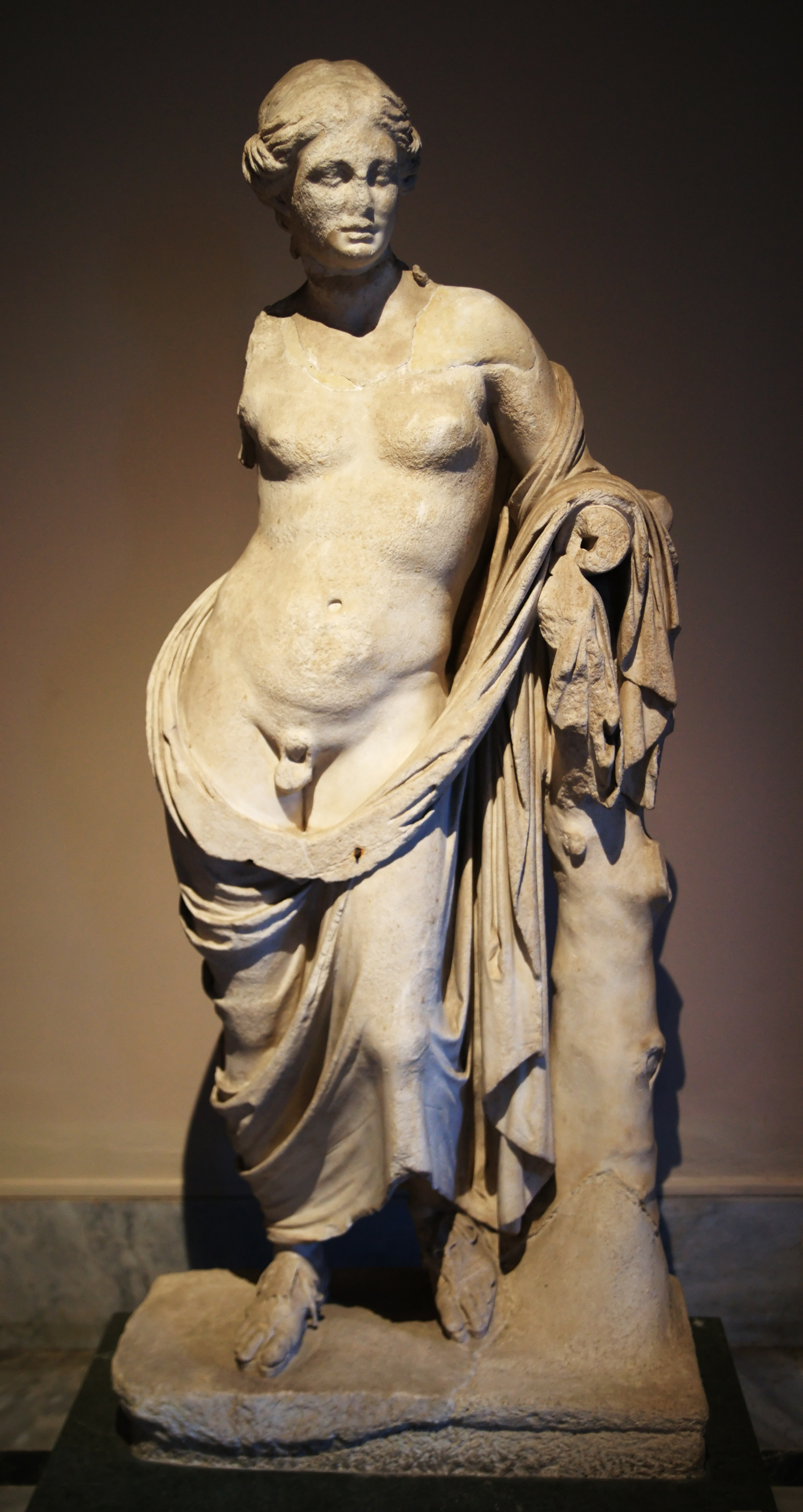
Hermaphroditus statue from Pergamum, Hellenistic, 3rd century BC (Istanbul)

The oldest traces of the cult in Greek countries are found in Cyprus. Here, according to Macrobius (Saturnalia, iii. 8), there was a bearded statue of a male Aphrodite, called Aphroditus by Aristophanes. According to Photius, Aphroditus and Hermaphroditus are the same god. Philochorus in his Atthis (ap. Macrobius loc. cit.) further identified Aphroditus, at whose sacrifices men and women exchanged garments, with the Moon. A terracotta plaque from the 7th century BC depicting Aphroditos, which was found in Perachora, suggests it was an archaic Greek cult.

The deification and the origins of the cult of Hermaphroditus beings stem from Eastern religions, where the hermaphrodite nature expressed the idea of a primitive being that united both sexes. This double sex also attributed to Dionysus and Priapus – the union in one being of the two principles of generation and conception – denotes extensive fertilizing and productive powers.

The earliest reference to him is in the Characters (16) of Theophrastus. After its introduction at Athens (probably in the 5th century BC), the importance of this deity seems to have declined. It appears no longer as the object of a special cult, but limited to the homage of certain sects, expressed by superstitious rites of obscure significance.

We find in Alciphron that there was at Athens a temple of Hermaphroditus. The passage proposes that he might be considered as the deity who presided over married people. The strict union between husband and wife would be aptly represented by a deity who was male and female inseparably blended together.

In the Greek Anthology, at the chapter in which describe the statues in the Baths of Zeuxippus, it also mentions and describes a statue of Hermaphroditus.

== Artistic renditions ==
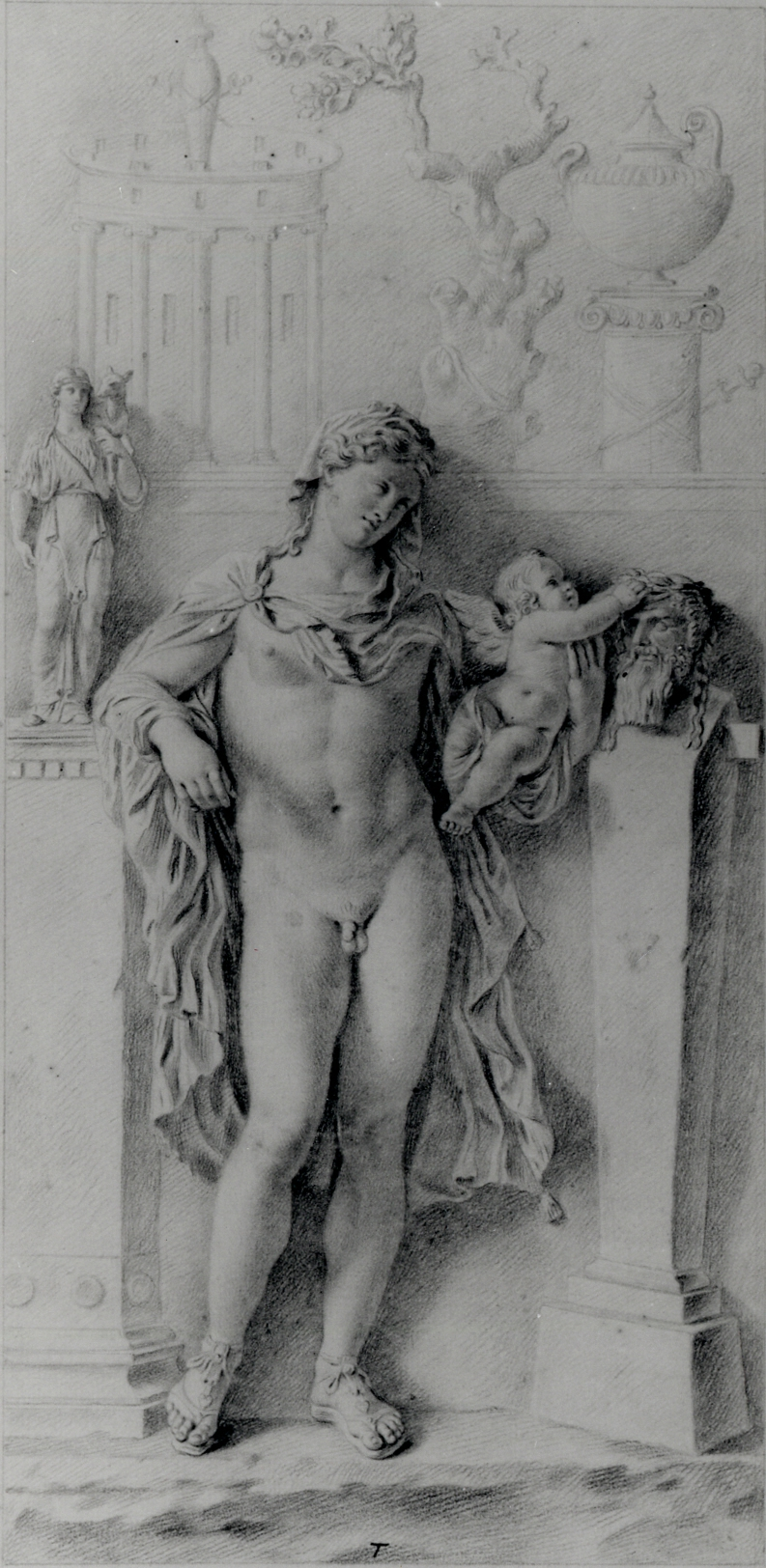
Drawing of a relief depicting Hermaphroditus and Eros crowning a herm by Antonio Maria Zanetti (c. 1721)

=== Literature ===
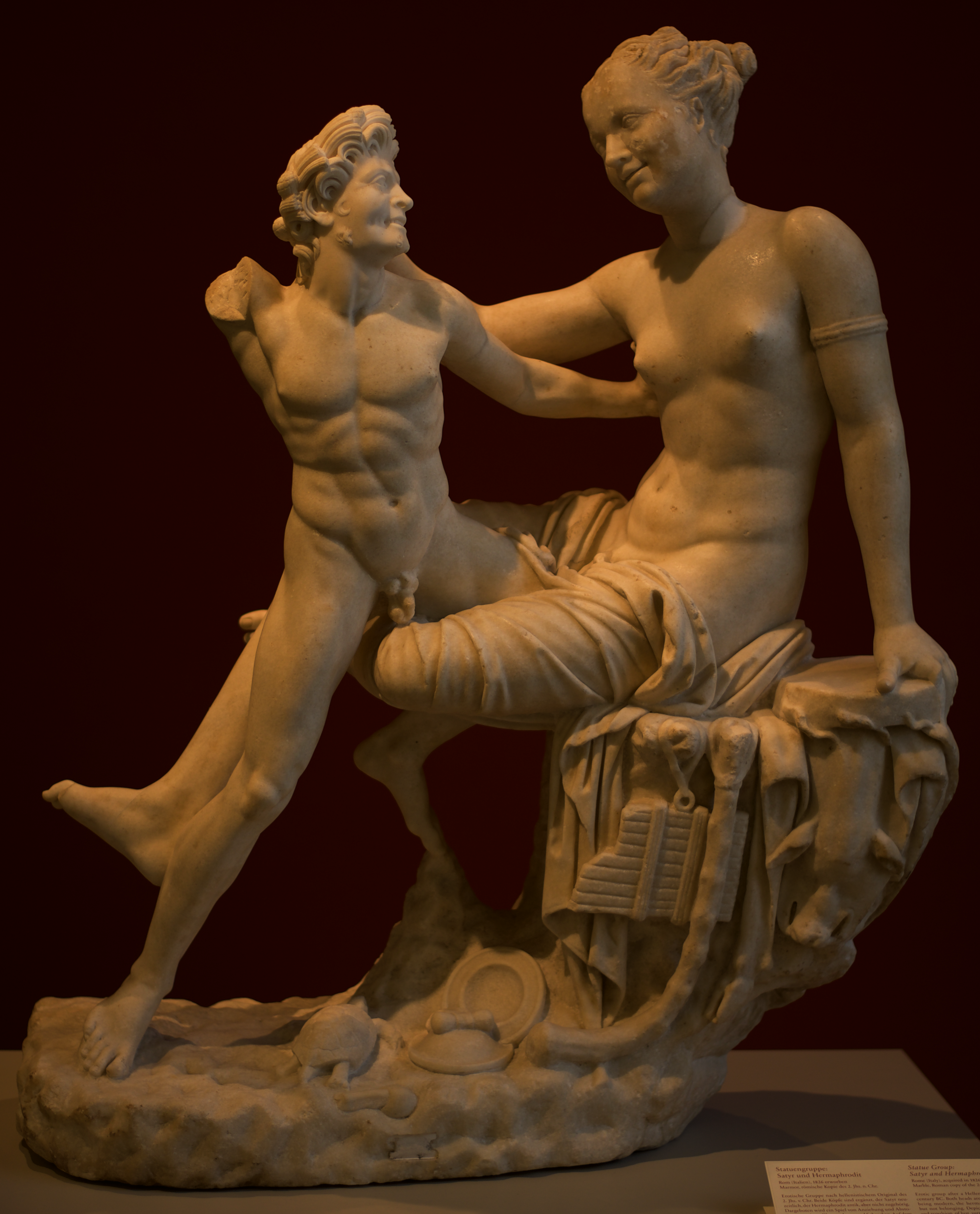
Statue of a satyr and Hermaphroditus. Roman copy of the 2nd century CE, after a Hellenistic original of the 2nd century BCE. Antikensammlung Berlin (Altes Museum)

The earliest mention of Hermaphroditus in Greek literature is by the philosopher Theophrastus (3rd century BC), in his book The Characters, XVI The Superstitious Man, in which he portrays various types of eccentric people.

Also on the fourth and seventh days of each month he will order his servants to mull wine, and go out and buy myrtle-wreaths, frankincense, and smilax; and, on coming in, will spend the day in crowning the Hermaphrodites.

This is likely a reference to Hermaphroditus' role as a marriage deity, as the fourth day of the month was considered the luckiest day to have a wedding.

The first mention of Hermes and Aphrodite as Hermaphroditus's parents was by the Greek historian Diodorus Siculus (1st century BC) in his book Bibliotheca historica, book IV, 4.6.5.

Hermaphroditus, as he has been called, who was born of Hermes and Aphrodite and received a name which is a combination of those of both his parents. Some say that this Hermaphroditus is a god and appears at certain times among men, and that he is born with a physical body which is a combination of that of a man and that of a woman, in that he has a body which is beautiful and delicate like that of a woman, but has the masculine quality and vigour of a man. But there are some who declare that such creatures of two sexes are monstrosities, and coming rarely into the world as they do they have the quality of presaging the future, sometimes for evil and sometimes for good.

The only full narration of his myth is that of Ovid's Metamorphoses, IV.274–388 (8 AD), where the emphasis is on the feminine snares of the lascivious water-nymph Salmacis and her compromising of Hermaphroditus' erstwhile budding manly strength, detailing his bashfulness and the engrafting of their bodies.

A rendering of the story into an epyllion, published anonymously in 1602, was later (1640) attributed by some to Francis Beaumont.

Ausonius, in his Epigramata de diversis rebus / Epigrams on various matters (4th century), also tells of Hermaphroditus' parentage and union with the nymph Salmacis.

On Hermaphroditus and his Nature—By Mercury begotten, conceived by Cythera, Hermaphroditus, compound alike in name and frame, combining either sex, complete in neither, neutral in love, unable to enjoy either passion.

On the Union of Salmacis and Hermaphroditus—The nymph Salmacis grew one with the mate she desired. Ah, happy maid, if she is conscious of a man's embrace. And twice happy thou, O youth, united with a lovely bride, if one being may still be two.

In the Palatine Anthology, IX.783 (980 AD), there is a reference to a sculpture of Hermaphroditus which was placed in a bath for both sexes. The passage IX.317 is in dialogue form, based on the dialogue between Hermaphroditus and Silenus. The latter claims that he has had sexual intercourse with Hermaphroditus three times. Hermaphroditus complains and objects to the fact by invoking Hermes in an oath, while Silenus invokes Pan for the reliability of his allegations.

Algernon Charles Swinburne's poem "Hermaphroditus" in Poems and Ballads is subscribed Au Musée du Louvre, Mars 1863, leaving no doubt that it was the Borghese Hermaphroditus that had inspired his ode.

=== Paintings and engravings ===
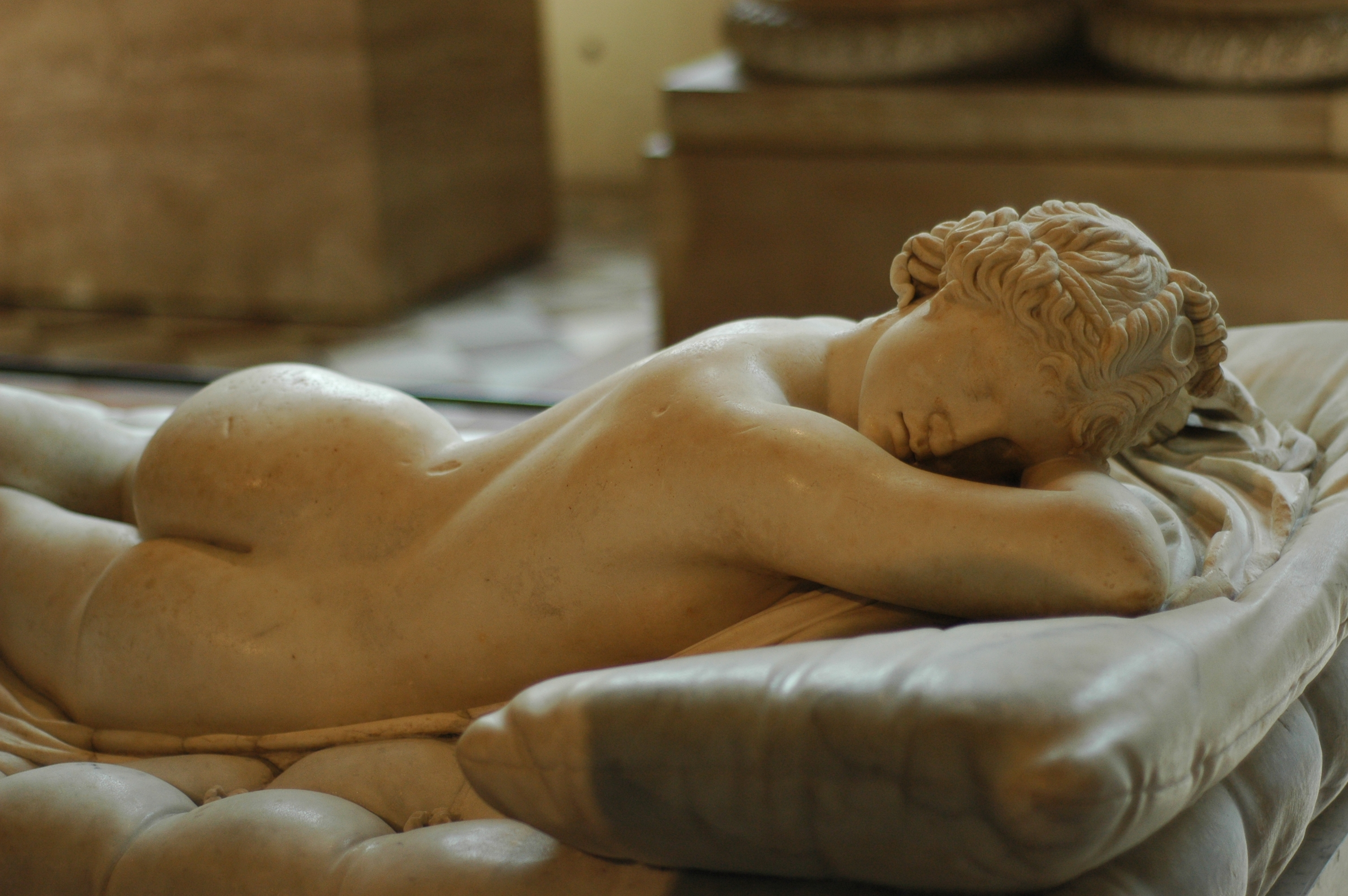
Borghese Hermaphroditus, Roman copy of the 2nd century AD (Louvre)

- In Greek vase painting Hermaphroditus was depicted as a winged youth with male and female attributes.
- Roman frescos found at Pompeii and Herculaneum show Hermaphroditus in various styles, alone and interacting with satyrs, Pan and Silenus.
- The Nymph Salmacis and Hermaphroditus by Francois-Joseph Navez, Museum of Fine Arts, Ghent
- Salmacis and Hermaphroditus by Bartholomeus Spranger, Kunsthistorisches Museum, Wien
- Salmacis and Hermaphroditus by Scarsellino, Galleria Borghese, Rome
- Salmacis and Hermaphroditus by Jean François de Troy
- Salmacis and Hermaphroditus by Ludovico Carracci
- Salmacis and Hermaphroditus by Francesco Albani
- Salmacis and Hermaphroditus by Giovanni Antonio Pellegrini
- Salmacis and Hermaphroditus by Jean-Auguste-Dominique Ingres
- Salmacis and Hermaphroditus by Bernard Picart
- Salmacis and Hermaphroditus by Johann Wilhelm Baur
- Salmacis and Hermaphroditus by Virgil Solis
- Hermaphroditus and Salmacis by Louis Finson
- The Nymph of Salmacis by Rupert Bunny
- Hermaphrodite Among Roses by Aubrey Beardsley
- Hermaphrodite Figure by Jacopo Pontormo
- The Metamorphosis of Hermaphrodite and Salmacis by Jan Gossaert (Jan Mabuse)
- Salmacis et Hermaphrodite by Jean Daullé

=== Sculpture ===
- The most famous sculpture of this figure is the Sleeping Hermaphroditus.
- Hermaphroditus, Palais des Beaux-Arts de Lille
- A life-size sculpture of Hermaphroditus from Pergamon is one of the largest found, standing 186.5 centimetres (73.4 in) tall, at the İstanbul Archaeology Museums.
- A statue by John Henry Foley was shown at the 1851 Great Exhibition and later donated to the Bancroft Gardens, Stratford-upon-Avon, where it now stands.
- A marble statue of Hermaphroditus was found near the south end of the Garden of the House of Loreius Tiburtinus. II.2.2. Room 13.

=== Theatre ===
- Hermaphroditus is a now-lost third century BC Greek tragedy by Posidippus.
- The 1639 Italian opera La Delia features Hermaphroditus as a comedic minor character serving a role of secretary and informant for Jupiter, similar to the roles of eunuchs in the Byzantine Empire such as John the Orphanotrophos. Along with Achilleid, it has been speculated to have inspired Achille in Sciro.

== See also ==
- Intersex people in history
