= List of mayors of Bonn =

This is a list of mayors of Bonn. The list includes the mayors (Oberbürgermeister) since 1800, as well as the city managers (Oberstadtdirektoren) from 1947 until 1996 when the office was terminated.

== Mayors (Oberbürgermeister) ==
- 1800–1802: Johann Joseph Eichhoff
- 1802–1804: Nicolas Joseph Lejeune (kommissarisch)
- 1804–1816: Anton Maria Karl Graf von Belderbusch
- 1816–1816: Peter Joseph Eilender (kommissarisch)
- 1817–1839: Johann Martin Joseph Windeck
- 1840–1850: Karl Edmund Joseph Oppenhoff
- 1851–1875: Leopold Kaufmann
- 1875–1891: Hermann Jakob Doetsch
- 1891–1919: Wilhelm Spiritus
- 1920–1922: Fritz Bottler, German People's Party
- 1923–1931: Dr. Johannes Nepomuk Maria Falk
- 1932–1933: Dr. Franz Wilhelm Lürken
- 1933–1945: Ludwig Rickert, NSDAP
- 1945–1948: Eduard Spoelgen
- 1948–1951: Dr. Peter Stockhausen, CDU
- 1951–1956: Peter Maria Busen, CDU
- 1956–1969: Dr. Wilhelm Daniels, CDU
- 1969–1975: Peter Kraemer, CDU
- 1975–1994: Dr. Hans Daniels, CDU
- 1994–2009: Bärbel Dieckmann, SPD
- 2009–2015: Jürgen Nimptsch, SPD
- 2015–2020: Ashok-Alexander Sridharan, CDU
- 2020–2025: Katja Dörner, Alliance 90/The Greens
- 2025– : Guido Déus, CDU

== City managers (Oberstadtdirektoren) ==
- 1947–1956: Dr. Johannes Langendörfer
- 1956–1964: Dr. Franz Schmidt CDU
- 1964–1975: Dr. Wolfgang Hesse CDU
- 1976–1987: Dr. Karl-Heinz van Kaldenkerken CDU
- 1987–1996: Dieter Diekmann CDU

== See also ==
- Timeline of Bonn
