= Fulgencio =

Fulgencio (Spanish pronunciation: [fulˈxenθjo, fulˈxensjo]) is a Spanish male given name. It is derived from the Latin name Fulgentius, which means "bright, brilliant".

== People ==
=== First name ===
- Fulgentius of Cartagena (?–c. 630), Bishop of Écija, Hispania
- Fulgentius of Ruspe (462 or 467–527 or 533), Bishop of Ruspe, North Africa
- Fulgencio Aquino (1915–1994), Venezuelan musician and songwriter
- Fulgencio Argüelles (born 1955), Spanish writer and psychologist
- Fulgencio Batista (1901–1973), President and dictator of Cuba
- Fulgencio Berdugo (1918–2003), Colombian footballer
- Fulgencio Coll Bucher (born 1948), Spanish general
- Fulgencio García (1880–1945), Colombian musician and composer
- Fulgencio García de Solís, Colonial-era governor of Florida and Honduras
- Fulgencio R. Moreno (1872–1933), Paraguayan journalist, financial expert, statesman and historian
- Fulgencio Vega (1805–1868), Supreme Director of Nicaragua
- Fulgencio Yegros (1780–1821), Paraguayan soldier and first head of state of independent Paraguay
- Fulgencio Zúñiga (born 1977), Colombian professional boxer
- Fulgencio (born 2004) (Zoltán Plavecz) Hungarian singer and songwriter

=== Surname ===
- Edgardo Fulgencio (1917–2004), Filipino basketball player
- Luna Fulgencio (born 2011), Spanish actress and writer
- Ruth Aguilar Fulgencio (born 1975), Spanish Paralympic athlete

== Geography ==
- San Fulgencio, village in Alicante, Spain

== Film and TV ==
- Don Fulgencio, 1950 Argentine film
- Fulgencio Joseph Pritchett, a character in Modern Family
- Fulgencio (Modern Family), an episode of Modern Family
- Fulgencio Capulet, character in Romeo + Juliet
