= Fulgentius =

Fulgentius is a Latin male given name which means "bright, brilliant". It may refer to:

- Fabius Planciades Fulgentius (5th–6th century), Latin grammarian
- Saint Fulgentius of Ruspe (5th–6th century), bishop of Ruspe, North Africa, possibly related to the above; some authorities believe them to be the same person
- Fulgentius Ferrandus (6th century), deacon of Carthage, Fulgentius of Ruspe's pupil and biographer
- Saint Fulgentius of Cartagena (6th–7th century), bishop of Écija, Hispania
- Gottschalk of Orbais, nicknamed Fulgentius (9th century), monk, theologian and poet

== See also ==
- Fulgencio
- Fulgence
