= Katja Dörner =

German politician, Lord mayor of Bonn

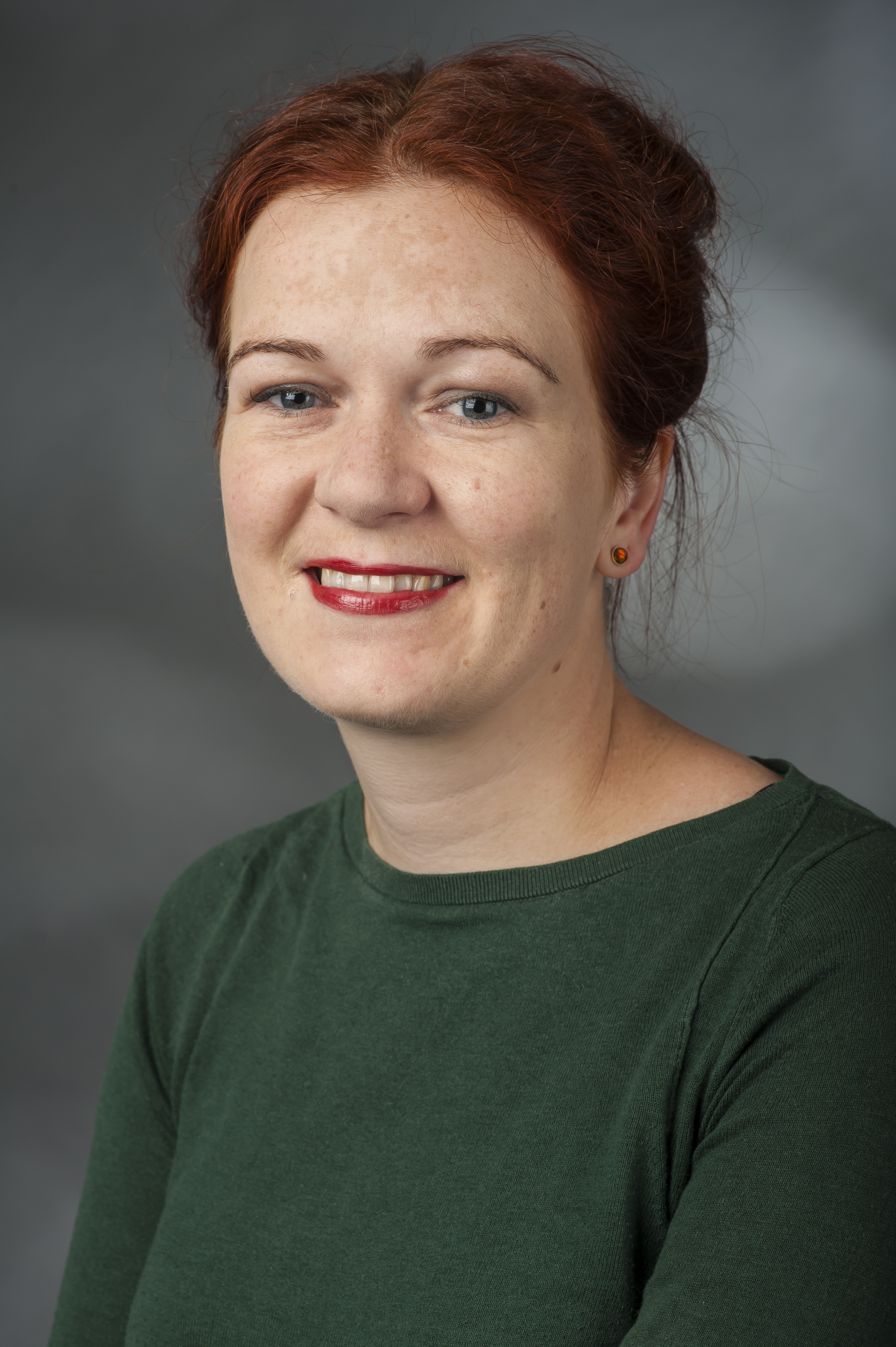
- Dörner in 2014

Mayor of Bonn
- In office 1 November 2020 – 1 November 2025
- Preceded by: Ashok-Alexander Sridharan
- Succeeded by: Guido Déus

Member of the Bundestag for North Rhine-Westphalia
- In office 27 October 2009 – 31 October 2020
- Succeeded by: Janosch Dahmen
- Constituency: Alliance '90/The Greens List

Personal details
- Born: 18 February 1976 (age 50) Siegen, West Germany (now Germany)
- Party: Greens
- Children: 1

Katja Dörner (born 18 February 1976) is a German politician of the Alliance 90/The Greens who has been serving as mayor of Bonn since 2020. From 2009 until 2020, she was a member of the Bundestag.

== Education and early career ==
Dörner studied political science in at the universities of Bonn, York and Edinburgh from 1995 until 2000.

From 2001 until 2003, Dörner worked as a legislative adviser to Sylvia Löhrmann, then the chairwoman of the Green Party's parliamentary group in the Landtag of North Rhine-Westphalia. She subsequently advised the parliamentary group on education and vocational training policies from 2003 until 2009.

== Political career ==
Dörner first became a member of the German Bundestag in the 2009 elections, representing North Rhine-Westphalia. In parliament, she served on the Committee on Family Affairs, Senior Citizens, Women, and Youth. From 2009 until 2013, she was also a member of the Budget Committee, where she served as rapporteur on the annual budget of the Federal Ministry of the Interior. In addition to her committee assignments, she was a member of the German-British Parliamentary Friendship Group.

From 2013 until 2020, Dörner served as vice-chair of the Green Party's parliamentary group, under the leadership of Katrin Göring-Eckardt and Anton Hofreiter.

In the – unsuccessful – negotiations to form a coalition government with the Christian Democrats – both the Christian Democratic Union (CDU) and the Christian Social Union in Bavaria (CSU) – and the Free Democratic Party following the 2017 elections, Dörner was part of her party's delegation.

In August 2019, Dörner announced her intention to become Mayor of Bonn. She was elected in a run-off election on 27 September 2020 with 56.27% of the vote, becoming Bonn's second-ever female mayor.

In the negotiations to form a coalition government under the leadership of Minister-President of North Rhine-Westphalia Hendrik Wüst following the 2022 state elections, Dörner was part of her party’s delegation.

== Other activities ==
=== Government bodies ===
- German Council for Sustainable Development (RNE), Member (since 2023, appointed ad personam by Chancellor Olaf Scholz)

=== Non-profit organizations ===
- Bonn International Award for Democracy, Chair of the Board of Trustees (since 2022)
- Institut Solidarische Moderne (ISM), Member (since 2010)
- German Foundation for World Population (DSW), Member of the Parliamentary Advisory Board (–2020)
- Plan International Deutschland, Member of the Board of Trustees
- Amnesty International, Member

== Personal life ==
Dörner has lived in Bonn since 1995. In Berlin, she shared an apartment with Oliver Krischer.
