= Bonn Egyptian Museum =

Coordinates: 50°44′4″N 7°6′20″E

Bonn Egyptian Museum (German: Ägyptisches Museum Bonn) is an archaeological museum for ancient Egyptian antiquities located in Bonn, Germany. The museum is part of the University of Bonn. It presents a selection of the most important collection of original objects from Ancient Egypt in North Rhine-Westphalia.

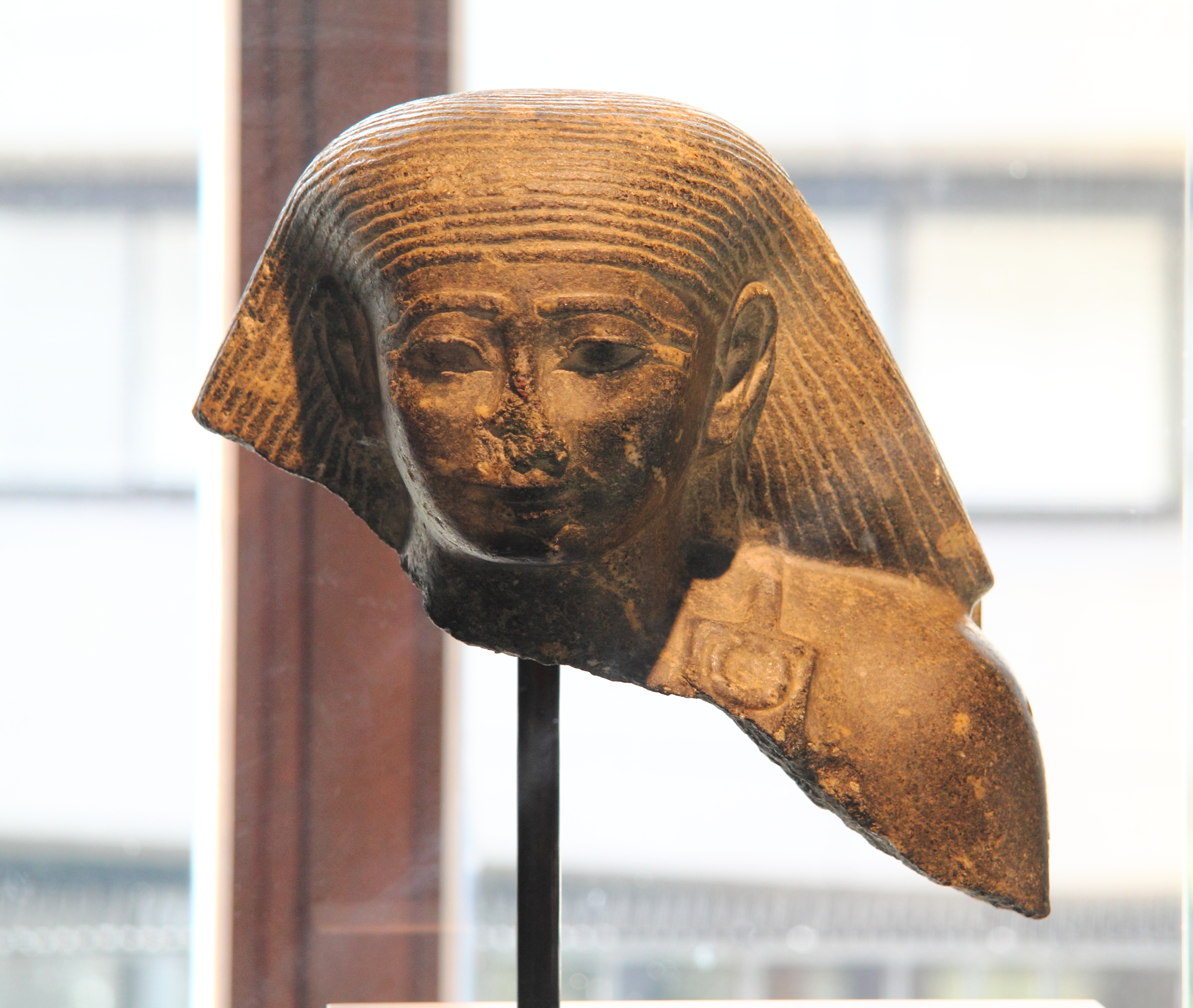
The "Bonn Scribe", an important exhibit of the museum

The Bonn Egyptian Museum was founded in 2001. The central part of the museum is the permanent exhibition, which is dedicated to the cultural history of Egypt. The collection, however, dates back to the 19th century and was formerly part of the Akademisches Kunstmuseum. Large parts of the collection were destroyed in World War II. Today, the collection comprises about 3,000 objects.

Regular special events and children's excursions are held at the museum.
