= Ashok-Alexander Sridharan =

German politician

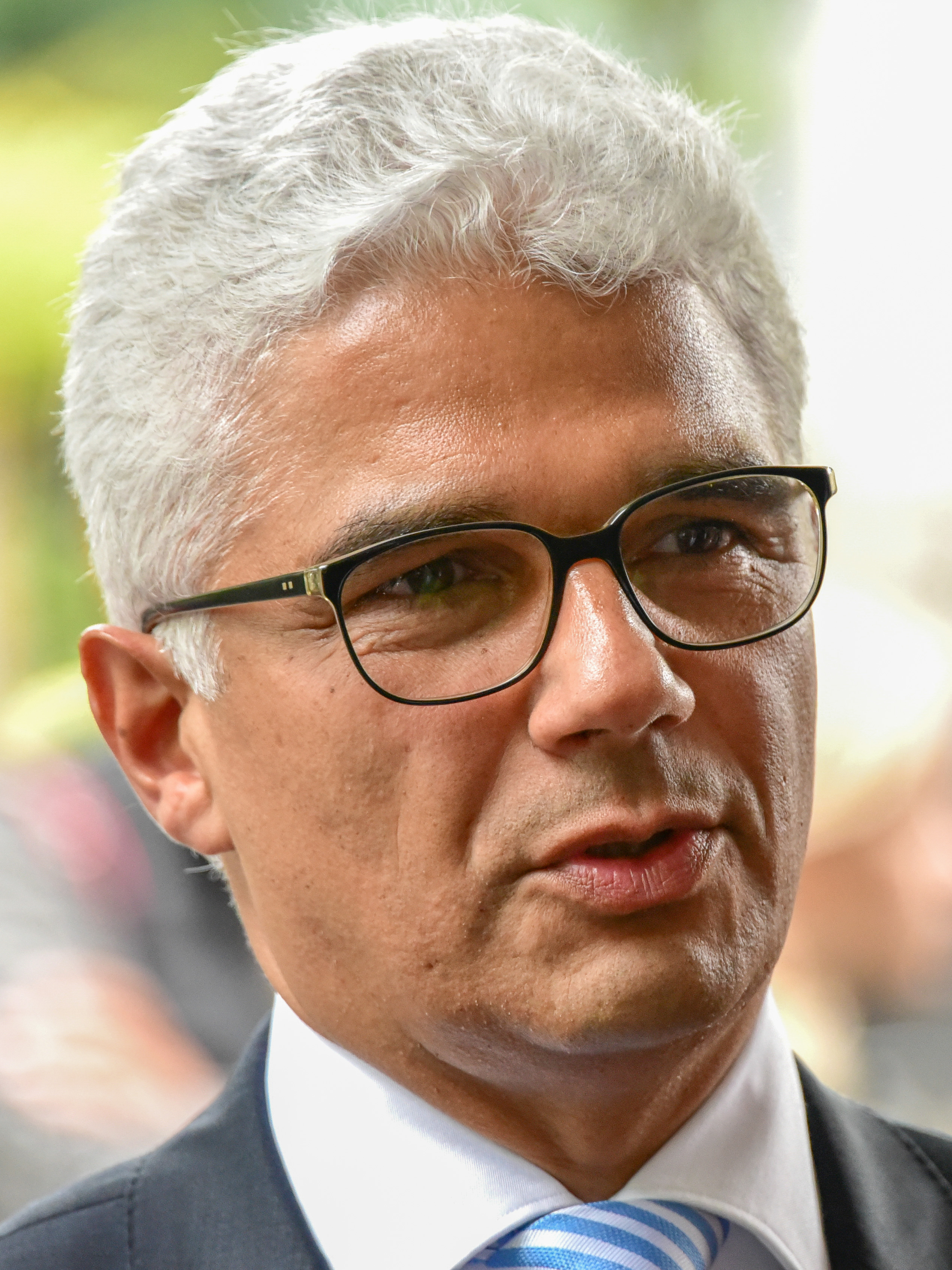

Mayor of Bonn
- In office 21 October 2015 – 31 October 2020
- Preceded by: Jürgen Nimptsch
- Succeeded by: Katja Dörner

Personal details
- Born: June 15, 1965 (age 60) Bonn, West Germany (now Germany)

Ashok-Alexander Sridharan is a German politician partly of Indian ancestry who served as Mayor of Bonn from 2015 until 2020. He is a member of the Christian Democratic Union of Germany (CDU). He was the first mayor of Bonn to be of an immigrant background.

== Early life and education ==
Sridharan was born in Bonn on June 15, 1965 to a diplomat from Chennai, India, who moved to West Germany in the 1950s, and a mother from Bonn. He spent his childhood and university years in Bonn, which he used to brand himself as a "Bonn lad" during his campaign. He studied at the Aloisiuskolleg, a private and Catholic high school in Bonn, before studying law at the University of Bonn.

In an interview with Deutsche Welle, Sridharen stated that his Indian roots weren't relevant to his campaign. He also stated, "I think [Indian interests] could even contribute efforts to make Bonn better-known internationally than it already is and that would do us good. We have many international companies and organizations here and I feel we have to strengthen that". Due to his ancestry, Sridharan has noted that there has been negative attention towards him through xenophobic comments.

== Political career ==
Sridharan won the mayoral elections for the city of Bonn on September 13, 2015 to succeed Social Democratic Party (SPD)'s Jürgen Nimptsch. In the polls, he defeated his opponent Peter Ruhenstroth-Bauer from the SPD, by polling just over 50% of the votes, while Ruhenstroth-Bauer polled 24% of the votes, in an election that saw a 45% turnout. He assumed office on October 21, 2015.

On September 27, 2020, Sridharan lost the mayoral runoff election to the green party challenger Katja Dörner. In a runoff that saw an overall turnout of 49%, Dörner polled 56% of the votes, while Sridharan polled 44% of the votes. In the first round polls that had concluded on September 13, 2020, Sridharan polled highest with 34% votes, but this was not sufficient to claim an absolute majority and had forced the runoff. Dörner had polled 28% in the first round. Earlier, having expressed his intent to run for second term, he was nominated by the CDU in November 2019. Dörner took office as new mayor on November 1, 2020.

== Other activities ==
=== Corporate boards ===
- Stadtwerke Bonn Verkehrs-GmbH (SWBV), Member of the Supervisory Board (2015-2020)

=== Non-profit organizations ===
- Konrad Adenauer Foundation, Member
- Development and Peace Foundation (SEF), Member of the Board of Trustees
- Internationaler Demokratiepreis Bonn, Member of the Board of Trustees
