= Consuelo Argüelles Loya =

Mexican politician

- Born: 19 January 1977 (age 49); Miguel Hidalgo, D.F., Mexico
- Occupation: Deputy
- Political party: PAN

Consuelo Argüelles Loya (born 19 January 1977) is a Mexican politician affiliated with the PAN. As of 2013 she served as Deputy of the LXII Legislature of the Mexican Congress representing Nuevo León.
