= Schürmann-Bau =

Office building in Bonn, Germany

Coordinates: 50.717°N 7.1275°E

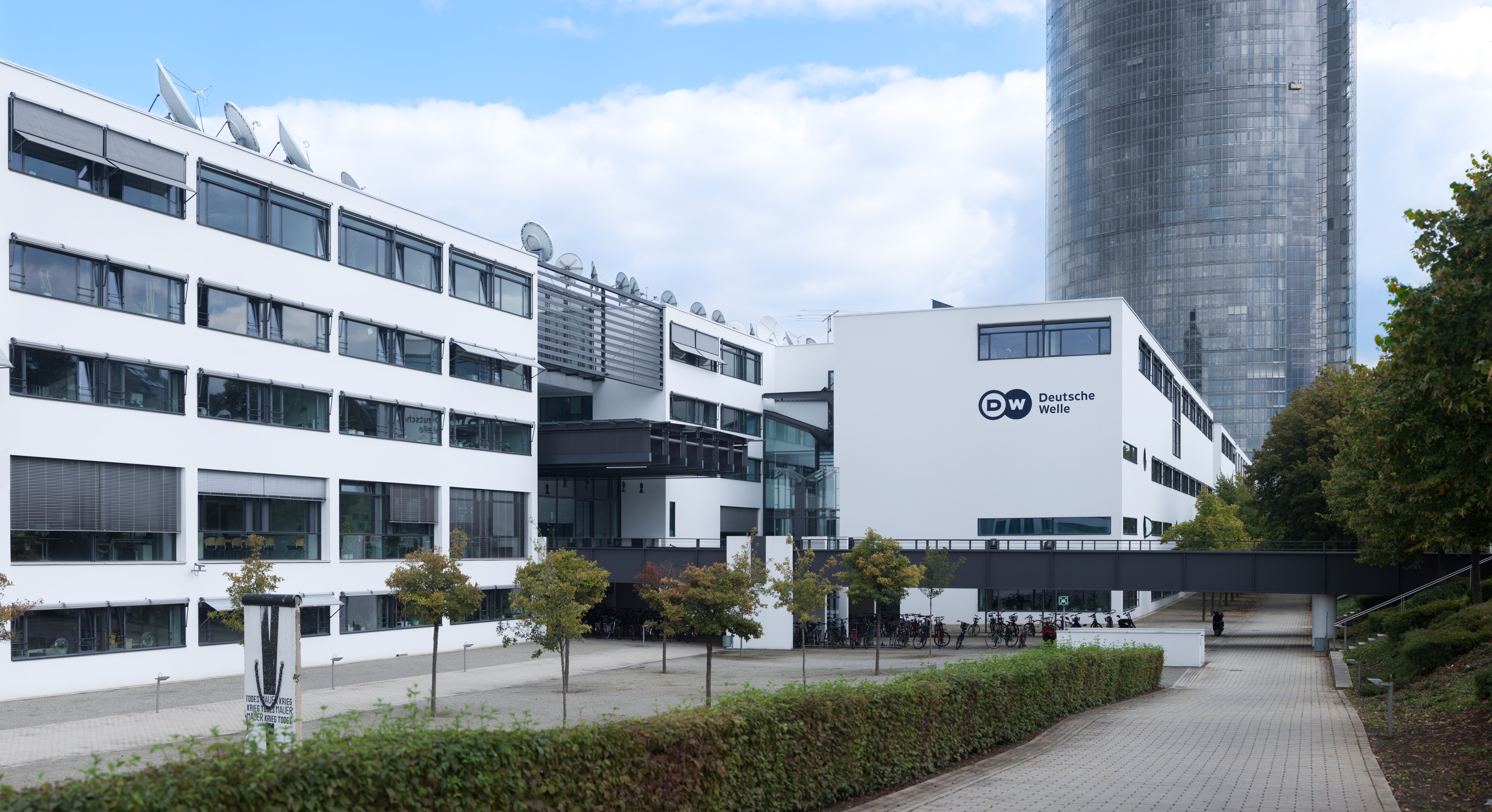
The Schürmann-Bau with the Post Tower in the background

The Schürmann-Bau is an office building in the Gronau district of Bonn constructed in 2002. It was named after its architect, Joachim Schürmann . Since July 2003, the building has housed the headquarters of the German public broadcaster Deutsche Welle, although it was originally planned as an office building for the members of the Bundestag.

During the building's construction, the site was heavily damaged by a flood of the river Rhine in December 1993. The damaged construction site underwent renovations that cost an estimated 700 million euros, making it one of the most expensive construction projects in German post-war history.

Starting in 2024, the German TV channel Phoenix is supposed to move into the building.

== Location ==
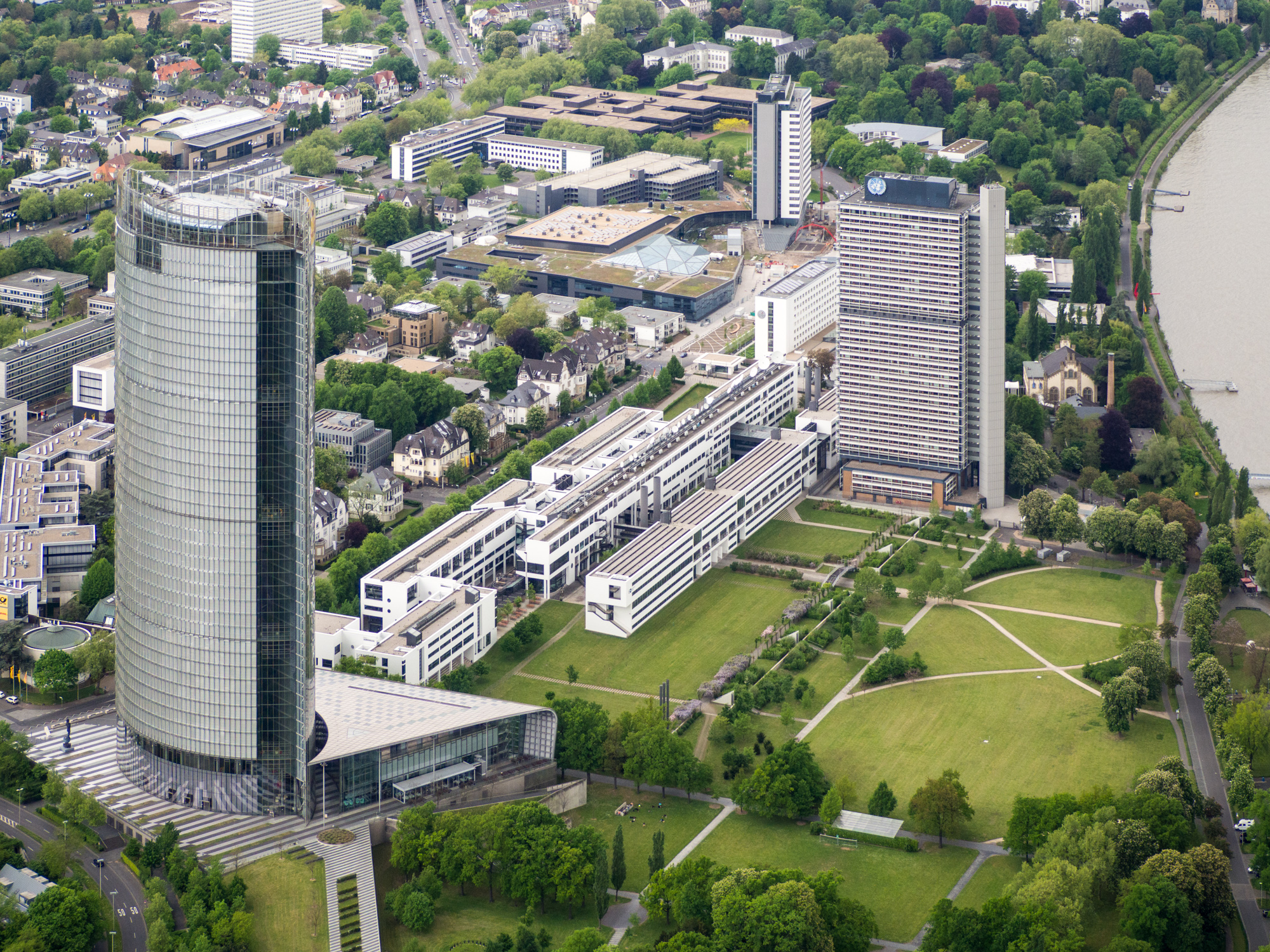
From left to right: the Post Tower, the Schürmann-Bau and the Langer Eugen.

The Schürmann-Bau is located on the east side of the Kurt-Schumacher-Straße, its length taking up 300 m, opposite to the villas on the west side. It can be found in between the Post Tower and the former Hermann-Ehlers-Straße and borders on the Bundeshaus in the north and the Langer Eugen in the north-east.

== History ==
In the early 1980s, the Bundestag decided to build the Schürmann-Bau to couneract the lack of room in the Langer Eugen highrise. In 1983 the draft of the Schürmann architecture firm was chosen and the construction of the building started in 1989 and was expected to be finished in 1995. As part of the construction, sports facilities and the Gronaustadion were demolished.

=== Flooding ===
During construction, the flooding of river Rhine in 1993 led to a rise of the ground-water level. This caused the shell of the unfinished building to rise up to 70 cm above its original level. Although this could have been prevented by a controlled flooding of its underground parking garage, it was not, as there was a dispute over competence on the part of the construction management. After the flooding, the shell returned to its original level in an inconsistent manner. This damaged the building shell.

With whom the responsibility lies has been the subject of political and legal disputes. In 2006, fourteen years after the flood, the German state settled with three construction companies, who had to pay 55 million euros. Furthermore, an agreement was made with the architect (not Schürmann), who had been responsible for the supervision of the construction, out of court.

=== Further construction ===
In 1997 plans were made to remediate the building and since 2002 the building is operational. The German public broadcaster Deutsche Welle uses the building as its headquarters since 2003. The management of the property was initially the responsibility of the Bundes- und Landesliegenschaftsbetreuung Nordrhein-Westfalen, however it was later transferred to the Bundesamt für Bauwesen und Raumordnung in 2007. Some parts of the building had been constructed in an inadequate manner, the defects are supposed to be repaired in 2019 and 2020 following a lengthy legal dispute.

In 2022, the German television channel Phoenix announced that it would also be moving from the former ZDF studio in Bonn to the Schürmann Building in 2024.

== Reception ==
In 2004, the Schürmann-Baiu received one of five architecture prizes awarded every three years by the Association of German Architects.

== Art ==
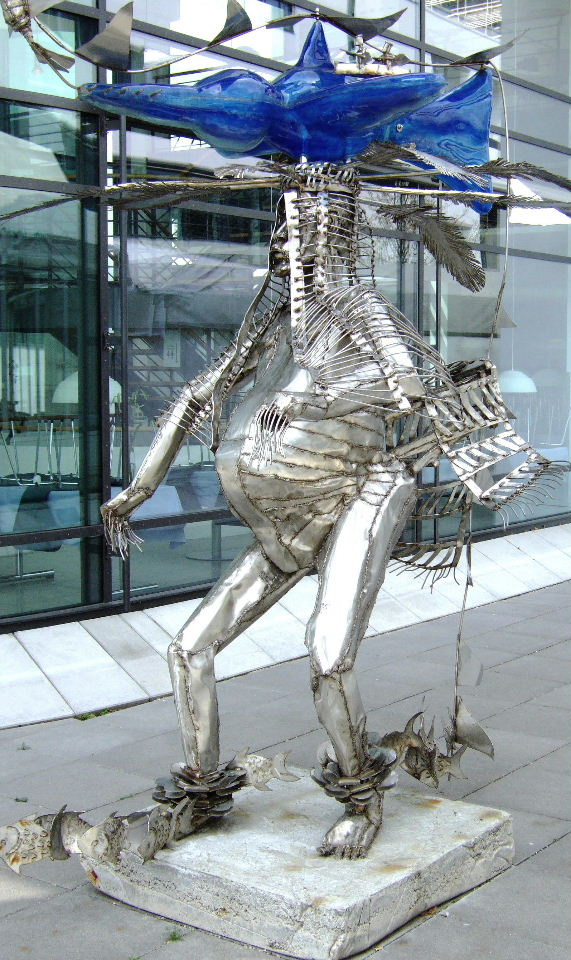
"Fest für Neptun" - Celebration for Neptune

Starting from September 2004, a series of art objects created by international artists have been on display outside the Schürmann-Bau building. The collection features artworks such as "Fest für Neptun" by Sokari Douglas Camp, "Ich und der Hahn - Hören und Sehen" by Babak Saed and "Comunicación cruzada" by Manuel Marin.
