= Heimatmuseum Beuel =

Museum in Bonn, Germany

Coordinates: 50°44′7″N 7°7′5″E

The Heimatmuseum Beuel is a local history museum in Bonn, Germany. The museum was established in 1986 on the initiative of Beuel's Local Historical Society.

The museum is divided into four buildings, which form a closed courtyard, in former Steinerstraße, now Wagnergasse. The oldest of the four buildings dates back to 1662.

The museum focuses on the historical development of the area of Beuel from Roman times to the present, especially on what used to be Beuel's main pre-industrial trade, its laundries. The exhibition also contains various furnishing objects, an old school room and a hairdressing room. Outside is a herb garden, some old gravestones and two aerial bombs.

The museum is entirely run by retired volunteers, who also offer guided tours of the site.
