= María Argüelles Arellano =

Mexican politician

- Born: 2 July 1963 (age 62); Zacatecas, Mexico
- Occupation: Politician
- Political party: PAN

María del Consuelo Argüelles Arellano (born 2 July 1963) is a Mexican politician from the National Action Party. From 2008 to 2009 she served as Deputy of the LX Legislature of the Mexican Congress representing Zacatecas.
