= Guido Déus =

German politician (born 1968)

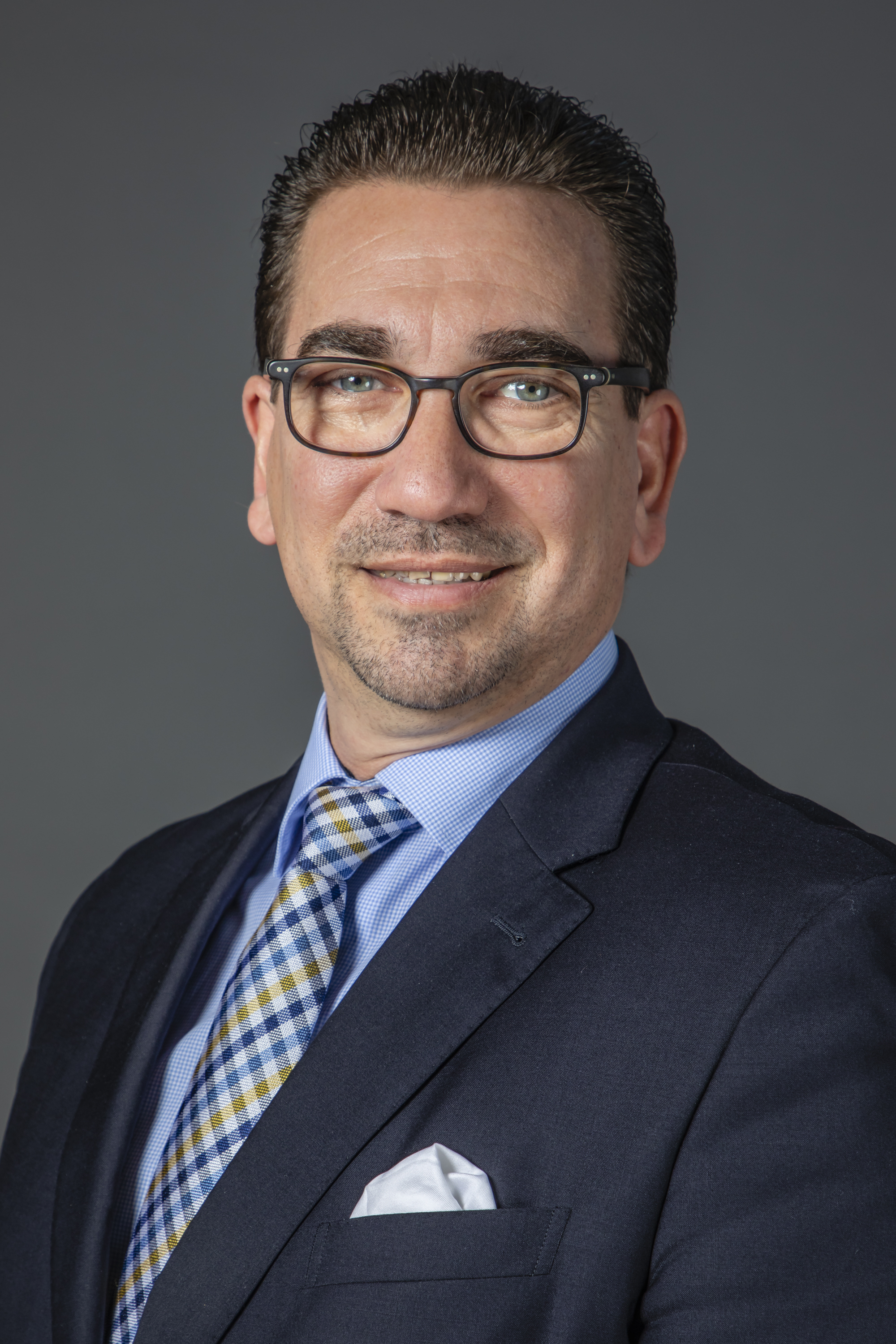
- Déus in 2019

Mayor of Bonn
- Incumbent
- Assumed office 1 November 2025
- Preceded by: Katja Dörner

Personal details
- Born: 29 May 1968 (age 58) Cologne
- Party: Christian Democratic Union (since 1987)

Guido Déus (born 29 May 1968 in Cologne) is a German politician serving as mayor of Bonn since 2025. From 2017 to 2025, he was a member of the Landtag of North Rhine-Westphalia.
