= Akademisches Kunstmuseum =

Art museum in Bonn

Coordinates: 50°43′54.00″N 7°06′22″E

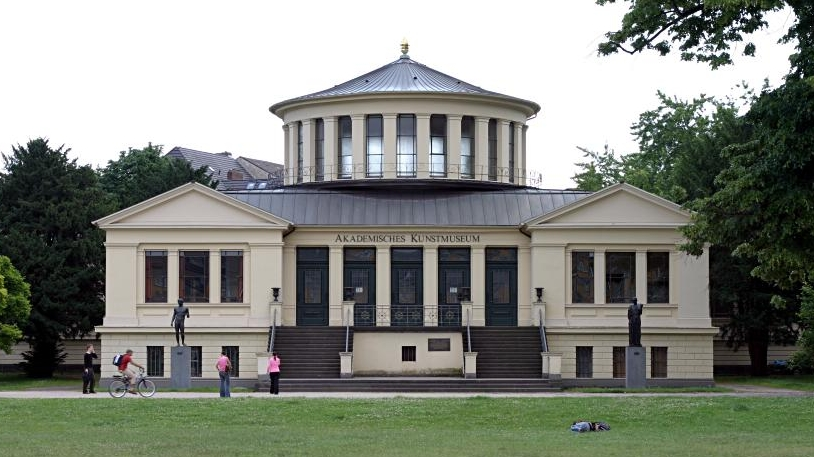
Exterior

Akademisches Kunstmuseum (Academic Art Museum) is an art museum in Bonn, Germany. It is one of the oldest museums in Bonn and houses the antique collection of the University of Bonn with more than 2,700 plaster casts of antique statues and reliefs, and over 25,000 originals. It is located in a neoclassical building at the southern end of the Hofgarten, near the Electoral Palace. During the renovation of the historic building, the museum can currently be visited at Römerstraße 164 in 53117 Bonn.

The museum was founded in 1818 and has one of the largest collections of plaster casts of ancient Greek and Roman sculptures in the world. At this time collections of plaster casts were mainly used in the instruction of students at art academies. They were first used in the instruction of university students in 1763 by Christian Gottlob Heyne at University of Göttingen. The Akademisches Kunstmuseum in Bonn was the first of its kind, as at this time collections at other universities were scattered around universities libraries. The first director was Friedrich Gottlieb Welcker, who also held a professorship of archaeology. His tenure was from 1819 until his retirement in 1854. He was succeeded by Otto Jahn and Friedrich Wilhelm Ritschl, who shared the directorship. From 1870 to 1889 Reinhard Kekulé von Stradonitz, nephew of the famous organic chemist Friedrich August Kekulé von Stradonitz, was the director. In 1872 the museum moved to a new building that was formerly used by the department of anatomy. The building was constructed from 1823 to 1830 and designed by Karl Friedrich Schinkel and Hermann Friedrich Waesemann. Other directors of the museum were Georg Loeschcke (from 1889 to 1912), Franz Winter (from 1912 to 1929), Richard Delbrueck (from 1929 to 1940), Ernst Langlotz (from 1944 to 1966), Nikolaus Himmelmann (from 1969 to 1994) and Harald Mielsch (since 1994). All directors, with the exception of Friedrich Wilhelm Ritschl held a professorship of archaeology at the university.
