= Fulgencio Argüelles =

Spanish writer and psychologist (born 1955)

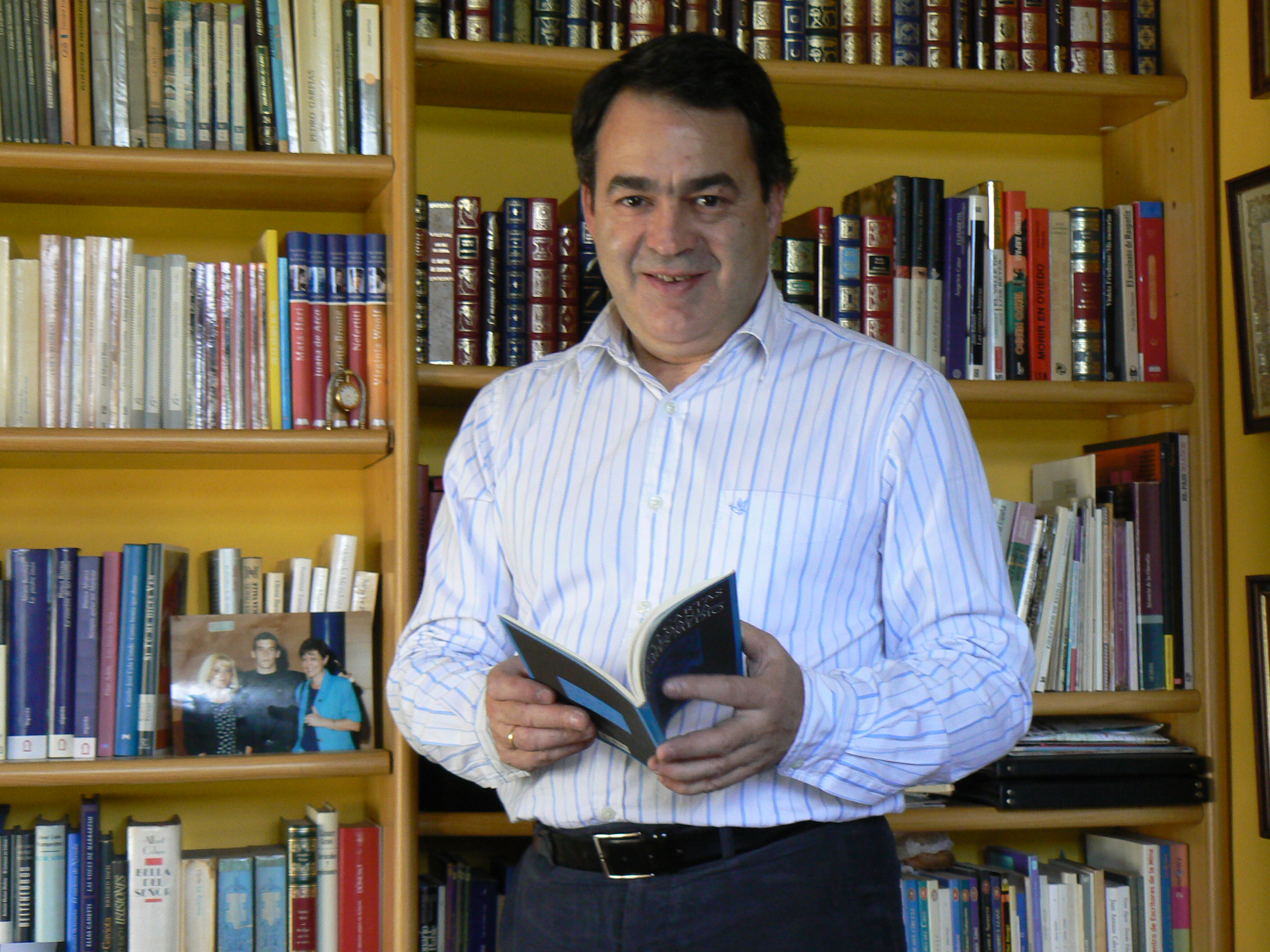
- Born: January 6, 1955 (age 71); Orillés, Aller, Asturias, Spain
- Occupations: Writer, psychologist
- Writing career
- Language: Spanish, Asturian
- Genres: Novels, short stories
- Notable awards: Premio Azorín (1992); Premio Principado de Asturias (2000); Premio Café Gijón (2003)

Fulgencio Argüelles (born January 6, 1955), is a Spanish writer and psychologist.

== Life ==
Born in 1955 in the Orillés neighborhood of Aller, Asturias, Argüelles studied psychology at the Comillas Pontifical University and the Complutense University of Madrid, specializing in sociology of work and organizations. After a long residence in Madrid, he returned in 1997 to Asturias to live in the village of Cenera (Mieres), where he had lived as a child. He now is now a Socialist representative on the city council (ayuntamiento) of Mieres.

He wrote prize-winning short stories in both Spanish and Asturian before publishing his first novel. His novels include Letanías de lluvia, winner of the Premio Azorín, 1992; Los clamores de la tierra; Recuerdos de algún vivir, winner of the Premio Principado de Asturias, 2000, granted by the Fundación Dolores Medio; and El Palacio de los ingenieros belgas, winner of the Premio Café Gijón 2003. He has also published two books of short stories, Del color de la nada and Seronda, the latter written in Asturian and in collaboration with the Asturian painter J. Enrique Maojo.

== Works ==
=== Novels ===
- Letanías de lluvia (Alfaguara, 1993), winner of the Premio Azorín de Novela, 1992.
- Los clamores de la tierra (Alfaguara, 1996), an historical fiction set in the first years of the reign of Ramiro I of Asturias (reigned 843–850).
- Recuerdos de algún vivir (Nobel, 2000), winner of the Premio de Novela Principado de Asturias 2000.
- El palacio azul de los ingenieros belgas (Acantilado, 2003), winner of the Premio Café Gijón de Novela, 2003.
- A la sombra de los abedules (TREA, 2011)

=== Books of short stories ===
- Del color de la nada
- Seronda (Academia de la Llingua Asturiana, 2004): stories in Asturian, illustrated by Jorge Enrique Maojo.

=== Other ===
- Argüelles' story Cuando los balones se volvieron invisibles is the first work of forty in the anthology Cuentos de fútbol (Alfaguara, 1995).
