= Atthis (Philochorus) =

The Atthis (Greek: Ἀτθίς, another name for Attica) of Philochorus was a local history of Attica and Athens. The full text of the Atthis, which extended to 17 books, has been lost, but the surviving fragments (mostly from the first seven books) give a good idea of its format. Philochorus covered the whole of Athenian history, from the earliest legendary times down to the capture of Athens by the Macedonians in 261 BC, which happened shortly before his death. The large number of references to it by other ancient writers shows how influential the work was.
