= Alcamenes =

5th-century BC Greek sculptor

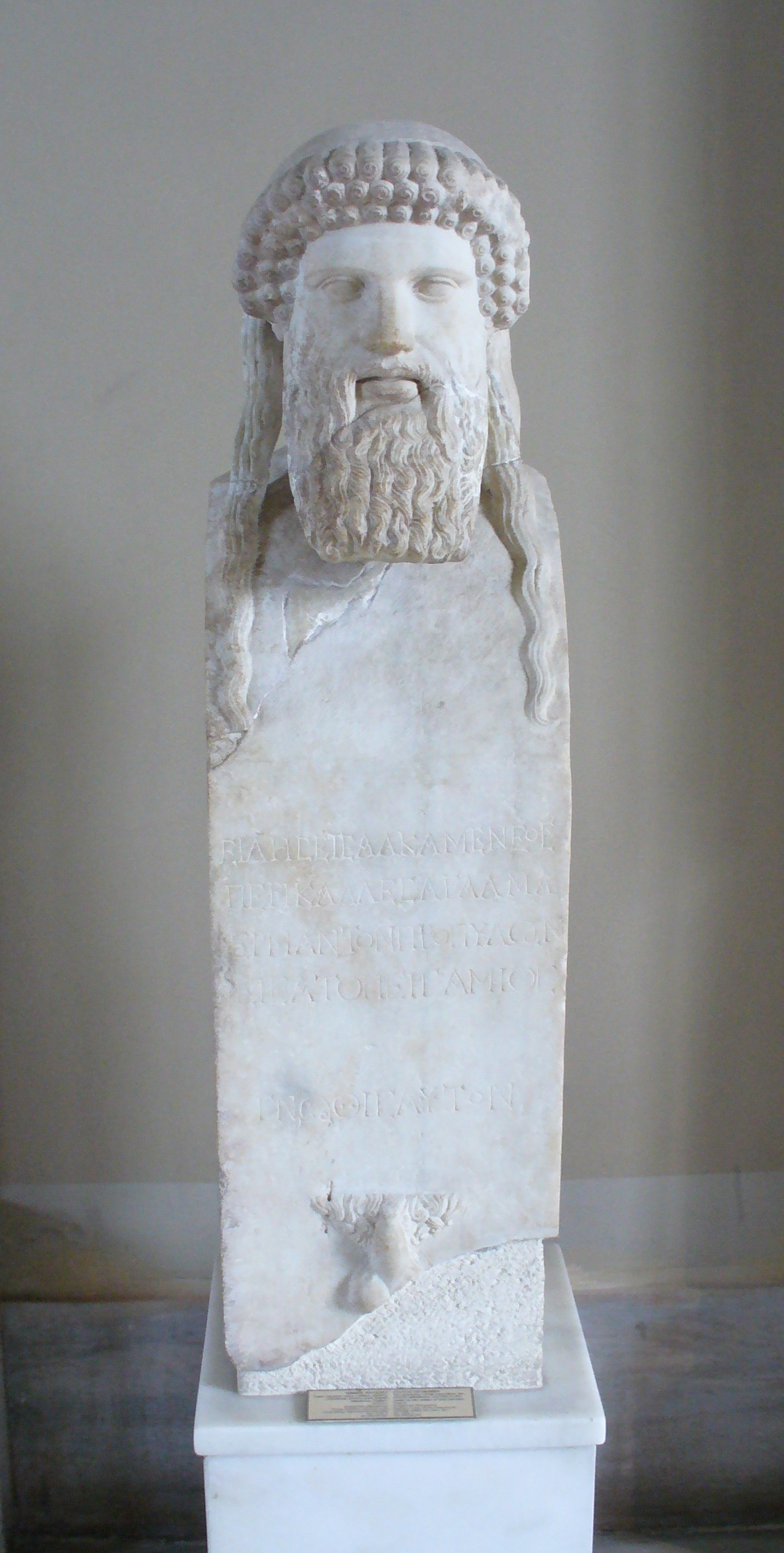
Herm of Hermes, Roman copy of a late 5th century BC original, the forefront inscription states the herm was made by Alcamenes and dedicated by Pergamios, Istanbul Museums.

Alcamenes (Ancient Greek: Ἀλκαμένης) was an ancient Greek sculptor of Lemnos and Athens, who flourished in the 2nd half of the 5th century BC. He was a younger contemporary of Phidias and noted for the delicacy and finish of his works, among which a Hephaestus and an Aphrodite of the Gardens were conspicuous.

Pausanias says that he was the author of one of the pediments of the temple of Zeus at Olympia, but this seems a chronological and stylistic impossibility. Pausanias also refers to a statue of Ares by Alcamenes that was erected on the Athenian agora, which some have related to the Ares Borghese. However, the temple of Ares to which he refers had only been moved from Acharnes and re-sited in the Agora in Augustus's time, and statues known to derive from Alcamenes' statue show the god in a breastplate, so the identification of Alcamenes' Ares with the Ares Borghese is not secure.

At Pergamum there was discovered in 1903 a Hellenistic copy of the head of the Hermes "Propylaeus" of Alcamenes. As, however, the deity is represented in a Neo-Attic, archaistic and conventional character, this copy cannot be relied on as giving us much information as to the usual style of Alcamenes, who was almost certainly a progressive and original artist.

It is safer to judge him by the sculptural decoration of the Parthenon, in which he must almost certainly have taken a share under the direction of Phidias. He is said to be the most eminent sculptor in Athens after the departure of Phidias for Olympia, but enigmatic in that none of the sculptures associated with his name in classical literature can be securely connected with existing copies.
