= Philochorus =

Greek historian (c. 340 BC – c. 261 BC)

Philochorus of Athens (/fɪˈlɒkərəs/; Ancient Greek: Φιλόχορος, romanized: Philochoros; c. 340 BC – c. 261 BC), was a Greek historian and Atthidographer of the third century BC, and a member of a priestly family. He was a seer and interpreter of signs, and a man of considerable influence.

== Biography ==
Philochorus was strongly anti-Macedonian in politics, and a bitter opponent of Demetrius Poliorcetes. When Antigonus Gonatas, the son of the latter, besieged and captured Athens (261 BC), Philochorus was put to death for having supported Ptolemy II Philadelphus of Egypt, who had encouraged the Athenians in their resistance to Macedonia.

His investigations into the usages and customs of his native Attica were embodied in an Atthis, in seventeen books, a history of Athens from the earliest times to 262 BC. Considerable fragments are preserved in the lexicographers, scholiasts, Athenaeus, and elsewhere. The work was epitomized by the author himself, and later by Asinius Pollio of Tralles (perhaps a freedman of the famous Gaius Asinius Pollio).

Philochorus also wrote on oracles, divination and sacrifices; the mythology and religious observances of the tetrapolis of Attica; the myths of Sophocles; the lives of Euripides and Pythagoras; the foundation of Salamis, Cyprus. He compiled chronological lists of the archons and Olympiads, and made a collection of Attic inscriptions, the first of its kind in Greece.

== Critique of his work ==
Philochorus was a conscientious and meticulous writer, who placed great importance on chronologies, and his style was clear and succinct. His works were highly valued throughout antiquity and are frequently referenced by later historians, lexicographers, and commentators, including Plutarch, Athenaeus, Strabo, Dionysius of Halicarnassus, Clement of Alexandria, Diogenes Laertius, Harpocration, Stephanus of Byzantium, Zenobius, Hesychius, Eusebius, the Lexicon of Photius, the Great Etymological Dictionary, John Malalas, Tertullian, and the Latin mythographer Fulgentius, among others.

Over two hundred fragments have survived, most of them from his work Atthis.
