= Marco Bülow =

German politician (1971–2026)

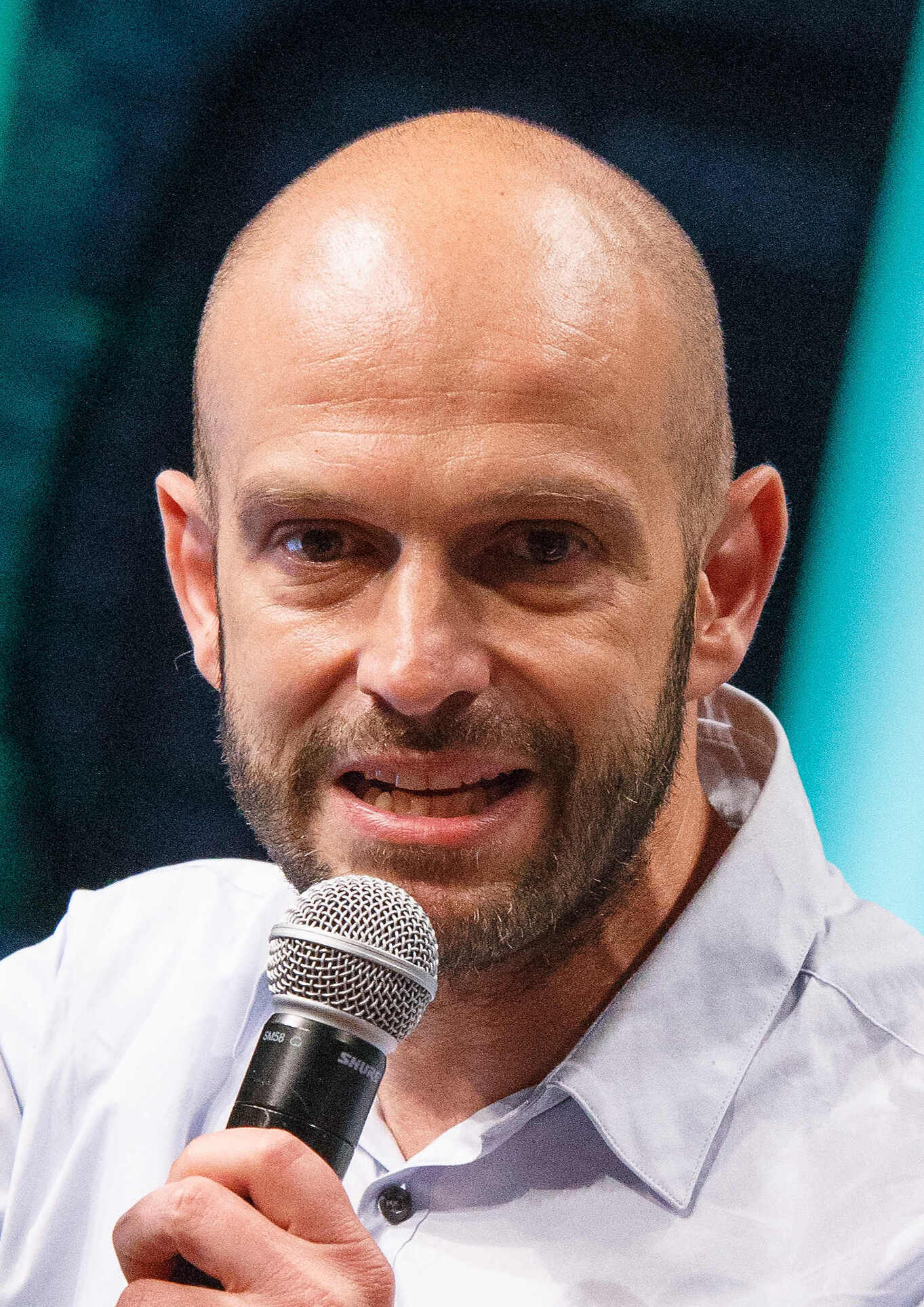
- Bülow in 2018

Member of the Bundestag for Dortmund I
- In office 17 October 2002 – 26 September 2021
- Preceded by: Hans-Eberhard Urbaniak
- Succeeded by: Jens Peick

Personal details
- Born: Marco Bülow; 14 June 1971 Dortmund, North Rhine-Westphalia, West Germany
- Died: January 2026 (aged 54)
- Citizenship: Germany
- Party: Die PARTEI (2020–2025); SPD (1992–2018)
- Children: 1
- Education: TU Dortmund University (no degree)
- Occupation: Politician; author
- Website: www.marco-buelow.de

Marco Bülow (14 June 1971 – January 2026) was a German journalist and politician who served as a member of the Bundestag for Dortmund I from 2002 to 2021. From 2020, he was a member of Die PARTEI. He was a member of the SPD between 1992 and 2018.

== Early life and education ==
Marco Bülow was born in Dortmund, North Rhine-Westphalia, West Germany on 14 June 1971. After graduating from the Anne-Frank-Gesamtschule in Dortmund, Bülow studied history, journalism and political science at the Technical University of Dortmund.

== Political career ==
Bülow was a member of the German Bundestag beginning with the 2002 federal elections, representing Dortmund I. He left the SPD in November 2018 and joined the party Die PARTEI in November 2020, as their first ever member in the Bundestag.

== Death ==
It was announced on 29 January 2026 that Bülow, after a prolonged serious illness, had died at the age of 54.

== Bibliography ==
- Generation Zukunft : ein Plädoyer für verantwortungsbewusstes Handeln (in German). Riemann. 2004. ISBN 978-3-570-50058-3.
- Wir Abnicker : über Macht und Ohnmacht der Volksvertreter (in German). Econ. 2010. ISBN 978-3-430-30042-1.
- Lobbyland : Wie die Wirtschaft unsere Demokratie kauft (in German). Das Neue Berlin. 2021. ISBN 978-3-360-50173-8.
- Den Krieg verlernen : Zum Vermächtnis einer Pazifistin (in German). VSA. 2024. ISBN 978-3-96488-211-0.
