= Jeremy Fragrance =

German influencer (born 1989)

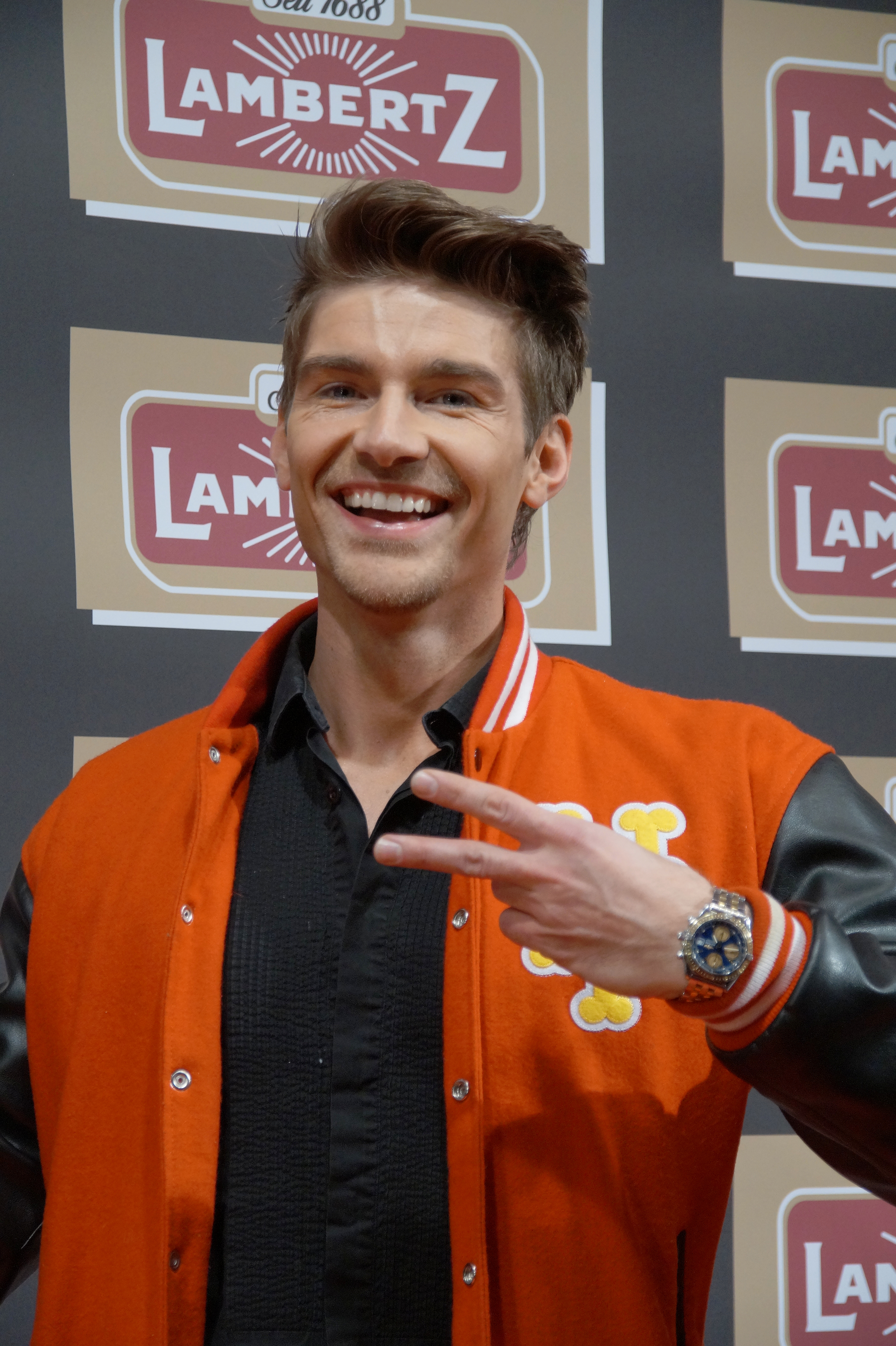
- Schütz in 2016
- Born: Daniel Średziński; February 5, 1989 (age 37); Oldenburg, West Germany
- Other names: Jeremy Williams, Daniel Schütz
- Occupations: Social media personality; influencer
- Website: jeremyfragrance.com

Daniel Schütz (born Daniel Średziński February 5, 1989), better known as Jeremy Fragrance, is a Polish-German social media personality and businessman. He gained international recognition through dancing on TikTok and numerous online video clips in which he reviews, among other things, perfumes and fragrances.

== Early life and education ==
Daniel Średziński was born to Polish immigrants in Oldenburg and lived for a short period of time in the Holzlar district of Bonn. He changed his surname to Schütz sometime later in his life after his mother remarried. He became interested in dance through school theater and subsequently started a part-time job at the Oldenburg State Theater and produced private dance tutorials from 2007. Schütz used the stage name Jeremy Williams from 2008 to 2010 and was a member of the unsuccessful casting band Part Six. After that, he briefly joined the music project Golden Circle and released a solo music piece called "All of Me" in 2011. He then began studying industrial engineering while also modeling on the side. According to Schütz, his interest in perfumes began at the age after he encountered the distinctive scent of an Abercrombie & Fitch store in Hawaii.The experience prompted him to start researching fragrances and watching online perfume reviews, which he later identified as an important influence on his decision to create fragrance-related content.

== Career ==
Starting in 2014, Schütz focused on presenting fragrances on the online video platform YouTube. He operates bilingually, having both a German and a much more successful English-language channel, while occasionally making videos in Polish. One of his first videos achieved over two million views. In 2022, his primary focus of social media activity was on TikTok, where he had six million followers.

In 2018, his video titled 5 Reasons to Wear Fragrances received the FiFi Award for the best perfume vlog from The Fragrance Foundation at an award ceremony in New York.

Through a Kickstarter campaign with the goal of raising 25,000 euros to create his own fragrance, Schütz generated almost 800,000 euros and subsequently offered his own perfume collection in an online shop starting in 2018. In 2022, the "self-proclaimed millionaire" stated that he earned "tens of thousands of euros" with every published video. He mentioned that his largest revenue no longer came from advertising contracts but from his own fragrances.

In early November 2021, Schütz was invited by Pakistani Prime Minister Imran Khan to a public relations event along with actors from the Turkish TV series Diriliş Ertuğrul. Furthermore, according to his own statements, Schütz maintains contacts with the ruling family of the United Arab Emirates.

Schütz has made repeated appearances on television and internet shows, including Late Night Berlin (ProSieben), the YouTube channel of Leeroy Matata, and World Wide Wohnzimmer (Funk). Starting in mid-November 2022, Schütz participated in the tenth season of the reality show Promi Big Brother. After voluntarily leaving on the 6th day, he was accompanied by a camera crew, and the documentary Jeremy Fragrance – Number One: From Promi-Big-Brother Back into the World aired on Sat.1 in early December 2022.

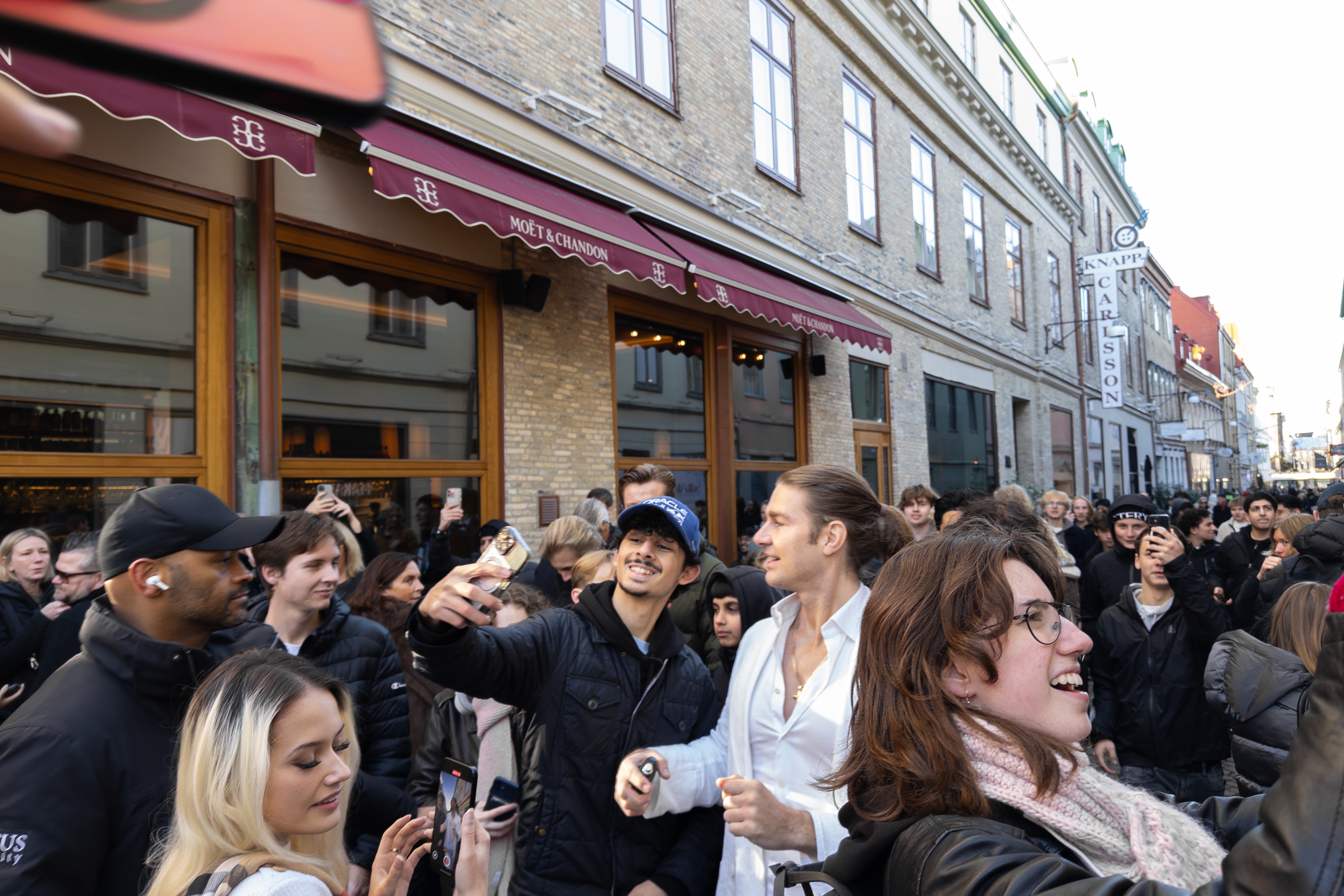
Jeremy Fragrance meets fans in Sweden.

== Reception ==
Schütz strongly advocates self-improvement, emphasizing optimism and the importance of a high self-esteem. The Redaktionsnetzwerk Deutschland described his actions as "so absurd and bizarre that [he] has become a living meme." He also frequently talks about his eating habits and daily routines that are meant to promote health.

Schütz denies speculations that his behavior can be explained by drug abuse. He says that his "cocaine-style" is deliberate to generate attention and clicks. In a talk show called deep und deutlich produced by NDR Fernsehen, he stated in 2021: "I support my entire family by fooling around like an idiot. It's just that I make a lot of money with it." At his appearance at the OMR 2023 online conference, Schütz also mentioned, "I have never taken drugs in my life - I don't even drink alcohol [...]. I have a pretty intense mindset, and I'm ethically very cool."
