= Markus Kurth =

Markus Kurth may refer to:

- Markus Kurth (footballer) (born 1973), German football manager and footballer
- Markus Kurth (politician) (born 1966), German politician
