= Dortmund I =

Electoral constituency represented in the Bundestag

141 Dortmund I
- Electoral district for the Bundestag
- Dortmund I in 2025
- State: North Rhine-Westphalia
- Population: 283,400 (2019)
- Electorate: 206,727 (2021)
- Major settlements: Dortmund (partial)
- Area: 126.3 km^{2}

Current electoral district
- Created: 1949
- Party: SPD
- Member: Jens Peick
- Elected: 2021, 2025

Dortmund I is an electoral constituency (German: Wahlkreis) represented in the Bundestag. It elects one member via first-past-the-post voting. Under the current constituency numbering system, it is designated as constituency 141. It is located in the Ruhr region of North Rhine-Westphalia, comprising the western part of the city of Dortmund.

Dortmund I was created for the inaugural 1949 federal election. Since 2021, it has been represented by Jens Peick of the Social Democratic Party (SPD).

== Geography ==
Dortmund I is located in the Ruhr region of North Rhine-Westphalia. As of the 2021 federal election, it comprises the Stadtbezirke of 6 Hombruch, 8 Huckarde, 7 Lütgendortmund, 9 Mengede, and the Stadtteile of Innenstadt-West and Innenstadt-Ost from 0 Innenstadt.

== History ==
Dortmund I was created in 1949. In the 1949 election, it was North Rhine-Westphalia constituency 56 in the numbering system. From 1953 through 1961, it was number 115. From 1965 through 1976, it was number 114. From 1980 through 1998, it was number 113. From 2002 through 2009, it was number 143. In the 2013 through 2021 elections, it was number 142. From the 2025 election, it has been number 141.

Originally, the constituency comprised the northwestern part of the independent city of Dortmund. From 1980 through 1998, it comprised the Stadtbezirk of 8 Huckarde as well as the Stadtteile of Innenstadt-Ost and Innenstadt-West from 0 Innenstadt. It acquired its current borders in the 2002 election.

Election	No.	Name	Borders
1949	56	Dortmund I	Dortmund city (only northwestern parts)
1953	115	Dortmund I	Dortmund city (only northwestern parts)
1957	115	Dortmund I	Dortmund city (only northwestern parts)
1961	115	Dortmund I	Dortmund city (only northwestern parts)
1965	114	Dortmund I	Dortmund city (only northwestern parts)
1969	114	Dortmund I	Dortmund city (only northwestern parts)
1972	114	Dortmund I	Dortmund city (only northwestern parts)
1976	114	Dortmund I	Dortmund city (only northwestern parts)
1980	113	Dortmund I	Dortmund city (only 0 Innenstadt (only Innenstadt-Ost and Innenstadt-West Stadtteile) and 8 Huckarde Stadtbezirke)
1983	113	Dortmund I	Dortmund city (only 0 Innenstadt (only Innenstadt-Ost and Innenstadt-West Stadtteile) and 8 Huckarde Stadtbezirke)
1987	113	Dortmund I	Dortmund city (only 0 Innenstadt (only Innenstadt-Ost and Innenstadt-West Stadtteile) and 8 Huckarde Stadtbezirke)
1990	113	Dortmund I	Dortmund city (only 0 Innenstadt (only Innenstadt-Ost and Innenstadt-West Stadtteile) and 8 Huckarde Stadtbezirke)
1994	113	Dortmund I	Dortmund city (only 0 Innenstadt (only Innenstadt-Ost and Innenstadt-West Stadtteile) and 8 Huckarde Stadtbezirke)
1998	113	Dortmund I	Dortmund city (only 0 Innenstadt (only Innenstadt-Ost and Innenstadt-West Stadtteile) and 8 Huckarde Stadtbezirke)
2002	143	Dortmund I	Dortmund city (only 0 Innenstadt (only Innenstadt-Ost and Innenstadt-West Stadtteile), 6 Hombruch, 8 Huckarde, 7 Lütgendortmund, and 9 Mengede Stadtbezirke)
2005	143	Dortmund I	Dortmund city (only 0 Innenstadt (only Innenstadt-Ost and Innenstadt-West Stadtteile), 6 Hombruch, 8 Huckarde, 7 Lütgendortmund, and 9 Mengede Stadtbezirke)
2009	143	Dortmund I	Dortmund city (only 0 Innenstadt (only Innenstadt-Ost and Innenstadt-West Stadtteile), 6 Hombruch, 8 Huckarde, 7 Lütgendortmund, and 9 Mengede Stadtbezirke)
2013	142	Dortmund I	Dortmund city (only 0 Innenstadt (only Innenstadt-Ost and Innenstadt-West Stadtteile), 6 Hombruch, 8 Huckarde, 7 Lütgendortmund, and 9 Mengede Stadtbezirke)
2017	142	Dortmund I	Dortmund city (only 0 Innenstadt (only Innenstadt-Ost and Innenstadt-West Stadtteile), 6 Hombruch, 8 Huckarde, 7 Lütgendortmund, and 9 Mengede Stadtbezirke)
2021	142	Dortmund I	Dortmund city (only 0 Innenstadt (only Innenstadt-Ost and Innenstadt-West Stadtteile), 6 Hombruch, 8 Huckarde, 7 Lütgendortmund, and 9 Mengede Stadtbezirke)
2025	141	Dortmund I	Dortmund city (only 0 Innenstadt (only Innenstadt-Ost and Innenstadt-West Stadtteile), 6 Hombruch, 8 Huckarde, 7 Lütgendortmund, and 9 Mengede Stadtbezirke)

== Members ==
The constituency has been held continuously by the Social Democratic Party (SPD) since its creation. It was first represented by Fritz Henßler from 1949 to 1953, when he was succeeded by Walter Menzel until 1961. Werner Zeitler then served two terms. Hans-Eberhard Urbaniak was elected in 1980 and was representative until 2002. Marco Bülow was elected in 2002, and re-elected in 2005, 2009, 2013, and 2017. Bülow left the SPD in November 2018 and served as an independent; in November 2020, he joined Die PARTEI, becoming its first member of the Bundestag. Jens Peick regained the constituency for the SPD in 2021 and was re-elected in 2025.

Election	Member	Party	%
1949	Fritz Henßler	SPD	43.4
1953	Walter Menzel	SPD	44.2
1957	Walter Menzel	SPD	46.3
1961	Heinrich Stephan	SPD	47.5
1965	Heinrich Stephan	SPD	53.0
1969	Karl Schiller	SPD	60.2
1972	Werner Zeitler	SPD	60.2
1976	Werner Zeitler	SPD	55.4
1980	Hans-Eberhard Urbaniak	SPD	57.3
1983	Hans-Eberhard Urbaniak	SPD	54.9
1987	Hans-Eberhard Urbaniak	SPD	53.6
1990	Hans-Eberhard Urbaniak	SPD	51.3
1994	Hans-Eberhard Urbaniak	SPD	53.5
1998	Hans-Eberhard Urbaniak	SPD	56.5
2002	Marco Bülow (Note: Bülow was elected for the SPD, but left the party in November 2018. He joined Die PARTEI in November 2020.)	SPD	57.8
2005	Marco Bülow	SPD	56.3
2009	Marco Bülow	SPD	41.2
2013	Marco Bülow	SPD	45.4
2017	Marco Bülow	SPD	38.8
2017	Marco Bülow	Ind.	38.8
2017	Marco Bülow	PARTEI	38.8
2021	Jens Peick	SPD	33.0
2025	Jens Peick	SPD	30.6

== Election results ==
=== 2025 election ===
Federal election (2025): Dortmund I
Notes:	Blue background denotes the winner of the electorate vote. Pink background denotes a candidate elected from their party list. Yellow background denotes an electorate win by a list member, or other incumbent. A ✓ or ✗ denotes status of any incumbent, win or lose respectively.						
Party	Candidate	Votes	%	±%	Party votes	%	±%
SPD	Jens Peick	50,260	30.6	▼2.4	37,861	23.0	▼9.3
CDU	Sarah Beckhoff	38,929	23.7	▲4.3	36,346	22.1	▲4.1
AfD	Heinrich Garbe	26,058	15.9	▲9.0	25,853	15.7	▲8.8
Greens	Martina Wilken	22,994	14.0	▼3.0	25,180	15.3	▼5.3
Left	Jan Siebert	15,047	9.2	▲5.4	19,459	11.8	▲6.9
BSW					7,075	4.3	
FDP	Levin Rybak	4,857	3.0	▼3.8	5,913	3.6	▼5.8
PARTEI	✗ Olaf Schlösser	3,053	1.9	▼6.8	1,376	0.8	▼1.4
Tierschutzpartei				▼2.0	2,425	1.5	▼0.2
Volt	Peter Quiring	1,889	1.2	▲0.7	1,135	0.7	▲0.3
Independent	Ingo Meyer	599	0.4				
FW				▼0.6	476	0.3	▼0.2
MLPD	Sarah-Ines Rißmann	401	0.2	▲0.1	122	0.1	0.0
Team Todenhöfer					346	0.2	▼0.7
dieBasis				▼0.8	292	0.2	▼0.6
PdF					258	0.2	▲0.1
BD					199	0.1	
MERA25					92		
Values					87	0.1	
Pirates							▼0.4
Gesundheitsforschung							▼0.1
Humanists							▼0.1
ÖDP							▼0.1
Bündnis C							0.0
SGP							0.0
Informal votes		1,351			943		
Total valid votes		164,087			164,495		
Turnout		165,438	81.2	▲5.9			
SPD hold	Majority	11,331	6.9				

=== 2021 election ===
Federal election (2021): Dortmund I
Notes:	Blue background denotes the winner of the electorate vote. Pink background denotes a candidate elected from their party list. Yellow background denotes an electorate win by a list member, or other incumbent. A ✓ or ✗ denotes status of any incumbent, win or lose respectively.						
Party	Candidate	Votes	%	±%	Party votes	%	±%
SPD	Jens Peick	51,037	33.0	▼5.8	50,117	32.4	▲2.4
CDU	Klaus Wegener	30,051	19.4	▼9.2	27,797	17.9	▼6.6
Greens	Markus Kurth	26,308	17.0	▲9.7	31,867	20.6	▲11.1
PARTEI	✗ Marco Bülow	13,361	8.6		3,451	2.2	▲0.8
AfD	Heinrich Garbe	10,577	6.8	▼2.6	10,746	6.9	▼2.9
FDP	Roman Senga	10,416	6.7	▲0.9	14,550	9.4	▼1.7
Left	Ann-Christin Huber	5,908	3.8	▼3.9	7,566	4.9	▼5.1
Tierschutzpartei	Michael Badura	3,097	2.0		2,661	1.7	▲0.9
Team Todenhöfer					1,445	0.9	
dieBasis	Achim Lohse	1,226	0.8		1,206	0.8	
FW	Mario Krause	935	0.6	0.0	758	0.5	▲0.2
Pirates					680	0.4	▼0.2
Volt	Daniel Staiger	660	0.4		557	0.4	
Independent	Noah Trojanowski	621	0.4				
Independent	Paul Hofmann	255	0.2				
NPD					254	0.2	▼0.1
Gesundheitsforschung					180	0.1	0.0
LIEBE					174	0.1	
Humanists					144	0.1	0.0
ÖDP					111	0.1	0.0
LfK					108	0.1	
V-Partei3					97	0.1	▼0.1
MLPD	Sarah Rißmann	151	0.1	▼0.1	84	0.1	▼0.1
du.					76	0.0	
DKP	Hanfried Brenner	113	0.1		74	0.0	0.0
Bündnis C					57	0.0	
LKR					40	0.0	
PdF					38	0.0	
SGP					36	0.0	0.0
Informal votes		1,098			940		
Total valid votes		154,716			154,874		
Turnout		155,814	75.4	▲1.5			
SPD hold	Majority	20,986	13.6	▲3.4			

=== 2017 election ===
Federal election (2017): Dortmund I
Notes:	Blue background denotes the winner of the electorate vote. Pink background denotes a candidate elected from their party list. Yellow background denotes an electorate win by a list member, or other incumbent. A ✓ or ✗ denotes status of any incumbent, win or lose respectively.						
Party	Candidate	Votes	%	±%	Party votes	%	±%
SPD	✓ Marco Bülow	59,990	38.8	▼6.6	46,424	30.0	▼8.1
CDU	Thorsten Hoffmann	44,228	28.6	▼2.1	37,967	24.5	▼4.5
AfD	Heinrich Theodor Garbe	14,644	9.5	▲6.0	15,197	9.8	▲5.7
Left	Ulla Jelpke	11,874	7.7	▲1.7	15,506	10.0	▲2.1
Greens	Markus Kurth	11,281	7.3	▼0.2	14,702	9.5	▼1.2
FDP	Max Zombek	9,063	5.9	▲3.9	17,193	11.1	▲7.0
PARTEI					2,137	1.4	▲0.9
Tierschutzpartei					1,304	0.8	
Pirates	Torsten Sommer	2,091	1.4	▼1.2	1,041	0.7	▼2.1
AD-DEMOKRATEN					838	0.5	
NPD					456	0.3	▼1.0
FW	Hartmut Kaltenbach	993	0.6	▲0.2	437	0.3	0.0
DiB					266	0.2	
BGE					229	0.1	
V-Partei³					228	0.1	
MLPD	Sarah-Ines Rißmann	362	0.2	▲0.1	176	0.1	0.0
Gesundheitsforschung					163	0.1	
ÖDP					162	0.1	0.0
Volksabstimmung					156	0.1	▼0.1
DM					149	0.1	
Die Humanisten					120	0.1	
DKP					52	0.0	
SGP					20	0.0	0.0
Informal votes		1,571			1,174		
Total valid votes		154,526			154,923		
Turnout		156,097	73.9	▲4.2			
SPD hold	Majority	15,762	10.2	▼4.5			

=== 2013 election ===
Federal election (2013): Dortmund I
Notes:	Blue background denotes the winner of the electorate vote. Pink background denotes a candidate elected from their party list. Yellow background denotes an electorate win by a list member, or other incumbent. A ✓ or ✗ denotes status of any incumbent, win or lose respectively.						
Party	Candidate	Votes	%	±%	Party votes	%	±%
SPD	✓ Marco Bülow	67,019	45.4	▲4.3	56,180	38.1	▲5.1
CDU	Thorsten Hoffmann (Note: Hoffmann entered the Bundestag on the CDU list after the resignation of Ronald Pofalla in January 2015.)	45,310	30.7	▲3.2	42,712	29.0	▲4.5
Greens	Markus Kurth	11,042	7.5	▼3.4	15,827	10.7	▼2.9
Left	Ulla Jelpke	8,835	6.0	▼3.7	11,653	7.9	▼3.1
AfD	Alexander Dilger	5,188	3.5		6,060	4.1	
Pirates	Dieter McDevitt	3,775	2.6		4,078	2.8	▲0.5
FDP	Michael Kauch	2,882	2.0	▼6.8	6,107	4.1	▼7.9
NPD	Siegfried Schwerdtfeger	2,139	1.5	▼0.1	1,894	1.3	▲0.3
PARTEI					731	0.5	
FW	Markus Happe	634	0.4		437	0.3	
Volksabstimmung					304	0.2	▲0.1
PRO					243	0.2	
ÖDP					172	0.1	0.0
Nichtwahler					161	0.1	
BIG					158	0.1	
REP					157	0.1	0.0
MLPD	Gerhard Pfisterer	254	0.2	0.0	154	0.1	0.0
RRP	Dagmar Anita Ludwig	203	0.1		136	0.1	0.0
Independent	Ingo Meyer	188	0.1				
Party of Reason					137	0.1	
Die Rechte					125	0.1	
PSG					32	0.0	0.0
BüSo					27	0.0	▼0.1
Informal votes		1,562			1,546		
Total valid votes		147,469			147,485		
Turnout		149,031	69.7	▼0.1			
SPD hold	Majority	21,709	14.7	▲1.0			

=== 2009 election ===
Federal election (2009): Dortmund I
Notes:	Blue background denotes the winner of the electorate vote. Pink background denotes a candidate elected from their party list. Yellow background denotes an electorate win by a list member, or other incumbent. A ✓ or ✗ denotes status of any incumbent, win or lose respectively.						
Party	Candidate	Votes	%	±%	Party votes	%	±%
SPD	✓ Marco Bülow	60,839	41.2	▼15.1	48,882	33.0	▼15.2
CDU	Steffen Kanitz	40,623	27.5	▼1.8	36,237	24.5	▼0.5
Greens	Markus Kurth	16,141	10.9	▲5.8	20,133	13.6	▲3.3
Left	Helmut Eigen	14,273	9.7	▲4.8	16,272	11.0	▲4.7
FDP	Michael Kauch	12,890	8.7	▲5.7	17,813	12.0	▲4.3
Pirates					3,311	2.2	
NPD	Axel Thieme	2,281	1.5	▲0.6	1,469	1.0	▲0.2
Tierschutzpartei					960	0.6	▲0.3
DVU					838	0.6	
RENTNER					638	0.4	
FAMILIE					521	0.4	▲0.1
REP					231	0.2	▼0.1
RRP					201	0.1	
BüSo	Tobias Christoph Mzingisi Faku	440	0.3		103	0.1	0.0
MLPD	Gerhard Pfisterer	288	0.2	0.0	146	0.1	0.0
Volksabstimmung					128	0.1	0.0
ÖDP					105	0.1	
Centre					63	0.0	0.0
PSG					22	0.0	0.0
Informal votes		1,556			1,258		
Total valid votes		147,775			148,073		
Turnout		149,331	69.7	▼6.3			
SPD hold	Majority	20,216	13.7	▼13.3			

=== 2005 election ===
Federal election (2005): Dortmund I
Notes:	Blue background denotes the winner of the electorate vote. Pink background denotes a candidate elected from their party list. Yellow background denotes an electorate win by a list member, or other incumbent. A ✓ or ✗ denotes status of any incumbent, win or lose respectively.						
Party	Candidate	Votes	%	±%	Party votes	%	±%
SPD	✓ Marco Bülow	88,227	56.3	▼1.5	75,717	48.2	▼3.5
CDU	Matthias Ulrich	45,968	29.3	▲2.0	39,208	25.0	▼0.1
Greens	Markus Kurth	8,020	5.1	▼9.3	16,084	10.2	▼1.2
Left	Karl Krämer	7,616	4.9	▲3.0	9,929	6.3	▲4.5
FDP	Michael Kauch	4,728	3.0	▼2.1	12,169	7.8	▲0.3
NPD	Matthias Wächter	1,520	1.0		1,275	0.8	▲0.5
Tierschutzpartei					587	0.4	
GRAUEN					543	0.3	▲0.1
REP					445	0.3	▼0.1
Familie					379	0.2	▲0.1
MLPD	Gerhard Pfisterer	335	0.2		233	0.1	
Independent	Detlef Münch	312	0.2				
From Now on... Democracy Through Referendum					99	0.1	
PBC					98	0.1	
Socialist Equality Party					83	0.1	
BüSo					59	0.0	
Centre					52	0.0	
Informal votes		6,744			6,511		
Total valid votes		156,726			156,959		
Turnout		163,470	76.0	▼3.3			
SPD hold	Majority	42,259	27.0				
