= Paul Langen =

German resistance member (1893–1945)

- Born: 12 January 1893; Nippes, Cologne, German Empire
- Died: 16 March 1945 (aged 52); Siegburg, Siegkreis, Nazi Germany
- Monuments: Stolperstein near the Holzlar primary school; street named in his honour
- Education: University of Bonn, University of Frankfurt
- Occupation: Headmaster
- Known for: Opposing Nazi propaganda
- Criminal charge: Wehrkraftzersetzung ("subversion of the war effort")
- Criminal status: Posthumously acquitted
- Spouse(s): Clara Langen, née Müller (1922–1942, her death)
- Children: One son, two daughters

Paul Langen (12 January 1893 – 16 March 1945) was a German teacher who opposed the national socialist regime and spoke out against Nazi propaganda and the continuation of World War II. He was arrested by the Gestapo and convicted of Wehrkraftzersetzung ("subversion of the war effort") in 1943. He died in prison from typhus.

== Childhood and early life ==
Paul Langen was born on 12 January 1893 in Nippes, Cologne, the son of a machinist and the youngest of five children. His teachers described him as a "good but difficult" pupil who "refused to subordinate himself". After graduating from the Realgymnasium with the Abitur in 1913, he attended a business school and studied political science and economics (Staatswissenschaften) at the universities of Bonn and Cologne until 1914.

At the breakout of World War I in August 1914, Langen joined the army as a pioneer. In 1918 he was released from service after "incapacitation due to typhoid fever and malaria".

After the war, he studied philosophy and history at the universities of Bonn and Frankfurt. He also attended a teachers' college in Wipperfürth. When he was offered a position as a teacher in Hetzenholz near Much in 1920, he withdrew from university studies. In 1922 he married Clara Müller, a woman from Siegburg, with whom he had three children. In 1923 he completed his formal education as a teacher with the 2nd Teacher's Exam.

Langen's experiences during World War I affected his mental well-being. After becoming the headmaster of a Hauptschule (general school) near Gummersbach in 1928, he engaged in a bureaucratic struggle with the school authorities regarding a disagreement over the adjustment of his salary depending on the duration of his war service. In 1931, the local schools inspector decided to relocate him to another school due to neurasthenia. Langen chose to be relocated to the primary school in Holzlar because of the village's location near Bonn and the river Rhine. In 1931 he became the school's headmaster.

== During Nazi Germany ==
According to his daughter Hiltigunt, Paul Langen and his wife Clara were the only people in Holzlar who did not vote for the NSDAP in the federal election of March 1933, which was a fact well known in the village. She further claims that the day after the election, two stormtroopers appeared on the schoolyard "to punish him", however "he threw them over the fence".

In contrast to these claims, Langen joined the NSDAP later in May 1933 (membership No. 2,101,008). It has been speculated that without becoming a party member, it might have become difficult for him to remain a teacher after the Law for the Restoration of the Professional Civil Service was passed in April 1933. According to § 4 of this law, "civil servants whose former political activity casts doubt on their absolute loyalty to the national state may be released from service", effectively forcing civil servants to join the party.

Despite his NSDAP membership, Langen publicly opposed the Nazis and Nazi propaganda in many ways. He often listened to BBC radio with his pupils and publicly called the Nazis "criminals". Many of his former pupils remembered him speaking out against the Nazis and the war in conversations with their parents. After the end of World War II, the school compiled a report about Langen. This report states that Langen was known to his colleagues as "an outspoken opponent of national socialism who defended his opinion publicly". A protocol of an interrogation of Langen on 19 January 1944, when was already imprisoned in the Siegburg penitentiary, stated that "his statements reveal opposition to the state in its current form".

== Arrest and death ==
When he visited his daughter Hiltigunt in a labour camp in Houverath near Euskirchen, he told her and some other girls about his opinion regarding the war and that he believed a continuation of the war to be futile. One of the girls reportedly filed a complaint to the camp overseer, who in turn reported the incident to the authorities. The resulting investigation revealed that Langen "spoke out publicly against national socialism".

Langen was arrested by the Gestapo on 17 December 1943 and brought to the Gestapo prison of Cologne for interrogation. After a few days he was moved to the Cologne prison Klingelpütz, a wing of which was used for Gestapo prisoners. As the Klingelpütz was damaged in the Allied bombing of Cologne in 1944, he was later moved to the Siegburg penitentiary. He died there from epidemic typhus on 16 March 1945.

== Legacy ==
In 1954, a major street in Holzlar was named in his honour. On 22 June 2010, a Stolperstein commemorating Langen was placed at the Holzlar primary school.

Memorials to Paul Langen in Holzlar
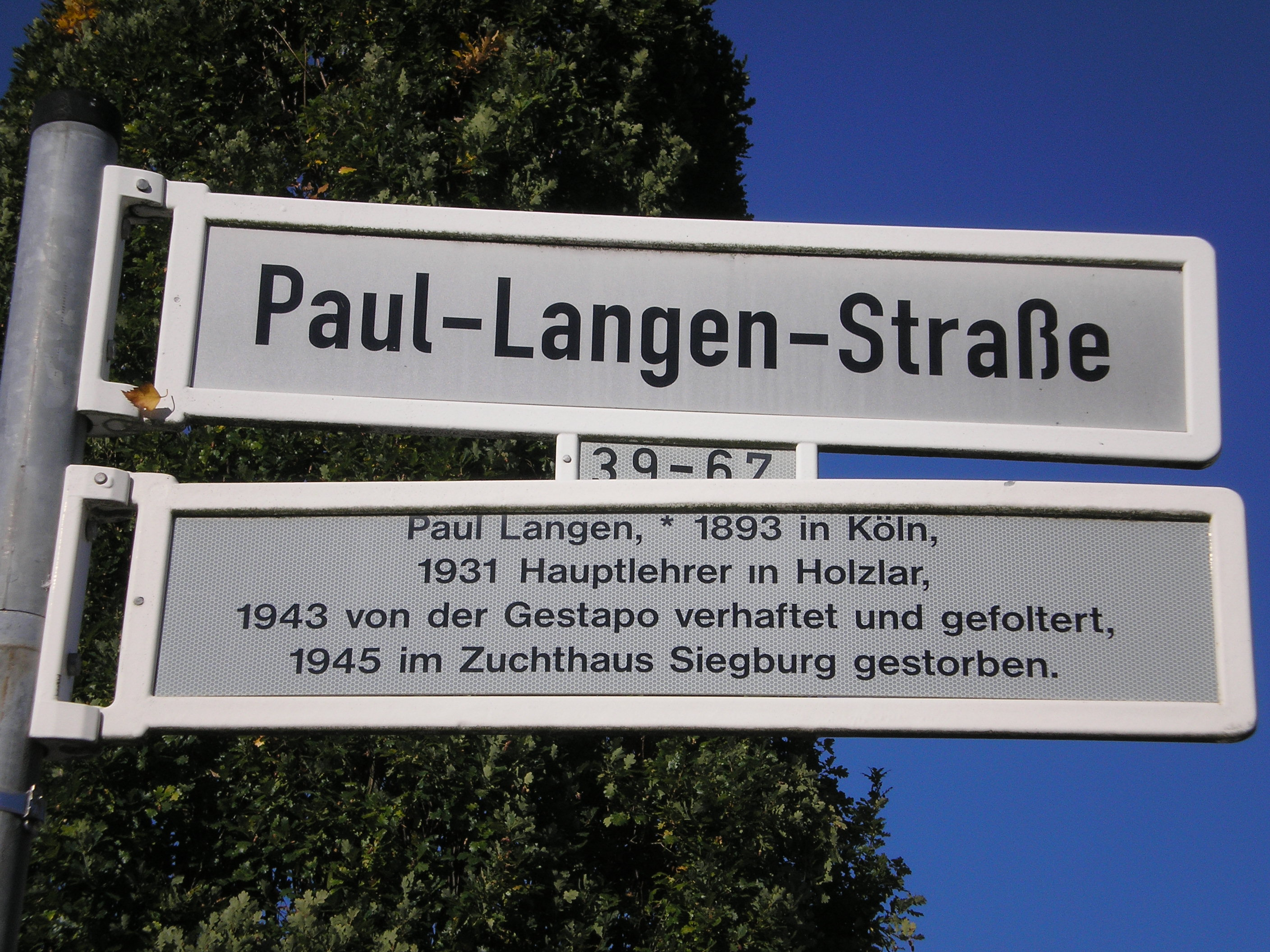
Street sign of the Paul-Langen-Straße

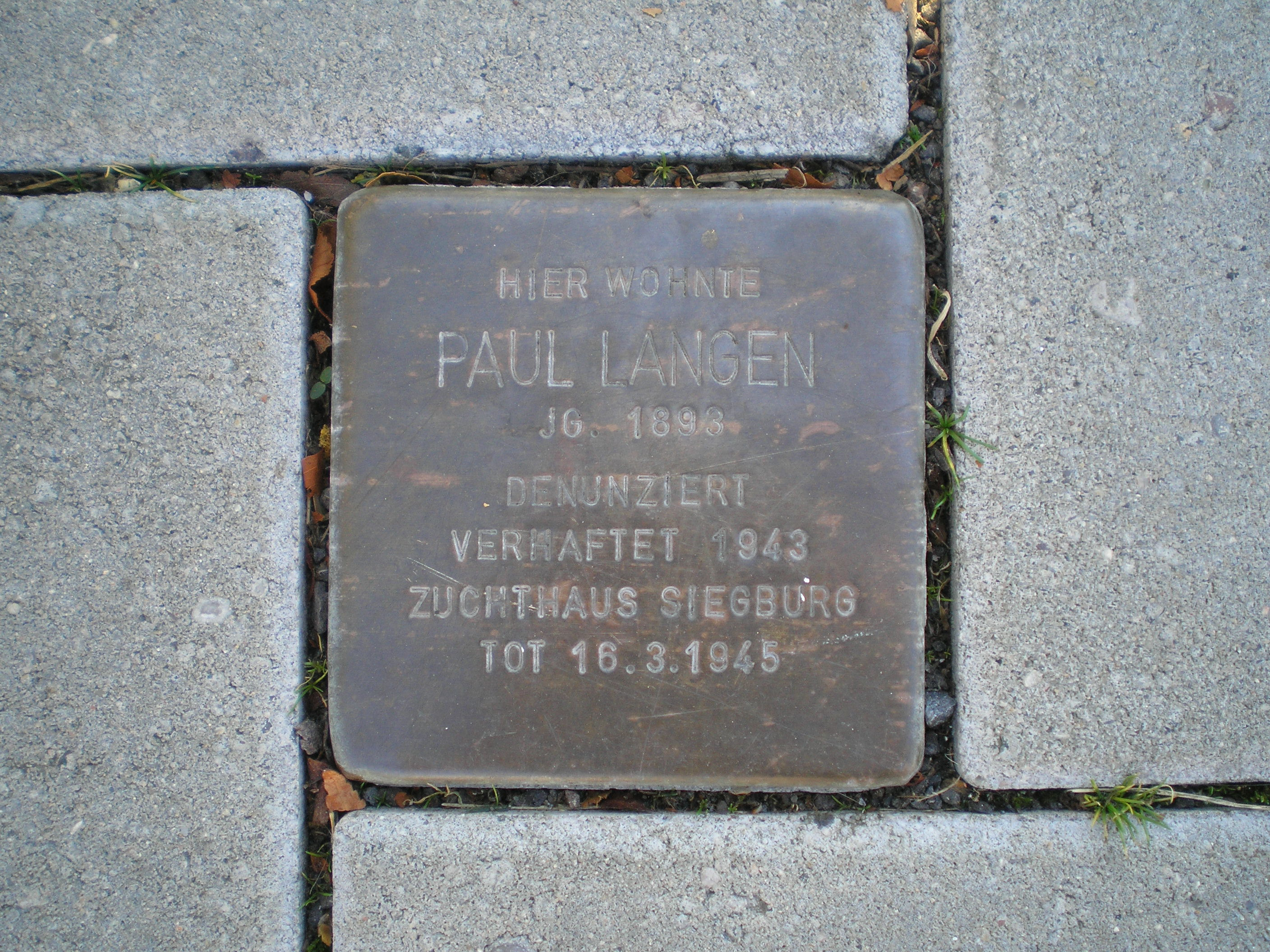
Stolperstein for Paul Langen, placed in 2010
