= Jens Peick =

German politician (born 1981)

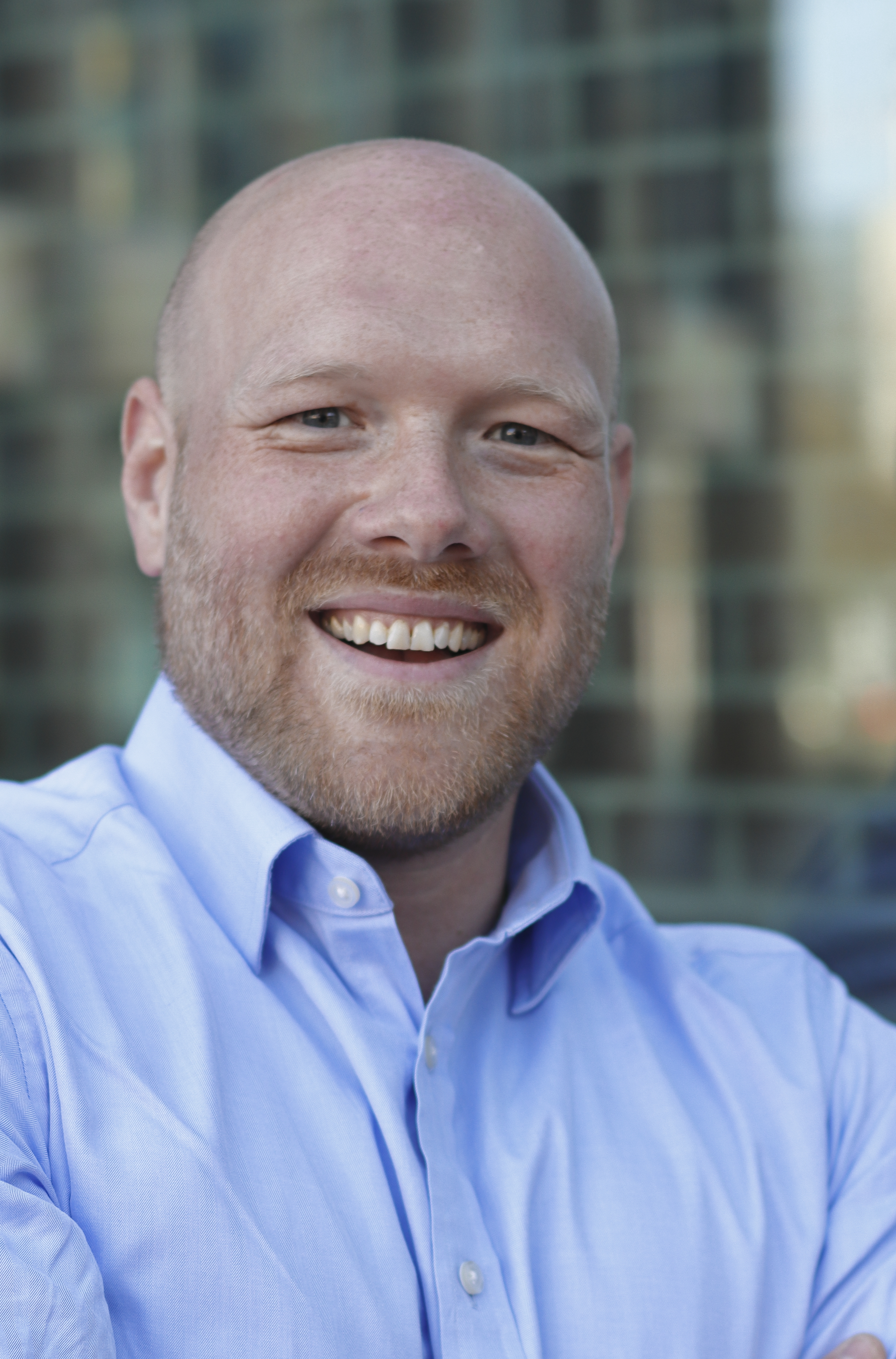
Portrait of Jens Peick

Jens Peick (born 16 August 1981 in Castrop-Rauxel) is a German trade unionist and SPD politician. He is a member of the German Bundestag and chairman of the SPD Dortmund.

== Early life and career ==
Peick was born 1981 in the West German town of Castrop-Rauxel and grew up in the Kirchlinde district of Dortmund. His father was a locksmith in the chemical plant and his mother worked in a curtain store in the Lütgendortmund quarter. After attending grammar school, graduating from high school in 2001 and completing his civilian service, he decided against university education and opted for an apprenticeship with the City of Dortmund, which he completed in 2005 with a degree in administration (Diplom-Verwaltungswirt (FH)). He then worked in various areas of the Dortmund city administration, first as an employment agent in the job center, then as chairman of the youth and trainee representation and finally as an employee in the mayor’s office of Gerhard Langemeyer, Ullrich Sierau and Thomas Westphal. From January 2021 until its closure in the fall of 2021, he was part of the management team of the PHOENIX-West municipal vaccination center in Hörde.

== Political career ==
Peick joined the SPD in 2000. He has been a member of the sub-district executive of the SPD Dortmund since 2002 and was its deputy chairman from 2014 to 2021. On November 20, 2021, he was elected to succeed Nadja Lüders as chairman of the subdistrict.

In 2020 Peick was asked by the employees of Klinikum Dortmund to take over the position of labor director. Contrary to the proposal of the employee representatives and the positive decision of the supervisory board of the Klinikum, the council factions of the CDU, The Greens and FDP decided, ahead of the city of Dortmund council vote, to deny Jens Peick the approval. Subsequently he withdrew his candidacy for Labor Director.

In the 2021 German federal election, Peick stood as a direct candidate in constituency 142 (Dortmund I) and was elected to the German Bundestag with 33.0% of the first-past-the-post vote.

Within his parliamentary group, Peick belongs to the Parliamentary Left, a left-wing movement.

== Memberships ==
Peick has been a member of the trade union ver.di since 2002 and was a member of the Dortmund district executive committee. Furthermore, he was spokesman for the district youth executive committee and chairman of the "DGB Jugend" Dortmund-Hellweg Peick is also a member of the "SJD - Die Falken", the "Forum DL21 e.V." and the "Sozialdemokratische Gemeinschaft für Kommunalpolitik" (SGK).

== Personal life ==
In his spare time Peick practices the martial art Ju Jutsu in the Police Sports Club Dortmund 1922 e.V. and plays guitar in a blues rock band.
