= Bruno Kahl =

Civil servant and lawyer

Bruno Guntram Wilhelm Kahl

13th President of the Federal Intelligence Service
- In office 1 July 2016 – 15 September 2025
- Chancellor: Angela Merkel; Olaf Scholz; Friedrich Merz
- Vice President: Werner Sczesny
- Vice President: Ole Diehl

Personal details
- Born: 12 July 1962 (age 64) Essen, West Germany
- Citizenship: Germany
- Party: Christian Democratic Union
- Education: University of Bonn, University of Lausanne

Bruno Guntram Wilhelm Kahl (born 12 July 1962 in Essen, West Germany) is a German civil servant and administrative lawyer. From 2016 to 2025 he served as President of the Federal Intelligence Service (Bundesnachrichtendienst).

== Early life and education ==
Kahl was born as the first child of Bernhard and Ute Kahl (née Schoenitz) in Essen, West Germany. He completed his Abitur in 1981 at Kardinal-Frings-Gymnasium in Bonn-Beuel and military service from 1981 until 1983, then studied law until 1988 at the University of Bonn and the University of Lausanne. Alongside his studies, he also completed journalistic training at the Katholische Journalistenschule ifp in Munich. After his first state examinations, he clerked in Bonn and Speyer, Germany, and Sydney, Australia.

Kahl is a colonel (Oberst) in the Reserves of the Bundeswehr.

== Career ==
In 1994, Kahl completed his second state examination at the Oberlandesgericht of Cologne, and then worked for the Confederation of German Employers' Associations. From 1995 to 1996, he was a desk officer at the Federal Chancellery. From 1996 until 2005, he was assigned as an adviser to the CDU/CSU parliamentary group, where he performed preliminary work for the group's chairman Wolfgang Schäuble. Since then, he has been a close confidant of Schäuble.

In 2005 in the First Merkel cabinet, Kahl served as head of the Minister's Office and spokesman of Schäuble at the Federal Ministry of the Interior (BMI), where he became head of the executive group in 2006. In 2008, Kahl was awarded a Doctor of Law by the University of Bonn, authoring his dissertation on elements of Catholic thought in Carl Schmitt's secular political theory. In 2010, Kahl followed Schäuble to the Federal Ministry of Finance (BMF), where he also served as head of the executive staff. Beginning in 2011, Kahl acted as Undersecretary for Directorate-General VIII (Privatisation, industrial holdings and federal real estate) at BMF. In this capacity, he also served on the Supervisory Board of Portigon AG from 2012 until 2015.

Kahl was appointed President of the Federal Intelligence Service on 27 April 2016, effective 1 July, after the dismissal of Gerhard Schindler. His replacement at the BMF is Johannes Schmalzl.

Kahl is a member of the Christian Democratic Union of Germany (CDU).

In February 2022, Kahl was in Ukraine when Russia invaded and had to be taken home overland in a two-day journey by special forces when the country's airspace was closed.

Only a few days before, Kahl had declared that Putin had not yet decided whether to attack Ukraine.

In September 2025, Kahl became the German Ambassador to the Holy See. Former ambassador to Ukraine Martin Jäger succeeded him as President of the BND.

== Personal life ==
Kahl has two daughters and has been widowed since 2008.

== Publications ==
- Europäische Union: Bundesstaat – Staatenbund - Staatenverbund? Zum Urteil des BVerfG vom 12. Oktober 1993. In: Der Staat, Volume 33, 1994, p. 241 ff.
- Bruno Kahl: "Elemente katholischen Denkens in säkularer Staatslehre zum Frühwerk Carl Schmitts", Dissertation, Berlin, 2007
- Bruno Kahl et al. (ed.): Der fröhliche Sisyphos – für Wolfgang Schäuble, Herder, Freiburg im Breisgau, 2012 ISBN 978-3-45130663-1.
- Der Große Vaterländische Betrieb – Warum die Treuhand eine Erfolgsgeschichte wurde? In: Otto Depenheuer, Karl-Heinz Paqué (eds.): Einheit – Eigentum – Effizienz: Bilanz der Treuhandanstalt. Gedächtnisschrift zum 20. Todestag von Dr. Detlev Karsten Rohwedder. Springer-Verlag, Heidelberg 2012, ISBN 978-3-64233114-5, pp. 95–97.
- Bruno Kahl, Andreas Kerst: Öffentliche Unternehmen. In: Werner Gatzer, Tilmann Schweisfurth (eds.): Öffentliche Finanzwirtschaft in der Staatspraxis, BWV Verlag, Berlin, 2015 ISBN 978-3-83053325-2, pp. 613–642.
