= Kardinal-Frings-Gymnasium =

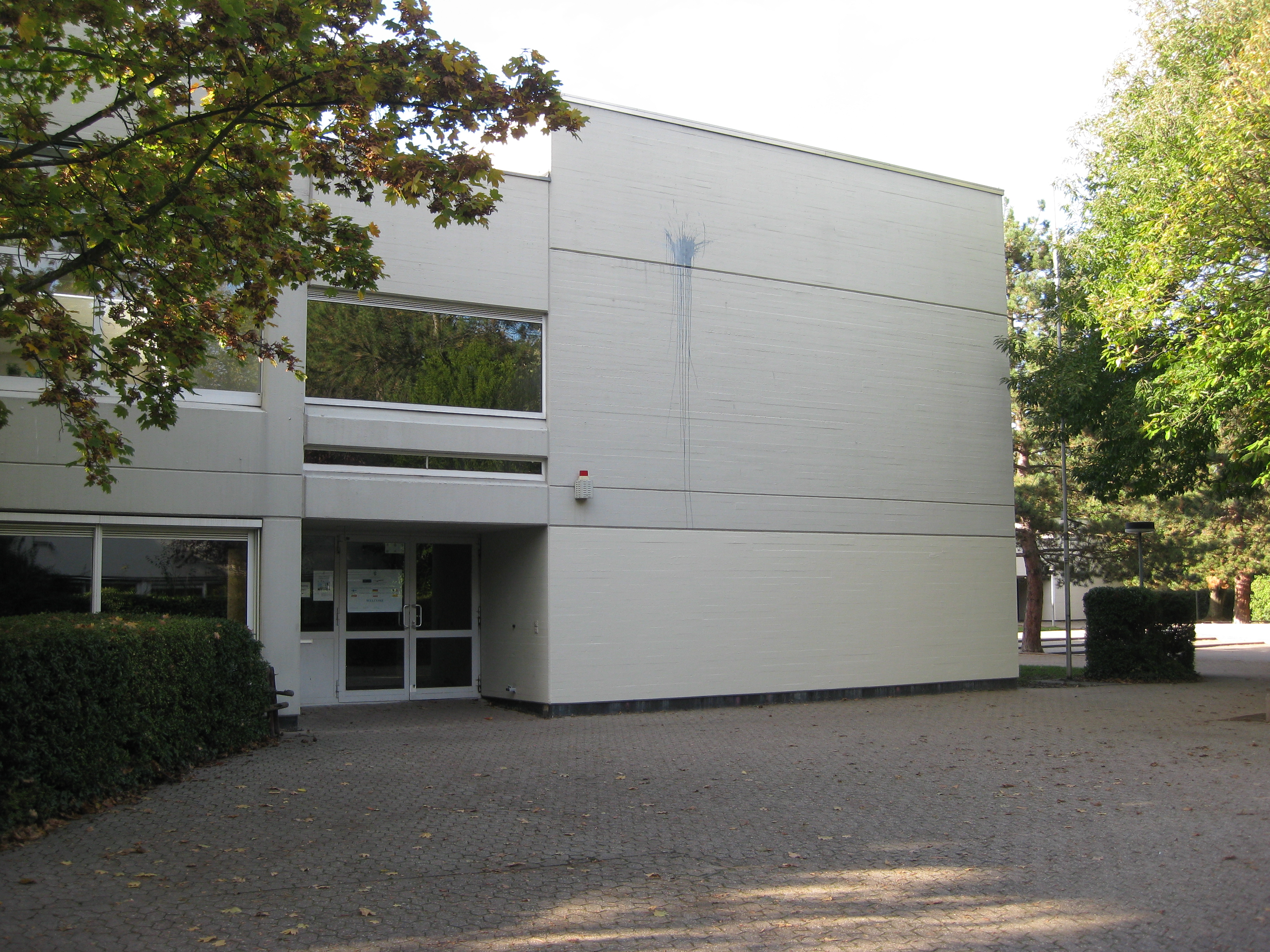
- Main entrance of Kardinal-Frings-Gymnasium

Location
- Elsa-Brändström-Straße 71–91; Bonn-Beuel, North Rhine-Westphalia; Germany
- Coordinates: 50.7273°N 7.1268°E

Information
- Former name: Erzbischöfliches Gymnasium Beuel (until 1979)
- Type: Private gymnasium
- Motto: Latin: Pro hominibus constitutus (Sent for the people)
- Religious affiliation: Roman Catholic
- Opened: 1964; 62 years ago
- Founder: Josef Cardinal Frings
- School board: Archdiocese of Cologne
- School number: 166273
- Principal: Bernhard Hillen
- Chaplain: Andreas Haermayer
- Teaching staff: 68 (January 2017)
- Gender: Boys (1964-1987); Co-educational (since 1988)
- Enrollment: 850 (July 2017)
- Classes offered: 5-12
- Nickname: KFG
- Website: www.kfg-bonn.de

The Kardinal-Frings-Gymnasium (KFG, until 1979 Erzbischöfliches Gymnasium Beuel) is a private catholic secondary school of the Roman Catholic Archdiocese of Cologne in Beuel, a borough of the former German capital Bonn in North Rhine-Westphalia.

== History ==
The school was founded in 1964 as Erzbischöfliches Gymnasium Beuel (EBG) by the Archbishop of Cologne, Josef Kardinal Frings. It was a boys' school. The school building in the south of Beuel, which includes an assembly hall, a sports field, three sports halls, a cafeteria and a nuclear bunker was planned by the famous architect Joachim Schürmann. After Frings' death in 1978, the school decided to assume the name of its founder and was officially named as Kardinal-Frings-Gymnasium on December 8, 1979. In 1988, the school was opened for girls.

== Headmasters ==
Ordinal	Principal	Term start	Term end	Time in office	Notes
1	Aloys Zillien	1964	1980	15–16 years	
2	Arnd Zimmermann	1980	1994	13–14 years	
3	Rudolf Lenzen	1994	1995	0–1 years	Provisional
4	Karl-Ludwig Wimberger	1995	2008	12–13 years	
5	Bernhard Hillen	2008	incumbent	17–18 years	

== Profile ==
English and Latin are compulsory languages at the school. Moreover, the students can decide to learn French from class 8 and Spanish from class 10.There's also a voluntary Italian-course for students in grade 9. In the advanced level, there exist corporations with the Liebfrauenschule Bonn and the Sankt-Adelheid-Gymnasium.

The school is known for its brass orchestra. The popular German brass band Querbeat, which is active in the Cologne Carnival, was founded in 2001 as a school band of the Kardinal-Frings-Gymnasium.
In 2001, the school initiated the Social Project Armenia. At an annual run the students collect money, which is used for an exchange program, the support of German lessons at two partner schools in Gyumri and the renovating of village schools in the north-Armenian Region Shirak. The donation volume in the last 15 years is more than 250.000 Euros (December 2017).

On July 3, 2018, the KFG hosted a ten-minute live switch to the German ESA-astronaut Alexander Gerst, who answered the students' questions from the International Space Station ISS via amateur radio. The contact was part of the ARISS project and was carried out by the German Amateur Radio Club and the German Aerospace Center. Guests included the former astronaut Reinhold Ewald.

== Partner schools ==
- Tscharenzschool (Gjumri, Armenia)
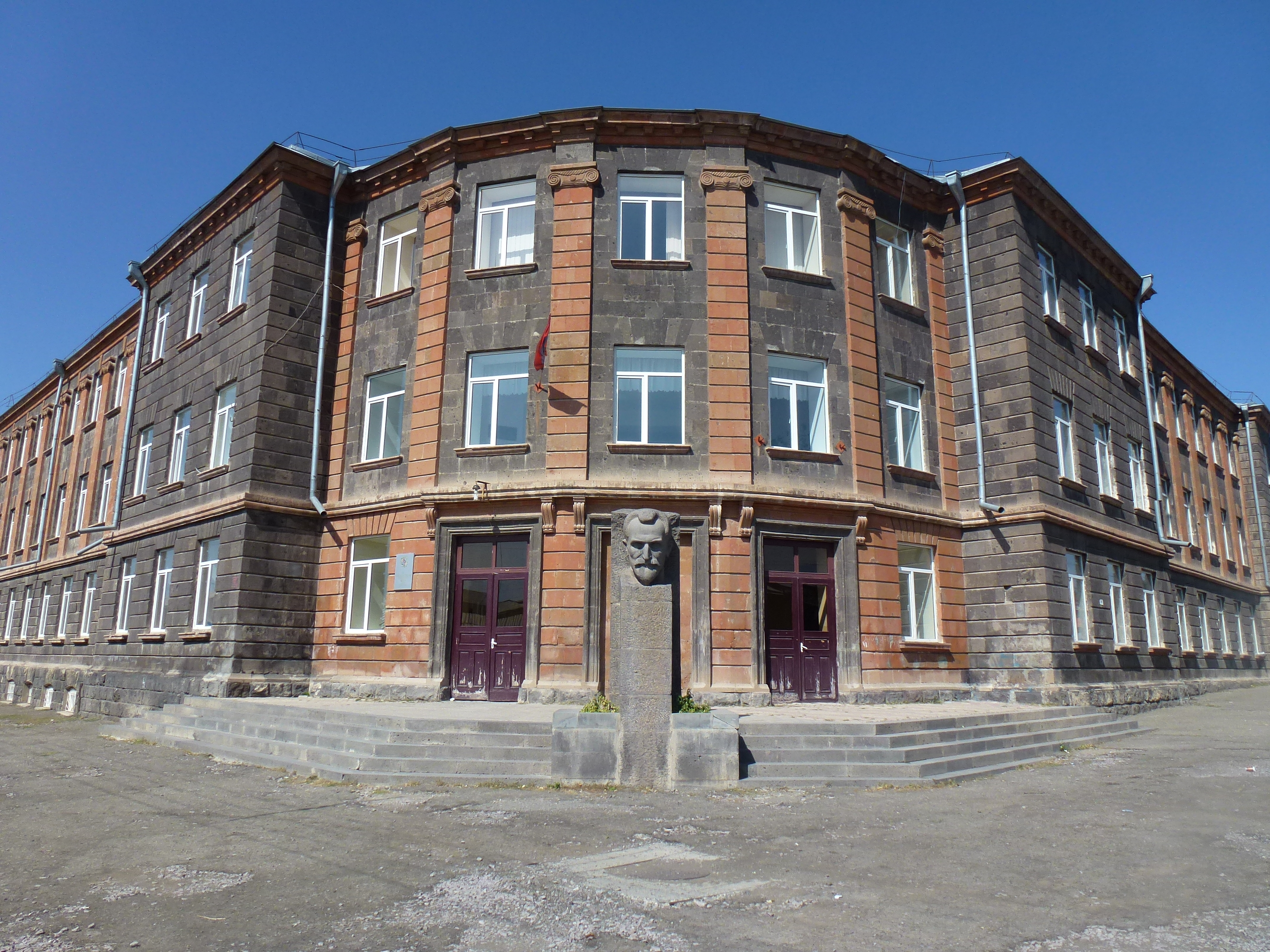
  The Tumanyanschool in Gyumri, Armenia, one of the two partner schools of the Kardinal-Frings-Gymnasium there
- Tumanyanschool (Gjumri, Armenia)
- King's School (Sydney, Australia)
- Central Coast Grammar School (Erina, Australia)
- Colegio Alemán (Santiago de Chile, Chile)
- Liceo Linguistico of the Collegio Vescovile Pio X (Treviso, Italy)
- CEU Sanchinarro (Madrid, Spain)
- Colegio Santa Maria Magdalena Sofia (Palma de Mallorca, Spain)
- (Europe) The school is participating in the Erasmus+-programm of the European Commission

== Notable alumni ==
- Jan-Ingwer Callsen-Bracker, German footballer at FC Augsburg
- Sven-Ole Frahm, German artist
- Bruno Kahl, president of the German Federal Intelligence Service
- Markus Kurth, politician in the German parliament for Alliance 90/The Greens
- Deborah Schöneborn, long-distance runner
- Rabea Schöneborn, long-distance runner
- Fabian Thülig, former German Basketballer at Telekom Baskets Bonn

== Notable teachers ==
- Peter Kohlgraf, chaplain and catechist at the KFG 1999–2003, Bishop of Mainz

== See also ==
- Education in Germany
- List of schools in Germany
- Catholic Church in Germany
