= Erzbischöfliche Liebfrauenschule Bonn =

Erzbishöfliche Liebfrauenschule Bonn

Location
- Königstraße 17-19; Bonn, North Rhine-Westphalia 53113; Germany; 50°43′42″N 7°6′7″E

Information
- Other name: Liebfrauenschule Bonn
- School type: Gymnasium
- Religious affiliation: Catholicism
- Founded: 1917
- Founder: School Sisters of Notre Dame
- Träger: Roman Catholic Archdiocese of Cologne
- Head of school: Annika Rüter
- Teaching staff: c. 50
- Gender: Girls
- Enrolment: c. 700
- Website: www.liebfrauenschule-bonn.de

The Erzbischöfliche Liebfrauenschule Bonn (German: [ˈɛʁtsbɪʃø:flɪçə li:pˈfʁaʊənʃu:lə 'bɔn]), often referred to as the Liebfrauenschule Bonn, is a Roman Catholic gymnasium school for girls in the Südstadt quarter of Bonn, North Rhine-Westphalia, Germany.

== History ==
In 1876, a private Catholic school for girls was founded by Bernardine Fröhlich and from 1900 was run by Emilie Heyermann. It was located in Clemensstraße and had c. 250 pupils. In 1917, it was taken over by the School Sisters of Notre Dame, and in 1919 it moved to Königstraße 17–19. From 1938 to 1944, it was closed and replaced by a städtische Oberschule II für Mädchen. In 1945, the Sisters took over the school again and converted it into a gymnasium for modern languages and, until 1975, for high school education for women. In 1975, the Roman Catholic Archdiocese of Cologne took over responsibility for the school. In 1985, it was renovated and the buildings were extended. The school is co-operating in the advanced level with the Kardinal-Frings-Gymnasium and the Sankt-Adelheid-Gymnasium.

== Building ==
The main building of the school is a listed building from the Gründerzeit.

== Notable alumnae ==
- Annika Beck, tennis player
- Laura Herz, Professor of Physics

== See also ==
- Education in Germany
- List of schools in Germany
- Catholic Church in Germany
