= Querbeat =

German pop band

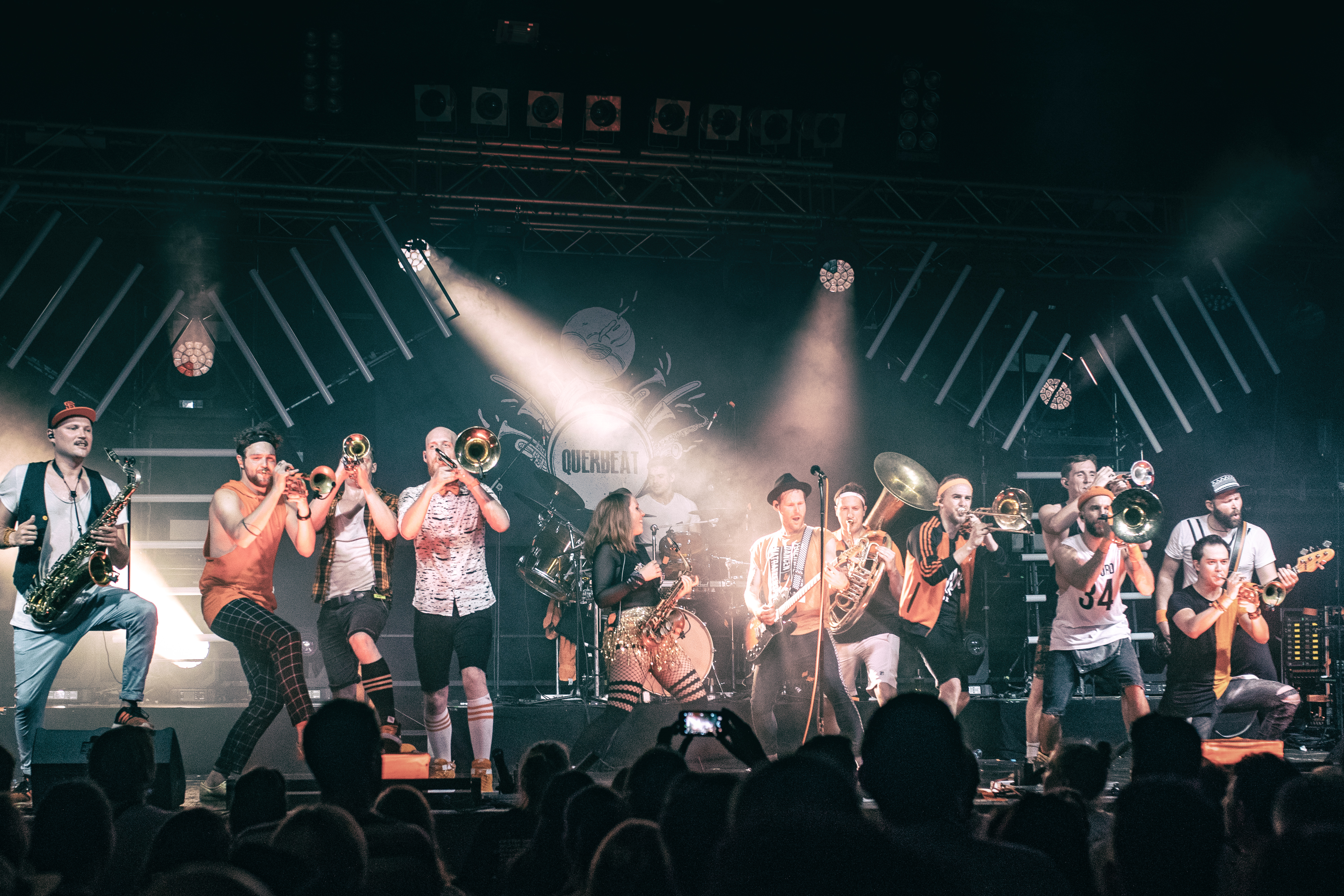
- Querbeat performing in 2018

Background information
- Origin: Cologne and Bonn, North Rhine-Westphalia, Germany
- Genre: Pop
- Years active: 2001–present
- Label: Moshbeat
- Members: Jojo Berger Electric guitar, Vocals; Daniel Breidenbach Trumpet; Valentin Marsall Trumpet; Philipp Mull Trumpet; Stephan Gerhartz Trumpet; Lenny Michaelis Helicon; Sebastian Schneiders Trombone; Hubertus Gierse Trombone; Andy Berger Bass guitar; Carlos Kurschilgen Mellophone; Christian Clever Drum kit; Janine Dornbusch Saxophone; Raoul Vychodil Saxophone
- Website: www.querbeat.info

Querbeat are a German pop band formed in Bonn (Germany) in 2001. They tour mainly around Germany but they also perform at festivals across Europe, primarily in Austria, Switzerland, and Spain, the Netherlands, and Belgium.

== History ==
Querbeat was founded in 2001 as a school band of the Kardinal-Frings-Gymnasium in Bonn-Beuel. In the first years the band played on city events mainly in Bonn and the area around Bonn. In 2007 they started to play in the Cologne Carnival. Querbeat became known by playing on Carnival shows and on TV programs broadcast by the WDR radio and television. In the season 2017/18 the band had 180 gigs.

In November 2010, Querbeat published their first song Colonia Tropical, followed by Allez Olé Alaaf (2011), Stonn op un danz (2012), Hück oder nie (2013) and Nie mehr Fastelovend (2014). The first album Cuba Colonia was released in 2014, which contains Cover versions of famous Carnival songs in latin american style. Querbeat received a Golden Jazz Award for the Album in 2019. Their first album with lyrics and music written exclusively by themselves was Fettes Q in 2016. Since 2017, this album is also available as a live DVD Fettes Q: Live im Palladium. In the same year the band started their first tour through Germany. On 12 October 2018, the second album Randale & Hurra was released. It was the band's first Top 10 album in the German Music Charts. On 23 July 2021, the band's third album Radikal Positiv was released. It entered the Germany Music Charts at number 2.

In 2018 the band performed for the first time at some major German Festivals. Also several TV-appearances and their biggest tour to that point increased their popularity all over Germany.

2019 took Querbeat to even bigger festivals. They performed at Lollapalooza Berlin (Germany), Hurricane Festival (Germany), OpenAir St. Gallen (Switzerland) and Donauinselfest Vienna (Austria) among others.

In 2022 Querbeat started their festival season in front of 25.000 fans performing at their own festival "Randale & Freunde" in Bonn. After that they performed at Nova Rock (Austria), Deichbrand (Germany), Parookaville (Germany), Tollwood (Germany), and Río Babel (Spain).

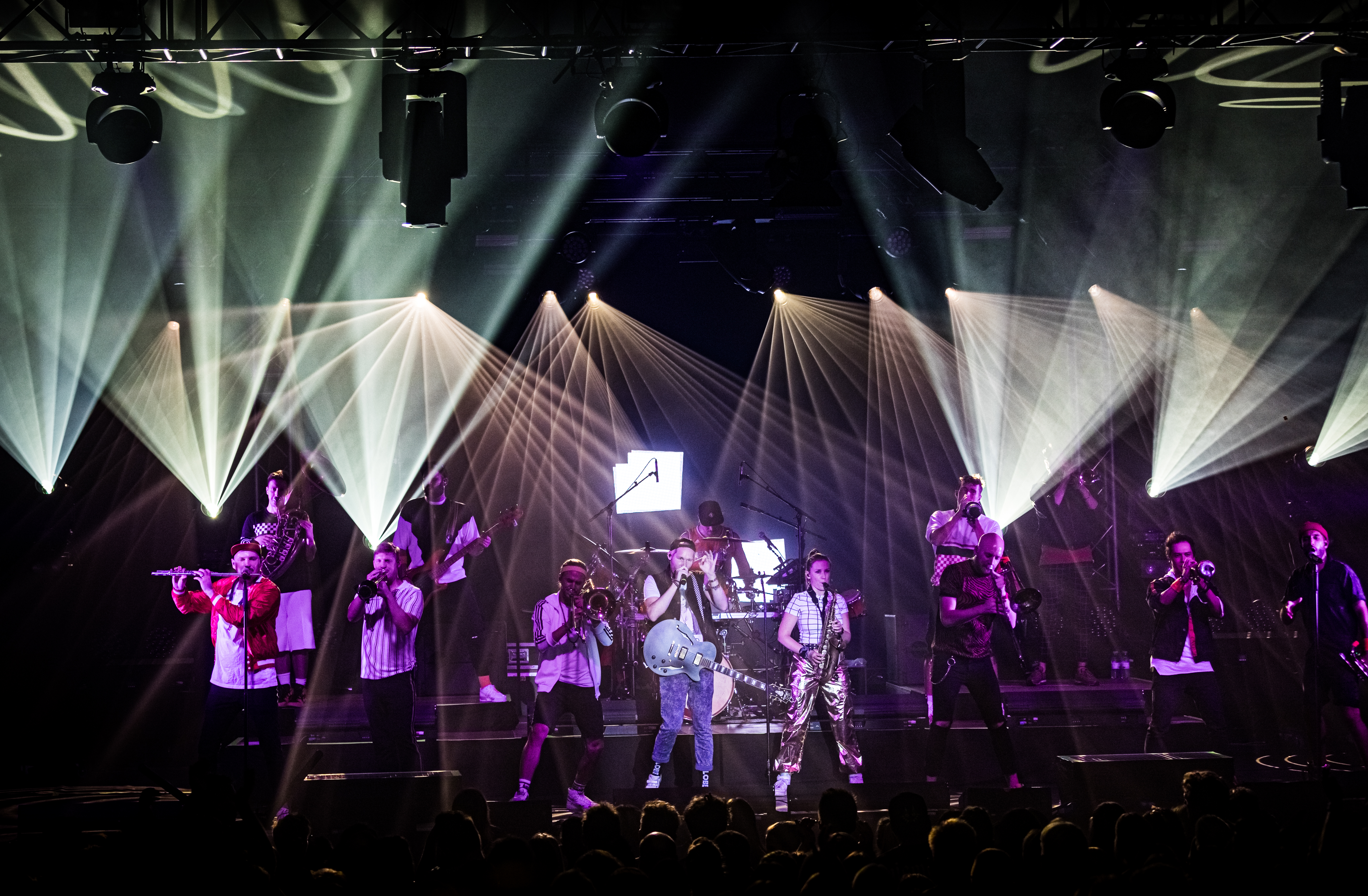
Querbeat live at Leverkusener Jazztage 2019

== Discography ==
=== Albums ===
- Cuba Colonia (2014)
- Fettes Q (2016)
- Randale & Hurra (2018)
- Radikal Positiv (2021)
- Barcelona Tapes EP (2024)

=== Songs ===
- Colonia tropical (2010)
- Allez Olé Alaaf (2011)
- Stonn op un danz (2012)
- Hück oder nie (2013)
- Nie mehr Fastelovend (2014)
- Tschingderassabum (2015)
- Dä Plan (2016)
- Guten Morgen Barbarossaplatz (2017)
- Randale & Hurra (2018)
- Früher wird alles besser (2020)
- Ja (2021)
- Allein (2021)
- Woiswaslos (2021)
- Bunte Pyramiden / Afraid No More (Live-Session Querbeat & Bukahara) (2022)
- Kein Kölsch für Nazis (feat. Lugatti & 9ine, Peter Brings) (2023)
- Eisbär (2024)
- OK Ciao (2024)
- Südsee 96 (2024)

== Awards ==
At the 2024 1LIVE-Krone awards (Germany's most prestigious music awards) the band was nominated in the category of "Best Live Band".
