= Agency for the Modernisation of Ukraine =

Austria-based nongovernmental organization

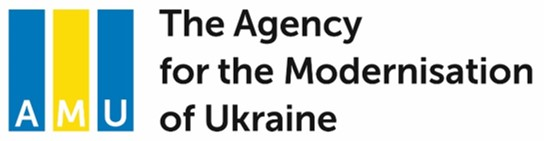

The Agency for the Modernisation of Ukraine (AMU) is a nongovernmental organization. The AMU promotes political stability and economic growth within Ukraine. It was founded in March 2015 and is headquartered in Vienna. The former Austrian politician Michael Spindelegger is President of the AMU.

== Objective ==
The AMU wishes to develop a modernisation programme for Ukraine that will be submitted to the Ukrainian parliament in fall 2015. Seven political and economic experts are working on the programme: Włodzimierz Cimoszewicz, former Prime Minister of Poland; Professor Otto Depenheuer, legal scholar from Germany; Bernard Kouchner, founder of Doctors Without Borders and the former French Minister of Foreign and European Affairs; Lord Ken Macdonald, former Director of Public Prosecutions (DPP) of England and Wales; Waldemar Pawlak, former Prime Minister of Poland and Günter Verheugen, former Vice President of the European Commission. Each individual is subject to a certain sphere of action:

- Combating corruption in Ukraine (Włodzimierz Cimoszewicz)
- Constitution of Ukraine (Otto Depenheuer)
- Health in Ukraine (Bernard Kouchner)
- Rule of law (Lord Ken Macdonald)
- Economy of Ukraine (Waldemar Pawlak)
- EU integration (Günter Verheugen)

According to a broadcast of the AMU, in summer 2015 there will be a “round table” in Ukraine for each sphere of action. These will include NGOs as well as Ukrainian citizens. The AMU was founded at the suggestion of the Ukrainian Social Partners, the Trade Unions Federation of Ukraine and the Confederation of Employers of Ukraine, whose chairman, Dmytro Firtash, has provided the funds for the AMU.
