= Thomas Westphal =

German politician, lord mayor of Dortmund

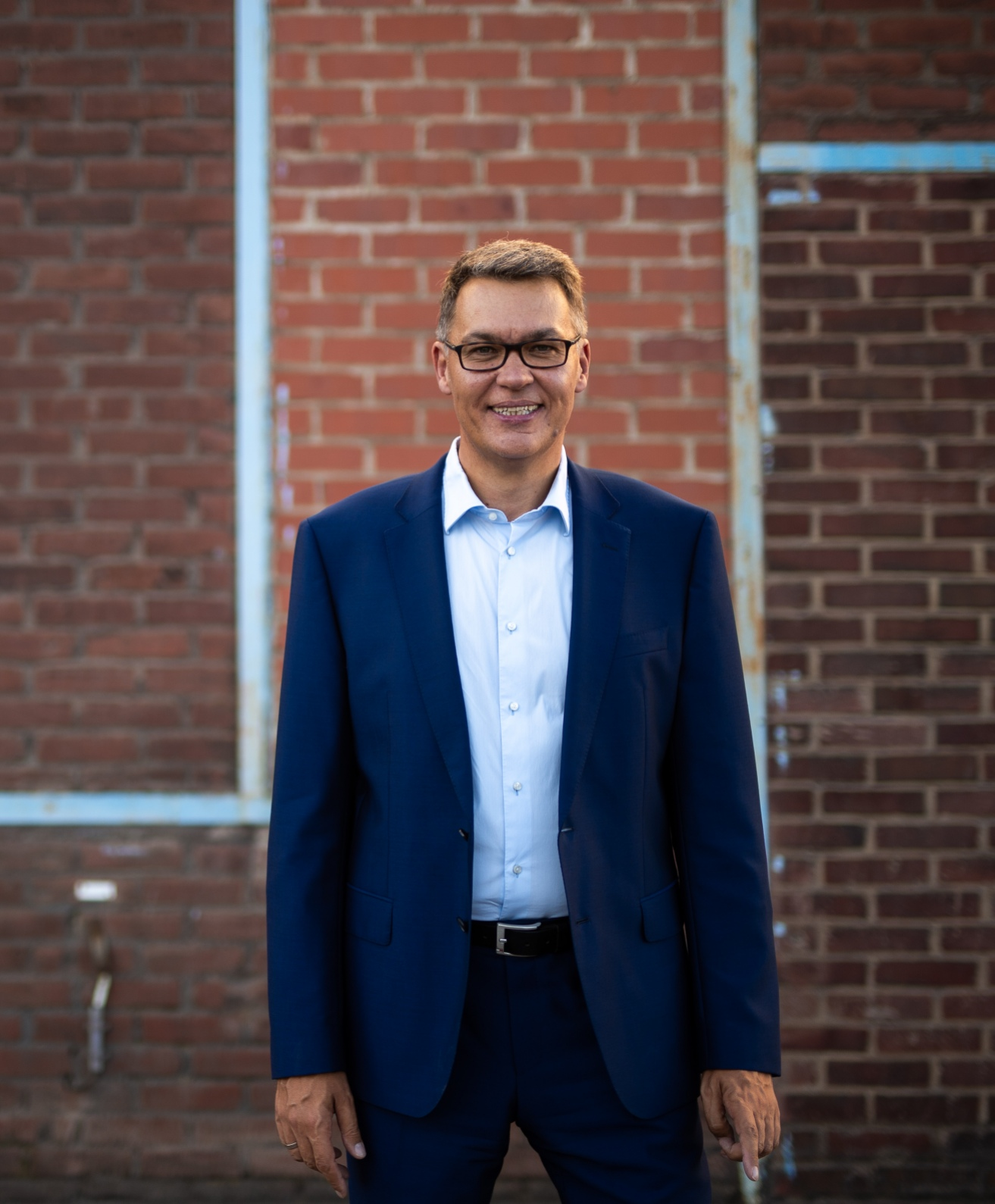
- Thomas Westphal, 2018

Lord Mayor of Dortmund
- Incumbent
- Assumed office 1 November 2020
- Preceded by: Ullrich Sierau

Personal details
- Born: 22 February 1967 (age 59) Lübeck, West Germany
- Party: Social Democratic Party of Germany
- Occupation: Politician

Thomas Westphal (born 22 February 1967 in Lübeck) is a German economist, politician (SPD) and the lord mayor of Dortmund. Previously, he was managing director of City of Dortmund Economic Development Agency from 2014 to 2020. Before, he was managing director of business development metropoleruhr (Wirtschaftsförderung metropoleruhr, wmr), whose advisory board he still belongs to today. From 1993 to 1995 he was Federal Chairman of the Jusos. Westphal assumed as the lord mayor of Dortmund on 1 November 2020.

== Professional career ==
Westphal grew up in Lübeck and studied economics at the Hochschule für Politik und Wirtschaft in Hamburg. He is a long-standing co-editor of Spw – Zeitschrift für sozialistische Politik und Wirtschaft (Journal for Socialist Politics and Economy).

After Westphal was managing director of managing director of business development metropoleruhr (wmr) from 2010, he took over the post of managing director of the Economic Development Agency of the City of Dortmund in 2013. He previously worked for Rhenus AG, SCI Verkehr GmbH, ISA Consult and most recently for Wincanton GmbH in Weinheim.

During his work as managing director of the Economic Development Agency, Westphal initiated a new economic policy orientation for the City of Dortmund from the end of 2014.

Westphal describes start-ups of new companies as a "crucial driving force" for structural change in Dortmund. By attracting new, knowledge-intensive start-ups and increasing the number of branches of local companies, Dortmund should become an important location for innovation. In concrete terms, this means the establishment of new research institutes and universities and the long-term commitment of founders to Dortmund. In this way, the entire city's demand for services such as gastronomy, hotels and retail is to be increased by tying skilled workers and trade tax revenues to Dortmund as a location.

== Politics ==
=== Early years and federal chairman of the Jusos ===
Initially, Thomas Westphal was active in Lübeck and Schleswig-Holstein for the Jusos and in the SPD. He was part of a political movement who called themselves "Juso-Linke" (Juso-left) and were also known as "Stamokaps" (Staatsmonopolistischer Kapitalismus, state monopolistic capitalism).

Westphal was elected as the federal chairman of the Jusos at the Juso federal congress in 1993. At the Juso federal congress in Gera in May 1995 he was re-elected a one-vote majority over his opponent Stephan Grüger of the so-called Reformsozialisten (reform socialists). Because invalid votes for Westphal had been counted and delegates who had not been correctly elected had been reported from different regional associations (Landesverbände), the federal arbitration commission (Bundesschiedskommission) of the SPD declared the election of the chairperson invalid a few weeks later. At the following extraordinary federal congress of the Jusos with repeat elections in Bonn-Bad Godesberg, he renounced a new candidacy there and proposed Andrea Nahles as his successor.

=== SPD vice chairman and Lord Mayor of Dortmund ===
Since April 2018, Westphal is vice chairman of the SPD sub-district of Dortmund. He ran as the SPD's candidate at the local elections in North Rhine-Westphalia in 2020 for the position of the Lord Mayor of Dortmund. In the first ballot on 13 September, he received 35.87% of the vote entered the runoff on 27 September, where he won over the CDU candidate Andreas Hollstein with 52.06%. He took office on 1 November 2020. He succeeds Ullrich Sierau (SPD), who was no longer a candidate. In October 2025 he lost against CDU-politician Omar Kalouti.

== Personal life ==
Westphal lives in Dortmund since 1996. He is married and has two children.
