= Otto Depenheuer =

German law professor and organist

- Born: 1953 (age 71–72); Bonn, West Germany
- Occupation(s): Legal scholar, organist
- Employer: University of Cologne
- Known for: Constitutional law; philosophy of law; Selbstbehauptung des Rechtsstaates

Otto Depenheuer (born 1953 in Bonn) is a German legal scholar and organist. He is a professor of constitutional law, public law, and philosophy of law at the University of Cologne, and is also known for his work as a concert organist. Depenheuer gained national attention in 2007 when German Minister of the Interior Wolfgang Schäuble publicly recommended his book Selbstbehauptung des Rechtsstaates (Self-assertion of the Constitutional State), sparking public debate over his interpretations of state power, terrorism, and the legacy of Carl Schmitt.

== Biography ==
Depenheuer studied law in Bonn, where he attained his doctorate in 1985 and his habilitation in 1992. After teaching law in Münster and Halle/Saale, Depenheuer was appointed to the chair for public law and philosophy of law at the University of Mannheim in 1993. In 1999, he assumed the chair for constitutional law, public law and philosophy of law at the University of Cologne.

As a musician, Depenheuer was awarded the "Diplome de Concert" in 1986 at the Schola Cantorum in Paris. He has performed at organ concerts in Germany and at Notre Dame de Paris, Jerusalem, New York City, Singapore and Kraków. He has also edited numerous organ sonatas.

Since 2015, Depenheuer has been the workstream leader for the AMU (Agency for the Modernisation of Ukraine), where he contributes his expertise in law.

== Criticism and controversy ==
Depenheuer's works have become a matter of public interest in Germany after the conservative German Minister of the Interior, Wolfgang Schäuble, recommended the lecture of Depenheuer's book Selbstbehauptung des Rechtsstaates (English: Self-assertion of the constitutional state) in a 2007 interview. According to a critical review of the book by Gunter Hofmann, the book is centered on the necessity of the state to defend itself in a "global civil war" in the "age of terrorism", and refers to the U.S.'s Guantanamo Bay detention camp as a "legally permissible response in the fight of constitutional civilisation against the barbarity of terrorism". Depenheuer's critics accuse him of promoting the anti-liberal thought of authoritarian theorist Carl Schmitt, who is liberally cited in the book, and of perceiving terrorism as a faceless evil to which state-organised violence is the sole appropriate response. In his defence, Depenheuer stated in an interview that "enemy and victim are fundamental categories of politics" and referred to "some of the constitution's numerous exegetes", who disagree with him, as a "security risk".

== Bibliography ==
- Selbstbehauptung des Rechtsstaates. Paderborn: Ferdinand Schöningh, 2007. ISBN 978-3-506-75743-2.
