= Ullrich Sierau =

Lord Mayor of Dortmund (Social Democrat)

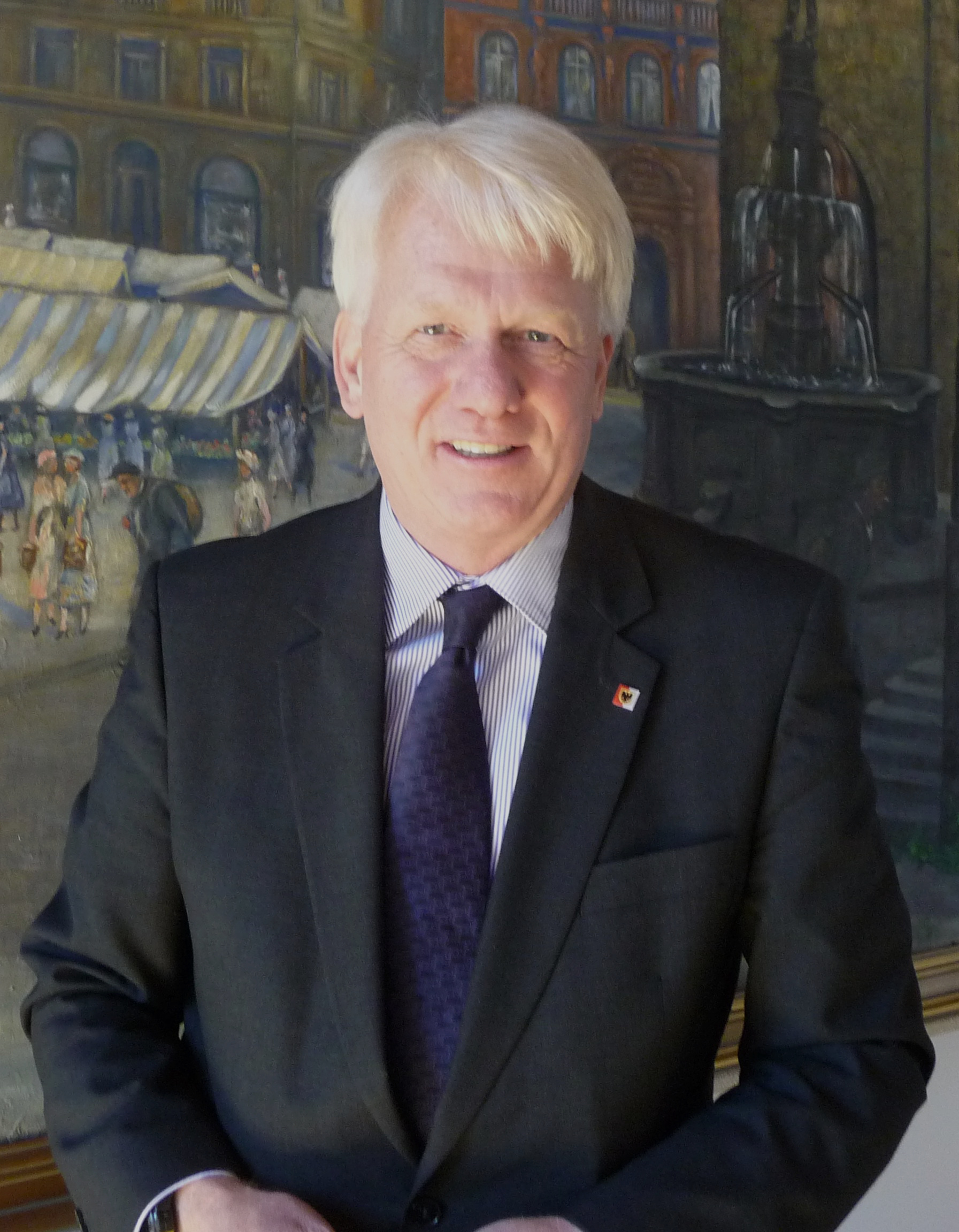
- Ullrich Sierau, May 2012

Lord Mayor of Dortmund
- In office 9 May 2010 – 1 Nov 2020
- Preceded by: Gerhard Langemeyer
- Succeeded by: Thomas Westphal

Personal details
- Born: 6 March 1956 (age 70) Halle an der Saale, East Germany
- Party: Social Democratic Party of Germany
- Occupation: Politician

Ullrich Sierau (born 6 March 1956) is a German politician from the Social Democratic Party of Germany and, since 15 June 2014, for the third time, has been the lord mayor of Dortmund. After retaining this position already from 21 October 2009 to 18 January 2010, he was re-elected in an election on May 9, 2010, repeat election of the mayor elections in 2009 for mayor of Dortmund. His term would last until 2016. In the local elections in North Rhine-Westphalia in 2014, Sierau approached again, reaching a vote share of 43.7%. When carried out in the June 15, 2014 runoff he, then reached 51.6% of the vote, his opposition candidate Annette Littmann from the Christian Democratic Union of Germany, who received 32.0% in the first ballot, subjected to 48.4%.

== Early life and education ==
Sierau is the son of Otto and Anneliese Sierau, and was one of three children. At the end of 1958, the Sierau family fled from the GDR to Wolfsburg, where, in 1974, he completed his secondary education. Sierau began, in Dortmund, studied spatial planning and closed it after several study trips to Africa, Asia and South America in 1982 as a "Diplom-Ingenieur (Dipl.-Ing.) in Spatial Planning".

== Political career ==
Sierau worked at the State Ministry of Urban Development, Housing and Transport of North Rhine-Westphalia in 1986. He was promoted to Ministerial in 1993 and in October 1993, at the request of the SPD parliamentary group on leave to participate in the "Government Programme 1994". From 1994 to 1999, he was director of the Institute for Regional and Urban Development Research of North Rhine-Westphalia (ILS) in Dortmund. From 1 May 1999 to 31 March 2005, he was part of Environment and Planning Department of the City of Dortmund. On 15 February 2007 he was appointed City Manager of the City of Dortmund.

=== Mayor of Dortmund, 2008–present ===
Within the SPD Dortmund developed in 2008 a discussion of possible candidates for the post of Mayor in the forthcoming local elections. In an intra-party members survey, Sierau sat with 64% through to the second candidate Jörg Stüdemann and was officially elected on the SPD subdistrict Party with 97.4% of the vote for the SPD mayor candidate.

On 30 August 2009, Sierau had 45.5% of the vote, succeeding Gerhard Langemeyer (SPD) as mayor of Dortmund. After his election, Sierau was criticized because he was accused of being aware of significant funding gaps in the budget of the city of Dortmund prior to his election and keeping this knowledge private before the election. Despite the considerable criticism of this behavior, he assumed the post as mayor. After a member appointed by the city of Dortmund Council expressed their opinion on the election affair and had recommended a repetition of the local elections in Dortmund, Sierau agreed to a new election. This was decided by the city of Dortmund Council on 10 December 2009.

On 19 January 2010, Sierau resigned from his duties. A person from the social department, Siegfried Pogadl, headed in his function as a city manager to manage the city. Sierau joined his former position as Planning Department of the city again.

On 9 May 2010, Sierau was re-elected with 43.8% of the vote for lord mayor of Dortmund. He was inaugurated on 18 May 2010.

A change in the municipal code in 2007 and a concomitant extension of the term of the mayor had the consequence that the elections of the councils and district councils and the choice of headquarters officials fell apart (mayor, mayor and district administrators) in North Rhine-Westphalia.

The newly elected state government of North Rhine-Westphalia in 2012 was created with the law to strengthen local democracy for some key administrative officials whose term ends before 20 October 2015, and the unique opportunity to resign prematurely in order already by 25 May 2014 to enable a common election date for the councils and headquarters officials.

Based on the decision by Sierau in December 2009, to face the repeat election on 9 May 2010, whose term of office has been set for this election by individual decree of the Interior Ministry for six years. It ended, thus scheduled, on 18 May 2016. Therefore, Sierau did not fall under the provisions of the Act to strengthen local democracy.

Sierau nevertheless decided to resign from his position as mayor with effect on 22 June 2014 so as to perform a common choice of local bodies and the Mayor of Dortmund on 25 May 2014. Since the provisions of the Act to strengthen local democracy not intervened in this case, a non-selection for loss of Sierau's pension entitlements from the time he would have led as mayor. The Regierungsbezirk of Arnsberg had raised no legal objections to a resignation and the renewed candidacy.

He explained his decision with the strengthening of democracy by an expected higher turnout and cost savings of at least EUR 500,000 by the common election date.

Sierau did not run for the local elections as a mayor in 2020. His successor will be Thomas Westphal, who was elected in the runoff election on September 27, 2020.

== Mandate and Functions ==
=== Corporate boards ===
- Dortmunder Stadtwerke (DSW21), Chairman of the Supervisory Board
- Dortmunder Energie- und Wasserversorgung (DEW21), Chairman of the Supervisory Board
- Sparkasse Dortmund, Chairman of the Supervisory Board
- Klinikum Dortmund, Member of the Supervisory Board
- RWE, Member of the Supervisory Board
- Borussia Dortmund, Member of the Business Advisory Board

=== Non-profit organizations ===
- Max Planck Institute of Molecular Physiology, Member of the Board of Trustees
- Technical University of Dortmund, Member of the Advisory Board
- Uganda Horticultural Allied Workers Union, Honorary Member
