= Markus Kurth (politician) =

German politician (born 1966)

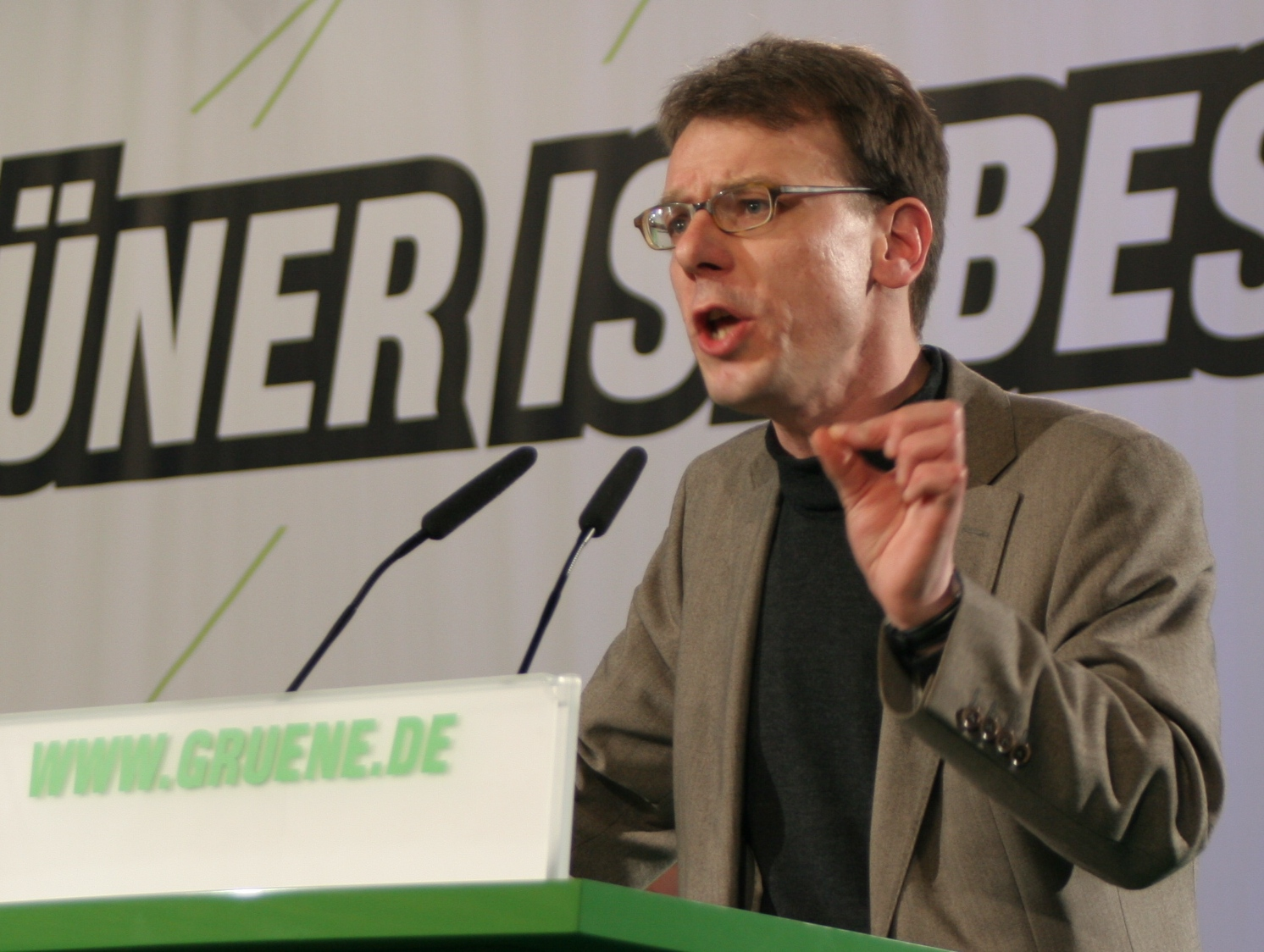
- Markus Kurth in 2006

Member of the Bundestag
- Incumbent
- Assumed office 2017

Personal details
- Born: 14 April 1966 (age 59) Beuel, West Germany (now Germany)
- Party: Greens
- Children: 1

Markus Kurth (born 14 April 1966) is a German politician of Alliance 90/The Greens who has been serving as a member of the Bundestag from the state of North Rhine-Westphalia since 2002.

== Early life and career ==
After graduating from high school in 1985 at the Kardinal-Frings-Gymnasium in Bonn, Kurth did his civilian service with the Caritas Association Bonn until 1987 and then studied political science at the Free University of Berlin, which he completed in 1993 with a degree in political science.

Kurth subsequently worked as a research assistant at the Department of Sociology at Heinrich Heine University in Düsseldorf from 1994 to 1997 and as a freelance political consultant from 1997 to 1998. In 1998, he joined the Initiativkreis Emscherregion as a research associate and in 2002 took over the responsibilities of an education manager at the Heinrich Böll Foundation North Rhine-Westphalia.

== Political career ==
Kurth first became a member of the Bundestag in the 2002 German federal election. He is a member of the Committee on Labour and Social Affairs and spokesman for his group on pension policy.

In the negotiations to form a so-called traffic light coalition of the Social Democratic Party (SPD), the Green Party and the Free Democratic Party (FDP) on the national level following the 2021 German elections, Kurth was part of his party's delegation in the working group on social policy, co-chaired by Dagmar Schmidt, Sven Lehmann and Johannes Vogel.

In November 2024, Kurth announced that he will not seeking re-election for Bundestag in February 2025.
