= Holzlar =

Quarter of Bonn, Germany

Coordinates: 50°44′39″N 7°10′23″E

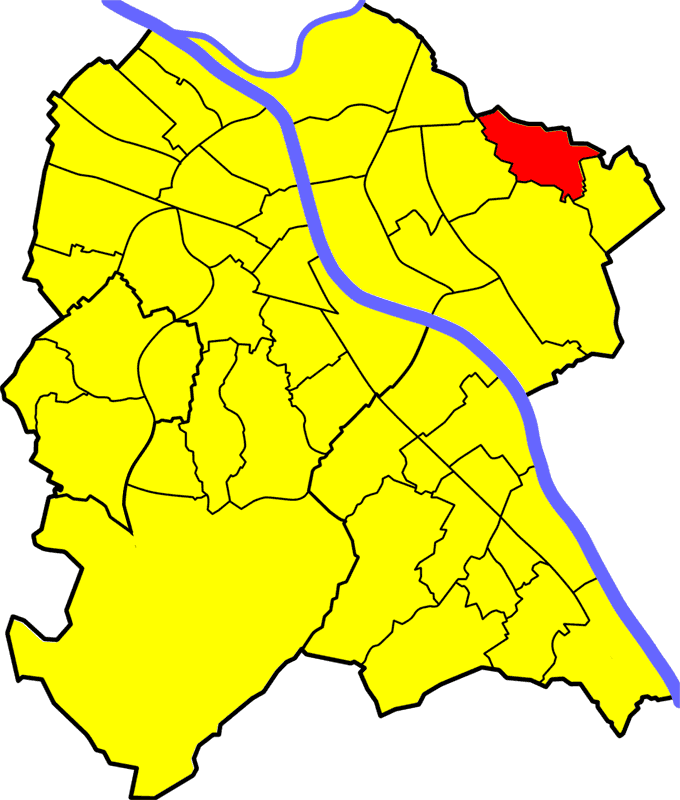
Location of Holzlar in Bonn

Holzlar Is an enclosed settlement in Bonn's district Beuel, east of the Rhine and north of the Siebengebirge in Germany. Holzlar has a population of about 11,000 and consists out of the former villages Holzlar, Kohlkaul, Heidebergen, Roleber and Gielgen.

Today the borders of the villages are no longer visible.

== History and presence ==
The first documented mention of Holzlar was in 1394, where it was referred to as “Hultzelar”. Other documented names are Hultzlair, Holtzlar, Holtzlohr, Holzlahr, and Holtzlahr.

In 1757 the brown coal quarrying started for private use. About 50 years later the brothers Leopold and Abraham Bleibtreu bought properties in Holzlar-Kohlkaul und Holzlar Gielgen and began quarrying brown coal and alum.

In 1969 Holzlar became part of Bonn's district Beuel. Before 1969, Holzlar belonged to the Amt Menden.

Today there are mainly housing estates of higher standard in Roleber, Gielgen, Heidebergen and Holzlar. The north of Holzlar-Kohlkaul as well as other areas offer in addition subsidized housing.

== The watermill ==
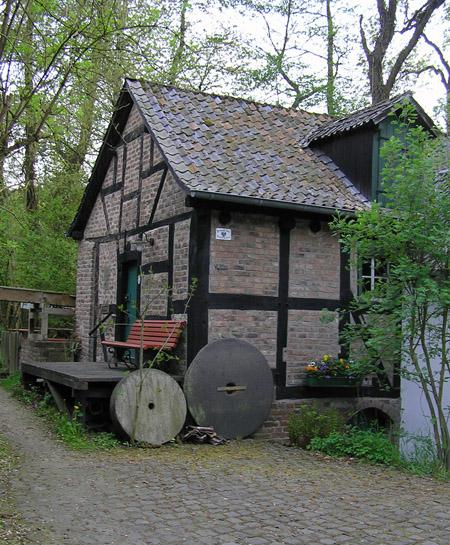
Watermill Holzlar

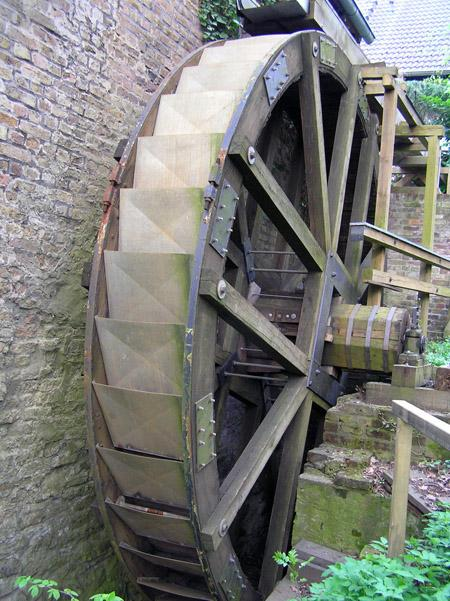
Watermill Holzlar

Holzlar offers a special gem. The watermill of Holzlar. With today's knowledge the watermill is the only functioning historical watermill in the area of Bonn

The watermill is an early industrial cultural relic.

Not much information about its history exists. It is assumed that the mill already existed in companion with a Burghof, which was given to Wilhelm von Nesselrode in 1502 and was destroyed during the war in the 16th century. In the middle of the 19th century, the mill was bought by the family Reuter from the Earl von Nesselrode. The Reuter family was mentioned as the lessee of the mill in the beginning of the 19th century. The mill was closed in the 1950s. In 1989 the “Holzlarer Mühlenverein” was founded. The society bought the mill and restored it. Today the mill is one of Bonns monuments and has historic preservation.

== The old Protestant cemetery ==
The cemetery is located between Hauptstraße and Hövelweg in Holzlar. It has a size of 330 square meters and about 50 graves and is a historic preservation, because it is one of the oldest Protestant cemetery in the Rhineland.

The cemetery was laid out by Family Linder as a private cemetery in the middle of the 17th century. The oldest gravestone has the inscription “M. Linder” and is from 1658. The cemetery is also called “Linders Garten” (garden of Linder). The street name close to the cemetery called Lindershausweg reminds of the family Linder.

In 1819 the cemetery was extended by Leopold Bleibtreu. Today there are 14 gravestones with the inscription “Bleibtreu”.

The cemetery was closed in 1968. It has preservation of sites of historic interest.

== Landscape and rare animals ==
The landscape of Holzlar in the South and East is dominated by forest, brooks, lakes and ponds. In the centre of Holzlar there is a nature reserve. The forest Ennert is mainly mixed forest with some very big oaks.

There are a lot of hiking trails, therefore the Ennert is a popular recreational area in the region of Bonn. There are a lot of springs in the Ennert. Some of them are not mapped. The names of the mapped ones are Alaunbach, Ankerbach, Pechsiefen, Holtorfer Bach, and Mühlenbach. Rare species like the fire salamander, the Coronella austriaca, the great spotted woodpecker and the Anguis fragilis live in the forest or in the brooks and ponds. The Ennert is a nature reserve. In the northwestern part of Holzlar there are no forests and lakes and the land is used for agriculture.

== Gallery ==
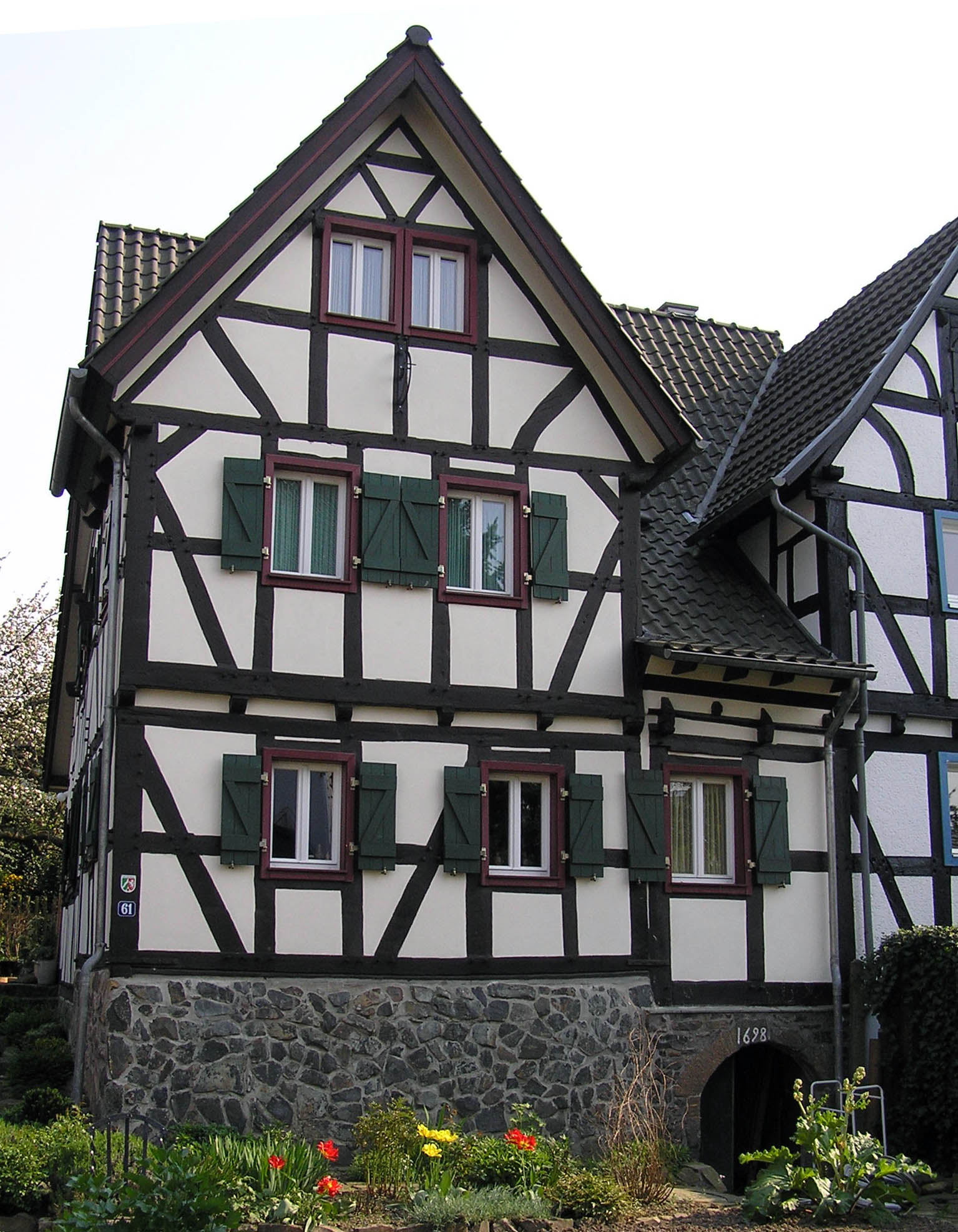
restored house from 1698 in Holzlar

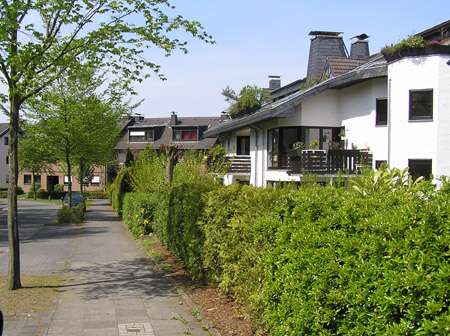
Küppersgarten in Holzlar

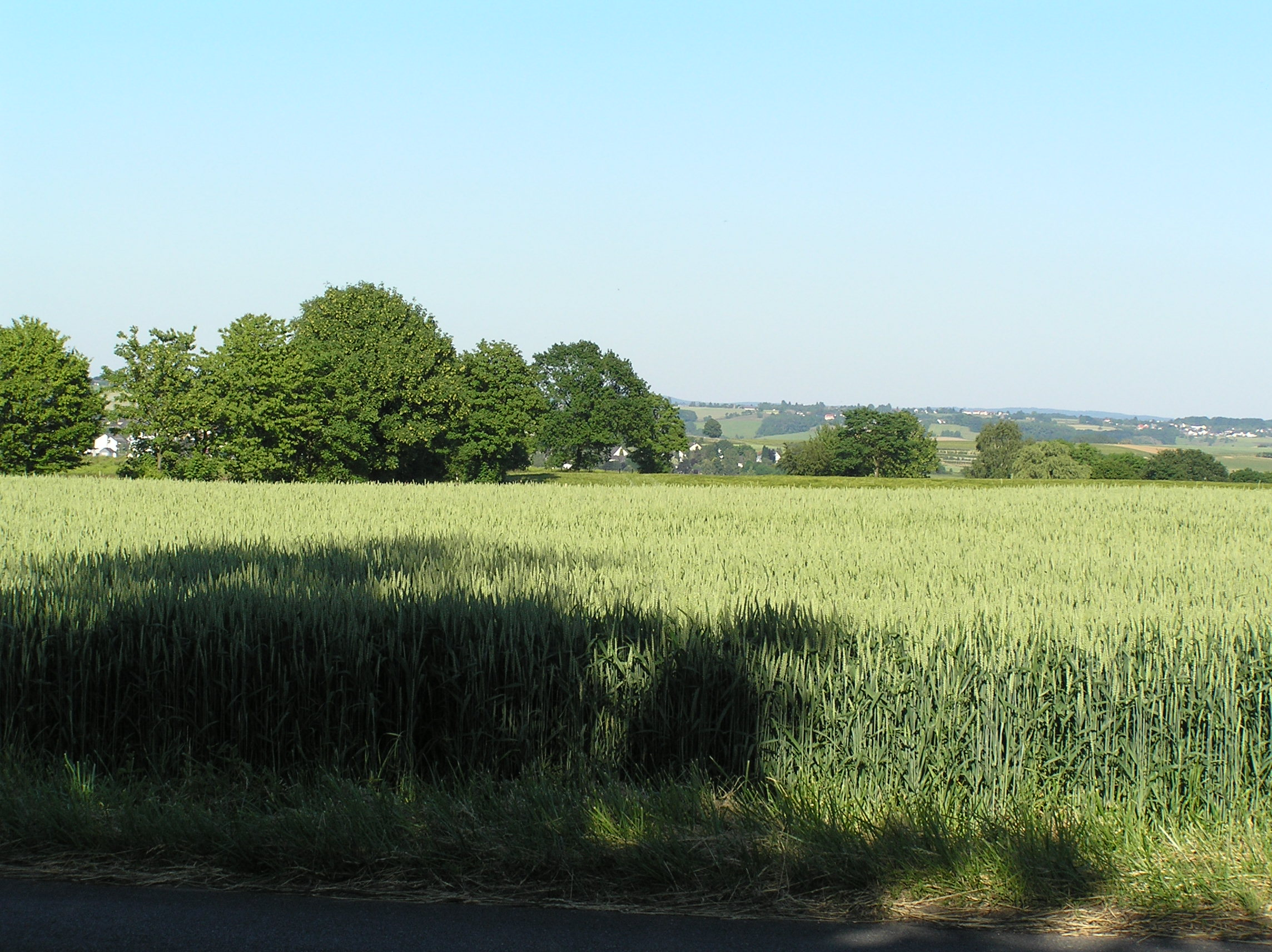
Holzlar-Roleber – view towards south

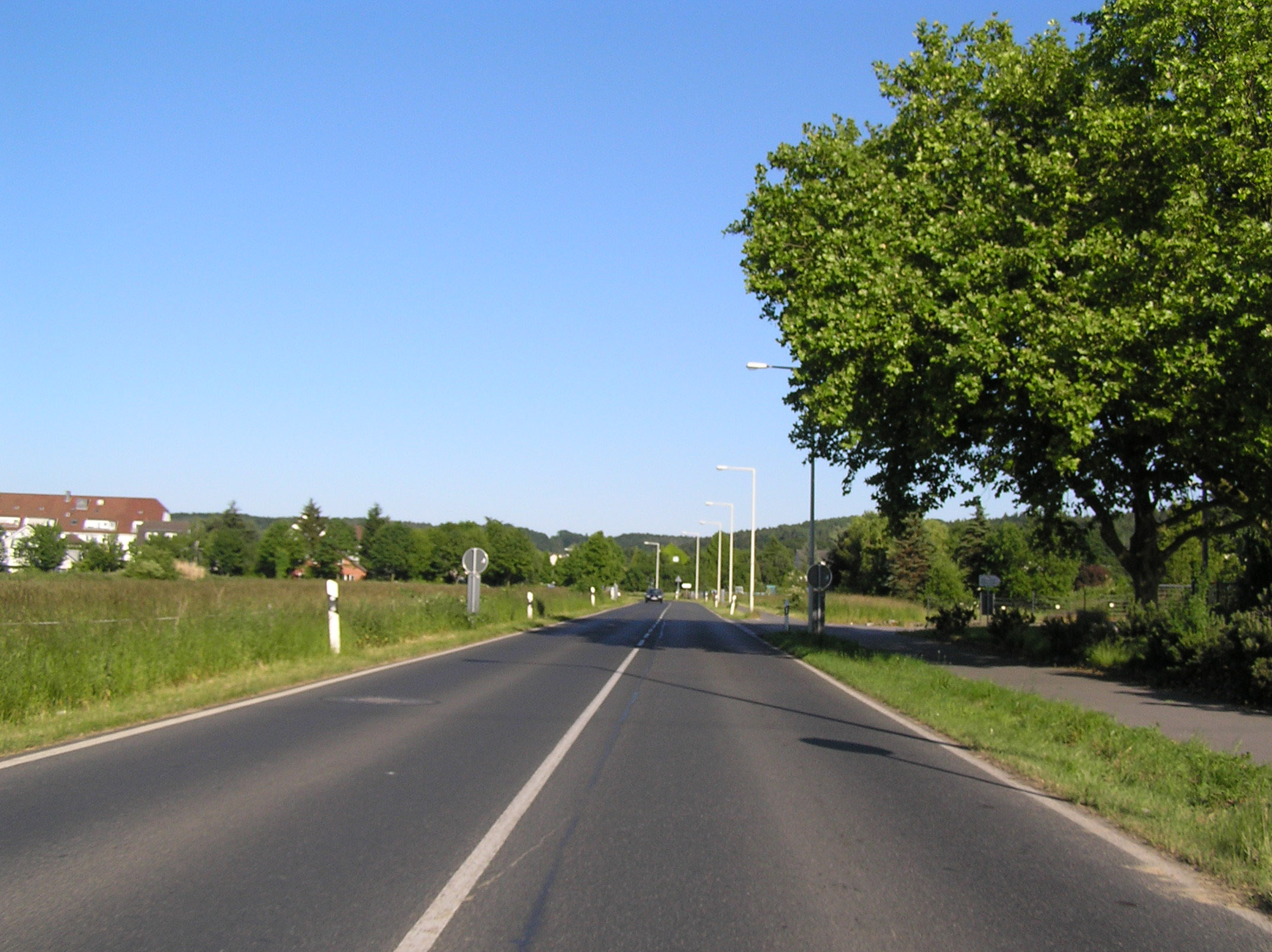
L 83 from Northwest towards Holzlar Hauptstraße

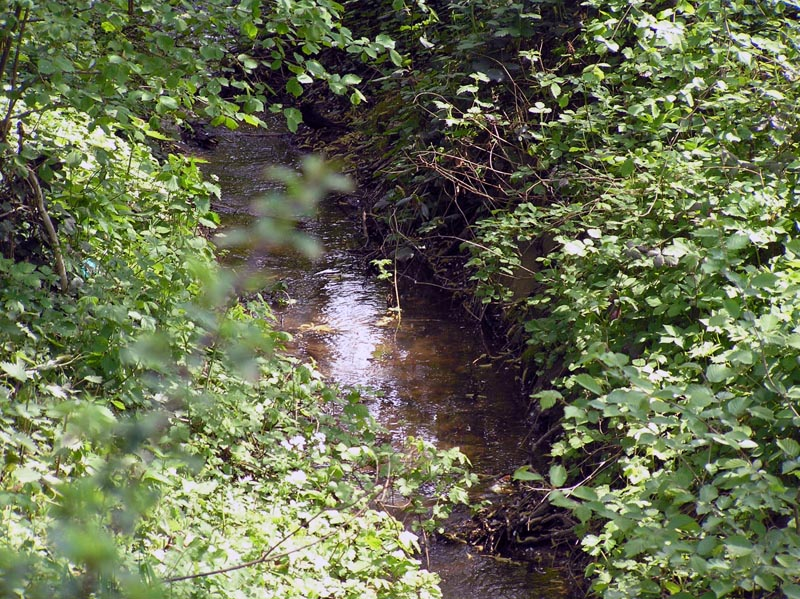
watermill brook in Holzlar

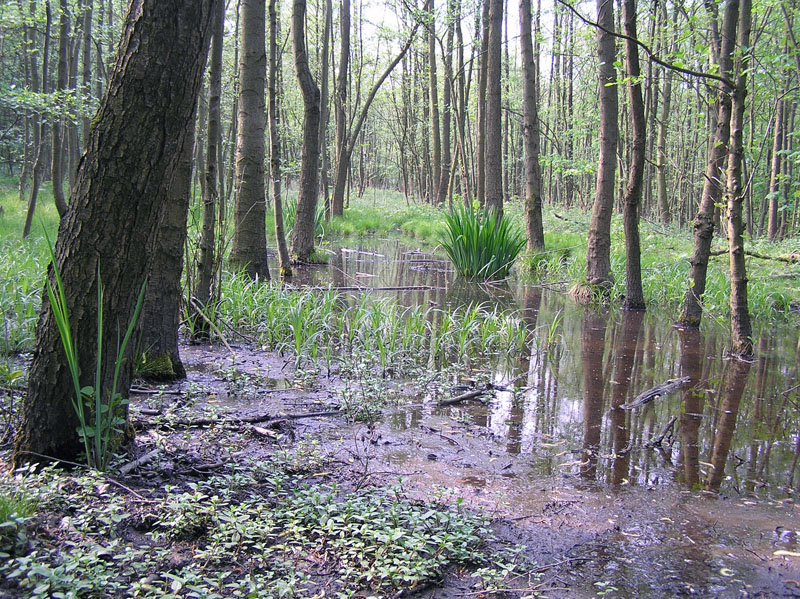
Ennert

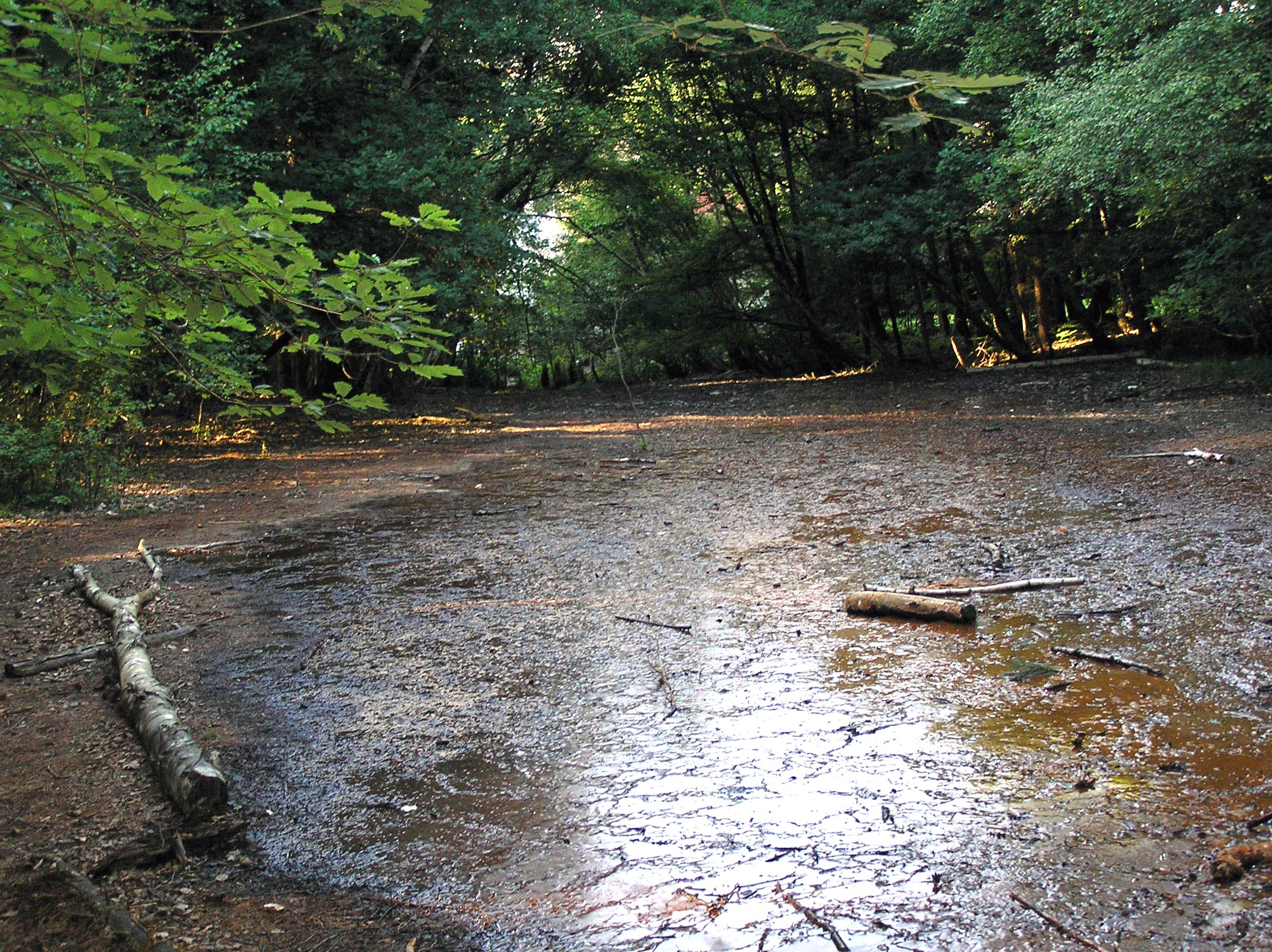
"Red brook“ in the Ennert

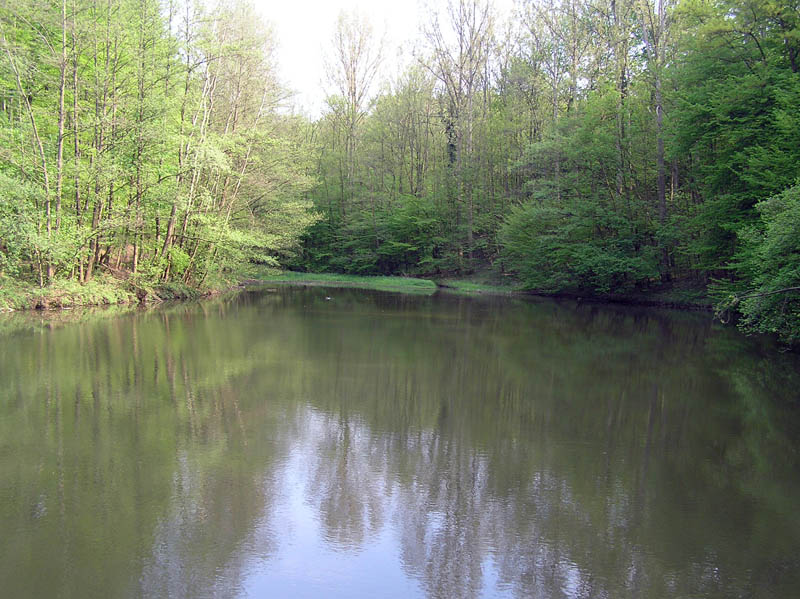
Lake of Holzlar

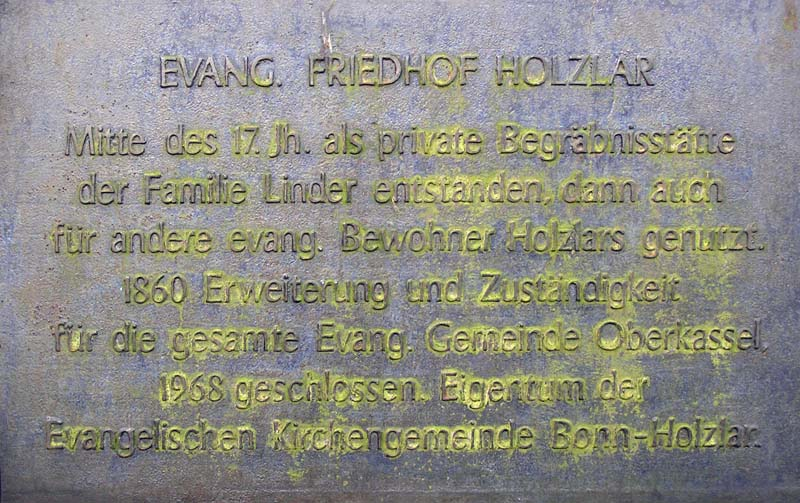
Old Protestant cemetery

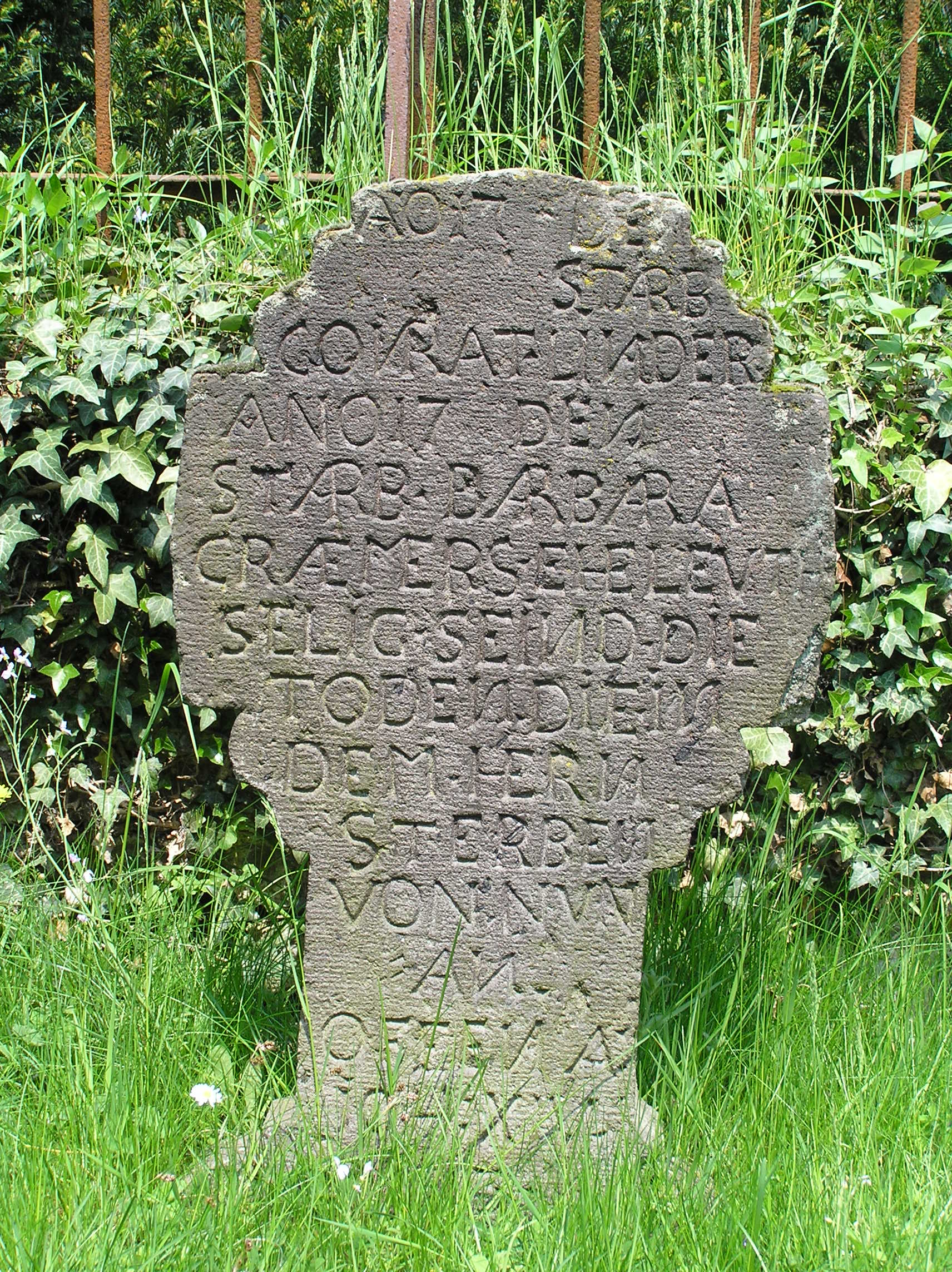
Old Protestant cemetery

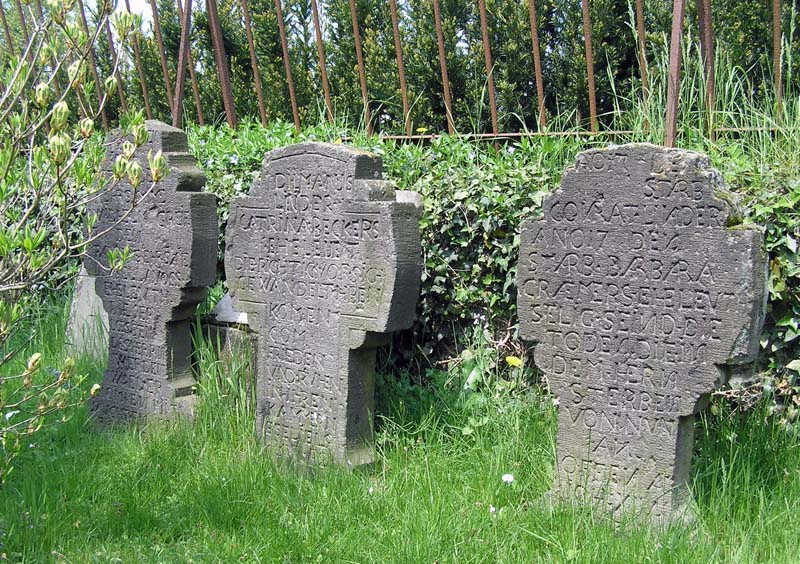
Old Protestant cemetery

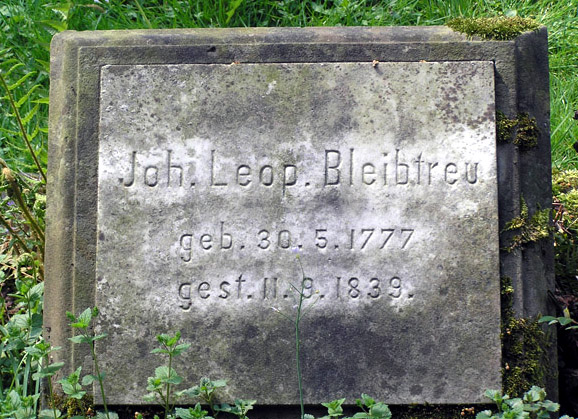
Gravestone of Leopold Bleibtreu
