= Beuel =

Municipal district Stadtbezirk of Bonn.jpg

- Borough of Bonn
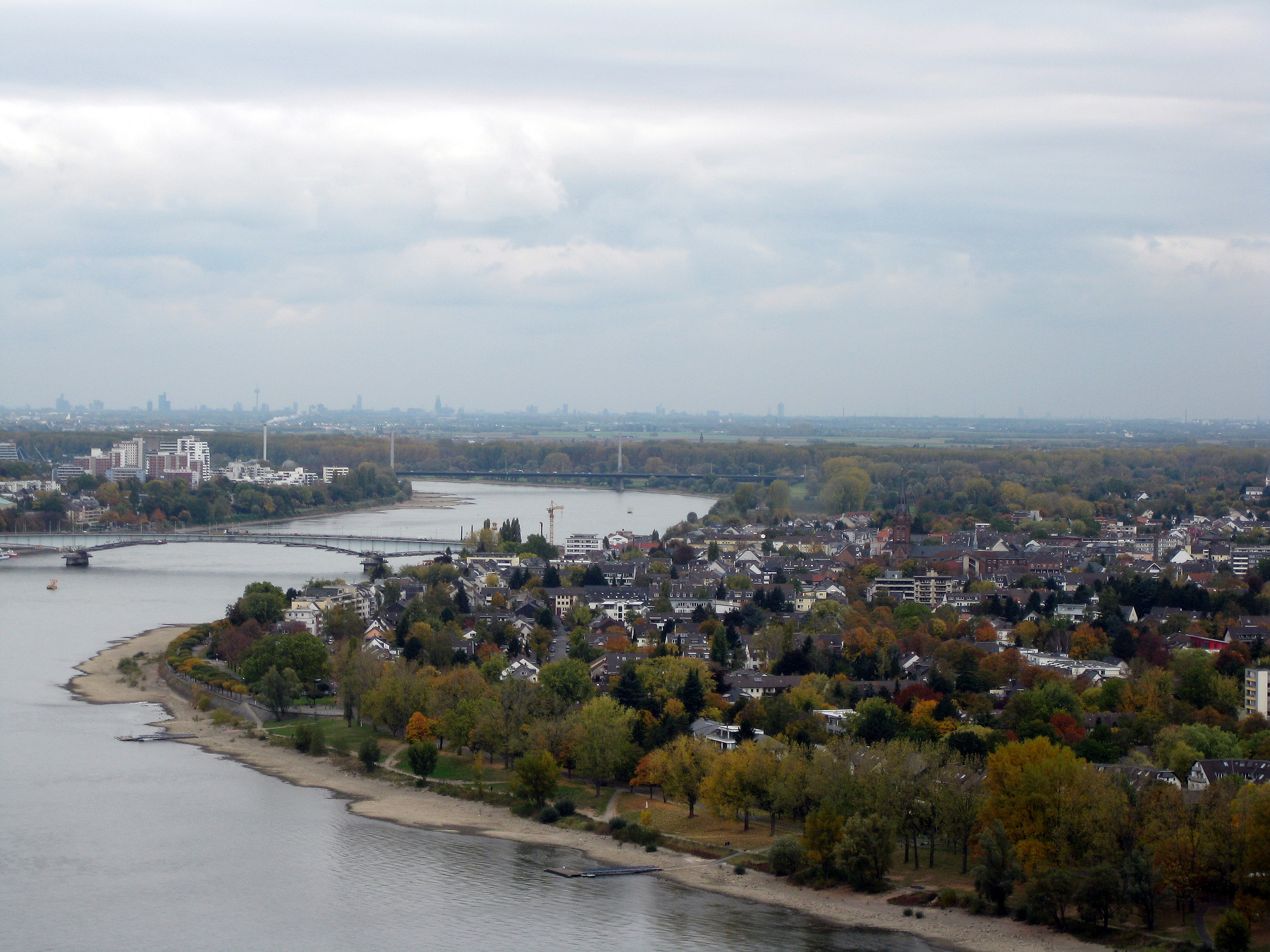
- Beuel on the Rhine riverbank

- Coat of arms

- Beuel within Bonn
- Interactive map of Beuel
- Location within Germany Location within North Rhine-Westphalia
- Coordinates: 50°44′0″N 07°7′20″E
- Country: Germany
- State: North Rhine-Westphalia
- Admin. region: Cologne
- District: Urban district
- City: Bonn

Area
  - Total: 33.2 km^{2} (12.8 sq mi)
- Elevation: 54 m (177 ft)

Population (2020-12-31)
  - Total: 67,827
  - Density: 2,040/km^{2} (5,290/sq mi)
- Time zone: UTC+01:00 (CET)
  - Summer (DST): UTC+02:00 (CEST)
- Dialling codes: 0228
- Vehicle registration: BN

Beuel (Ripuarian: Büel) is a city borough (Stadtbezirk) of Bonn, Germany. It has a population of 67,827 (2020).

== Subdivisions ==
Beuel is composed of the sub-districts Beuel-Mitte, Beuel-Ost, Geislar, Hoholz, Holtorf, Holzlar, Küdinghoven, Limperich, Oberkassel, Pützchen/Bechlinghoven, Ramersdorf, Schwarzrheindorf/Vilich-Rheindorf, Vilich and Vilich-Müldorf.

== Twin towns – sister cities ==
Beuel is twinned with:

- Mirecourt, France (1969)
