= Mederer =

German candy manufacturer

Mederer GmbH
- Company type: GmbH & Co. KG
- Industry: Confectionery
- Founder: Willibald "Willi" Mederer
- Headquarters: Fürth, Germany
- Area served: Worldwide
- Key people: Herbert Mederer; CEO (1981-Present)
- Products: Produced by Trolli, Efrutti, Gummi Bear Factory: Gummi Candy, Marshmallows, Liquorice
- Number of employees: 2´500 (2010)

Mederer GmbH is the fourth largest manufacturer of gummi candy in Germany behind Haribo, Storck and Katjes. Mederer´s most popular brand is Trolli, a brand launched in 1975. Mederer GmbH also owns several other brands, notably Efrutti, Sugarland and Gummi Bear Factory.

The company was founded in 1948.

Altogether, these brands produce gummi candy, licorice and marshmallows in more than one hundred shapes, sizes, and flavours.

Mederer employs roughly 2500 people in factories and offices located in Germany, China, Spain, Czech Republic, United States.
