= List of Xbox Wireless Controller special editions =

This is a list of all the special editions of the Xbox Wireless Controller, the primary controller of the Xbox One and Xbox Series X and Series S home video game consoles. Besides standard colors, "special" and "limited edition" Xbox Wireless Controllers have also been sold by Microsoft with special color and design schemes, sometimes tying into specific games.

== List ==
=== Xbox One era ===
List of Xbox One controller variants
Name or Game	Image	Release	Based on	Notes / Description	Ref.
==== Commemorative / Limited Editions ====
Prototype / "Razzle"		before Nov 2013	Model 1537	Inspired by dazzle camouflage; special prototype shipped to developers before release to ensure compatibility with new console.	
Day One		Nov 22, 2013	Model 1537	Bore the inscription "DAY ONE 2013", bundled with limited "Day One Edition" Xbox One consoles at launch in November 2013, which were intended for those who pre-ordered the console.	
Launch Team		Nov 22, 2013	Model 1537	Given exclusively to Microsoft employees on the release of Xbox One; inscribed with "I MADE THIS LAUNCH TEAM 2013".	
China Day One		Sep 23, 2014	Model 1537	Bore the inscription "CHINA DAY ONE", bundled with limited edition Xbox One at launch in September 2014.	
"Team Amsterdam" / Harlequin		Jun 13, 2016	Model 1708	Designed by Monique Chatterjee and provided to every Xbox core team employee; featured all 15 available colors at that service's launch. Unlike typical XDL controllers, the thumbsticks and triggers are different colors. Front: Lightning Yellow, engraved "TEAM AMSTERDAM"; left stick: Photon Blue; right stick: Deep Pink: D-pad: Regal Purple; view/menu: Grey on white; A/B/X/Y: color on black/grey on black/white on black/black on grey; back: Electric Green; right grip: Pink; left grip: Zest Orange; battery cover: Abyss Black; bumper: Glacier Blue; left trigger: Oxide Red; right trigger; Retro Pink.	
Pizza Hut		Nov 7, 2016	Model 1708	Pizza Hut offered "The Triple Treat Box Instant Win and Sweepstakes" from November 7 to December 24, 2016. Candidates entered a code for a chance to win one of 1,140 prizes consisting of an Xbox One S console and controller bundled with an additional special edition gloss red Xbox One S controller featuring the Pizza Hut logo. One additional grand prize winner was also drawn at random to win a 4K television and an audio system in addition to the Xbox One S console.	
Project Scorpio		Nov 7, 2017	Model 1708	Packed in with pre-ordered Xbox One X consoles; includes stylized "PROJECT SCORPIO" text printed in green on the controllers, running vertically between the d-pad and right thumbstick.	
DPM X019		Nov 14, 2019	Model 1708	"Aquabrush print" collaboration with maharishi's DPM Studio, grey/white with green highlights and D-pad.	
The Mandalorian		Dec 31, 2020	Model 1708	"Beskar steel" patterning	
==== Game-specific ====
Titanfall		Mar 11, 2014	Model 1537	White, black and orange design that was inspired by the in-game R-101C carbine, and also accompanied by a similarly styled console given to Respawn Entertainment employees.	
Sunset Overdrive		Oct 28, 2014	Model 1537	White controller, packed in with limited-edition console and game bundle.	
Call of Duty: Advanced Warfare		Nov 4, 2014	Model 1537	Inspired by the aesthetics of the in-game Sentinel Task Force, featuring its emblem, with monochrome lettering on the face buttons (colored dots indicate the face button colors), a gold-colored D-pad, and gold, silver, and grey accents.	
Forza Motorsport 6		Sep 15, 2015	Model 1697	Accompanied a limited edition of the console, to coincide with the game's launch. The controller is colored in dark blue with a "racing stripe" pattern down the centre, similarly to its corresponding special console.	
Forza Motorsport 6		Jun 12, 2015	Model 1697	Three controllers commemorate the Ford Shelby Daytona (1964, colored "Viking Blue", Chassis CSX2299), GT40 Mark II (1966, black), and Mark IV (1967, red). These controllers were displayed at Le Mans (June 12–14, 2015), E3 2015, and Gamescom 2015. They are now in the Petersen Automotive Museum.	
Forza Motorsport 6		Nov 3, 2015	Model 1698	A concept "Liquid Blue" edition of the Elite controller based upon the Ford GT, including redesigned thumb sticks, carbon fiber highlights, and trigger buttons inspired by the vehicle, was also presented by Microsoft in collaboration with Ford Motor Company. It was displayed at SEMA 2015 before moving to the Petersen Automotive Museum.	
Halo 5: Guardians		Oct 27, 2015	Model 1697	"The Master Chief" features a military green color scheme with a gold "chrome" d-pad and triggers, inspired by the armor design of Master Chief. Both "Chief" and "Locke" feature monochromatic face buttons, etched detailing and texture effects, and are bundled with codes to unlock in-game customization items in Halo 5.	
Halo 5: Guardians		Oct 27, 2015	Model 1697	"Spartan Locke" features a silver color scheme with a blue "chrome" d-pad and accents, inspired by the armor design of Spartan Locke.	
Gears of War 4		Oct 11, 2016	Model 1708	Red "Crimson Omen". All three variants came with redeemable codes for in-game content.	
Gears of War 4		Oct 11, 2016	Model 1708	Grey/blue "JD Fenix"	
Gears of War 4		Oct 11, 2016	Model 1698	Dark red "Elite". Includes matching accessory thumbsticks and rear paddles, which were also available separately for the regular Elite controller.	
Minecraft		Sep 12, 2017	Model 1708	"Creeper" controller was available separately or packed in an Xbox One S bundle with the game.	
Minecraft		Sep 12, 2017	Model 1708	"Pig" and "Creeper" controllers both utilize a blocky font for the face buttons reminiscent of the game's visual style.	
Forza Motorsport 7		Oct 7, 2017	Model 1698	'Elite' Series 1 controller customized by SCUF Gaming with a basic theme for Porsche 911 GT2 RS. Silver face with red and black stripes and matching thumbstick and face (A/B/X/Y) buttons; side grips were covered in Alcantara. Production was limited to 2,500 examples, of which 500 were bundled with a scale model car.	
Sea of Thieves		Feb 6, 2018	Model 1708	Purple finish with aqua accents and a glow-in-the-dark skull print. The right trigger is gold.	
Battlefield V (aka Gold Rush)		Oct 16, 2018	Model 1708	Matte black finish, with monochromatic face buttons (A/B/X/Y). Packed with special edition Xbox One X console with gold gradient finish.	
PlayerUnknown's Battleground		Oct 30, 2018	Model 1708	Released via the Microsoft store. It features a black digital camouflage design coinciding with the game. On the front, it has a laser scratch-like chrome D-pad, a blue circle surrounding the left analog stick, grips on the back triggers with a red 'X' on the back of the right trigger, and the 'PUBG' logo on the back battery cover.	
Gears of War 5		Aug 20, 2019	Model 1708	"Kait Diaz" snow-weathered finish; available separately or bundled with limited edition Xbox One X.	
NBA 2K20		Sep 6, 2019	Model 1708	Purple labeling for face buttons and D-pad with cyan and magenta flecks to match bundled limited edition "Hyperspace" Xbox One X.	
Fortnite		Sep 17, 2019	Model 1708	Monochromatic dark purple; bundled with 500 V-Bucks.	
Madden NFL 20		Jan 31, 2020	Model 1708	Packed in with custom Xbox One X themed for Madden NFL 20; controllers are primarily white with blue or red accents.	
Cyberpunk 2077		Apr 20, 2020	Model 1708	Partnership between CD Projekt RED and Microsoft, features three colour design, with visible factory scuff marks all over the controller, a Samurai logo on the battery cover and QR Code on the bottom back of the unit with Hashtag "#2077".	
==== Forces / Camouflage ====
Armed Forces / Camouflage		Oct 2014	Model 1537	Geometric camouflage pattern, and optionally bundled with a matching stereo headset. Predominantly green.	
Midnight Forces		Sep 2014	Model 1537	Predominantly blue geometric camouflage pattern, exclusive to Best Buy.	
Covert Forces		Jun 16, 2015	Model 1697	Predominantly grey/black geometric camouflage pattern; now includes 3.5mm headset jack.	
Armed Forces (3.5mm)		Nov 23, 2015	Model 1697	Reissue of green geometric camouflage pattern with new controller model.	
Winter Forces		Feb 7, 2017	Model 1708	Predominantly grey/white geometric camouflage pattern with new controller model.	
Armed Forces II		Aug 14, 2018	Model 1708	Predominantly green geometric camouflage pattern. Exclusive to Wal-Mart in the US.	
Midnight Forces II		Sep 10, 2019	Model 1708	Predominantly blue geometric camouflage pattern.	
Night Ops Camo		Oct 8, 2019	Model 1708	Grey/black, opaque; new curved camouflage pattern (prior 'Forces' series had polygonal camouflage)	
Arctic Camo		May 2020	Model 1708	Grey/white, partially transparent; exclusive to Microsoft Store and Wal-Mart.	
==== Special colors ====
Lunar White		Sep 22, 2015	Model 1697	White body, gold-colored "chrome" d-pad and triggers, and monochromatic face buttons.	
Blue		Sep 27, 2016	Model 1708	Two-tone blue, Microsoft Store and timed exclusive to Best Buy.	
Military Green		Oct 18, 2016	Model 1708	Monochromatic olive drab, packed with matching console and Battlefield 1.	
Storm Grey		Nov 1, 2016	Model 1708	Monochromatic grey, packed with matching console and Battlefield 1, exclusive to Wal-Mart in the US.	
Deep Blue		Nov 1, 2016	Model 1708	Monochromatic blue, packed with matching console. Packed with FIFA 17 (exclusive to Argos in UK), Battlefield 1 (exclusive to GAME in UK), or Gears of War 4 (UK)	
Red		Jan 10, 2017	Model 1708	Two-tone red: lighter red for front and face button lettering, darker red for back and face button backgrounds. Exclusive to Microsoft Store and GameStop.	
Green / Orange		Jan 24, 2017	Model 1708	Two-tone olive drab green (lighter green front, darker green back) with neon orange highlights on thumbstick shafts. Exclusive to Microsoft Store and Wal-Mart.	
Grey / Green		Aug 3, 2017	Model 1708	Two-tone gray, with neon green highlights on thumbstick shafts.	
Grey / Blue		Sep 11, 2018	Model 1708	Dark and light gray, with blue highlights on thumbstick shafts and underside of controller.	
==== Shadow / Phantom (gradients) ====
Copper Shadow		Mar 2016	Model 1697	Copper metallic color scheme with a gradient effect that fades to black. Exclusive to GameStop and Microsoft Store.	
Dusk Shadow		Mar 2016	Model 1697	Blue metallic color scheme with a gradient effect that fades to black. Exclusive to Best Buy and Microsoft Store.	
Dawn Shadow		Oct 4, 2016	Model 1708	Magenta metallic color scheme with a gradient effect that fades to black.	
Ocean Shadow		Feb 7, 2017	Model 1708	Light blue metallic color scheme with a gradient effect that fades to black.	
Volcano Shadow		Aug 3, 2017	Model 1708	Red metallic color scheme with a gradient effect that fades to black.	
Phantom Black		Sep 11, 2018	Model 1708	Alpha gradient from translucent black to opaque champagne color.	
Phantom White		Apr 2, 2019	Model 1708	Alpha gradient from translucent to opaque white color.	
Phantom Magenta		Mar 17, 2020	Model 1708	Alpha gradient from translucent to opaque magenta color.	
==== Tech / Sport (grips) ====
Recon Tech		Apr 25, 2017	Model 1708	Warm grey with laser-etched diamond "grip" palm panels and gold, futuristic military-inspired accents.	
Patrol Tech		Sep 5, 2017	Model 1708	Dark blue with diamond "grip" palm panels.	
Combat Tech		Mar 27, 2018	Model 1708	Olive drab with diamond "grip" palm panels.	
Sport Red		Mar 1, 2019	Model 1708	Red with diamond "grip" palm panels.	
Sport White		Jul 31, 2019	Model 1708	White with diamond "grip" palm panels.	
Sport Blue		Sep 17, 2019	Model 1708	Blue with diamond "grip" palm panels.	

=== Xbox Series X and Series S era ===
List of Xbox Series controller variants
Name or Game	Image	Release	Based on	Notes / Description	Ref.
==== Special colors ====
Robot White		Nov 10, 2020	Model 1914	Bundled with Xbox Series S and Series X.	
Shock Blue		Nov 10, 2020	Model 1914	Blue front and white back.	
Pulse Red	An Xbox Pulse Red controller	Feb 9, 2021	Model 1914	Red front and white back. Early release in China.	
Electric Volt		Apr 27, 2021	Model 1914	Fluorescent yellow front and white back. First use of post-consumer recycled materials in Xbox hardware.	
Deep Pink		May 4, 2022	Model 1914	Pink front and white back.	
Velocity Green		Mar 7, 2023	Model 1914	Fluorescent green front and white back.	
Remix Special Edition	An Xbox Wireless controller in the Remix Special Edition variant.	Apr 18, 2023	Model 1914	Olive green front with blue-green back. Tan grips and fluorescent yellow triggers and bumpers that include a topographic texture pattern. Comes with Xbox Rechargeable Battery Kit inside the box. Is made partly out of recycled plastics including older Xbox One model controllers.	
Astral Purple		Sep 12, 2023	Model 1914	Purple front and white back.	
Gold Shadow		Oct 3, 2023	Model 1914	Predominantly metallic/iridescent gold, fading to carbon black, similar to "Lunar Shift" controller, but without "marble grip" rubberized side panels.	
==== Commemorative / Limited Editions ====
Project Scarlett		Nov 10, 2020	Model 1914	Primarily white, with black and green graphics printed on the controller face. "Project Scarlett" printed below D-pad and right thumbstick. Face buttons are labeled in green. "Scarlett Launch Team" logo & graphic printed on battery compartment door. Provided to Project Scarlett (Xbox Series X) development team.	
The Mandalorian		Dec 17, 2020	Model 1914	Printed image showing The Child (Grogu) wielding the Force; special "Tatooine tangerine" color. Limited edition of one, presented as part of a set of two controllers as a sweepstakes prize.	
The Mandalorian		Dec 17, 2020	Model 1914	Printed image showing profile of The Mandalorian (Din Djarin); special "Tython turquoise" color. Limited edition of one, presented as part of a set of two controllers as a sweepstakes prize.	
Canadian Tuxedo		Jan 15, 2021	Model 1914	Single example with denim covering, including belt loops and small pockets.	
Pride		Jun 1, 2021	Model 1914	Limited edition provided by Microsoft to key influencers and media. Not sold. A modified version of the Pride design was added to the Xbox Design Lab in June 2022.	
Space Jam: A New Legacy		Jul 8, 2021	Model 1914	"Tune Squad": printed words "Tune Squad" superimposed over a blue background with orange rings; the orange rings are meant to be reminiscent of the Looney Tunes marquee.	
Space Jam: A New Legacy		Jul 8, 2021	Model 1914	"Serververse": aqua-colored line graphics on a black background, with the Warner Brothers shield above the share button.	
Space Jam: A New Legacy		Jul 8, 2021	Model 1914	"Goon Squad": gray printed circuit traces on a purple background, with the printed words "Goon Squad" in black.	
Space Jam: A New Legacy		Jul 15, 2021	Model 1914	"Road Runner vs Wile E. Coyote": limited edition, bundled exclusively with Nike LeBron 18 Low sneakers. Depicts "a "chaotic scene with dust clouds of the Road Runner settling as he speeds across the controller" and features the ACME logo on the D-pad.	
20th Anniversary		Nov 15, 2021	Model 1914	Translucent black shell with neon green accents, including Xbox button, D-pad spring, and rear grip panels.	
Trolli		Apr 7, 2022	Model 1914	Pink and blue, with a characteristic gummy worm print. Awarded as part of a custom-colored Xbox Series S bundle, the sole grand prize of a sweepstakes held from Sep 1, 2021 to Mar 31, 2022.	
Sonic the Hedgehog 2		Apr 30, 2022	Model 1914	Blue and red controllers themed for Sonic and Knuckles, respectively, with long fur trim, packed in with a custom Sonic 2-themed Xbox Series S as a sweepstakes prize. The console includes an additional customized controller with a Sonic 2 theme.	
Sunkissed Vibes OPI		May 1, 2023	Model 1914	Pastel colors inspired by the palette of colors in the OPI Products Summer Make the Rules nail polish collection; melon-colored body (light orange) with pastel blue back, bumpers, and thumbsticks, black on white buttons, lime green triggers, and orange D-pad.	
==== Game-specific ====
Forza Horizon 5		Nov 9, 2021	Model 1914	Limited edition controller with a translucent yellow face, white back and top (including bumpers but excluding triggers), and bottom grips textured to resemble a perforated leather-covered steering wheel. Features neon pink and blue accents (including a blue right trigger and left thumbstick top, and a pink left trigger and right thumbstick top), a pearlescent light pink D-pad, a splatter print across the front, a Forza logo print on the front of the left grip, a red-accented left rumble motor (colored to resemble a brake caliper), and a pearlescent light pink Horizon Festival 'H' logo on the battery cover. The controller's package came with a DLC code to unlock an in-game specially designed 1932 Ford De Luxe, as well as an exclusive in-game T-shirt and emote for the player's avatar. Razer Inc. also released an officially licensed quick charge controller stand to go along with this controller.	
Halo Infinite		Nov 15, 2021	Model 1914	"Pack-In": exclusively bundled with matching Xbox Series X. Predominantly dark gray metallic "panel" effect and "iridium gold" accents, including a 20-year anniversary mark on the back of the controller.	
Halo Infinite		Nov 15, 2021	Model 1797	"Elite Series 2 - Halo Infinite Limited Edition": Elite Series 2 in predominantly metallic green, with "iridium gold"-colored D-pads and settings indicators that light up in blue.	
Starfield		Jun 11, 2023	Model 1914		
Forza Horizon 6		May 19, 2026	Model 1914		
==== Camouflage ====
Daystrike Camo		May 4, 2021	Model 1914	Camouflage pattern like prior Night Ops (2019) and Arctic Camo (2020) controllers, executed in dark red, grey, and black. Also includes texture on upper bumper surfaces. First use of post-consumer recycled materials in Xbox hardware.	
Mineral Camo		Sep 27, 2022	Model 1914	Rounded camouflage pattern like prior Night Ops (2019), Arctic (2020), and Daystrike (2021) controllers, executed in shades of blue. Also includes texture on upper bumper surfaces.	
Arctic Camo		May 9, 2023	Model 1914	Updated version of prior Arctic Camo (2020) with rounded camouflage pattern, executed in shades of white. Also includes texture on upper bumper surfaces.	
==== Grips ====
Aqua Shift		Aug 31, 2021	Model 1914	Predominantly metallic/iridescent blue, with "marble grip" rubberized side panels featuring a swirling pattern unique to each controller.	
Lunar Shift	An Xbox Wireless controller in the Lunar Shift variant.	Oct 11, 2022	Model 1914	Predominantly metallic/iridescent silver, with "marble grip" rubberized side panels featuring a swirling pattern unique to each controller.	
Stellar Shift	A Stellar Shift Xbox Wireless controller.	Feb 7, 2023	Model 1914	Predominantly metallic/iridescent purple, with "marble grip" rubberized side panels featuring a swirling pattern unique to each controller.	
Stormcloud Vapor		Aug 1, 2023	Model 1914	Marbled pattern in multiple shades of blue on front, with "marble grip" rubberized side panels featuring a swirling pattern unique to each controller.	
