= Yupi (confectioner) =

Indonesian candy products manufacturer

Yupi Indo
- Type: Public (Perseroan terbatas)
- Traded as: IDX: YUPI
- Industry: Confectionery
- Headquarters: Gunung Putri, Bogor, Indonesia
- Area served: Asia, North America, Australia, Europe, Middle East
- Products: Gummies
- Website: www.yupindo.com

PT Yupi Indo Jelly Gum Tbk, better known as Yupi, is an Indonesian gummy jelly manufacturer. Yupi service many markets and private label customers around the world. Starting up with a joint venture with Trolli, one of the leading gummy manufacturers in Europe, Yupi has been the market leader in gummy confectionery product in Indonesia since 1996 and the largest player in South East Asia, according to its website.

== Products ==
- Strawberry Kiss
- Iced Cola
- Jungle Fun
- Dino Land
- Sea World
- Fang
- Lips
- Burger
- Hot Dog
- Pizza
- Sweet Heart
- Fruit Cocktail
- Aquarium
- Mummy
- Phyton
- Neon Stix
- Baby Bears
- Little Star
- Fun Gum
- Apple Ring
- Peach Ring
- Milly Moos
- Lunch
- Seasonal, as valentine Imlek and Lebaran
- Mango
- Roletto
- Baby Bears

== See also ==
- Trolli, a German-based gummie brand owned by Mederer Corporation.
