= Hans Riegel =

German entrepreneur (1923–2013)

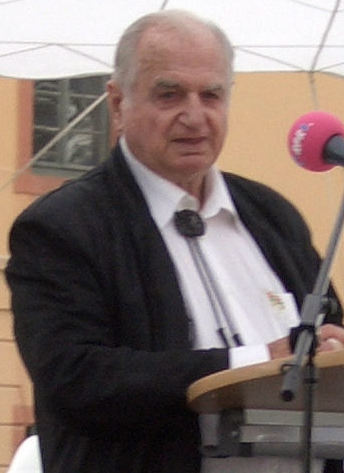
- Riegel in 2005
- Born: Johannes Peter Riegel; 10 March 1923; Bonn, Germany
- Died: 15 October 2013 (aged 90); Bonn, Germany
- Occupation: Entrepreneur
- Years active: 1946–2013
- Known for: Owner and operator of Haribo

Johannes Peter "Hans" Riegel, also known as Hans Riegel Jr. (10 March 1923 – 15 October 2013), was a German entrepreneur who owned and operated the confectioner Haribo since 1946.

== Biography ==
Born in Bonn, Riegel was the oldest son of the company's founder Hans Riegel Sr., who invented the gummy bear in 1922. The name of the company, Haribo, comes from the first two letters of his name and where he was from (HANS RIEGEL BONN). Riegel was captured and held as an Allied prisoner-of-war during World War II. Upon his release, Riegel returned to Bonn, and, along with his brother Paul, assumed leadership of Haribo in 1946. After his graduation from the Jesuit boarding school Aloisiuskolleg, he did his doctorate in 1951 at Bonn University with his thesis "The development of the world sugar industry during and after the Second World War".

In 1953, Riegel was elected first president of the German badminton association (Deutscher Badminton-Verband) after he had won the German championship in the men's doubles. In 1954 and 1955 he won the mixed doubles title. In the same year, he organized the construction of the first indoor badminton court in Germany, called the Haribo-Centre, in Bonn.

Riegel owned the Jakobsburg Hotel and Golf resort near Boppard in the Rhine Valley in Germany. He died in Bonn Germany in 2013 at 90.
