= Yupi (disambiguation) =

Yupi may refer to:

- Yupi, an Internet portal founded in 1997
- Yupi (confectioner), an Indonesian gummy lolly manufacturer
- Yupi Tartars, an old name for the Nanai people and related ethnic groups of the Amur River basin
