= Gummy bear =

Fruit gum candy

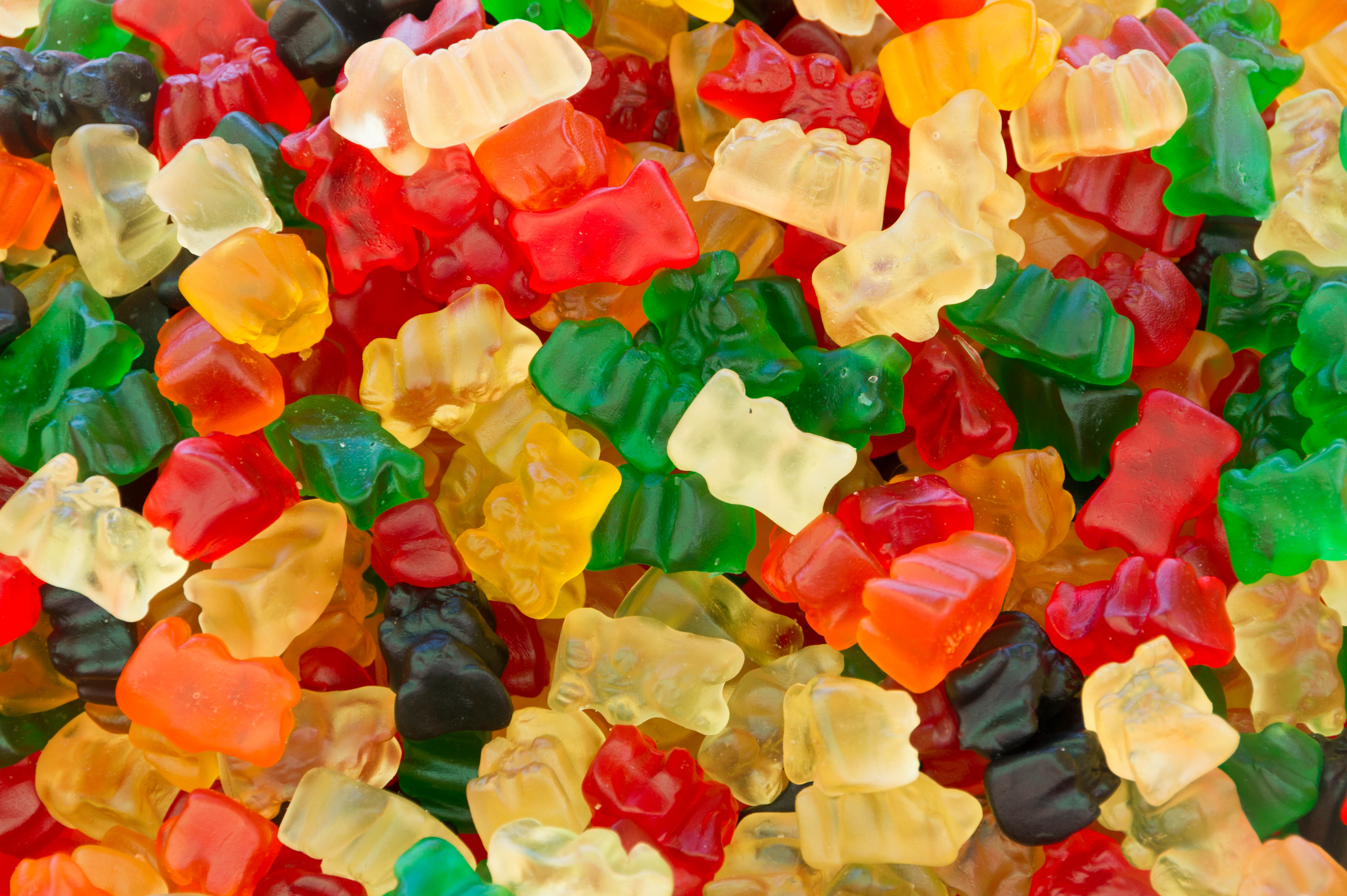
- Gummy bears produced by Haribo, the first company to manufacture gummy bears
- Type: Gummy candy
- Place of origin: Germany
- Created by: Hans Riegel Sr.
- Main ingredients: Gelatin, sugar, glucose syrup, starch, flavoring, food coloring, citric acid

Gummy bears (German: Gummibärchen) are small, fruit gum candies, similar to a jelly baby in some English-speaking countries. The candy is roughly 2 cm (0.8 in) long and shaped in the form of a bear. The gummy bear is one of many gummies, popular gelatin-based candies sold in a variety of shapes and colors by various brands such as Haribo.

== History ==
The gummy bear originated in Germany, where it is popular under the name Gummibär (gummy bear), or in the diminutive form Gummibärchen ([little] gummy bear). Gum arabic was the original base ingredient used to produce the gummy bears, hence the name gum or gummy. Hans Riegel Sr., a confectioner from Bonn, started the Haribo company in 1920.

In 1922, inspired by the trained bears seen at street festivities and markets in Europe through to the 19th century, he invented the Dancing Bear (Tanzbär), a small, affordable, fruit-flavored gum candy treat for children and adults alike, which was much larger in form than its later successor, the Gold-Bear (Goldbär).

Even during Weimar Germany's hyperinflation period that wreaked havoc on the country, Haribo's fruit-gum Dancing Bear treats remained affordably priced for a mere one pfennig per pair at kiosks. The success of the Dancing Bear lead to Haribo's world-famous Gold-Bears candy product in 1967.

== Variations and flavours ==
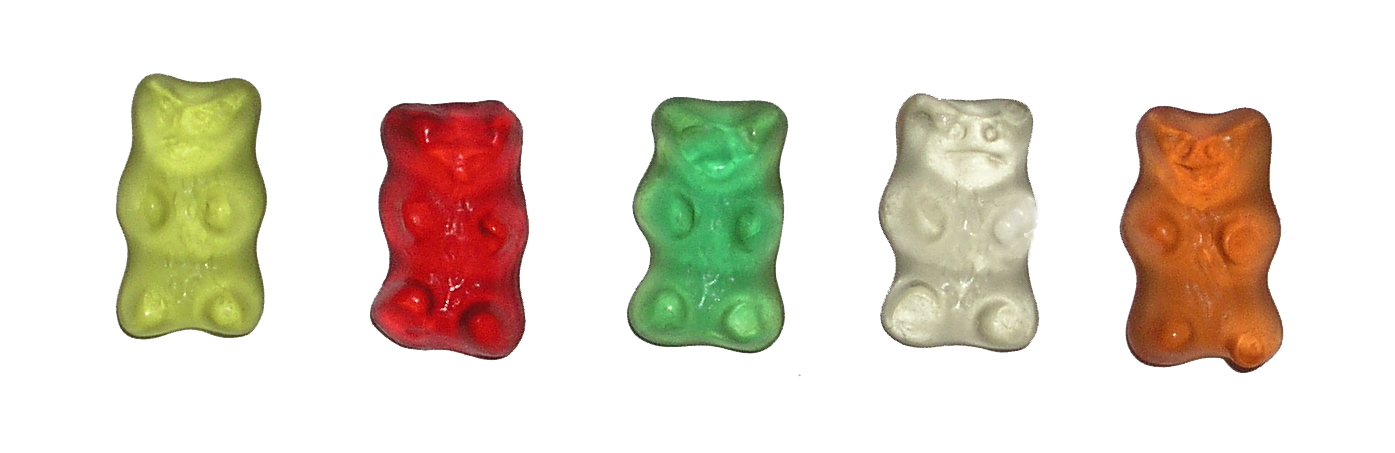
Gummy bears

The success of gummy bears has spawned the production of many other gummy candies made to resemble animals and other objects, such as rings, worms, frogs, snakes, hamburgers, cherries, sharks, penguins, hippos, lobsters, octopuses, apples, peaches, oranges, Ampelmännchen, Smurfs and spiders. Manufacturers offer a range of sizes including bears that weigh several kilograms.

In the United States, Haribo gummy bears are sold in five flavors: raspberry (red); orange (orange); strawberry (green); pineapple (colorless); and lemon (yellow). Trolli's bears are most often sold in five flavors in the United States, and in the same colors. Trolli's red bear is strawberry-flavored, while the green is lime and the colorless is grape.

Many companies emulate Haribo or Trolli flavor-color combinations. Health-oriented brands, which often use all-natural flavors, sometimes opt for more and different flavors. For example, the boxed bulk gummies sold by Sunflower/Newflower Markets include grape, pineapple-coconut and peach, among others.

== Ingredients and production ==
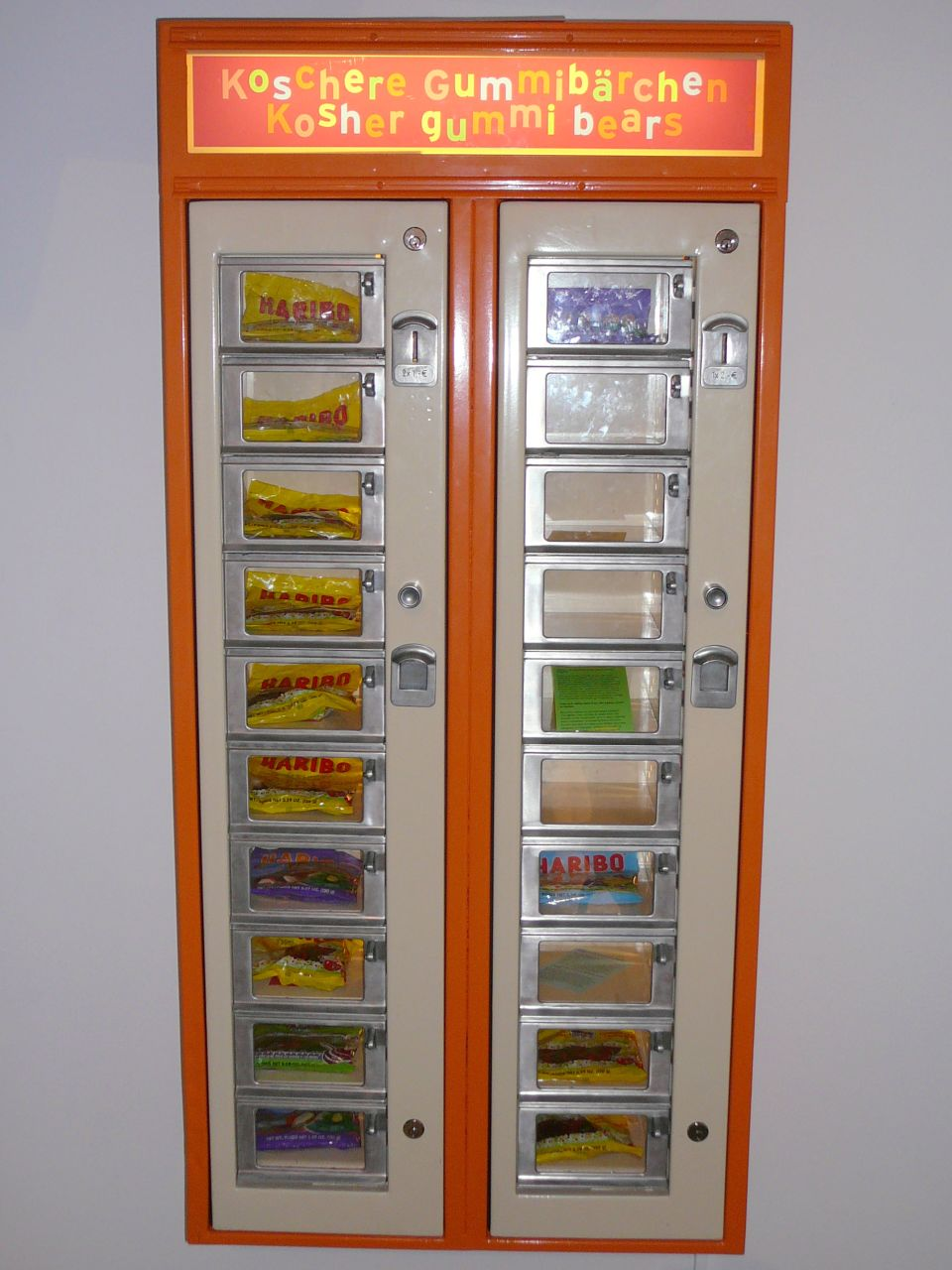
A vending machine for kosher bears at the cafeteria of the Jewish Museum Berlin

The traditional gummy bear is made from a mixture of sugar, glucose syrup, starch, flavoring, food coloring, citric acid and gelatin. Higher quality gummies have gelatin as the lead ingredient. However, recipes vary, such as organic candy, those suitable for vegetarians or those following religious dietary laws.

Production uses a specialized machine called a starch mogul. The image of the gummy bear is stamped into a tray filled with powdered starch. The hot, liquid mixture is poured into the indentations in the starch and allowed to cool overnight. Once the mixture has set, the candies can be removed from the mold and packaged. The molds are open on top, so only the bear's front is formed while the back remains flat. The original design for each type of candy is carved into plaster by an artist, then duplicated by a machine and used to create the starch molds for the production line.

Gummy bears made with bovine, porcine, or fish gelatin are not suitable for vegetarians and vegans. Those containing porcine gelatin or gelatin from animals not slaughtered in keeping with kashrut or halal dietary laws cannot be eaten by observant Jews or Muslims. In its factory in Turkey, Haribo produces halal gummy bears.

Large sour gummy bears are larger and flatter than regular ones, have a softer texture and include fumaric acid or other acid ingredients to produce a sour flavor. Some manufacturers produce sour bears with a different texture based on starch instead of gelatin. Typically, starch produces a shorter (cleaner bite, less chewy) texture than does gelatin.

== Health issues ==
Haribo Goldbear gummy bears
Nutritional value per 100 g (3.5 oz)
- Energy: 1,459 kJ (349 kcal)
- Carbohydrates: 77 g
- Sugars: 46 g
- Fat: 0 g
- Protein: 6.9 g
- ^{†}Percentages estimated using US recommendations for adults.

Gummy bears ordinarily contain mostly empty calories, but recently gummy bears containing vitamin C, produced by manufacturers such as Sconza or Bear Essentials, have been marketed to parents of young children. Gummy supplements containing vitamins have also been produced in the form of gummy bears to motivate consumption by young, picky eaters.

Gummy bears, and other gummy candy, stick to teeth and may cause tooth decay. However, gummy bears containing the cavity-fighting additive xylitol (wood sugar) are now being tested. Trolli has developed its "acti-line" of gummy candy that it claims will help the immune system and teeth.

There has been concern that gelatin in most gummy bears may harbor prions, particularly those that cause bovine spongiform encephalopathy (BSE) in cattle and new-variant Creutzfeldt–Jakob disease in humans. Based on studies, the United States FDA and other national organizations and countries consider the risk of BSE transmission through gelatin to be minuscule as long as precautions are followed during manufacturing.

== Works ==
- I Am Your Gummy Bear
- "I'm a Gummy Bear (The Gummy Bear Song)"
- Disney's Adventures of the Gummi Bears

== See also ==
- Turkish delight
- Albanese Candy, an American brand
