= Kessenich (Bonn) =

- Stadtteil of Bonn
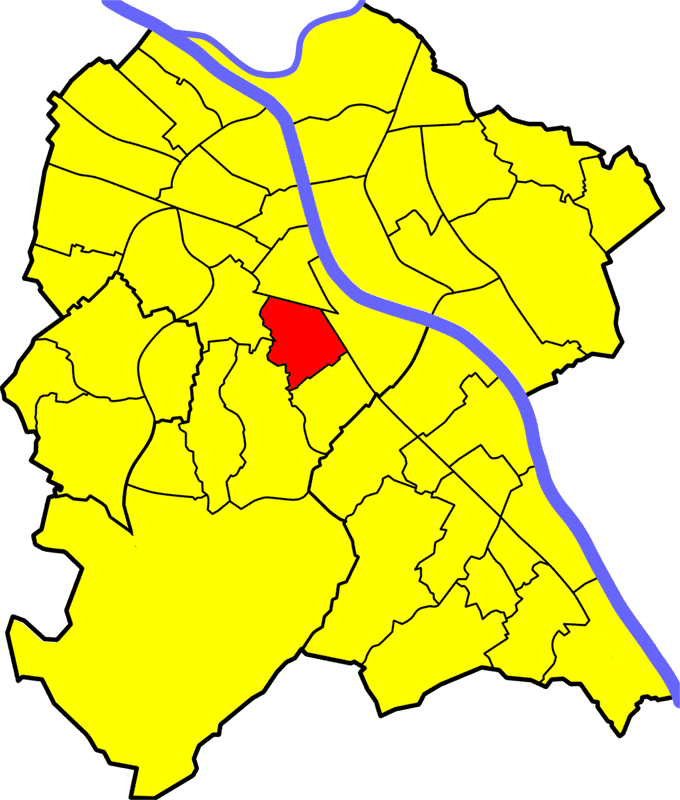
- Location of Kessenich in Bonn
- Interactive map of Kessenich
- Location within Germany Location within North Rhine-Westphalia
- Coordinates: 50°42′45″N 7°6′32″E
- Country: Germany
- State: North Rhine-Westphalia
- Admin. region: Cologne
- District: Urban district
- City: Bonn

Area
  - Total: 2 km^{2} (0.77 sq mi)

Population (2020-12-31)
  - Total: 13,031
  - Density: 6,500/km^{2} (17,000/sq mi)
- Time zone: UTC+01:00 (CET)
  - Summer (DST): UTC+02:00 (CEST)
- Postal codes: 53129
- Dialling codes: 0228
- Vehicle registration: BN

Kessenich is a district of the former German capital city Bonn. It is best known for the German confectionery company Haribo.

== Geography ==
Kessenich is one of the southern districts of the Stadtbezirk Bonn in Bonn, with Venusberg and Poppelsdorf bordering to the west, Gronau to the east, Südstadt to the north and Dottendorf to the south. It is connected with the inner city (Bonn-Zentrum) and Bonn central station by tramlines 61 and 62. The railway station Bonn UN Campus is located on the border between Kessenich and the district of Gronau.

== History ==
Kessenich is one of the oldest districts of today's Bonn. The first documented mention dates from the ninth century. In the 15th century it was the largest village of the Amt Bonn. Kessenich was incorporated into Bonn in 1904.

When Bonn was the capital of West Germany the Rosenburg in Kessenich was the location of the German Ministry of Justice.

== Haribo ==
The confectionery company Haribo was founded in 1920 in Kessenich by Hans Riegel. The first production site was in the Bergstraße. In April 2019 Haribo moved its headquarters to Grafschaft.
