= Gummy candy =

Gum-based chewable sweets

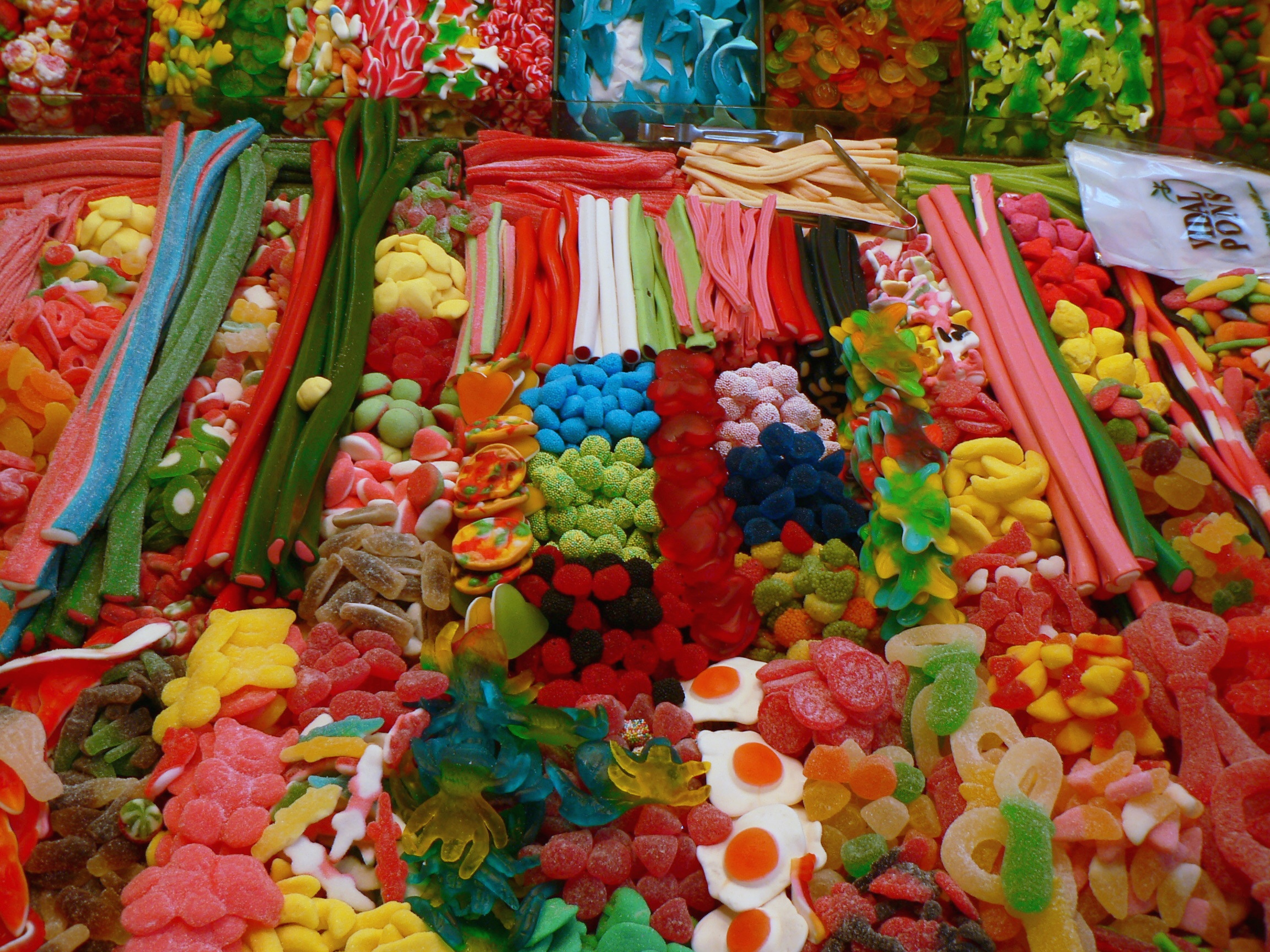
- Collection of gummy candies at a market in Barcelona
- Alternative names: Gummies, jelly sweets
- Type: Confectionery
- Place of origin: United Kingdom; Germany; United States
- Main ingredients: Gelatin/natural gum
- Variations: Gummy bear, Jelly Babies, gummy worms

Gummies, fruitgums, gummi candies, gummy candies, or jelly sweets are a broad category of gelatin- or gum-based chewable sweets. Popular types include gummy bears, Sour Patch Kids, Jelly Babies and gummy worms. Various brands such as Bassett's and Haribo manufacture gummy sweets, often targeted at young children. The name gummi originated in Germany, with the terms jelly sweets and gums more common in the United Kingdom.

== History ==
Gummies have a long history as a popular confectionery, appearing as early as the 19th century. Modern gummy candy is descended from stickier, earlier candies like Turkish delight and Japanese rice candy.

Peter Cooper was the first to create an edible gelatin. Cooper purchased a glue factory in 1822, of which one of its productions was taking animal-based by-products and turning them into gelatin. He patented the invention on 20 June 1845. The patent was later sold to Pearl Wait—a cough syrup manufacturer—via Mr. Cooper's estate. Later, Mr. Wait's wife May renamed the product to the catchy name Jell-O.

The first gelatin-based shaped candy was the Unclaimed Babies, sold by Fryers of Lancashire in 1864.

In the 1920s, Hans Riegel Sr. of Germany started his own candy company and eventually popularized the fruit-flavored gummy candy with gelatin as the main ingredient. By the start of World War II, the company started by Riegel employed over 400 people and produced multiple tons of candy each day. The company was named Haribo, and it became a main producer of gummy bears.

In America, the Jelly Belly Candy Company, formerly known as the Herman Goelitz Candy Company, began selling candies in 1869. The gourmet jelly bean began to be sold in 1976. In 1981, Jelly Belly launched their first gummy bear, and Trolli began selling their gummy worms. In 1982, Haribo opened its first American office.

== Ingredients ==
Gummy candies are made mostly of corn syrup, sucrose, gelatin, starch and water. In addition, minor amounts of coloring and flavoring agents are used. Food acids such as citric acid and malic acid are also added in order to give a sharp flavor to gummies. It is often that other gelling agents are used in place of gelatin to make gummy candies suitable for vegans or vegetarians, such as agar agar, starch and pectin.

== Types of gummies ==
=== Jelly Babies ===
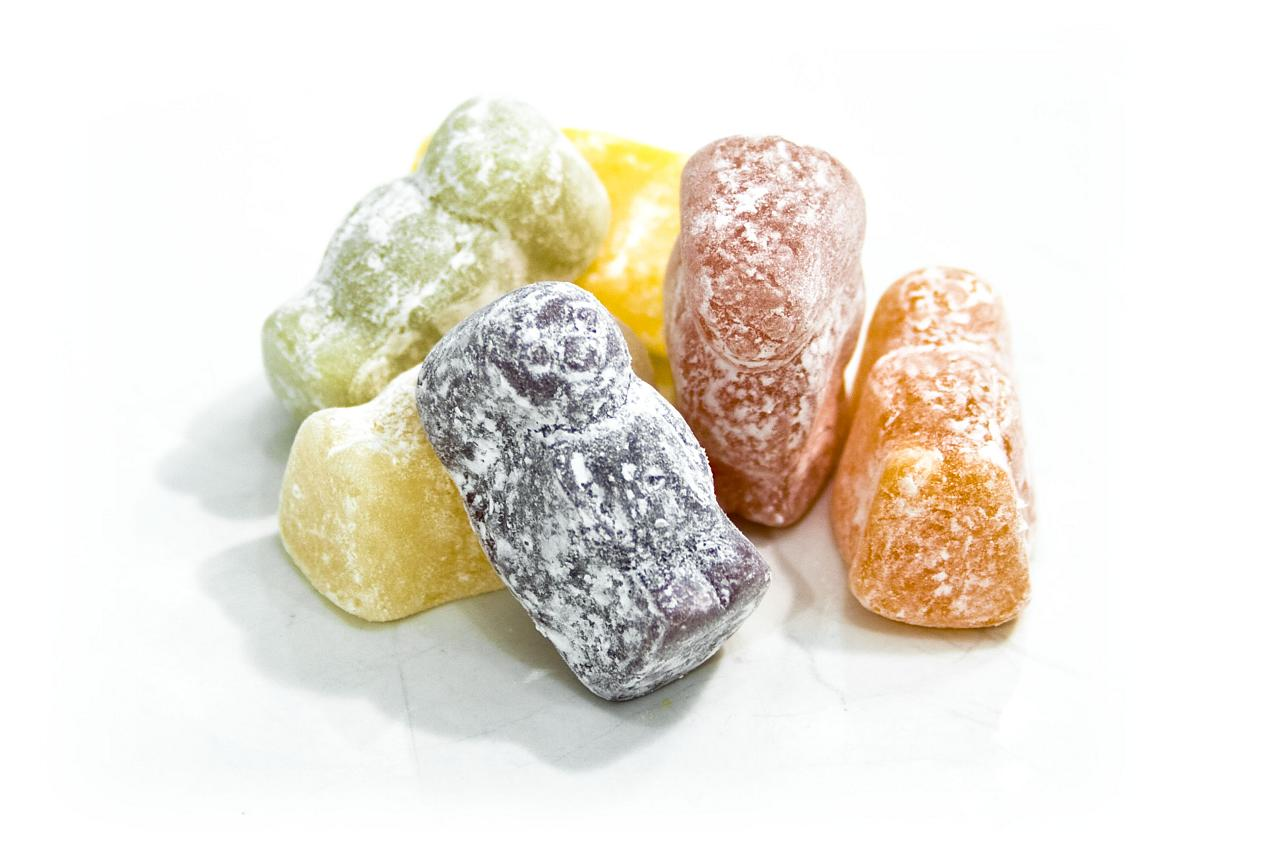
Jelly Babies

Jelly Babies originated in the United Kingdom and were first produced in 1864 by Fryers of Lancashire, where they were initially sold as "Unclaimed Babies". By 1918, they were being produced by Bassett's in Sheffield, which later popularized the confection.

=== Bears ===
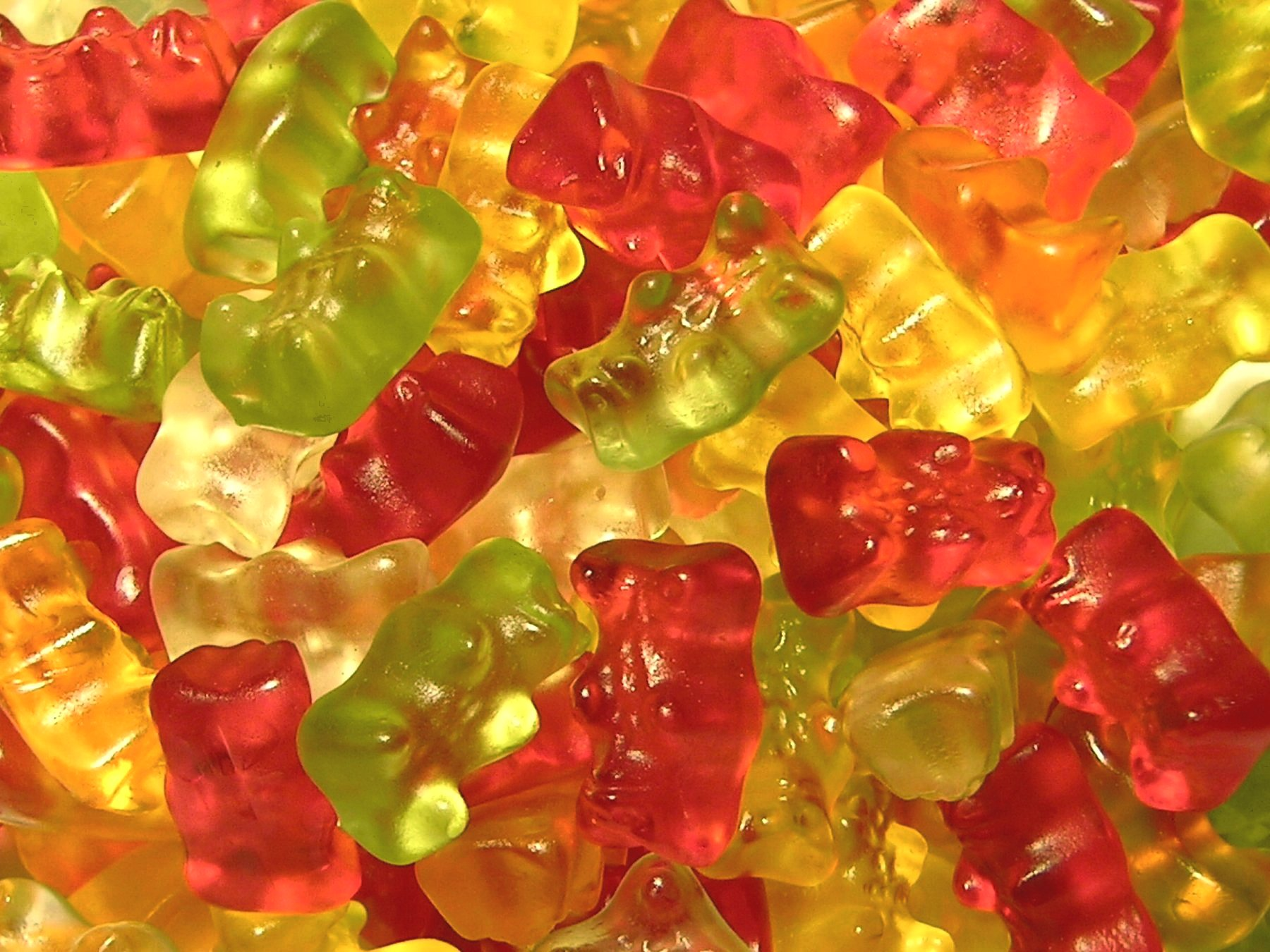
Haribo gummy bears from Germany were the first gummy candy to be invented.

Gummy bears originated in Germany, where it is popular under the name Gummibär (rubber bear) or Gummibärchen (little rubber bear). Hans Riegel Sr., a maker from Bonn, produced these sweets under the Haribo company name, which he started in 1920.

=== Cola Bottles ===
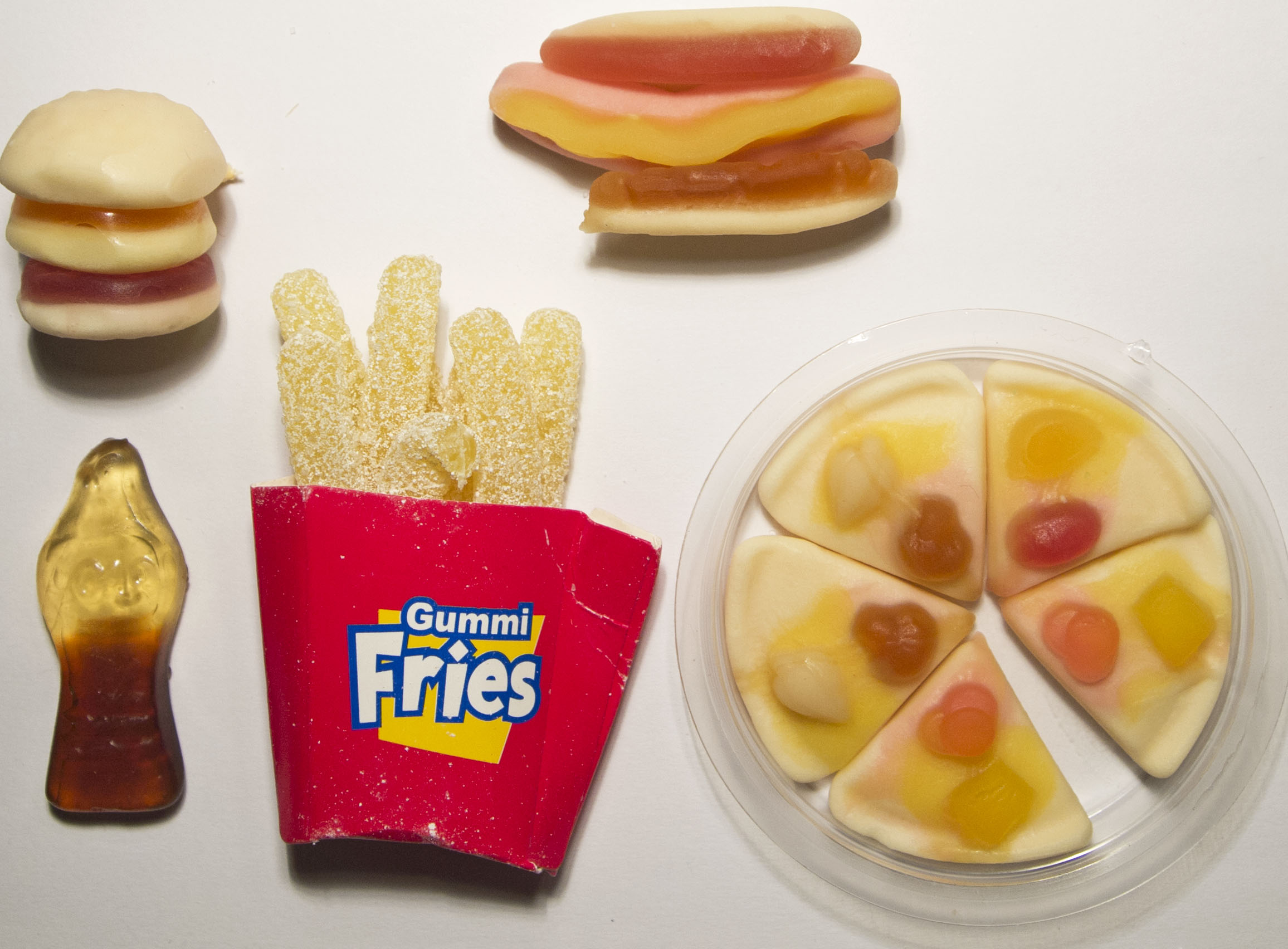
Various gummy food items: a cola bottle gummy, a gummy hot dog, a pizza, a hamburger, and a box of fries

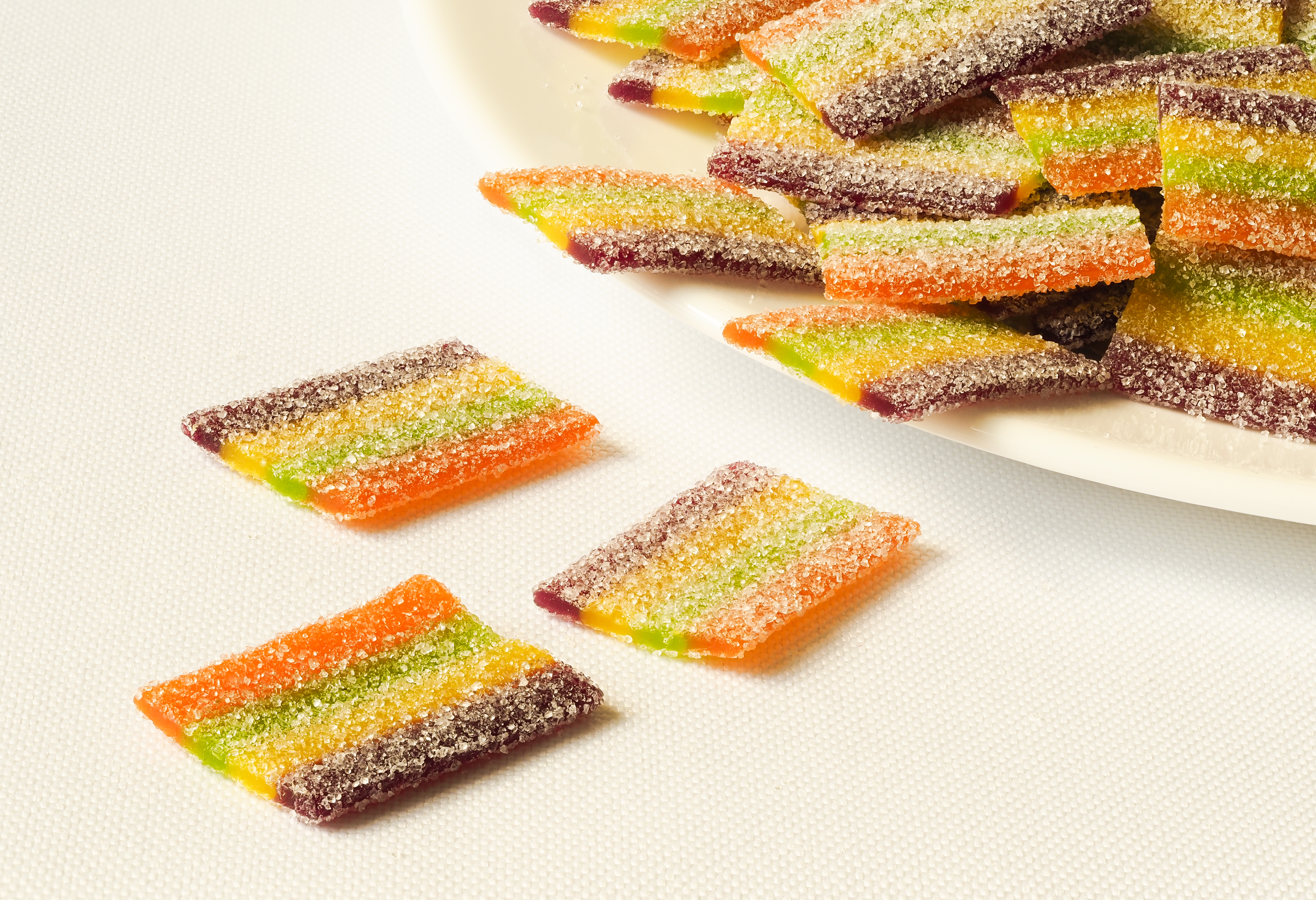
Vegan rainbow sour belts with taste of strawberry made by Candy Plus, Czech Republic

Cola bottles are sweets in the shape of classic Coca-Cola-style bottles with a cola flavor. They are produced by numerous companies. "Fizzy Blue Bottles", made by Lutti (formerly part of the French division of the Leaf Company, now controlled by a private investment group), are sweets typically found in a pick and mix selection. These are very similar to cola bottle gummies in shape, but they are usually sour and coloured blue and pink. "Blue Bottles", a variation from another company, are identifiable by the small rims around the sides, and are chewier and thicker, with a sweeter taste. There are also Lime cola bottles, which typically retain the brownish-red colour and replace the clear top with a green colour, and mint flavoured bottles, which replace the cola flavor with a mint flavor and are typically green instead of brown-red.

=== Rings ===
A ring-shaped gummy is often covered in sugar or sour powder. The most common and popular flavor is the peach ring. Other flavors include green apple, melon, blue raspberry, strawberry, and aniseed—although these are typically coated in chocolate. A commonly known producer of gummy rings is Trolli, for which the gummy rings are an important asset.

=== Red frogs ===
In Australia, jelly confectionery in the shape of frogs has been very popular since the 1930s. They are colored red or green, although they are usually referred to as "red frogs". These have influenced the shape, structure, consistency and formula that make gummy bears. Red frog gummies are not associated with the Red Frogs Association.

=== Roadkill ===
In 2004, Trolli's U.S. arm introduced a roadkill-themed gummy candy in the shape of flattened animals. In February 2005, following complaints by the New Jersey Society for the Prevention of Cruelty to Animals, Kraft decided to stop production of the controversial Trolli U.S. Road Kill Gummies. The society complained that the products, shaped as partly flattened squirrels, chickens and snakes, would give children an incorrect message on the proper treatment of animals.

=== Teeth ===
In Australia, jelly confectionery in the shape of teeth has been very popular since the 1930s. They are colored pink and white, with pink representing the gums and teeth being white. They have a slight minty flavor, similar to mint toothpaste.

=== Vitamin ===
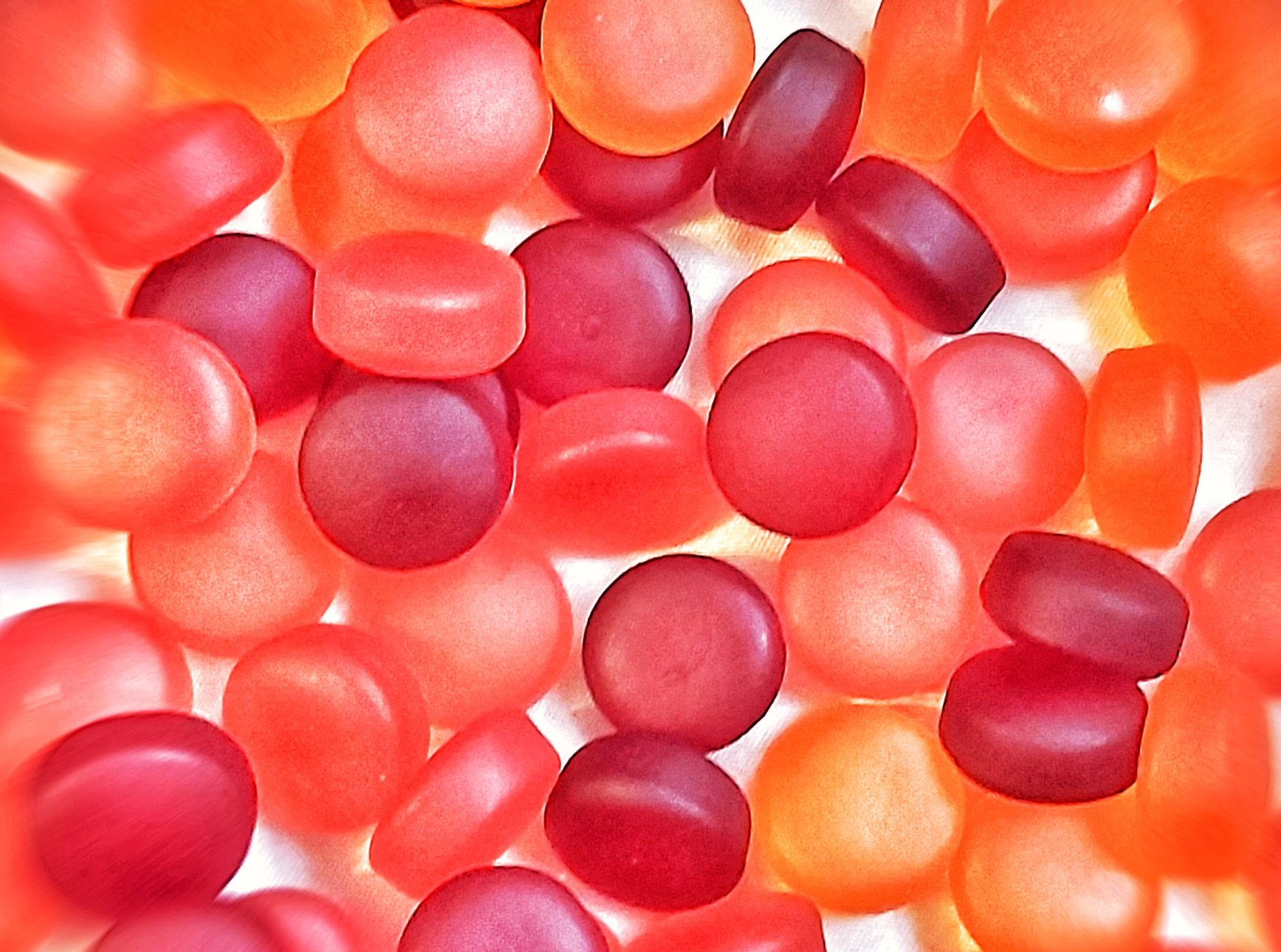
Vitamin D gummies

There are also several multi-vitamin gummy products, usually marketed for children, such as Flintstones Chewable Vitamins. They are more palatable and appealing to children than equivalent vitamin pills.

=== Worm ===
Worm-shaped gummy candy can be attributed to the German confectionery manufacturer Trolli in 1981. They are a popular choice among Halloween trick-or-treaters, and sold with different flavors and coatings.

=== Gumdrop ===
Colorful gumdrops are a typical form of gummies. Some of the most widely known among most are Dots, a chewy candy shaped like a dome. They were made in 1945 when demand rapidly increased for a cheap candy after World War II. The five original flavors of Dots included cherry, strawberry, lemon, lime, and orange. Dots were unlike any other candy on the market at the time, due to their lack of sugar coating much like other candies that were being circulated.

== Health considerations ==
Times Scientists have studied adding the tooth-protecting sugar substitute xylitol to gummies to prevent tooth decay caused by sugar.

Choking risks are higher with gummy candies; research shows that "hard, round foods with high elasticity or lubricity properties, or both, pose a significant level of risk," especially to children under three years of age. This can be resolved with use of the Heimlich maneuver.

== Storage ==
Storage of gummy candies in conditions of high humidity will result in the moisture migration of water molecules from the surrounding environment into the candy. If gummy candies are exposed to an environment that is high in moisture content, it is likely that moisture will permeate the candy and increase its relative moisture content. An increase in the candy's moisture content will increase the molecular mobility of particles in the candy, leading to a variety of unwanted outcomes such as:

- Sucrose crystallization and subsequent grainy texture.
- A sticky candy surface.
- Diffusion of flavors out of the candy.
- Possibility of microbial growth.

Moisture migration of gummy candies can be prevented by storing candies in conditions where the surrounding environment is equal to their own moisture content.

== See also ==
- Albanese Candy
- Fruit Gems
- Fruit Pastilles
- Gumdrop
- Gummy supplements, gummy candy with dietary supplements, produced to be more palatable than regular supplements
- Jelly baby
- Jelly bean
- Quince cheese
- Swedish Fish
