= Gummy worms =

Gummy candy shaped like worms

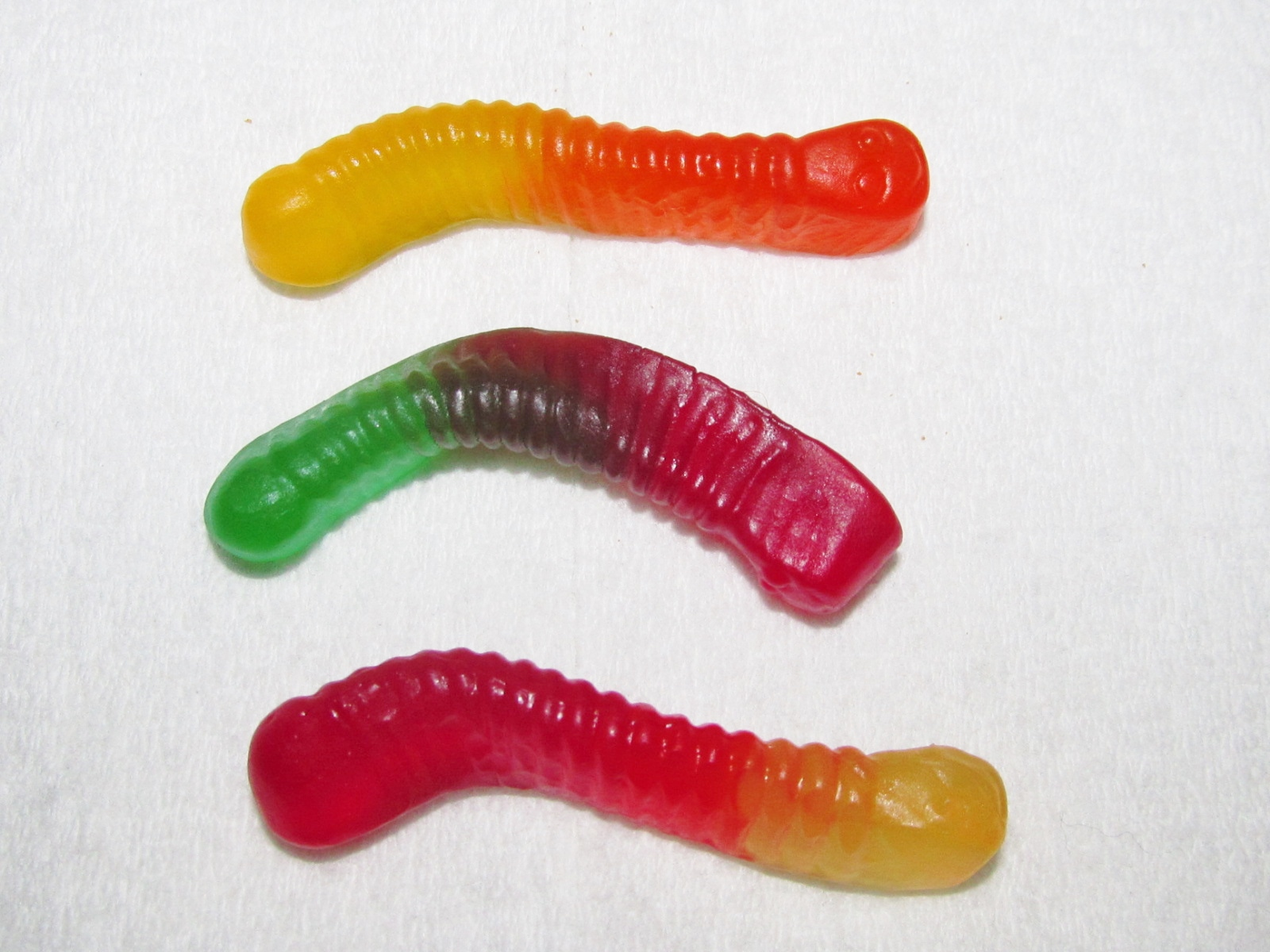
- Gummy worms
- Alternative names: Gummi worms, sour worms
- Type: Confectionery
- Place of origin: United States; Germany
- Main ingredients: Gelatin
- Variations: Gummy worms, sour worms, gummi worms

Gummy worms are a type of worm-shaped gummy candy. They are made from a mixture of sugar, corn syrup, gelatin, and flavorings. The German confectionery manufacturer Trolli invented gummy worms in 1981.

== Ingredients ==
The most common types of gummy worms typically contain gelatin, sugar, water, corn syrup or glucose syrup, flavorings (such as fruit extracts or artificial flavors), coloring agents, and, in some cases, citric acid for a sour taste. Additional ingredients may include vegetable oils or waxes for coating and for preventing sticking.

== Variations ==
Gummy worms are sold in various flavors, sizes, and textures. Flavors include traditional fruit flavors such as cherry, strawberry, orange, sour apple, watermelon, and tropical blends.

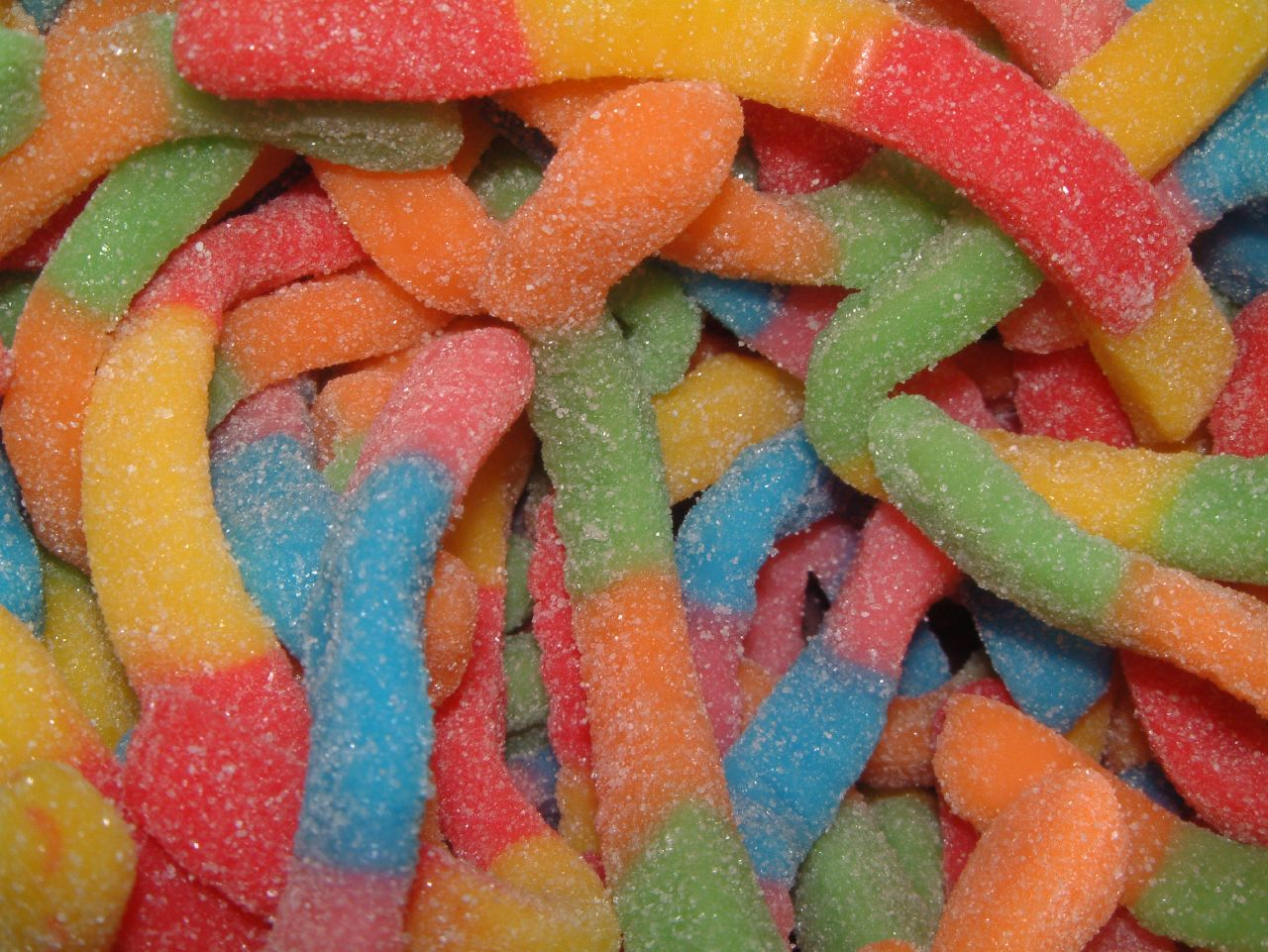
Gummy worms with a sour coating

Some gummy worms have a sugar coating, and others have a sour dusting. In terms of size, gummy worms can range from small, bite-sized pieces to larger, jumbo versions. Additionally, there are variations in texture, with some gummy worms having a softer, chewier consistency while others provide a firmer bite.
