= Hans Riegel Sr. =

German businessman and inventor of the gummy bear

- Born: Johannes Hans Riegel; 4 April 1893; Friesdorf (Bonn), Germany
- Died: 31 March 1945 (aged 51)
- Resting place: Südfriedhof (Bonn, Germany)
- Occupation: Inventor
- Years active: 1922–1945
- Spouse: Gertrud Vianden (m. 1921)
- Children: 3, including Hans Jr. and Paul

Johannes "Hans" Riegel Sr. (4 April 1893 – 31 March 1945) was a German confectioner who invented the gummy bear in 1920 and founded the Haribo company.

== Haribo ==
After leaving his job at a confectionary factory he founded the sweet company, choosing the name by mixing together the first two letters of his name Hans Riegel and the city of Bonn, where he was born.

The company was passed on to his sons, Hans Riegel Jr. and Paul Riegel, following his death in 1945. The company was managed by Gertrud for the first year after Hans' death as Hans Jr and Paul were still prisoners of war at this time; they were set free in 1946 and subsequently took charge of the company until their deaths.

== Personal life ==
He was married to Gertrud (née Vianden), who was also the person Riegel hired to work at Haribo. Riegel died on 31 March 1945.
