= Albanese Candy =

American candy manufacturer

Coordinates: 41°28′12″N 87°16′12″W

Albanese Confectionery Group, Inc.
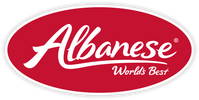
- Industry: Confectionery manufacturing
- Founded: 1983; 43 years ago
- Founder: Scott Albanese
- Website: albanesecandy.com

Albanese Candy is a candy manufacturer in Hobart, Indiana. Founded in 1983 by Scott Albanese of Dolton, Illinois, it specializes in the production of gummies and chocolate-covered confections. As of 2022, the company employs roughly 700 workers and distributes products in 41 countries.

== History ==
Initially a retail candy store in Merrillville, Indiana, the company later began manufacturing and selling their own roasted and coated nuts, eventually expanding the operation for local distribution. By 1995, the facility had 10–12 employees.

In the mid-1990s, Scott Albanese began searching for a way to develop gummy bears with stronger and more specific fruit flavors; the company began manufacturing gummy candies upon the completion of this endeavour in 1998. The system coats the candy trays with corn starch, a process used by only three candy-makers in the United States. Albanese is particularly known for its gummy candy; the Hobart store sells gummy worms, butterflies, and green army soldiers amongst many other shapes and flavors. In 2006, the company introduced 27 in (690 mm) multicolor gummy snakes. More than 300,000 lb (140,000 kg) of gummy bears are sold every day.

The Albanese company's soldier-shaped gummies were shipped to Iraq and distributed to deployed soldiers in 2003. The company later developed a product line featuring military jet aircraft molds: a B-2 Spirit, F-15 Eagle, F/A-18 Hornet, F/A-22 Raptor, F-117 Nighthawk, and SR-71 Blackbird.

In late 2004, a factory measuring 350,000 sq ft (33,000 m^{2}) and an outlet store were opened in Hobart, Indiana. The Hobart factory formerly offered self-guided tours; in the entrance hall, there was a 32 ft-tall (9.8 m) chocolate fountain, the largest in the country.

In 2014, the company spent $16 million to expand its retail store to 190,000 sq ft (18,000 m^{2}). From January to April of that year, the Espace Louis Vuitton in Tokyo, Japan exhibited a mural constructed out of the company's gummy bears.

In 2017, the company announced a $33 million expansion of their Hobart location, including the hiring of 150 additional employees, for which they received a ten-year tax abatement from the local government.

In 2019, the company's Hobart location suffered a machinery fire.

In 2020, one of the workers at the Hobart factory had to be airlifted to a hospital following an on-the-job injury.

== See also ==
- Albanese Candy Bowl
