= Maoam =

German brand of sweets

Logo in 2022

Maoam is a German brand of sweets produced by the German confectionery company Haribo. The product name is a century old. The product consists of chewy fruit-flavoured candy in various flavours. A packet of Maoam sweets usually includes five pieces of a particular flavour, and several of these packets are stacked into a stick which is then sold. The sweets are also available in larger packages. Maoam sweets contain gelatine.

== History ==
Historical ambigram logo, between 1900 and 1931

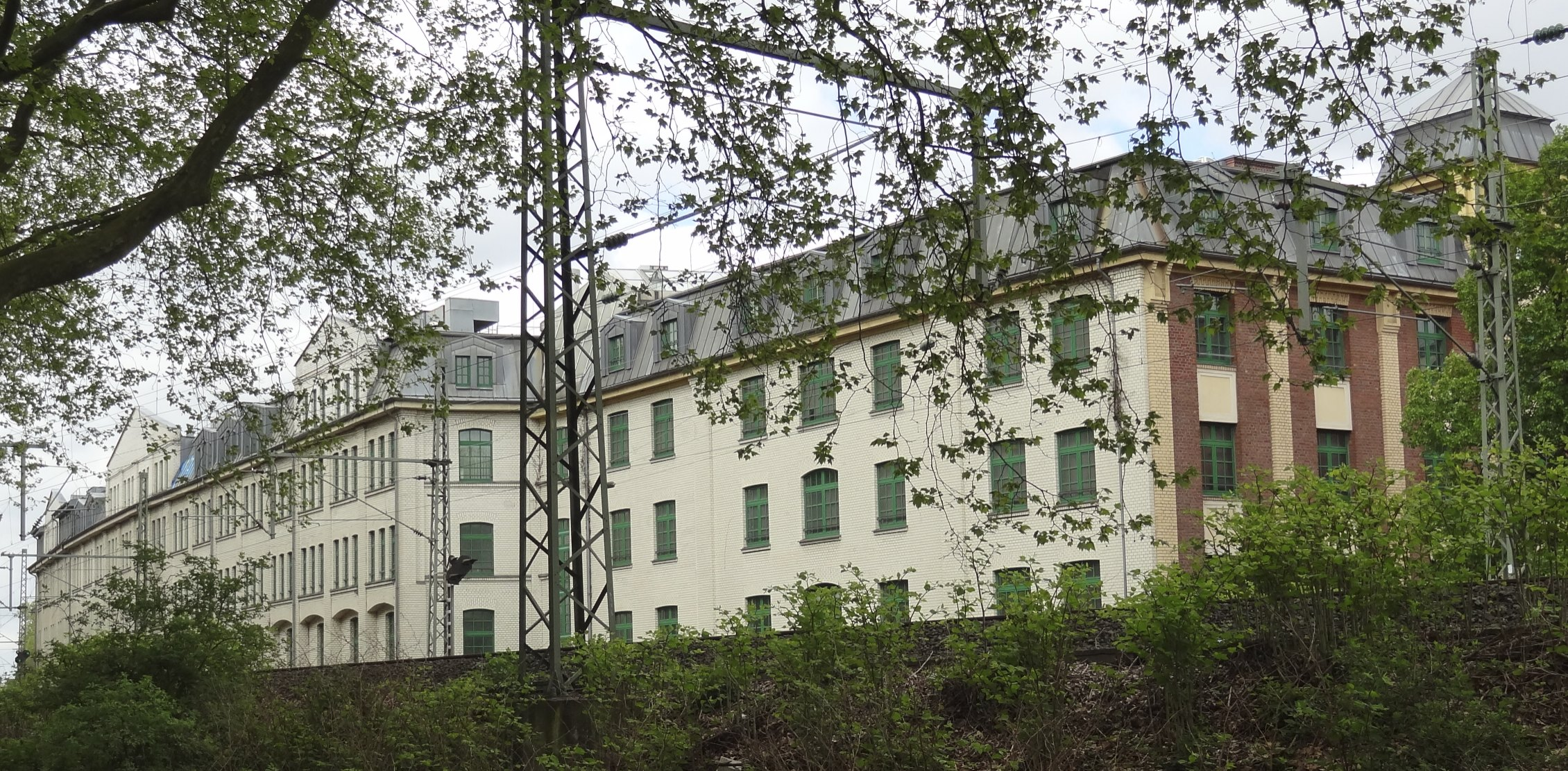
The former Maoam factory at Hildebrandstraße in Düsseldorf

Edmund Münster took over the "Düsseldorfer Lakritzenwerk" in 1900. The company primarily produced liquorice candy until the 1930s; in 1930 or 1931 Münster acquired a licence from abroad to produce a chewy fruity candy under the name "Maoam". The name of the product is an invention, and the abbreviation of "Mundet allen ohne Ausnahme" (They taste good to everyone, without exception, in German). In August 1930 Münster received a "utility model for the product Maoam, a chewy candy without chewing gum, made of sugar, syrup and other ingredients" from Düsseldorf. The model covers the name Maoam, the product, the package and any imitation made of liquorice, cocoa, sugar or bakery products.

Edmund Münster GmbH & Co. started producing the candy, which was wrapped in wax paper. Maoam sales began on Easter 1931 in characteristic Maoam palindrome logo. The packaging has only changed slightly to this day. Imitations of these chewy candies began to appear, which was to be expected from the success of the product. After the war, Münster resumed production of the candies.

In 1986 the confectionery company Haribo based in Bonn bought the production and rights to the Maoam candy.

From 1930 to 1982 the candy was produced in a facility on Hildebrandtstraße of the Friedrichstadt district of Düsseldorf; it is now produced at the old Novesia factory on Jülicher Landstraße in Neuss.

== Advertisements ==
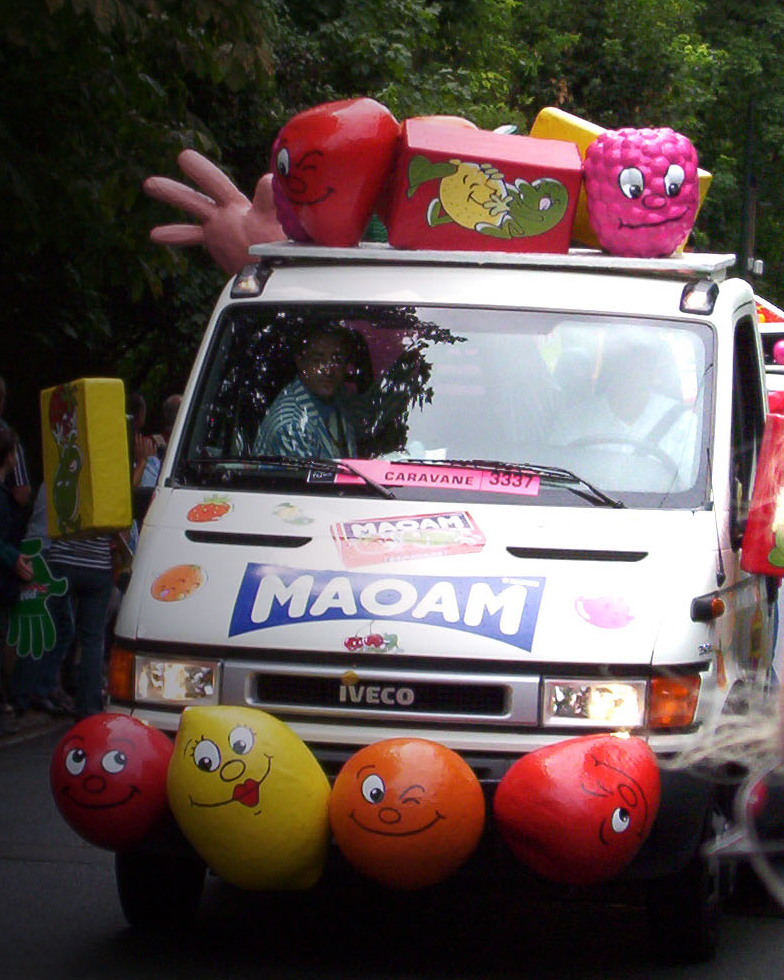
Maoam marketing caravan, 2003

A popular slogan used in Maoam advertisements is "Was wollt ihr denn?!" (German for "What do you want, then?!"). In the advertisements, a group of people are asked what they want next, for example the audience at a football match or at a large television broadcast. The people are always given two options (for example "Do you want extra time?" - "Do you want a penalty shootout?") After both options have been answered with a loud "No!", the follow-up question is "What do you want, then?", which the audience answers with a loud cry of "Maoam, Maoam..." The football referee Walter Eschweiler used to star in these advertisements.

The former volleyball Bundesliga champion VC Eintracht Mendig changed their name to Maoam Mendig per sponsorship from 2003 to 2005.

In 2016 Maoam launched the "Full On... Till It's Gone" campaign in UK, in which a man dances bizarrely in an auditorium after eating a Maoam stripe.
