= Gummy supplement =

Food supplements in the form of gummy candies

Gummy supplements, are dietary supplements delivered as gummy-candy-like products, most commonly comprising vitamins. They are often used as a more palatable alternative to other supplement formulations.

The price of gummy supplements varies by brand, but can be considered comparable to the cost of similar supplements.

The gummy supplement market is rapidly growing, driven by growing awareness of preventive care, rising cases of undernourishment in developing countries and a rise in new product offerings from both major traditional pharmaceutical companies, as well as new startups.

Global sales of gummy vitamins in 2022 are estimated to be over US$7 billion, with some sources predicting a rise to US$42 billion by 2030.

== Common constitution and varieties ==
Most commonly, gummy supplements are made from gelatin, cornstarch, water and sugar, along with flavorings.

Although gummy vitamins are the most popular type of gummy supplements, they may also be derived from herbal supplements, containing extracts from plants like ashwagandha and cannabis (e.g., CBD), as well as the algae-derived astaxanthin.

Gummy supplements for hair health have been advertised in social media by influencers but there are concerns regarding efficacy and safety.

Other novel types of gummy supplements include 3D printed gummies and collagen gummies.

The rising popularity of gummy supplements has led to many high-profile celebrity endorsed campaigns and product lines, including lines by Kourtney Kardashian, Martha Stewart and Alicia Silverstone.

== Health effects and benefits ==
Gummy supplements often provide similar benefits to their traditional multivitamins or other dietary supplement equivalents, due to generally comprising the same active ingredients. The primary benefit of gummy supplements over their counterparts, however, is their imitation of candy, providing a pleasant taste and easy-to-consume nature, which appeals to many children and adults who may not like swallowing pills.

== Criticisms and adverse effects ==
Although marketed to the general population, research suggests that most people who eat a balanced diet do not need to take vitamin or mineral supplements.

Often the appealing taste of gummy supplements comes from added sugars, which may lead to excessive sugar consumption, linked to obesity, heart disease and dental cavities. Due to this, increasing sugar-free options now exist, however these can often contain sugar alcohols, which can lead to diarrhea or nausea.

Many gummy supplements contain artificial food colorings, which have been linked in some studies to behavioral issues in children.

Due to their nature replicating candy, they may be susceptible to overconsumption, particularly in children, which may lead to vitamin or mineral toxicity.

In the United States, gummy supplements are regulated by the Food and Drug Administration as a food, meaning less rigorous research and testing is required than medicines. The FDA does not have the authority to approve supplements for safety and effectiveness, or to approve their labeling, before being sold to the public.

Due to the necessity to contain other ingredients for taste, texture and color, gummy supplements can have lower amounts of the active ingredient than traditional methods.

== Notable gummy supplement producers ==
- One A Day
- Church & Dwight
- Centrum
- Nature's Bounty
- Olly

== See also ==
- Gummy candy
- Multivitamins
- Dietary supplements
