= Haribo =

German confectionery company

Haribo GmbH & Co. KG
- Type: Private
- Industry: Confectionery
- Founded: 13 December 1920; 105 years ago
- Founder: Hans Riegel Sr.
- Headquarters: Grafschaft, Rhineland-Palatinate, Germany
- Area served: Worldwide
- Products: Gummy confectionary, especially gummy candy
- Revenue: €1.7–2.0 billion
- Number of employees: ~7,000 (2018)
- Website: haribo.com

Haribo GmbH & Co. KG (German: [ˈhaːʁiboː], English: /ˈhærɪboʊ/ HARR-ib-oh; stylized in all caps) is a German confectionery company founded by Hans Riegel Sr. It began in Kessenich, Bonn, Germany. The name "Haribo" is a syllabic abbreviation formed from Hans Riegel Bonn. The company created the first gummy candy in 1922 in the form of little gummy bears; this was later reworked into what became Goldbear which remains the company's flagship product. The current headquarters are in Grafschaft, Germany.

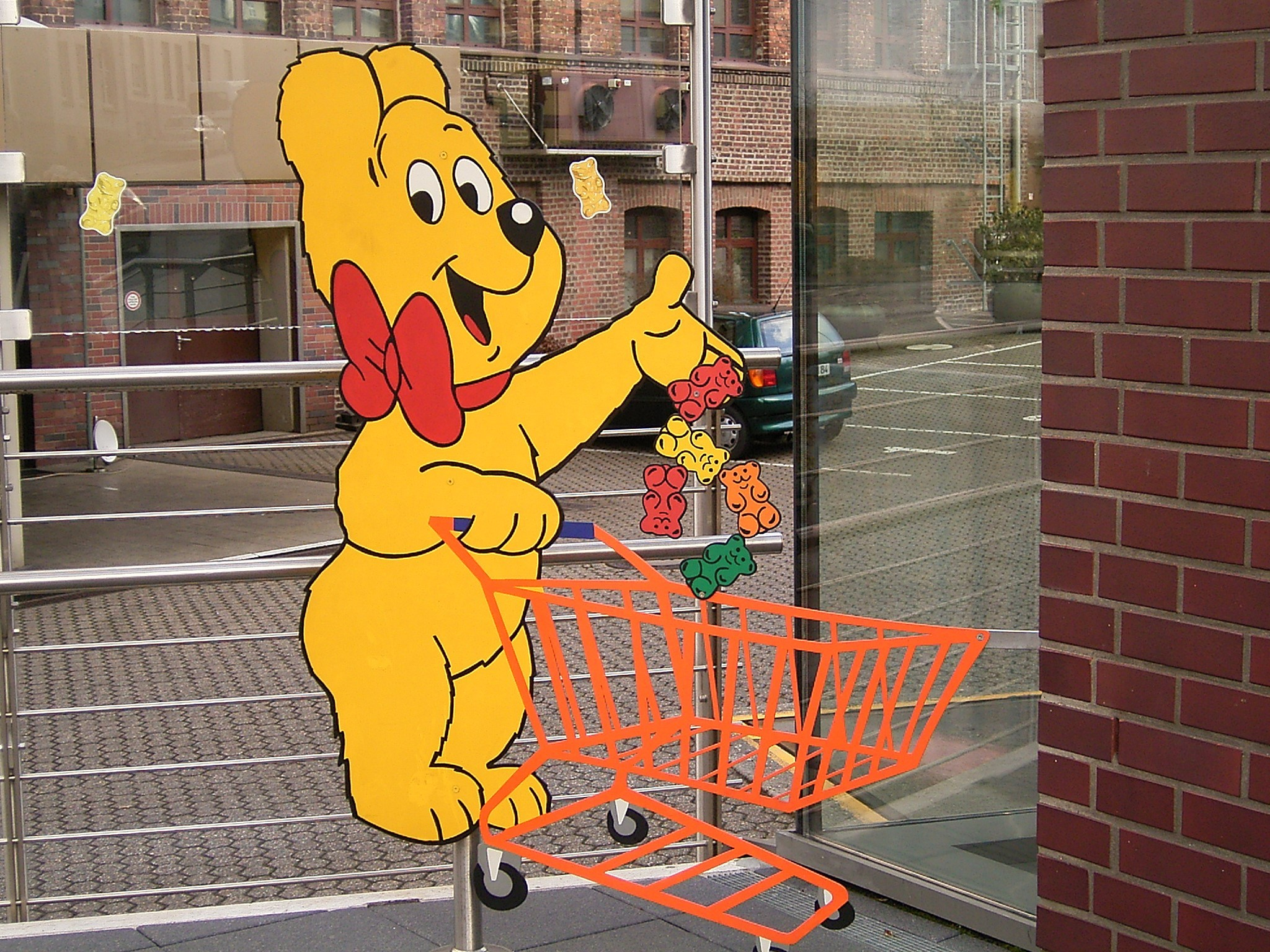
The Haribo Goldbear mascot

== History ==
=== Early history ===
On 13 December 1920, the company was registered in the commercial register by its founder Johannes Riegel. In 1921, his wife Gertrud Riegel was the company's first employee. According to the company, Riegel's seed capital was a sack of sugar, a copper pot, a marble slab, a stool, a stonewalled stove and a roller. In the same year, he bought a house that was located in the Kessenich district of Bonn, on a street called Bergstraße. The house was Haribo's first production facility.

Two years after the company's founding, Hans Riegel invented the precursor of the Goldbear, which was still called Tanzbär (Dancing Bear) at that time. However, it was not only bigger than the present gummy bears, but also softer, due to the use of gum arabic instead of the now common gelatine.

In 1925, Haribo began producing licorice products. The sales organization in Germany and the main building of the new production facility were established at the beginning of the 1930s.

=== 1940s-1990s ===
According to the company, production fell immensely during the Second World War, partly due to a shortage of raw materials. After Johann Riegel's early death in March 1945, the company was initially continued by his wife. After sons Hans and Paul returned from captivity in 1946, they took over its management.

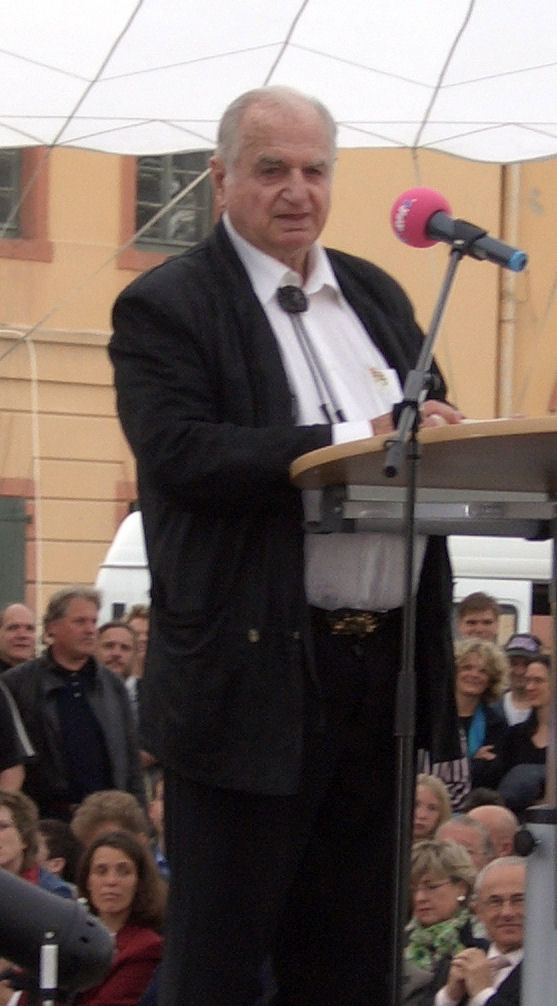
Hans Riegel Jr.

Hans Riegel Junior represented the company externally, while Paul Riegel headed research and product development and hardly ever appeared in public. In 1957, Haribo took over the Godesberg company Kleutgen & Meier, where Hans Riegel Senior had had his first job. In 1961, Haribo took over Bonera Industrie en Handelsmaatschappij NV in Breda and continued to run it as Haribo Nederland BV. In the 1960s, a new headquarters building opened in Bonn.

In 1967, Haribo acquired shares in the French confectionery factory Lorette, in Marseille, which was renamed Haribo-France SA. In 1987 it merged with the southern French manufacturer Ricqles Zan to form Haribo Ricqles-Zan with production facilities in Marseille, Uzès and Wattrelos. The company's only small factory museum is also located at the Uzès site.

In 1968, Haribo bought shares in the Solingen company Dr. Hillers, eventually taking it over completely in 1979. From 1980 onwards, a new production facility was built at the site in three expansion phases. In October 2011, the Solingen location was expanded to include a high-bay warehouse, an office building and a goods handling hall.

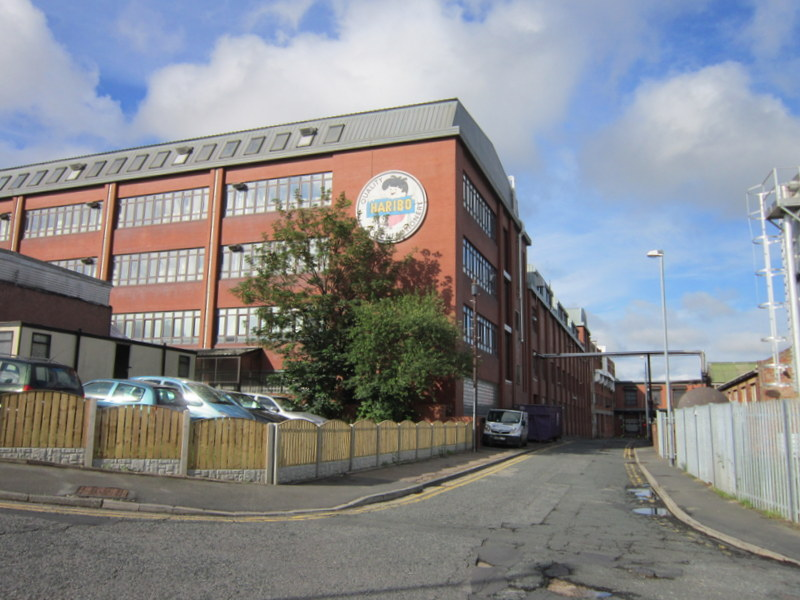
Haribo Confectionery's, Pontefract, England

Haribo has since expanded its operations, taking over many local confectionery manufacturers around the world. It began international expansion in the 1960s. Haribo entered the British sweets market by buying Dunhill's in 1972, a manufacturer of liquorice Pontefract cakes which was founded in the 18th century.

Historical Maoam logo in 1931

In 1986, the company bought the production and rights to Maoam and Haribo Chamallows (formerly "Dulcia").

==== Expansion into the United States ====
Haribo had been first imported locally in Hawaii and California in 1972, but between 1977 and 1979 it was later officially expanded nationwide. When Haribo of America was incorporated in the 1980s in Baltimore, Maryland, Haribo's gummi candies were introduced to the US mass market through retailers such as drugstores, grocery stores and discount stores. The packaging was translated into English, and package weights were adjusted to match US sizes. A laydown bag was used for US supermarkets, instead of the hanging bag commonly found in German supermarkets, and a boxed product was developed for theaters.

Sales soared the first year, and gummi bears became so popular in the US that the US market was soon flooded with competitors such as German Trolli and American Black Forest.

=== 2000-present ===
In October 2003, Hans Riegel Junior announced that one of his nephews, Hans-Jürgen Riegel (* 1956), would be his successor. He managed the company in France until 2005, but then fell out with his uncle and left the company. Co-owner Paul Riegel died unexpectedly on the night of 3 August 2009.

After the relationship with his nephew broke down, Hans Riegel decided to leave the question of succession open. This led to a conflict between the Haribo family tribes, as Paul Riegel's sons pursued a complaint to the Chamber of Commerce and Industry that had been initiated by their father in the summer of 2008 to clarify the legal issues. After their temporary suspension, an overall amicable solution was finally developed and presented in 2010.

As of 2013, Haribo operated 16 factories which produce over 100 million gummy bears per day. Hans Riegel died during recovery following the removal of a brain tumour on 15 October 2013. His position was filled by the Hans Riegel Foundation, which was created in 1987 and is now headed by Reinhard Schneider, authorized representative and also a long-time employee of Hans Riegel.

In 2015, Haribo of America moved to Chicago and established their headquarters in Rosemont, Illinois.

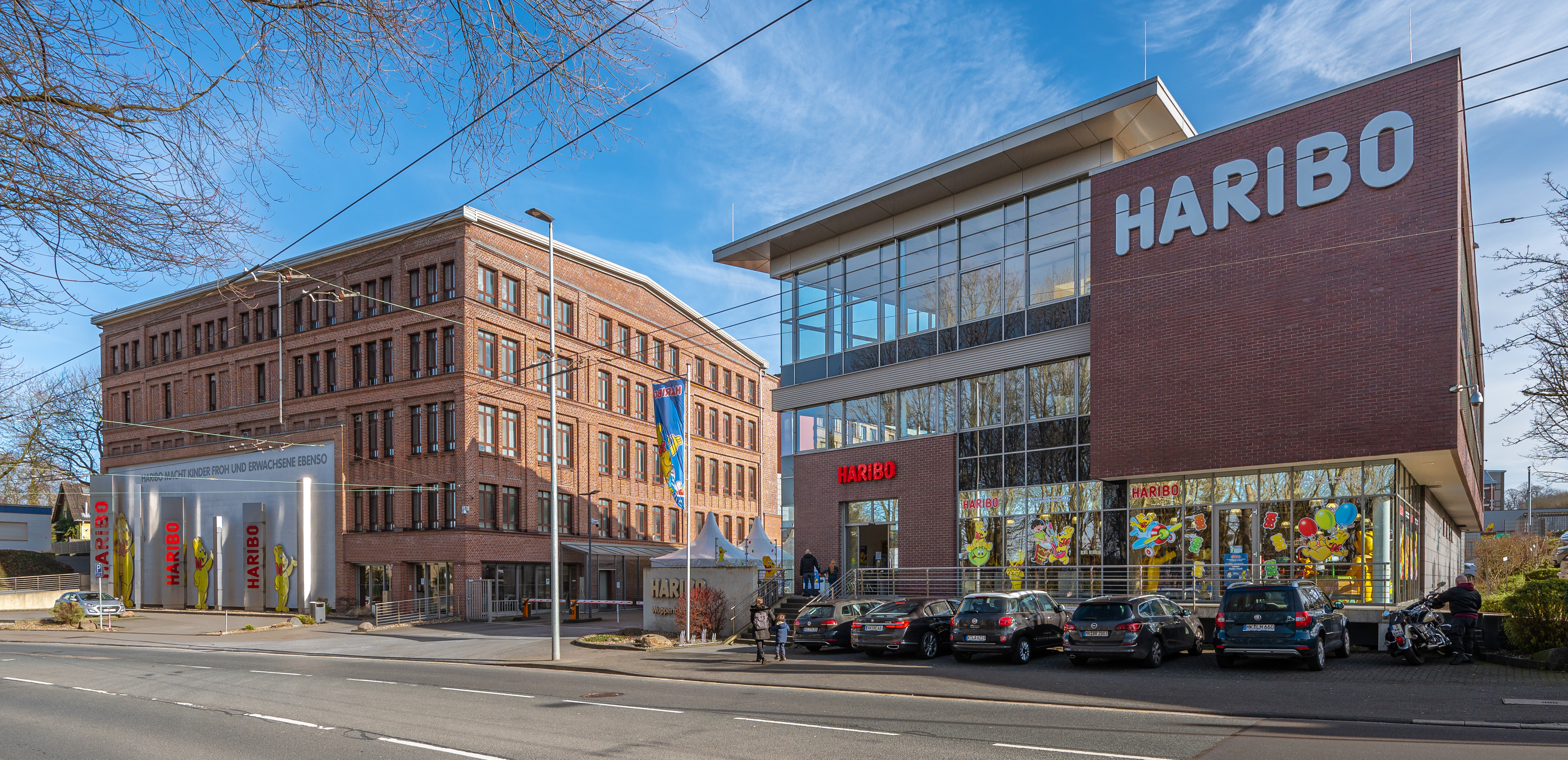
The Haribo Solingen factory in 2021

Haribo-Holding GmbH & Co. KG was then re-established. The Paul Riegel Family Holding and the Hans Riegel Holding, which were newly founded for this occasion, each have a half stake. At the same time, two intermediate holding companies were created below the new parent company to bundle the German business on the one hand and the international business on the other. Hans-Guido (* ~1966), Paul Riegel's son from his first marriage, became, like his father, managing director for production and technology alongside his uncle Hans, who continued to look after marketing and sales. Hans-Arndt (* ~1968), Paul Riegel's son from his second marriage, took over the chairmanship of a new four-member supervisory board. Long-time employee Andreas Nickenig (* ~1968), who was considered Hans Riegel's foster son and got along well with Paul's sons of the same age, also had a strong role in managing the foreign business.

The company headquarters remained in the Kessenich district of Bonn until, in May 2018, it was relocated to the municipality of Grafschaft in Rhineland-Palatinate. Bonn continues to be a production location. Public speculation about the company's plans to relocate the Bonn location with its 1,300 employees had been going on since 2005 because expansion was no longer possible there. The Rhineland-Palatinate town of Gelsdorf (community of Grafschaft) and its North Rhine-Westphalian neighboring town of Rheinbach were discussed at the time as new locations.

== Goldbears ==
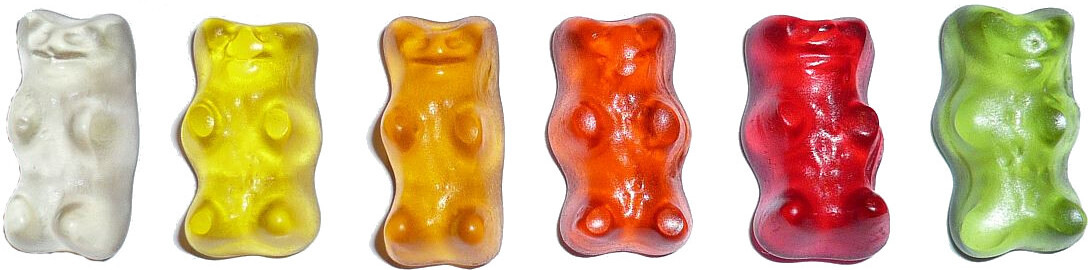
A set of Haribo Goldbears

Goldbears are fruit gums in the shape of stylized bears, that are two centimetres in size and consist of sugar, sugar syrup, colourants and flavourings. They also contain acidifiers, coating agents, water and a gelatin mixture, which gives the bears their rubbery consistency. Since 1960, Haribo calls its gummy bears Goldbears in order to distinguish them from other manufacturers' products. In 2005, Haribo produced about 100 million Goldbears daily in 15 factories throughout Europe to ensure the distribution in over 100 countries. The Goldbears account for Haribo's largest revenue share. According to the company, their brand awareness in Germany is 99 percent and the Goldbear stands for childlike happiness.

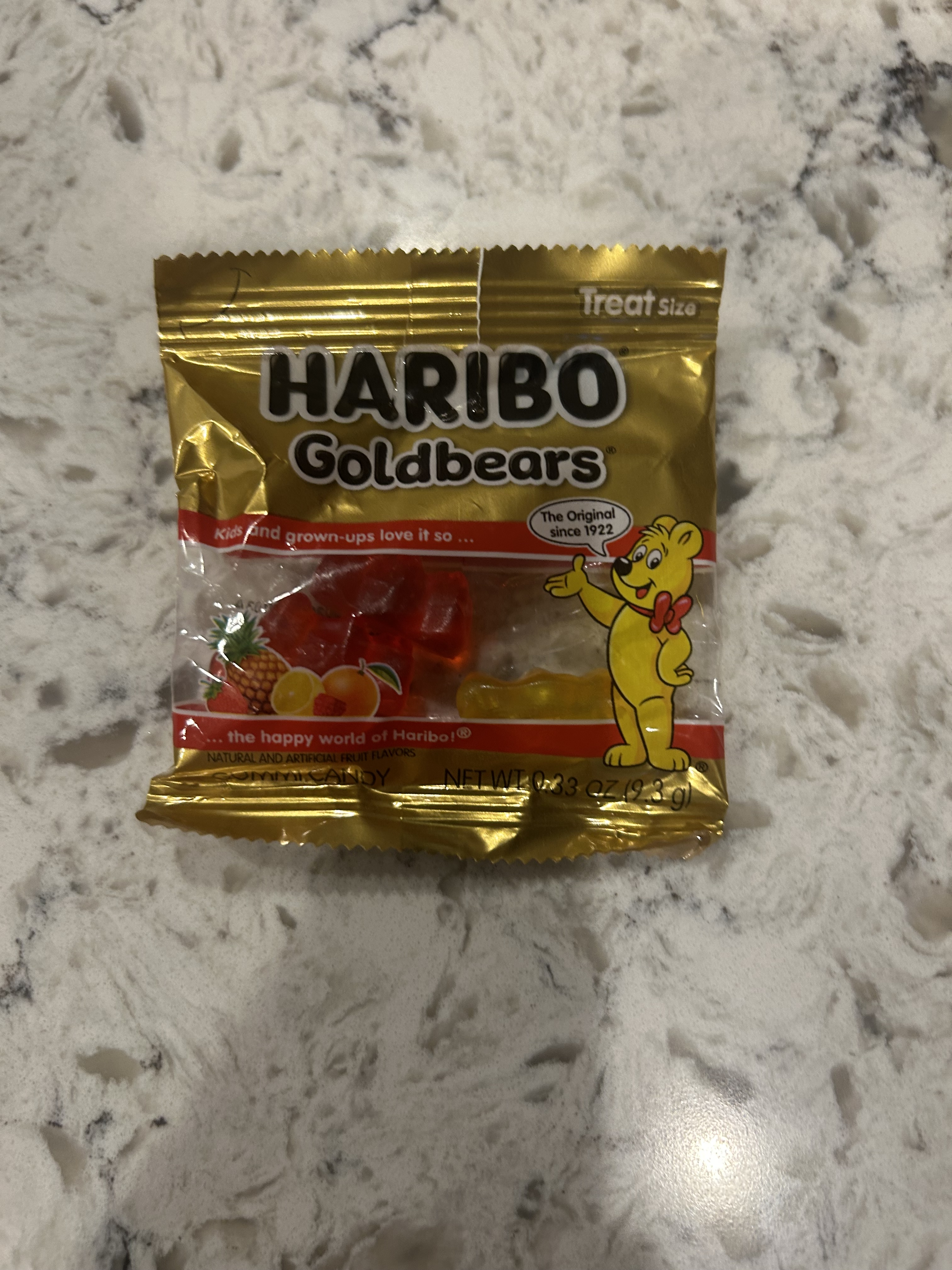
a Haribo Goldbears Treat Size bag

For the German market, they are coloured with natural fruit extracts, in contrast to the use of colorants in America. Although there are enough possibilities today to create a shade of blue, making the production of blue Goldbears possible, the Haribo management does not want to make any changes to the traditional product.

In August 2007, the product range was partly changed by adding apple as a new flavour and giving it a green colour. The strawberry flavour, which was hitherto assigned to green, was recoloured to light red. Additionally, the shape of the Goldbears was slightly changed, compared to the former generations, by giving them a smiling face.

Devoted to the UEFA Euro in 2008, Haribo produced Schwarz-Rot-Goldbären: a black, red and yellow Goldbear mix. The mix, which was inspired by the colour combination of the German flag, contained the flavours blackcurrant (black), raspberry (red) and lemon (yellow). For the first time, Haribo developed black Goldbears, which, besides blackcurrant, also contained elder extract.

On the occasion of the FIFA World Cup in 2014, Haribo produced the Goldbären-Fan-Edition. This mix included gummi bears in cherry (dark red), grapefruit (red), watermelon (green), woodruff (dark green) and apricot (orange) flavor as well as blue Goldbears in blueberry flavor.

=== Alternative versions ===
Specific versions of the Goldbear have been created and manufactured to cater to specific religious dietary laws. A halal certified version that substitutes the porcine gelatin for beef gelatin, slaughtered accordingly to Islamic dietary laws, are manufactured exclusively at a Haribo factory in Turkey. These are officially sold in Middle Eastern and Southeast Asian regions but also widely gray imported and available in other regions. A kosher certified version abiding by Jewish dietary laws is also manufactured at a factory in Austria. These are mainly exported to Israel as well as Jewish hubs in the United States.

A zero sugar version of the gummy bears was introduced in the US and Canada market in 2014. It removed the sugar and glucose syrup for a syrup called Lycasin, made of maltitol. After receiving many reports of consumers getting diarrhoea, caused by the maltitol, and a negative reception and media attention, Haribo quickly discontinued this version.

== Products ==
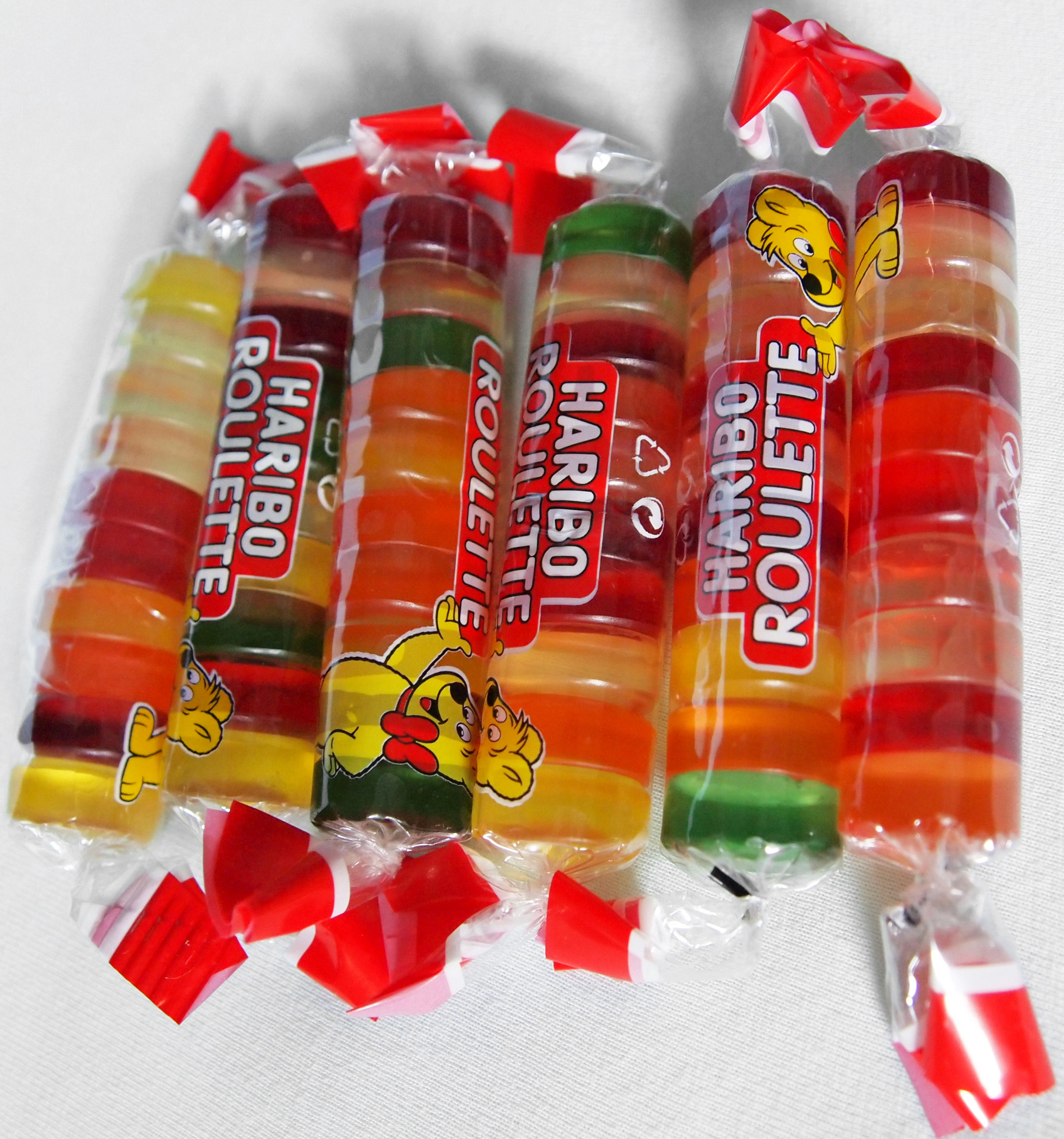
Haribo Roulette

Other than the flagship Goldbears, Haribo's other key brands around the world include Starmix, Happy Cola, Tangfastics, Supermix and Maoam, with Maoam being a brand of chewy sweets being bought in 1986 from Edmund Münster, the original manufacturer when it was launched in Germany in 1931.

== Production and international distribution ==
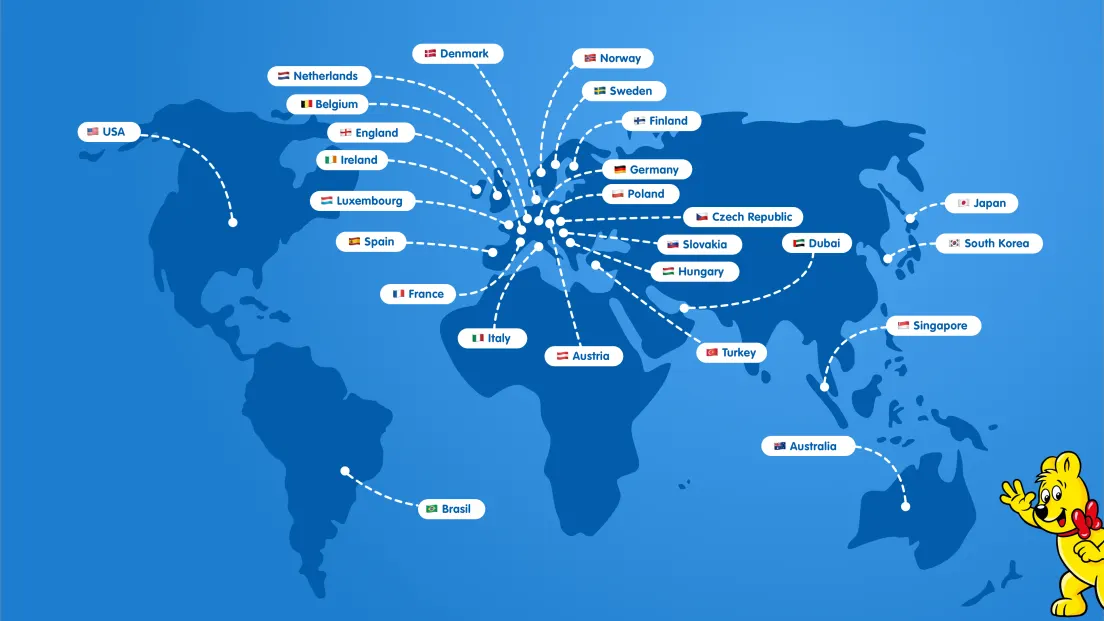
Countries with Haribo branches, with or without their own production facilities, which supply Haribo to more than 120 countries worldwide

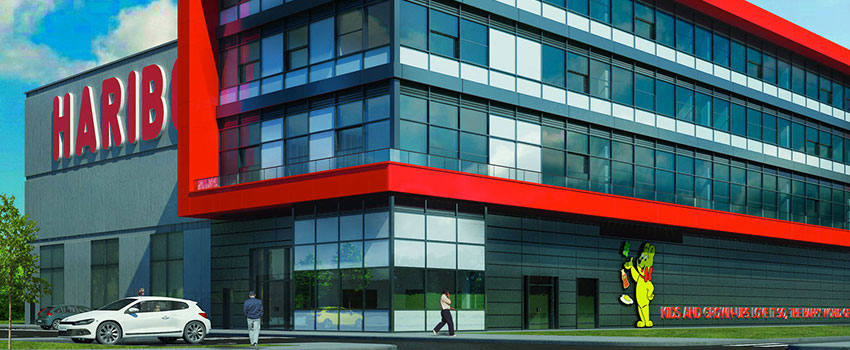
Haribo Normanton Distribution. New Haribo factory and automated warehouse in Castleford, England

Haribo operates numerous factories around the world. In Europe it consists of five in Germany including the main one in Bonn and a major one in Solingen, another in Neuss, and outside this region in the Bavarian Mainbernheim and Saxon Wilkau-Haßlau. There is a sole factory in Linz, Austria, whereas in Great Britain there are warehousing and production facilities in Castleford, which opened in 2013 and was extended in 2026, and one in Pontefract (which also manufactures Pontefract cakes). In France there are two production facilities in Uzès and Marseille and others in the region are in Denmark, Spain and Turkey.

In 2016, the company opened its first factory outside Europe, located in Brazil; In 2026, Haribo has announced the closure of its factory in Bauru, São Paulo, ending its manufacturing operations in Brazil.

On 23 March 2017, Haribo announced the opening of its first American factory, a 500,000-sq-ft (46,500 m^{2}), 400-employee manufacturing plant in Kenosha County, Wisconsin, Gilbane Building Company started construction in 2020. In 2023, the US factory started production and began producing Goldbears.

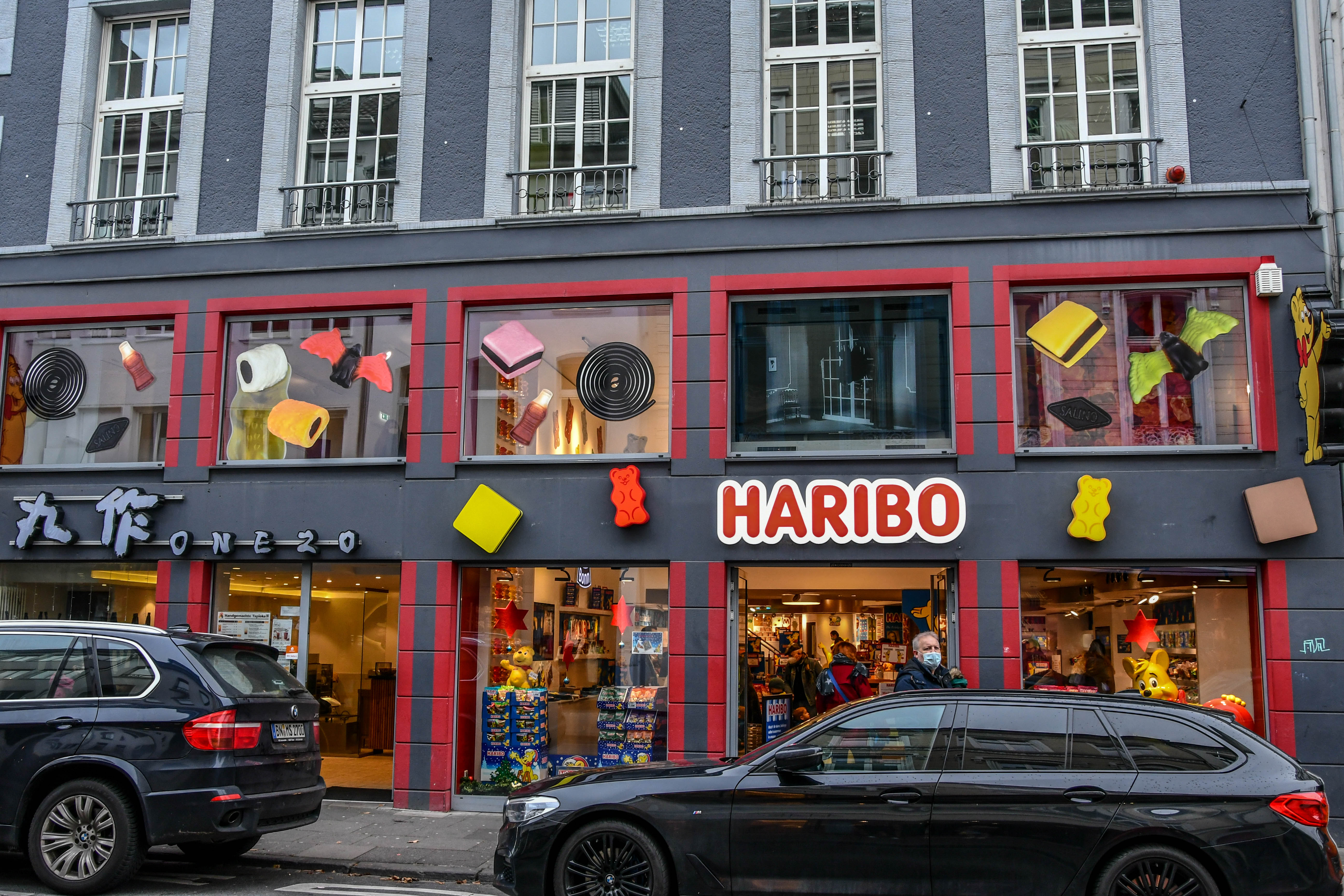
Haribo official outlet shop in Bonn, Germany

In addition to factories, Haribo also operate many official stores around the world.

== Controversies ==
In 2000, Haribo was suspected of having employed forced labourers during World War II. However, the manufacturer denied this and consequently refused to pay into the forced labour fund.

In 2008, the Federal Cartel Office, the body responsible for regulation of market competition in Germany, initiated proceedings against the company and other confectionery manufacturers for illegal price fixing. In 2012, the Federal Cartel Office imposed a fine of a total of 2.4 million euros on Haribo and a responsible sales employee. The reason was anti-competitive agreements with competing companies in which information on negotiations with retailers were exchanged.

Haribo and Swiss chocolatier Lindt were involved in litigation after Haribo accused Lindt of a trademark violation of Lindt's "Gold Teddy" product. After a multi-year battle, Germany’s Federal Court of Justice ruled against Haribo.

Haribo faced international outrage and boycott campaigns in response to the documentary Markencheck that was made and aired in 2017 by German public service broadcaster ARD that investigated modern-day slavery at the carnauba wax plants in Brazil and mistreatment of pigs at farms in Germany. In response, an investigation by Haribo found no evidence of forced labor.

== Slogans ==
Haribo's first slogan was in German: "Haribo macht Kinder froh" ("Haribo makes children happy"). Different slogans are used across the world. They are sung to a jingle in the company's advertisements. The Haribo jingle used in the US and some other countries have been composed by Steve Lee Vickers.

Language	Slogan	Translation
Danish	Luk op for noget godt ... luk op for Haribo! Den er go'	Open up for something good ... open up for Haribo! It is good
Dutch	Haribo voor groot en klein ... zo leuk kan het leven zijn!	Haribo for big and small ... life can be this fun!
English	Kids and grown-ups love it so ... the happy world of Haribo!	
French	Haribo c'est beau la vie ... pour les grands et les petits !	Haribo, life is beautiful ... for the big and the small!
German	Haribo macht Kinder froh ... und Erwachsene ebenso!	Haribo makes children happy ... and adults as well!
Greek	Haribo δίνει χαρά ... σε μεγάλους και παιδιά	Haribo gives joy ... to grown-ups and children
Polish	Haribo smak radości ... dla dzieci i dorosłych!	Haribo taste of joy ... for children and adults!
Italian	Haribo è la bontà ... che si gusta ad ogni età!	Haribo is the goodness ... that is enjoyed at every age!
Japanese	きらきら笑顔 みんなでハリボー！	Sparkling smiles ... everyone together with Haribo!
Norwegian	Luk op for noget godt ... luk op for Haribo!	Open up for something good ... open up for Haribo!
Portuguese (Brazil)	Viva um sabor mágico ... venha ao mundo Haribo!	Experience a magical flavor ... come to the Haribo world!
Spanish	¡Vive un sabor mágico ... ven al mundo Haribo!	Experience a magical flavor ... come to the Haribo world!
Swedish	Haribo är kul för små ... gott för vuxna likaså!	Haribo is fun for little ones ... tasty for adults as well!
Turkish	Çocuk ya da büyük ol ... Haribo'yla mutlu ol!	Be a child or a grown-up ... be happy with Haribo!
