= Friesdorf (Bonn) =

Friesdorf Freesdörp
- Quarter of Bonn
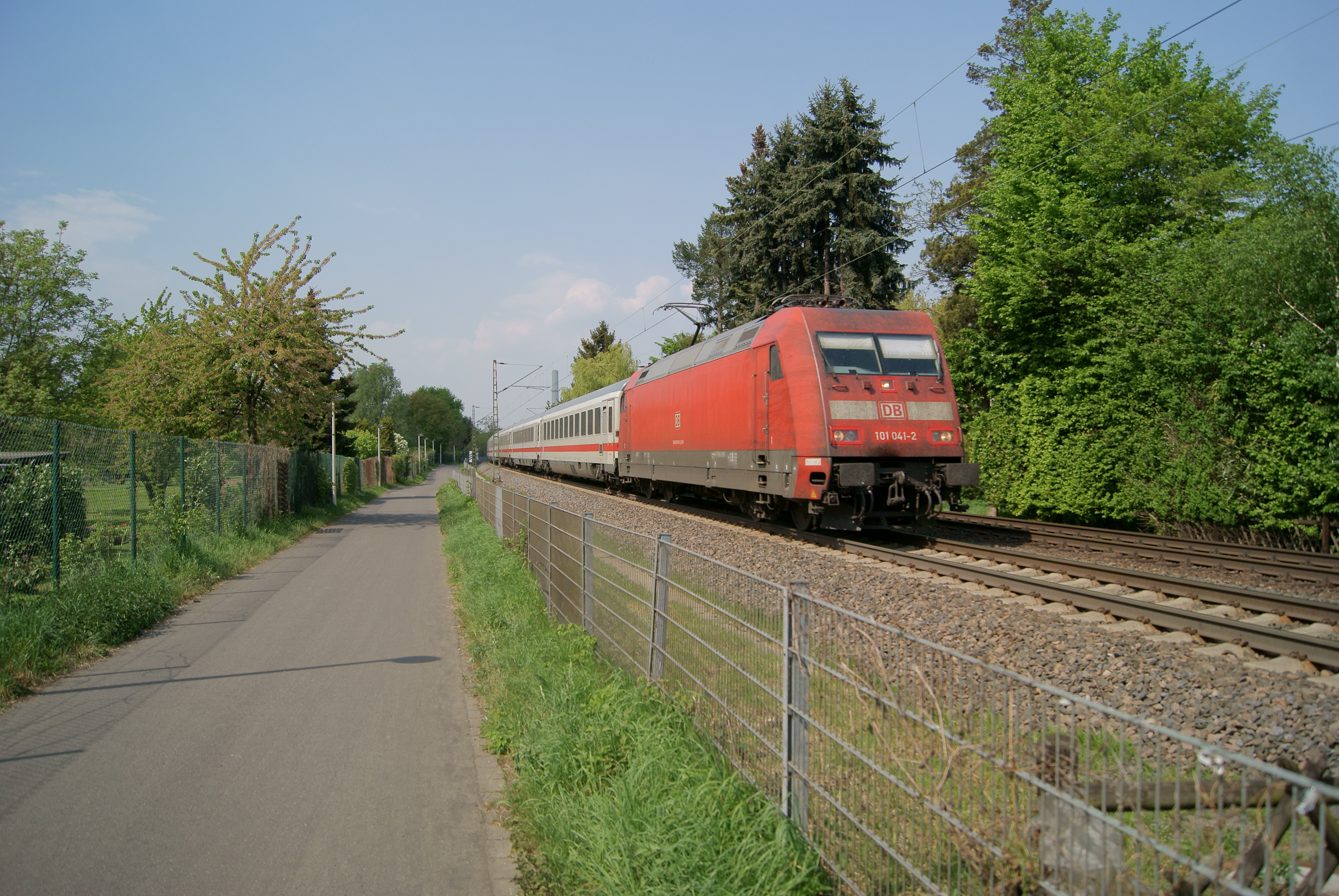
- The German long-distance train "Intercity" on the West Rhine Railway in Bonn
- Interactive map of Friesdorf
- Location within Germany Location within North Rhine-Westphalia
- Coordinates: 50°41′52″N 7°07′42″E
- Country: Germany
- State: North Rhine-Westphalia
- City: Bonn
- Borough: Bad Godesberg

Population (2020-12-31)
  - Total: 8,373
- Time zone: UTC+01:00 (CET)
  - Summer (DST): UTC+02:00 (CEST)
- Dialling codes: 0228
- Vehicle registration: BN

Friesdorf (Kölsch: Freesdörp) is a quarter (Ortsteil) of city district (Stadtbezirk) Bad Godesberg, Bonn, Germany.
