= Trolli =

German candy brand

- Logo since 2022
- Current owner: Mederer GmbH (Europe and Asia); Ferrara Candy Company (United States, Canada, Mexico)
- Country: Germany
- Introduced: 1979; 47 years ago
- Related brands: Efrutti, Herbert's Best
- Markets: Confectionery
- Tagline: Let the fun win / The one for fun!
- Website: Trolli International; Trolli United States

Logo used until 2022

Trolli is a confectionery brand for gummy candies sold in over 80 countries. The brand originated with the German Mederer Group, which owns the brand in the majority of the world, including Europe, Asia, Africa and South America. Mederer's United States business was sold in 1997, and the Trolli trademark in the United States, Canada, and Mexico is now used by Ferrara Candy Company.

== History ==
=== Origins ===
In 1948, Willy Mederer (died 1984) founded Willy Mederer K.G. Zuckerwarenfabrik, a company that initially produced pasta in Fürth, Germany. When post-war sugar rationing regulations were lifted, the company changed production from pasta to confectionery. Candies were sold under the Wilmed brand, a portmanteau of Willy Mederer. In 1984, Willy Mederer died. He was succeeded by his son Herbert.

In 1979, the brand name Trolli der Bär (English Trolli the Bear) was registered, which was shortened to Trolli in the following years. During the 1980s, Trolli became active in both the German and United States confectionery markets. Trolli varieties were added, including sour flavors, double-layered gummies with foam made using starch mogul machines and the "Trolli-Burger". Mederer received the 1993 Candy Kettle Award.

=== In the United States ===
In the 1980s, Trolli exports to North America grew to 40 tons per day, and in 1986, Mederer built a production facility in Creston, Iowa. In 1997, Mederer sold Trolli's United States operations to Favorite Brands International. The United States operations and trademark rights were subsequently owned by Nabisco (1999), Kraft Foods (2000), Wrigleys (2005), and Farley's & Sathers Candy Company (2006) which was merged with Ferrara Candy Company in 2013, which still holds the American rights to Trolli as of 2026.

In 2004, Trolli introduced a roadkill themed gummy candy in the shape of chickens, squirrels, and snakes with tire tracks on them. Kraft Foods, then the owner of the Trolli United States brand, pulled the candy from the market in 2005 in response to protests.

=== Europe and Asia ===
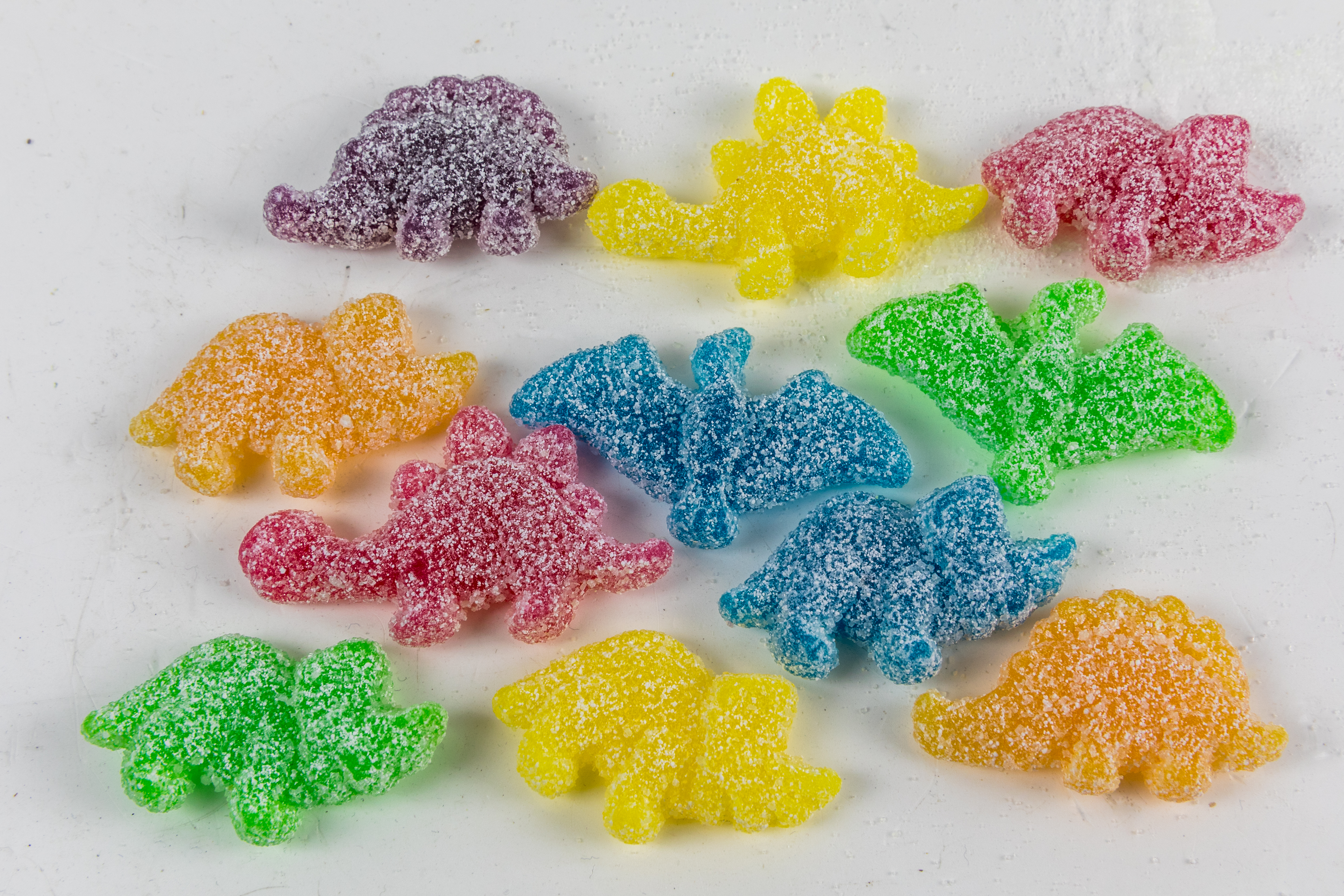
Trolli gummi dinosaur

In 1994, Mederer founded a subsidiary, Trolli Iberica S.A., in Valencia, Spain. A production site was opened in Jakarta, Indonesia, in 1997; it was later sold again in the 2000s. Between 1995 and 2013, the Mederer Group also operated a packaging plant in Plzeň, Czech Republic.

Efrutti logo

Efruti, a fruit gummy brand from Neunburg vorm Wald, was acquired by the Mederer Group in 1998; its name was subsequently adapted to eFrutti and continued as a brand. Two years later, the company Gummi Bear Factory, with production facilities in Boizenburg and Hagenow in Mecklenburg-Vorpommern, was acquired from the Barry-Callebaut Group. At the beginning of 2012, the three previously independent companies in Germany (in Fürth, Neunburg vorm Wald, and Hagenow) were merged and rebranded as Trolli GmbH, which itself is part of the Mederer Group. In 2015, the production facility in Boizenburg was sold to The European Candy Group (TECG).

Mederer Group is still owned by the Mederer family, including Herbert Mederer, the founder's son.

== Ownership and sites ==
Company logo Mederer Group

While the Ferrara Candy Company owns the trademark rights for Trolli in the United States, Canada, and Mexico, Trolli GmbH, as part of the Mederer Group, holds the rights in Europe, Asia, Africa and South America. The Trolli GmbH has its headquarters in Fürth, and has production sites in Neunburg vorm Wald and Hagenow, Germany. In Europe, Trolli GmbH owns a further manufacturing plant in Valencia, Spain. In 2001, the company expanded into China and established a joint venture with the Spanish company Multi Joyco in Guangzhou, including another production facility. In 2004, Mederer acquired full ownership. From China, Trolli exports its products to nations in Asia, Australasia and the Middle East.

== Products ==
The product portfolio includes a variety of sour, fruity, vegan, and soft gummy candies.

== Sponsorship ==
Trolli GmbH sponsored the football club SpVgg Greuther Fürth from 2010 to 2014, during which time their home stadium was named the Trolli Arena.

In 2016, Trolli began sponsoring James Harden and launched candies modeled after his face and beard, later followed by ones based on his personal line of Adidas shoes.

== See also ==
- List of confectionery brands
