= List of theatres in North Rhine-Westphalia =

This is a list of notable theatres in the German state of North Rhine-Westphalia, organized by administrative district.

== Rhineland ==
=== Region of Düsseldorf ===
- Burgtheater Dinslaken – Dinslaken
- Die Säule – Duisburg
- Fabrik Heeder – Krefeld
- Freilichtbühne Mülheim an der Ruhr – Mülheim
- Krieewelsche Pappköpp – Krefeld
- Metronom Theater – Oberhausen
- Rheinisches Landestheater Neuss – Neuss
- Schlosstheater Moers – Moers
- TAM – Krefeld
- Teo Otto Theater – Remscheid
- Theater am Marientor – Duisburg
- Theater an der Ruhr – Mülheim
- Theater Duisburg – Duisburg
- Theater Oberhausen – Oberhausen
- Werner-Jaeger-Halle – Nettetal
- XOX-Theater Kleve – Kleve

==== City of Düsseldorf ====
- Altes Schauspielhausgebäude Düsseldorf
- Altes Theater
- Apollo-Theater
- Capitol Theater
- Deutsche Oper am Rhein
- Düsseldorfer Marionetten-Theater
- Düsseldorfer Schauspielhaus
- Forum Freies Theater
- Kom(m)ödchen
- Komödie Düsseldorf
- Palais Wittgenstein
- Stadttheater Düsseldorf
- Theater FLIN

==== City of Essen ====
- Aalto Theatre
- Colosseum Theater
- Das Kleine Theater Essen
- GOP Varieté Essen
- Grillo-Theater

==== City of Wuppertal ====
- Comödie
- Das Vollplaybacktheater
- Kulturzentrum Bandfabrik
- Müllers Marionetten-Theater
- Opernhaus Wuppertal
- Rex-Theater
- Schauspielhaus Wuppertal
- Thalia-Theater
- Theater in Cronenberg
- Wupper-Theater
- Wuppertaler Bühnen

=== Region of Cologne ===
- Grenzlandtheater Aachen – Aachen
- Öcher Schängche – Aachen
- Opernwerkstatt am Rhein – Hürth
- Puppenpavillon Bensberg – Bergisch Gladbach
- Stadttheater Düren – Düren
- Studiobühne Siegburg – Siegburg
- Theater Aachen – Aachen
- Violettas Puppenbühne – Wegberg

==== City of Bonn ====
- Contra-Kreis-Theater
- Euro Theater Central Bonn
- Junges Theater Bonn
- Theater Bonn

==== City of Cologne ====
- Arkadaş Theater
- Bühnen der Stadt Köln
- Cassiopeia Theater
- D.a.S. Theater
- Futur3
- Gloria-Theater
- Hänneschen-Theater
- Kumede
- Musical Dome
- Schauspiel Köln
- Senftöpfchen
- Studiobühne Köln
- Tazzelwurm (Varieté)
- Theater am Dom
- Theater Tiefrot
- Volkstheater Millowitsch

== Westfalen-Lippe ==
=== Region of Arnsberg ===
- Apollo-Theater
- Fletch Bizzel
- Freilichtbühne Herdringen
- Hagen Theatre
- Hansa Theater Hörde
- Kulturhaus Lüdenscheid
- Mondpalast
- Prinz-Regent-Theater
- Rottstraße 5 Theater
- Schauspielhaus Bochum

=== Region of Detmold ===
- Detmolder Sommertheater
- Kahle Wart
- Landestheater Detmold
- Stadttheater Herford
- Stadttheater Minden
- Theater Gütersloh
- Westfälische Kammerspiele

=== Region of Munster ===
- Alte Brennerei Schwake
- Freilichtbühne Billerbeck
- Musiktheater im Revier
- Theater im Pumpenhaus
- Theater Münster
- Westfälisches Landestheater
- Wolfgang Borchert Theater
