= Timeline of Essen =

Coordinates: 51.450833°N 7.013056°E

The following is a timeline of the history of the city of Essen, Germany.

== Prior to 19th century ==
- 845 – Essen Abbey founded (approximate date).
- 971 – Mathilde, granddaughter of Otto I becomes abbess of Essen Abbey.
- 1012 – Sophia, daughter of Otto II becomes abbottess of the Essen Stift.
- 1041 – Essen receives rights to a market.
- 1244 – The association of the ministeriales of the Essen Abbey and the citizens of the town of Essen arrange for the Essen town walls to be erected.
- 1316 – Essen Minster (church) dedicated.
- 1390 – Essener Schützenverein (militia) formed.
- 1598 – Borbeck Castle rebuilt.
- 1736 – Neueste Essendische Nachrichten von Staats- und Gelehrten Sachen (Newest Essen News of State and Learned Matters) newspaper begins publication.
- 1797 – G. D. Baedeker Verlag bookseller in business.

== 19th century ==
- 1802 – Area occupied by Prussian troops.
- 1803
  - Essen Abbey secularized.
  - Franz Dinnendahl builds steam engine.
- 1810 – Krupp foundry in business.
- 1814 – Town becomes part of Prussia.
- 1822 – Town becomes part of the Rhine Province.
- 1841 – Simon Hirschland Bank in business.
- 1847 – Essen-Bergeborbeck station opens.
- 1849 – Population: 8,813.
- 1851 – Zollverein Coal Mine begins operating.
- 1862 – Essen Hauptbahnhof and Essen-Borbeck station open.
- 1866 – Fredebeul & Koenen booksellers in business.
- 1870 – Synagogue consecrated.
- 1871 – Town becomes part of the German Empire.
- 1872 – Neu-Westend developed.
- 1873 – Villa Hügel (Krupp residence) built.
- 1875 – Population: 54,790.
- 1880 – Historical Society for the City and Convent of Essen founded.
- 1881
  - Essener Turnerbund athletic club formed.
  - Beiträge zur Geschichte von Stadt und Stift Essen (journal of city history) begins publication.
- 1886 – Photographische Genossenschaft von Essen (photography group) founded.

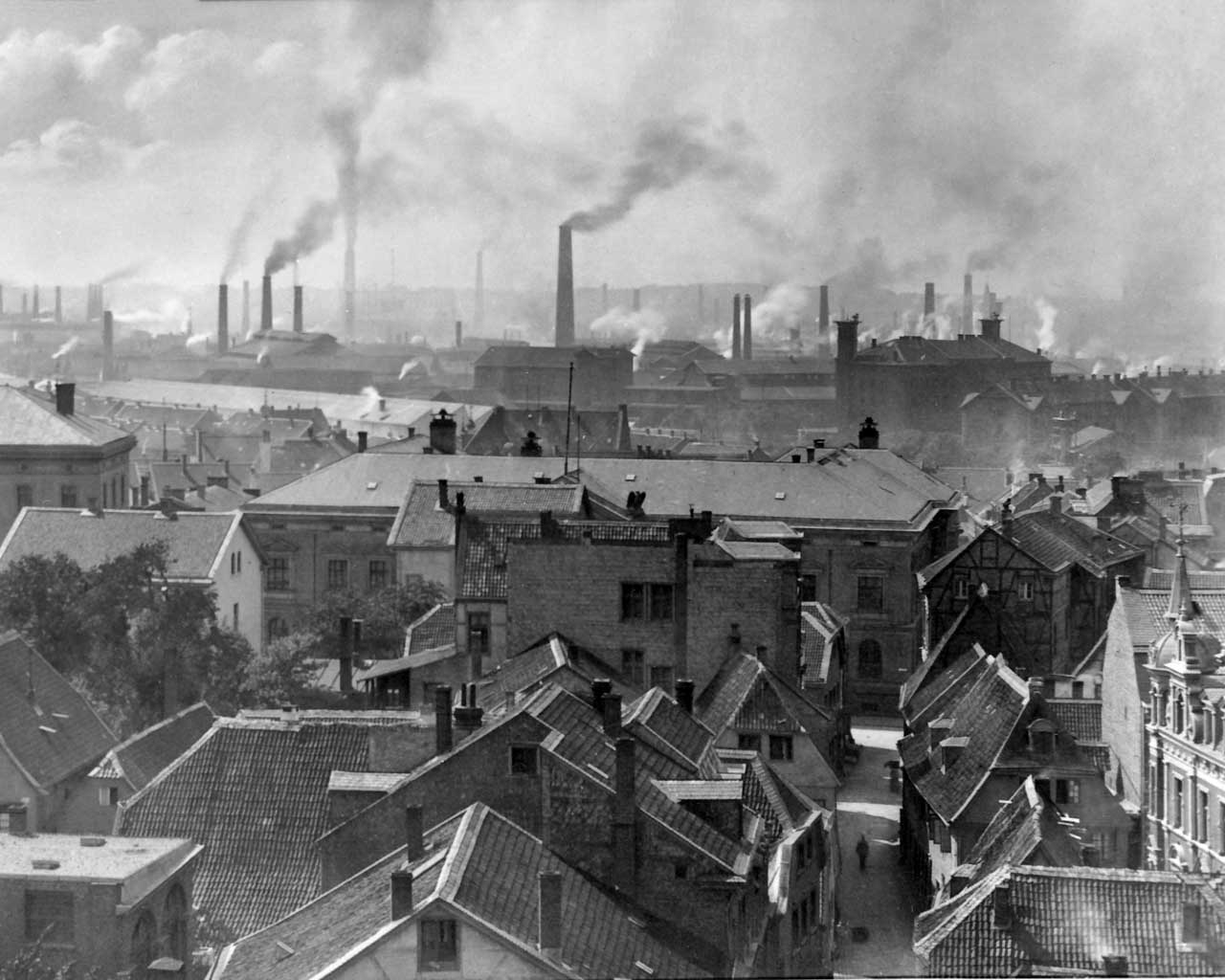
City centre with factories in the background in the 1890s

- 1892 – City Theatre opens.
- 1893
  - Electric tram begins operating.
  - Rhenish-Westphalian Coal Syndicate headquartered in Essen.
- 1898 – Krupp's Essener Hof (hotel) built.
- 1899 – Essen Philharmonic Orchestra founded.

== 20th century ==
=== 1900s–1940s ===
- 1901
  - Folkwang Museum founded.
  - Heinrich Koppers AG in business.
- 1905 – Population: 229,270.
- 1906
  - Essen Art Museum founded.
  - Gartenstadt Margarethenhöhe developed.
- 1908 – Moltkeviertel development begins.
- 1913
  - New Synagogue built.
  - Albrecht's shop in business (later Aldi chain supermarket).
- 1920 – Consulate of Poland opens.
- 1922 – Uhlenkrugstadion (stadium) built.

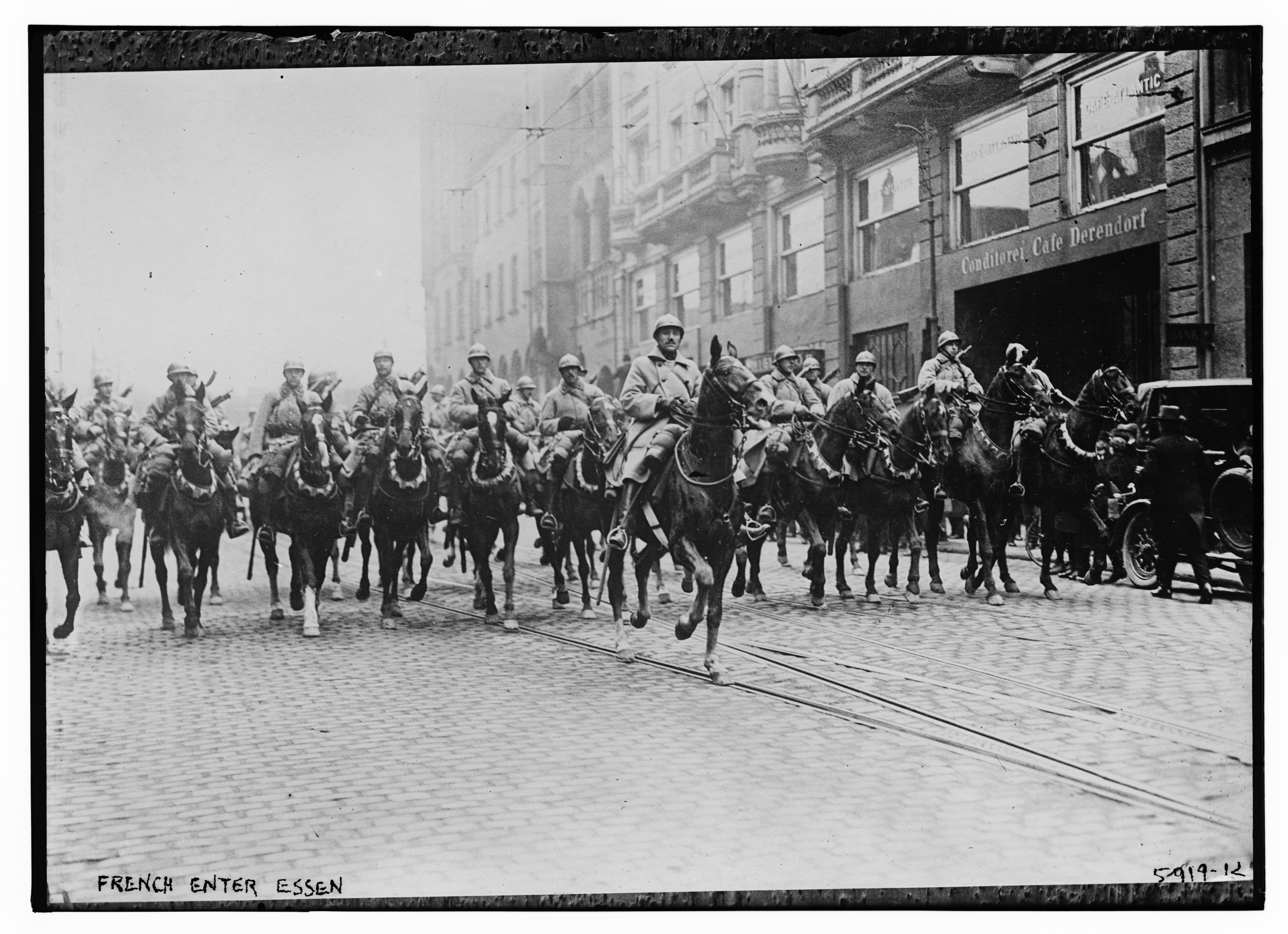
French troops enter Essen, 1923

- 1923
  - Rot-Weiss Essen football club active.
  - French troops enter the city.
- 1924 – Filmstudio Glückauf (cinema) opens.
- 1925 – Essen/Mülheim Airport opens.
- 1927 – Grugapark Botanical Garden and Folkwang School for the arts open.
- 1928 – Lichtburg Playhouse (cinema) opens.
- 1929 – Werden becomes part of city.
- 1932 – Zollverein Mine Shaft 12 built.
- 1933 – Theodor Reismann-Grone becomes mayor.
- 1936 – Consulate of Poland relocated to Düsseldorf.
- 1937 – Just Dillgardt becomes mayor.
- 1939 – Stadion an der Hafenstraße (stadium) built.
- 1942 – March: Bombing of Essen by Allied forces begins.
- 1944
  - 2 January: Schwarze Poth forced labour camp established by the SS. Its prisoners were mostly Russians and Poles.
  - 17 May: Schwarze Poth forced labour camp converted into a subcamp of the Buchenwald concentration camp.
  - August: Humboldtstraße subcamp of the Buchenwald concentration camp established. Its prisoners were mostly Jewish women.
- 1945
  - March: Schwarze Poth and Humboldtstraße subcamps of Buchenwald dissolved. Prisoners deported to the main Buchenwald camp.
  - March: Bombing of Essen by Allied forces ends.
- 1946 – City becomes part of North Rhine-Westphalia.
- 1948
  - Westdeutsche Allgemeine Zeitung (newspaper) begins publication.
  - Labour strike.
- 1949
  - Essen I, Essen II, and Essen III parliamentary districts created.
  - Hans Toussaint becomes mayor.

=== 1950s–1990s ===
- 1951 – Amerikahaus built.
- 1957 – Roman Catholic Diocese of Essen founded.
- 1958 – Grugahalle sports arena opens.
- 1961 – Sammlung Industrieform (museum) opens.
- 1962 – City hosts the 1962 European Judo Championships.
- 1965
  - City hosts Bundesgartenschau (national horticulture biennial).
  - Little Theatre founded.
- 1968 – Essen Motor Show begins.

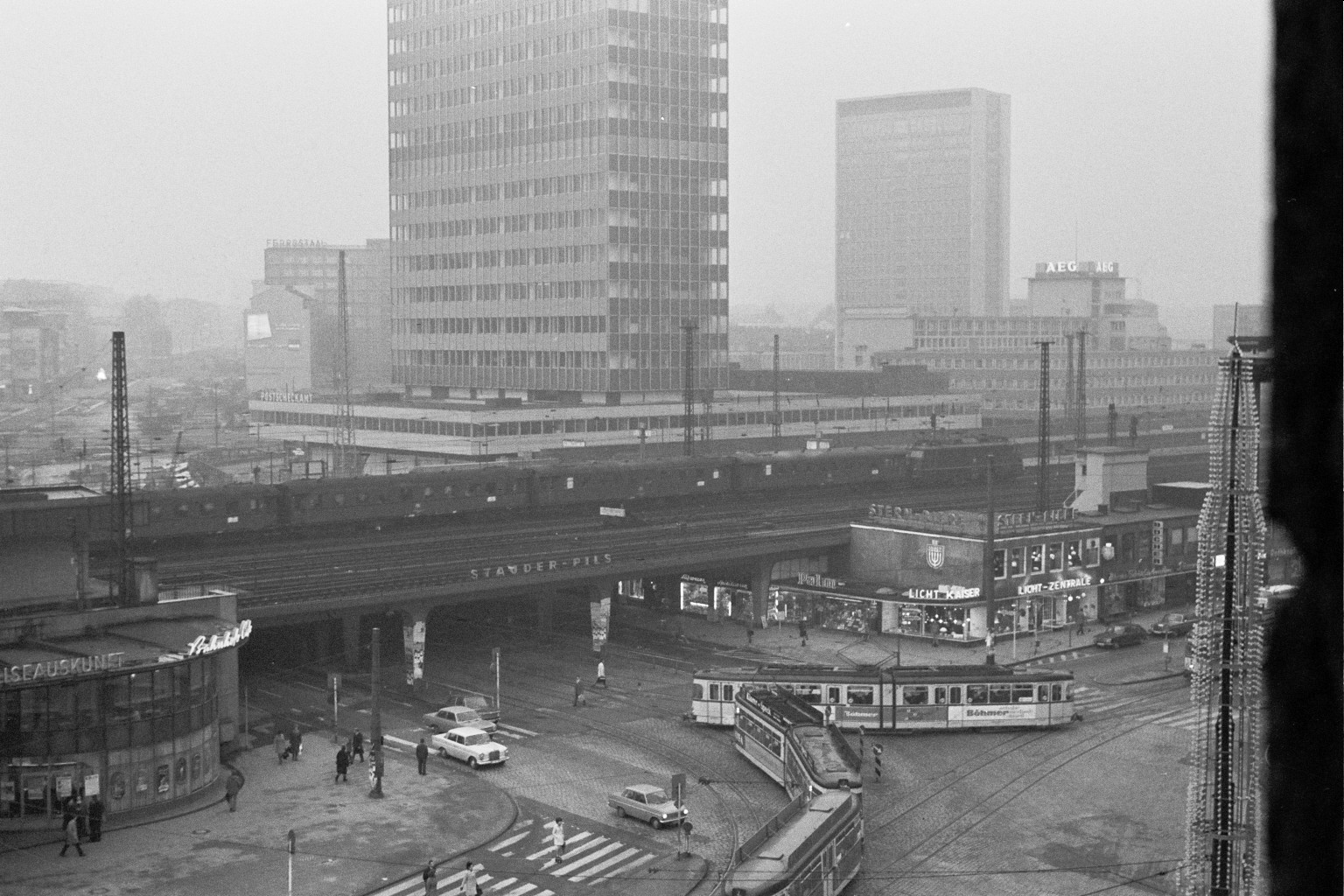
Essen in 1970

- 1975 – Kettwig becomes part of city.
- 1979 – Essen City Hall built.
- 1983 – Spiel, world's biggest non-electronic game trade fair begins.
- 1988 – Aalto Theatre opens.
- 1989 – Annette Jäger becomes mayor.
- 1991 – Offener Kanal Essen television begins broadcasting.
- 1993 – City hosts the 1993 World Fencing Championships.
- 1994 – Stratmanns Theater Europahaus opens.
- 1996 – GOP Varieté Essen theatre opens.
- 1997 – Red Dot Design Museum active.
- 1999
  - ThyssenKrupp conglomerate headquartered in city.
  - Wolfgang Reiniger becomes mayor.
- 2000 – SGS Essen football club formed.

== 21st century ==
- 2001 – Zollverein Coal Mine Industrial Complex becomes a UNESCO World Heritage Site.
- 2002 – Abu Ali group, a jihadist cell with plans to bomb Jewish sites in Germany was arrested by the authorities
- 2003 – University of Duisburg-Essen established.
- 2009 – Reinhard Paß elected mayor.
- 2010 – City designated that year's European Capital of Culture on behalf of the entire Ruhr area.
- 2012
  - Stadion Essen (stadium) opens.
  - Population: 566,862.
- 2014 – June: Storm.
- 2015 – Thomas Kufen, CDU, becomes mayor.
- 2017 - City designated that year's European Green Capital.

== See also ==
- History of Essen
- List of mayors of Essen
- History of the Ruhr, includes timeline
- Urbanization in the German Empire
- Timelines of other cities in the state of North Rhine-Westphalia:^{(de)} Aachen, Bonn, Cologne, Dortmund, Duisburg, Düsseldorf, Münster

== Bibliography ==
=== in English ===
- "Essen". Handbook for North Germany. London: J. Murray. 1877.
- "Essen", Bradshaw's Illustrated Hand-book to Germany and Austria, London: W.J. Adams & Sons, 1896
- "Essen", Northern Germany (15th ed.), Leipzig: Karl Baedeker, 1910, OCLC 78390379
- "Essen" . Encyclopædia Britannica. Vol. 9 (11th ed.). 1911. pp. 778–779.
- Eric D. Weitz (1985). "Social Continuity and Political Radicalization: Essen in the World War I Era". Social Science History. 9 (1): 49–69. doi:10.1017/s0145553200020307. JSTOR 1170918.
- John M. Jeep, ed. (2001). "Essen". Medieval Germany: an Encyclopedia. Garland Publishing. ISBN 0-8240-7644-3.
- K. James-Chakraborty (2008). "Inventing Industrial Culture in Essen". In Gavriel David Rosenfeld; Paul B. Jaskot (eds.). Beyond Berlin: Twelve German Cities Confront the Nazi Past. USA: University of Michigan Press. pp. 116+. ISBN 978-0-472-11611-9 – via HathiTrust. (fulltext)

=== in German ===
- F. Ph. Funcke (1848), Geschichte des Fürstenthums und der Stadt Essen [History of the principality and the city of Essen] (in German), H. Kamp, OCLC 38688441, OL 20454145M
- Paul Clemen, ed. (1893). Kunstdenkmäler der Stadt und des Kreises Essen. Die Kunstdenkmäler der Rheinprovinz (in German). Vol. 2. Dusseldorf: Schwann.
- T. Kellen (1902). Industriestadt Essen in Wort und Bild (in German). Essen-Ruhr: Fredebeul & Koenen.
- P. Krauss; E. Uetrecht, eds. (1913). "Essen". Meyers Deutscher Städteatlas [Meyer's Atlas of German Cities] (in German). Leipzig: Bibliographisches Institut.
- Essen, Deutscher Städteatlas (in German), vol. 4, Institut für vergleichende Städtegeschichte, 1989, ISBN 3891150008
