= Children's opera =

Children's opera refers to musical theatre productions for a children's audience. This includes operas specifically designed for performance by children, as well as operas composed by children themselves. Furthermore, institutions, venues, or program series specializing in such works are often called children's opera.

Children's operas are intended to introduce children to the world of opera. They can have plots primarily aimed at children – fairytale-like or other, they can include age-appropriate music, have educational themes, and be intended for performance in schools or for children's media programming. The line between children's opera and children's ballet is often blurred.

== History ==
Some of the Jesuit school dramas of the 17th and 18th centuries were intended for children. In this sense, Mozart's classical opera with a religious background, Apollo et Hyacinthus (1767), is still a piece by a child for children. More modern schulopern developed from this genre.

Children's opera as a genre only began to develop at the end of the 19th century. The most famous work is Hansel and Gretel (1893) by Engelbert Humperdinck, which is still performed by many German-speaking city theaters at Christmastime. In the 20th century, a children's play or Christmas fairy tale was part of the repertoire of many opera houses, partly to introduce young audiences to the theater and partly to make money, as performances were usually well-attended. Few of these seasonal pieces survived after their premiere.

Routine productions of dubious artistic quality drew criticism, especially for fairy-tale operas, leading to efforts at renewal in the interwar period, such as Kurt Weill's didactic piece Der Jasager (1930) or Paul Hindemith's Wir bauen eine Stadt (1930). Children's operas were frequently used as vehicles for ideologies, which in turn gave rise to criticism.

In 1938, Albert Jenny composed the fairy-tale opera Der Rubin (The Ruby) in three acts, for solo voices, choir and orchestra, to the libretto of the same name by Friedrich Hebbel, for the school stage.

Hans Krásas composed in 1938 the children's opera Brundibár, which premiered in 1941 in a Jewish children's home in Prague and was performed again in the Theresienstadt concentration camp after the composer's deportation. The German premiere only took place in 1985 after the opera's rediscovery in the 1970s.

The influences of jazz and pop music since the 1950s have led to hybrid forms between opera and musical. Andrew Lloyd Webber's Joseph and the Amazing Technicolor Dreamcoat (1968) has been described as Schuldrama.

The most popular versions are still adaptations of well-known pieces as children's operas, such as Mozart's The Magic Flute.

== Institutions ==
=== State and municipal children's opera establishments ===
Today, there is a tendency to exclude children's operas from the standard operatic repertoire and leave them to specialized ensembles. The first children's opera in Europe was established in 1996. This children's opera, then called the Yakult Hall, was located in the Cologne Opera House—a miniature opera house set up in the foyer—and became a model for similar institutions in other cities. Due to the renovation of the opera house, the Cologne Children's Opera moved to be performing in its temporary venue, the Altes Pfandhaus (Old Pawnshop) in the Südstadt district (approximately 200 meters from Chlodwigplatz). Afterward, it is planned to have its own dedicated space within the main opera house again.

Since Christoph Meyer's tenure as artistic director began in 2009, the Deutsche Oper am Rhein has presented a children's opera annually at the Theater Duisburg and the Oper Düsseldorf. At the start of the 2013/14 season, the Deutsche Oper am Rhein, the Oper Dortmund, and the Theater Bonn launched a collaboration entitled "Junge Opern Rhein-Ruhr" (Young Opera Rhine-Ruhr). The three institutions jointly commission world premieres of major children's operas. As part of this collaboration, Marius Felix Lange's Vom Mädchen, das nicht schlafen wollte (The Girl Who Didn't Want to Sleep), with a libretto by Martin Baltscheit, premiered in 2014. This was followed in 2015 by Jörn Arnecke's family opera Ronja Räubertochter (Ronja the Robber's Daughter), based on Astrid Lindgren's children's book (libretto by Holger Potocki), and finally, on April 23, 2016, Marius Felix Lange's Die Schneekönigin (The Snow Queen), with a libretto by the composer, based on the story by Hans Christian Andersen, premiered.

"Opera piccola" of Hamburgische Staatsoper celebrated its tenth anniversary in 2011. From 2001 to 2011, performances took place at Kampnagel. From 2012 to 2016, children's operas were performed at the Opera stabile (the small stage of the State Opera).

Theater Dortmund's Kinderoper Dortmund was opened on 5 May 2008.

From 1999 to 2014, the Vienna State Opera children's opera was housed in a tent on the roof of the opera house, where 31 in-house productions and more than 2000 performances were given. The State Opera's children's opera moved to the Walfischgasse City Theatre in autumn 2015. Théâtre national du Luxembourg plays since 2003 every year a children's opera.

Deutsche Oper Berlin plays their KinderMusikTheater in the foyer of their opera house.

Staatsoper Berlin's Junge Staatsoper plays since 2010 in the workshop of Schiller Theater two children's operas and one Jugendoper (youth's opera) per season.

=== Private children's opera establishments ===
Das Theater für Kinder (est. 1968) began in 1979 in Hamburg. Since then, almost every season has featured a new opera production adapted in-house. In addition, a theatre education training program for teachers has been offered since 2003.

Since 1984, the Theater Kontra-Punkt in Düsseldorf has presented musical theatre for children. From the very beginning, the theatre's work has been rooted in the tradition of Stravinsky. Kontra-Punkt is one of the first theatres to initiate co-productions between schools and professional institutions such as municipal symphony orchestras. Since 2007, the Cologne Chamber Opera has performed seven to ten different children's operas annually, accompanied by educational programs, in its own small opera house in Rodenkirchen district. Numerous workshops, concerts, and galas complement the program.

Bayreuth Festival also offers operas for children every year. The project initiated by Katharina Wagner started in 2009 with Holländer für Kinder and has been an integral part of the festival ever since.

=== Tournee circuit ===
The Theater Kontra-Punkt founded in Düsseldorf in its early years developed small musical theatre works for children and young people for the Berlin Senate. This was followed by a series of commissioned compositions, such as Schlimmes Ende (Bad End) after Philip Ardagh, with music by Hauke Berheide, and, after the 1849 fairy tale by Theodor Storm, Der kleine Häwelmann (Little Häwelmann) by the same composer. These productions were presented to an international audience at the Düsseldorf Opera Festival, "6-Tage-Oper" (6-Day Opera).

Since 1990, the Kleine Oper Bad Homburg has been touring Germany, presenting professional classical music theatre for children.

Founded in 1994, the Kinderoper Papageno is a group of young graduates from the Konservatorium Wien and the University of Music and Performing Arts Vienna, who perform Peter Pacher's plays based on classical works as a touring theatre company.

The non-profit organization Musikforum Niedersachsen e. V. was founded in December 1999 in Hanover by opera singer Almuth Marianne Kroll with the aim of promoting cultural education through musical theatre. The organization is now based in Braunschweig and has a contact point in the district of Wolfenbüttel. Its focus is on performances for and with children and young people in theatres, but also in schools.

The non-profit organization JO! – Junge Oper, founded in 2004, produces operas, musical theatre and multi-day workshops for children and young people in German-speaking countries with professional opera singers.

The children's opera PICCOLINO Vienna offers opera and ballet performances as well as music workshops for children. It now tours throughout Austria, Germany, and South Tyrol.

Established in 2002, Junge Musiktheater Hamburg (JMH) is a tournee theater that performs operas adapted for children.

Taschenoper Lübeck (Lübeck Pocket Opera) was founded in 2004 and has produced a new work annually since then. It has collaborated with the Theater Lübeck since 2006, where it also premieres its productions. In addition, it performs in schools and at festivals. In 2010, it received the Rheingau Music Prize at the Rheingau Musik Festival.

Since 1996, the Cologne Young Chamber Opera has also been touring throughout the German-speaking world with its own original children's operas, written and adapted by the ensemble. Each year, an opera or operetta production for adults is also added to the repertoire in collaboration with the Cologne Symphony Orchestra.

Since 2009, the TourneeOper e.V. (since 2024 Opernretter GmbH) has been performing nationwide in primary schools and kindergartens as well as in guest theatres with its own children's opera programs and a fire prevention piece.

Opernwerkstatt am Rhein performs not only children's operas but also cabaret-style opera programs.

== Sources ==
- Isolde Schmid-Reiter (ed.): Kinderoper. Ästhetische Herausforderung und pädagogische Verpflichtung. ConBrio, Regensburg 2004, ISBN 3-932581-64-4.
- Elke Heidenreich, Christian Schuller: Das geheime Königreich. Oper für Kinder Köln. Kiepenheuer & Witsch 2007, ISBN 978-3-462-03959-7.
- Brigitte Regler-Bellinger: Internationales Musiktheater für Kinder und Jugendliche: Musikführer und Dokumentation zu 900 Opern, Operetten, Singspielen und Musicals sowie vielen anderen Formen. Haag und Herchen, Frankfurt/M. 1990, ISBN 3-89228-495-4.
- Brigitte Regler-Bellinger: "Kinder- und Jugendmusiktheater". In: Die Musik in Geschichte und Gegenwart [MGG]. 2nd revised ed. Kassel: Bärenreiter, vol. 5, 1996, cols. 43–59.
