= Lydia Schamschula =

German actress (born 1981)

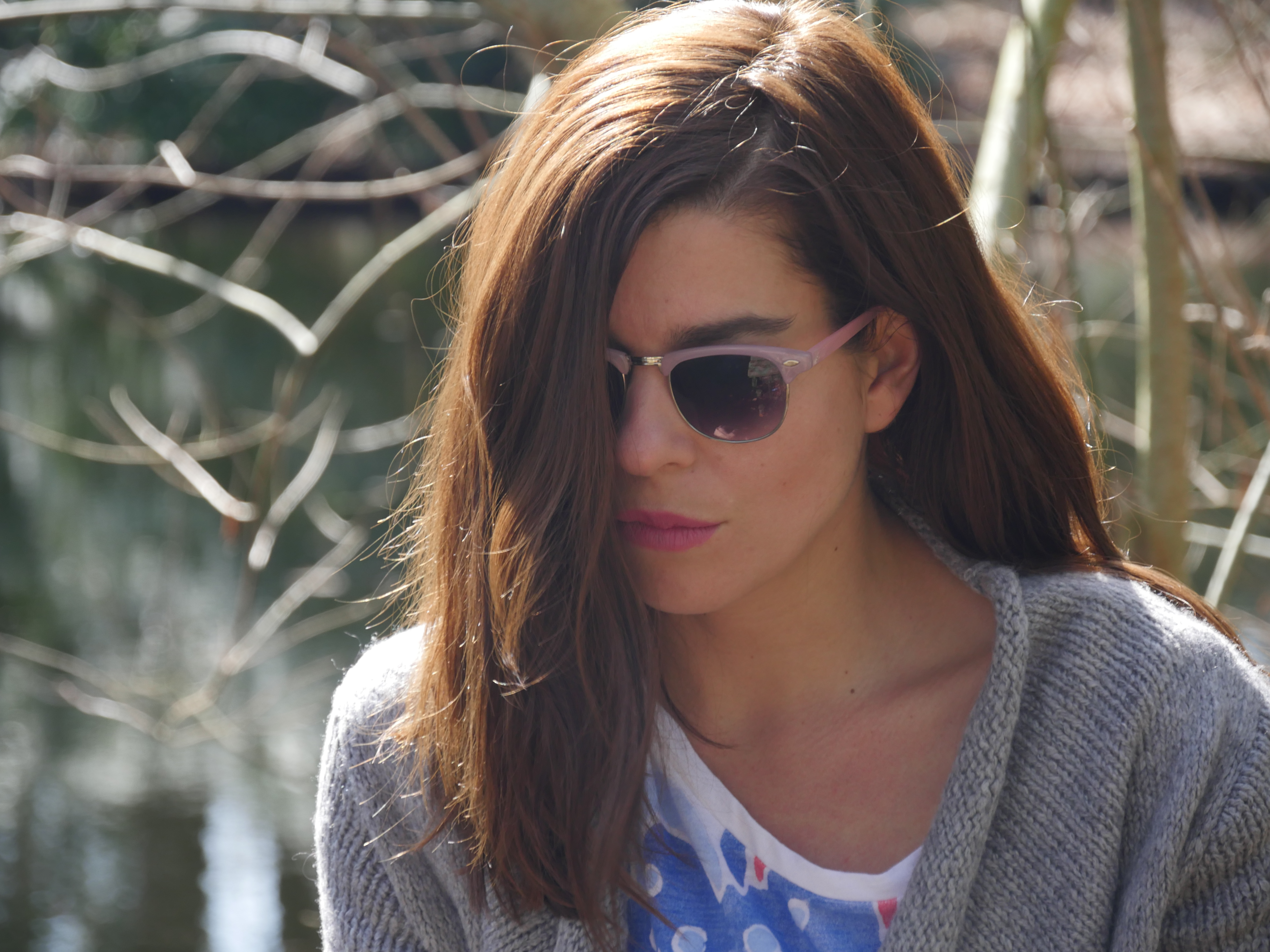
Lydia Schamschula (2016)

Lydia Schamschula (born 20 March 1981 in Darmstadt, Germany) is a German actress.

At the beginning of her career Schamschula worked at various theater houses in Germany, including the Schauspielhaus Frankfurt, the Prinz-Regent-Theater in Bochum and at the Bad Hersfelder Festspiele in Bad Hersfeld, Hesse. She also appeared in numerous television shows and movies.

== Theater ==
- 2011–2013: Prinz Regent Theater Bochum, “Buddenbrooks”, Producer: Sibylle Broll-Pape, Role: Tony Buddenbrook
- 2012: Festspiele Bad Hersfeld, “Das Dschungelbuch”, Producer: Janusz Kica, Role: Affenmutter/ Wolfsmutter

== Filmography ==
- 2003: Aturo Ui, Producer: Kerstin Hering
- 2004: Not a Love Story
- 2005: Die rote Harfe (short film), Producer: Antonia Jäger
- 2006: Austern ohne Schale, Producer: Jette Müller
- 2006: Eine kleine Geschichte über die Liebe, Producer: Adel Youkhanna
- 2007: Das Haus am Waldesrand, Producer: Markus von Känel
- 2008: They Call us Candy Girls (Internet series, 10 episodes)
- 2008: Distanz (short firm), Producer: Moritz Richard
- 2009: Pope Joan, Producer: Sönke Wortmann
- 2009: Ein Fall für zwei (television series, episode Tod im Weinberg), Producer: Boris Keidies
- 2009: Blutsbrüder (Internet series, 12 episodes), Producer: Til Obladen
- 2011, 2014: Leipzig Homicide (TV series, various roles, 2 episodes)
- 2011: In Mitte ist der Himmel immer blau (short film), Producer: Jan Becker
- 2011: Salto, Producer: Maximilian Moll
- 2012: A Woman in Berlin (short film), Producer: Jeremy Glaholt
- 2013: Heiter bis tödlich: Zwischen den Zeilen (TV series, episode Zu viel Zukunft ist auch nicht gut), Producer: Klaus Knoesel
- 2014: Verbotene Liebe (TV series, 2 episodes)
- 2015: Einfach Rosa – Die Hochzeitsplanerin (TV series), Producer: Holger Haase
- 2017: Happy Burnout, Producer: André Erkau
- 2018: Nord Nord Mord – Clüver und der leise Tod (TV series)
- 2022: Tár — Lina Greff
