= Der kleine Häwelmann (film) =

1956 short film

- Directed by: Rolf Cichon
- Written by: Robert Cichon; Herbert K. Schulz; Theodor Storm (book)
- Starring: Brigitte Sorgatz; Christoph Georgi
- Cinematography: Erich Günther
- Edited by: Wera Cleve
- Music by: Hans-Hendrik Wehding
- Release date: 1956
- Running time: 18 minutes
- Country: East Germany
- Language: German

Der kleine Häwelmann (Little Havelman) is an East German short film based on the fairy tale of the same name. It was released in 1956.

== Synopsis ==
A mother tells her child called Little Havelman a story to make him fall asleep. He is bored which is why he rides through the city in his bed. Everyone else is sleeping. He keeps riding into the sky and knocks the stars and moon out of their place, and the moon doesn't want to shine for him anymore. Finally, Little Havelman falls asleep too.
