= Stratmanns Theater Europahaus =

Theatre in Essen, Germany

Coordinates: 51°27′22″N 7°00′39″E

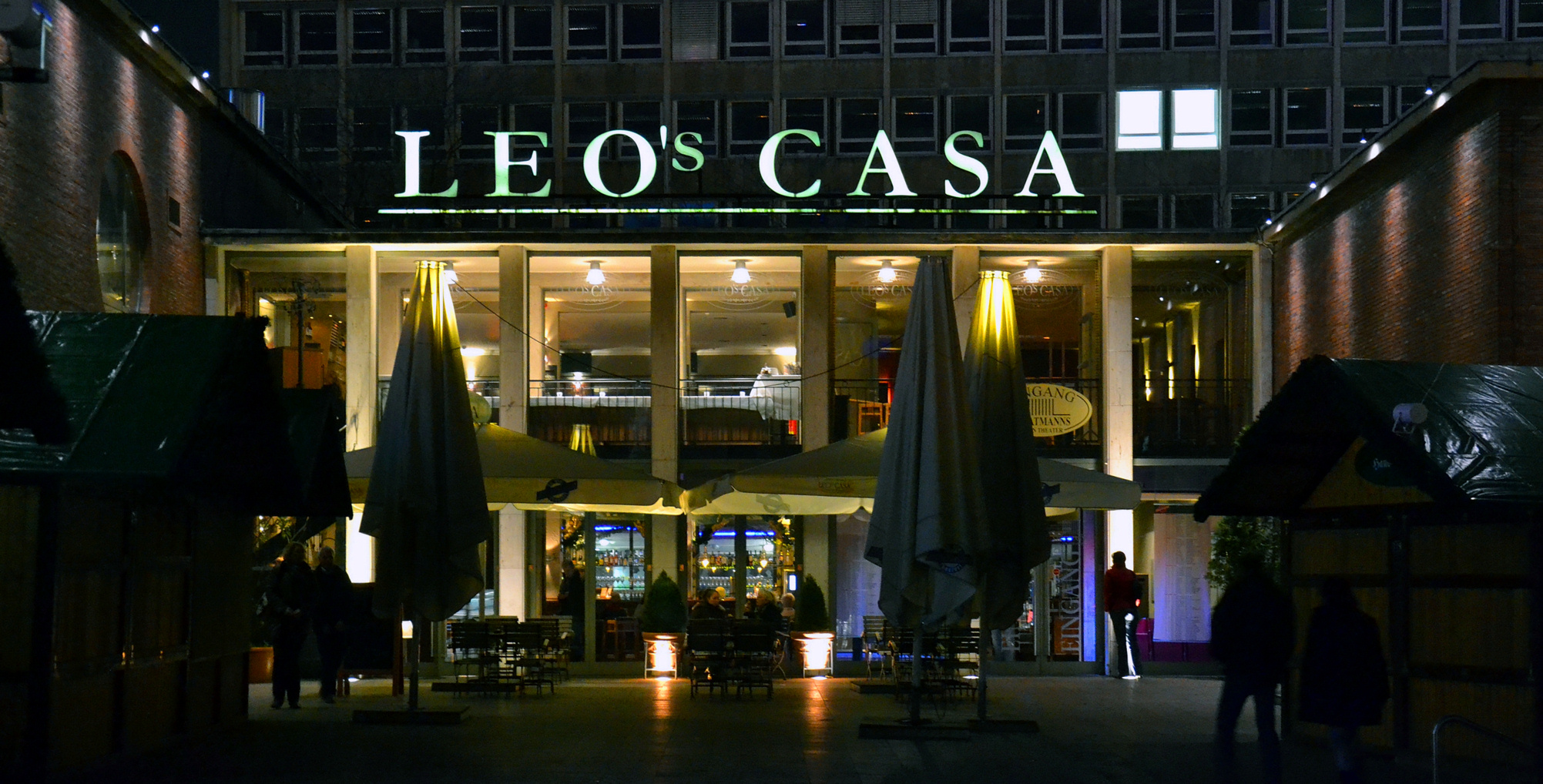
Entrance to Stratmanns Theater and the restaurant Leo's Casa

Stratmanns Theater Europahaus (English: Stratmann's Theatre in the House of Europe) is a Kabarett theatre in the former Amerikahaus Ruhr on the Kennedyplatz in Essen, North Rhine-Westphalia, Germany. It was founded in December 1994 by the brothers Ludger and Christian Stratmann.
