= Essen City Hall =

City hall in Essen, Germany

- Rathaus Essen
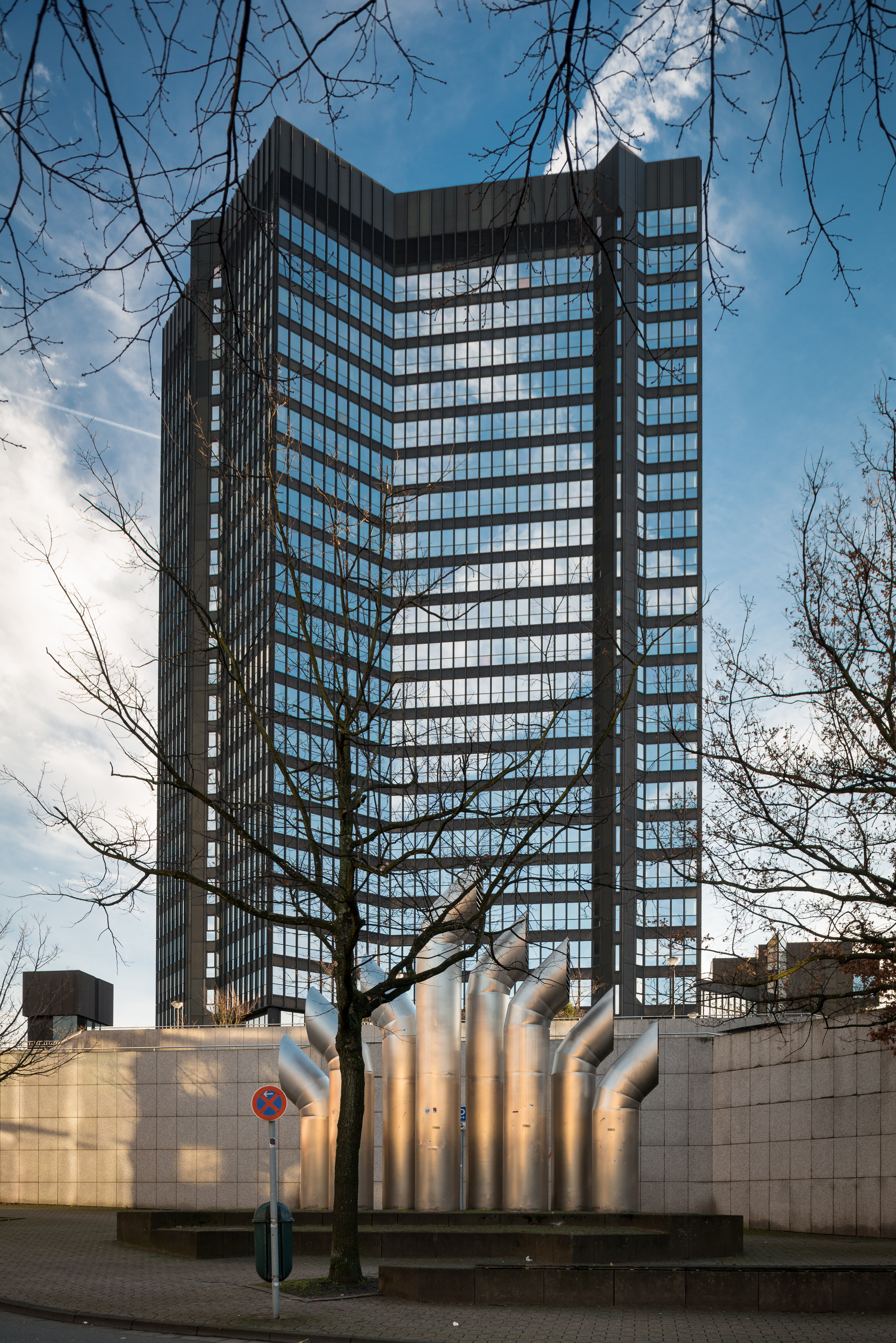
- The main frontage of the town hall in December 2012

General information
- Type: City hall
- Architectural style: International Style
- Location: Essen, Germany
- Coordinates: 51.4581°N 7.0159°E
- Completed: 1979
- Cost: DM189 million

Height
- Antenna spire: 115 m (377 ft)
- Roof: 106 m (348 ft)

Technical details
- Floor count: 23
- Floor area: 69,000 m^{2} (740,000 sq ft)

Design and construction
- Architect: Theodor Josef Seifert

The Essen City Hall (German: Rathaus Essen) is a municipal building in Essen, in western Germany, standing on Porscheplatz. It is the third tallest city hall in Germany after Leipzig City Hall and Hamburg City Hall.

== History ==
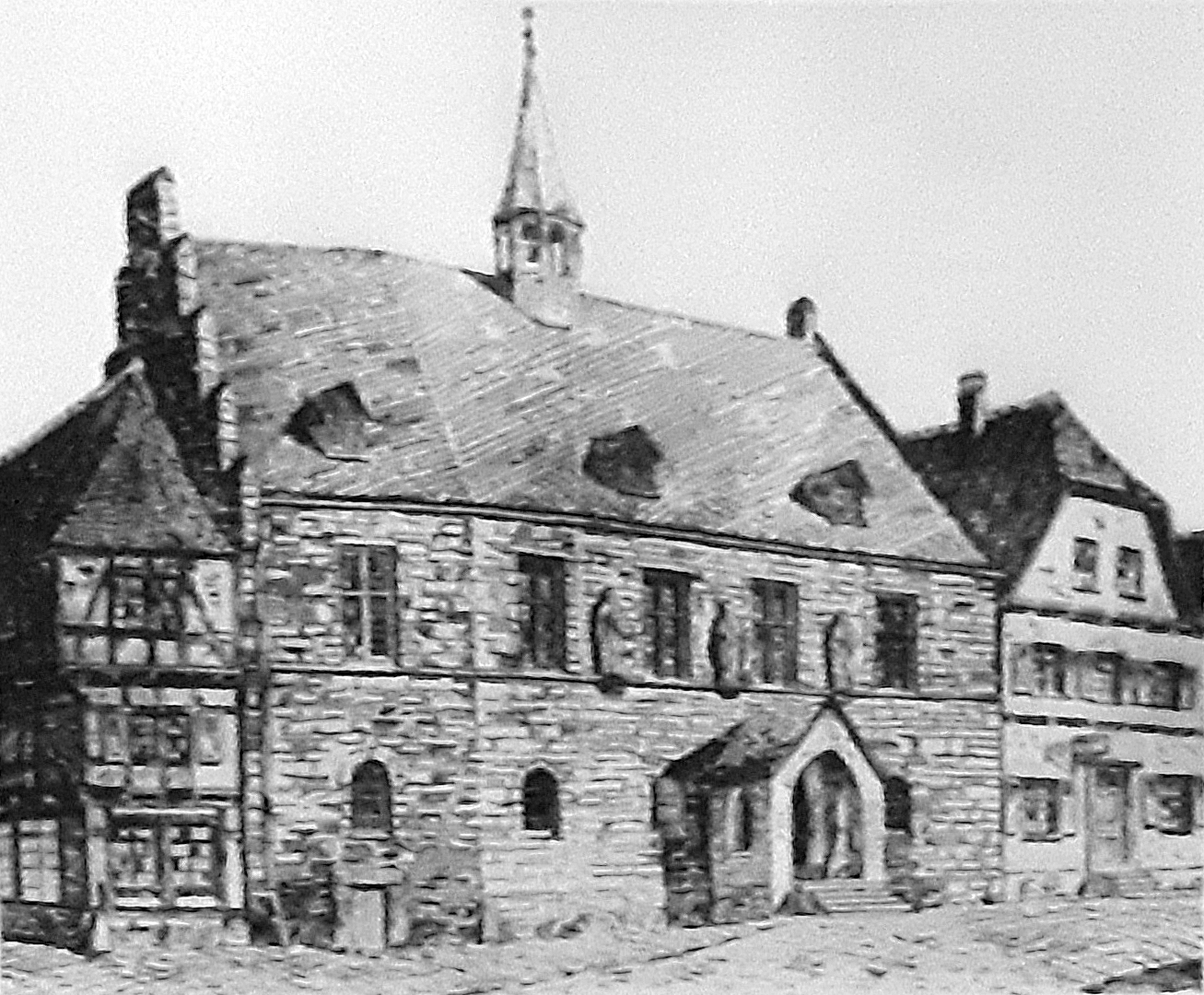
The medieval town hall

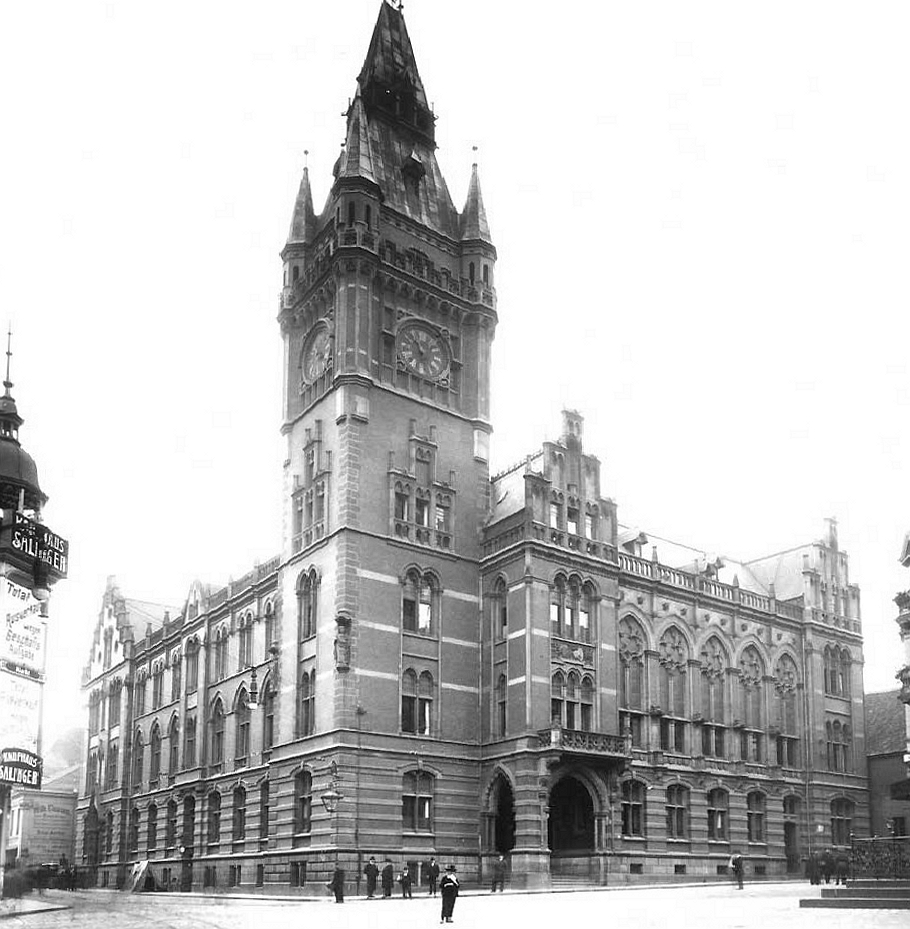
The third town hall in 1905

The first town hall was a medieval structure dating from the 13th century: it was a stone building with stepped gables on the ends and statues of the patron saints, Cosmas and Damian, on the front. It was replaced by a second town hall, on the same site, which was designed by Heinrich Theodor Freyse in the neoclassical style, built in ashlar stone and completed in 1842.

In the early 1880s, following significant population growth, the council decided to demolish the second town hall and to commission a more substantial structure on the same site. The foundation stone for the third town hall was laid on 5 June 1884. It was designed by Peter Zindel and Julius Flügge in the Gothic Revival style, built in ashlar stone and was completed in 1887. The building featured a four-stage tower on the corner of Kettwiger Straße and Gildenplatz (now Kennedyplatz). The tower was fenestrated by a segmental-headed window in the first stage, by a pair of mullioned windows, vertically stacked, in the second stage, and by a tri-partite window in the third stage. The fourth stage incorporated a clock and was surmounted by a parapet with machicolation and a square spire. The side elevations were fenestrated by mullioned windows and featured stepped gables which were adorned by new statues of Cosmas and Damian which were created by the sculptor, Heinrich Kröger.

After Kaiser Wilhelm II and the industrialist, Friedrich Alfred Krupp, visited the building in 1896, a painting by the artist, Friedrich Klein-Chevalier, depicting the visit was installed in the council chamber in 1898. The third town hall was badly damaged by the allied bombing of Germany during the Second World War and was subsequently partially rebuilt in a simplified form: the partial reconstruction was not a success and the site was sold to Wertheim Group so the building could be demolished and replaced by a department store in 1964.

The council commissioned the current town hall in the early 1970s. The site they selected was on Porscheplatz. Construction started on 1 July 1975. The 22-storey building was designed by Theodor Josef Seifert in the International Style, built in concrete and glass and was officially opened on 1 July 1979. The design involved a Y-shaped tower, which was 106 metres (348 ft) high, and faced with alternating rows of glass and dark cladding.

On 24 October 2018, the council evacuated the building because of a power failure arising from a technical defect. Operations were resumed the following day after the fault had been rectified.
