= Zeche Carl =

Coordinates: 51°29′43″N 7°00′43″E

Ruhr Industrial Heritage Trail

Zeche Carl (Carl Mine) is a cultural centre set up by Essen Council in a former coal mine.

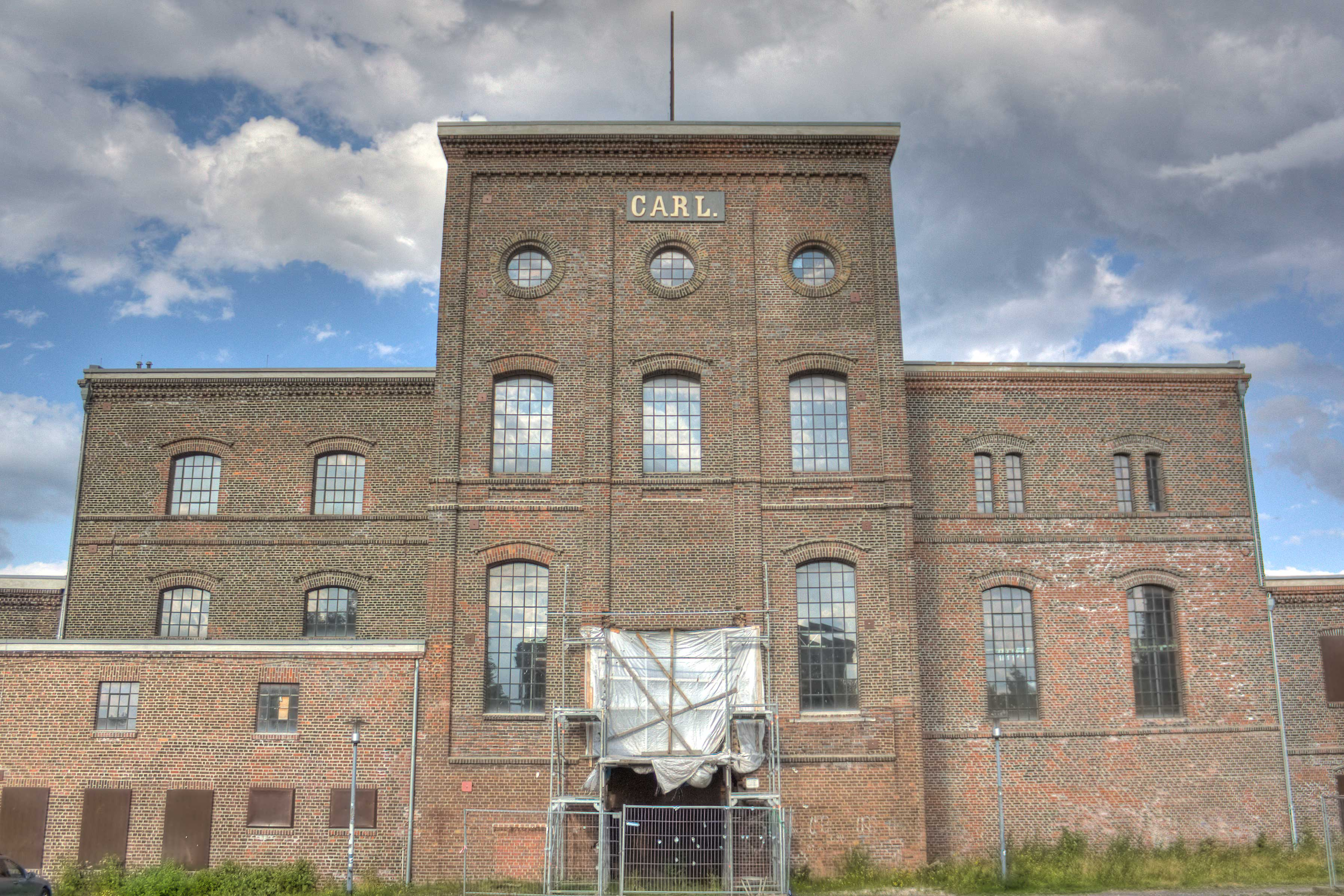
The engine tower of the Carl Mine, Essen

== History ==
The mine was founded by the Hercules Company in Altenessen in 1855. It should not be confused with the Hercules mine in central Essen. They sank a shaft equipped with a large-sized Malakow tower with two wings. The mine went operational in 1861. That same year Hercules was acquired by the Cologne Mining Association under Friedrich Grillo and was renamed the Zeche Carl.

The mine was soon to develop as it produced high quality Anthracite suitable for producing coke. From 1883, it simply produced Carl Coke. An additional ventilation shaft was drilled between 1885 and 1887.

In 1899 the Malakow tower was upgraded for double conveyance. The production was increased to 300,000 tonnes a year.

After the First World War, the Cologne Mining Association was taken over by Hoesch AG. Coal production was discontinued in 1929. The main shaft was dismantled and the ventilation shaft used for Zeche Emil Emscher. The ventilation shaft was in turn abandoned in 1955, and in 1970 all other colliery work at the site was brought to a close.

It is one of the sites included in the Ruhr Industrial Heritage Trail

== Recent Use ==
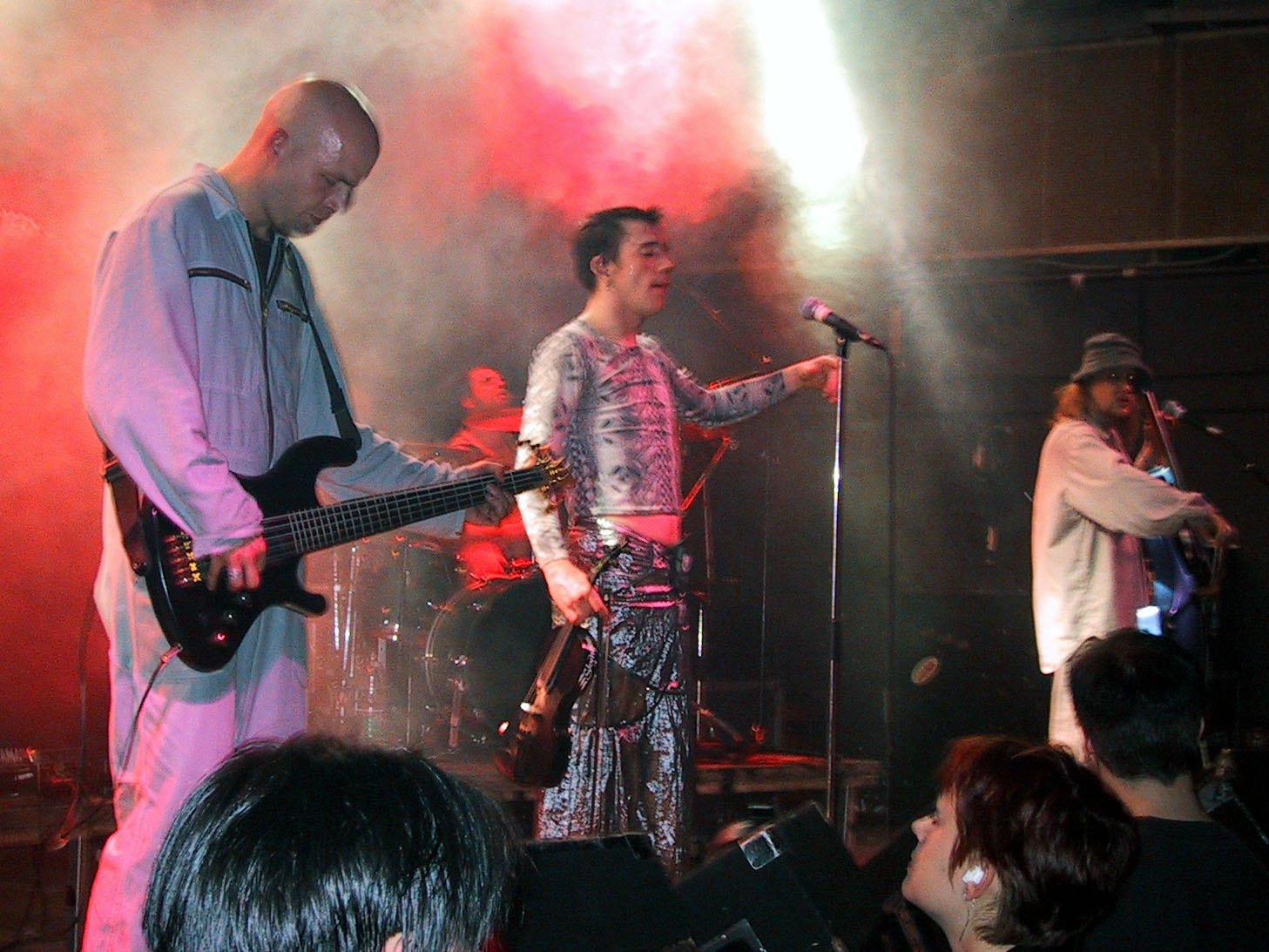
The Inchtabokatables in concert at Zeche Carl (2001)

In 1977, at the initiative of various citizens, youth and the local Protestant church Initiative Center Zeche Carl eV was established to run the former colliery as a Cultural Centre. The entire group of buildings are now being conserved.

The reconstructed building has developed as a pan-regional cultural centre offering a diverse programme of concerts, parties, classes, readings, exhibitions workshops etc. It also provides space for other community groups, including Offene Kanal Essen, a public television station.

As a Rock venue, Zeche Carl has hosted numerous bands.

Following the bankruptcy of the original association, Carl Gmbh was set up as nonprofit organisation, and is headed by Marcus Kalbitzer, who followed Kornelia Vossebein in 2020.
