= XOX-Theater Kleve =

Theatre in Kleve, Germany

Coordinates: 51°47′39″N 6°08′49″E

XOX-Theater Kleve is a theatre in Kleve, North Rhine-Westphalia, Germany.
