= Fabrik Heeder =

Architectural structure

Coordinates: 51.322983°N 6.572236°E

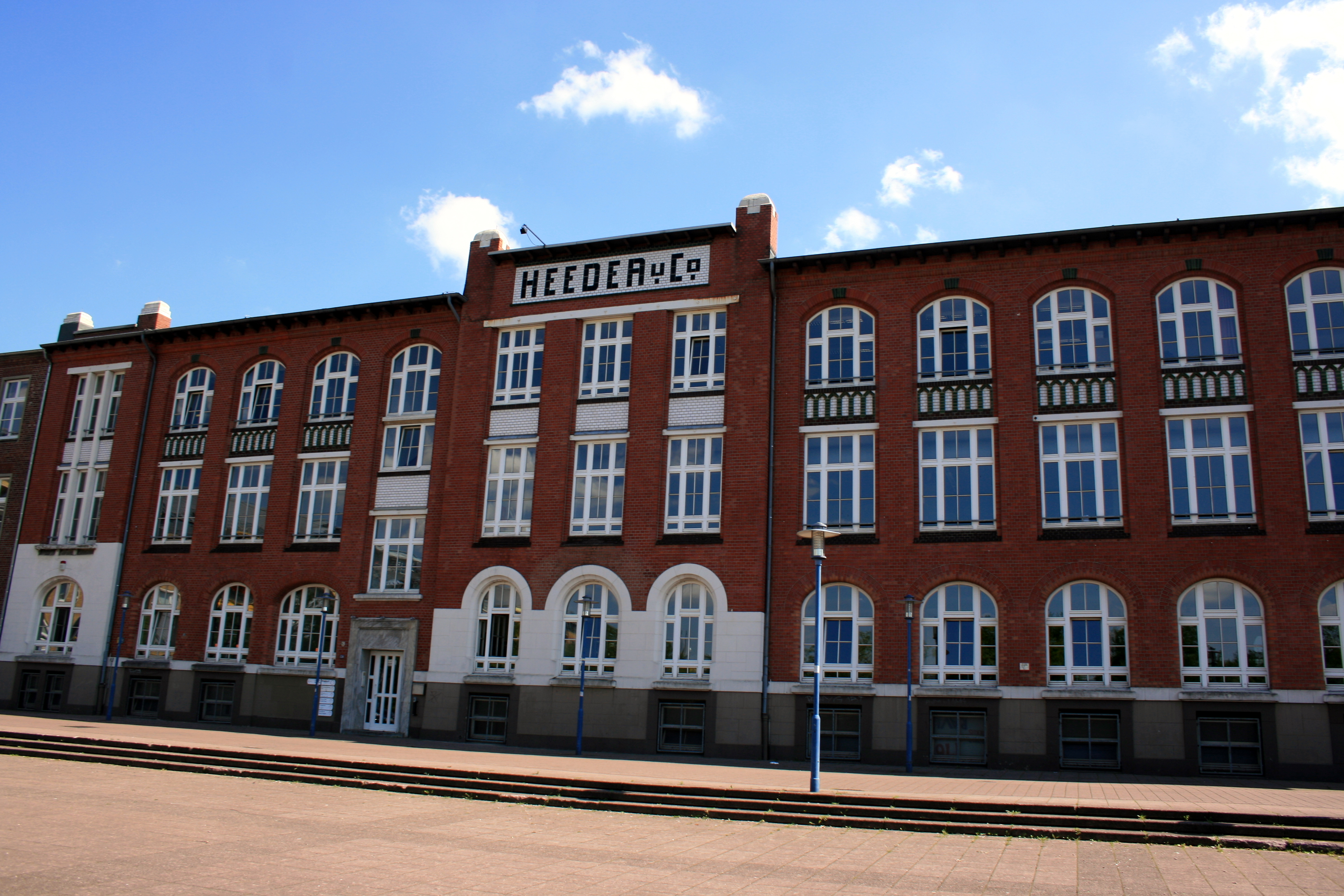
Krefeld, children's and youth theater center of the city in the Heeder factory, Virchowstrasse 130, monument no.365

Fabrik Heeder is a theatre in Krefeld, North Rhine-Westphalia, Germany. It is a former factory building, originally constructed in 1906, and has been in use for cultural activities since 1989.
