= Rottstraße 5 Theater =

Coordinates: 51°28′44″N 7°12′47″E

Rottstraße 5 Theater is a theatre in Bochum, North Rhine-Westphalia, Germany.
