= Öcher Schängche =

Theatre in Aachen, Germany

Coordinates: 50°46′22″N 6°04′46″E

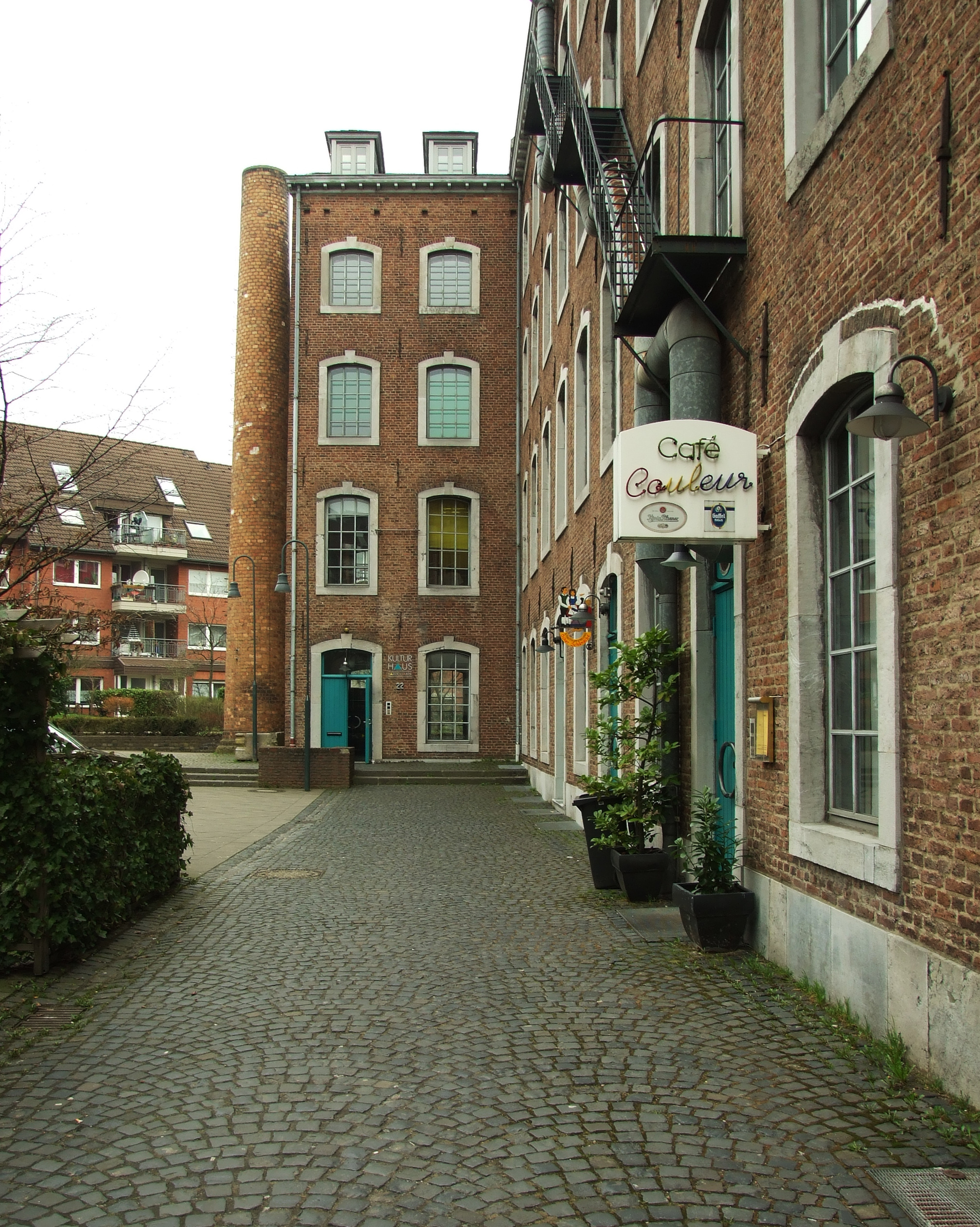
Öcher Schängche, March 2009

Öcher Schängche is a puppetry theatre in Aachen, North Rhine-Westphalia, Germany. It was founded by Will Hermanns and others in 1921.
