= Düsseldorfer Marionetten-Theater =

Coordinates: 51.22241°N 6.77263°E

Düsseldorfer Marionetten-Theater is a marionette theatre in Düsseldorf, North Rhine-Westphalia, Germany.
