= Stadttheater Herford =

German theatre in North Rhine-Westphalia

Coordinates: 52°07′14″N 8°40′43″E

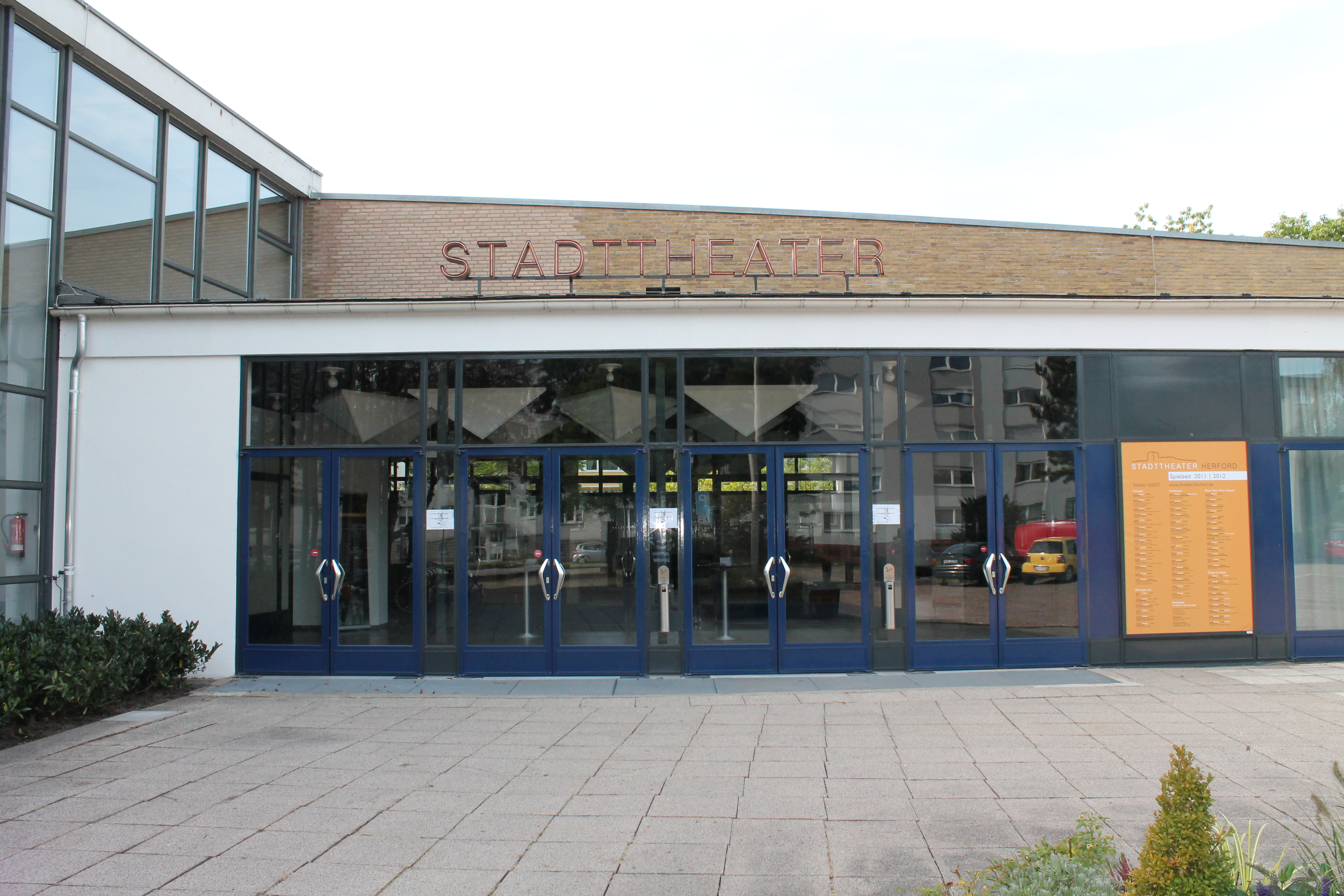
An image of Stadttheater Herford

Stadttheater Herford is a theatre in Herford, North Rhine-Westphalia, Germany. It is a venue without an ensemble of its own.
