= Freilichtbühne Herdringen =

Coordinates: 51°24′52″N 7°58′03″E

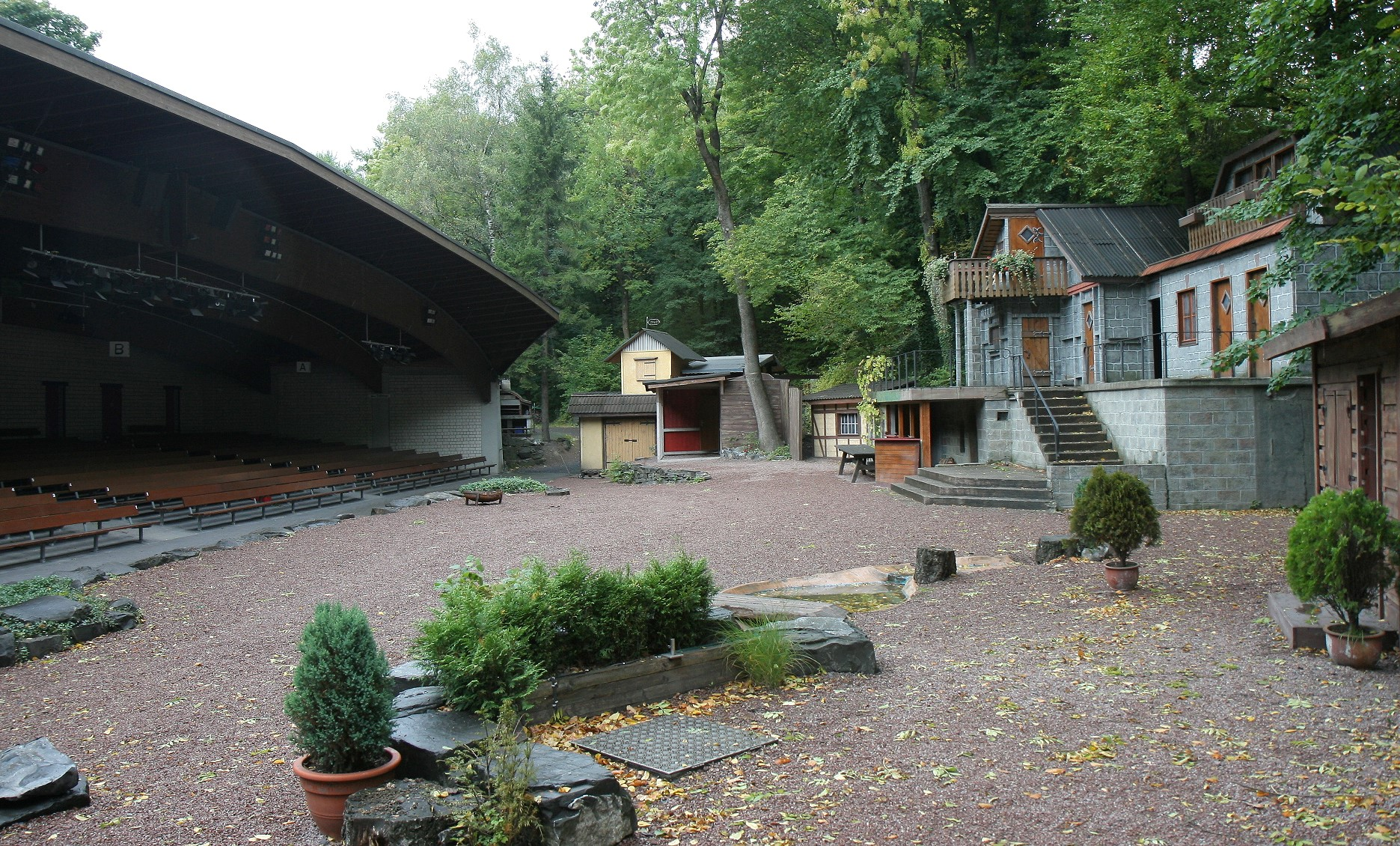
Freilichtbühne Herdringen.

Freilichtbühne Herdringen is a theatre in Herdringen, North Rhine-Westphalia, Germany. It was built in 1946, and first used in 1954.
