= Violettas Puppenbühne =

Theatre in Wegberg, North Rhine-Westphalia, Germany

Coordinates: 51°09′30″N 7°05′27″E

Violettas Puppenbühne is a theatre in Wegberg, North Rhine-Westphalia, Germany.
