= Mondpalast =

Theatre

Coordinates: 51°31′57″N 7°09′15″E

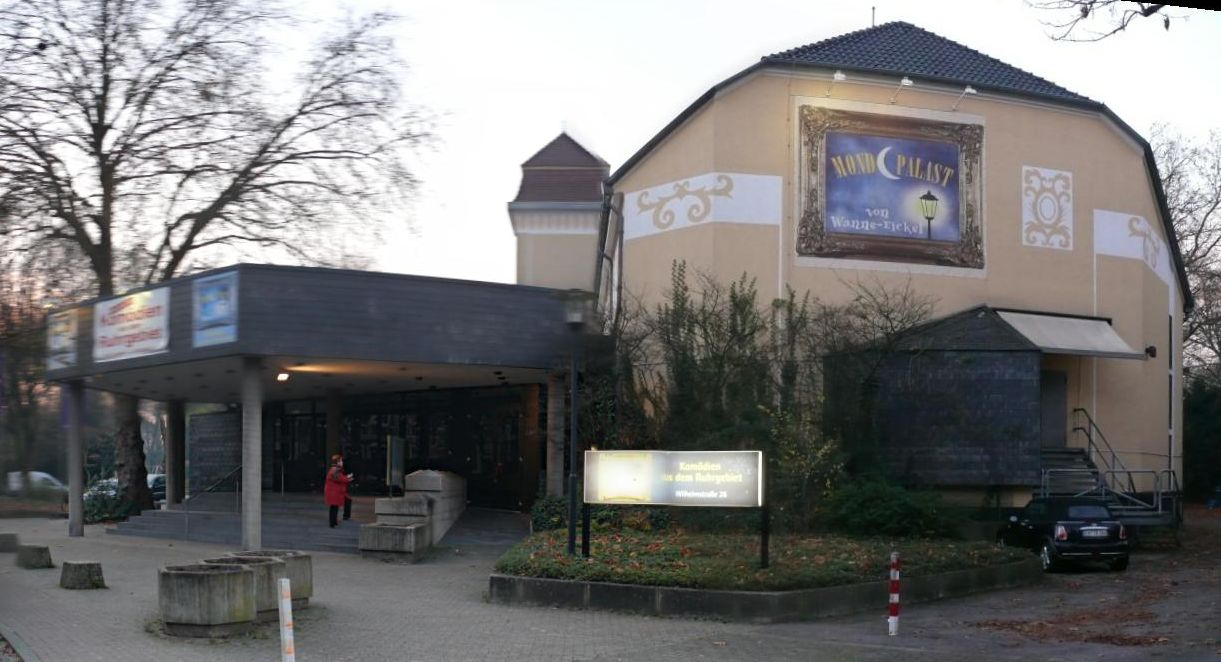
An image of Mondpalast

Mondpalast is a theatre in Herne, North Rhine-Westphalia, Germany.
