= Alte Brennerei Schwake =

Coordinates: 51°50′12″N 8°01′24″E

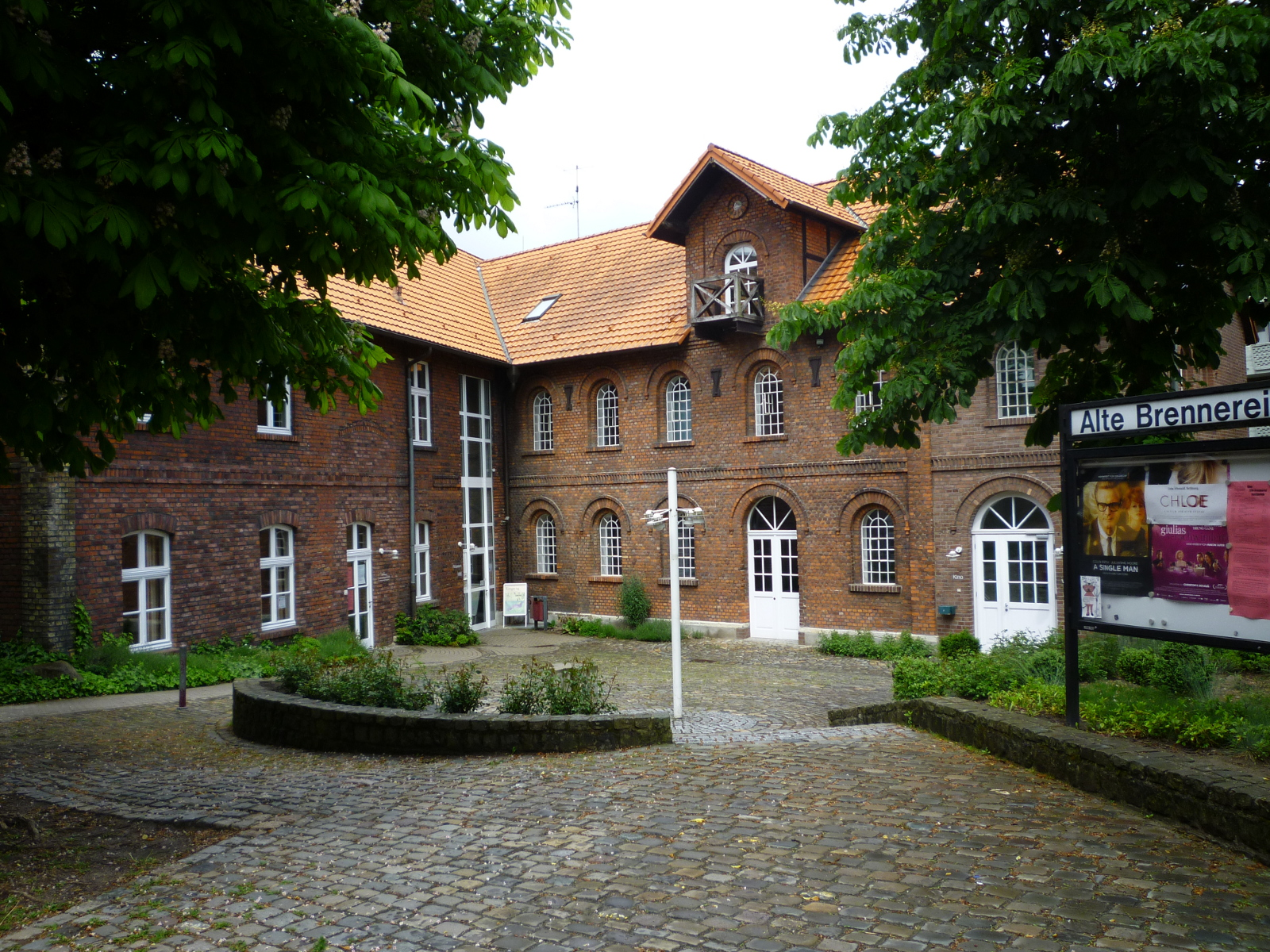
Picture of Alte Brennerei Schwake theatre

Alte Brennerei Schwake is a theatre in Ennigerloh, in the Münster region of North Rhine-Westphalia, Germany. It hosts the Ennigerloher Dichtungsring, a poetry competition.
