= Das Vollplaybacktheater =

Theatre in Wuppertal, North Rhine-Westphalia, Germany

Das Vollplaybacktheater is a theatre in Wuppertal, North Rhine-Westphalia, Germany.
