= Hansa Theater Hörde =

Coordinates: 51°29′13″N 7°30′07″E

Hansa Theater Hörde is a theatre in Dortmund, North Rhine-Westphalia, Germany.
