= Rex-Theater (Wuppertal) =

Coordinates: 51°15′30″N 7°08′59″E

Rex Theater
- Rex Filmbühne
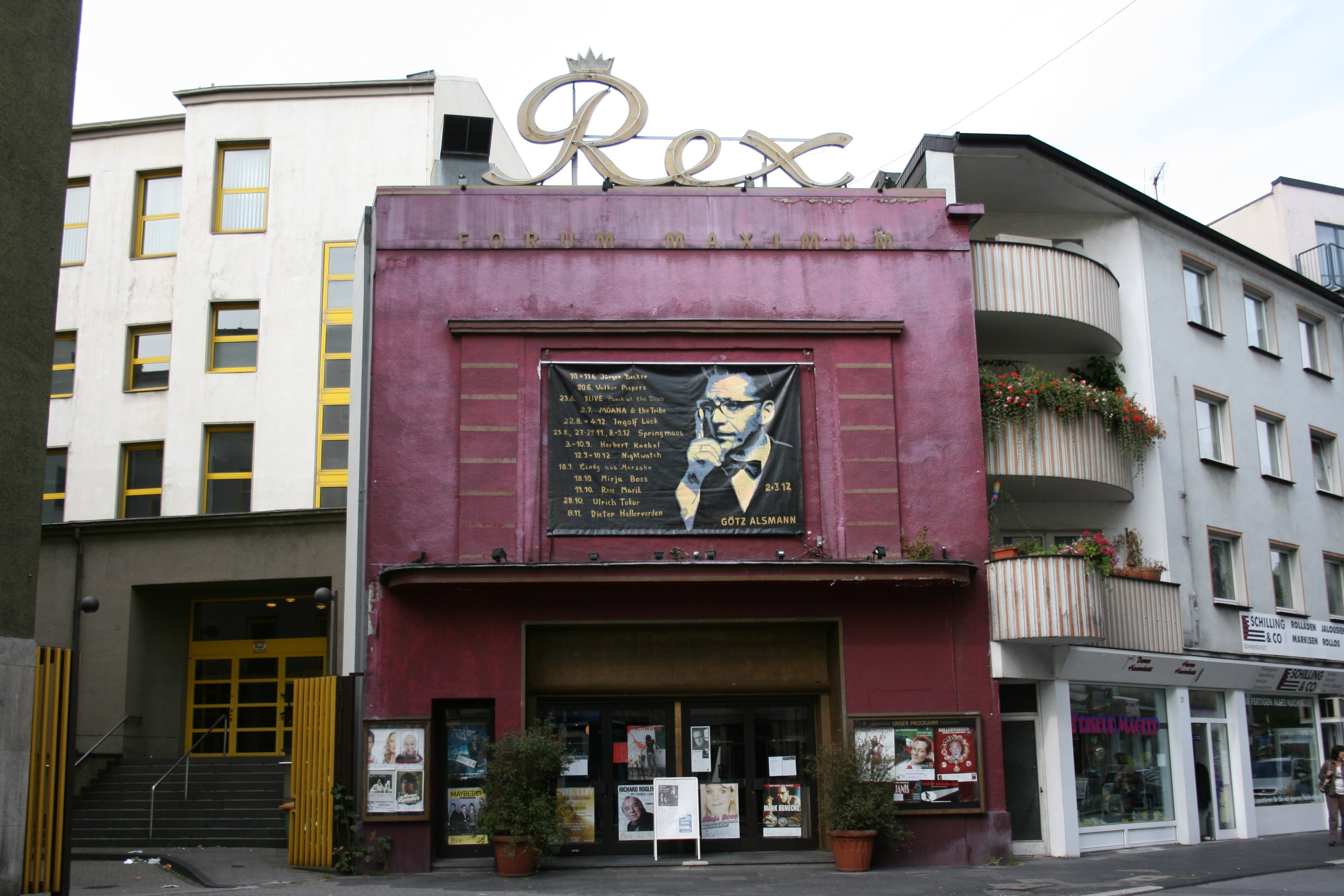
- Interactive map of Rex Theater
- Address: Kipdorf 29; Wuppertal; Germany
- Owner: Leo Häusler (1950)
- Capacity: 494

Construction
- Opened: 1887
- Rebuilt: 1937; 1950
- Architect: Hanns Rüttgers (1950)

Rex-Theater is a historically protected theatre in Wuppertal, North Rhine-Westphalia, Germany.

== History ==
In 1887, at the current location of the Rex Theatre, a restaurant and hotel with a large glass performance hall known as the "Salamander" was completed. The first film was shown in 1889, resulting in the Rex Theatre today claiming to be virtually the oldest cinema in the world. In the twenties and thirties as films became a popular source of entertainment led the Salamander to be rebuilt as a movie theatre by architect Hans Becker. The Salamander was renamed the "Apollo Theatre" and opened 24 September 1937. During World War II in 1943, Wuppertal was bombed several times. On the night of 24-25 June 1943, the Apollo Theatre was destroyed by fire.

=== Reconstruction ===
In 1950, the owner, Leo Häusler, hired Düsseldorf architect Hanns Rüttgers to rebuild the destroyed theatre. The theatre was completed in 1951 and opened 7 September renamed to "Salamander-Filmbühne," a homage to the original concert hall. However, in 1954 the theatre changed its name again after a legal dispute with the shoe manufacturer Salamander to "Rex-Filmbühne" (Rex Film Stage).

== Rex Theatre today ==
By the 1980s, television had forced many smaller theatres in Germany to close. The Rex Theatre became the only postwar theatre still open in Wuppertal. In 1999, the Rex Theatre was listed by the German government as a historically protected building under the German monument protection act. The theatre continues to operate until today.
