= Contra-Kreis-Theater =

Theatre in North Rhine-Westphalia, Germany

Coordinates: 50°44′00″N 7°06′04″E

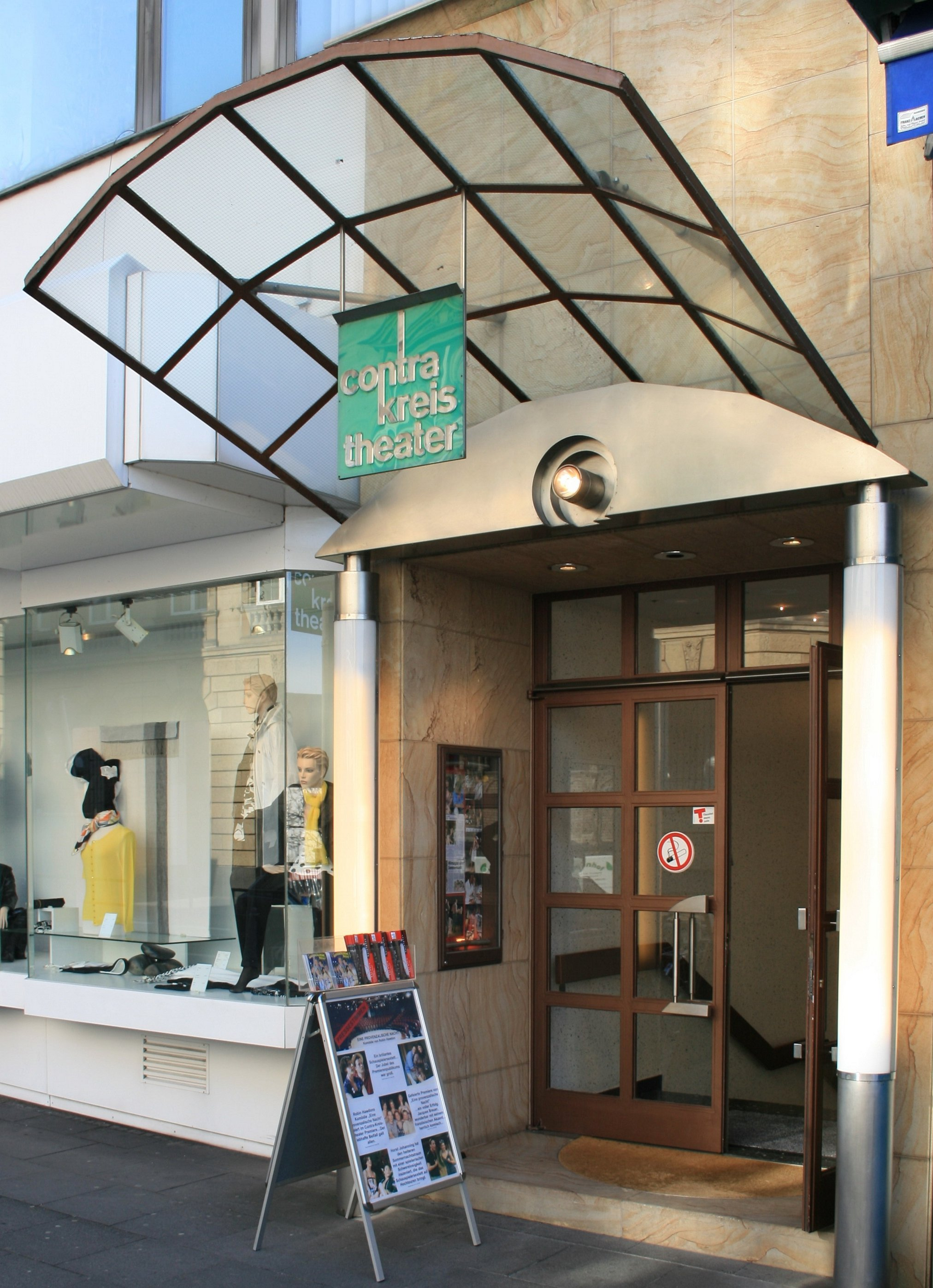
An image of Contra-Kreis-Theater

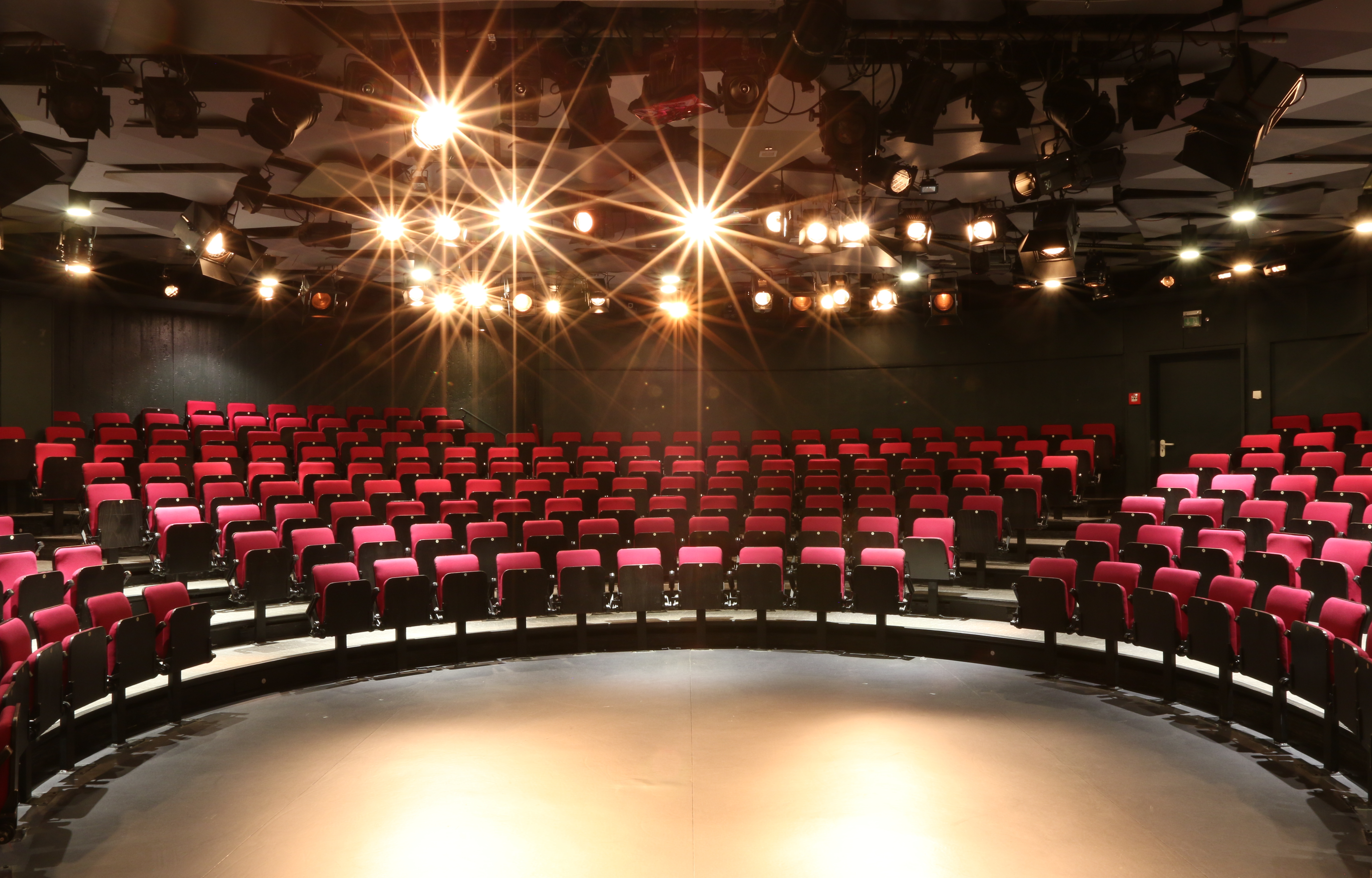
The auditorium

Contra-Kreis-Theater is a theater in Bonn, North Rhine-Westphalia, Germany. It is the oldest private theater in the city, first opening on 20 May 1950.
