= Müllers Marionetten-Theater =

Theatre in Wuppertal, North Rhine-Westphalia, Germany

Coordinates: 51.25988°N 7.153527°E

Müllers Marionetten-Theater is a theatre in Wuppertal, North Rhine-Westphalia, Germany.
