= Der kleine Häwelmann =

German fairy tale

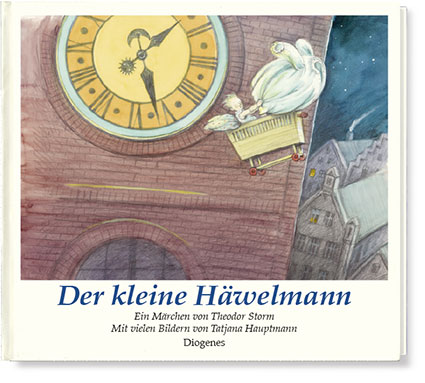
Edition from the Diogenes-Verlag

Der kleine Häwelmann (The little Havelman) is a German fairy tale written by Theodor Storm in 1849. In 1956, an eponymous film based on the fairy tale was released. Häwelmann is Low German and refers to a small child who demands excessive attention.

== Literature ==
- Theodor Storm (text); Yann Wehrling (illustration): Der kleine Häwelmann. Elatus Verlag, Kaltenkirchen 1996, ISBN 978-3-931985-06-6.
- Theodor Storm (text); Else Wenz-Viëtor (illustration): Der kleine Häwelmann. Lappan Verlag, Oldenburg 2004, ISBN 978-3-8303-1087-7.
- Monika Osberghaus: Schau mal! 50 beste Bilderbücher. dtv, München 2006, ISBN 978-3-423-62237-0.
