= D.a.S. Theater =

Coordinates: 50°53′10″N 7°03′36″E

D.a.S. Theater is a theatre in Cologne, North Rhine-Westphalia, Germany.
