= Comödie =

Theater in North Rhine-Westphalia, Germany

Comödie was a comedy theater in Wuppertal, North Rhine-Westphalia, Germany.

The comedy from 1994 to 2008, a boulevard theater under the direction of actor Jochen Schroeder, with three locations in the cities of Bochum, Duisburg and Wuppertal-Elberfeld. In addition to his acting use Schroeder served as CEO and director of operations.

The ensemble included, among other things, the actor Klaus Dahlen, Insa Magdalena Steinhaus, Rolf Berg, Doris Otto, Christina gag, Tanja Szewczenko, Christa Rockstroh, Claus Thull Emden, Sybille Waury and Britta Kohlhaas.

locations Wuppertal Left the office building with the comedy Wuppertal in 2007, even with the writing of the comedy behind the tree

The "comedy at Karlsplatz" from 2003 had a hall for 190 spectators in the premises of a former supermarket at Karlsplatz, who had relocated to the city arcades.

Between the comedy and the municipal theater operation, the Wuppertal Opera, there was sometimes a close cooperation. How could the 2004 comedy guesting at the Schauspielhaus and borrow costumes from there.

In June 2008, the works in Wuppertal, was closed because of financial difficulties first. Duisburg

The comedy Duisburg in the former European cinema was closed simultaneously with the comedy Bochum. Bochum

Schroeder staged here since 1994 in the former school auditorium on Ostring. After 14 years, he had to go to the other two sites, the Bochum house also close due to insolvency.
