= Die Säule =

Coordinates: 51°25′50″N 6°45′38″E

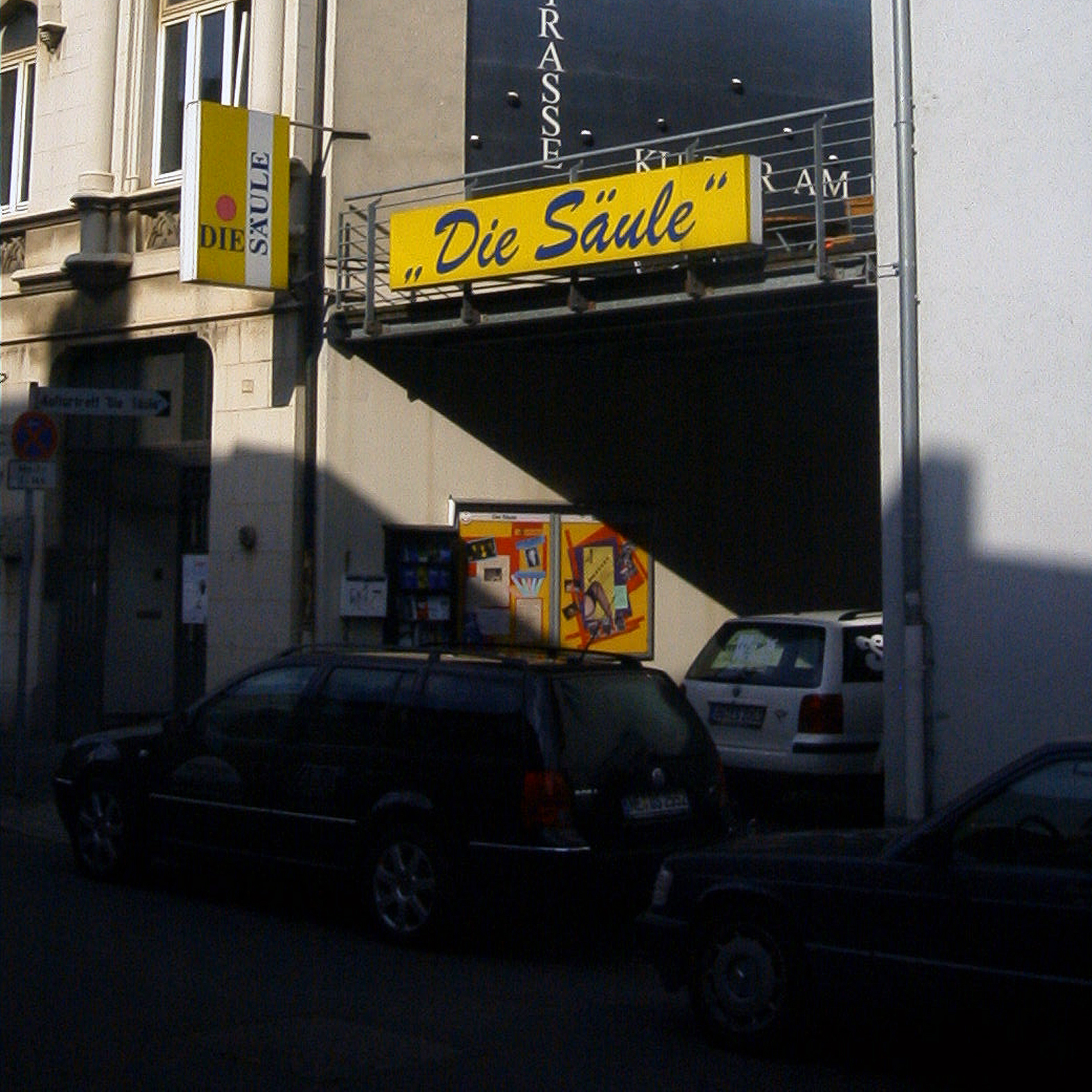
An image of Die Säule

Die Säule is a theatre in Duisburg, North Rhine-Westphalia, Germany.
