= Krieewelsche Pappköpp =

Theatre in Krefeld, North Rhine-Westphalia, Germany

Coordinates: 51°19′51″N 6°32′38″E

Krieewelsche pappköpp is a theatre in Krefeld, North Rhine-Westphalia, Germany.
