= Kumede =

Theatre in Cologne, North Rhine-Westphalia, Germany

Coordinates: 50°55′48″N 6°57′10″E

Kumede is a theatre in Cologne, North Rhine-Westphalia, Germany.
