= Thalia-Theater (Wuppertal) =

Former theatre in Wuppertal, North Rhine-Westphalia, Germany

Coordinates: 51°15′18″N 7°08′44″E

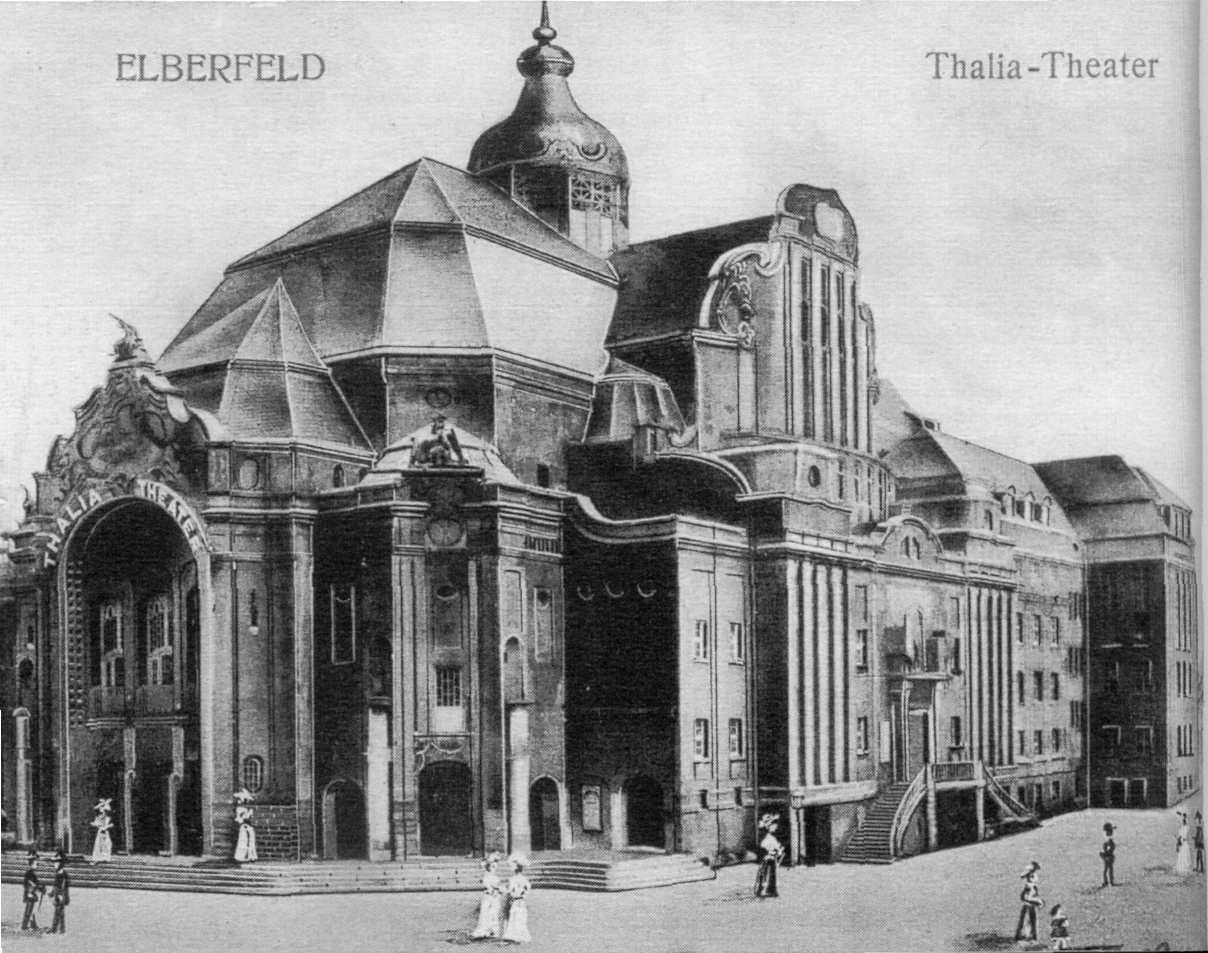
Wuppertal Thalia-Theater 1

Thalia-Theater was a theatre in Wuppertal, North Rhine-Westphalia, Germany.

== See also ==
- Thalia (Muse)
