= Offener Kanal Essen =

German television station

Offener Kanal Essen (Open Channel Essen) is a public television station based in Zeche Carl, Essen, Germany. Alongside Offener Kanal Dortmund, Offener Kanal Essen was one of the two largest open channels in North Rhine-Westphalia (category A). On January 1, 2009, the Open Channel ceased operations. This includes the TV station as well as the offering of seminars or the rental of technology and editing suites. At the suggestion of the LfM NRW, the state media commission decided to no longer support open channels in their previous form.
