= Theater im Pumpenhaus =

Coordinates: 51°58′24″N 7°38′10″E

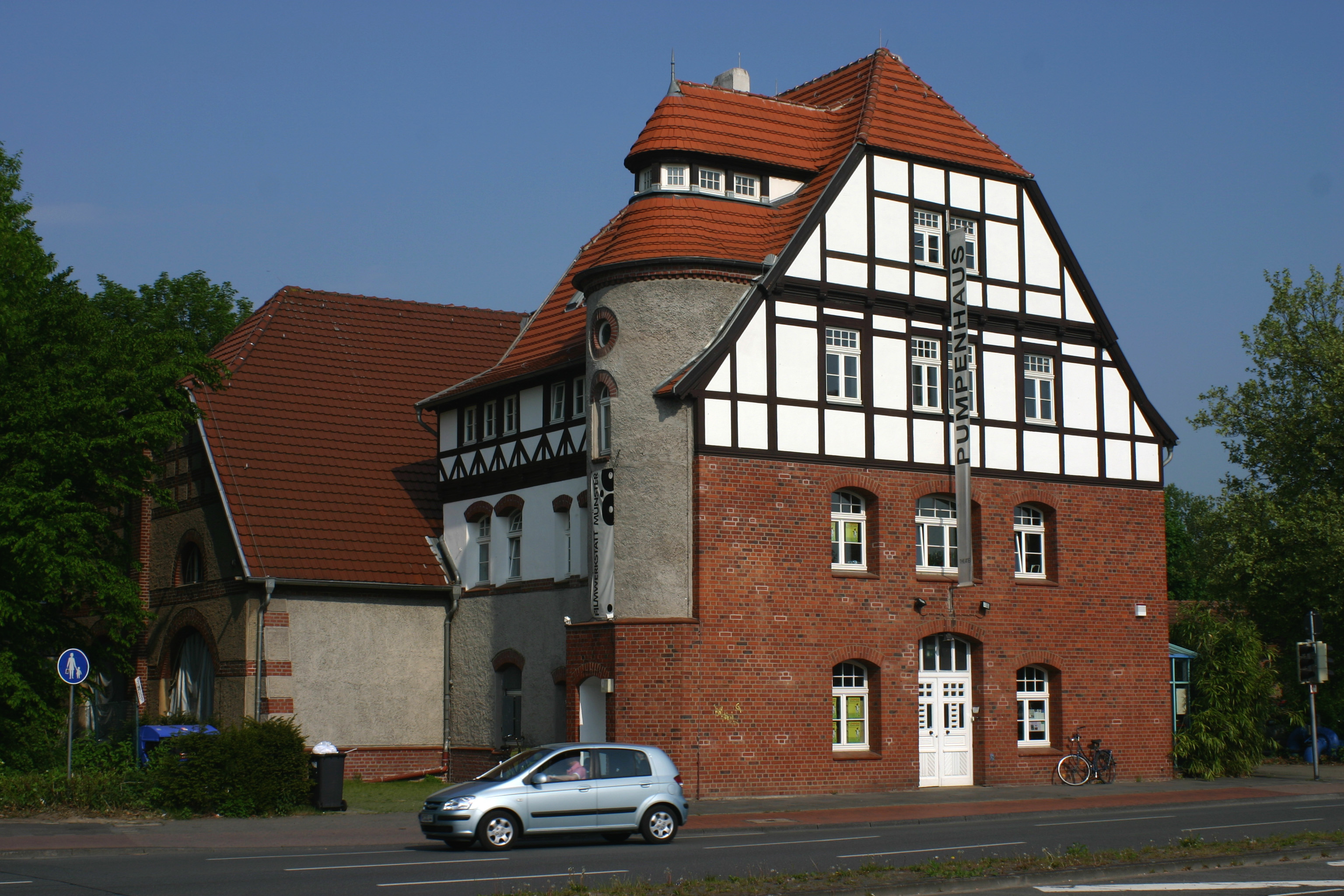
An image of Theater im Pumpenhaus

Theater im Pumpenhaus is a theatre in Munster, North Rhine-Westphalia, Germany. The theater was founded in 1985 and is one of the oldest independent theaters in Germany.
