= Werner-Jaeger-Forum =

Coordinates: 51°18′46″N 6°16′16″E

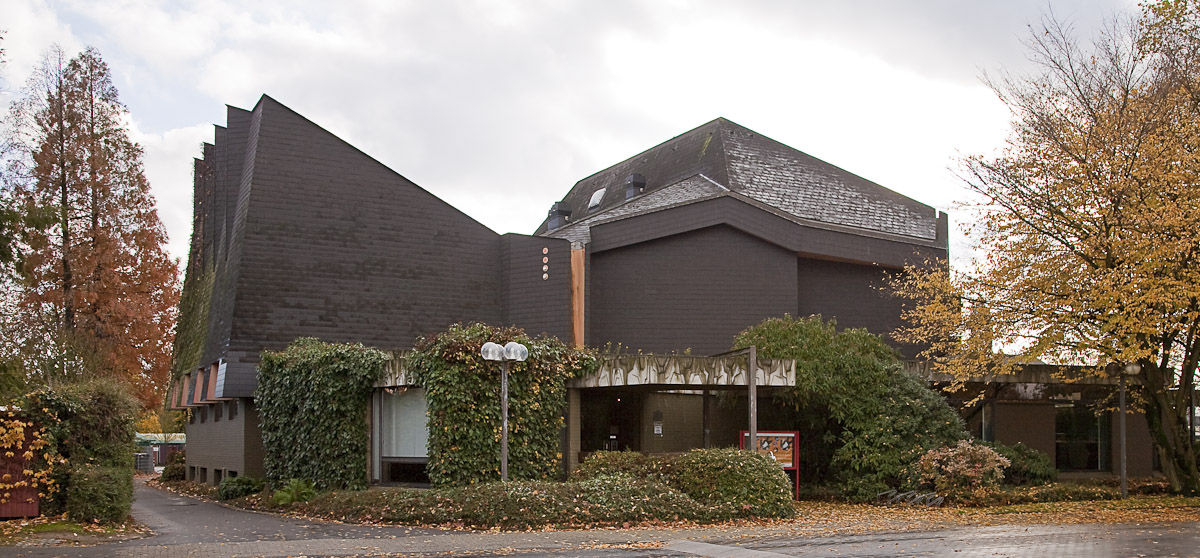
An image of Werner-Jaeger-Halle

Werner-Jaeger Forum, formerly known as Werner-Jaeger-Halle is a theatre in Nettetal, North Rhine-Westphalia, Germany.
