= Junges Theater Bonn =

Theatre in North Rhine-Westphalia, Germany

Coordinates: 50°44′11″N 7°07′01″E

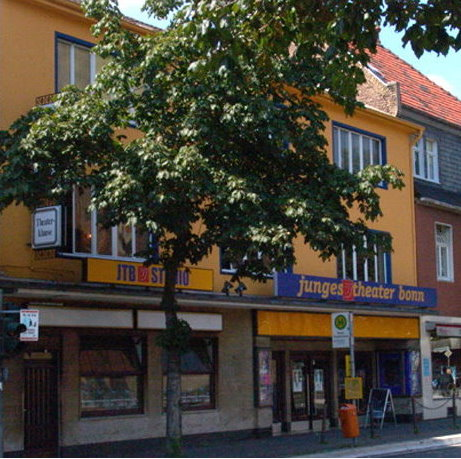
An image of Junges Theater Bonn

Junges Theater Bonn is a theatre in Bonn, North Rhine-Westphalia, Germany. It was founded in 1969.
