= Theater in Cronenberg =

Coordinates: 51°12′22″N 7°07′44″E

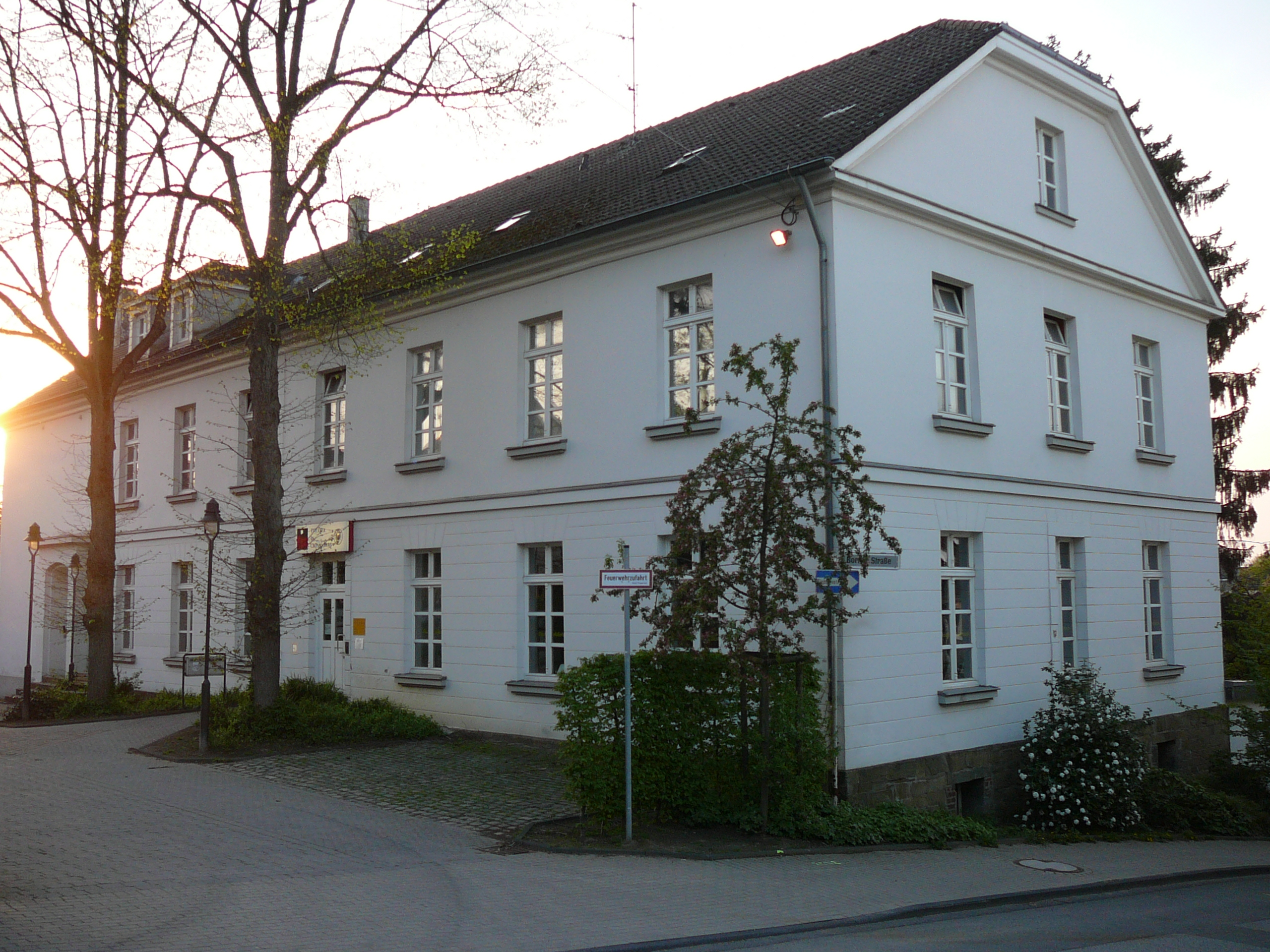
An image of Theater in Cronenberg

The Theater in Cronenberg is a theatre in Wuppertal, North Rhine-Westphalia, Germany.
