= Kulturhaus Lüdenscheid =

Coordinates: 51°12′52″N 7°37′56″E

Kulturhaus Lüdenscheid is a theatre in Ludenscheid, North Rhine-Westphalia, Germany.
