= Westfälische Kammerspiele =

Coordinates: 51°43′02″N 8°45′16″E

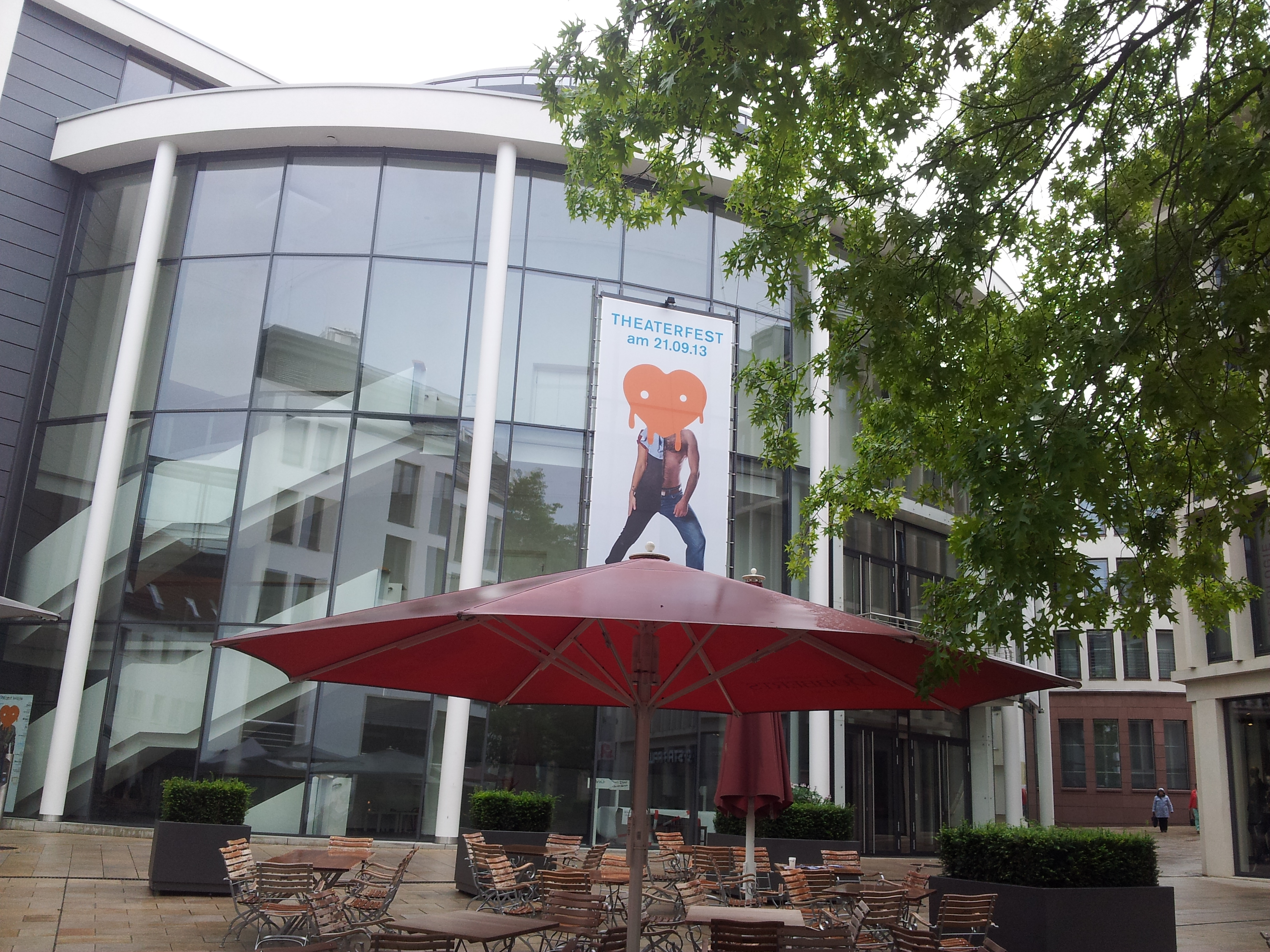
An image of Westfälische Kammerspiele

Westfälische Kammerspiele is a theatre in Paderborn, North Rhine-Westphalia, Germany.
