= Freilichtbühne Billerbeck =

Coordinates: 51°58′49″N 7°18′00″E

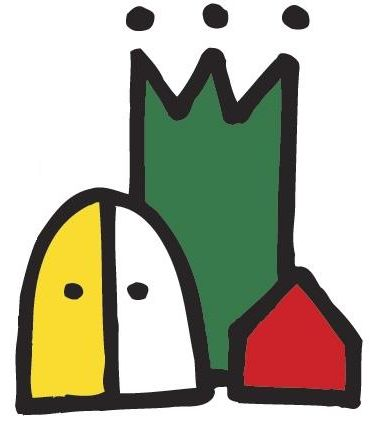
Logo

Freilichtbühne Billerbeck is a theatre in Billerbeck, North Rhine-Westphalia, Germany.
