= Tazzelwurm (Varieté) =

Coordinates: 50°55′47″N 6°56′17″E

The Tazzelwurm (Varieté) was a theatre in Cologne, North Rhine-Westphalia, Germany. It was the first music hall theatre (in American usage Vaudeville theater) in Cologne after World War II. The building was located on Zülpicher Street and was one of the few remaining larger halls in largely destroyed post-war Cologne.

The first carnival-style revue was performed here in November 1945. In the 1946-47, Carnival season local comedy and musical greats such as Grete Fluss, Jupp Schlösser, and Gerhard Jussenhoven appeared.
