= Puppenpavillon Bensberg =

Coordinates: 50°57′38″N 7°09′17″E

Puppenpavillon Bensberg is a puppet theatre in Bensberg, North Rhine-Westphalia, Germany, which puts on a wide variety of puppet shows. It was founded in 1989 by puppeteer Heide Hamann. Since 2009, Gerd J. Pohl has served as the theatre's director.
