= Kulturzentrum Bandfabrik =

German theatre

Coordinates: 51°16′37″N 7°15′33″E

Kulturzentrum Bandfabrik is a theatre in Wuppertal, North Rhine-Westphalia, Germany.
