= Theater Tiefrot =

Theater in Cologne, Germany

Coordinates: 50°56′54″N 6°57′36″E

Theater Tiefrot is a private theatre in Cologne, North Rhine-Westphalia, Germany. The artistic director is named Volker Lippman, an actor and director, as well as the Tiefrot's founder.

== Repertoire ==
The theatre has made a name for itself by showing some notable plays like The Artificial Silk Girl by Irmgard Keun and Brother Molière by Gerold Theobald. The Tiefrot claims on their website that they have won the Cologne Theater Prize seven times - however, there is no reliable source to reinforce this.

== Trivia ==
- The Tiefrot has up to 99 seats.
- The theatre is housed in the home of a former journeyman.
