= Cassiopeia Theater =

Theatre in North Rhine-Westphalia, Germany

Cassiopeia Theater is a theatre in Cologne, North Rhine-Westphalia, Germany.
