= Das Kleine Theater Essen =

Coordinates: 51°27′30″N 7°00′32″E

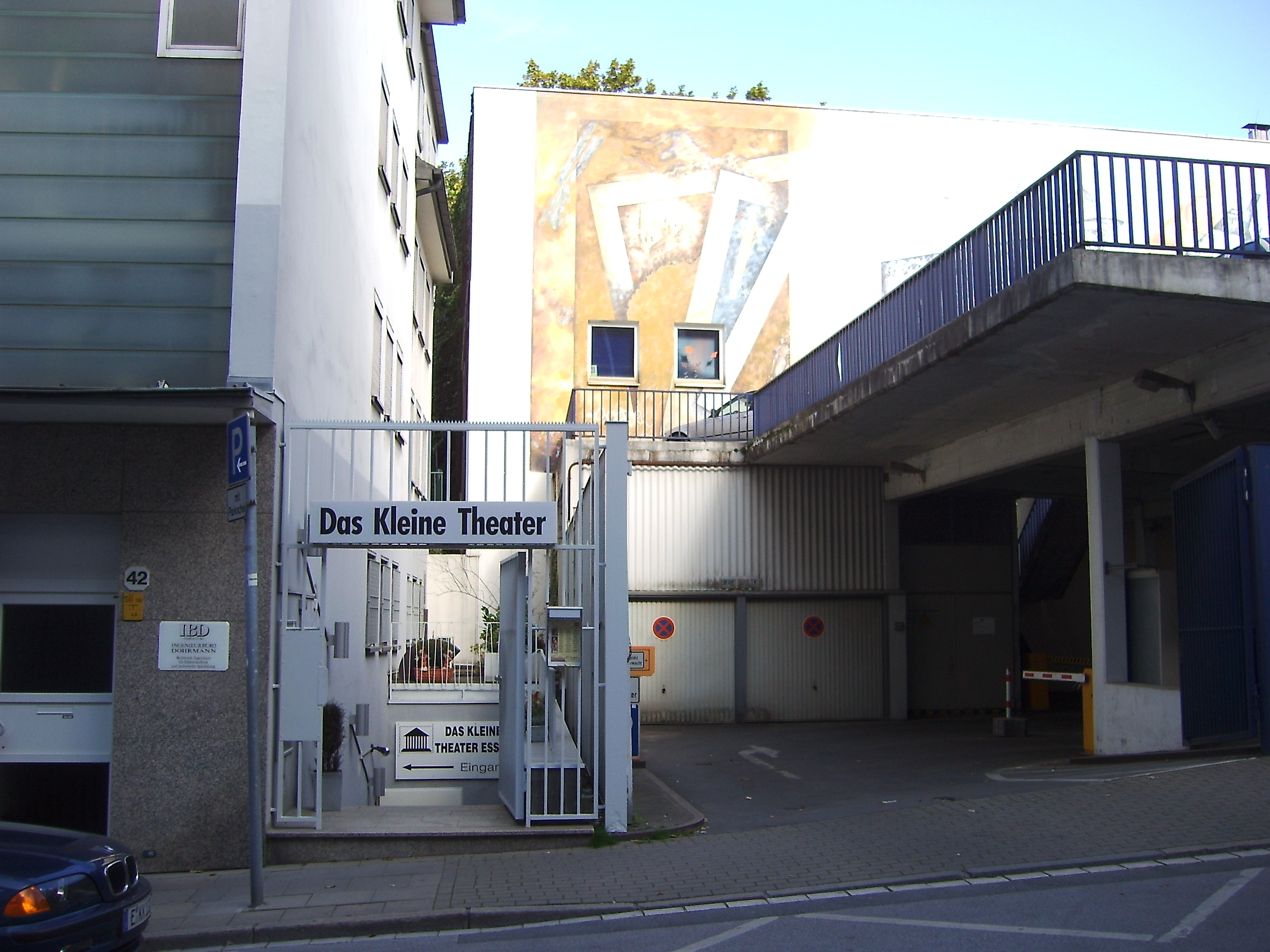
The theatre

Das Kleine Theater Essen is a theatre in Essen, North Rhine-Westphalia, Germany.
