= Prinz-Regent-Theater =

Theatre in Bochum, Germany

Coordinates: 51°27′02″N 7°13′01″E

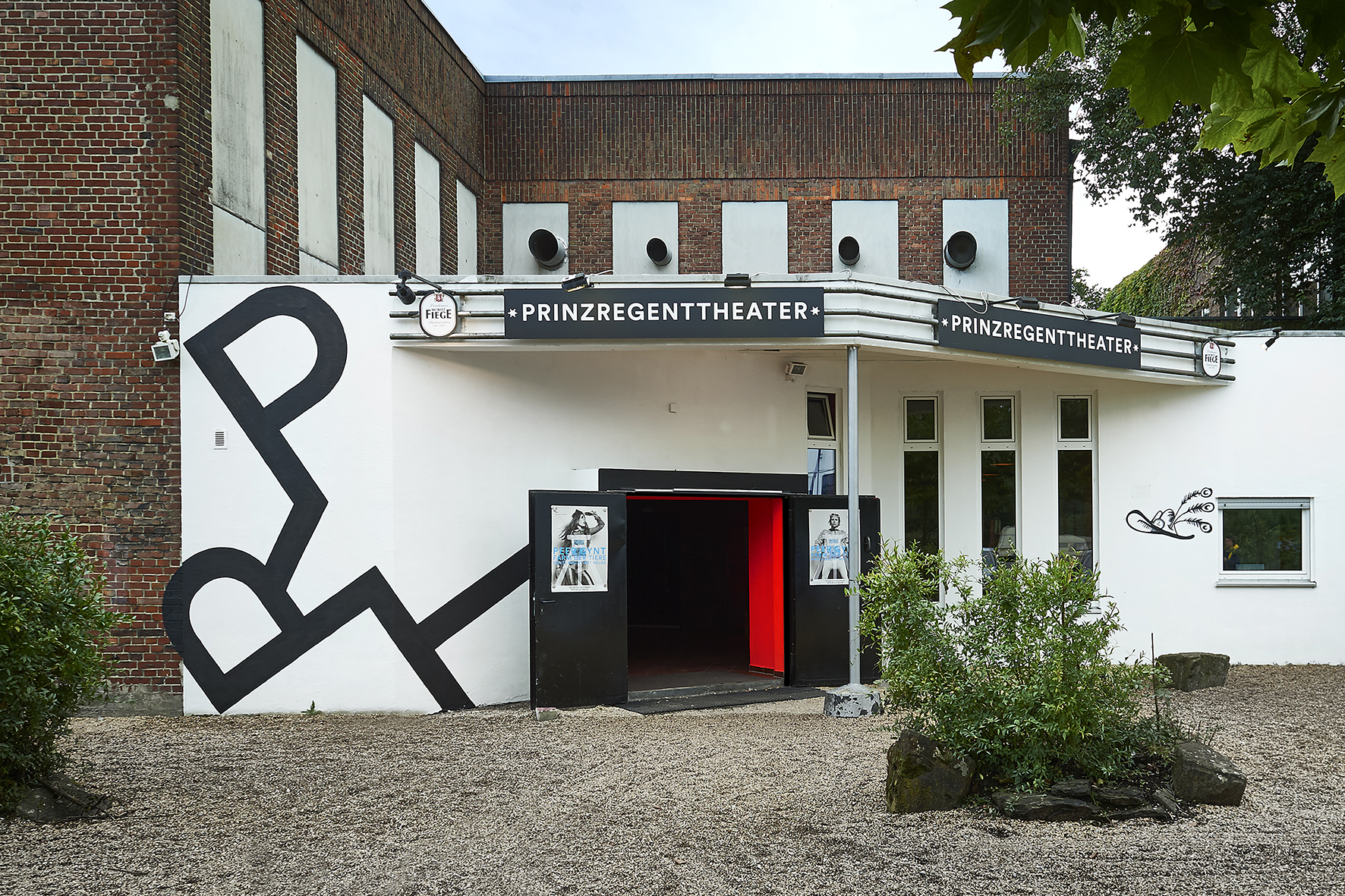
An image of Prinz-Regent-Theater

Prinz-Regent-Theater is a theatre in Bochum, North Rhine-Westphalia, Germany.
