= Opernwerkstatt am Rhein =

Non-Profit Opera theatre in Hurth, Germany

Opernwerkstatt am Rhein is a theatre in Hürth, North Rhine-Westphalia, Germany.

The productions combine opera, cabaret and improvisational theater. As a non-profit association, the opera workshop is dedicated to promoting young artists on the one hand and pursuing social projects to integrate socially disadvantaged groups on the other.
