= Kennedyplatz =

Coordinates: 51.4565°N 7.011028°E

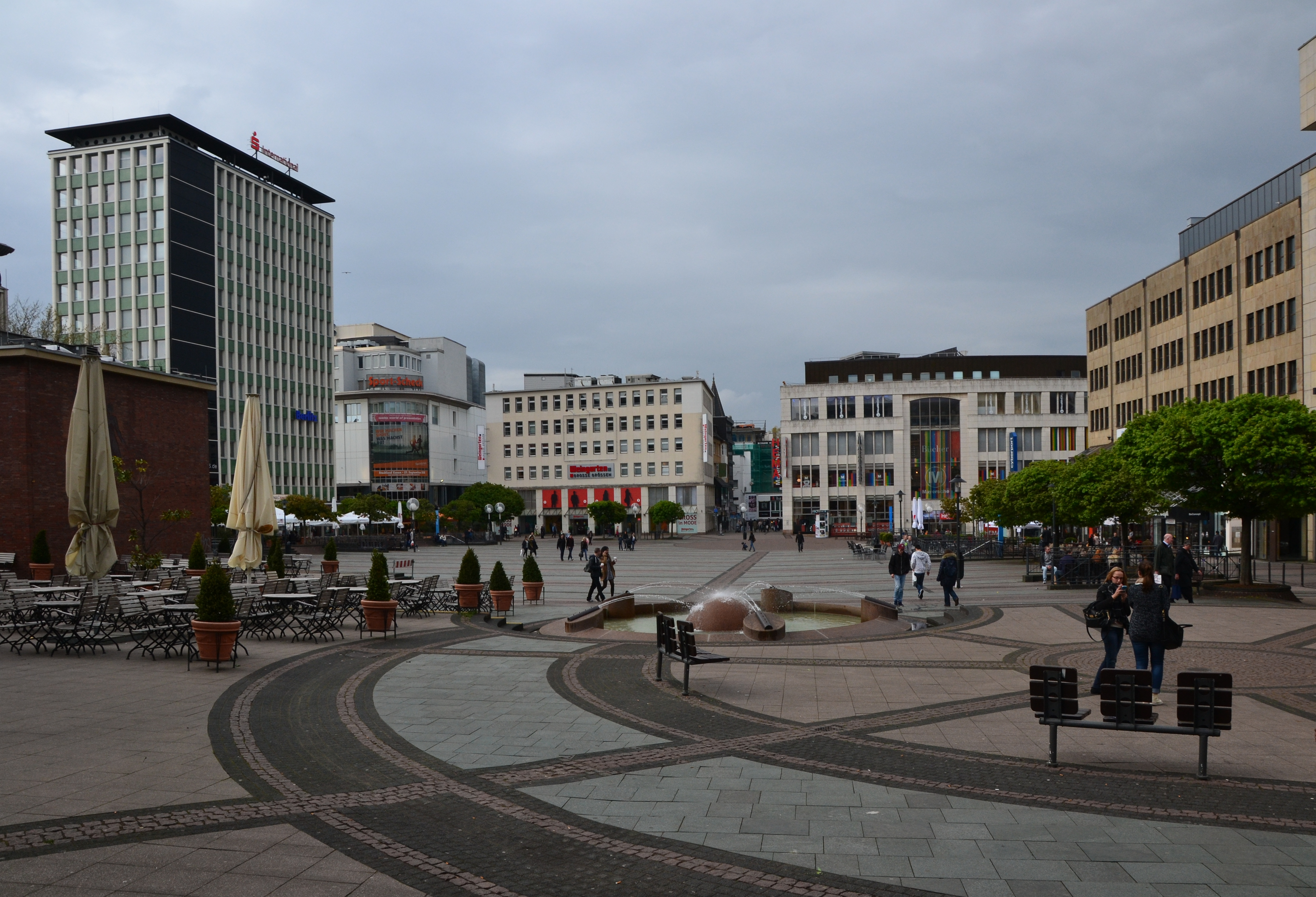
Kennedyplatz

Kennedyplatz is a plaza in the German city of Essen. It was laid out on a previously densely-built site which had been destroyed in the Second World War. Today, the area serves as an inner-city event space.

Previously known as the Gildenplatz, the square was renamed on 17 December 1963 in memory of US president John F. Kennedy, who was assassinated the previous month.
