= GOP Varieté Essen =

Theatre in Essen, North Rhine-Westphalia, Germany

Coordinates: 51°27′38″N 7°00′45″E

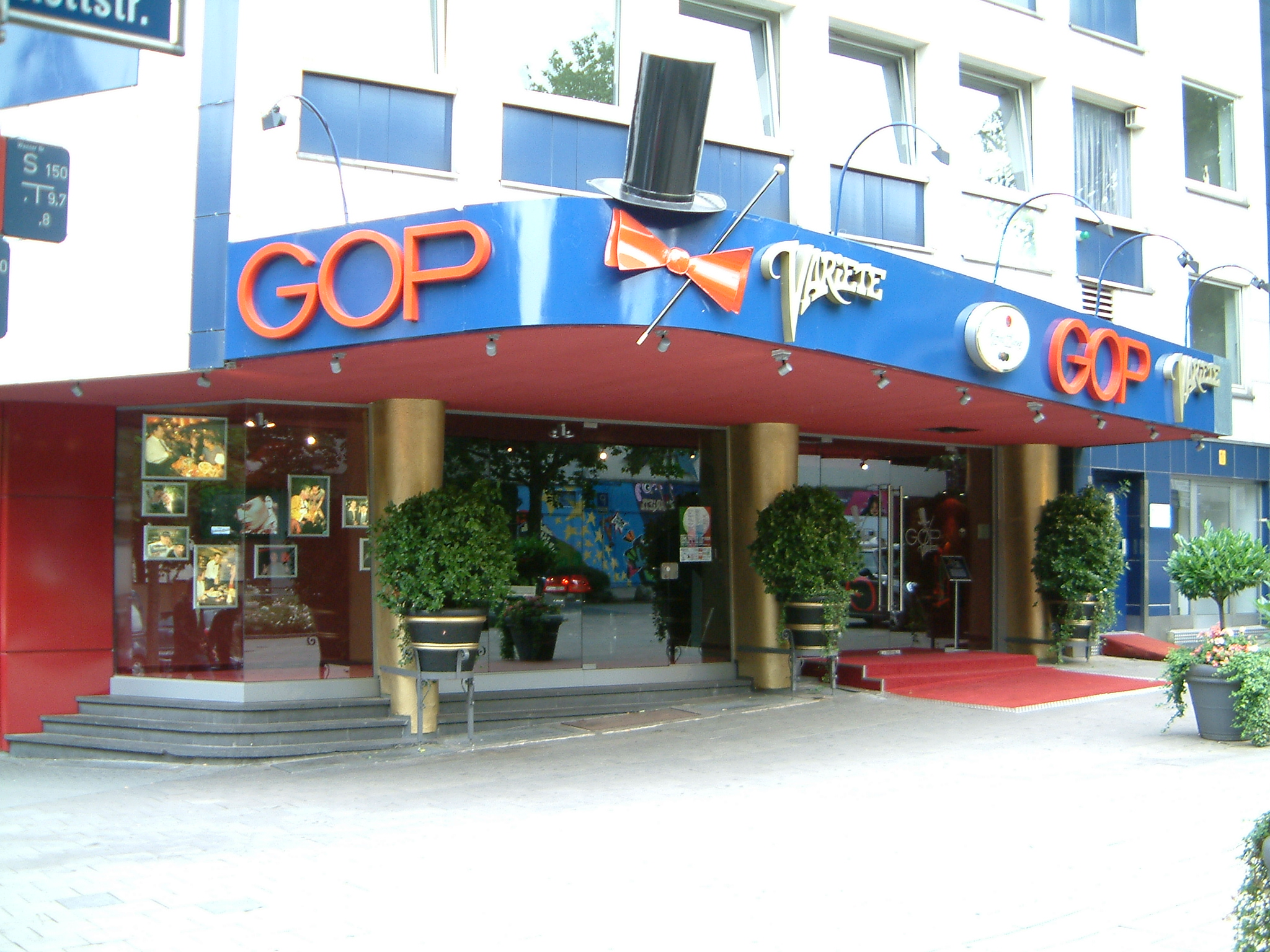
GOP Varieté in Essen, Germany

GOP Varieté Essen is a theatre in Essen, North Rhine-Westphalia, Germany.
