= Walter Bruno Iltz =

German actor, drama producer and theatre manager

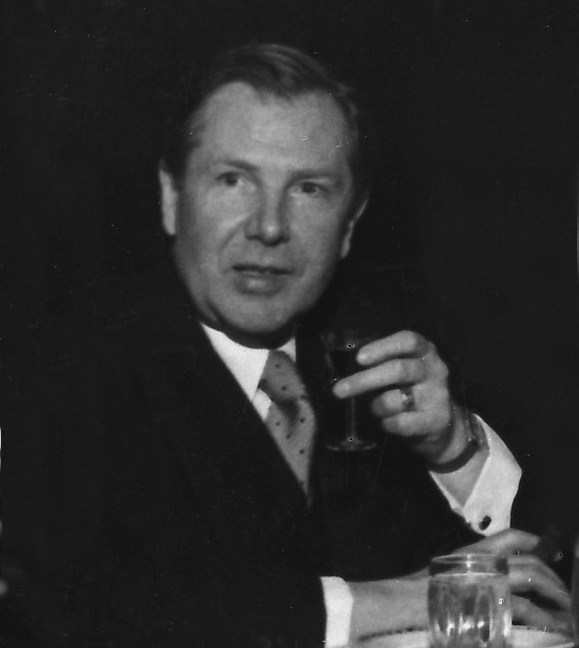
- 1938
- Born: 17 November 1886; Praust (Danzig), Prussia, Germany
- Died: 5 November 1965 (aged 78); Tegernsee, Upper Bavaria, West Germany
- Occupations: Stage actor drama producer theatre director
- Spouse(s): 1. Helena Forti (1884–1942); 2. Katharina "Käthe" Königs

Walter Bruno Iltz (17 November 1886 – 5 November 1965) was a German stage actor, drama producer and theatre manager.

== Life ==
=== Provenance and early years ===
Walter Bruno Iltz was born at Praust (as Pruszcz was known) before 1945), a small manufacturing town just outside Danzig/Gdańsk. In 1907, as he set off the study Chemistry at Munich, he seemed to be destined to follow his father's example and make his way in life as a pharmacist but by 1908 he had become an actor. His first recorded stage appearance took place that year at Schweidnitz in Silesia. Stage roles at the City Theatre in Zittau followed in 1909: that was followed by a longer period as a member of the company at the Lobe Theatre in Breslau/Wrocław between 1910 and 1913. There were probably also stage appearances at Detmold during this time. Sources differ as to the precise chronology of his early years as a theatre actor, however.

=== Dresden ===
Iltz worked between 1913 and 1924 at Dresden's newly built Royal Playhouse, and was still there when, several years after the abdications of the King of Saxony and the German emperor, it was renamed State Playhouse (Staatsschauspiel) for a new republican age. During his first few years at Dresden the Playhouse was under the direction of Karl Zeiss. Iltz built his skills and his reputation as a youthful character actor, while a member of a theatre company that also included Maria Fein and Theodor Becker (who shortly afterwards became a husband and wife partnership). During his years at the State Playhouse, Iltz was also increasingly involved as a producer-director, but there was never any abrupt switch from acting to directing: his public reputation, even when he moved on from Dresden in 1924, was still principally as an actor. He won particular plaudit for the qualities of his speech, for instance when took the title role in Hofmannsthal's "Everyman", that of "Franz Moor" in Schiller's The Robbers, as "Ferdinand" in Intrigue and Love (also by Schiller) and in the title role of Hanns Johst's "The King". In 1920 Iltz appeared in the world premiere production of Walter Hasenclever's expressionist drama "Jenseits" ("Beyond"), under the direction of Berthold Viertel and co-starring with Emanuel Raul and Alice Verden. The Dresden production of the play, intended to "invent a new dimension and language on stage", resonated strongly with audiences and critics. The production was subsequently toured, first to the Landestheater in Stuttgart and then, in 1922, to the Lobe Theatre in Breslau, where Iltz had been a member of the company before the war. Iltz had by this time acquired a high profile as a stage presence in the theatre world. Max Brod dedicated his one-act drama Die Höhe des Gefühls (The Height of Feeling) – written in 1911 and published in 1913 but premiered only in 1918, at Dresden – to Iltz, whom the playwright described as "the outstanding presenter of [the star role of] Orosmin". During and after 1921, influenced by the work of Max Reinhardt, Iltz became ever more engaged with his stage directing work at the Dresden Playhouse. According to one contemporary he came across, at this time, as "youthful, fresh, energetic, determined, with rather a boyish manner". Some fellow thespians were more than bemused by his "dictatorial approach", and the trades union congress even referenced his "anti-social conduct". He was nevertheless very successful in terms of results.

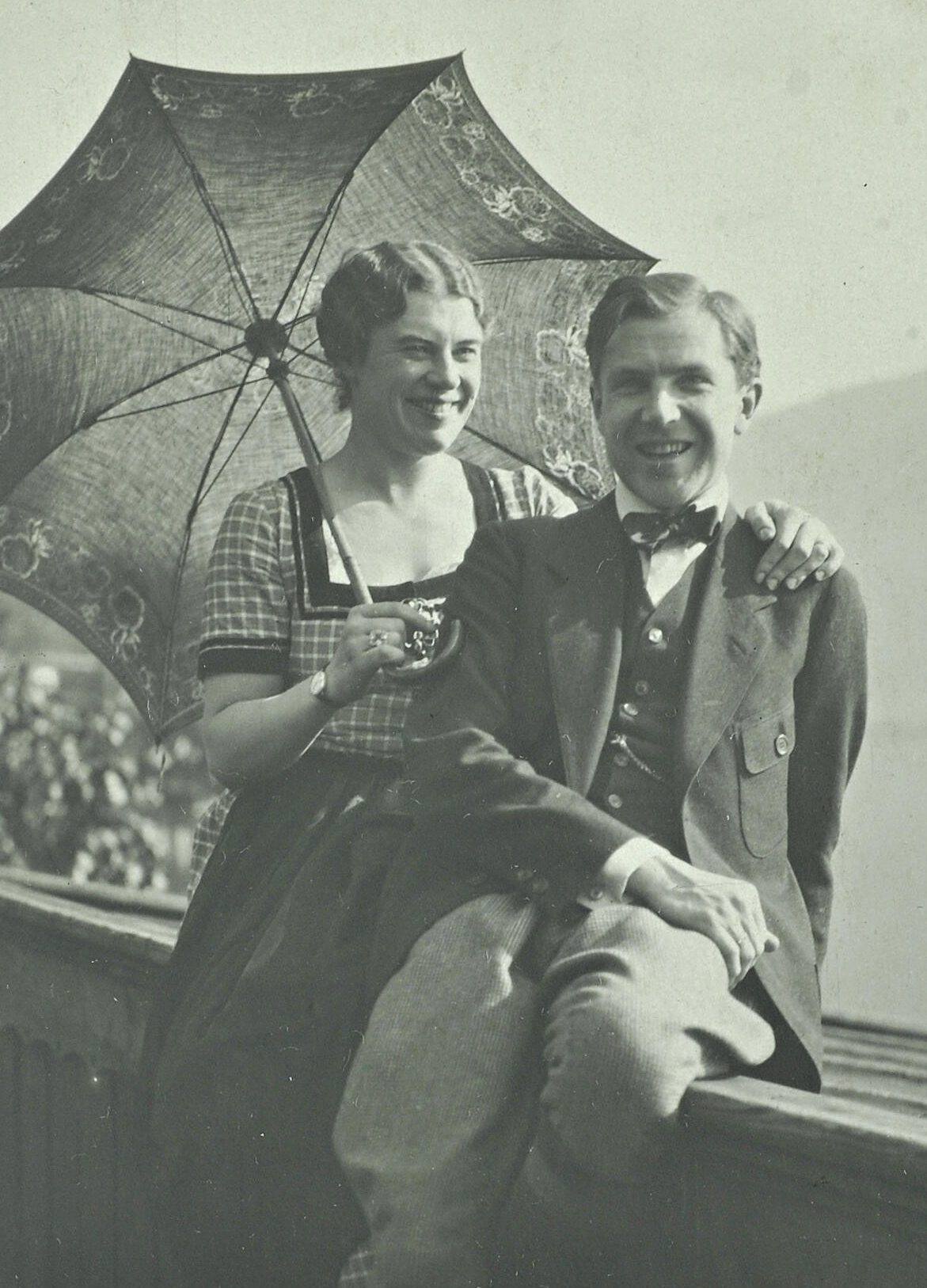
Walter Bruno Iltz and Helena Forti at the time of their marriage

Helena Forti (1884–1942) was a stage soprano who arrived at the Semperoper in Dresden in 1911, a couple of years before Iltz moved to the Royal Playhouse across the river. Walter Bruno Iltz married Helena Forti in 1917. Forti remained a member of the opera company in Dresden from 1911 till 1924, but she also appeared at other prestigious venues. On 1914 she appeared as Sieglinde in Walküre and as Kundry in Parsifal at the Bayreuth Festival. Through Helena's work at Bayreuth the couple came to know Siegfried and Winifred Wagner. In 1916 Walter Iltz's wife sang the lead role of "Myrtocle" in the premiere performance of Eugen d'Albert's Die toten Augen. In 1924, however, having reached the age of 40, she retired from her performing career and worked in support of her husband's, training performers in stage acting technique behind the scenes at Gera and Düsseldorf where, between 1924 and 1937, he was employed as a Theatre Director.

=== Gera ===
In 1924 Iltz took over as General Intendant (Theatre Director) at the Princely Reuß Theatre in Gera. The Reuß Theatre enjoyed a unique status during the republican years, benefitting from the protective and enthusiastic support of Prince Heinrich XLV of Reuß, to whom Iltz assigned various dramaturgist responsibilities. For these the prince was well equipped by virtue of his broad literary knowledge. The theatre was neither supported nor encumbered by municipal or state funding, but it nevertheless managed to avoid becoming an island of rich privilege. The auditorium had space for 1,100 and the recently renovated building was suitable for plays, stage shows, operas and operettas.

Iltz became known as a youthful modernising theatre director, open minded and enthusiastic. During his three seasons at Gera he incorporated many new dramatists into the theatre calendar. One was Ernst Barlach. Iltz himself staged Barlach's "Die gute Zeit" (1925) and "Der arme Vetter" (1927). There was an early production of Brecht's Man Equals Man. Other relatively youthful playwrights featured were Arnolt Bronnen, Walter Hasenclever, Georg Kaiser Carl Zuckmayer and Fritz von Unruh. Many plays had their world premieres at Gera under Iltz's direction. These included works by Alexander Lernet-Holenia ("Saul"), André Gide ("The prodigal's return"), Diderot ("Est-il Bon? Est-il méchant?") and Rosso di San Secondo.

For the 1925/26 season the 22-year-old avant-garde dance performer Yvonne Georgi accepted an engagement to lead the Gera theatre's dance troupe. She opened with a dance evening comprising Felix Petyrek's "Arabian suite" (featuring Georgi herself in a solo dance performance), Darius Milhaud's "Saudades do Brasil" and "Persisches Ballett" by Egon Wellesz. Georgi's innovative cheerfully comedic choreography caused a sensation across Germany, although according to at least one source the conservative locally based theatre goers of Gera mostly stayed away. On New Year's Eve at the end of 1925 there was a production of Vittorio Rieti's and Diaghilev's only recently unveiled choral-ballet "Barabau". Even critics from Berlin attended, and the production was toured both to the Leipzig Playhouse and to the Berlin People's Theatre. During 1926 Giorgi also choreographed Stravinsky's Pulcinella to widespread acclaim. Nevertheless, as 1926 drew to a close the entire dance troupe at Gera's Princely Reuß Theatre was dismissed "due to lack of public interest". Yvonne Georgi moved on to Hanover where her first evening production was of her own version of Pulcinella.

Iltz actively sought out young talent, undertaking trips across Germany to attend performances at small provincial theatres unannounced and normally unrecognised, on his talent spotting missions. While he was at Gera he "discovered" and recruited Hans Otto, Paul Hoffmann, Oscar Fritz Schuh and, in 1927, the young Bernhard Minetti. It was also on one of his talent scouting trips that he came across Dorothea Neff, whom many years later he engaged to work for him in a succession of leading roles at the People's Theatre in Vienna, and who would later pay tribute to Iltz's courage and steadfastness during a murderous time (after 1938).

Audience numbers at the Princely Reuß Theatre in Gera peaked under Iltz's directorship, at 240,832 for the 1925/26 season.

=== Düsseldorf ===
Between 1927 and 1937 Iltz was employed as General Intendant (Theatre Director) at the City Theatre in Düsseldorf. The City Theatre was a large prestigious establishment with two auditoria, used not just for stage dramas but also for opera and operetta. Following the death of its formidable co-founder-director Louise Dumont, in 1933 the Düsseldorf Play House was forcibly placed under a compulsory lease arrangement which effectively removed control from her co-founder-director, Gustav Lindemann, who was still very much alive. But Lindemann was seen by the authorities as unreliable at best, which meant no more performances could be staged with Lindemann in charge. After the government backed "Fighters for German Culture" ("Kampfbund für deutsche Kultur") had successfully choreographed Lindemann's removal from his post, management of the Düsseldorf Play House was entrusted to Iltz, leaving him with a small portfolio of Düsseldorf theatres to manage and fill. It is impossible to consider Iltz's ten years as Theatre Director in Düsseldorf without reference to the political context. The years between 1927 and 1932 were marked by intensifying populism across Germany which was reflected in growing political polarisation in Berlin, which increasingly spilled onto the streets. With voters rejecting moderation, parliament became deadlocked and government became increasingly ineffective except where it was deemed necessary to enact legislation by "emergency decree". This situation ended in January 1933 when the Hitler government exploited the political chaos (which its supporters had done so much to generate) to take power. Germany was quickly transformed into a one- party dictatorship. During Iltz's final four years at Düsseldorf, between 1933 and 1937, the shrill racism and antisemitism which the populist leaders had used to stir up hatred and anxieties on the streets emerged as a core underpinning of government strategy. Theatres were particularly badly impacted because of the large number of theatre people whom the government identified as Jewish. The fact that many people involved in the theatre were also supporters of left-wing causes and parties attracted further unwelcome attention from government backers. Among set designers employed in theatres operating under Iltz's direction were Caspar Neher (a long-standing professional associate of the high-profile left-wing socialist Bertolt Brecht), Hein Heckroth (who displeased Germany's new political masters by refusing to divorce his Jewish wife) and Traugott Müller. The risk to Müller from the new politics were less immediately obvious, although for those who believe that World War II was caused by "Nazism" Müller was also a Hitler victim, in the sense that he was killed in an air raid against Berlin in 1944. The list of stage performers in Düsseldorf who found their livelihoods – and, as matters turned out, their lives – in danger as a result of the 1933 change of government is naturally much longer than the list of affected stage set designers. Karl Paryla, a committed Communist lost his job at Düsseldorf in 1933 and spent most of the Hitler years living and working in Switzerland. Ludwig Schmitz, despite taking the precaution of joining the party in 1937, would find himself branded in 1941 as having undertaken "unworthy conduct" by the authorities, and banned from appearing in film roles. Hanne Mertens had joined the party even sooner, in 1933, but would nevertheless find himself identified as a "fellow traveller of the party's enemies" and then, in 1944, arrested on suspicion of undermining the war effort. During the early months of 1945 Mertens was badly tortured at the concentration camp to which he had been sent at the instigation of the security services in Hamburg, and then, on 21/22/23 April 1945, killed by hanging. To these can be added Wolfgang Langhoff (who also spent many of the Hitler years in Swiss exile) and the Jewish actor Leon Askin who following the murder of his parents and himself suffering serious torture at the hands of government paramilitaries, was able to escape to the United States in 1940. Prominent musicians working under Iltz's direction for whom the National Socialists represented an obvious threat included the (foreign-born) conductor Otto Ackermann (who moved to Switzerland in 1935) and the Jewish conductor Jascha Horenstein (who like others was – eventually – granted U.S. citizenship). How Iltz navigated the twelve years of intensifying pressure to follow Nazi mantras during the Hitler years is an endlessly complex story, most of which is likely to remain for ever untold. There are nevertheless some indications that between 1927 and 1937, as General Intendant (Theatre Director) at the Düsseldorf City Theatre, Iltz was able, presumably by invoking his reputation and applying careful judgment, to resist at least a little of the racist political pressure to which theatres were subjected across Germany during this period.

With the conductor Jascha Horenstein alongside him as the theatre's musical director, Iltz could apply his ideas for supporting Avant-garde productions from the outset. The two of them developed a superb working partnership, which enabled the City Theatre to present, with its musical productions, its own unique profile comparable in its impact to that of the Kroll Opera in Berlin under Klemperer. The theatre's reputation began to resonate far beyond the confines of its home region. However, Horenstein only accepted a full-time appointment at Düsseldorf in 1929. Before that, during his first couple of years as General Intendant. Iltz staged several German modern opera premieres. These early productions were all directed by Friedrich Schramm, with the musical direction entrusted to the conductor Hugo Balzer. They included Hindemith's "Cardillac" in 1927, Stravinsky's "Oedipus rex" in 1928 and "The tsar gets himself photographed" by Kurt Weill, also staged in 1928. Hindemith wrote to Iltz appreciatively: "It was only your Düsseldorf premiere that showed me how "Cardillac" can survive as part of the regular opera repertoire".

In 1929 Jascha Horenstein marked his arrival as Düsseldorf "Kapellmeister" by conducting the world premiere of "Schwanda the Bagpiper" by Jaromír Weinberger. That was followed in 1930 by German premiers of Ernst Krenek's burlesque operetta "Schwergewicht" and Ibert's Angélique, along with a spectacular production of Alban Berg's "Wozzeck", performed in the presence of the composer. Berg wrote to Iltz with careful precision, "I am happier with this production than with some premieres: yes, it makes me proud". The artistically and financially successful 1930/31 season brought the world premiere of "The Soldiers" by Manfred Gurlitt, and based on the 1776 stage play of the same name by Jakob Michael Reinhold Lenz, and concluded with a "Modern Opera Week", which was advertised with the sub-title ""Hauptwerke der modernen Musik" ("Principal works of modern music"). The works featured were Janáček's "From the House of the Dead" (in a production which Iltz directed himself), "The Lindbergh Flight" by Bertolt Brecht and Kurt Weill, Stravinsky's "Soldier's story" and another performance of "Wozzeck". All were conducted by Horenstein. The world premiere of what turned out to be Hans Pfitzner's final opera, "Das Herz", came later in 1931. One Düsseldorf highlight of the 1932 season was a production of Verdi's Macbeth (opera). Another, in a production which Iltz directed personally, with Horesntein in charge of the music, was of the newly released opera "The Pledge", authored and composed by the formidable twosome, Kurt Weill of Caspar Neher. The Düsseldorf production opened on 12 April 1932, just a month after the work had its premiere at Berlin under the direction of Carl Ebert. "The Pledge" nevertheless created difficulties for Iltz when the "Fighters for German Culture" ("Kampfbund für deutsche Kultur") demanded that the production be closed down on race grounds. (Kurt Weill was Jewish.)

It would take some weeks to discover how change of government in January 1933 would impact theatres in general, and the Düsseldorf City Theatre in particular. That year's productions included Hermann Reutter's "Prodigal's return" (based on the short story originally written by André Gide in 1907), along with the world premiere of "Der Rossknecht" (based on Richard Billinger's 1931 stage drama, and featuring the dramatic soprano Erna Schlüter) by Winfried Zillig, whose work had been personally recommended to Iltz a couple of years earlier by no lesser authority than Zillig's teacher, Arnold Schoenberg. The performances of "Der Rossknecht" were all conducted by Jascha Horenstein. However, the Düsseldorf production had to be discontinued after the brutal change of government in January 1933. It is nevertheless apparent that by this time, even in Berlin, there was a widespread appreciation among the culturally aware that under the leadership of Iltz and Horenstein Düsseldorf had become a torch bearer for progressive stage productions in Germany. However, with antisemitism made newly respectable with the takeover of political institutions by populists, it had become necessary to pay attention to political voices asserting that Jascha Horenstein embodied the "Judaization" of German theatre. Through 1932 the theatre was being targeted by an antisemitic letter-writing campaign, and during the early months of 1933 this was complemented by a gruesomely unrestrained smear campaign in the region's newspapers which was timed, according to some reports, to coincide with the fiftieth anniversary of the death of Richard Wagner.

A series of antisemitic laws declared were enacted during April 1933, and further extended and elaborated during the Summer and Autumn. This was complemented by a first wave of politically and racially motivated arrests, which persuaded the more prescient among high-profile potential government targets that Germany was no longer safe. Jascha Horenstein resigned his Düsseldorf post in March 1933 and fled to Paris, to be joined a little later by his wife and two-week-old son. Horestein's hurried departure was followed by a return to the Düsseldorf City Theater for Hugo Balzer who had spent the previous four years in a comparable position at Freiburg. Balzer was evidently an apolitical musician, and no great fan of Hitlerism, but nor was he identified as Jewish. When it came to music-based stage performances, Balzer's repertoire at Düsseldorf concentrated on composers of whom the authorities approved, most particularly Wagner, Mozart and Richard Strauss. In 1934 there was a production of Ariadne auf Naxos which employed set designs by Caspar Neher. In the same year Iltz also staged "Tristan und Isolde" with Erna Schlüter, "Walküre" and "Magic Flute", together with Offenbach's ever-popular "Tales of Hoffmann". Newer works were not entirely overlooked. Krenek's evidently uncontentious burlesque operetta "Schwergewicht" was revived. 1935 saw a world premiere at Düsseldorf for Ludwig Maurick's "Die Heimfahrt des Jörg Tilmann" (Jörg Tilmann's journey home), a production staged, according to one source, expressly for Alfred Rosenberg's "National Socialist Cultural Communities".

Despite his failure to win provincial audiences round to modern dance during his time at Gera. Iltz's own commitment to the genre remained undimmed. For the 1929/30 season he engaged Ruth Loeser, a former student of Rudolf von Laban, as the City Theatre's first solo ballet dancer and head of dance. With help from Aurel von Milloss he was thereby able to push through a significantly enhanced role for ballet at Düsseldorf. In a pioneering move he set out to adapt the opera stage at an opera house as the "Dance stage for the City of Düsseldorf", with a ballet troupe given the independence to perform its own repertoire, rather than being permanently subservient to opera house programming when setting their programmes. Between 1929 and 1933 Loeser presided over a troupe of between 8 and 13 ballet dancers presenting "classical forms of dance in a sardonically "classical forms of dance in a sardonically modern style". She choreographed a new dance programme for Darius Milhaud's "Saudades do Brasil" and two ballet suites by Stravinsky "for small orchestra". Loesser had to be dismissed in 1933: she was Jewish. It is not known what became of her. Her departure did not mark an end to stage ballet at Düsseldorf. For the 1933/34 season he organised a "German Dance Masters" series featuring guest artistes such as Harald Kreutzberg, Niddy Impekoven, Yvonne Georgi and Gret Palucca. Iltz also invited Mary Wigman and her "German Dance Festival Berlin 1934" troupe to stage a guest performance at Düsseldorf on 19 February 1935.

Several of Iltz's theatre productions after 1933 were direct responses to political "requests". These included "Schlageter", a stage work by the National Socialist playwright Hanns Johst (dedicated to "Düsseldorf, the Schlageter City"). The play helped to transform the World War veteran and anti-occupation activist Albert Leo Schlageter into a Nazi icon. Other (subsequently forgotten) overtly political Düsseldorf stage productions from this time includes world premieres of "Das Gastmahl der Götter" by Paul Joseph Cremers and the so-called "Goya" drama, "Genie ohne Volk", written by Viktor Warsitz for inclusion in the "Fourth National Theatre Week" on 15 June 1937, with Werner Krauss in the lead role. On 23 September 1936, supported by a nationwide publicity campaign, the theatre unveiled a reworking by Iltz himself of Grabbe's nineteenth century stage drama Die Hermannsschlacht. The Iltz adaptation consisted of a heavily cut down "collage" based on what Grabbe had conceived as a three-day production. It was presented on the Düsseldorf stage as a so-called "Führerdrama", indicating official endorsement and, with the populists not yet discredited, virtually guaranteeing success with audiences. The Iltz version unapologetically referenced contemporary political trends.

=== Conflicts with the party ===
In March 1932 Iltz had a serious disagreement with local leaders of the "Fighters for German Culture" ("Kampfbund für deutsche Kultur") when they called for the production of Kurt Weill's "The Pledge" at the City Theatre to be abruptly closed. A month later the regional party leadership ("Gauleitung") for Düsseldorf called for a "German game plan". For the avoidance of doubt, the call was accompanied by a demand that at the City Theatre General Intendant Walter Iltz should put German artists ahead of Jews: "We want the German artists, who see themselves as the servants and creators of Germany's cultural assets. It troubles us to see the best German art twisted in a Jewish way." (Note: "Wir wollen den deutschen Künstler, der sich als Diener und Gestalter deutschen Kulturgutes fühlt! Wir sind es leid, beste deutsche Kunst in einer jüdischen Manier verborgen zu sehen!) That year and the next, Iltz was on the receiving end of plenty more lobbying along similar lines. Iltz robustly opposed the NSDAP, displaying what, in hindsight, can be seen as a very remarkable degree of courage. Colleagues and employees at the theatre were forbidden from complying with the invidious pressures. He also produced a nine-page carefully crafted reply on the racism issue, in which he attempted to argue the case in terms to which his populist opponents and their mentors might be able to relate. in which he pointed out how many of the greatest masterpieces in Germany's long cultural heritage had been the result of close collaboration between Jews and non-Jews. He cited the example of Mozart's work with Lorenzo Da Ponte (Note: Lorenzo Da Ponte was a celebrated and prolific libbrettist who wrote the libretti for three of Mozart's most loved operas, The Marriage of Figaro (1786), Don Giovanni (1787), and Così fan tutte (1790).) and the productive collaboration of the composer Otto Nicolai with the (Jewish) librettist Salomon Hermann Mosenthal. He insisted on his duty to direct the theatre for which he was responsible and refused to implement the "personnel policy" demanded by the National Socialists. In summary:

- "... the repertoire of a publicly subsidised playhouse has to be the based on a consistently applied will, and that will can only be that of the theatre director. He is required to combine expertise and theatre experience with an artistic sense informed by objectivity and a truly impartial judgment. ... While I am in fundamental agreement with your opinion on the 'foreigners question', that German personnel are to be preferred to foreigners of equal ability, when it comes to employing Jews I depart fundamentally from your viewpoint. ... Here there are differences that even a blind antisemitism – which you yourself do not represent here – could hardly dispute: namely the difference between the demon of Judaism, which is certainly worth fighting against, and the spirit of Judaism. To be sure we are all bound together by race and as a people, but alongside and above the laws of nature we still must take account of human spirit and will. In the performing and representative arts, in particular, there are many Jews who have a profound love and admiration for Germany's cultural richness, and who place themselv4es at the service of German artistry. Outsiders, in particular, can often recognise the cultural richness than we ourselves".

Walter Bruno Iltz: Letter in reply to the Düsseldorf NSDAP regional leadership, Organisation department I – Department for Race and the Arts, 28 April 1932

Along with the addressees, Iltz sent copies of the letter to the "Deutscher Bühnenverein" (loosely, "German Theatres Association") and to fellow theatre directors across Germany. Ernst Josef Aufricht – a Berlin theatre director who would emigrate to Switzerland in 1933, and later to France and then America – was among the first to congratulate Iltz: "I marvel at your incredibly clever and clean reply". Kurt Weill was also impressed: "You've always had sufficient personal conviction and courage to follow through on what you believed to be artistically important and necessary". Openly defending Jewish colleagues as he did, especially in the light of the government mandated intensification of race hatred after the 1933 change of government, led to a deepening hostility against Iltz in government circles. In February 1933, just a couple of weeks after the Hitler government took power in Berlin, he was the target of a deeply menacing and personalised press attack in "Volksparole", the Düsseldorf region daily newspaper of the NSDAP in connection with the fiftieth anniversary of the Wagner's death. The catalyst for the attack was the City Theatre's anniversary celebrations and the involvement in them of the venue's (Jewish) musical director, Jascha Horenstein:

- "Unfortunately Mr. Horenstein conducted the opening concert. We must write 'unfortunately', because it is unthinkable that the German Theatre in Düsseldorf can find no German conductor for a Wagner celebration, meaning that Mr Sascha (sic (Note: "Sascha" (or "Саша" or "Sasha") is a Russian language name, most frequently applied as a diminutive for "Alexander".)) Horenstein must be called to the rostrum. This shows a total disregard for what is required. When a German is celebrated the matter is a German one and needs to be dealt with accordingly: this is not the case where Jascha Horenstein conducts. This should not upset Jascha Horenstein: it is no more than an irrefutable statement of fact ... Wagner was one of a few men who saw long before the rest just how Jews are able to endanger and damage the German way of life. ... Mayor Lehr and Theatre Director Iltz will need to adapt. Otherwise, some day soon it will become necessary to find a way to ensure that in German Düsseldorf the real German spirit and all the branches of German culture will be properly valued. ..... Mr. Iltz still has not understood the signs of the times, and does not want to be parted from his darling [Jewish music director]. Mr. Iltz, who did not want to hear when there was still time, will now have to watch while those things that he has neglected to undertake of his own free will, will be carried through in defiance of his will. The Russian Jew Horenstein must disappear from the Düsseldorf theatre."

Alexander Schneider, writing in "Volksparole", 13 February 1933

That was far from being an end to the matter. On the evening of 7 March 1933 Nazi paramilitaries laid siege to the theatre during a performance of Fidelio. Horenstein was conducting. The attackers demanded Horenstein's immediate removal. Horenstein had to break off and flee the theatre mid-performance. Necessary relocation permits were provided to enable him to leave Düsseldorf legally, and by the end of March 1933 he had fled to Paris (where on account of previous tours under happier circumstances he already had an established professional reputation). In Düsseldorf it was not the men who had attacked the theatre who found themselves with questions to answer over the incident. Regional Party chief Friedrich Karl Florian launched a police investigation against Iltz. In April 1933 the city council applied to the newly installed Minister of the Interior for Prussia (also, at the national level, a Minister without portfolio), Hermann Göring. The application was refused. Iltz's freedom of manoeuvre in determining how to run his own theatre was nevertheless greatly diminished, most obviously through the installation of a new dramaturge at his side. Alexander Schneider, the man in question, was an enthusiastic supporter of the National Socialist agenda and also prominent as a locally influential newspaper man and theatre critic. He was indeed the man whose menacing antisemitic contribution in the "Volksparole" (newspaper) on 13 February 1933 is quoted directly above this paragraph. Iltz was als provided with a helpful "Dienstanweisung" (loosely, "service instruction"), providing the slightly reassuring information that with regard to artistic matters he had a free hand, subject only to the (less reassuring) stipulation that his "game plan" – principally his selection of plays and performers – must comply with the "requirements of the national government".

During 1933 company members identified as Jewish were made to leave the Düsseldorf Theatre. That meant the loss of Leon Askin (1907–2005), Leopold Lindtberg (1902–1984) and Erwin Parker (1903–1987). A number of other Jewish actors and chorus singers along with the dance mistress Ruth Loeser were also forced to leave. The continued presence in the company of the actors Bruno Hübner (1899–1983) and Wolfgang Langhoff (1901–1966) were also determined to be unacceptable by Düsseldorf party leaders. There was no suggestion that either of these last two was Jewish, but both were known communists. After 1933 Walter Iltz increasingly focused on opera productions, while leaving stage drama and concerts to Alexander Schneider, the dramaturge the party had inflicted on the theatre. In 1936 he confided his dissatisfaction to Joseph Goebbels, the Propaganda Minister in Hitler's government between 1933 and 1945, about the deathly atmosphere ("resonanzlose Atmosphäre"). Goebbels had been born in the Rhineland and grown up near Mönchengladbach, not far from Düsseldorf. During December 1933 he attended three productions at the Düsseldorf Theatre, after which he became a possibly implausible but nevertheless effective protector at the highest level of government for Wolfgang Iltz between the end of 1933 and 1945.

In 1937 Iltz's contract as Düsseldorf Theatre Director came up for renewal, but the city administration refused to renew it. His re-appointment was evidently vetoed by and/or on behalf of the local party. The detailed background is unclear, but the fact that Iltz was still not a party member, and the way in which he had stood out against government antisemitism, were clearly factors. Iltz secured a new position as a Theatre Director in Stuttgart, but the necessary arrangements were blocked after party leaders in the Düsseldorf city administration intervened with colleagues in Stuttgart. The mayor of Düsseldorf, Hans Wagenführ, told Joseph Goebbels that Iltz was "being badly treated by the [Düsseldorf] authorities". An entry in Goebbels diary dated 14 January 1937 records what was probably the same communication, but differently contextualised: "Mayor Wagenführ from Düsseldorf wants to get rid of Theatre Director Iltz. I reject that". (Note: Am 14. Jänner 1937 schrieb Goebbels in sein Tagebuch: "Oberbürgermeister Wagenführ-Düsseldorf will den Intendanten Iltz abstechen. Ich lehne das ab". There is a further reference to the matter in Goebbels' diary entry for 5 February 1937.) In a subsequent telephone conversation Goebbels obtained confirmation that the reason for the non-renewal of Iltz's contract by the authorities was that he had "given preferential treatment to Jews and Communists", [which was] contrary to National Socialism. Mindful of the dangers – both professional and personal – that the hostility of the party presented, on 28 November 1937 Iltz applied for party membership, but on 31 December 1937 his application was declined by the Düsseldorf-Pempelfort local party branch, citing his "Liberalist-Marxist tendencies" and adding that he had not sufficiently "come into line with the spirit of National Socialism".

At the 1937 "Reichsfestspiele" drama festival in Heidelberg Iltz staged a production of Romeo and Juliet. The lead actors were Gisela Uhlen – still only 18, Lina Carstens and René Deltgen. The set designer was Traugott Müller. (The revitalisation and relaunch of the Heidelberg "Reichsfestspiele" in 1934 had been a project headed up by Propaganda Minister Joseph Goebbels, who thereafter took a characteristically hands-on approach to supporting and promoting it.)

=== Vienna ===
On 1 September 1938 the Minister for Public Enlightenment and Propaganda appointed Walter Iltz General Intendant (Theatre Director) at the German People's Theatre (as it was commonly advertised at the time) in Vienna. The theatre was the largest "speech theatre" in the German-speaking world at the time, and had recently become the first theatre to be officially included as part of the government's Strength Through Joy programme, under the auspices of the German Labour Front. The government intended that the theatre should become a show-piece of theatre for the masses, which was not wholly out of line

with existing practices and traditions. Iltz succeeded in skilfully juggling the political pressures and artistic imperative to create an atmosphere of relatively calm through the way that he managed the institution, while also protecting the theatre company even as the outside pressures intensified following the outbreak of war in September 1939. Actors whom he engaged in Vienna included O. W. Fischer, Curd Jürgens, Gert Fröbe, Paul Hubschmid and, a little later, Judith Holzmeister, Inge Konradi, Dorothea Neff, Annie Rosar, Lotte Lang, Karl Skraup and Robert Lindner. Leon Epp, who himself would become a distinguished director of the during the 1950s and 1960s, made his People's Theatre stage début in Johann Nestroy's "Einen Jux will er sich machen" (loosely, "He'll have himself a good time") and was thereafter called upon by Iltz to direct theatre productions himself. Another future director of the theatre who had his first opportunities as a play director under the tutelage of Walter Iltz was Gustav Manker, whose first production was shown in 1942.

Somehow Iltz managed to create programmes which were steeped in Viennese tradition, while at the same time avoiding annoyance to the country's political leaders, who expected theatre to function as a faithful propaganda medium. He took care over the appropriate allocation of productions to play directors. Productions that risked becoming seen as politically he would direct himself, or allocate either to Walter Ullmann or to the uncompromisingly Hitlerite Günther Haenel. The actor-director Günther Haenel was given the "high-quality literary pieces" from 1942. During the final couple of years under Iltz's directorship there were even one or two productions that manifested unambiguous opposition to aspects of government policy. This development was consistent with Iltz's management style. After Erhard Siedel left the company he recruited Haenel, who soon became the centre of a group of artistes hostile to the government and were prepared, very cautiously, to express their political attitudes from the stage. Thespian contemporaries such as Inge Konradi, Gustav Manker and Judith Holzmeister would all later recall this development with satisfaction.

For attentive audience members Haenel's productions of Shaw's "Saint Joan" (1943) and of Ferdinand Raimund's magical fantasy piece "Diamond of the Spirit King" (1944), both using stage sets by Gustav Manker, were unmistakable invitations to political resistance, both of them tolerated by Iltz. For "... Spirit King", Haenel and Manker created a savage parody of various stylistic features favoured by the authorities in Nazi Germany for the play's "Land of Truthfulness and Strict Customs", in which only liars are to be found. Manker's stage set mercilessly referenced pseudo-classical Nazi architecture, and the "Land of Truthfulness", and ended up looking like an exaggerated "end station of the National Socialist paradise". The costumes parodied the style and look of the "Bund Deutscher Mädel", the National Socialist answer to the Anglosphere's Girl Guides, and the only permitted youth organisation for girls in Hitler's Germany. The performers' hair was set in implausibly long blonde braids, with the teutonic centre-partings favoured for the Hitler Youth. The play features a presenter/narrator, "Veritatius". This part was played by Karl Kalwoda, whose interpretation was particularly bold. He declaimed his lines as a grotesque parody of Adolf Hitler in full orator mode.

The significance of Iltz's instinctively liberal approach as Theater Director at the Vienna People's Theatre after 1938, and the ways in which – apparently through nothing more mysterious than the sheer force of his powerful personality and wide-ranging talent, political sensibilities, reputation and connections – he was able to look after the actors and other members of the company, was recalled appreciatively by the actress Inge Konradi long after Iltz himself had retired and died:

- "That the People's Theatre became an island for us, is thanks to the huge commitment and courage of Theatre Director Iltz. You really have to set him on a podium: he was the life saver of the People's Theatre. He had many highly stressed artists in the company, whom he protected through the war years, and many of whom later achieved life-long successful theatre careers. He knew exactly the risk he was taking when he entrusted Haenel with the productions of "Saint Joan" and "Diamond of the Spirit King". He was a man of very exceptional personal courage." (Note: "Daß das Volkstheater eine Insel für uns war, ist dem großen Einsatz und Mut von Walter Bruno Iltz zu verdanken. Man müsste ihn eigentlich auf ein Podesterl stellen, denn er war der Lebensretter des Volkstheaters. Er hat viele belastete Künstler an seinem Haus gehabt, sie über den Krieg hin beschützt und viele unkündbare Stellungen erreicht. Er hat genau gewusst welches Risiko er eingeht, wenn er Haenel mit der Regie für ‚Die heilige Johanna' und ‚Der Diamant des Geisterkönigs' beauftragt. Sein persönlicher Mut besitzt Seltenheitswert".)

Inge Konradi, quoted by Evelyn Schreiner in "100 Jahre Volkstheater. Theater, Zeit, Geschichte. Jugend und Volk", Wien 1989

After 1942 the inevitability of German victory in the war was no longer assured, and by 1944 military defeat had appeared on the eastern horizon, discernible even to many of the government's most fervent adherents. In August 1944 Joseph Goebbels, whose portfolio of job titles by now included "Reichsbevollmächtiger für den totalen Kriegseinsatz", proclaimed the "Total wartime deployment of the cultural workers". The Vienna People's Theatre, which had already been badly damaged by American bombing on 12 March 1944, closed down on 1 September 1944. When it reopened in May/June 1945, the war would be over: both the theatre and the city of Vienna would have been placed under new management.

=== After 1945 ===
During 1946/47 Iltz was employed as General Intendant (Theatre Director) at the City Theatre in Nuremberg, with a contract that ran to 31 August 1947. Nuremberg had ended up under U.S. military occupation and on 15 February 1947 the military authorities withdrew the permit necessary to complete his contract. It had become known that "in Vienna he had become the director of a discovered Nazi theatre". Records indicate that the military authorities determined at an early stage that the denunciation had been traced to the "machinations of professionally interested and politically implicated persons", but the dismissal stood. Recognising the injustice of his situation, Iltz launched an appeal with the Nuremberg Court of Arbitration. He concluded with the assertion that he had "never sympathised with the [National Socialist] party". A Denazification Commission later backed his position with a clear assessment of their own: "... on the Jewish question, Iltz took a courageous attitude". (Note: "... dass er in der 'Judenfrage' eine 'mutige Haltung' eingenommen hatte".)

Proceedings instigated against Iltz before a Court of Arbitration, launched on the catch-all basis of the 1946 "Law for Liberation from National Socialism and Militarism" ("Befreiungsgesetz") were discontinued early on during 1947 on the basis of a determination that the suspect had "at no time [advocated] for the [Nazi] party in any propagandistic sense". (Note: ".... zu keiner Zeit in propagandistischem Sinne für die Partei [eingesetzt hatte]".) A further encounter involving a Denazification Committee took place two years later, by which time Iltz had relocated to Braunschweig, some 50 km east of Hanover:

Iltz submitted an application for membership of the National Socialist Party on 31 October 1938. (Note: The date on which Iltz's membership application was rejected by the party is not consistently given in the various sources.) There were no other troubling links with the NSDAP. On the Jewish question, Iltz took a courageous approach. During his time [in charge of the theatre] at Vienna he tried, as far as possible, to keep the spirit of National Socialism well away from the 'Strength Through Joy' theatre stages. The hearing before the Nuremberg Court of Arbitration was discontinued following a finding that the subject [of this enquiry] never sympathised with the party.
– Central Denazification Committee for culture-sector workers, City of Hanover, 7 April 1949

In 1947 Iltz took over as Intendant (Theatre Director) at the City Theatre in Braunschweig, a large and traditionally prosperous town midway between Hanover and Magdeburg which had narrowly ended up in the British occupation zone after 1945. He remained at Braunschweig for four years, till 1951. The theatre had been virtually destroyed by Anglo-American bombing during October 1944, but under the determined leadership of the architect Daniel Thulesius, helped by the literally "hands-on support" of his students, it was rebuilt after the war, becoming in 1948 one of the first of the destroyed city theatres in Germany to be restored to a usable condition. Under Iltz' leadership the theatre acquired the "Wunder von Braunschweig" soubriquet in some quarters, attracting the largest audiences of any theatre in what became, after May 1949, the German Federal Republic (West Germany).

=== Return to Düsseldorf ===
Iltz seems never to have become fully settled at Braunschweig: in 1951 the opportunity arose to return to the Rhineland, where he had built his career and reputation during the 1920s and 1930. In 1951 he accepted the position of General Intendant (Theatre Director) at the City Theatre in Düsseldorf. The contract was concluded on 6 April 1951. Iltz was by this time 65, and his appointment to the Düsseldorf position was seen as a "short-term solution" by the theatre administrators, but he very quickly established himself for a new generation of critics and audiences for providing "solid musical theatre with interesting accents". A full return of live theatre to Düsseldorf after the war took some time to achieve, but when Iltz arrived in 1951, the stellar actor-director Gustaf Gründgens was already installed at the city theatre with a directorial remit, and a division of responsibilities was immediately established whereby Iltz handled the musical dramas while Gründgens organised and directed the speech drama side of the operation. Five months later, in September 1951, the speech drama was transferred out to the newly (re-)opened "New Playhouse" (subsequently superseded) nearby, along the Jahnstraße.

At the City Theatre Iltz, as before, attached very great importance to dance as an integral element in musical theatre. He again engaged Yvonne Georgi, whom he had previous engaged during the early 1920s, and who had emerged since that time as one of the best known choreographers of her generation internationally, having built her career principally in the Netherlands and, more recently, Paris, but returned to Germany in 1951. Georgi remained at Düsseldorf, working for Walter Iltz, for three seasons between 1951 and 1954, building for the theatre a repertoire which in the end extended to 13 ballets. The first, in 1951, used the music of Les Animaux modèles, a ballet suite by Francis Poulenc inspired by La Fontaine's [or Aesop's] Fables. Georgi's production was based on the designs of the theatrical costumier Marcel Escoffier. Another of Georgi's early ballet production under Iltz used music from Carl Orff energetic cantata "Carmina Burana". Later there was a brilliant adaption of the ever-popular Symphonie fantastique by Berlioz.

Some of Iltz's more noteworthy opera productions during this time included the first performances in West Germany of Igor Stravinsky's "Rake's Progress", conducted by Heinrich Hollreiser and Hans Werner Henze's ballet opera Boulevard Solitude. The production of Boulevard Solitude was a joint project by Iltz and Georgi. There was a critically acclaimed production of Salome by Richard Strauss, conducted by Eugen Szenkar (whom Iltz greatly admired), with Inge Borkh starring in the title role. Other highlights were the world premiere of the ballet-comedy Das Goldfischglas by Jurriaan Andriessen (1952) and an evening double bill comprising "Bluebeard's Castle" by Bartók and Stravinsky's "Rite of Spring", again featuring choreography by Yvonne Georgi.

1956 was the year of Iltz's seventieth birthday and of his retirement from the City Theatre. He retired with his second wife, Käthe, to the mountain retreat he purchased with his bride from the tenor Leo Slezak at the time of his first marriage back in 1917. Helena, his first wife, had died in 1942 during the couple's time in Vienna. Her death had come, according to one source, "after a long, severe nervous disorder triggered by her husband's clashes with the Nazi press and the Nazi party in Düsseldorf, which for many years had been "incomprehensible and agonizing" to [them both]".

Walter Bruno Iltz died a couple of weeks short of what would have been his seventy-ninth birthday on 5 November 1965 at "Iltzenhof", his country home in Tegernsee, a small town set in the mountains east of Garmisch.
