= Leon Epp =

Austrian music director, theatre director and actor

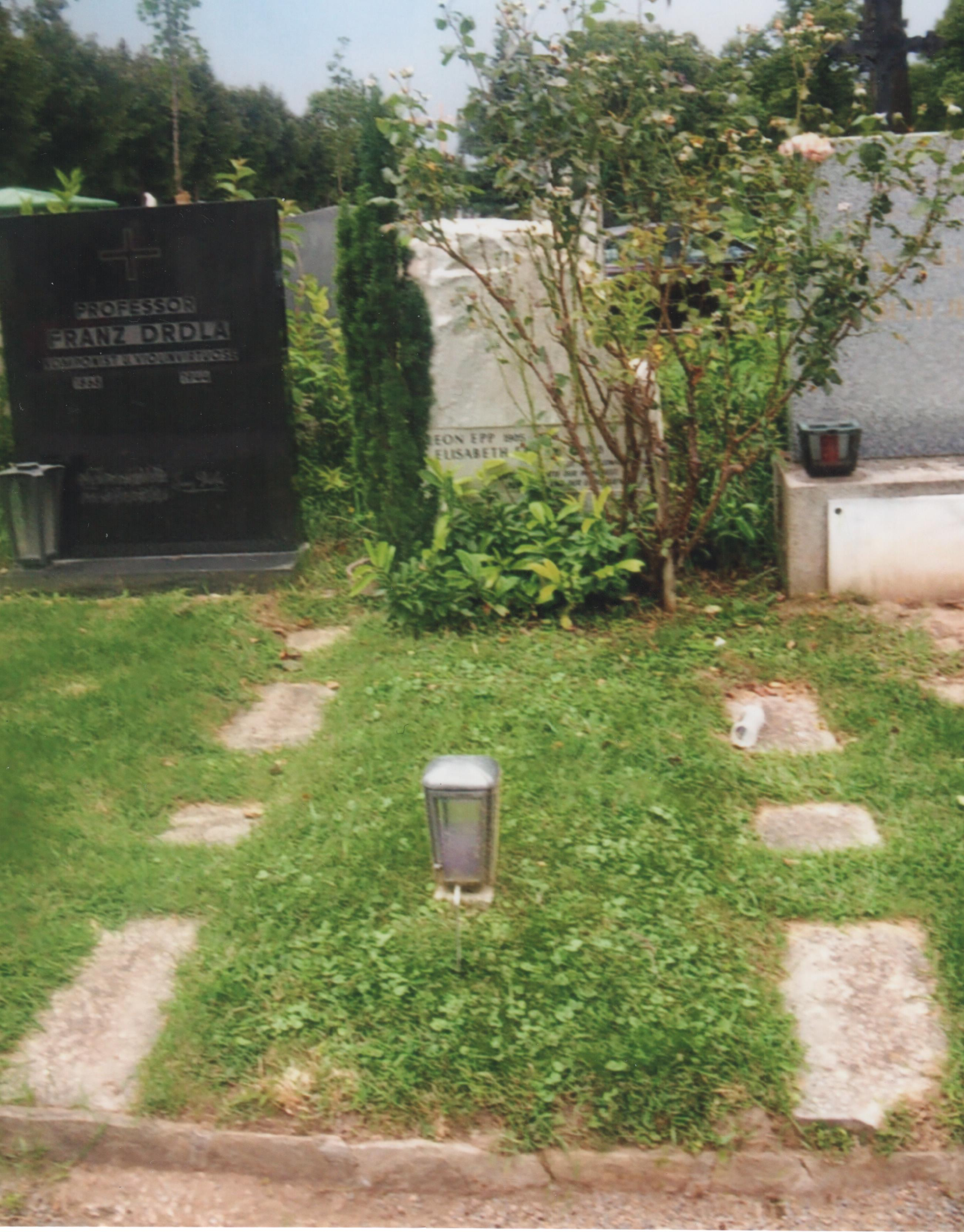
Grave of Leon Epp

Leon Epp (29 May 1905 in Vienna – 21 December 1968 in Eisenstadt) was an Austrian music director, theatre director and actor.

== Career ==
In 1928, aged 22, Epp featured in Endangered Girls (Gefährdete Mädchen), a 1928 Austrian silent drama, directed by Hans Otto Löwenstein and starring Max Landa, Cilly Feindt and Hermine Sterler.

=== Island Theater ===
After working as an actor in Teplitz-Schönau and on many German stages, Epp founded The Island theater in 1937. It was located at Parking 6 in Vienna, in a hall of the Palais Eugen. It opened on 20 September 1937 with Paul Claudel's The Guarantor. The theater featured authors such as Aristophanes (Plutos and The Peace), Goldoni and Pergolesi (The Music Master). On 12 March 1938, the theatre was occupied by the German SS and closed.

Epp occasionally directed the Deutsches Volkstheater (alongside director Walter Bruno Iltz), where he also appeared as Christopher in 1938 in Johann Nestroy's Einen Jux will er sich machen. From 1939 to 1941 Epp became partners with Rudolf Haybach, the head of The "Comedy", a theatre group based in Johannesgasse 4 (later renamed the Metro cinema). The ensemble of "Die Kömödie" included Elisabeth Epp, Helmut Janatsch, Hans Brand and a young Josef Meinrad. By March 1940, "Die Komödie" had staged ten world premieres for a total of 241 performances and ten guest appearances. The "Comedy" opened in February 1940 with Heinrich Zerkaulen's The Rider under Epps' direction; he also portrayed Rudolf II, "one of the most interesting and impressive theatre evenings of the season" (Weltbild). In 1941 a young Oskar Werner debuted in Franz Grillparzer's The Golden Fleece. In 1941, The "Comedy" suffered financial problems, and was sold to the German Labor Front. Epp was unemployed until 1944.

After the war, Epp wanted to found a theater called "Die Insel", managed by the members of The "Comedy" in Johannesgasse. City Council member Viktor Matejka granted the concession and the theatre, renamed by Epp to "Die Insel in der Komödie", opened on 18 October 1945 with Uncle Vanya by Anton Chekhov. The capacity was 453 seats. Regarding the theatre Elisabeth Epp wrote:

The theater "Die Insel in der Komödie" is to be opened as a stage adapted to the needs of a cosmopolitan city, placing itself at the service of poetry and performing all the dramas of world literature, which for budgetary reasons are not seen on other Viennese stages does not Performance of which is particularly close to the care of the modern psychological and problematic drama, as an experimental stage for works of modern dramatic literature.

Epp briefly leased the Renaissance Theater in Vienna in 1948 as an additional venue for light fare. However, the expected revenue did not appear and Epp gave the Renaissance Theater in 1949 to Paul Löwinger.

Epp then staged as an independent director at the Burgtheater

=== Vienna Volkstheater (1952-1968) ===
From 1952 to 1968, Epp directed the Vienna Volkstheater. He staged plays by contemporary dramatists such as Albert Camus, Friedrich Dürrenmatt, Sean O'Casey, Jean Cocteau, Thornton Wilder, Tennessee Williams, William Faulkner, Jean Anouilh, John Osborne, Heinar Kipphardt and great classical productions as well as many new Austrian literature premiers. The motto of the theatre was "It must be dared".

Some of the premieres caused quite a stir, such as the staging of Jean-Paul Sartre's The Dirty Hands (1954/55), which the author tried to prevent with a trip to Vienna, because, in his opinion, it was outdated. In the 1962/63 season, Volkstheater ventured with Mother Courage and her children by Bertolt Brecht. Under the leadership of Hans Weigel and Friedrich Torberg in the so-called "Brecht Boycott " most theatres were closed. The press discussed the Volkstheater's "blockade breakers" premiere on 23 February 1963, with Dorothea Neff and directed by Gustav Manker, who also appeared in The Caucasian Chalk Circle.

The next season, the deputy of Rolf Hochhuth in Austrian premiere started fights in the floor. Epp interrupted the premiere in order to go on stage and announce:

Anyone attending this performance may ask themselves if he was somehow complicit in the things described here.

1961 featured Jean Genet's The Balcony. In 1963 Genet's The Walls was premiered, both times in the decor of the artist Hubert Aratym. A Wedekind cycle was featured as were classics from Shakespeare to Goethe and Schiller.

Epp had special interest in the Austrian folk plays of Ludwig Anzengruber, Johann Nestroy and Ferdinand Raimund. featuring actors Karl Skraup, Hans Putz, Hugo Gottschlich, Fritz Muliar, Walter Kohut, Kurt Sowinetz and Hilde Sochor. Epp staged all of Gustav Manker, who also directed plays there. Schiller's The Robber (1959) was a two-part simultaneous design by Manker. Austrian Modernism from Arthur Schnitzler, Ödön von Horváth, Ferdinand Bruckner and Ferenc Molnár appeared. The world premiere of Helmut Qualtinger's The Execution (1965) was staged by Manker.

Epp discovered many talents such as Nicole Heesters as Gigi (1953), Elisabeth Orth (1958) and Elfriede Irrall, who triumphed in 1961 as Lulu. Guest appearances were offered by Kathe Dorsch as Elisabeth of England, Marianne Hoppe in Strindberg's Dream Play and Hilde Krahl as Lady Macbeth and Libussa.

In 1954, Epp, together with the Chamber of Workers and employees, founded the game series "Volkstheater in the outskirts", bringing productions of the Volkstheater throughout Vienna to bring "culture into the people". After Epp's death in 1968, Manker became his successor.

== Personal life ==
In 1936 Leon Epp married actress Elisabeth Epp. They had three sons. Epp is buried at the Vienna Central Cemetery (Group 40, Number 21) beside Elisabeth.

== Filmography ==
- 1926: The Heart of a German Mother
- 1928: Betrayed innocence

== Awards ==
- 1962: Kainz medal
- 1969: Karl Skraup Prize for Best Director
