= Oscar Fritz Schuh =

German-Austrian opera director, theatre director and opera manager

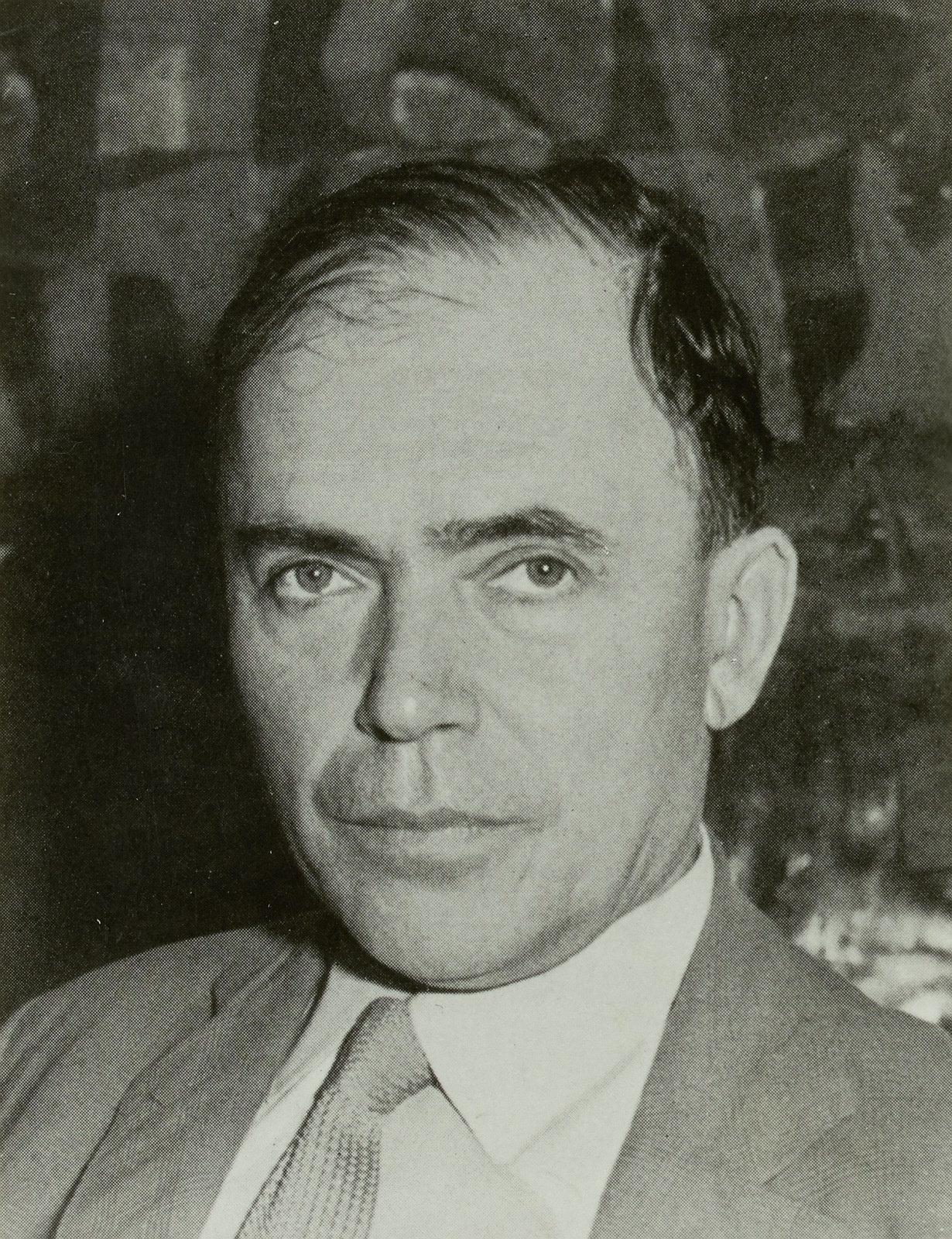
- Schuh in 1960
- Born: 15 January 1904; Munich, Bavaria, German Empire
- Died: 22 October 1984 (aged 80); Großgmain, Austria
- Education: Ludwig-Maximilians-Universität München
- Occupations: Opera director; Theatre director; Opera manager
- Organizations: Vienna State Opera

Oscar Fritz Schuh (15 January 1904 – 22 October 1984) was a German-Austrian opera director, theatre director and opera manager. He is known for directing Mozart operas at the Vienna State Opera and the Salzburg Festival in productions that toured internationally. They focused on the psychology of the characters.

== Life and career ==
Schuh was born in Munich, the son of a veterinarian. He attended the Theresien-Gymnasium, achieving the Abitur in 1921. During his schooling, he already had a contract as a theatre critic for the Berlin magazine Der Fechter, and also wrote essays about theatre history and reviews for other papers. He studied art history and philosophy at the Ludwig-Maximilians-Universität München. In 1923, he was engaged at the Bayerische Landesbühne in Augsburg.

His first theatre direction there was Hauptmann's Hanneles Himmelfahrt. He moved on to Oldenburg, Osnabrück, Staatstheater Darmstadt, Theater Gera (with Walter Bruno Iltz), and Prague. In 1931, he was called by Albert Ruch to work as director and dramaturge at the Hamburg State Opera. He there met the stage designer Caspar Neher who became his professional partner. When Ruch succeeded Karl-Heinz Strohm at the Vienna State Opera, Schuh and Neher went along. They developed the so-called Wiener Mozart-Stil (Vienna Mozart Style) together with the conductors Karl Böhm and Josef Krips, with a focus on the psychology of the characters. Schuh's production, with Böhm, of Così fan tutte set a standard for later versions of the opera. The Wiener Mozart-Ensemble successfully toured to Florence, Nice, Paris, Brussels, Amsterdam and London.

Schuh also worked at the Vienna Burgtheater. In 1953, he became director of Theater am Kurfürstendamm in Berlin, turning more to drama. He also directed for audio plays, including a 1956 production by RIAS of Goldoni's Mirandolina. In 1958, he moved to be Generalintendant (general manager) of the Städtische Bühnen Köln, and finally, in 1963, succeeded Gustaf Gründgens as general manager of the Deutsches Schauspielhaus in Hamburg, holding the position until 1968.

He then worked freelance. In the 1970s, he founded the Salzburger Straßentheater, which he directed, together with his wife, the stage designer and painter Ursula Schuh, until his death.

Schuh died in Großgmain at age 80 and is buried at the Salzburger Kommunalfriedhof.

== Awards ==
Among other awards, Schuh received the Deutscher Kritikerpreis in 1956, and the Salzburg Mozart Medal in 1966.

== Publications ==
- Oscar Fritz Schuh: So war es – war es so? Notizen und Erinnerungen eines Theatermannes.
