= Erna Schlüter =

German soprano (1904–1969)

- Born: 5 February 1904; Oldenburg, German Empire
- Died: 1 December 1969 (aged 65); Hamburg, West Germany
- Occupation: Operatic soprano
- Organizations: Oldenburgisches Staatstheater; Mannheim National Theatre; Stadttheater Düsseldorf; Hamburg State Opera
- Title: Kammersängerin

Erna Schlüter (5 February 1904 – 1 December 1969) was a German operatic dramatic soprano and voice teacher. Beginning as a contralto at the Oldenburgisches Staatstheater in 1922, she moved to the Mannheim National Theatre in 1925 where her voice developed to dramatic soprano, to the Stadttheater Düsseldorf in 1930 where she appeared in 1933 in the world premiere of Winfried Zillig's Der Rossknecht and was awarded the title Kammersängerin. Her last station, from 1940, was the Hamburg State Opera.

Schlüter received European recognition when she appeared as a guest at the Oper Frankfurt, as Brünnhilde in three parts of Wagner's Der Ring des Nibelungen. She then sang the role at the Waldoper festival and the Liceu in Barcelona, among others. For conductor Wilhelm Furtwängler, she was the ideal Isolde, and for composer Richard Strauss the ideal Elektra, when he heard her at the Royal Opera House in London in 1947, conducted by Sir Thomas Beecham. The Erna Schlüter Prize for young singers was established in her memory.

== Life ==
Born in Oldenburg, Schlüter made her stage debut as a contralto at the Oldenburgisches Staatstheater in 1922, as the Third Lady in Mozart's Die Zauberflöte. Her first leading role was Azucena in Verdi's Il trovatore. In the 1924/25 season, she appeared as Orpheus in Gluck's Orfeo ed Euridice. In 1925, she moved to the Mannheim National Theatre, where her voice developed to dramatic soprano. Schlüter appeared as Dalila in Samson and Dalila by Saint-Saëns, Santuzza in Mascagni's Cavalleria rusticana and the Marschallin in Der Rosenkavalier by Richard Strauss. In addition, she performed her first roles in the stage works of Richard Wagner, Ortrud in Lohengrin, and Erda and Fricka in Das Rheingold.

Between 1930 and 1940, Schlüter belonged to the ensemble of the Stadttheater Düsseldorf directed by Walter Bruno Iltz, first as Senta in Wagner's Der fliegende Holländer. In the Italian repertoire, she appeared as Elena in Verdi's Die sizilianische Vesper, the title role of Puccini's Tosca and Leonora in Il trovatore. She also performed Mozart's Donna Anna in Don Giovanni. In 1933, she appeared in the world premiere of Winfried Zillig's Der Rossknecht. In 1933, she was Isolde in Wagner's Tristan und Isolde for the first time.

In 1936, she made a guest appearance at the Oper Frankfurt, as Brünnhilde in three parts of Der Ring des Nibelungen. She performed the same in 1939 in open-air performances at the Waldoper festival in Zoppot. Among her first international guest performances was Brünnhilde in a complete Ring cycle at the Liceu in Barcelona. Wilhelm Furtwängler invited Schlüter to a concert with the Berlin Philharmonic in 1936. Her first surviving radio recording was made in Stuttgart in 1938 when she sang Brünnhilde in Die Walküre alongside Rudolf Bockelmann as Wotan.

In 1938, Schlüter was awarded the title Kammersängerin in Düsseldorf. In 1940, she accepted a permanent engagement at the Hamburg State Opera where she remained until the end of her singing career in 1956. She added Leonore in Beethoven's Fidelio to her repertoire. In 1941 she appeared at the Maggio Musicale Fiorentino as Isolde, repeating the role at La Scala in Milan the following year. In 1943, she sang in Verdi's Requiem with the Vienna Philharmonic conducted by Hans Knappertsbusch. In 1947, Schlüter was engaged by the Metropolitan Opera in New York City as the first German singer after World War II, to appear as Marschallin and Isolde in two series. But as large sections of the audience and the press there were opposed to a singer who had been successful in Germany during the Nazi regime, there was only one performance each of Der Rosenkavalier and Tristan und Isolde, with Max Lorenz as Tristan; the contract for further performances was not fulfilled. Instead, Wilhelm Furtwängler engaged Schlüter as Isolde at the Berlin State Opera, and she appeared at the Salzburg Festival in 1948 as Beethoven's Leonore with him. She appeared in the title role of Elektra by Richard Strauss at the Royal Opera House in London in 1947, conducted by Sir Thomas Beecham and in the presence of the composer. Strauss thanked her and saw in her the fulfillment of Elektra, just as Furtwängler had seen in her the fulfillment of Isolde.

In Hamburg in 1947, Schlüter sang the teacher Ellen Orford in the German premiere of the opera Peter Grimes by Benjamin Britten. The Hessischer Rundfunk took her under contract and Schlüter travelled to Frankfurt to participate in complete recordings of Wagner's Die Walküre as Brünnhilde and Rienzi as Adriano as well as of Die Frau ohne Schatten by Richard Strauss as Färberin. Schlüter prepared herself for a change of subject with the Küsterin in Janáček's Jenufa, which she performed impressively at the Hamburg State Opera in 1953/54, but an illness forced her to retire from the stage. She then worked as a voice teacher.

The obituary in Die Welt described Schlüter's voice: "Her soprano, which had a rich capacity for differentiation between radiant power and a luminous pianissimo, had its own brilliance. Her acting was animated by the power to idealistic upswing, which was mixed with warm feeling."

Schlüter died in Hamburg aged 65. She was buried in the Gertrudenfriedhof in Oldenburg. In January 2005, a private initiative in Oldenburg founded the Erna Schlüter Society Oldenburg. The society awards a singing prize for young singers, The Erna Schlüter Prize. The first recipients in 2005 were the soprano Anja Metzger and the tenor Daniel Behle. In June 2007, the mezzo-soprano Kateřina Hebelková received the prize. In May 2010, the prize was awarded to the soprano Mareke Freudenberg and the bass-baritone Derrick Ballard, in 2013 to the mezzo-soprano Geneviève King, and in 2015 to the mezzo-soprano Hagar Sharvit.

== Recordings ==
The CD-Edition Erna Schlüter contains arias, scenes, concert pieces and Lieder by Beethoven, Weber, Marschner, Halévy, Wagner, R. Strauss, Wolf, Stephan and Braunfels / 2 boxes of 5 CDs, published by the Hamburger Archiv für Gesangskunst:

Beethoven: Fidelio

with Erna Schlüter (Leonore), Lisa Della Casa, Julius Patzak, Rudolf Schock, Ferdinand Frantz
Vienna Philharmonic, conductor: Wilhelm Furtwängler
Live recording 1948, Salzburg Festival – Myto 991.H.025

Halévy: La Juive (in German)

with Erna Schlüter (Rachel), Joachim Sattler, Otto von Rohr
Frankfurt Radio Symphony, conductor: Kurt Schröder
broadcast recording 1951, Frankfurt – Walhall 0029

Marschner: Hans Heiling

with Erna Schlüter (Königin der Erdgeister), Rudolf Gonszar, Hanna Claus, Cornelius van Dyck
Sinfonieorchester des Hessischen Rundfunks, conductor: Winfried Zillig

Richard Strauss: Elektra

with Erna Schlüter (Elektra), Gusta Hammer, Annelies Kupper, Robert Hager
Orchester der Hamburger Oper, conductor: Eugen Jochum
broadcast recording 1944, Hamburg – Line Music/Cantus Classics 500356

Richard Strauss: Elektra

with Erna Schlüter (Elektra), Elisabeth Höngen, Ljuba Welitsch, Paul Schöffler
Royal Philharmonic Orchestra, conductor: Sir Thomas Beecham
live recording 1947, London – Myto 981.H.004

Richard Strauss: Die Frau ohne Schatten

With Erna Schlüter (Färberin), Annelies Kupper, Diana Eustrati, Karl Kronenberg, Heinrich Bensing
Sinfonieorchester des Hessischen Rundfunks, conductor: Winfried Zillig
broadcast recording 1950, Frankfurt – Ponto/Mitridate PO 1015

Richard Wagner: Rienzi

with Erna Schlüter (Adriano), Günther Treptow, Trude Eipperle
Sinfonieorchester des Hessischen Rundfunks, conductor: Winfried Zillig
broadcast recording 1950, Frankfurt – Urania URN 22157

Richard Wagner: Tristan und Isolde (acts 2 and 3)

with Erna Schlüter (Isolde), Ludwig Suthaus, Gottlob Frick, Margarete Klose
Staatskapelle Berlin, conductor: Wilhelm Furtwängler
broadcast recording 1947, Berlin (Admiralspalast) – Archipel ARP-CD 0029

Richard Wagner: Die Walküre

with Erna Schlüter (Brünnhilde), Ferdinand Frantz, Adam Fendt, Aga Joesten, Otto von Rohr
Sinfonieorchester des Hessischen Rundfunks, conductor: Winfried Zillig
broadcast recording 1948, Frankfurt – Line Music/Cantus Classics 50075 – 50076

Richard Wagner: Die Walküre (acts 2 und 3)

with Erna Schlüter (Brünnhilde), Rudolf Bockelmann, Fritz Krauss, Maria Reining, Helene Jung
Orchester des Reichssenders Stuttgart, conductor: Carl Leonhardt
broadcast recording 1938, Stuttgart – Preiser PR 90207

Richard Wagner: Die Walküre – Death proclamation from act 2
Richard Wagner: Siegfried – final scene from act 3

with Erna Schlüter (Brünnhilde), Joachim Sattler
Sinfonieorchester des Hessischen Rundfunks, conductor: Kurt Schröder
broadcast recording 1947, Frankfurt
in: Joachim Sattler singt Wagner – Preiser PR 89193
