= Helena Forti =

German opera singer

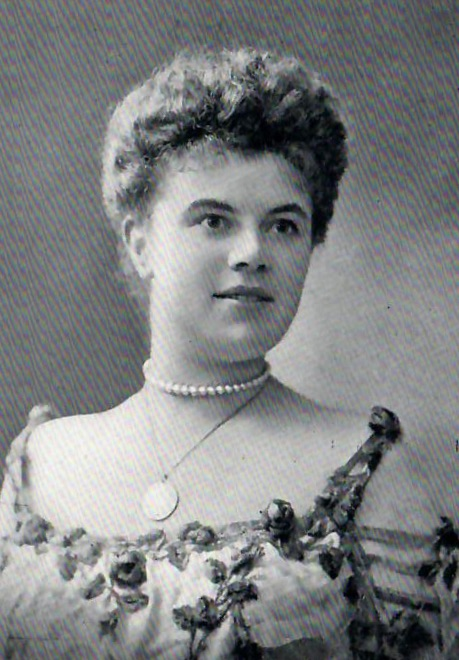
- Portrait of Helena Forti, 1911
- Born: Helene Minna Antonie Therese Fiedler; 25 April 1884; Berlin, German Empire
- Died: 11 May 1943 (aged 59); Vienna, Austria
- Education: Karl Scheidemantel
- Occupations: Actress; Operatic soprano; Acting coach; Voice teacher
- Organizations: Dessau Hofoper; Prag Deutsches Theater; Royal Court Opera Dresden; Gera Theater; Düsseldorf theater
- Spouse: Walter Bruno Iltz (m. 1918)
- Awards: Kgl. sächsische Kammersängerin; Fürstlich-Preußische Kammersängerin

Helena Forti (April 25, 1884 – May 11, 1942) was a dramatic soprano active 1906 – 1924, closely associated with the Dresden royal court opera, known for her beauty, voice and strong stage presence. She sang all Wagner's opera heroines, in Dresden, Bayreuth and internationally. Other repertoire included the title role in Verdi's Aida, Santuzza in Mascagni's Cavalleria and contemporary works such as Marietta in Korngold's Die tote Stadt. She created the role of Myrtocle in d'Albert's Die toten Augen. Her Sieglinde in Die Walküre in Braunschweig was described by the Neue Zeitschrift für Musik as "Equally endowed with youth, beauty and vocal means... (Forti) immerses herself so intensely in her role that one believes the transformation of the virgin-Goddess into a human form." After retiring from the stage she taught voice and acting in Gera, Düsseldorf and Vienna. She died in Vienna, where she lived with her stage director and Intendant husband, Walter Bruno Iltz.

== Family ==
Helene Minna Antonie Therese Fiedler was born in Berlin, on April 25, 1884. An alternative birth date is 25 April 1886. Forti was "a true stage child" to theater-parents. Her father Anton Johann Fiedler, born August 29, 1838, "so called Forti", was an operatic tenor in Düsseldorf who retired from singing and by the 1880s was an "academic painter" who ran a shop renting out paintings and etchings (Note: today he would be regarded as decorator perhaps; he owned a store renting out paintings and etchings for different occasions) Anton Forti died February 14, 1920. (Note: This is not the Viennese Mozart and Weber Baritone Anton Forti (1790–1859)) "Forti" appears to have been the family's stage name, and her last name in the personnel file at the Dresden court theater was like her father's, "Fiedler, so-called Forti".

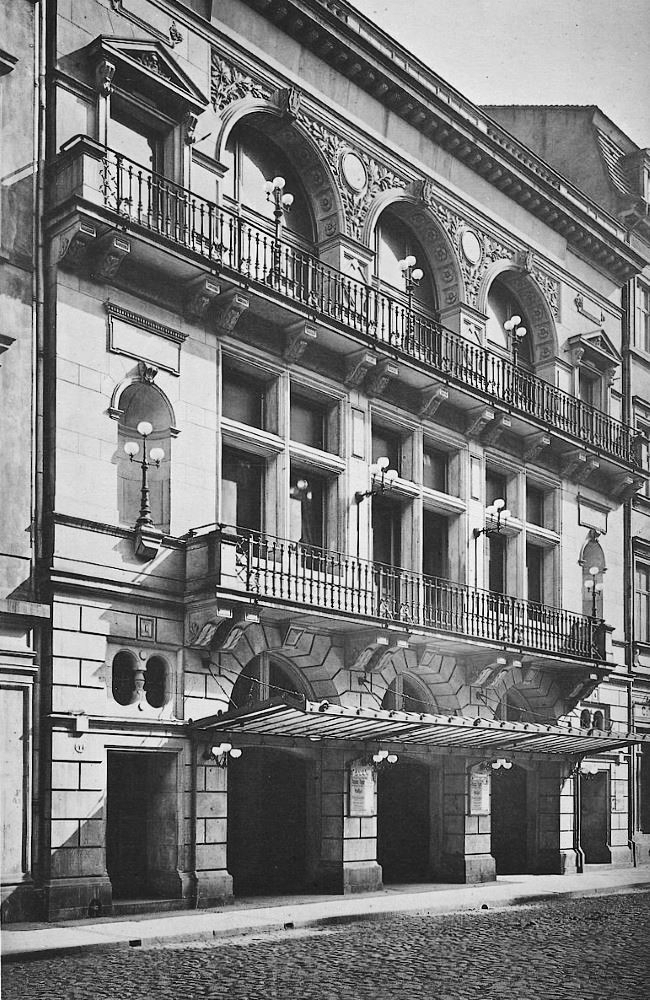
The Residenztheater where Forti would act in as a child

Her mother was the Dresden-Residenztheater actress and operetta singer, Minna Amalie Forti-Hänsel (before 1853 – c. 1925). Minna Hänsel was "one of the best soubrettes ever", according to the Die deutsche Schaubühne, and played in the "second theater" in Dresden in 1869. After the loss of Gottfried Semper's "first court opera" due to fire, her theater closed as well (it was deemed a fire hazard: the loss of Semper's court-theater prompted reevaluation in all theaters). Minna Hänsel moved to Berlin. Semper would go on to rebuild the theater to its current form, where Minna Hänsel's daughter would sing for many years. Hänsel sang the title role in Offenbach's Helena at the Imperial German Court Theater (Kaiserlich-Deutsches Hoftheater) in St. Petersburg, in 1874, becoming a well-known soubrette who sang in Chemnitz, Görlitz, Hannover, Stuttgart (summer theater in Berg), Stettin and in Dresden, later a fine comic character-actress. By 1872 the Residenz theater in Dresden was built in the Zirkusstrasse, and Hänsel became one of its main artists.

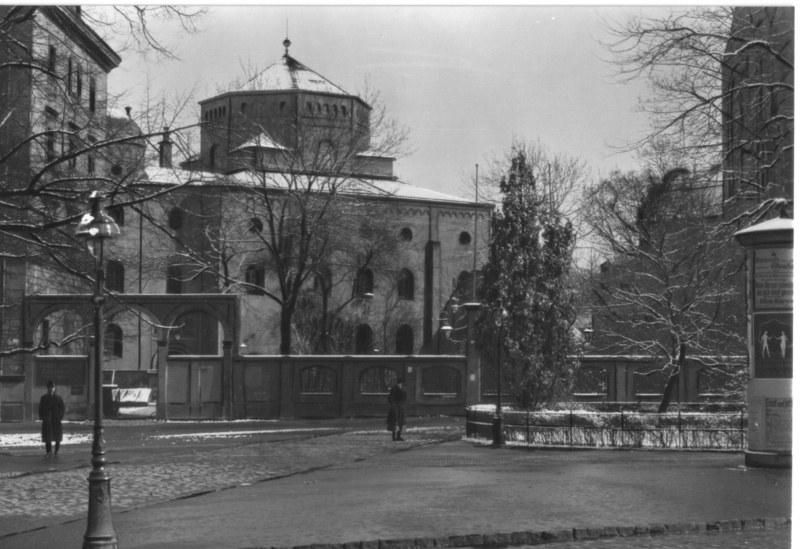
Semper's synagogue in 1910; Forti lived in the building just seen to the right, which was attached to the synagogue grounds.

The family's apartment in Dresden was in Zeughausstrasse 2, adjacent to the Synagogue (also designed by Gottfried Semper, the court opera architect). The Jewish local community had its offices in this building as well. Apart from participation in a 1916 concert in the synagogue, it is not known if Forti had any specific connection to the Jewish community or if she was Jewish – later, in 1933, her husband would be accused by the Nazi party of having a Jewish wife.

== Life ==
Already at age five, Helena appeared in children's roles at the Residenztheater in Dresden. Her professional stage debut was as an actress, at the Dessau court theater, at age sixteen in Goethe's The Brother and Sister (Die Geschwister). In Dessau she played the "Naive and Sentimental" "Fach". She also worked at the theater in Colberg.

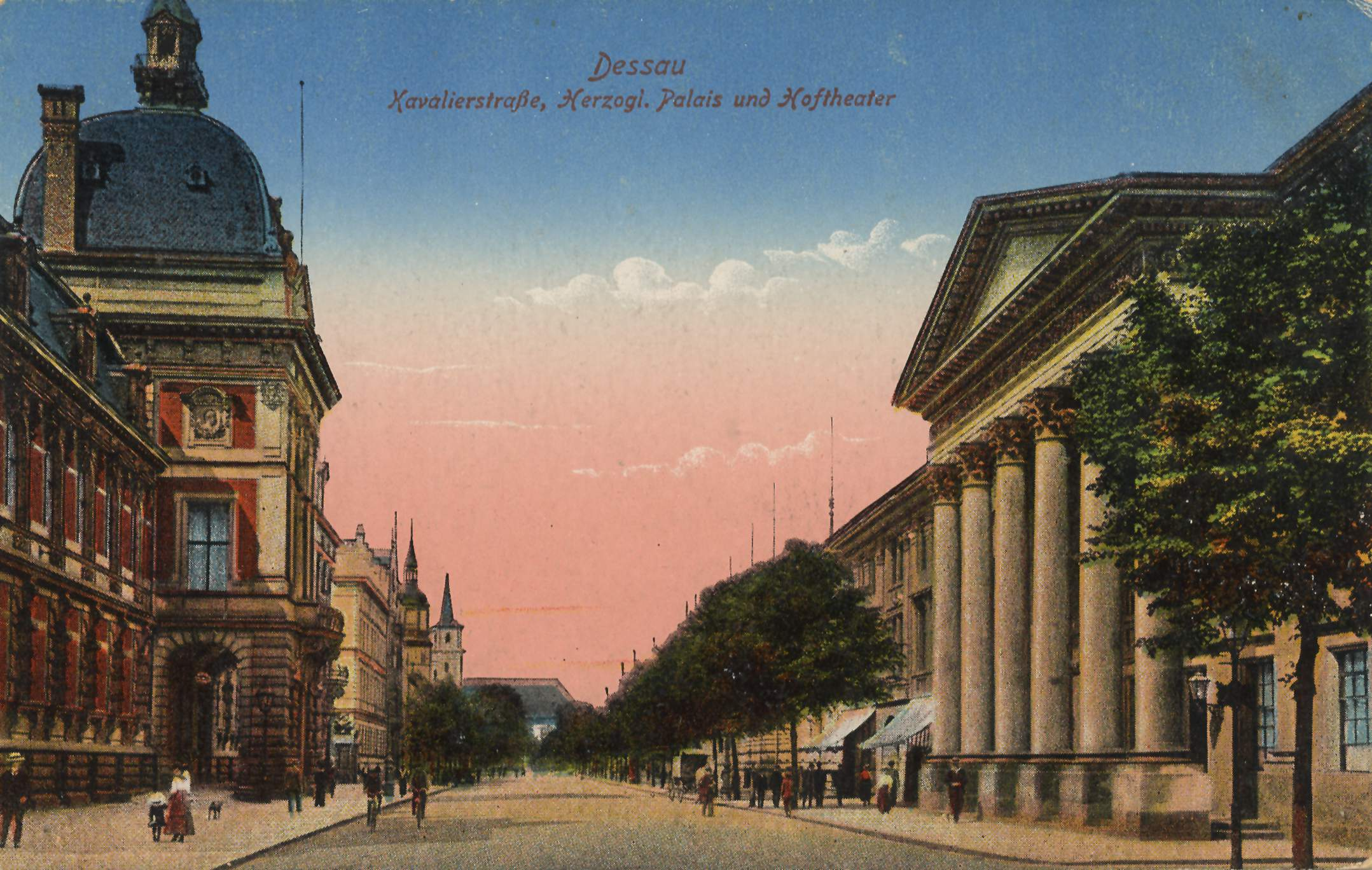
Kavalierstraße, Dessau, 1900, the court theater is on the right

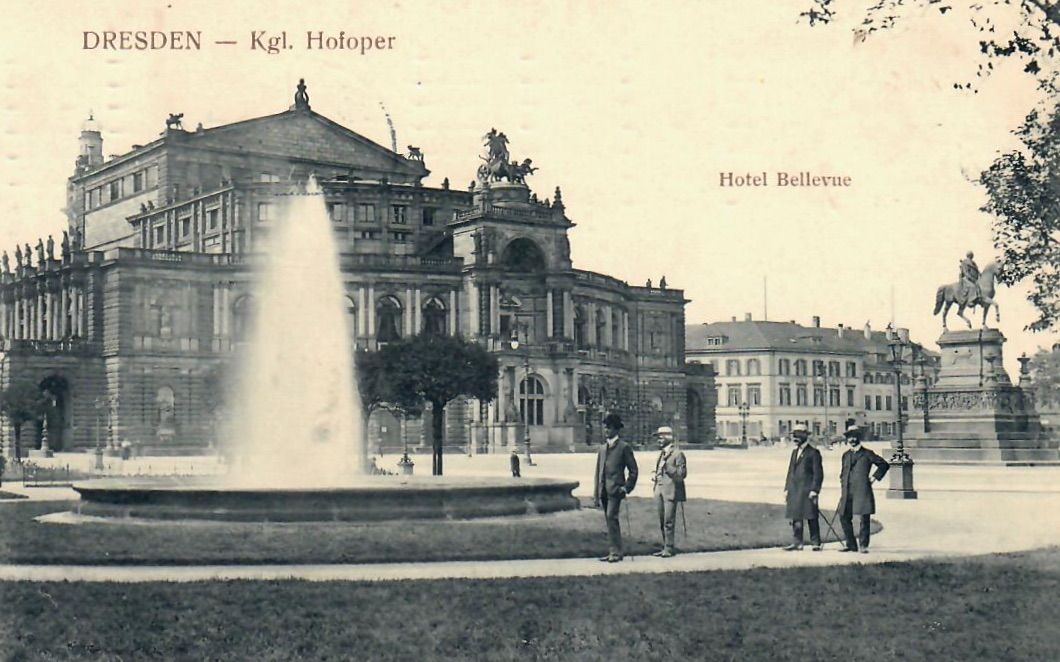
Dresden Royal court opera

In 1903 she studied singing with the Dresden baritone Karl Scheidemantel, who would become opera director in Dresden in 1920, in her final years there; Further studies were with Teresa Emmerich in Berlin. Forti's stage Debut as a soprano operatic singer came in 1906, as Valentine in Giacomo Meyerbeer's Les Huguenots at the Hoftheater Dessau, where she was a member of the soloist ensemble, staying till 1907. Numerous national and international performances followed, at the Royal opera in Stuttgart in 1907, 1908–09 at the Brno Theater, and 1910–11 in Angelo Neumann's Deutsches Theater in Prague. There she learned her first dramatic roles, and sang contemporary pieces such as Deltnar's Carmelita, and Felix Weingartner's "Orestea Trilogie". She sang as a guest in the Court Opera in Berlin (Valentine in Meyerbeer's Huguenots) in 1908, in the theaters of Bremen and Braunschweig, in Vienna (as Elisabeth in Tannhäuser) in 1910 and 1913, and at the Munich Wagner-Festival (in 1911). Her last performance in Prague was Leonora in Fidelio, Alexander von Zemlinsky conducted.

== Dresden 1911–1925 ==
The reigning Wagner prima-donnas of the court theater of Dresden were Therese Malten and her successor Marie Wittich. Stars of Dresden and Bayreuth, they made way for a new, dramatically oriented singer like Annie Krull, Strauss's choice for Diemuth (in Feuersnot) and the title role of Elektra. Yet Krull failed to achieve Wittich's star-status and left Dresden for Mannheim in 1911. Forti had first appeared in Dresden during the Esperanto Congress in 1908, and in September 1911 sang Sieglinde in Die Walküre as a guest at the Royal court opera. She was then hired as Krull's replacement in the soloist ensemble, and started her contract in Dresden on October 14, 1911. The music director, Ernst von Schuch, writing to Strauss, described Forti as "A Brunnhilde presence, with a big voice". Yet this very "Brunnhilde look" was a problem for Strauss, who warned against casting Forti as Salome, her being too "giant". Strauss, later writing to the Dresden conductor Hermann Ludwig Kutzschbach, suggester her as the Composer in Ariadne (she later sang the title role), and was happy to accept her as Herodias in Salome (1916). Forti's first role in Dresden was Elisabeth in Tannhäuser on October 25, 1911, With Elisabeth, Forti earned a "noticeable success which should be decisive for her being further cast in Wagner roles. She brings not only the vocal size, but also the necessary pathos of expression." and she remained in Dresden till 1925, her last performance that of Adriano in Wagners Rienzi.

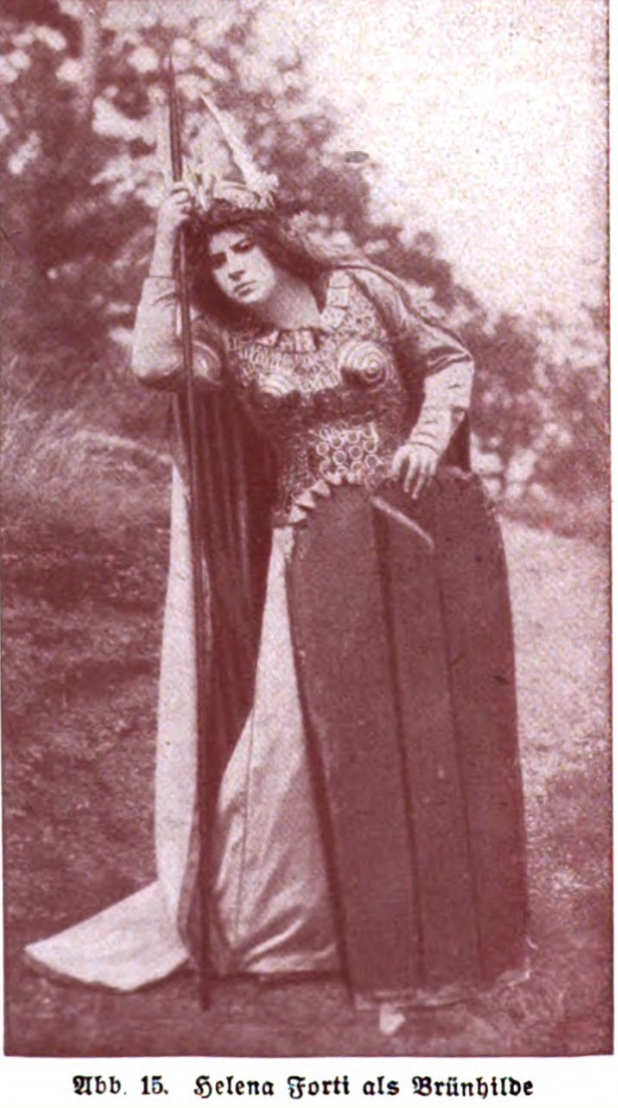
Forti as Brünnhilde in Dresden

Forti sang the title roles of Aida, Fidelio and Carmen, Marina in Boris Godunov, Santuzza in Cavalleria, Antonia in Contes d'Hoffmann, Rachel in La Juive, Leonore im Il Trovatore, Amelia in Ballo in Maschera and even Pamina in Die Zauberflöte, but mainly she was the Wagner-singer of Dresden: Senta in Der fliegende Holländer Ortrud in Lohengrin, Isolde in Tristan und Isolde, Sieglinde in Die Walküre, and all other Wagner heroines, Elsa, Eva, Brünnhilde, Fricka, etc. Forti sang more contemporary pieces as well, the title role of Ariadne auf Naxos, Minneleide in Pfitzner's Die Rose vom Liebesgarten; most notably she created the role of Myrtocle in d'Albert's opera Die toten Augen in 1916.

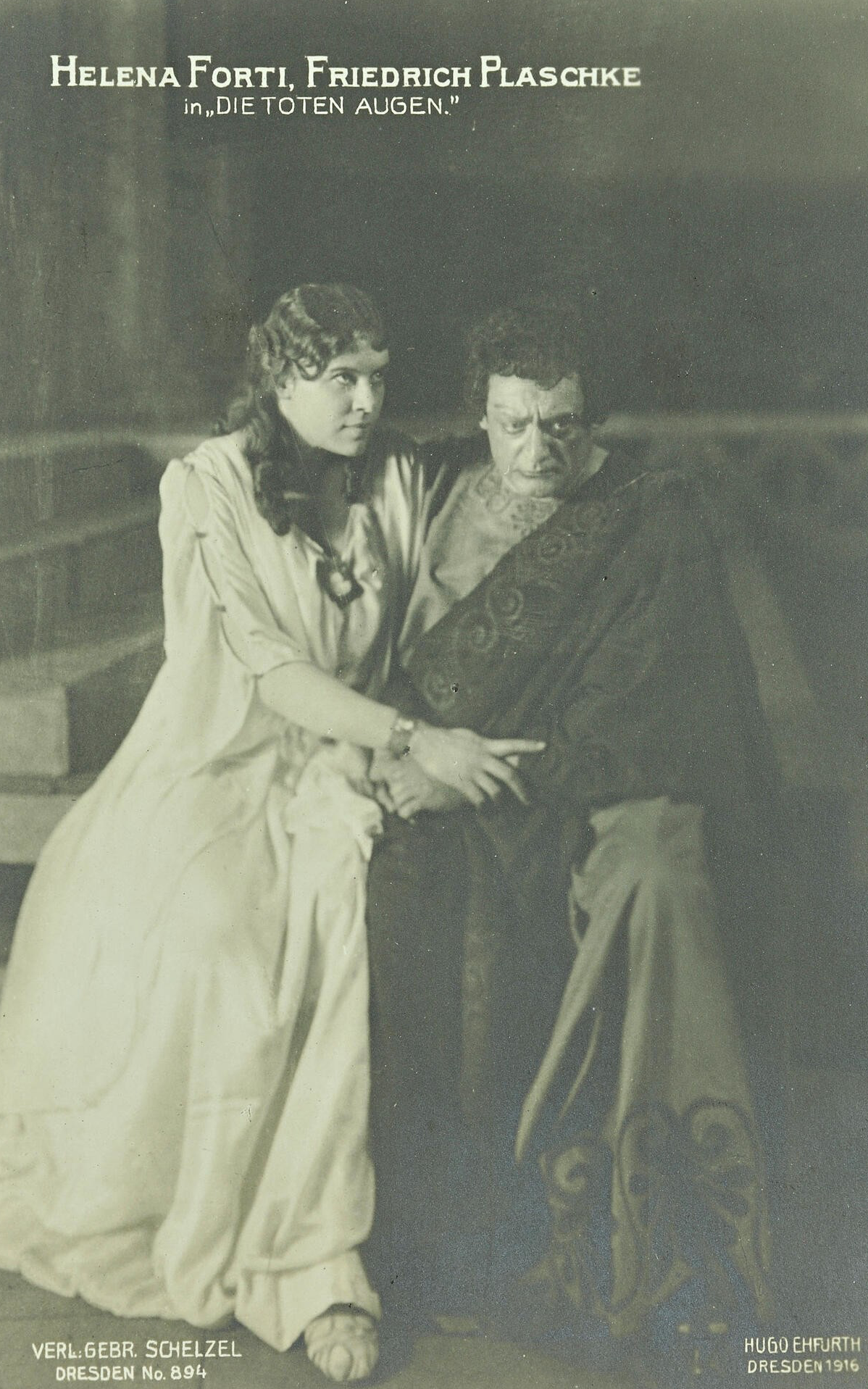
Plaschke und Forti, in Die toten Augen

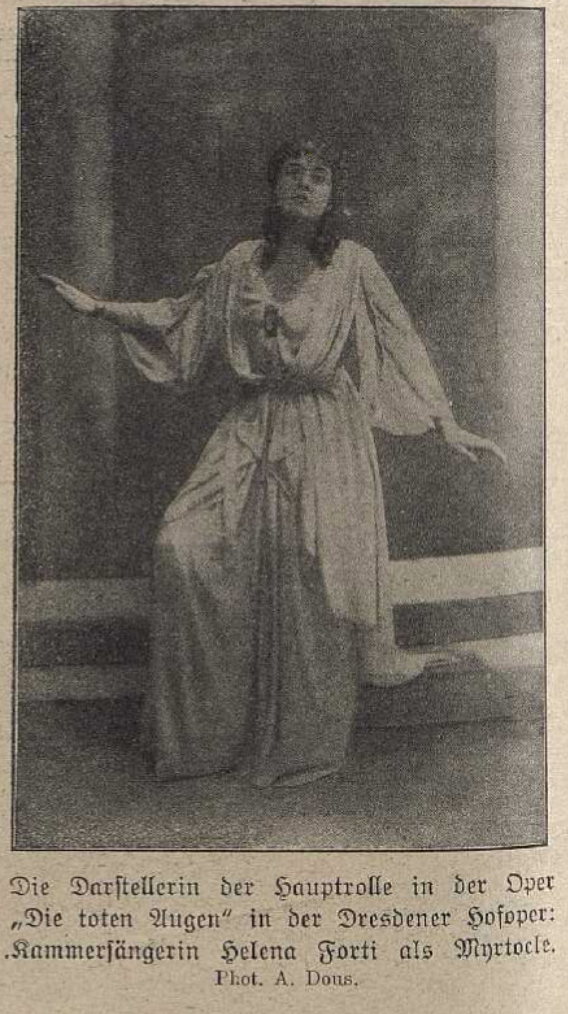
Forti as Myrtocle in Die toten Augen,

Forti's role is the most exposed, written in a late romantic idiom, high in tessitura and expansive in expression, containing music of tenderness such as Myrtocle's first monologue "Psyche wandelt durch Säulenhallen", intensely dramatic sections such as "Doch! Doch! Doch!", and the final duett with Arcesius (sung by Friedrich Plaschke) which closes the opera. The opera proved a great success for the conductor Fritz Reiner and Forti, it was played often, but did not enter into the canon of standard repertoire, the music and biblical theme of controversial quality.

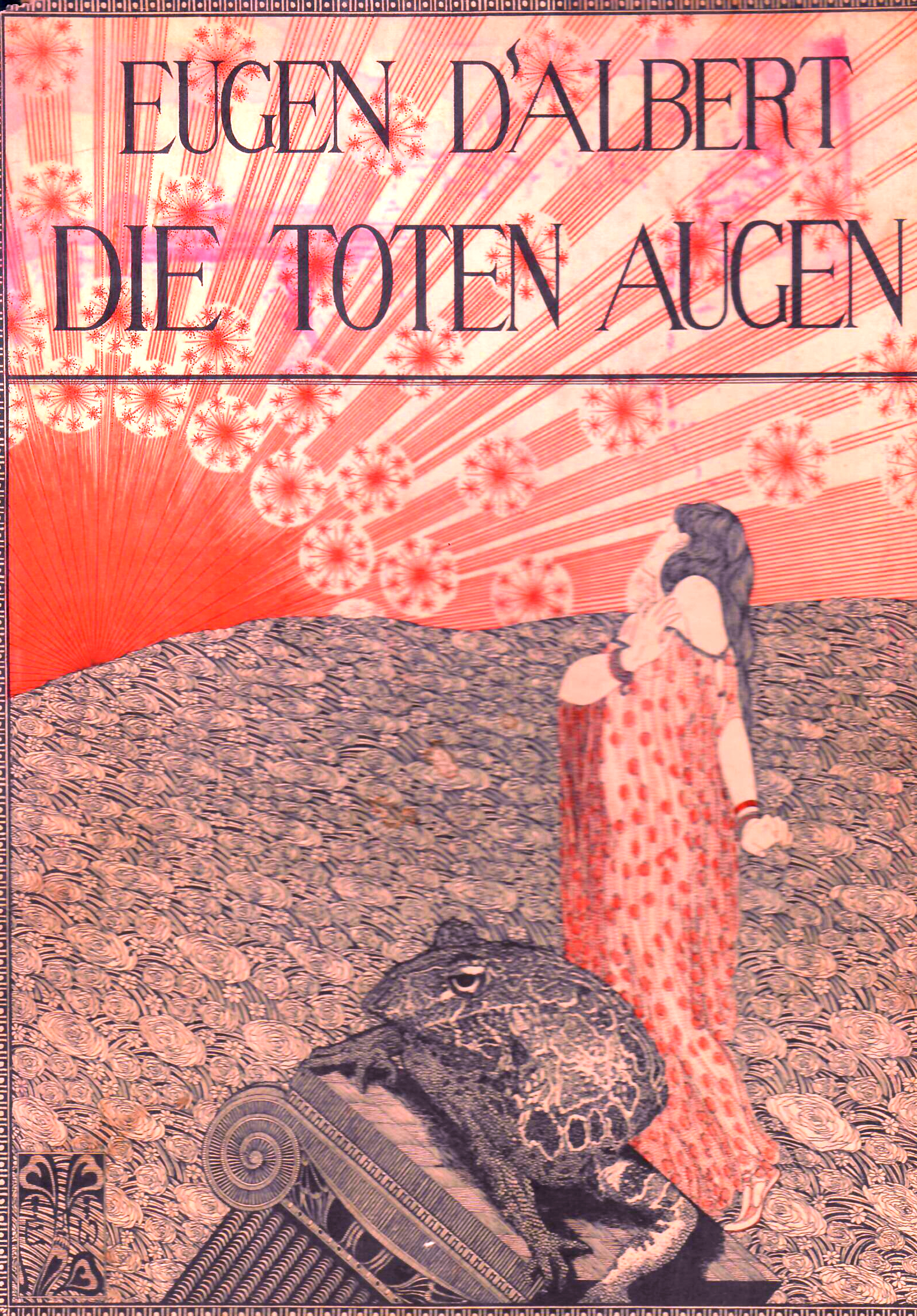
Book cover of Die Toten Augen

Other role creations were Maria in Arthur Wulffius's opera Gabina (1914), Eroon in Karl v. Kaskel's Schmiedein von Kent, (1916) Ilsebil in Naumann's opera Mantje timpe te, (1918), and Irene in Siegfried Wagner's Sonnenflammen, (1920). The opera was a success with the audience, due to Forti's excellent performance. Forti also sang Dresden's first performances of Erich Wolfgang Korngold's Marietta in Die Tote Stadt and the title role in his Violanta, as well as the role of Weibes (=a woman) in Paul Hindemith's opera, Mörder Hoffnung der Frauen

During her Dresden period she sang in Amsterdam, Berlin (the world premiere of Alfred Kaise]'s Stella Maris), Brussels, Bucharest, Cologne, Dessau (Isolde) Munich, Vienna, Zürich (Boris Godunov), and in Italy. She appeared in the concerts of the summer season of 1920 in Toeplitz Schonau.

In 1914 Forti appeared for her only season at the Bayreuth Festival as Sieglinde in Die Walküre and Kundry in Parsifal. Bühne und Welt wrote: "It was an event. No stage should have two such powerful Kundry-interpreters at the same time. Forti drew from the depths of all femininity, and was – in her internalization, and lightly consuming ecstasy, of indescribable urgency. One experienced the mystery of compassion."

Forti received the title of Kammersängerin in 1917. At the time of her death, Forti had two such titles, the one granted by the King in Dresden in 1917 ("Kgl. sächsische Kammersängerin"), it is unknown when and where she was granted the other title, "fürstlich-preußische Kammersängerin". . (Note: either from the Dessau or Gera theaters)

== Marriage to W.B. Iltz ==
in 1917, she married Dresden's "most famous and excellent" actor Walter Bruno Iltz, who was "always seen sitting in the artist's box when Forti sang, utterly immersed at her stage presence." Iltz (1886–1965), was an actor in the Dresden Schauspiel, a stage-director and later general-director of the Reussisches Theater in Gera, (1924-19279), Düsseldorf Schauspiel (1927–1937), Volkstheater in Vienna (1938–1944), and after the war, the Nürnberg, Braunschweig and Düsseldorf theaters. The wedding took place in Tegernsee, Bavaria, where they purchased a house from Forti's tenor-colleague Leo Slezak. In Dresden the couple lived in Forti's parent's apartment in Zeughausstraße 2. The Dresden artist Georg Gelbke designed the couple's wedding announcement, as well as stationary for her, based on a motif from Walküre. The Forti-Iltz couple were an important part of the Dresden artistic society, and were friends of Siegfried and Winifred Wagner, Paul Adolph (administrative director of the Dresden Theater), the Austrian-German literary scholar Oskar Walzel, (Note: Walzel: (Walzel, Oskar F. (Oskar Franz), 1864–1944))Karl Mai, the German author Max Mohr, and others. The artist Rudolf Scheffler included them in his book of caricatures of the most famous members of the royal court theater in Dresden.

== Retirement from the stage ==
Forti's contract in Dresden Opera ended in 1925, her performances in Dresden and elsewhere dwindled. Online and other references (e.g. Kutsch – Riemens Sängerlexikon) to a "career breakthrough" in Germany after her "excellent" Marina in Boris Godunov in 1923 cannot be sourced and are in error; Forti definitely retired from singing by 1925. Years of singing the dramatic repertoire and a possible addiction to morphium may have taken their toll. Siegfried Wagner wrote her a flattering letter, expressing regret at her early retirement from the stage.

== Later life ==
Forti's mother Minna died about 1925. Forti and her husband left the apartment in Zeughausstrasse 2 (it was taken over by Kurt Striegler, the Dresden Kapellmeister). She followed her husband to Gera where he was Intendant and where she worked with the actors of his company. According to Theo Anna Sprüngli, Forti now "saw her own success in the success of her husband, her highest ambition was to see him achieving his plans". In Gera, Iltz's production of the 1925 play Katalaunische Schlacht by Arnolt Bronnen – a sexualized war drama offended public sensibilities, and Iltz, as well as his wife received an anonymous letter with threat of being shot. In 1929 Forti followed Iltz to Düsseldforf, where he was named general director, and where she also continued to coach actors, and teach singing to (female) opera singers.

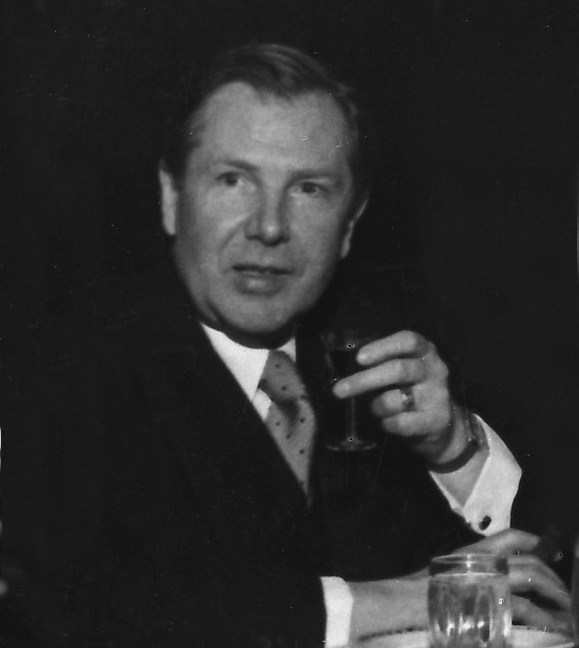
Walter Bruno Iltz 1938

The couple moved to Vienna, when Iltz became director of the Volksoper there. Forti died in Vienna, on the 11th of May, 1942, 58 years old, "after a long, severe nervous disorder triggered by her husband's clashes with the Nazi press and the Nazi party in Düsseldorf, which for many years had been "incomprehensible and agonizing" to her and her husband's existence". She was buried in Tegernsee.

== Critical appreciation ==
There are no films or Video documents of Forti's artistry. She earned her place in the history of modern opera following the footsteps of singing actresses like Annie Krull. Bühnen und Welt of 1909 describes the young Forti in the Prag Maifestspiele as a "youthful singer with great sensuous charm and excellent vocal, acting and intellectual qualities". Upon her farewell from Dresden, the Neue Zeitschrift für Musik summed her up as a „singing actress" who was "for more than ten years an 'artistic personality'", one who "unified acting and singing", The author Oskar Walzel (Note: Oskar Franz Walzel, 1864–1944, Austrian-German writer and literary scholar, a professor in Dresden (during Forti's years there)) describes her Slavonic features, yet "on stage one could not imagine a more convincing personification of a Wagner heroine. Tall and slim, with reddish hair, she commanded gesture masterfully. Upon entering the stage as a Walkyrie, one says to one's self, this, and in no other way, should a Brünnhilde look like... Yet Walzel and others also comments that Forti's vocal material and craftsmanship did not match her visual qualities, Forti was "no replacement for Marie Wittich". ibid, As early as 1911, Die Musik, while praising her Senta in Der fliegende Holländer, notes a certain difficulty in the top range of her voice. Her first attempt at the role of Kundry was "scenically quite impressive" but vocally insufficient; Her Isolde "looked better than it was sung", By the end, Der Merker, merely labels her last performance (Adriano in Rienzi) as "disappointing".

Theo A Sprüngli, the critic and activist wrote:

"An almost mystical magic, the magic of glowing life, emanated from her when she was on stage. She was always on fire inside, she always had to burn herself out; the fire of her enthusiasm, kindled by the primal-power of her heart, was never extinguished. Forti's innermost being was a rushing melody, her art a return of the heart to its divine origin: divine love."

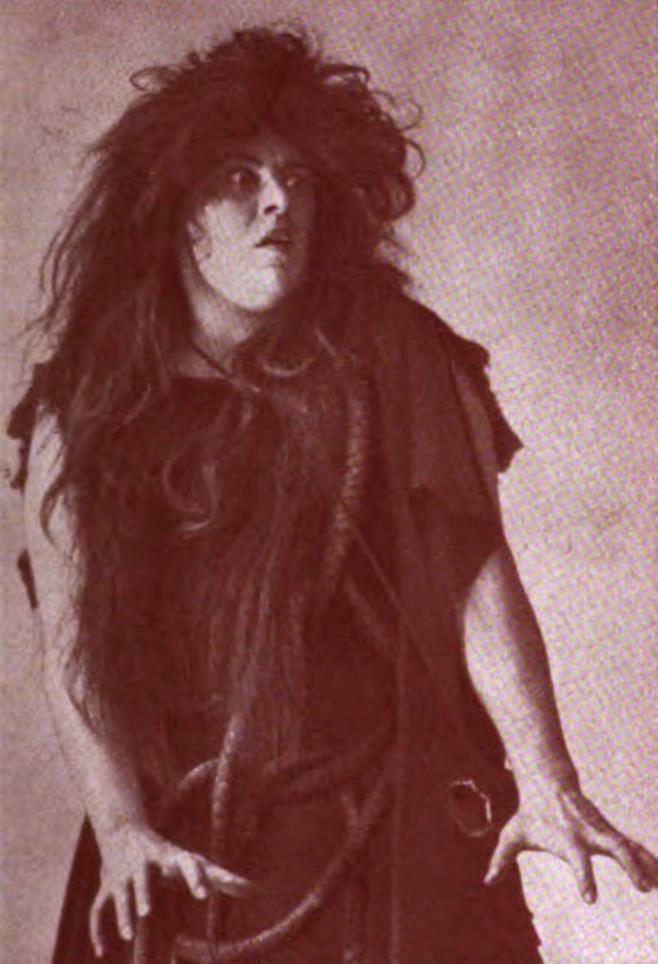
Forti as Kundry

== Recordings ==
- Brahms, song: Vergebliches Ständchen, 1920, Odeon
- Gounod, Faust, aria: Jewel song, Zonophone
- Rotoli, song: La Serenata, Zonophone
- Wagner, Rinezi, aria: „in seiner Blüte“, 1920 odeon
- Wagner, Parsifal, "Grausamer! Fühlst Du im Herzen
- Leoncavallo, song: Mattinata, 1920, Odeon

== Repertoire ==
Sources:

- Hochmuth: Chronicles of the Dresden opera (in German)
- German Bühnenjahrbuch, (yearbook of theater activity) from 1943 (with an article about Forti listing her roles).
- Dresden SLUB library, Musiconn, Repertoire list for Helena Forti
- Other sources noted specifically

Composer – Role – Opera title – note (if any)

- d'Albert, Marion Liebesketten
- d'Albert, Marta, Tiefland
- d'Albert, Myrtocle‚ Die toten Augen, Role creation, Dresden
- Aubert, Muette, Muette de Portici
- Beethoven, Leonore, Fidelio
- Bizet, Michaela, Carmen
- Deltnar, Carmelita, Carmelita, Role creation, Prague,
- Goetz, Katharina Wiederspenstigen Zähmung
- Halevy, Rachel, La Juive
- Hindemith, Frau, Mörder Hoffnung der Frauen
- Kaiser, Marga, Stella Maris
- Kaskel, Eroon, Schmiedin von Kent, Role creation, Dresden
- Korngold, Marietta‚ die tote Stadt
- Leoncavallo, Nedda, Pagliacci
- Mascagni, Santuzza, Cavalleria
- Meyerbeer, Valentine, Die Hugenotten
- Meyerbeer, Selika, Die Afrikanerin
- Mozart, Pamina, Die Zauberflöte
- Mussorgsky, Marina, Boris Godunow
- Naumann, Ilsebill‚ Mantje Timpe Te, Role creation, Dresden
- Offenbach, Antonia, Tales of Hoffmann
- Pfitzner, Minneleide, Die Rose vom Liebesgarten
- Strauss, Ariadne, Ariadne auf Naxos
- Verdi, Aida‚ Aida
- Verdi, Amelia, Un Ballo in Maschera
- Verdi, Leonora, Il Trovatore
- Wagner, Siegfrid, Irene, Sonnenflammen, Role creation, Dresden
- Wagner, Elisabeth, Tannhäuser
- Wagner, Elsa, Lohengrin
- Wagner, Senta, Der Fliegende Holländer
- Wagner, Brünnhilde, Die Walküre
- Wagner, Brünnhilde, Götterdämmerung
- Wagner, Kundry, Parsifal
- Wagner, Adriano Rienzi
- Wagner, Sieglinde, Die Walküre
- Wagner, Isolde, Tristan und Isolde
- Wagner, Venus, Tannhäuser
- Wagner, Eva, Meistersinger
- Wagner, Fricke, Das Rheingold
- Wagner, Ortrud, Lohengrin
- Waltershausen, Rosine, Oberst Chabert
- Weingertner, Kassandra, Orestes Trilogie, Role creation, Prague

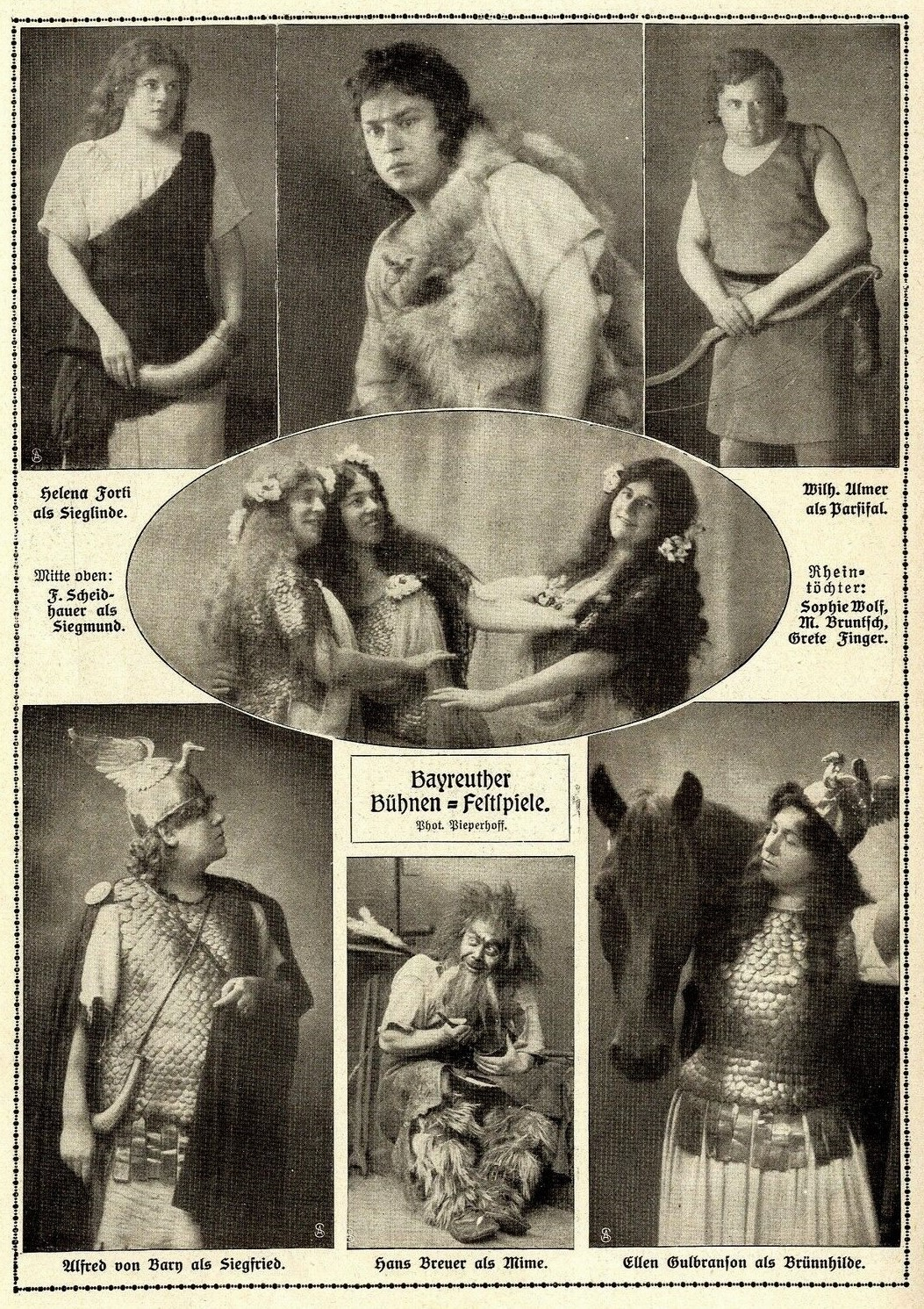
Bayreuther Bühnen-Festspiele, 1914 – Alfred Pieperhoff

== Literature (selected) ==
English:

- Calico, Joy, Staging Scandal with Salome and Elektra

German:

- Detken & Schonau, Rollenfach und Drama
- Hanke Krauss, Gabrielle, Richard Strauss Ernst von Schuch, ein Briefwechsel
- Hochmuth, Michael, Chronik der Dresdner Oper – Zahlen, Namen, Ereignisse
- Kugel, Wilfried, Der Unverantwortliche : das Leben des Hanns Heiz Ewers
- Manker, Paulus, Enttarnung eines Helden: Das unbekannte Leben des Walter Bruno Iltz
- Mühsam, Paul, Ich bin ein Mensch gewesen, Lebenserinnerungen
- Stahl, Ernst Leopold, Das Mannheimer Nationaltheater, ein Jahrhundert deutscher Theaterkultur im Reich
- Schäffler, Rudolf, HUKA ALBUM
- Walzel, Oskar, Wachstum und Wandel

German Periodicals from the beginning of the 20th Century:

- Berliner Illustrirter Zeitung
- Bühne und Welt
- Die Musik
- Die Stimme: Centralblatt für Stimm- und Tonbildung, Gesangunterricht und Stimmhygiene
- Menschen, Monatsschrift für neue Kunst. volumes 3–5 1920–22
- Neue Zeitschrift für Musik
- Neue Musik Zeitung
- Signale für die musikalische Welt
