= Die Bürgschaft (opera) =

Opera by Kurt Weill

- Opera by Kurt Weill
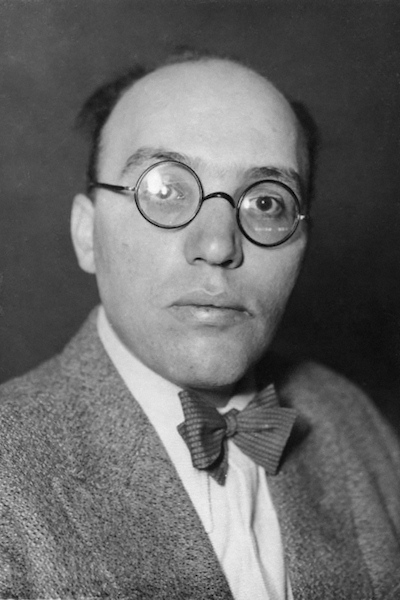
- The composer in 1932
- Translation: The Pledge
- Librettist: Caspar Neher
- Language: German
- Based on: Der afrikanische Rechtspruch by Johann Gottfried Herder
- Premiere: 10 March 1932; Städtische Oper, Berlin

Die Bürgschaft (The Pledge, or suretyship) is an opera in three acts by Kurt Weill. Caspar Neher wrote the German libretto after the parable Der afrikanische Rechtspruch (The African Verdict) by Johann Gottfried Herder. Composed from August to October 1931, it was premiered on 10 March 1932 at the Städtische Oper in Berlin, Germany.

== Intent ==
The opera dates from the years immediately prior to Weill's emigration to the United States. Representing "the summation of Weill's career as an opera composer in Europe," it provides insight into the compositional path that Weill might have followed had he stayed in Europe. Die Bürgschaft is an opera of broad ambition and scope, far more somber in tone than Weill's prior works for the stage. The work is in part the result of Weill's growing distance from Brecht during work on Rise and Fall of the City of Mahagonny, leading the composer to turn to stage designer Caspar Neher, his longtime collaborator as a stage director, for the libretto. Die Bürgschaft is, further, a product of its political climate, dubbed by Weill an opera that "attempts to adopt a position on matters that concern us all," and one of many Weill stage works of this period "addressing the problem of moral responsibility within a crumbling culture given over to greed, power, and inhumanity." As Weill wrote in reaction to a review of the opera's premiere, "the job of opera today consists in reaching out beyond the fate of private individuals towards universality." In addition to its sobriety and political undertones, Die Bürgschaft is a musical turning point for Weill. Weill characterized it as "a return to real music-making." Scholars have noted its departure from the "number opera" formula of works such as The Threepenny Opera and Rise and Fall of the City of Mahagonny in exchange for a more continuous sound, as well as a minimizing of satire and irony. Certain of these scholars have also noted influences ranging from Handel and Verdi in its oratorio-like features to a detached and unemotional character indebted to Stravinsky's Oedipus Rex.

Die Bürgschaft concerns the rise to power of a money-driven dictatorship, bringing with it greed and destruction. The plot bears clear parallels with the rise of Nazism in Germany at the time, but as suggested above it also acts as a larger social parable dealing with man's role in society. Indeed, the source for Herder's tale Der afrikanische Rechtspruch, on which Neher's libretto was based, is the "Bava Metzia" section of the Talmud. Interpreted accordingly, the social parable of Die Bürgschaft is the covenant of rabbinical teaching: the bonds between men, between men and their community, and between forces within the community of men such as the law, the state, and the government.

== Performance history ==
After its Berlin premiere on 10 March 1932 (directed by Carl Ebert), Die Bürgschaft was produced in two additional German cities in 1932, Wiesbaden and Düsseldorf (12 April 1932; directed by Walter Bruno Iltz, conductor: Jascha Horenstein), before political events led to its removal from the German stage. After two radio revivals of heavily edited, if not mutilated, versions of the opera in 1957 and 1980, respectively, the original version was performed with the Vrije Universiteit Amsterdam choir and conducted by Jean-Marie ten Velden in February 1987 in the Paradiso concert hall, Amsterdam; and by the Bielefeld Opera conducted by Rainer Koch and Geoffrey Moull in 1998. One German critic noted of the Bielefeld production that "all the intendants of Germany's top-ranking opera houses should be required to attend a performance." Soon after, the original version received its American premiere, and first recording, at the 1999 Spoleto Festival USA in Charleston, South Carolina, under Julius Rudel. Music critic for The Wall Street Journal, Heidi Waleson, wrote of the opera, in a review the Spoleto Festival production, that Die Bürgschaft is "a stunning work that knits together Weill's intense social and political concerns with compositional skill and invention of the highest order." In a performance at the Kurt Weill Festival in Dessau in 2002, Golo Berg conducted the Anhaltische Philharmonie.

== Roles ==
Roles, voice types, premiere cast
Role	Voice type	Premiere cast, 10 March 1932 Conductor: Fritz Stiedry
Johann Mattes, a cattle dealer in the town of Urb	baritone	Hans Reinmar
Anna Mattes, Johann's wife	mezzo-soprano	Lotte Lenya
David Orth, a grain dealer in the town of Urb	bass	Wilhelm Rode
Jakob Orth, David's son	tenor	Henk Noort
Luise Mattes, Johann & Anna's daughter	soprano	Irene Eisinger
The judge of Urb	tenor	Bjørn Talén
The town crier	tenor	
Ellis, the commissar	tenor	
Gang of three creditors/highwaymen/blackmailers/agents	tenor, baritone, bass	
Alto solo	alto	

== Recordings ==
- 2000: First complete recording: Julius Rudel, Spoleto Festival Orchestra, with Ann Panagulias (soprano), Margaret Thompson (mezzo-soprano), Katherine Ciesinski (alto), Joel Sorensen (tenor), Frederick Burchinal (baritone), Dale Travis (bass), The Westminster Choir
