= Altes Theater (Düsseldorf) =

Coordinates: 51°13′33″N 6°46′18″E

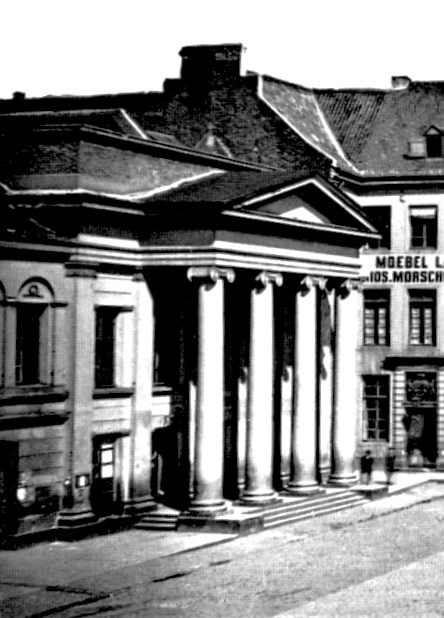
The theatre in the early 1830s

Altes Theater was a theatre in Düsseldorf, North Rhine-Westphalia, Germany. It operated between 1747 and the early 1870s, when it was replaced by the Stadttheater Düsseldorf.

== History ==
The Altes (Old) Theatre was also known as the Grupellotheater. The name Grupellotheater recalls that the building was the former casting house of the Baroque sculptor Gabriel de Grupello. He had also cast the Jan Wellem equestrian statue here.

The old theatre house was used as a theatre as early as 1747, when Elector Karl Theodor was staying in Düsseldorf. Around 1750 it was in operation as a comedy house. From 1751 onwards, regular theatre performances were given in the house. In 1781, art-loving citizens called on Karl Theodor to improve the Foundry House. A princely commissioner improved the building, new decorations were created at the expense of the Elector.

In 1805, the theatre was transformed into a "Bergische Nationalbühne" or "Bergische Deutsches Theater". After Düsseldorf became Prussian, King Frederick William III donated the building, which had previously been state property, to the city of Düsseldorf on 11 April 1818, which henceforth leased it for theatre purposes. The first tenant was the Austrian actor and theatre director Joseph Derossi. The seven-year-old Constanze Le Gaye celebrated her debut here. The young Albert Lortzing and Rosina Regina Ahles also belonged to Derossi's ensemble.

From 1829 onwards, the playwright Karl Immermann was active here and between 1831 and 1836, he cooperated here with Christian Dietrich Grabbe. In 1834, Immermann's ensemble included Felix Mendelssohn Bartholdy and Julius Rietz as conductors, a rendant, a theatre doctor, ten men as technical staff, 20 actors and 11 actresses, nine singers and three female singers, ten male choristers and seven female choristers.

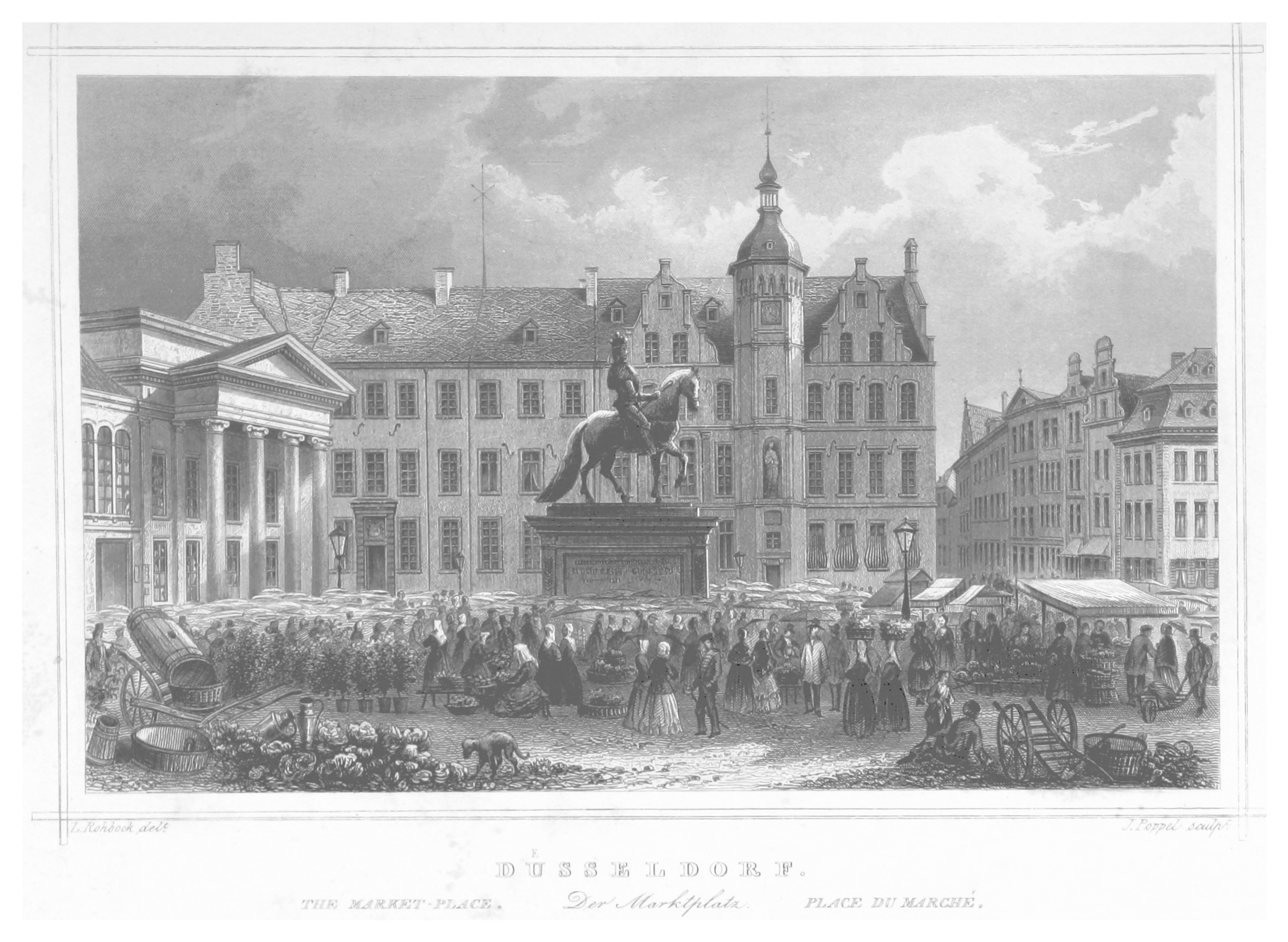
The Marktplatz and theatre in 1852

The government building consultants Vagedes and Götz submitted plans to build a new theatre building. The plans were rejected and it was decided to rebuild the Old Theatre. In 1831, the corresponding work was carried out on the old casting house. The construction costs amounted to 20,000 Taler. Finally, in 1832, a classicist portico with a tympanum on four Ionic columns was placed in front of the main façade according to a design by Anton Schnitzler, a student of Vagedes. Today, the entrance to the Council Hall of the City of Düsseldorf is located in this area.

The playhouse on the market square was finally replaced by a new municipal theatre, the Stadttheater Düsseldorf, completed in 1875.
