= Heidelberger Schlossfestspiele =

German theatre festival

Coordinates: 49°24′36″N 8°42′58″E

Heidelberger Schlossfestspiele is a theatre festival in Germany. The Heidelberger Schlossfestspiele are the best-known and most-attended open-air theater plays in Northern Baden Region. Every summer festival take place in the inner courtyard or in other areas of the Heidelberg Palace.

== Organization ==
The Heidelberg Castle Festival is organized by the Theater & Orchester Heidelberg. The artistic director there is also the festival director. Guest performances were also integrated in the pre-war period, but today the festival management consciously relies on exclusively "in-house" productions.

The 2020 Schlossfestspiele had to be cancelled due to the COVID-19 pandemic. In the Corona summer of 2021, more than 20,000 visitors came to the Heidelberg Schlossfestspiele despite the reduced number of seats. In 2022, a record number of almost 41,000 visitors were even reached. This was made possible by the opening of a fourth venue in the gardens of Heidelberg Castle, the Sonnendeck on the Bäderterrasse. Here, performance opportunities were created for local groups from the independent scene. In 2022, artists from Ukraine also performed here. A format with ensembles' own productions also met with a consistently positive response.
