= Salzburger Straßentheater =

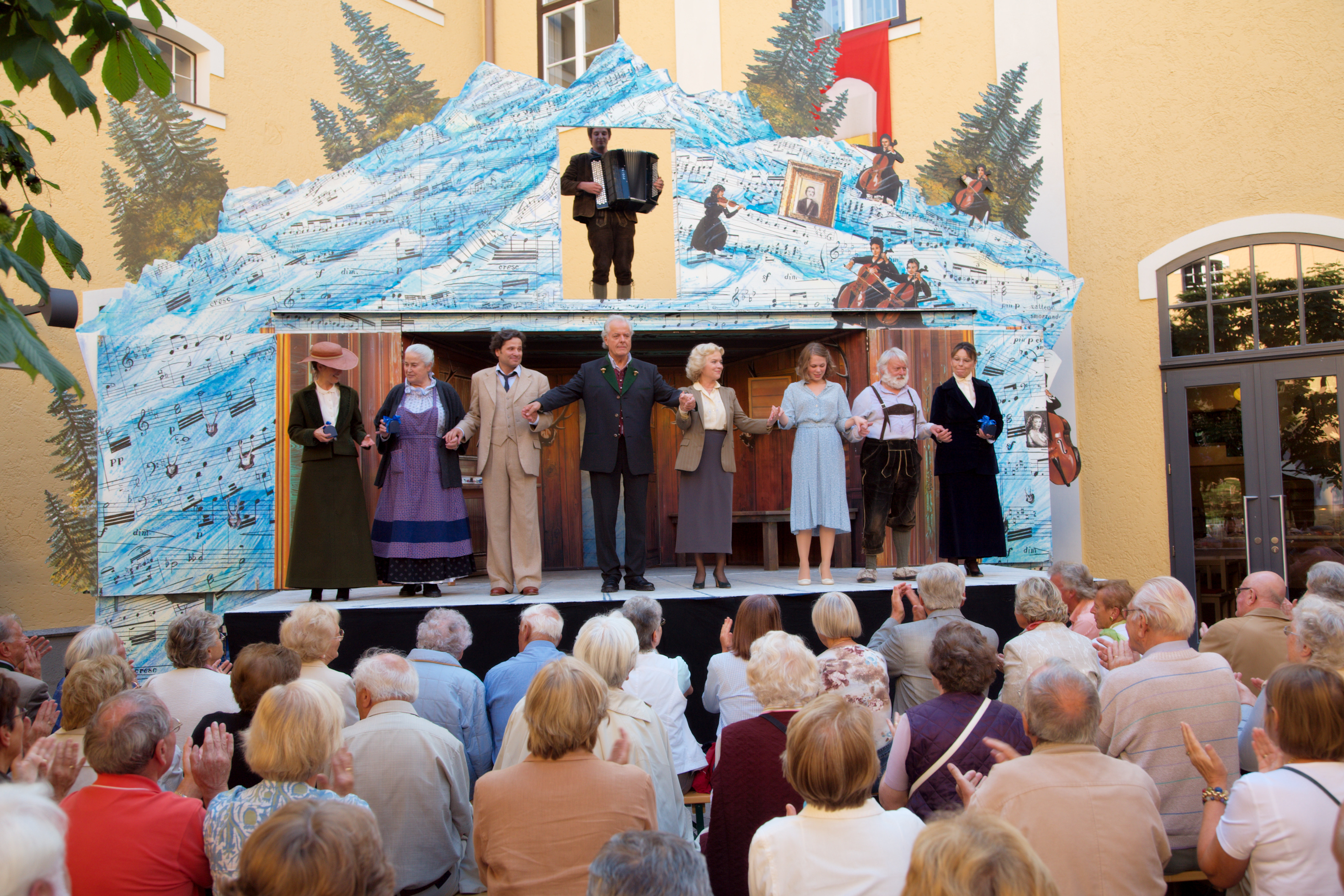
Salzburger Straßentheater, 2008

Salzburger Straßentheater is a theatre in Salzburg, Austria.
