= Le retour de l'enfant prodigue =

1907 short story by André Gide

"Le retour de l'enfant prodigue" (transl. The Return of the Prodigal Son) is a short story by André Gide. Gide wrote the story in early 1907.

It is based on the Biblical parable of the prodigal son. The story begins with the prodigal son returning home, not repentant, but hungry, poor, and frustrated at having failed to achieve his goal. He engages in dialogues with his father, mother, and elder brother. In Gide's version of the parable, the prodigal has a younger brother, who admires what his older brother accomplished but cannot understand why he returned. He is on the verge of also leaving home. This younger brother asks the returned prodigal to join him before night is over and head back out on the road: the prodigal son refuses saying he must stay home to console their mother.

The story draws upon Gide's own life experiences, and his struggles with his Protestant upbringing. In Wallace Fowlie's words, "Gide is persistently asking the question whether the Law is suitable for all men".

The story has also been adapted for the stage and performed in Paris, where incidental music for it was written by Henri Sauguet in 1933.
