= Altes Schauspielhausgebäude Düsseldorf =

Former theatre in Düsseldorf, Germany, destroyed in World War II

Coordinates: 51°13′12″N 6°46′33″E

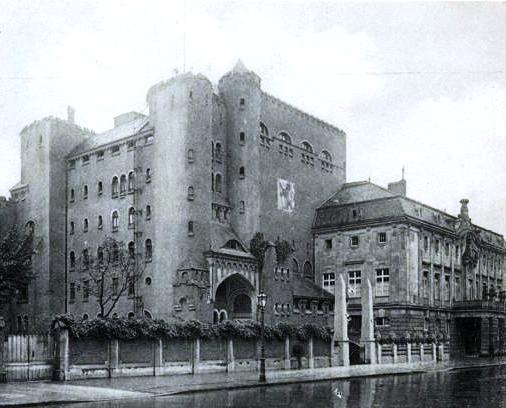
An image of Altes Schauspielhausgebäude Düsseldorf

Altes Schauspielhausgebäude Düsseldorf is a theatre in Düsseldorf, North Rhine-Westphalia, Germany, founded on June 16, 1904.
