= Dorothea Neff =

Austrian actress

Dorothea Neff (21 February 1903 – 27 July 1986) was a Vienna stage actress during the 1930s. Neff helped hide her Jewish friend Lilli Wolff, after she received resettlement orders from the Nazis to leave Vienna. To confuse the Gestapo, Neff wrote a suicide note and signed it 'Lilli' and left it in her apartment. Neff allowed Lilli to live with her for a short time and later Lilli moved in with Mati Driessen and Meta Schmidt. Driessen and Schmidt were honored in Yad Vashem in Israel as Righteous Among the Nations. She later moved from the stage to the cinema, acting up until her death in 1986.

In 1979, Dorothea Neff was awarded to the list of Righteous Among the Nations by Yad Vashem in recognition of the risk to her own life, in hiding a Jew during the Holocaust. Since 1967 to her death, Neff was blind, but still worked as an actress.

== Selected filmography ==
- The Singing House (1948)
- Adventure in Vienna (1952)
- I'm Marrying the Director (1960)
