= Stadttheater Düsseldorf =

Coordinates: 51.227353°N 6.777277°E

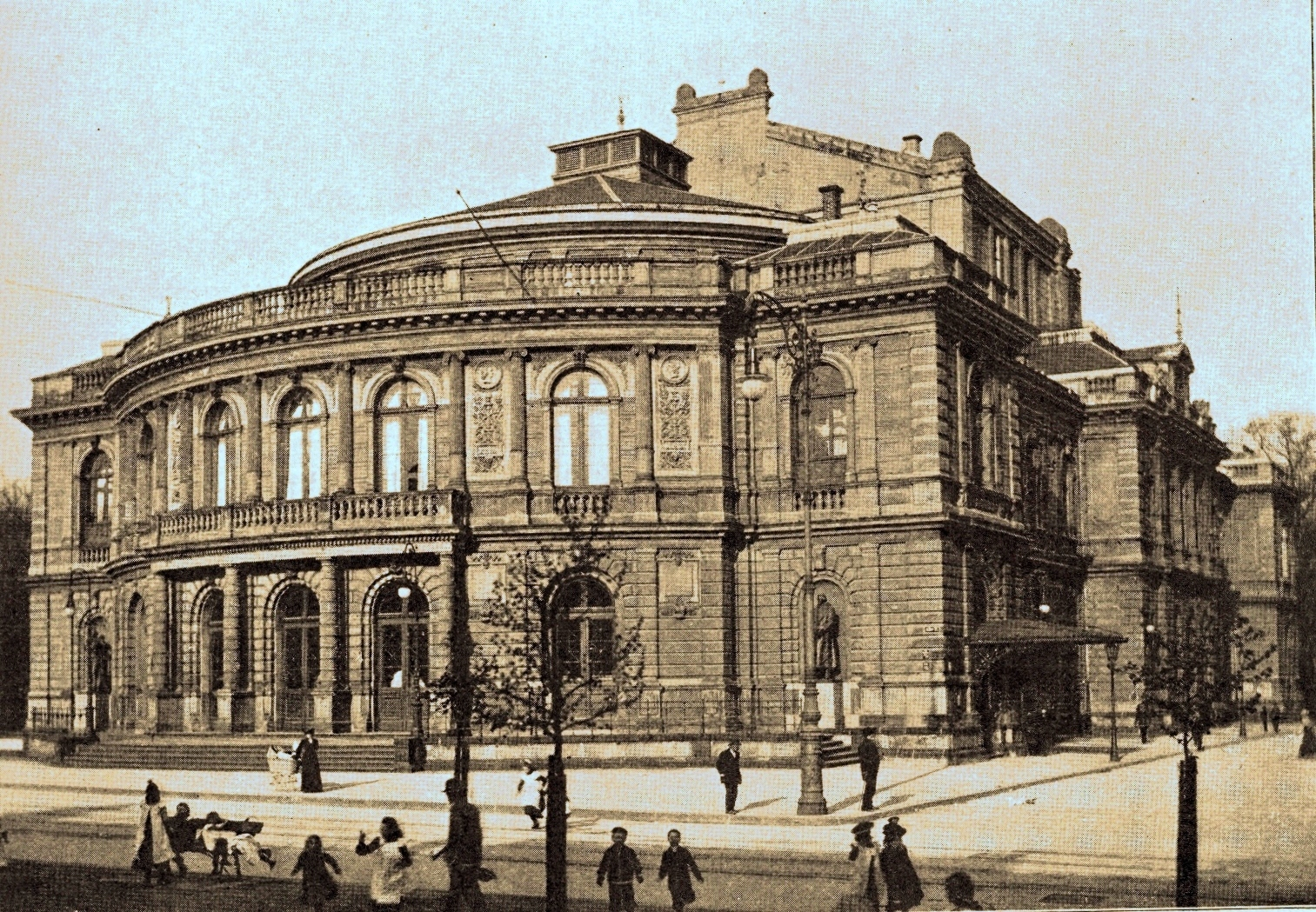

Stadttheater Düsseldorf , later Städtische Bühnen Düsseldorf,was a theatre in Düsseldorf, North Rhine-Westphalia, Germany. Designed by Ernst Giese, it was constructed between 1873 and 1875.

== History ==
On the site before the construction of the current theatre was the Altes Theater (also Grupellotheater). The name Grupellotheater recalls that the building was the former casting house of the Baroque sculptor Gabriel de Grupello.

The old theatre house was used as a theatre as early as 1747, when Charles Theodore, Elector of Bavaria was staying in Düsseldorf. Around 1750 it was in operation as a comedy house. From 1751 onwards, regular theatre performances were given in the house. After Düsseldorf became Prussian, King Frederick William III donated the building, which had previously been state property, to the city of Düsseldorf on 11 April 1818, which henceforth leased it for theatre purposes. The first tenant was the Austrian actor and theatre director Joseph Derossi.

The playhouse on the market square was finally replaced by the new municipal theatre, built from 1873 to 1875 by Ernst Giese in the Neo-Renaissance style. The auditorium of the Stadttheater Düsseldorf was partially destroyed by the air raids on Düsseldorf in World War II, but was provisionally rebuilt during the war by order of the Reichstheaterkammer. In 1946, the state parliament of the newly founded state of North Rhine-Westphalia was able to use the opera house as a meeting place.

It reopened on October 2, 1946 under the musical direction of the Düsseldorf general music director Heinrich Hollreiser to the sounds of the Coriolan Overture by Ludwig van Beethoven. A comprehensive conversion to the Düsseldorf Opera House of the Deutsche Oper am Rhein was carried out according to plans by Paul Bonatz, Julius Schulte-Frohlinde and Ernst Huhn from 1954 to 1956.
