= Gustav Manker =

Gustav Manker (March 29, 1913 – July 7, 1988 in Vienna) was an Austrian theatre and TV film director and stage designer. From 1968 to 1979 he was the director of the Volkstheater in Vienna. His TV films include Das Konzert (1971), Gegen Torheit gibt es kein Mittel (1974) and Das Märchen (1976). His son Paulus is also a reputable film director and actor.
