= Timeline of Cologne =

Timeline of Cologne, North Rhine–Westphalia, Germany

Coordinates: 50.95°N 6.966667°E

The following is a timeline of the history of the city of Cologne, Germany.

== Prior to the 14th century ==
- 13 CE - Germanicus headquartered in Cologne.
- 15 CE - Town becomes administrative capital of Germania Inferior (approximate date).
- 50 CE - Romans establish Colonia.
- 80 CE - Eifel Aqueduct built.
- 90 CE - Population: 45,000.
- 260 - Cologne becomes capital of Gallic Empire.
- 310 - Bridge built over Rhine.
- 313 - Catholic diocese of Cologne established (approximate date).
- 451 - The Huns under Attila sack Cologne.
- 459 - Ripuarian Franks take power.
- 475 - Becomes the residence of the Frankish king Childeric I.
- 716 - Battle of Cologne.
- 795 - City becomes Archbishop's see.
- 960 - Great St. Martin Church founded.
- 974 - St. Andreas Church consecrated.
- 980 - Church of St. Pantaleon consecrated.
- 1003 - Deutz Abbey founded.
- 1065 - St. Maria im Kapitol built.
- 1106 - Church of the Holy Virgins built (approximate date).
- 1114 - Coat of arms of Cologne in use.
- 1160 - St. Cäcilien church built (approximate date).
- 1182 - City expands with suburbs and ramparts.
- 1184 - Richerzeche formed (approximate date).
- 1201 - The city joined the Hanseatic League.
- 1227 - St. Gereon's Basilica built.
- 1247 - St. Kunibert church consecrated.
- 1248 - Cologne Cathedral construction begins.
- 1250 - Great St. Martin Church built.
- 1259 - Konrad von Hochstaden (Archbishop of Cologne) expels the Richerzeche.
- 1260 - Church of the Minorites built (approximate date).
- 1288 - Battle of Worringen.

== 14th–18th centuries ==
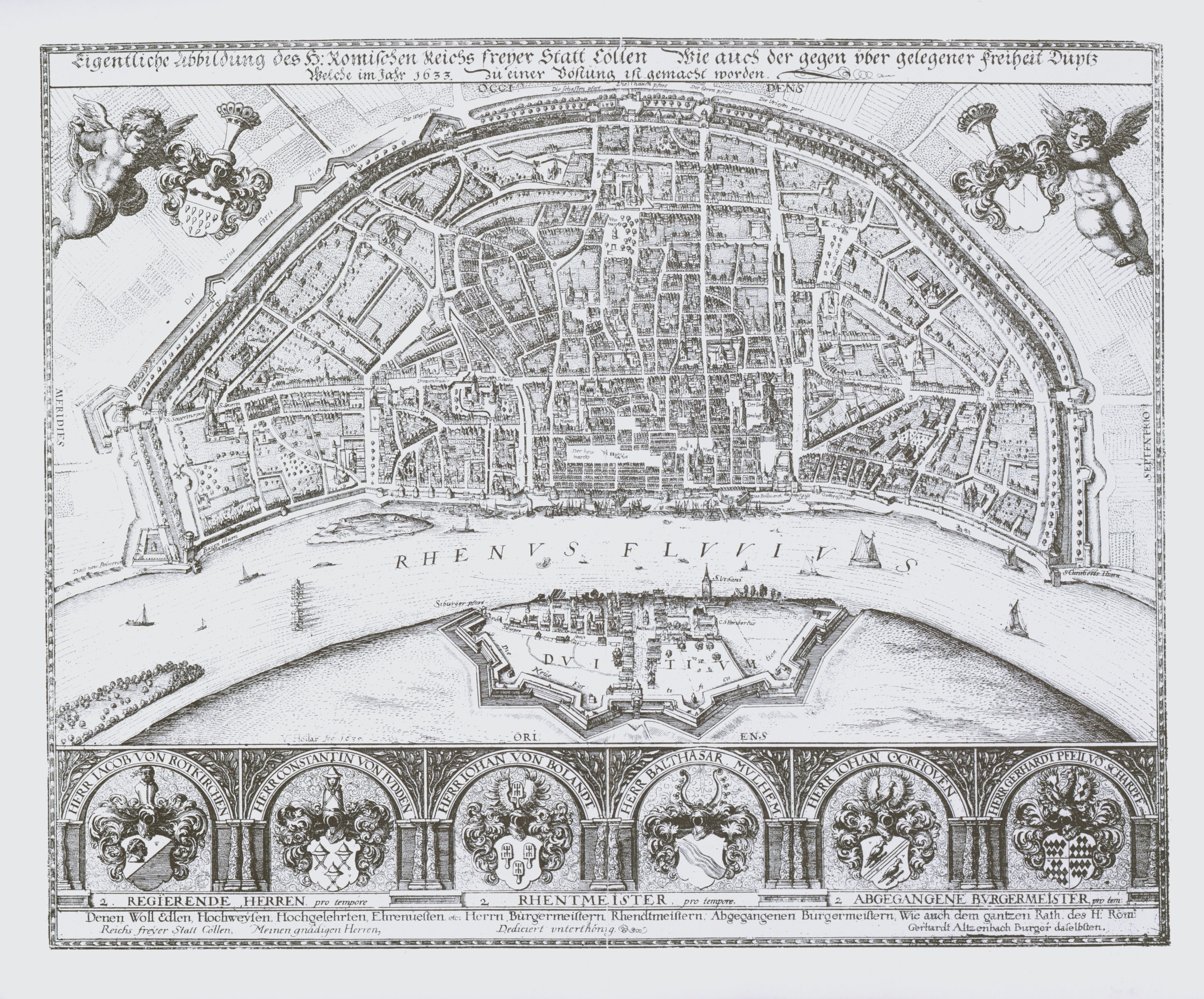
Map of Cologne, 1633

- 1322
  - Cologne Cathedral choir consecrated.
  - Municipal archive in operation (approximate date).
- 1334 - Cologne Charterhouse founded.
- 1388 - University of Cologne established.
- 1396 - Constitution of Cologne in effect.
- 1400 - Gothic artist known as "Master of Saint Veronica" active (approximate date).
- 1414 - Jews expelled.
- 1447 - Gürzenich built.
- 1450 - Dreikönigsgymnasium founded.
- 1466 - Ulrich Zell sets up printing press.
- 1473 - Work on Cologne Cathedral west front and towers suspended until 19th century
- 1475 - City becomes free imperial city.
- 1569 - Cologne City Hall building expanded.
- 1583/88 - Cologne War a religious conflict.
- 1584 - Apostolic Nuncio established.
- 1586 - Battle of Werl.
- 1608 - Protestants banished.
- 1626
  - Bertram Hilden sets up printing business.
  - Witch trials begin (approximate date).
- 1709 - Eau de Cologne launched by Giovanni Maria Farina.
- 1734 - Gazette de Cologne begins publication.
- 1783 - Theater an der Schmierstraße built.
- 1794 - Population: 40,000.
- 1795 - City directory published.
- 1796 - City annexed by French First Republic.
- 1798
  - University of Cologne closes.
  - Kölnische Zeitung newspaper begins publication.

== 19th century ==
- 1801 - Treaty of Lunéville incorporates the city into France.
- 1802 - Hänneschen puppet theatre founded.
- 1815 - Prussians take power, viz Congress of Vienna.
- 1823 - Rosenmontag (carnival) begins.
- 1827 - Gürzenich Orchestra Cologne formed.
- 1839 - Stollwerck confectionery established.
- 1840 - Gürzenich Orchestra Cologne active.
- 1842
  - Rheinische Zeitung begins publication.
  - Central-Dombauverein zu Köln (Central Cathedral Building Society) recommences construction work on Cologne Cathedral after 400 years.
- 1848 - Neue Rheinische Zeitung begins publication.
- 1849 - Population: 94,789 in city; 497,330 in region.
- 1850 - Conservatorium der Musik founded.
- 1853 - Diözesanmuseum founded.
- 1857 - Hotel du Dome opens.
- 1859
  - Cathedral Bridge built.
  - Köln Hauptbahnhof opens.
- 1860 - Zoo founded.
- 1861
  - Wallraf-Richartz Museum and Glockengasse Synagogue built.
  - Population: 120,568 in city; 567,435 in region.
- 1863 - Hotel Ernst opens.
- 1864 - Flora park laid out.
- 1872
  - Theater in der Glockengasse built.
  - Zimmermann bakery in business.
- 1874 - Wolkenburg (Köln) restored.
- 1876 - Kölner Stadt-Anzeiger begins publication.
- 1877 - Cologne Stadtbahn opens.
- 1880 - Cologne Cathedral completed.
- 1885
  - Population: 239,437.
  - City walls dismantled.
- 1888 - Bayenthal, Ehrenfeld, Lindenthal and Nippes incorporated into city.

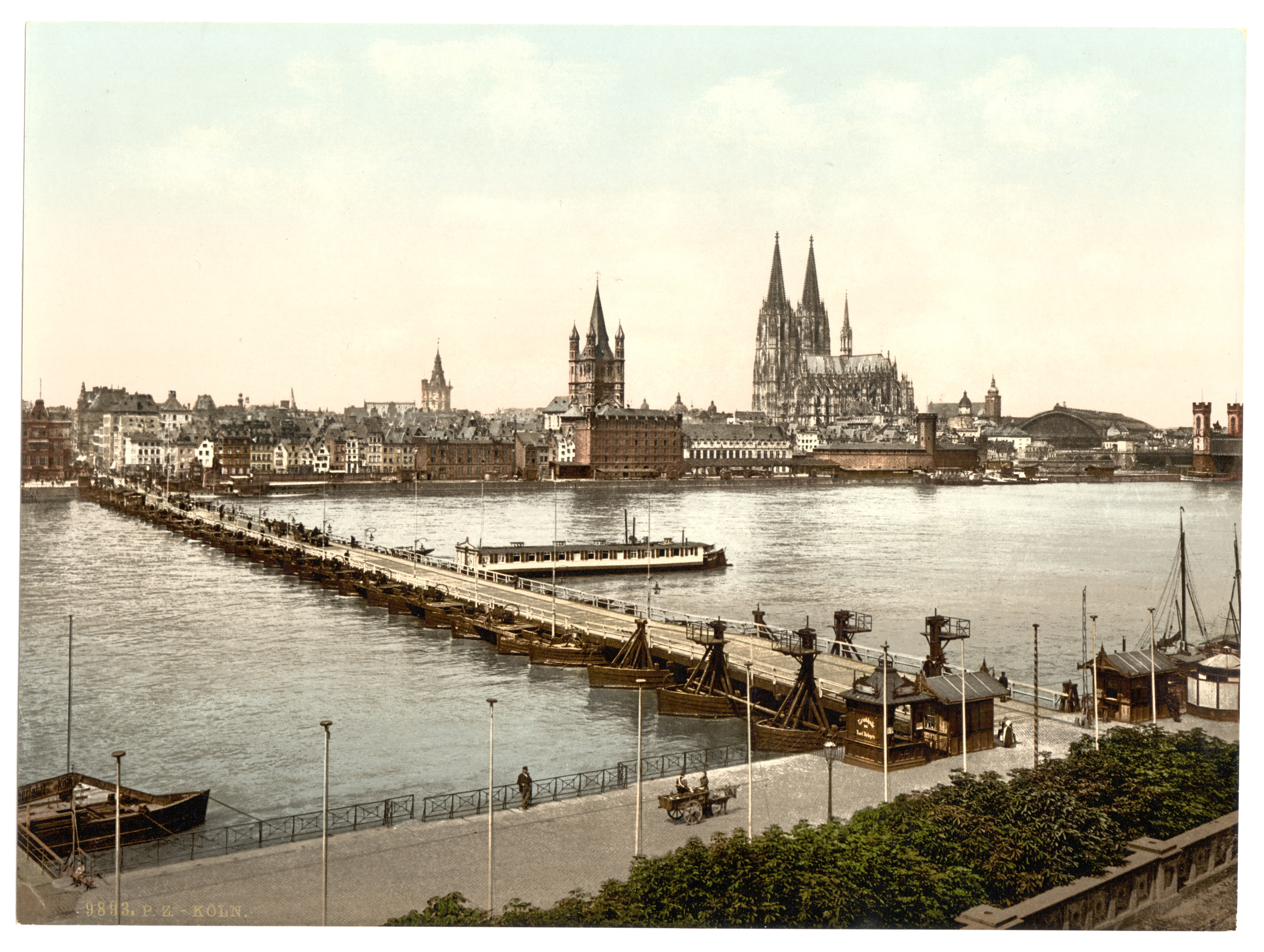
Cologne in the 1890s

- 1890 - Public Library established.
- 1894 - Main station rebuilt.
- 1900 - Population: 370,685.

== 20th century ==
=== 1900-1945 ===
- 1902 - Theater am Habsburger Ring built.
- 1904 - Oper der Stadt Köln formed.
- 1905 - Population: 428,503.
- 1906 - Schnütgen Museum founded.
- 1908 - 21 September: Mathematician Minkowski delivers "Raum und Zeit" lecture on spacetime.
- 1910
  - Kalk and Vingst incorporated into city.
  - Population: 516,527.
- 1911 - Hohenzollern Bridge built.
- 1913 - Rheinpark and Köln Messe/Deutz station open.
- 1914 - Werkbund Exhibition held.
- 1917 - Konrad Adenauer becomes mayor.
- 1919
  - Consulate of Poland opens.
  - Population: 633,904.
- 1921 - Jawne school built.
- 1925 - Population: 705,477.
- 1926
  - Airport opens.
  - Kölner Werkschulen established.
- 1928
  - Messeturm Köln built.
  - Polish Consulate relocated to Frankfurt, and replaced by a Polish Consular Agency in Cologne.
- 1930
  - Polish Consular Agency closed.
  - November: Flood.
- 1934 - University of Cologne reopens.
- 1938 - Kristallnacht.
- 1939 - Nazi camp for Sinti and Romani people established (see also Porajmos).
- 1940 - Bombing begins.
- 1942 - III SS construction brigade (forced labour camp) established by the SS. Its prisoners were mostly Poles and Soviets.
- 1944
  - May: III SS construction brigade camp relocated to Wieda.
  - 12 August: Ford-Werke subcamp of the Buchenwald concentration camp established. Its prisoners were mostly Soviets.
  - 15 August: Köln Stadt subcamp of the Buchenwald concentration camp established. Its prisoners were mostly Eastern Europeans.
  - 27 September: Westwaggon subcamp of the Buchenwald concentration camp established. Its prisoners were mostly Soviets.
  - 25 October: Köln Stadt subcamp of Buchenwald dissolved. Prisoners deported to the main Buchenwald camp.
  - November: Ehrenfeld Group executed.
  - November: 1. SS-Eisenbahnbaubrigade subcamp of the Mittelbau-Dora concentration camp based in Cologne.

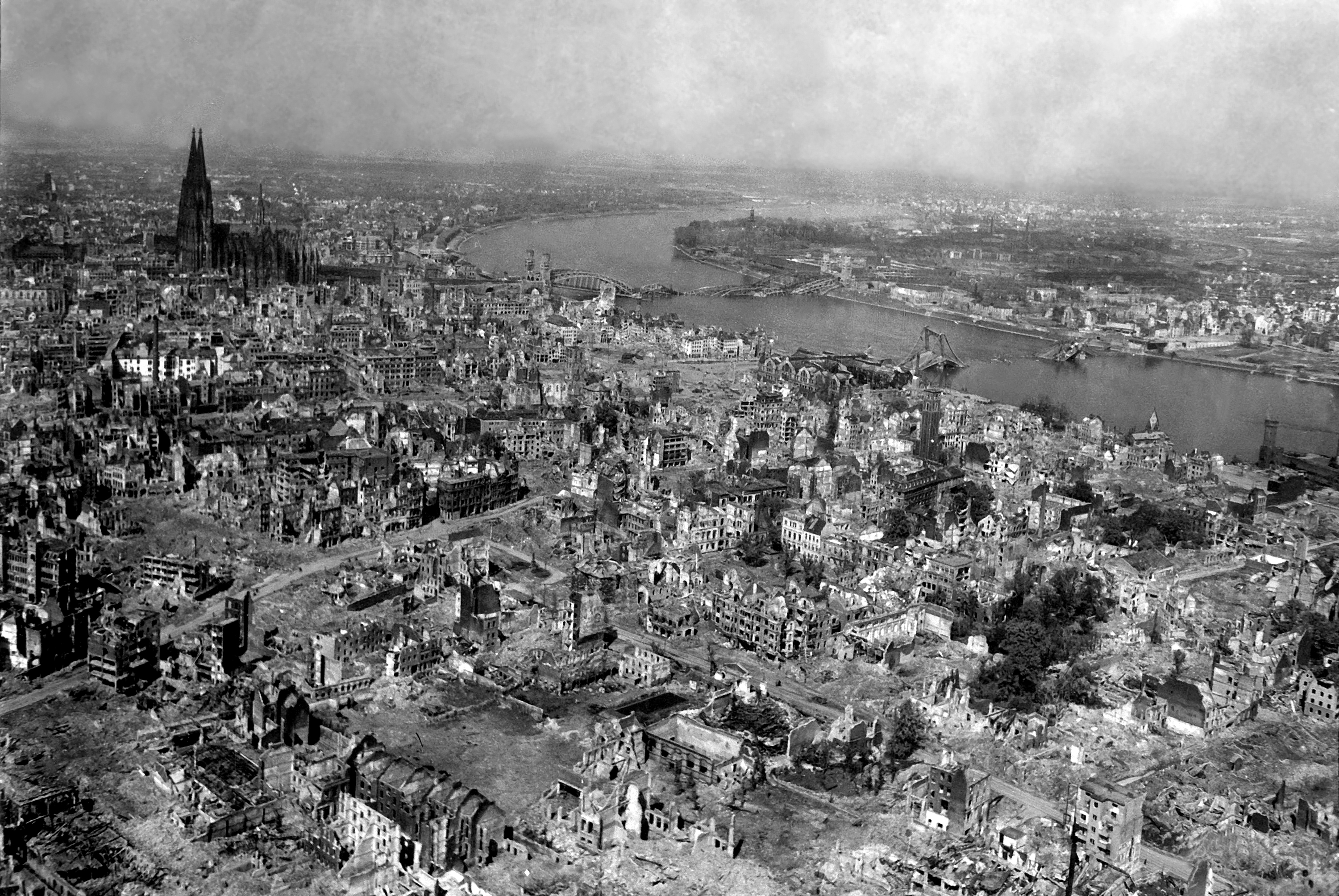
Overview of Cologne, April 1945

- 1945
  - February: Ford-Werke subcamp of Buchenwald dissolved. Prisoners deported to the main Buchenwald camp.
  - February: 1. SS-Eisenbahnbaubrigade subcamp relocated from Cologne.
  - March: Westwaggon subcamp of Buchenwald dissolved. Many prisoners deported to the main Buchenwald camp, dozens managed to escape.
  - American troops capture city.

=== 1946-1990s ===
- 1946 - Kölnische Rundschau begins publication.
- 1947
  - 27 March: Food protest.
  - Sport University founded.
  - Nordwestdeutschen Rundfunk orchestra formed.
- 1949
  - Kölner Stadt-Anzeiger resumes publication.
  - Cologne Furniture Fair begins.
- 1950 - Photokina trade fair begins.
- 1951 - Cologne Bonn Airport opens.
- 1954
  - Italian Cultural Institute in Cologne founded.
  - Cappella Coloniensis formed.
- 1955
  - February–March: City co-hosts the 1955 Ice Hockey World Championships.
  - Gaffel Haus rebuilt.
- 1957
  - Central Station rebuilt.
  - Opera house built.
  - Cable Car begins operating.
  - City hosts Bundesgartenschau (national horticulture biennial).
- 1960
  - Stadtwerke Köln established.
  - Population: 803,616.
- 1964
  - Express (German newspaper) newspaper begins publication.
  - School massacre.
  - Forstbotanischer Garten created.
- 1967 - Kölner Kunstmarkt begins.
- 1971 - Cologne University of Applied Sciences formed.
- 1973 - Association of Islamic Cultural Centres headquartered in city.
- 1976 - Gebühreneinzugszentrale and Museum Ludwig established.
- 1977 - Gesellschaft für Anlagen- und Reaktorsicherheit headquartered in city.
- 1981 - Colonius tower built.

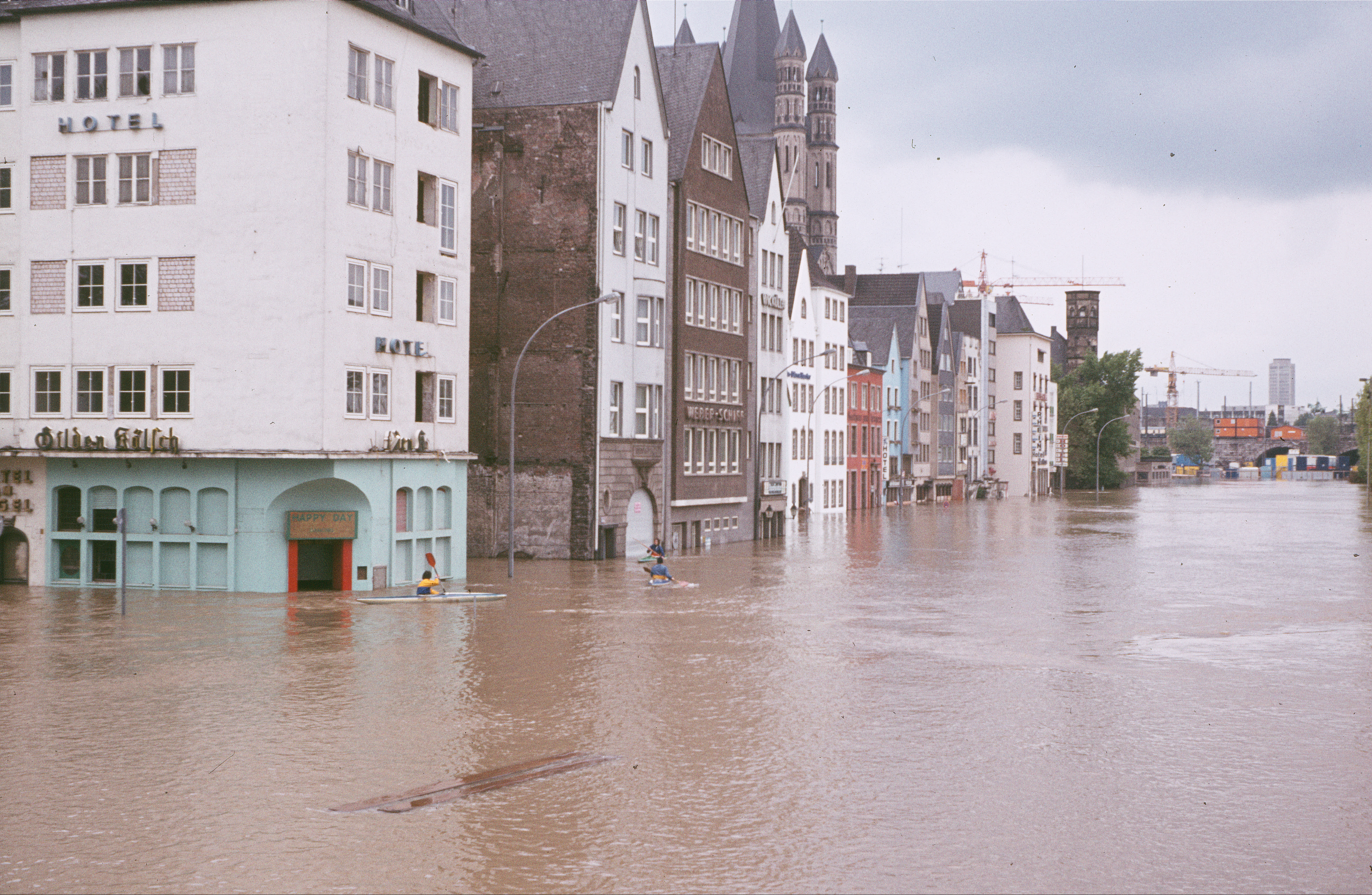
Flood in 1983

- 1983
  - April: Flood.
  - Akademie för uns Kölsche Sproch established.
- 1984
  - Centrum Schwule Geschichte established.
  - Turkish-Islamic Union for Religious Affairs headquartered in city.
  - Feminale film festival begins.
- 1985
  - Käthe Kollwitz Museum opens.
  - St. George's School founded.
- 1986 - Islamic Council for the Federal Republic of Germany headquartered in city.
- 1988 - NS Documentation Center established.
- 1990 - Academy of Media Arts Cologne established.
- 1991 - Cologne Conference (television and film festival) and Cologne Comedy Festival begin.
- 1992 - Cologne Festival of Early Music begins.
- 1993
  - Imhoff-Schokoladenmuseum opens.
  - Cologne Business School established.
  - Ringfest begins.
- 1994 - Central Council of Muslims in Germany headquartered in city.
- 1996 - Summerjam reggae festival begins.
- 1998
  - September: City hosts the 1998 World Rowing Championships.
  - Lanxess Arena opens.
- 1999
  - City website online (approximate date).
  - 25th G8 summit held in Cologne.
- 2000
  - Internationale Filmschule Köln established.
  - Population: 962,884.

== 21st century ==
- 2001
  - April–May: City co-hosts the 2001 IIHF World Championship.
  - KölnTurm built.
  - Zentralarchiv des internationalen Kunsthandels (archives) headquartered in Cologne.
- 2002 - Köln–Frankfurt high-speed rail line begins operating.
- 2004
  - 9 June: Bombing.
  - MediaPark constructed.
- 2005
  - City hosts Catholic World Youth Day.
  - Weltstadthaus built.
- 2006
  - International Women's Film Festival Dortmund/Cologne begins.
  - KölnTriangle built.
- 2009 - Jürgen Roters becomes mayor.
- 2010 - Population: 1,007,119
- 2014 - Rainer Maria Cardinal Woelki succeeds Joachim Cardinal Meisner as archbishop of Cologne
- 2015 - Henriette Reker becomes first female mayor of Cologne, one day after an assassination attempt on her at a market in Braunsfeld
- 2015-2016 - 2015-16 New Year's Eve sexual assaults in Germany
- 2017
  - May: City co-hosts the 2017 IIHF World Championship.
  - Cologne Central Mosque is completed.
- 2018
  - January: Flood.
  - 13 June: Terrorist plot foiled.
  - 15 October: 2018 Cologne attack
- 2025
  - 1 November: Torsten Burmester (SPD) becomes mayor of Cologne.

== See also ==
- History of Cologne
- List of mayors of Cologne
- Elector of Cologne
- Timelines of other cities in the state of North Rhine-Westphalia:^{(de)} Aachen, Bonn, Dortmund, Duisburg, Düsseldorf, Essen, Münster

== Bibliography ==
=== in English ===
- Thomas Nugent (1749), "Cologne", The Grand Tour, vol. 2: Germany and Holland, London: S. Birt, hdl:2027/mdp.39015030762572
- Monsieur de Blainville (1757), "Cologne", Travels through Holland, Germany, Switzerland, but especially Italy, Translated by Turnbull, London: John Noon
- Theodore Alois Buckley (1862), "Cologne", Great Cities of the Middle Ages (2nd ed.), London: Routledge, Warne, & Routledge
- "Cologne" . Encyclopædia Britannica. Vol. 6 (11th ed.). 1910. pp. 697–699.
- "Cologne", The Rhine, Leipzig: Karl Baedeker, 1911, OCLC 21888483
- "Cologne, Key City of the Rhineland", National Geographic Magazine, vol. 69, Washington DC, 1936
- Robert E. Dickinson (1961). "Structure of the German City: Cologne". The West European City (2nd ed.). Routledge. ISBN 978-1-136-25970-8.
- John M. Jeep, ed. (2001). "Cologne". Medieval Germany: an Encyclopedia. Garland Publishing. ISBN 0-8240-7644-3.
- Jonathan Bikker (2006). "Cologne, the 'German Rome,' in Views by Berckheyde and van der Heyden and the Journals of Seventeenth-Century Dutch Tourists". Simiolus: Netherlands Quarterly for the History of Art. 32 (4): 273–290. JSTOR 20355338.
- Jeffry M. Diefendorf (2008). "Reconciling competing pasts in postwar Cologne". In Gavriel David Rosenfeld; Paul B. Jaskot (eds.). Beyond Berlin: Twelve German Cities Confront the Nazi Past. USA: University of Michigan Press. ISBN 978-0-472-11611-9 – via HathiTrust. (fulltext)
- E. Rail (29 March 2012). "36 Hours: Cologne, Germany". New York Times.

=== in German ===
- "Cölln". Topographia Archiepiscopatuum Moguntinensis, Trevirensis et Coloniensis. Topographia Germaniae (in German). Frankfurt. 1646. p. 60+.
- Cöln. Die Chroniken der Deutschen Städte (in German). Vol. 12–14. Leipzig: S. Hirzel Verlag. 1875–1877 – via HathiTrust.
- Karl von Hegel (1891). "Koln". Städte und Gilden der germanischen Völker im Mittelalter (in German). Vol. 2. Leipzig: Duncker & Humblot. hdl:2027/wu.89094689700 – via HathiTrust.
- Paul Clemen, ed. (1906). Kunstdenkmäler der Stadt Koln. Die Kunstdenkmäler der Rheinprovinz (in German). Vol. 6. Dusseldorf: Schwann.
- P. Krauss; E. Uetrecht, eds. (1913). "Coln". Meyers Deutscher Städteatlas [Meyer's Atlas of German Cities] (in German). Leipzig: Bibliographisches Institut.
- Koln, Deutscher Städteatlas (in German), vol. 2, Institut für vergleichende Städtegeschichte, 1979, ISBN 3891150008
- Wolfgang Adam; Siegrid Westphal, eds. (2012). "Koln". Handbuch kultureller Zentren der Frühen Neuzeit: Städte und Residenzen im alten deutschen Sprachraum (in German). De Gruyter. pp. 1093–1152. ISBN 978-3-11-029555-9.
