= List of mayors of Cologne =

This is a list of mayors of Cologne. It includes the Lord Mayors of Cologne (Oberbürgermeister der Stadt Köln) since 1815 as well as the city managers (Oberstadtdirektoren) from 1946 to 1999.

== Mayors since 1815 ==
Coat of arms of Cologne

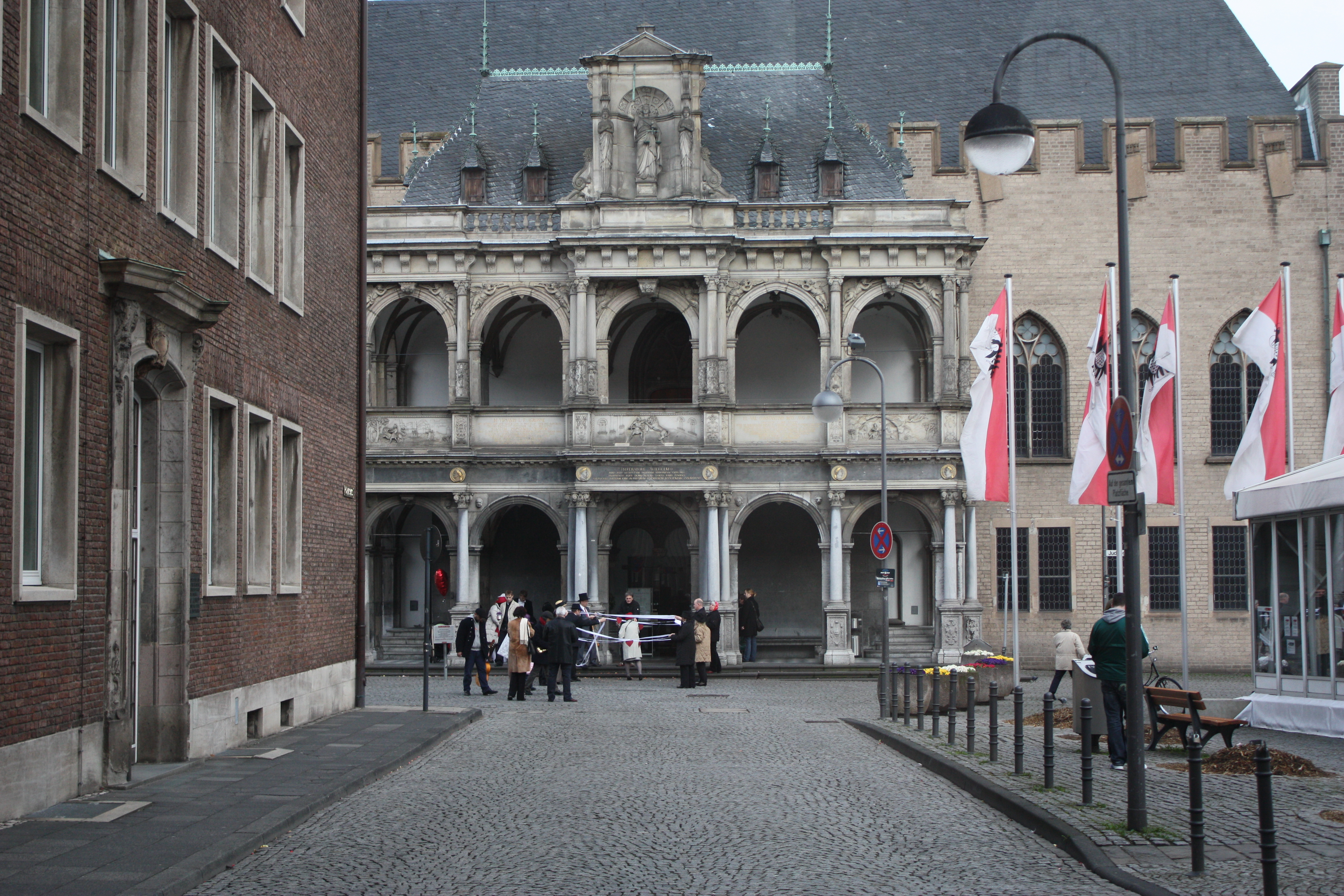
Cologne City Hall

=== Lord Mayors of Cologne (1815–1945) ===
==== In Prussia ====
- 1815–1819: Karl Joseph Freiherr von Mylius
- 1819–1823: von Monschaw
- 1823–1848: Johann Adolf Steinberger
- 1848–1851: Friedrich Wilhelm Gräff
- 1851–1863: Hermann Joseph Stupp
- 1863–1871: Alexander Bachem

==== German Reich ====
Political party:

Portrait	Name (Birth–Death)	Term of office			Political party
Portrait	Name (Birth–Death)	Took office	Left office	Days	Political party
German Empire (1871–1918)
	Alexander Bachem (1806–1878)	18 January 1871	29 May 1875	1592	Independent
	Hermann Heinrich Becker (1820–1885)	5 June 1875	9 December 1885	3840	German Progress Party
	Friedrich Wilhelm von Becker (1835–1924)	1 June 1886	14 September 1907	7774	Independent
	Max Wallraf (1859–1941)	1 October 1907	8 August 1917	3599	Independent
	Konrad Adenauer (1876–1967)	18 October 1917	9 November 1918	387	Centre Party
Weimar Republic (1918–1933)
	Konrad Adenauer (1876–1967)	9 November 1918	30 January 1933	5196	Centre Party
Nazi Germany (1933–1945)
	Konrad Adenauer (1876–1967)	30 January 1933	13 March 1933	42	Centre Party
	Günter Riesen (1892–1951); Acting	13 March 1933	8 December 1936	1366	Nazi Party
	Karl Georg Schmidt (1904–1940)	20 January 1937	26 November 1940	1406	Nazi Party
	Peter Winkelnkemper (1902–1944)	3 January 1941	20 June 1944	1264	Nazi Party
	Robert Brandes (1899–1987); Acting	20 June 1944	6 March 1945	259	Nazi Party

=== Lord Mayor of Cologne (1945–present) ===
Political party: CDU SPD

Portrait	Name (Birth–Death)	Term of office			Political party
Portrait	Name (Birth–Death)	Took office	Left office	Days	Political party
French occupation zone (1945–1949)
1	Konrad Adenauer (1876–1967)	4 May 1945	6 October 1945	155	Christian Democratic Union
–	Willi Suth (1881–1956); Acting	6 October 1945	20 November 1945	45	Christian Democratic Union
2	Hermann Pünder (1888–1976)	20 November 1945	23 August 1946	276	Christian Democratic Union
On 23 August 1946, Cologne became a city of the newly founded state of North Rhine-Westphalia
(2)	Hermann Pünder (1888–1976)	23 August 1946	31 May 1948	647	Christian Democratic Union
3	Ernst Schwering (1886–1962)	1 June 1948	15 November 1948	167	Christian Democratic Union
4	Robert Görlinger (1888–1954)	15 November 1948	23 May 1949	189	Social Democratic Party
Federal Republic of Germany (1949–present)
North Rhine-Westphalia became a federal state of the Federal Republic of Germany
(4)	Robert Görlinger (1888–1954)	23 May 1949	9 December 1949	200	Social Democratic Party
5	Ernst Schwering (1886–1962)	9 December 1949	23 November 1950	349	Christian Democratic Union
6	Robert Görlinger (1888–1954)	23 November 1950	8 November 1951	350	Social Democratic Party
7	Ernst Schwering (1886–1962)	8 November 1951	9 November 1956	1828	Christian Democratic Union
8	Theo Burauen (1906–1987)	9 November 1956	17 December 1973	6247	Social Democratic Party
9	John van Nes Ziegler (1921–2006)	20 December 1973	28 October 1980	2504	Social Democratic Party
10	Norbert Burger (1932–2012)	28 October 1980	30 September 1999	6911	Social Democratic Party
11	Harry Blum (1944–2000)	1 October 1999	17 March 2000	168	Christian Democratic Union
12	Fritz Schramma (1947–2026)	17 September 2000	20 October 2009	3320	Christian Democratic Union
13	Jürgen Roters (born 1949)	21 October 2009	20 October 2015	2190	Social Democratic Party
14	Henriette Reker (born 1956)	22 October 2015	31 October 2025	3662	Independent
15	Torsten Burmester (born 1963)	1 November 2025	Incumbent	290	Social Democratic Party

== City managers 1946–1999 ==
- 1946–1953: Dr. Willi Suth
- 1953–1965: Dr. Max Adenauer
- 1965–1977: Prof. Dr. Heinz Mohnen
- 1977–1989: Kurt Rossa
- 1989–1998: Lothar Ruschmeier
- 1998–1999: Klaus Heugel

== See also ==
- Timeline of Cologne
