= Harry Blum (politician) =

German politician

Harry Blum (18. October 1944 in Lennestadt-Elspe, Sauerland – 17. March 2000 in Cologne) was a German politician and member of the CDU. On 1. October 1999 he became the first directly elected mayor of Cologne, but he only held that office for six months when he died suddenly in March 2000.

== Background and earlier life ==
Harry Blum was born Johannes Jacob Blum into an Old Colognian family, but the family was evacuated during the war. He received his Abitur at Dreikönigsgymnasium and studied law at the University of Cologne. Blum joined the Christian Democratic Union in 1964 and was a member of the city council since 1984.

== Mayor of Cologne ==
Shortly before his election as mayor he adopted his long-time nickname as official first name and was henceforth Harry Johannes Jacob Blum. As one of his initiatives as councillor and mayor was the implementation of an architectural lighting concept for the city, which helped the city win the city.people.light award 2005.

== Legacy ==
Harry-Blum-Platz in Cologne's Rheinauhafen is named after him.
