= Cologne Cathedral bomb plot =

2023 planned Islamist car bombing in Germany

In December 2023, an apparent Islamist plot to bomb Cologne Cathedral was discovered.

== Plot ==
During December 2023 in Germany, North Rhine-Westphalia Police arrested five suspects who are alleged to be affiliated with Islamic State – Khorasan Province. Local media reported that a car bombing at Cologne Cathedral was planned to be carried out on 31 December 2023. Police are guarding the cathedral; they searched it but did not find anything.

== See also ==
- 2004 Cologne bombing
- 2018 Cologne attack
- 2018 Cologne terrorist plot
- Notre-Dame de Paris bombing attempt
- St Paul's Cathedral bomb plot
- Strasbourg Cathedral bombing plot
