= Jochen Ott =

German teacher and politician

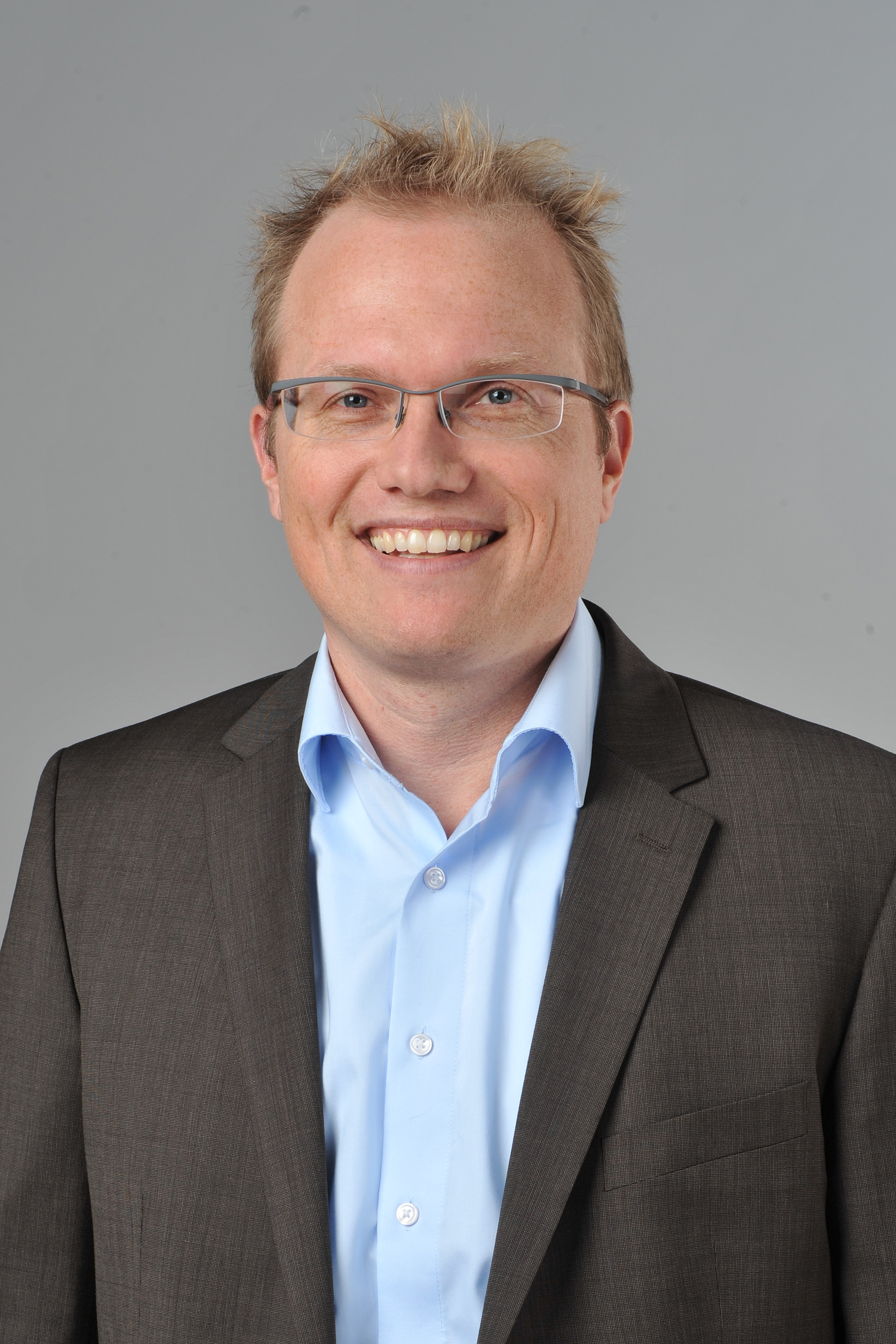
Ott in 2013

Jochen Ott (9 May 1974 in Porz) is a German teacher and politician of the Social Democrats (SPD) who has been serving as member of the Landtag of North Rhine-Westphalia since 2010.

== Political career ==
From 2011 until 2019, Ott served as the leader of the party in Cologne. In 2015, he unsuccessfully ran to become Mayor of Cologne; he eventually suspended his mayoral election campaign in 2015 after the stabbing of his main rival Henriette Reker.

In parliament, Ott serves on the Committee on Education.

== Other activities ==
=== Corporate boards ===
- NRW.BANK, Member of the Advisory Board (since 2018)
- Cologne Bonn Airport, Deputy Chairman of the Supervisory Board
- RheinCargo, Member of the Supervisory Board

=== Non-profit organization ===
- Westdeutscher Rundfunk (WDR), Alternate Member of the Broadcasting Council
- Education and Science Workers' Union (GEW), Member
