= Electorate of Cologne =

State of the Holy Roman Empire (953–1803)

Coordinates: 51°0′N 6°50′E

Electorate of Cologne Kurfürstentum Köln (German)
- 953–1803
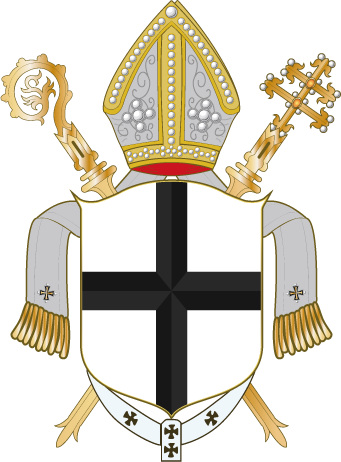
- Flag Coat of arms

- Map of the Lower Rhine around 1560 with the Electorate of Cologne highlighted in red, including the Duchy of Westphalia
- Status: State of the Holy Roman Empire; Imperial elector
- Capital: Cologne (953–1288); Bonn (1597–1794)
- Government: Prince-Archbishopric
- Elector of Cologne
  - 1238-1261: Konrad von Hochstaden
  - 1801–1803: Archduke Anton Victor of Austria
- Historical era: Middle Ages
  - Bishopric established: Ancient Roman times
  - Elevated to archbishopric: 953
  - Bruno I archbishop: 953
  - Arch-chancellor of Italy: 1031
  - Cologne made Free Imperial City: 1288
  - Joined Electoral Rhenish Circle: 1512
  - German mediatization: 1803
Preceded by
Duchy of Lorraine
Succeeded by
Landgraviate of Hesse-Darmstadt
Duchy of Nassau
Wied-Runkel
Rhin-et-Moselle
Roer (department)

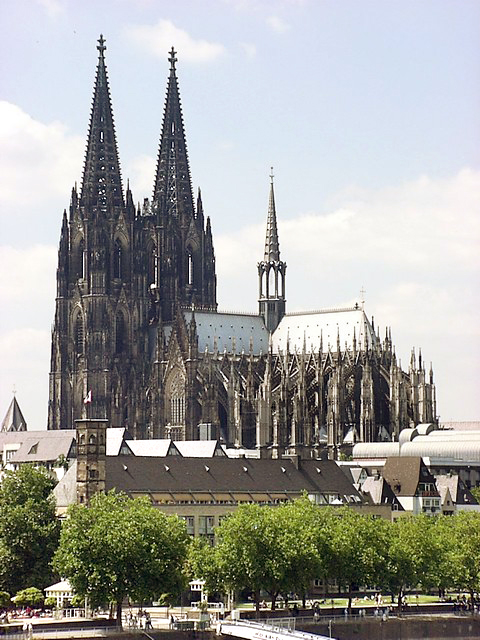
Cologne Cathedral

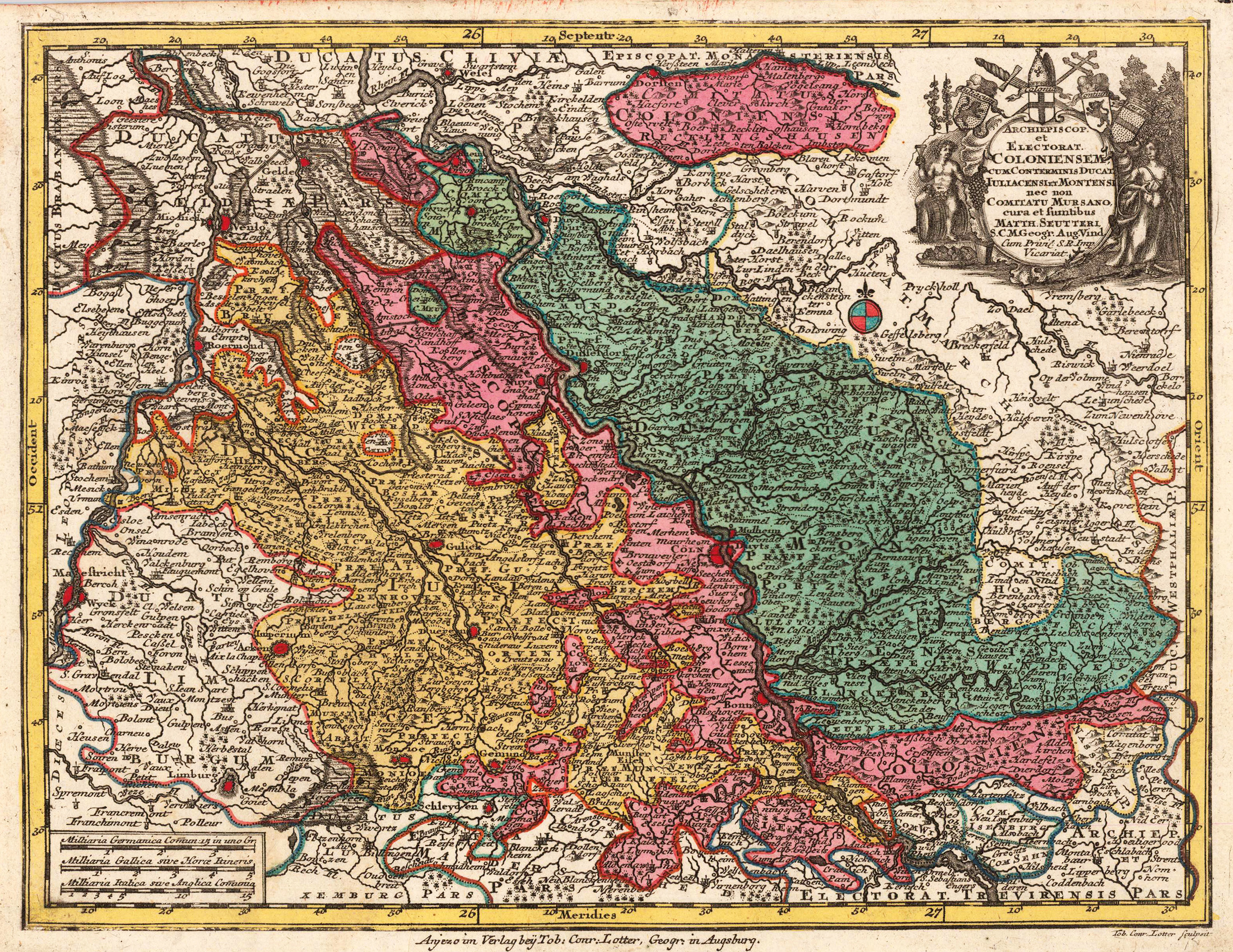
The Electorate of Cologne (red) and neighboring states in the mid-18th century

The Electorate of Cologne (German: Kurfürstentum Köln), sometimes referred to as Electoral Cologne (German: Kurköln), was an ecclesiastical principality of the Holy Roman Empire that existed from the 10th to the early 19th century. It consisted of the Hochstift—the temporal possessions—of the archbishop of Cologne, and was ruled by him in his capacity as prince-elector. There were only two other ecclesiastical prince-electors in the Empire: the Electorate of Mainz and the Electorate of Trier. The archbishop-elector of Cologne was also arch-chancellor of Italy (one of the three component titular kingdoms of the Holy Roman Empire, the other two being Germany and Burgundy) and, as such, ranked second among all ecclesiastical and secular princes of the Empire, after the archbishop-elector of Mainz, and before that of Trier.

The capital of the electorate was Cologne. Conflicts with the citizens of Cologne caused the elector to move to Bonn. The Free Imperial City of Cologne was recognized after 1475, thus removing it from even the nominal secular authority of the elector. Cologne and Bonn were occupied by France in 1794. The right bank territories of the electorate were secularized in 1803 during the German mediatization.

The electorate should not be confused with the Roman Catholic Archdiocese of Cologne, the area over which the archbishop exercised spiritual authority, which was larger. Even larger was the Ecclesiastical Province of Cologne, which included suffragan dioceses such as Liège and Münster (see map below).

== History ==
Cologne was the ancient Roman city of Colonia Agrippina in the province of Germania Inferior, and has been a bishop's see since Roman times. In 953, the archbishops of Cologne first gained noteworthy secular power, when Bishop Bruno was appointed as duke by his brother Emperor Otto I. To weaken the secular nobility, who threatened his power, Otto endowed Bruno and his successors in the bishop's seat with the prerogatives of secular princes. This was the beginning of the electoral state of Cologne. It was formed from the temporal possessions of the archbishopric and included in the end a strip of territory along the left Bank of the Rhine east of Jülich, and the Duchy of Westphalia on the other side of the Rhine, beyond Berg and Mark.

By the end of the 12th century, the Archbishop of Cologne was one of the seven electors of the Holy Roman Emperor. Besides being prince-elector, he was Arch-chancellor of Italy as well, technically from 1238 and permanently from 1263 until 1803. In the Battle of Worringen (1288), the archbishop was captured by soldiers of the city and was forced to grant the city near-complete autonomy. Eventually, the archbishop moved to Bonn to escape jurisdiction conflicts with the city government. In 1475, Cologne became a Free Imperial City, independent from the archbishop. The first pogrom against the Jews was in 1349, when they were used as scapegoats for the Black Death, and therefore burnt in an auto-da-fé. Political tensions arose from issues of taxation, public spending, regulation of business, and market supervision, as well as the limits of corporate autonomy.

Long-distance trade in the Baltic grew, as the major trading towns came together in the Hanseatic League, under the leadership of Lübeck. It was a business alliance of trading cities and their guilds that dominated trade along the coast of Northern Europe and flourished from the 1200 to 1500 and continued with lesser importance after that. The chief cities were Cologne on the Rhine River, Hamburg and Bremen on the North Sea, and Lübeck on the Baltic. The economic structures of medieval and early modern Cologne were based on the city's major harbor, its location as a transport hub and its entrepreneurial merchants who built ties with merchants in other Hanseatic cities.

During the 16th century, two Archbishops of Cologne converted to Protestantism. The first, Hermann von Wied, resigned the archbishopric on converting, but Gebhard Truchsess von Waldburg, who converted to Calvinism in 1582, attempted to secularize the archbishopric. His marriage the following February, and his refusal to relinquish the territory resulted in the election of a competing archbishop and prince-elector, Ernst of Bavaria, brother of the Wittelsbach Duke of Bavaria. In the Cologne War that followed, the pope funded Italian and Spanish mercenaries and the Catholic Bavarians also sent an army to support Ernst, while the Protestant Netherlands supported von Waldburg. The war ruined most of the Electoral economy, and many villages and towns were besieged and destroyed. The Siege of Godesberg in November–December 1583 ended with the destruction of Godesberg Castle and the slaughter of most of its inhabitants. After several more sieges, von Waldburg gave up his claim to the see and retired to Strasbourg with his wife. Ernst became archbishop–the first major success of the Counter-Reformation in Germany. Under Ernst's direction, Jesuits supervised the reintroduction of Catholicism in the Electorate. From 1583 to 1761, the archbishopric was effectively a secundogeniture of the Bavarian branch of the House of Wittelsbach. As the archbishop in this period usually also held the Bishopric of Münster (and often the Bishopric of Liège), he was one of the most important princes of northwestern Germany.

From 1597 until 1794, Bonn was the residence the Elector, and consequently the capital of the Electorate.

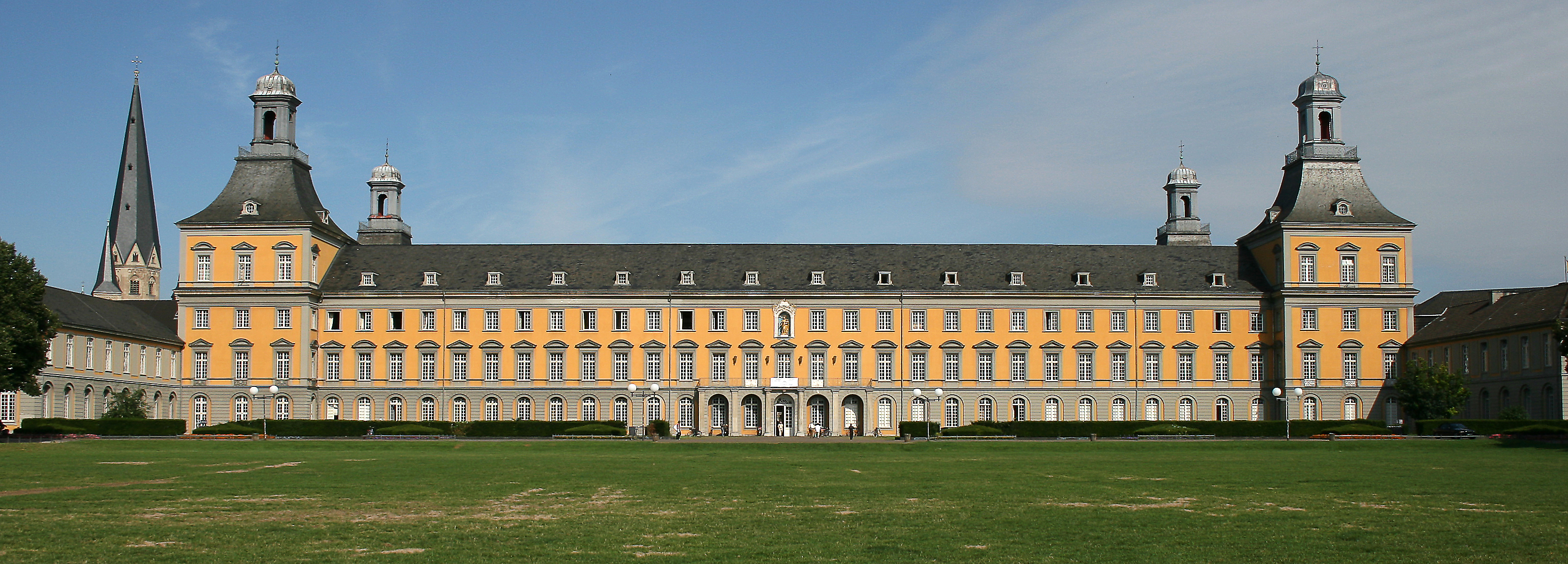
Electoral Palace, Bonn

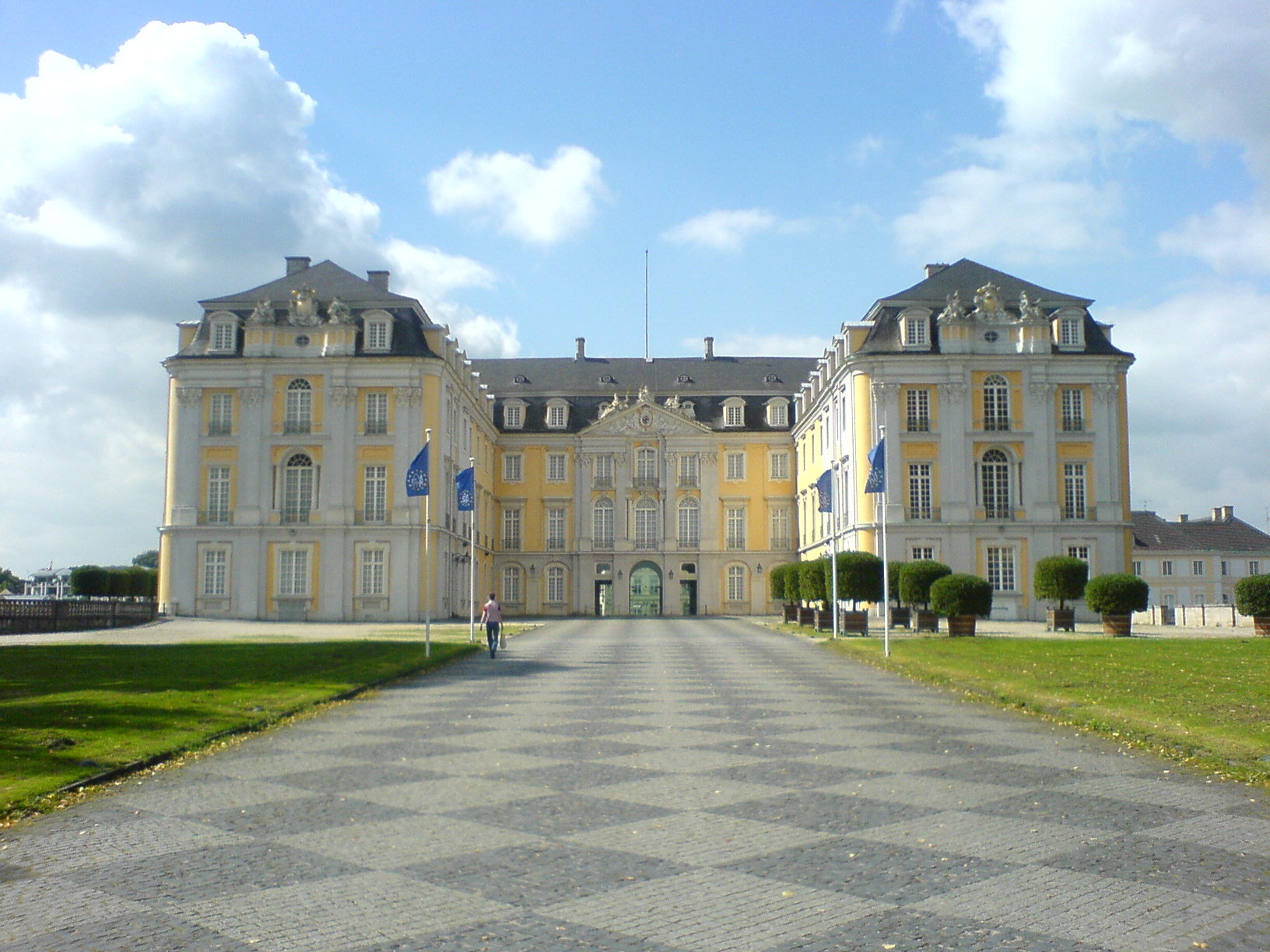
Augustusburg Palace

After 1795, the electorate's territories on the left bank of the Rhine were occupied by France and were formally annexed in 1801. Cologne was part of the département of Roer; Bonn was part of the département of Rhin-et-Moselle. The Reichsdeputationshauptschluss of 1803 secularized the rest of the archbishopric, giving the Duchy of Westphalia to the Landgraviate of Hesse-Darmstadt and Vest Recklinghausen to the Duke of Arenberg. Cologne was, however, reestablished as the seat of a Catholic archbishop in 1824, and is an archdiocese to the present day.
