= Henriette Reker =

German lawyer and politician (born 1956)

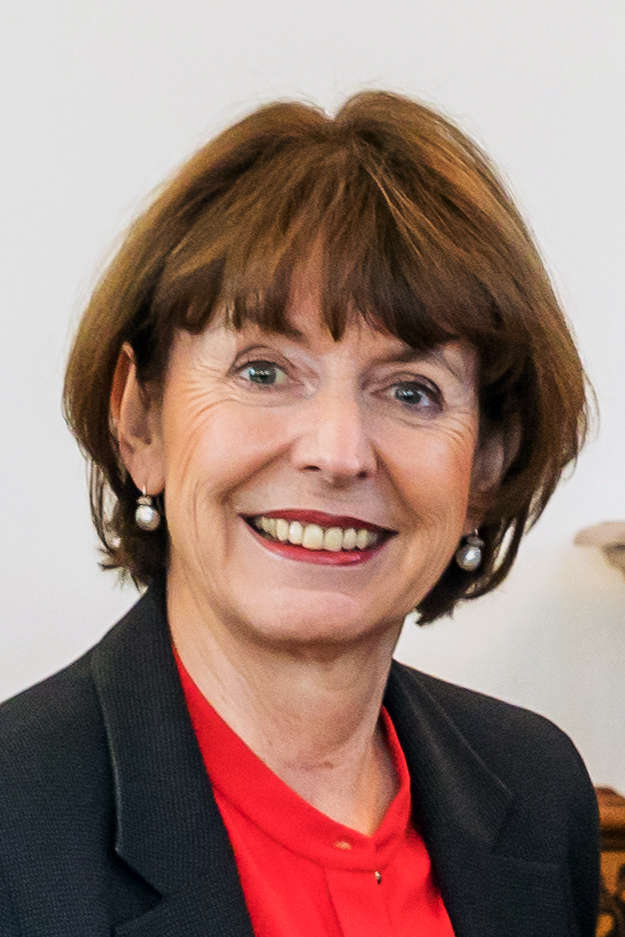
- Reker in 2019

Mayor of Cologne
- In office 20 November 2015 – 31 October 2025
- Preceded by: Jürgen Roters
- Succeeded by: Torsten Burmester

Personal details
- Born: 9 December 1956 (age 69) Cologne, North Rhine-Westphalia, West Germany
- Party: Independent

Henriette Reker (born 9 December 1956) is a German lawyer and independent politician. She is known for her pro-immigration stance and for being the victim of an assassination attempt in 2015. A day after the attack, Reker was elected mayor of Cologne after gaining 52.66% of the votes, becoming the first woman to hold the office. Reker was re-elected in 2020. Her term as mayor ended on 31 October 2025.

== Early life ==
Reker was born to Josef Reker and Gretel Martini and raised in the Cologne district of Bickendorf. Reker's mother was a life-long member of the SPD and moved to Cologne from Lower Silesia after World War II, while her father was a pastry chef who lived in Vogelsang district his whole life.

Reker attended Liebfrauenschule, where she finished her Abitur in 1976. She studied law at the Universities of Cologne, Regensburg, and Göttingen, completing her second state law examination in 1986 at District Court Münster.

Between 1990 and 1992, Reker worked as a clerk for an employers' liability insurance association in Bielefeld, then as legal counsel for the State Association of Guild Health Insurance Funds in Münster from until 2000. She gained her admission to practice law in 1996.

== Political career ==
From 2000 until 2010, Reker served as deputy mayor for Social Affairs, Health and Consumer Protection of Gelsenkirchen. In 2010 she was appointed a mayoral deputy for social affairs, integration and the environment of the city of Cologne.

Supported by the CDU, FDP, and The Greens, Reker ran for Mayor of Cologne in October 2015 and was re-elected in September 2020. At the end of January 2025, Reker announced she would not seek a third term as mayor, her term as mayor ended on 31 October 2025.

=== Assassination attempt ===
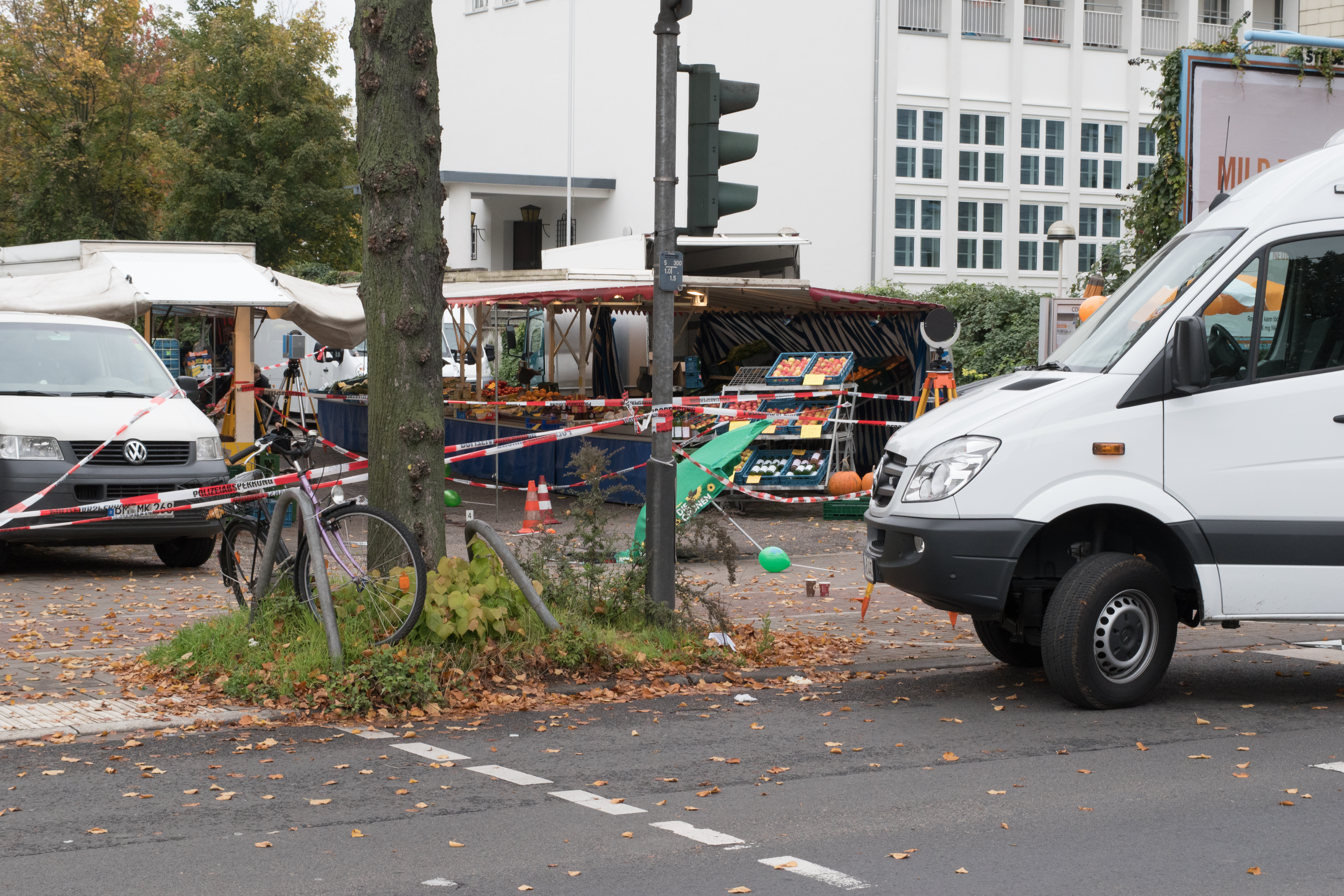
Crime scene of the attack on Reker

At a public event on 17 October 2015, the day before the mayoral election, Reker was seriously wounded when a 44-year-old German man stabbed her in the neck with a knife, while shouting about an "influx of refugees". Her aide was also hurt in the attack, as were three other people who had tried to subdue her attacker. State prosecutors confirmed the attack to be politically motivated, after the perpetrator "confessed to having xenophobic motives at the uncontrolled influx of migrants". He was also found to have been a former associate of the Free German Workers' Party in the 1990s and attempted to contact the National Democratic Party of Germany in 2008. As a member of Cologne's municipal administration, Reker had been responsible for the housing and integration of refugees. Reker's main rival in the mayoral election, Social Democrat Jochen Ott, suspended his campaign after the attack. Reker won the election while remaining in the intensive care unit of a local hospital.

Federal prosecutors soon took over the case from state prosecutors in Cologne on grounds of the particularly dangerous nature of the stabbing, which came against the backdrop of a rising tide of attacks on accommodation for refugees in Germany. In late October, they charged Frank S. with attempted murder and dangerous bodily harm. At the time, the authorities said the perpetrator was driven by his anger over Reker's work on the refugee issue. The attacker was sentenced to fourteen years in prison, with Reker recovering to testify at the trial.

=== New Year's Eve sexual assaults on women ===
Reker was accused of victim blaming following the attacks at Cologne's 2016 New Year's Eve celebrations. She claimed that "there's always the possibility of keeping a certain distance of more than an arm's length – that is to say to make sure yourself you don't look to be too close to people who are not known to you, and to whom you don't have a trusting relationship". Reker was condemned by Lodewijk Asscher, Deputy Prime Minister of the Netherlands, for implying that women could have prevented the attacks against themselves. Reker accused the media of taking her comments out of context: she claimed that she had only reacted to a reporter's question by quoting an existing communal guideline for safety during partying in a speech.

== Other activities ==
=== Corporate boards ===
- Cologne Bonn Airport, ex-officio member of the supervisory board
- Koelnmesse, ex-officio chairwoman of the supervisory board
- NRW.BANK, member of the advisory board
- Rheinenergie, member of the advisory board
- RWE, member of the advisory board
- Stadtwerke Köln, ex-officio member of the supervisory board

=== Non-profit organizations ===
- 1. FC Köln, member of the advisory board (since 2019)
- Theodor Heuss Foundation, member of the board of trustees (since 2019)
- Academy of Media Arts Cologne (KHM), member of the board of trustees
- Technical University of Cologne, member of the board of trustees
- Stiftung Lebendige Stadt, member of the board of trustees
- German Society for Photography (DGPh), member
- Kölnische Karnevalsgesellschaft, member
- Soroptimist International (SI), Member
- Amerika Haus e.V. NRW, ex-officio member of the board of trustees
- Stiftung Stadtgedächtnis, member of the board of trustees
- Society for Control of Common Diseases in the Ruhr District, chairwoman
- Kliniken der Stadt Köln gGmbH, member of the supervisory board (2011–2015)
- Godeshöhe Neurological Rehabilitation Center, member of the supervisory board (2011–2015)
- RehaNova Neurological and Neurosurgical Rehabilitation Clinic, member of the supervisory board (2011–2015)
