= Hermann Heinrich Becker (politician) =

German politician and Mayor (1820–1885)

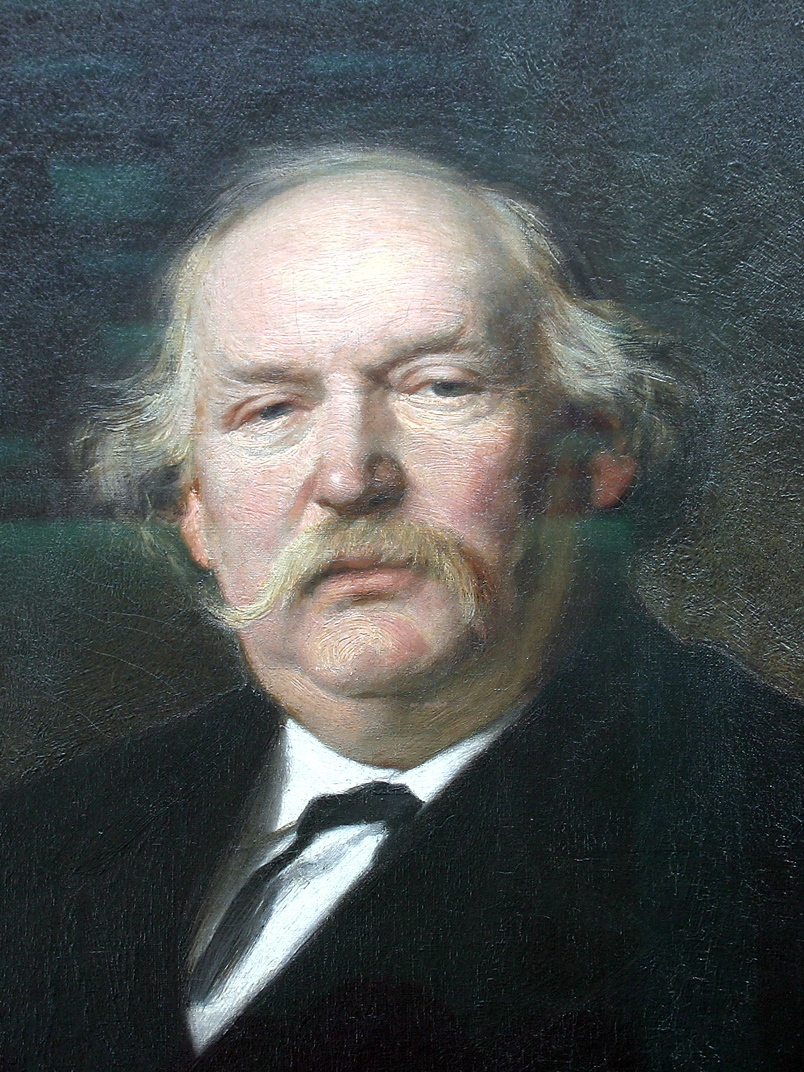
Portrait by Julius Schrader, 1878

Hermann Heinrich Becker (15 September 1820, Elberfeld – 9 December 1885, Cologne) was a German politician and member of the German Progress Party. Becker was born to Dr. Hermann Becker and Theodora Helene Caroline Wilhelmine Friedrike Becker, née Krackrügge. Becker studied law at Heidelberg, Bonn and Berlin, and graduated on 10 May 1847.

He was mayor of Dortmund from 1870 to 1875 and mayor of Cologne from 1875 to 1885. He was also a member of the Prussian House of Representatives from 1862 to 1873. On 8 October 1877 he married Henriette Metzmacher (1847–1928), daughter of his old friend Carl Metzmacher. However, the marriage did not last very long. Becker died on 9 December 1885 from tuberculosis.
