= Richerzeche =

Powerful organization in medieval Cologne

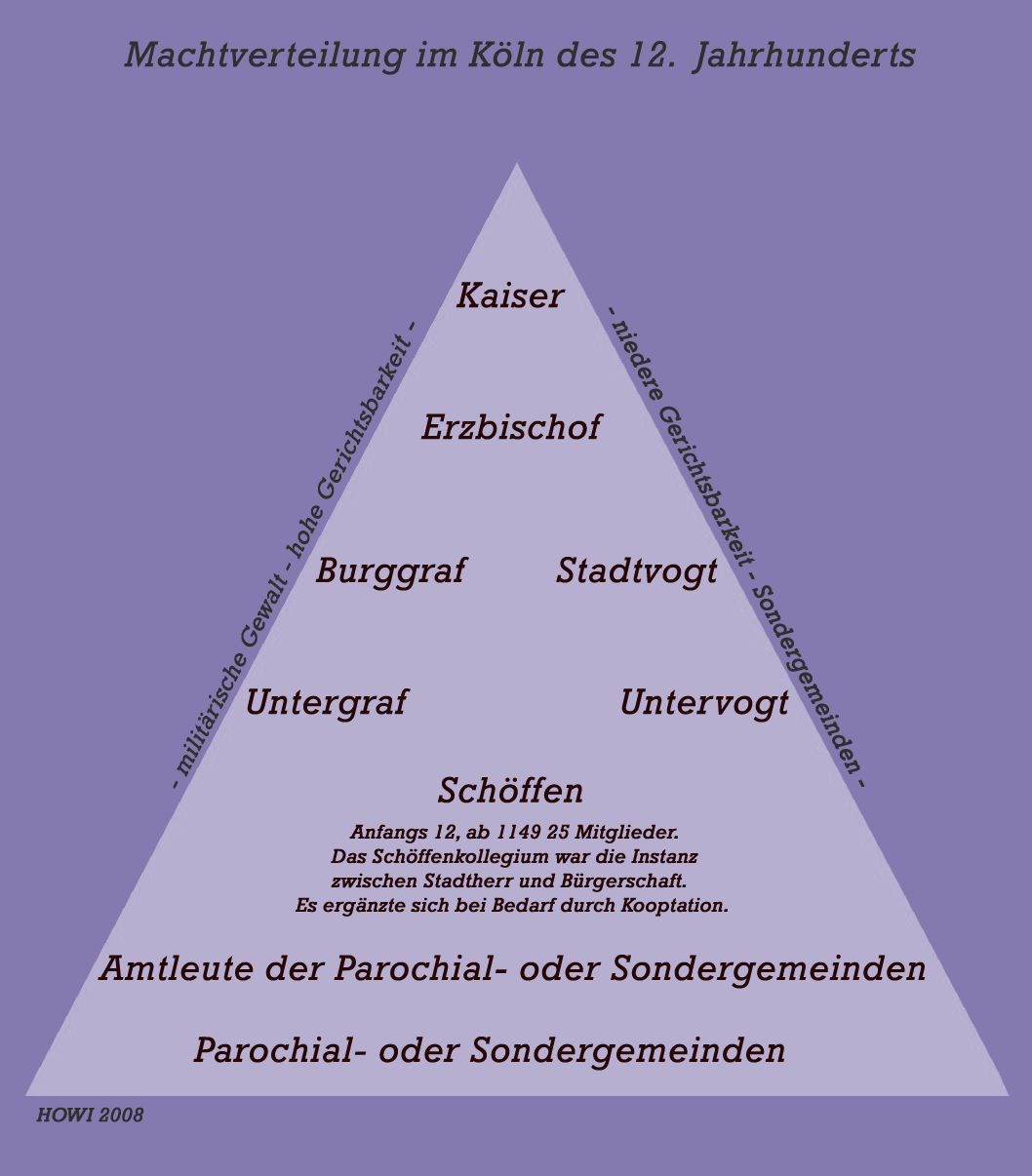
Diagram showing the distribution of power in Cologne during the 12th century, when the Richerzeche held significant influence.

Richerzeche was founded in the 12th Century in the Free Imperial City of Cologne as a secular brotherhood or a corporation of all the wealthy patricians, which gradually absorbed in their hands the direction of the city's government. They lost their power in the middle of the 14th century.
