= RheinCargo =

German railway company

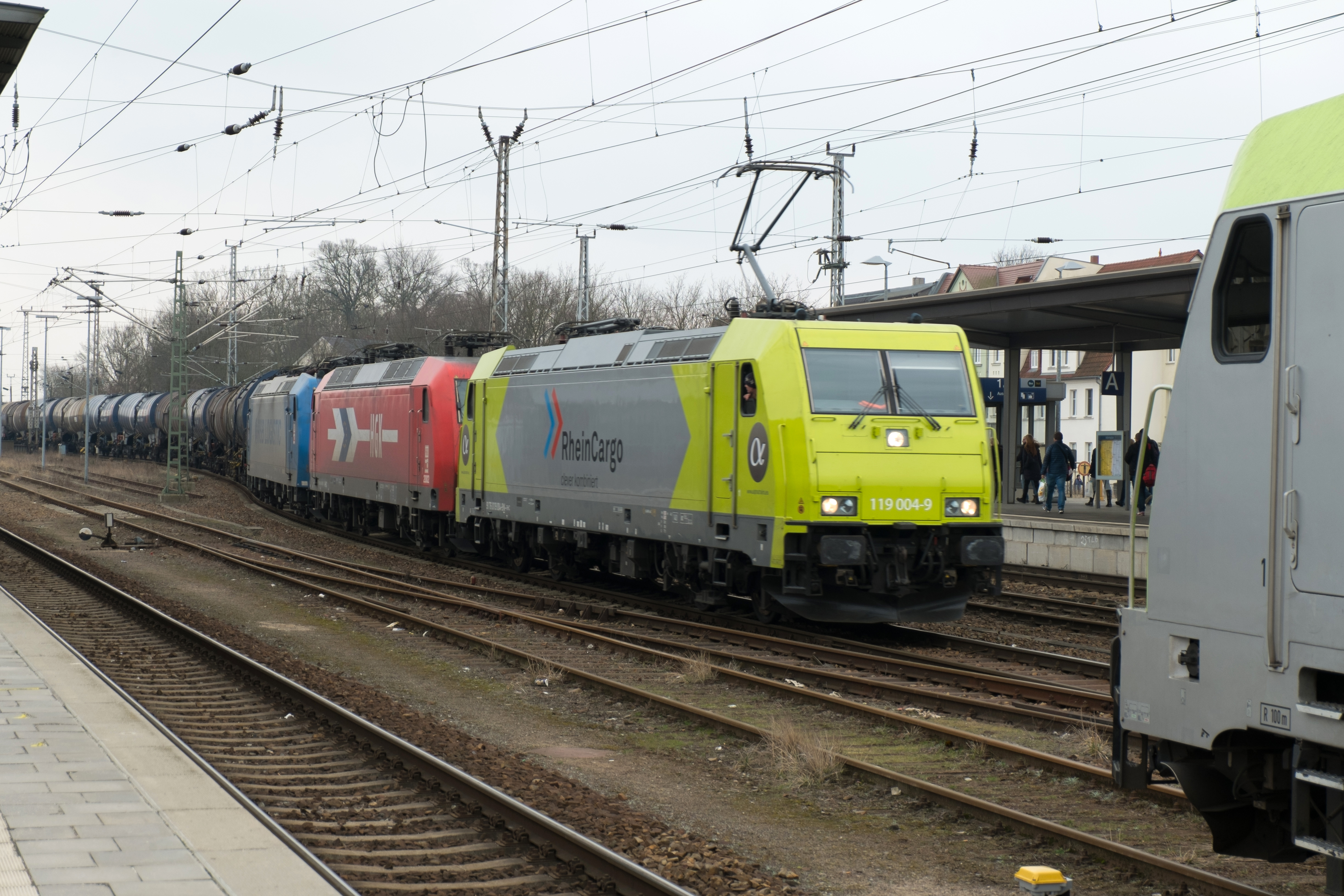
Locomotive of RheinCargo in Angermünde

RheinCargo GmbH & Co. KG (RheinCargo) operates one of the largest inland port operations in Europe (in Düsseldorf, Neuss, and Cologne) and is also active as a private railway transport company (EVU) in rail freight transport. It is a German joint venture of Häfen und Güterverkehr Köln AG (HGK) and Neuss-Düsseldorfer Häfen GmbH & Co. KG (NDH), each owning 50%. The company was established in 2012. It is headquartered in Neuss

The company owns six inland ports with a total turnover of 25.4 million tons (2018) on 560 hectares of land. These include four ports in Cologne (Godorf, Deutz, Niehl I, and Niehl II), the port in Neuss, and the Düsseldorf Harbor as well as the port in Düsseldorf-Reisholz. With around 90 own locomotives and around 700 freight cars, the company carries around 20 million tonnes of freight per year.

== Port operations ==
RheinCargo operates six different public inland ports in the cities of Neuss, Düsseldorf, and Cologne. RheinCargo offers various port services at all port locations and develops trimodal solutions together with or for its customers. The port infrastructure includes a total of 48 crane systems, with an average of 50 ship clearances per day (as of 2022). In addition to handling bulk cargo in the ports of RheinCargo, the handling of combined loading units also takes place.

== Locomotives ==
RheinCargo uses electric, diesel, and dual locomotives for its freight transport.

Many of the diesel locomotives were taken over by RheinCargo from HGK and NDH during the renaming process and were only repainted (owner identification, company logos), retaining the red HGK or Neusser Eisenbahn livery. Class 66 locomotives were repainted during the main inspection and have been in silver-gray livery since then, with the DE 67 omitted, so this locomotive retained its green-yellow livery, which dates back to the times of the former leasing company Ascendos Rail Leasing.
