= 2018 Cologne terrorist plot =

Foiled terrorist plot in Germany

The 2018 Cologne terrorist plot was foiled when, on 13 June 2018, police arrested Sief Allah H. in Cologne as he was manufacturing an explosive device which incorporated the highly toxic substance ricin. He was arrested for having breached the Kriegswaffenkontrollgesetz (war weapons control act).

== Suspect and investigation ==
Sief Allah H. migrated to Germany in 2016 from Tunisia. In December 2017 he reported his Tunisian passport as lost to German authorities. Authorities suspected that Sief Allah H. had travelled to conflict zones and tried to replace passports that might contain stamps or entry visas which might indicate terrorist activities. German authorities also asked their Tunisian counterparts for information on him and were told that he was suspected of being a follower of Islamic ultra-conservative Salafi ideology.

He was arrested on 13 June 2018. Police found more than 3000 castor bean seeds in his apartment and 84.3 milligrams of ricin in his apartment along with bomb components. The following Friday police had discovered that the suspect possessed the master key which gave access to further apartments in the same high-rise building and police searched those for dangerous items and substances. The chief of Germany's domestic intelligence agency, Hans-Georg Maaßen, said it was likely that a terrorist attack had been foiled.

Detectives from the German Public Prosecutor General (German: Generalbundesanwalt beim Bundesgerichtshof - BGA) and Federal Criminal Police Office conducted the investigation. By July 2018, investigators had found three mobile phones among the possessions of the suspect, one of which covers 9000 chat logs along with various instructions on how to make a bomb were found. The suspect had also acquired the means to transform castor beans into poison.

In the autumn of 2017, Sief Allah H. was in contact with members of Islamic State of Iraq and the Levant and they suggested an attack in Germany.

In April 2018, Sief Allah H. started to manufacture ricin. His wife provided assistance with payments through her bank accounts.

In July 2018, Yamin H., the 42-year-old wife of Sief Allah H. was apprehended. She was suspected of three counts of preparing a serious violent crime and assisting in the procurement of a biological weapon. According to the BGA, she and her husband wished to travel to Syria to join the Islamic State of Iraq and the Levant. In August 2017 she was unable to travel to Syria due to children from a previous marriage, so she bought a flight ticket to Istanbul for her husband.

On 1 August 2018, prosecutors charged Sief Allah H., who was in custody, with "planning a serious act of violence against the state" and membership in a terrorist organisation, and in March 2020, the Düsseldorf OLG court sentenced him to 10 years imprisonment.

== Aftermath ==
=== Political reactions ===
The interior minister of North Rhine-Westphalia Herbert Reul (CDU) stated that the potential danger the suspect posed was "relatively high". Reul also praised the professionalism of the police in Cologne.

== See also ==
- 2018 Cologne attack - the attack and hostage taking at Cologne station later the same year
- 2023 Cologne Cathedral bomb plot
