= Robert Görlinger =

German politician (1888–1954)

Member of the Bundestag
- In office 7 September 1949 – 10 February 1954

Personal details
- Born: 29 July 1888 Ensheim
- Died: 10 February 1954 (aged 65)
- Party: SPD

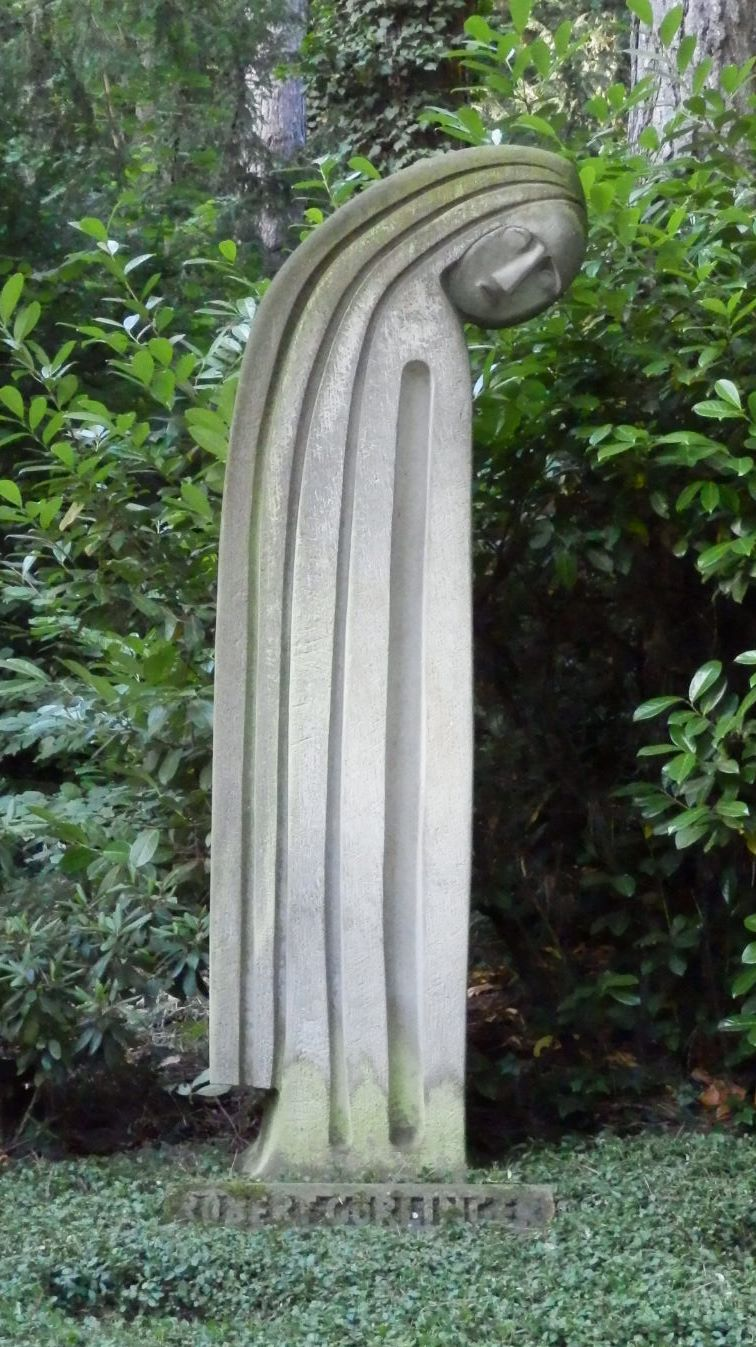
Grave of Robert Görlinger

Robert Görlinger (29 July 1888 – 10 February 1954) was a German politician of the Social Democratic Party (SPD) and member of the German Bundestag.

== Life ==
In 1946/47 he was a member of the two Appointed State Parliaments of North Rhine-Westphalia, where he was deputy chairman of the SPD parliamentary group, and subsequently a member of the first elected state parliament until his resignation on 3 September 1949. He was a member of the German Bundestag from the first Bundestag elections in 1949 until his death. He had entered parliament via the North Rhine-Westphalia state list.

== Literature ==
Herbst, Ludolf; Jahn, Bruno (2002). Vierhaus, Rudolf (ed.). Biographisches Handbuch der Mitglieder des Deutschen Bundestages. 1949–2002 [Biographical Handbook of the Members of the German Bundestag. 1949–2002] (in German). München: De Gruyter - De Gruyter Saur. p. 1715. ISBN 978-3-11-184511-1.
