= Torsten Burmester =

German politician (born 1963)

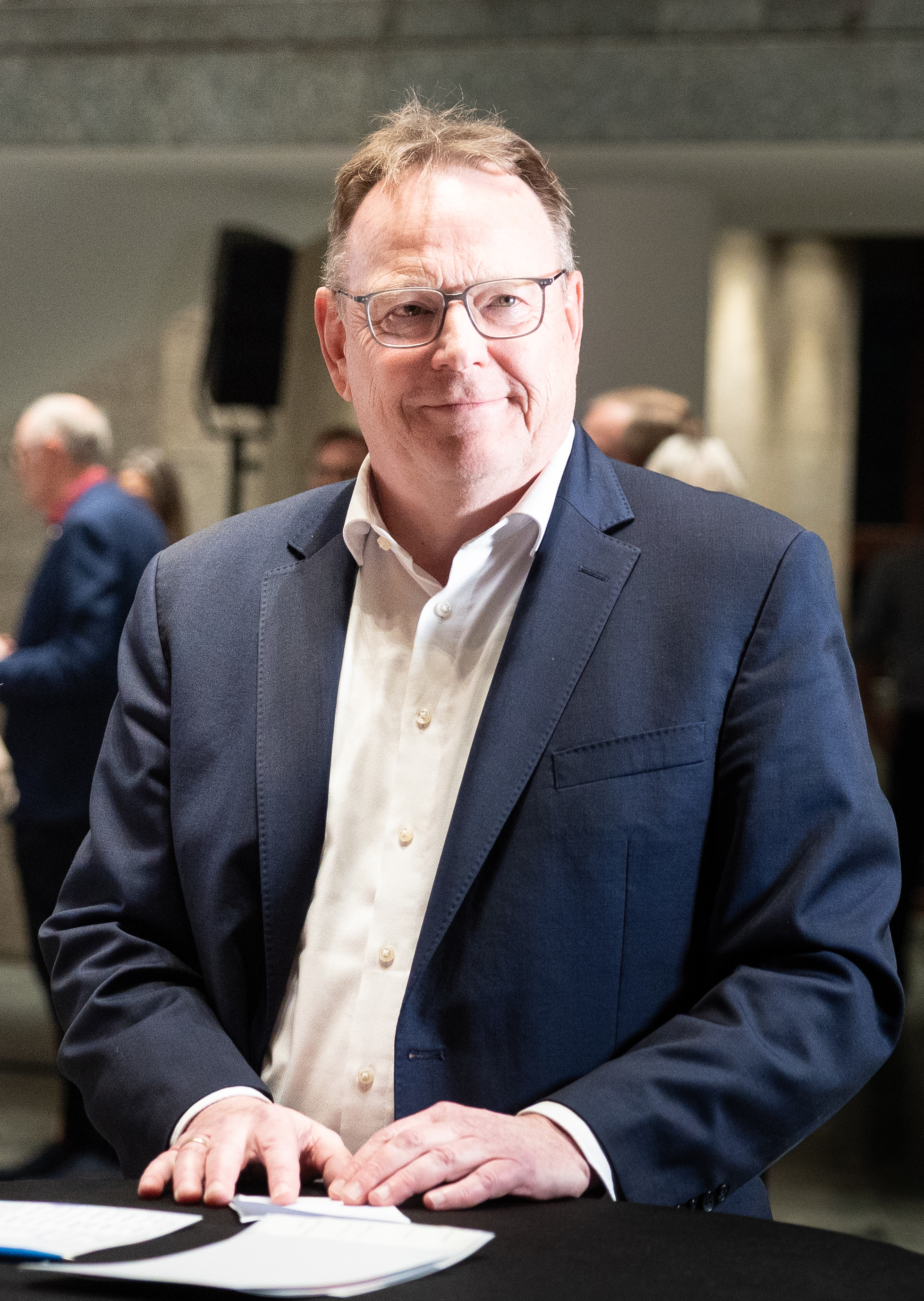
- Burmester in 2025

Lord Mayor of Cologne
- Incumbent
- Assumed office 1 November 2025
- Preceded by: Henriette Reker

Personal details
- Born: 15 January 1963 (age 63) Uchte, Lower Saxony, West Germany
- Party: Social Democratic
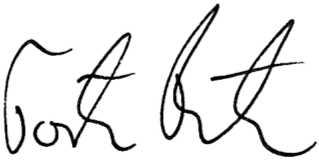
- Signature

Torsten Burmester (born 15 January 1963) is a German politician and member of the Social Democratic Party of Germany (SPD), as well as a former sports official, and ministry official.

From 1 February 2022 to December 2024, Burmester served as CEO of the German Olympic Sports Confederation (DOSB) and was a member of the delegation leadership for the 2024 Summer Olympics in Paris.

Since 1 November 2025, he has been the Lord Mayor of the City of Cologne.
