= 2018 Cologne attack =

Hostage crisis in North Rhine-Westphalia, Germany

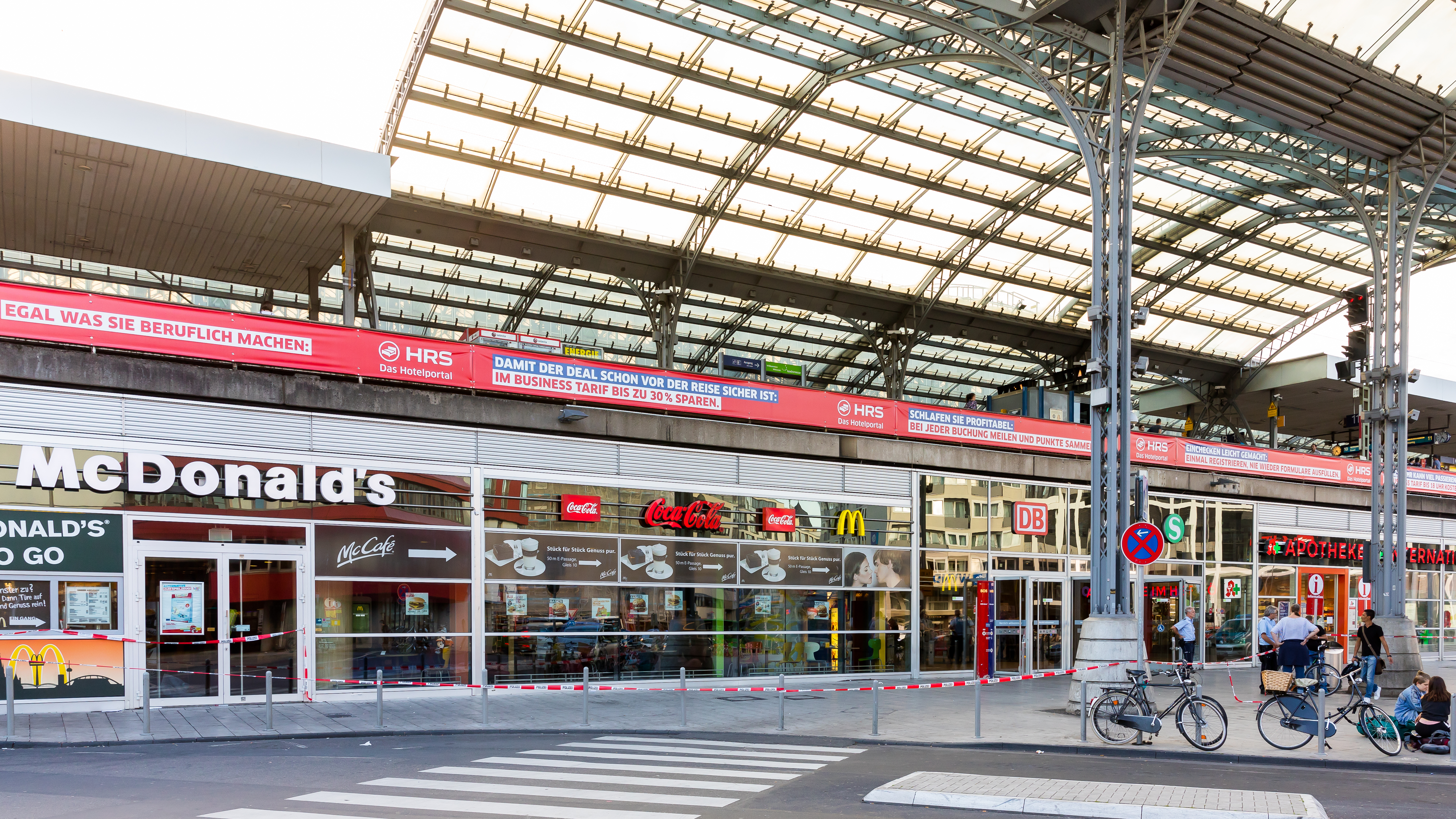
- The McDonald's (centre) and pharmacy (far right) at Köln Hbf. one day after the attack
- Location: Köln Hauptbahnhof; Cologne, North Rhine-Westphalia, Germany
- Date: 15 October 2018; 8 years ago c. 12:30 – 14:59 (CEST)
- Attack type: Arson, hostage-taking
- Weapons: Molotov cocktail, gasoline, pneumatic pistol, cooking stove cartridges
- Deaths: 0
- Injuries: 3 (2 by smoke or gasoline inhalation, 1 by burns)
- Perpetrator: Mohammad Abo R.

On 15 October 2018, an arson attack and subsequent hostage-taking occurred at the central railway station of Cologne, Germany. 55-year-old Mohammad Abo R. threw a molotov cocktail inside a fast food restaurant before engaging in a stand-off with police at a nearby pharmacy, where Abo R. threatened to set a hostage employee on fire. While Abo R. put various flammable items on the employee, SEK non-fatally shot the perpetrator in the head.

Abo R., a Syrian refugee, had claimed allegiance to the Islamic State during the attack, but a two-month investigation found no verifiable ties to the organisation. Abo R. was criminally charged for attempted murder, but following years of medical examinations, he was judged to be unfit for trial in December 2024 due to irreparable brain damage sustained during the attack and subsequent coma.

== Incident ==
At around 12:30, Mohammad Abo R. arrived on Breslauer Platz at Cologne railway station's north side and entered a McDonald's restaurant with a backpack and a rolling suitcase. In the restaurant, he sat down at a table, drew a pistol (later identified as a pneumatic weapon), and spilled a flammable liquid on the floor. Shortly thereafter, he took a Molotov cocktail from his suitcase, ignited it and set the floor of the restaurant on fire.

The fire ignited the clothes of a 14-year-old girl, who ran out of the restaurant. Passersby quickly extinguished the girl's burning clothes, who, despite the rapid reaction of the passersby, sustained severe burns to her legs. Surprised by the triggered fire sprinkler system, Abo R. had meanwhile fled the restaurant and entered a pharmacy across the floor, where he took an employee hostage using an airsoft pistol.

At 12:45, the first emergency calls reached the police. The police quickly evacuated the station and cordoned off the surrounding area. On the phone, the perpetrator stated his demands: Free passage to Syria, the release of a Tunisian woman, and the return of his suitcase and bag from the McDonald's. He told passersby that he was a member of "Daesh".

A two-hour standoff led to no peaceful solution. At 14:55, a SEK team detonated two stun grenades, stormed the pharmacy, and shot the perpetrator, who was still armed with his pistol. Three police officers fired a total of six rounds at Abo R., hitting him in the head and abdomen. The hostage was carried from the pharmacy and handed over to paramedics. Abo R. was dragged by the SEK Members to the square in front of the pharmacy, where CPR was applied and his wounds were treated by police medics.

Cologne main station was completely locked down until 18:00. Thousands of people, many travelers among them, gathered around the station.

== Victims ==
14-year-old Lika M., from neighbouring Hennef, was seriously injured by burns to her legs. Her right foot was caught on fire in the gasoline puddle, causing 10 percent of her skin to be burned. She was treated in a children's hospital in Cologne. Eight surgeries and two skin transplants later she was able to leave the hospital in December 2018. Doctors expected her to make a full recovery. Her family received €200,000 in donations from citizens and a benefit concert in November 2018.

The 37-year-old hostage was treated in a clinic after the incident. She suffered a shock and a gasoline poisoning. She was able to leave the hospital two day later.

The fire department reported another victim. This person suffered smoke inhalation, but was able to leave the hospital on the same day.

== Perpetrator ==
Mohammad Abo R. had arrived in Europe during the 2015 European migrant crisis from Syria. Syrian government records listed Abo R. as having been arrested numerous times between 1994 and 2004 for smuggling, possession of forged currency, and theft. Abo R. claimed to have been imprisoned for several years as a political dissident and that he experienced torture through the security service under the Assad governments.

Abo R. initially lived in the Czech Republic, where he filed an asylum application and was again investigated for fraud offences. He then moved to Germany and filed an asylum application in March 2015, claiming political prosecution. Under the Dublin Regulation, the German authorities should have expelled him to the Czech Republic, but they did not do so. He lived in a flat opposite of a refugee accommoation in Neuehrenfeld and was given permission to stay in Germany until 2021. His son and a brother also lived in Germany, with his wife, who was still in Syria, having been rejected for residency.

Abo R. was known to the police. He had been charged 13 times since 2016, the charges included drug possession, theft, threat, fraud, forgery, and trespassing. He was never convicted. He also twice contacted police over ISIS concerns, once claiming in 2016 that they had hacked his Facebook account and later accusing another Syrian refugee of membership in 2017; both cases were deemed unreliable for lack of evidence. He had an ongoing trial for fraud since June 2018 at the time of the attack. Abo R. was in psychiatric treatment since 2017 and consumed marijuana and other psychotropic drugs, with his family attesting that he had an addiction to pills. He was evicted from his home the day of the attack, telling his landlord that he would go to the railway station to move to Hamburg.

=== Wounds ===
Abo R. was wounded by six shots. Five projectiles struck him in the upper body and one projectile hit him in the head. He was carried by the SEK officers from the pharmacy to the square in front of the pharmacy where he was resuscitated by the officers and a GSG 9 doctor. After successful resuscitation, Abo R. was taken to the University Hospital of Cologne, where he underwent emergency surgery. He was later transferred to intensive care. On Tuesday, his condition remained critical. In a press conference on Wednesday, the police announced that the perpetrator was no longer in a life threatening condition, but was in a coma.

Two months after the incident, Abo R. woke up from the coma. Due to the gunshot wounds, Abo R. was paralyzed on one side and required nutrition through a feeding tube, with bullet fragments remaining his skull. According to a medical report, he was not able to take part in a court trial in his current condition. In June 2019, his pre-trial detention was suspended for six months and he was transferred to a specialist neurological clinic. Experts assumed that Abo R.'s stay at the clinic will allow him to recover to the point where he can participate in the trial; Abo R. was still in treatment in October 2020.

== Investigation ==
In the McDonald's, the rolling suitcase and briefcase of the perpetrator were examined and declared safe by EOD Operators. The suitcase contained Molotov cocktails and several gas cartridges, modified with steel balls to act as improvised explosive devices, while the briafcase had containers with flammable liquid. In the pharmacy, further containers with flammable liquid, additional IEDs, an airsoft pistol and an identity document were recovered.

In the beginning, police stated that they could not rule out a terror attack. Der Spiegel noted that the perpetrator used the term "Daesh", the common Arabic acronym for ISIS, which the terror group considers derogatory. Investigators assumed witnesses had misheard him saying "Dawlah", the accepted name for ISIS by its members. ISIS members typically leave behind a pledge of allegiance to ISIS for an attack, but the scrawled message in his flat was only a repetition of the shahada. ISIS also did not claim the attack for itself. Ultimately no connection between Mohammed Abo R. and terrorism was found and the case ruled non terrorism related. Though it was first thought that the gasoline was related to the attack or in preparation for others, it was found that Abo R. had used the fuel as a crude inhalant drug.

In the evening of the same day, R.'s apartment was stormed and searched by the police. This happened especially in view of a possible terrorist attack and other perpetrators. The flat was in a state of disrepair and had the electricity turned off due to unpaid bills. Large quantities of gasoline and Arabic writings on the walls were found in the apartment. The characters were not related to Islamism or ISIS. Multiple electronic devices were seized in the apartment including two mobile phones.

After terrorism was ruled out, it was determined that Abo R. suffered from mental health issues. They found that he had been in psychotherapy since 2017 and was taking medication to combat depression. He was also suffering from gambling and drug addiction.

== Legal proceedings ==
The Cologne prosecutor's office charged Mohammed Abo R. with two counts of attempted murder, aggravated battery and hostage-taking. The indictment was read to him shortly after his awakening at the hospital. On 16 October 2018, the Public Prosecutor General took over investigations because there were "sufficient indications for a radical Islamist background." During the investigation no evidence for a terror related attack were found. In December 2018 the Public Prosecutor General gave the case back to the Cologne prosecutor's office. In December 2020, the case was temporarily suspended, citing the perpetrator's bad recovery due to remaining partial paralysis, which resulted in him being unable to sit in a wheelchair for longer periods of time. Additionally, though conscious, he showed little cognitive ability.

Following several examinations by neurosurgeons and neurologists, the state prosecution dropped the case against Abo R. in December 2024. His lawyer called the decision "long overdue" and commented that Abo R. still had "very limited motor skills" and was a permanent patient at a care facility in Porz since his hospital discharge.

== See also ==
- 2018 Cologne terrorist plot a foiled plot earlier the same year
