= Jürgen Roters =

German politician

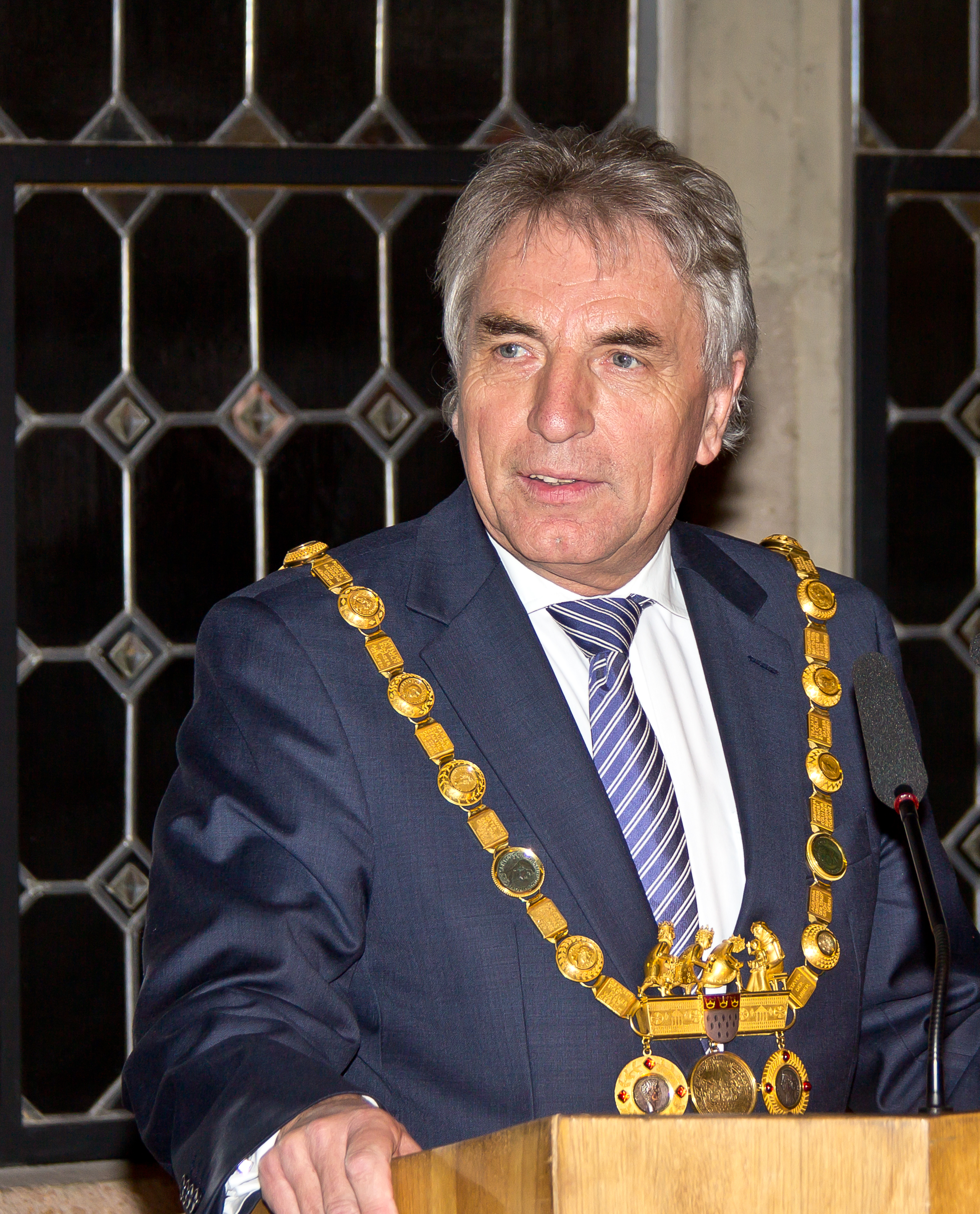
Roters in 2012

Jürgen Roters (born 15 January 1949 in Coesfeld) is a German politician and member of the Social Democratic Party of Germany (SPD), as well as a former middle-distance runner. He was mayor of Cologne from 2009 to 2015. Roters studied law from 1968 until 1974, is married and has three children.
