= Cologne City Hall =

City hall in Cologne, Germany

Cologne Town Hall
- Rathaus Köln
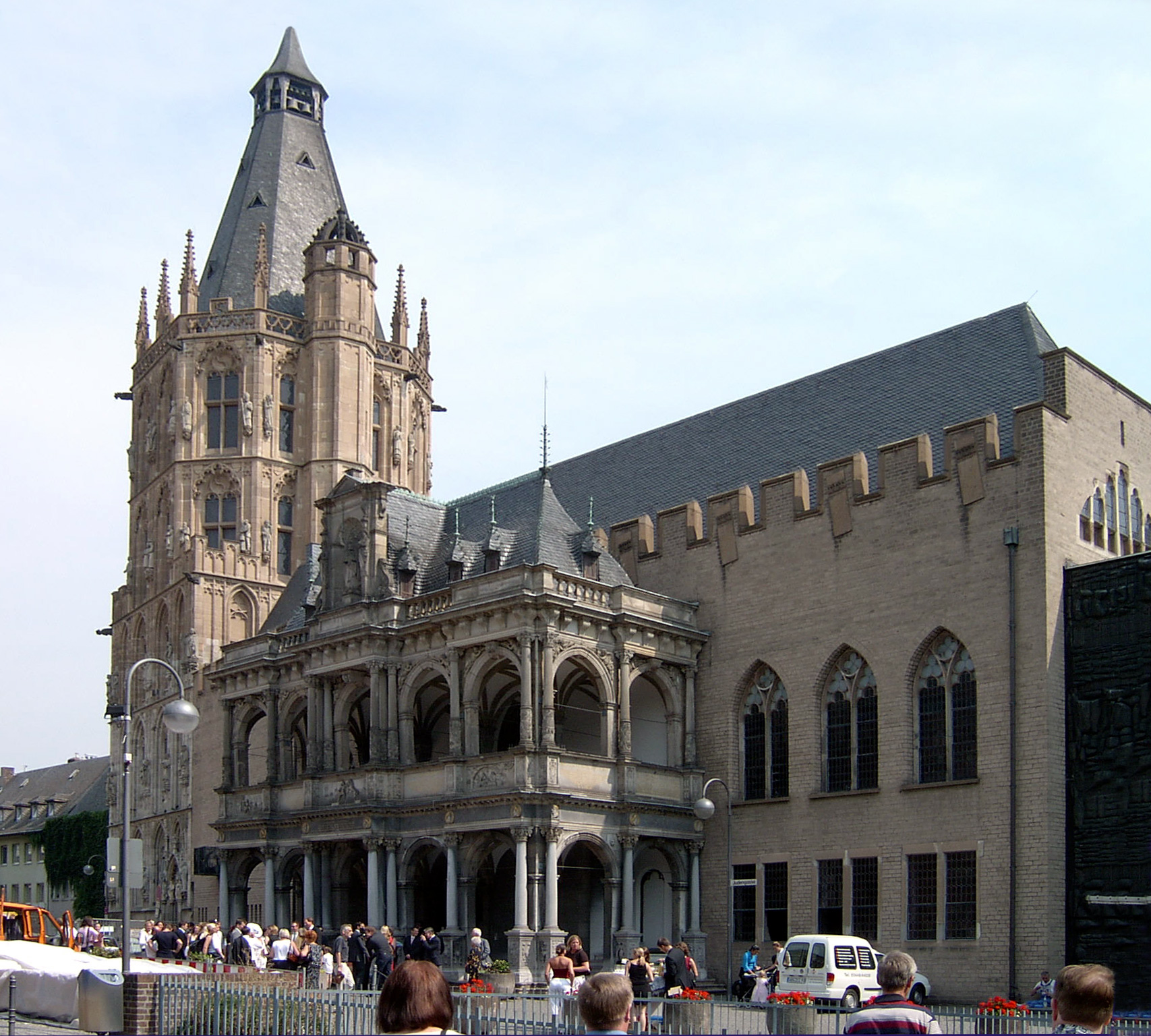
- The main frontage of the town hall in October 2004

General information
- Type: City hall
- Architectural style: Medieval style
- Location: Cologne, Germany
- Coordinates: 50.9380°N 6.9593°E
- Completed: 1330 (Saalbau)

Height
- Height: 61 metres (200 ft)

Cologne Town Hall (German: Rathaus Köln) is a municipal building in Cologne, in western Germany, standing on Rathausplatz. It is located off Hohe Straße in the district of Innenstadt and accommodates the city council and offices of the Mayor of Cologne. The complex consists of several structures, added successively in varying architectural styles: they include the 14th century historic town hall, the 15th century Gothic style tower, the 16th century Renaissance style loggia and cloister (the Löwenhof), and the 20th century modern style atrium (the Piazzetta). The so-called Spanischer Bau is an extension on Rathausplatz but not directly connected with the main building.

== History ==
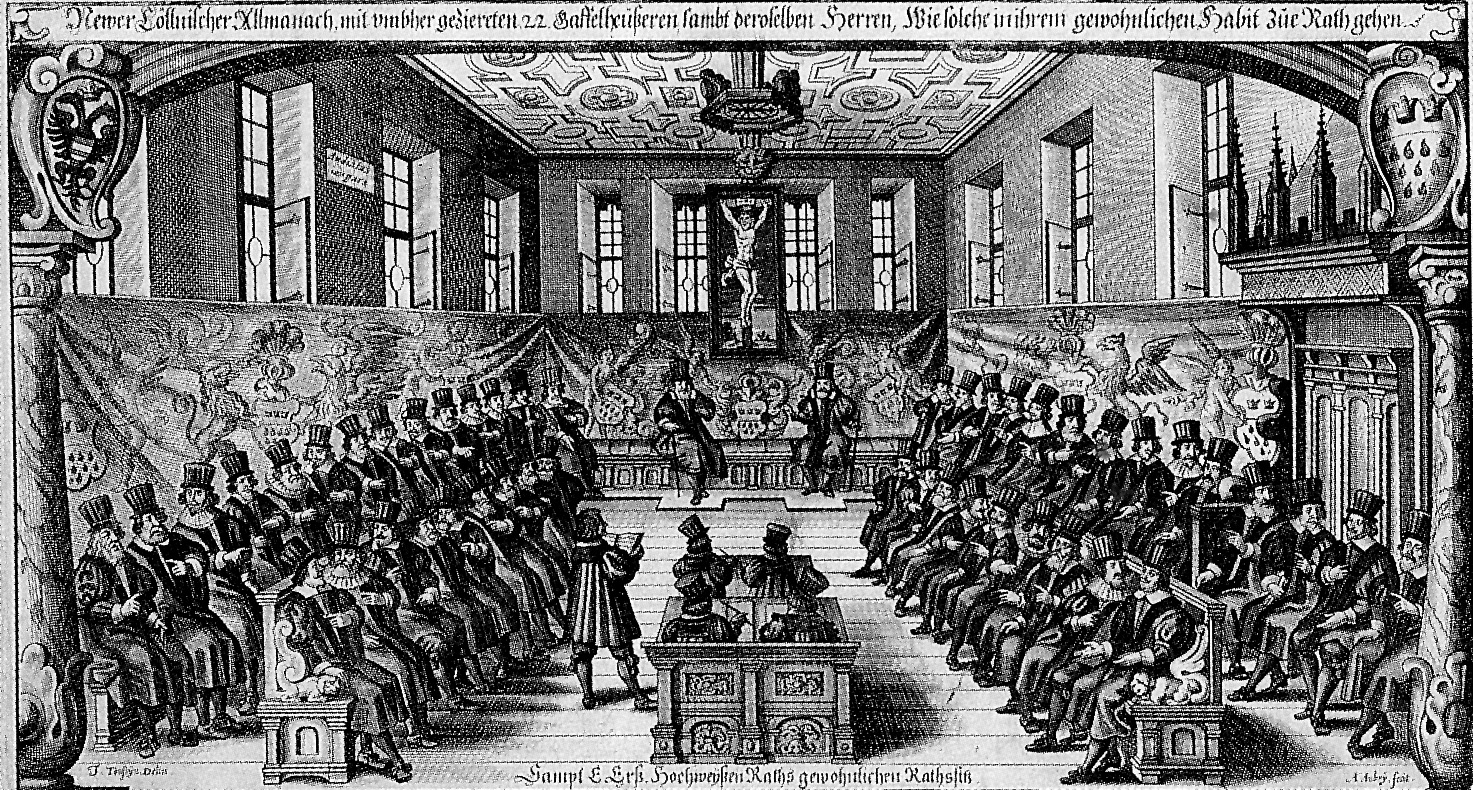
Cologne Senate of 1655

The building is located on the site of the former Ancient Roman Praetorium, which until the year 475 was seat of the Roman Governor of Germania Inferior. Merovingian kings are known to have used the praetorium as a regia until 754, however the building was ultimately destroyed by an earthquake in the late 8th century.

The oldest part of the complex is the Saalbau (i.e. roofed hall building), which replaced a previous Romanesque style council building of 1135 on the same location. The Saalbau was completed in 1330. The hall recalls the Hansasaal, which measured 30 meters (98 ft) long by 7.6 metres (25 ft) wide and up to 9.58 metres (31.4 ft) high and was the core of the entire complex. It was named after the Hanseatic League, which held an important summit in it on 19 November 1367. Noteworthy are stone figures of the Nine Worthies, whose example the councillors were expected to follow.

The Gothic style Ratsturm (council tower) was commissioned by the local guilds on 19 August 1406. It was built between 1407 and 1414 and reaches a height of 61 metres (200 ft). It consists of five storeys and the so-called Ratskeller (council cellar). Its purpose was mainly to store documents, but one of the lower floors also housed the Senatssaal (i.e. hall of the Cologne Senate). The tower – including the many exterior stone figures – has been restored entirely. The bells in the tower play tunes four times daily.

The Rathauslaube – as the Renaissance style loggia is called – is a replacement for a previous loggia on the same location. The loggia consists of a 2-storey, five-bay long and two-bay deep arcade, which functions as entrance to the main hall (Hansasaal) at ground level, and as balcony for the main hall on the upper floor. The balcony was used for public speeches throughout the year. The council initiated a lengthy design process in 1557, which lasted until 1562. In July 1567 the council approved the design by Wilhelm Vernukken from Kalkar, with construction lasting from 1569 to 1573.

During the allied bombing of Colgne, part of the Second World War, much of the complex was destroyed except for the front portion and part of the tower, the remaining part being rebuilt in modern style. The Piazzetta, which has been likened to a small piazza, forms an atrium which was built during the postwar restoration of the historic town hall.

The Spanischer Bau was built on the northwestern side of Rathausplatz in the years 1608 to 1615. The city council commissioned the originally Dutch Renaissance style building for meetings and celebrations. The name emerged in reference to Spanish delegates at the building during the time of the Thirty Years' War (1618–1648). However it was not in official use before the 19th century. After having been heavily damaged in 1942, the building was completely rebuilt in 1953.

== Gallery ==
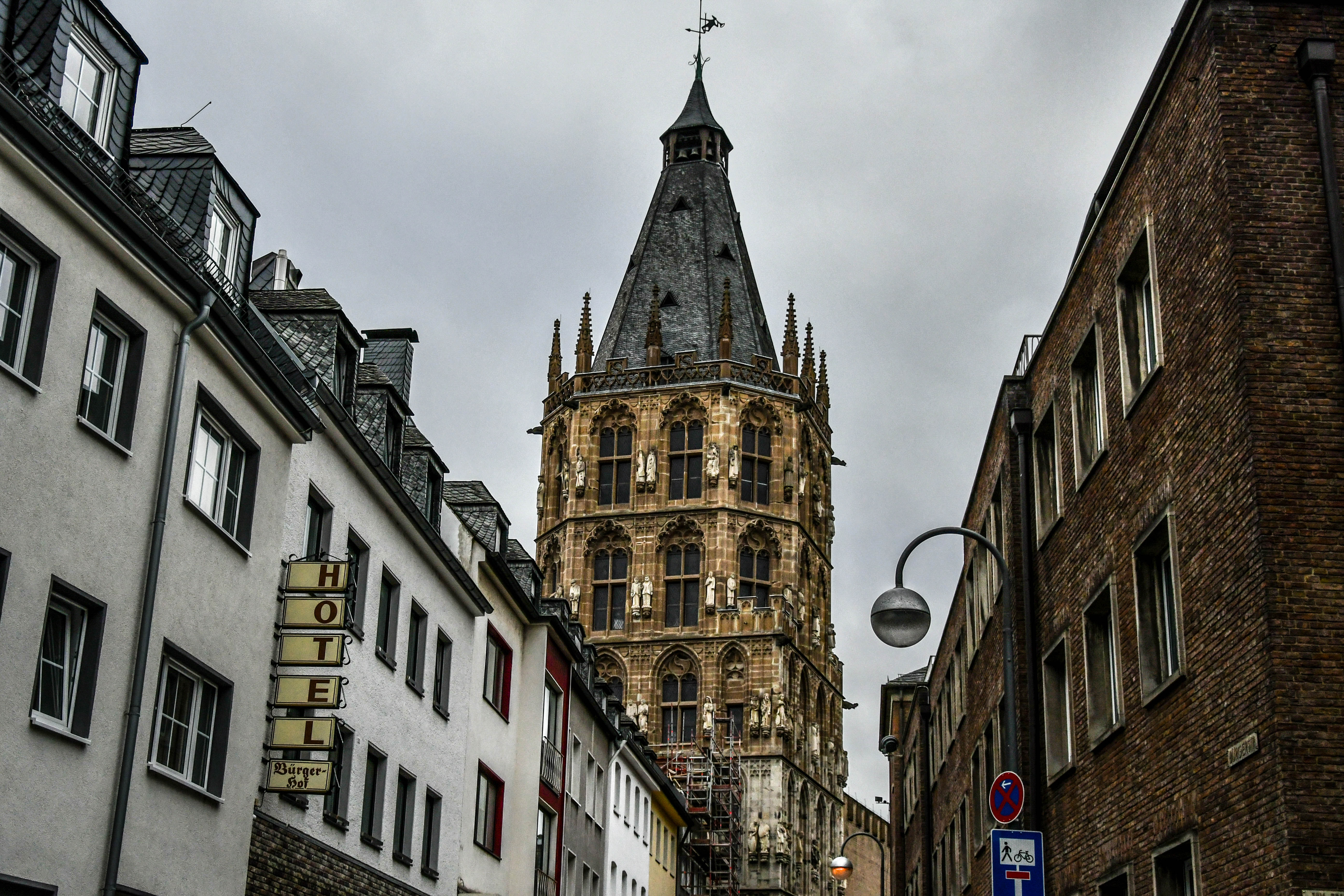
View with the tower prominent

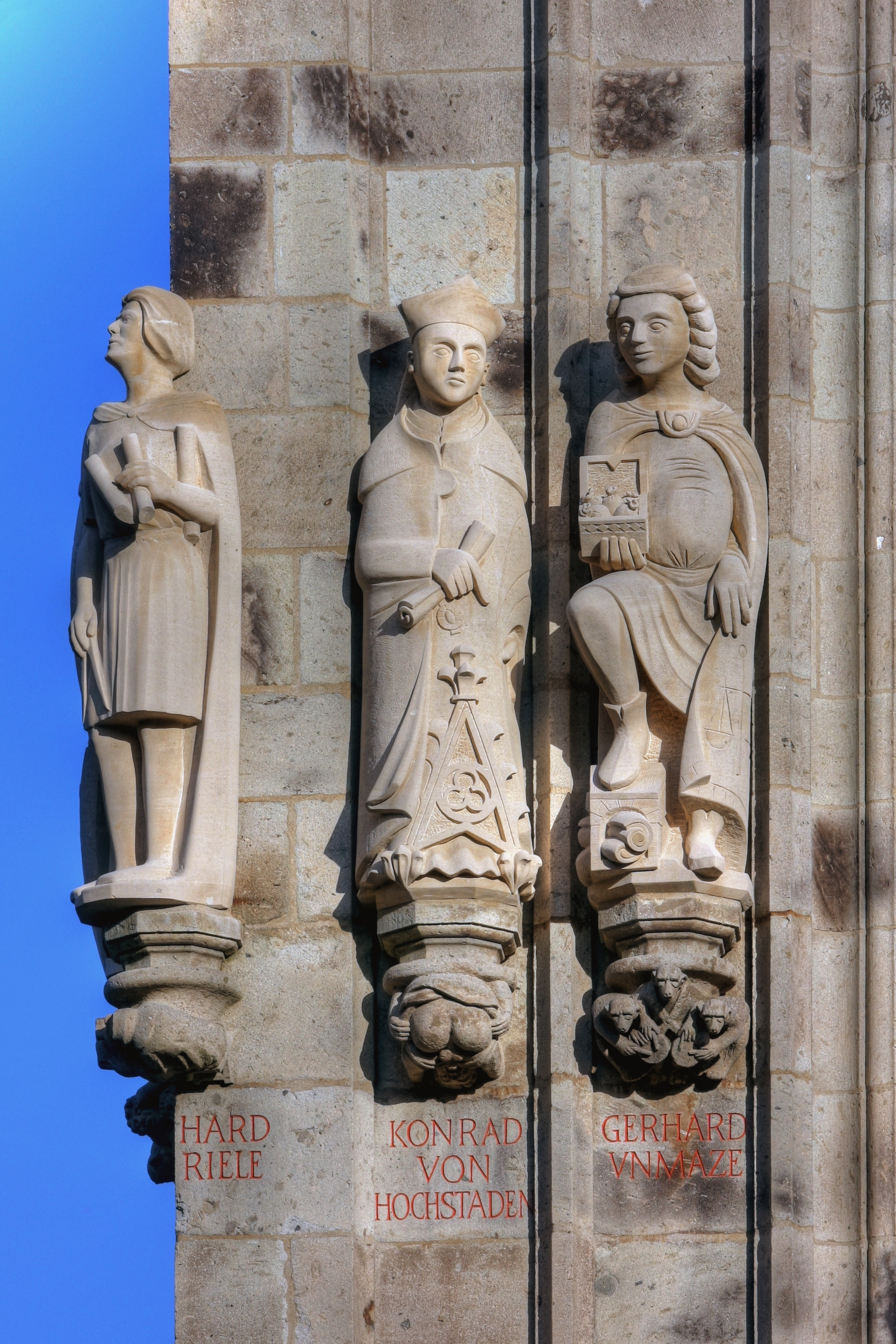
Konrad von Hochstaden statue

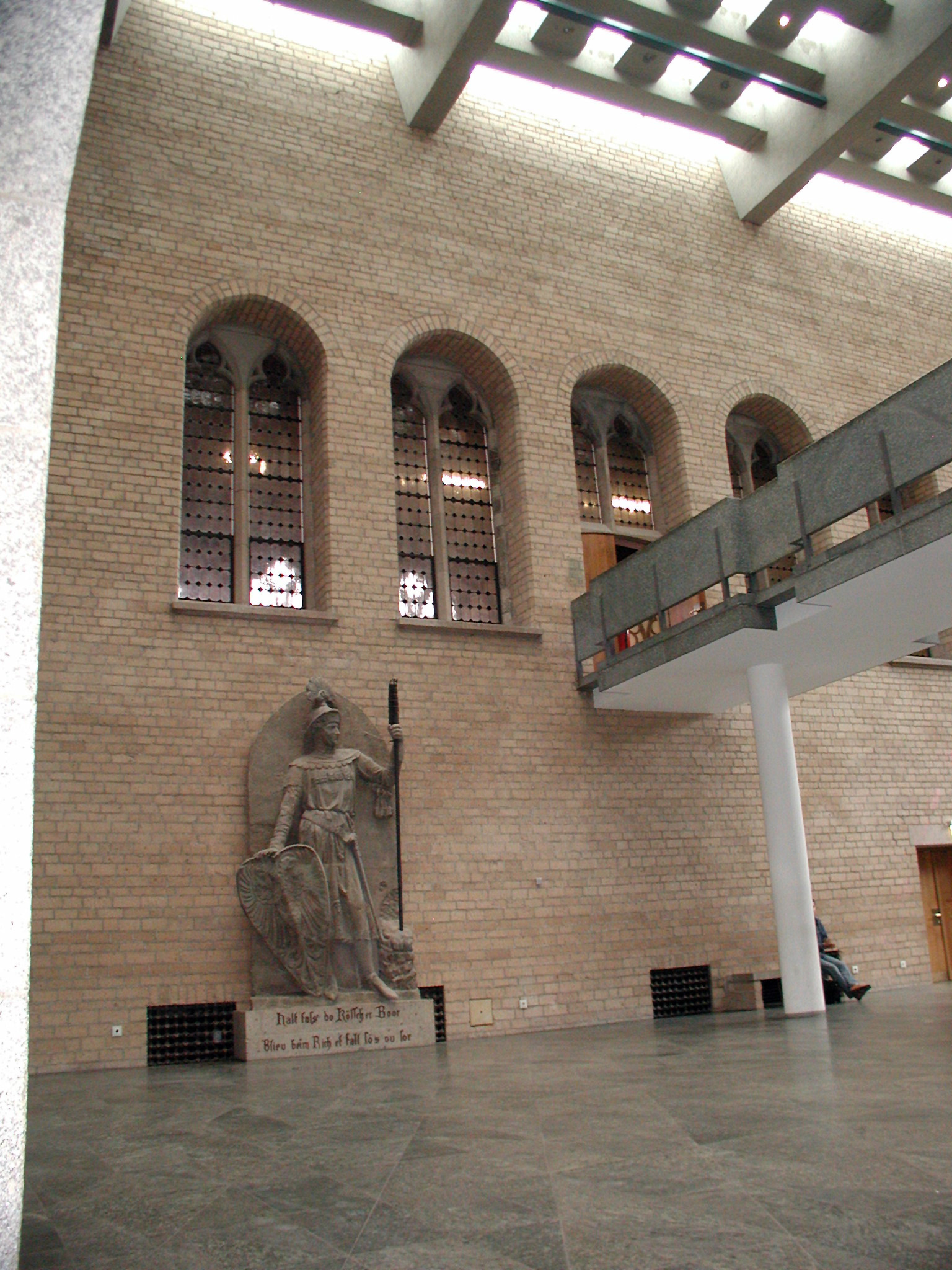
View of Saalbau from the Piazzetta

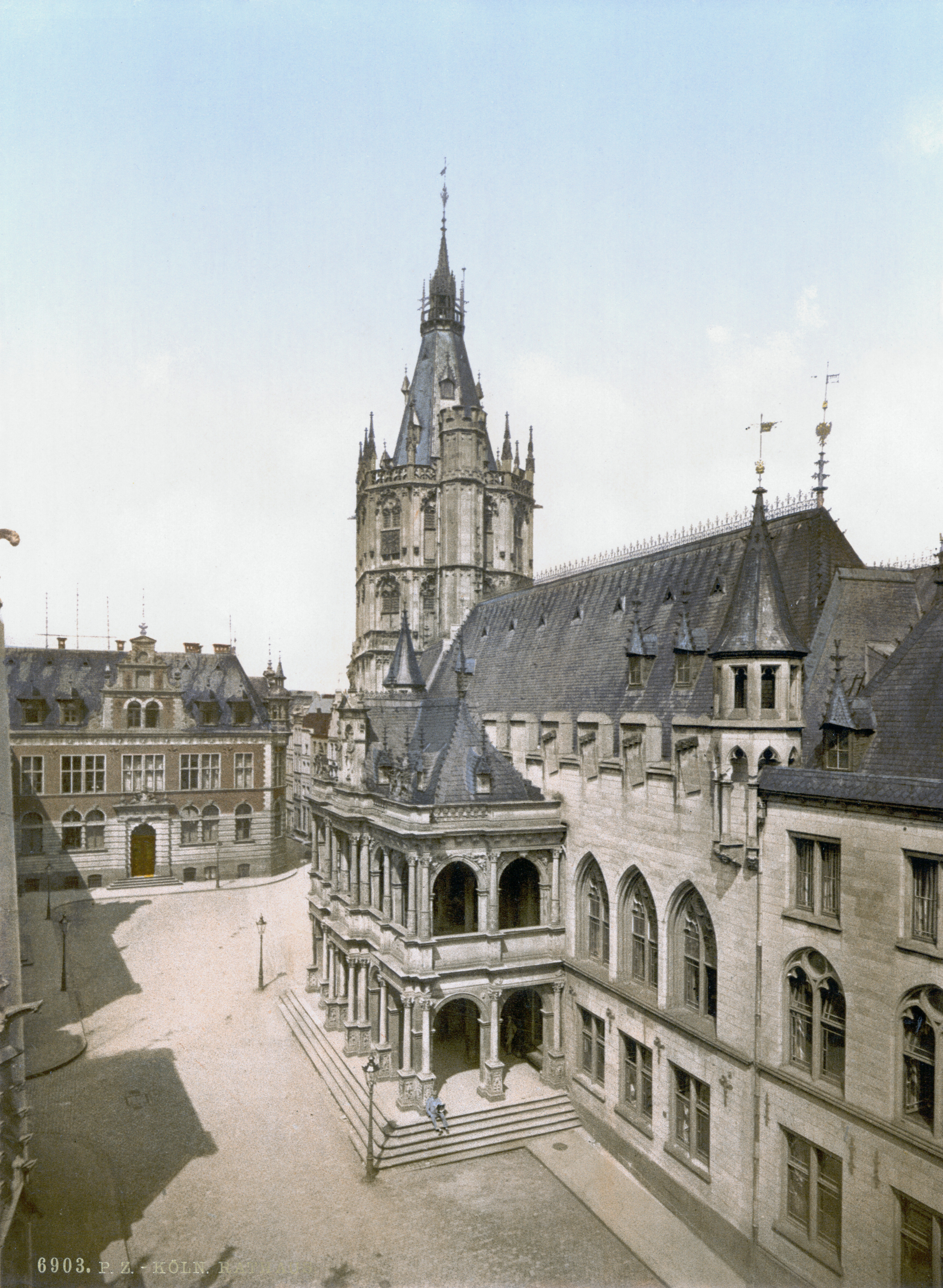
Cologne City Hall around 1900; the Loggia visible in the centre, Saalbau in centre right and Tower in the background.
