= Timeline of Düsseldorf =

The following is a timeline of the history of Düsseldorf, Germany.

== Prior to 19th century ==
- 1186 – Counts of Berg in power.
- 1285 – St. Sebastianus Bruderschaft Kaiserswerth (militia) formed.
- 1288 – Town privileges granted by Adolf VIII of Berg.
- 1316 – St.-Sebastianus-Schützenvereins Düsseldorf (militia) established.
- 1385 – Residence of the Counts of Berg established in Düsseldorf.
- 1567 – Rathhaus built.
- 1609 – Residence of the Electoral Palatinate relocates to Düsseldorf from Heidelberg.
- 1629 – Church of St. Andrew built.
- 1684 – Evangelishche Kirche built.
- 1710 – Electoral palace remodelled.
- 1716
  - Residence of the Electoral Palatinate relocates to Heidelberg.
  - Neustadt laid out (approximate date).
- 1760 – Jagerhof (electors' hunting lodge) built.
- 1762 – Art Academy founded.
- 1767 – Hofgarten laid out.
- 1774 – School of Law established (approximate date).
- 1787 – Karlstadt laid out.
- 1794 – Town besieged by French forces.
- 1800 – Musik-Academie established.

== 19th century ==
- 1802 - Fortifications demolished.
- 1804 – Kastanienallee laid out.
- 1805
  - Town becomes capital of Grand Duchy of Berg.
  - Palace art collection relocates to Munich.
- 1806 – French in power.
- 1812 – Breidenbacher Hof in business.
- 1813 – Hof-Garten expanded.
- 1815
  - Prussians in power.
  - Engelbert Schramm becomes mayor.
- 1818 – Lower Rhenish Music Festival held.
- 1819 – New Kunstakademie Düsseldorf founded as Königlich Preußische Kunstakademie (Royal Prussian Academy of Art); Dusselthal Asylum established.
- 1829 – Artists' Society for the Rhinelands and Westphalia (Kunstverein für die Rheinlande und Westphalen) founded.
- 1838 – Bergisch-Märkische railway station opens.
- 1841 – Düsseldorf–Elberfeld railway constructed.
- 1845 – Cologne-Minden railway station opens.
- 1846 – Ducal palace restored.
- 1852
  - August: Singing festival held.
  - Population: 31,000.
- 1861 – Malkasten artists' club established.
- 1864 – Düsseldorfer Symphoniker (orchestra) active.
- 1867 – Galerie Paffrath in business.

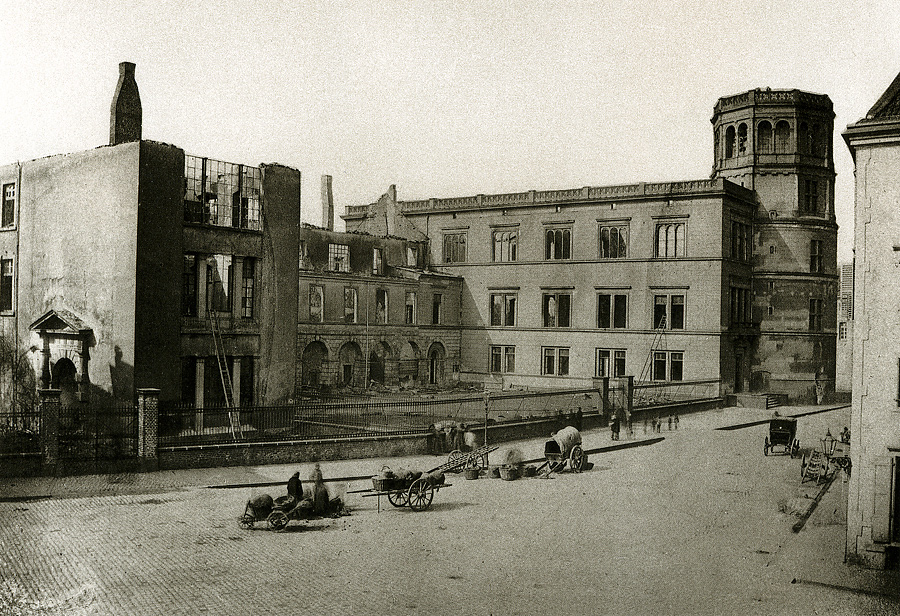
Palace ruins after the 1872 fire

- 1872 – Electoral palace burns down.
- 1875
  - Church of St. John built.
  - City Theatre opens.
- 1876
  - Trams begin operating.
  - Zoological Gardens established.
- 1877 – Rhenish railway station built.
- 1879 – Düsseldorf-Derendorf–Dortmund Süd railway, House of the Rhenish Estates, and Academy of Art building constructed.
- 1881 – Kunsthalle built.
- 1884 – Düsseldorf Exchange founded.
- 1885
  - City public library established.
  - Population: 115,190.
- 1891 – Düsseldorf Central Station opens.
- 1893 – Mannesmann (manufacturer) relocates to Düsseldorf.
- 1895 – Population: 175,985.
- 1896 – Industrial art museum built.
- 1898 – Road bridge constructed, carries the electric tram-line to "Crefeld".
- 1899 – Apollo-Theater opens.
- 1900 – Peek & Cloppenburg in business.

== 20th century ==
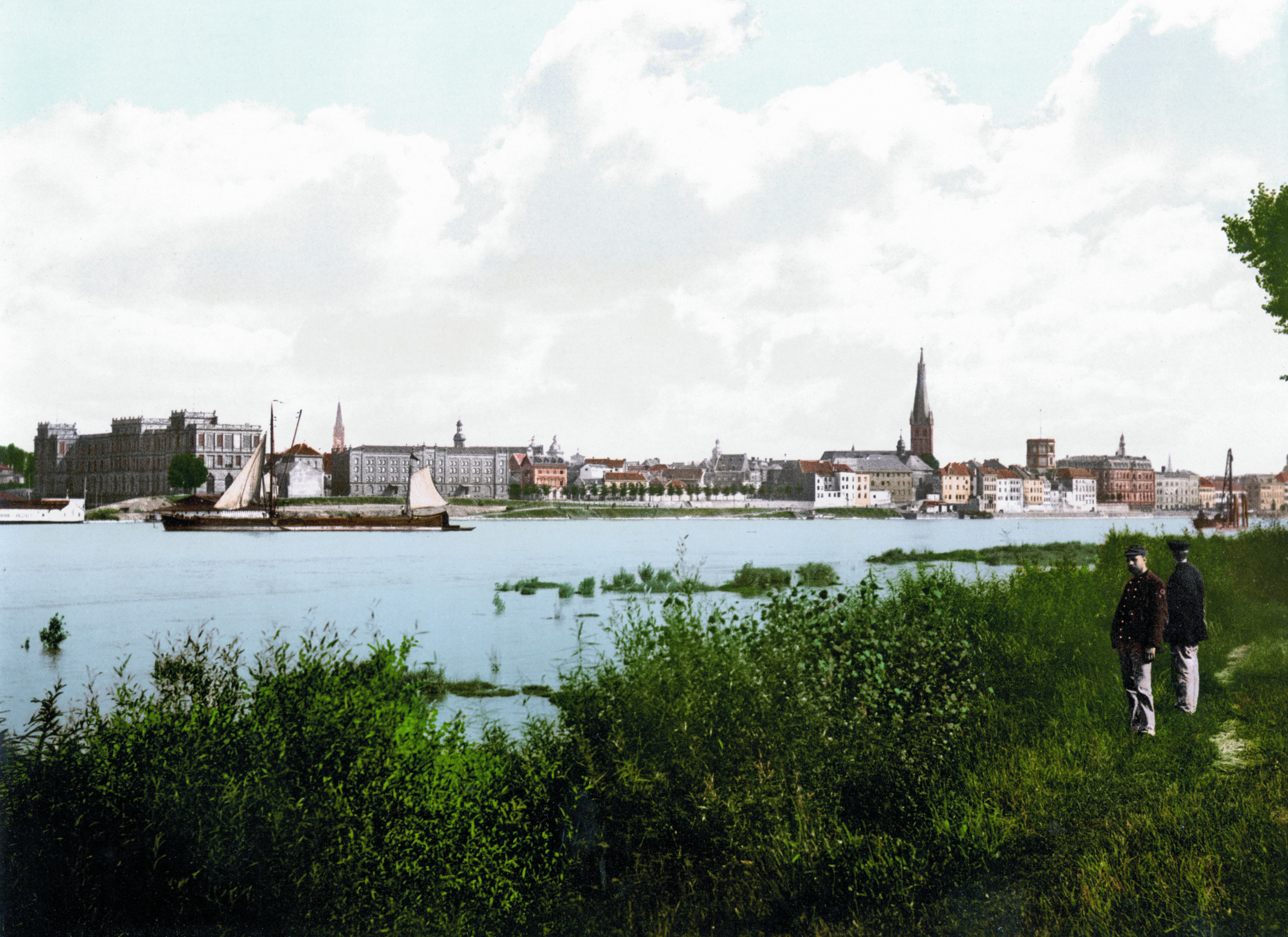
Düsseldorf at the turn of the 19th and 20th centuries

- 1902 – Rhine Promenade laid out.
- 1903 – Great Synagogue built.
- 1904 – Löbbecke Museum opens.
- 1905
  - Schauspielhausgebäude (theatre) opens.
  - Population: 252,630.
- 1907 – Hospitals built.
- 1909 – Ceramics museum founded.
- 1910
  - Königsallee Moving Pictures cinema opens.
  - Largest Fair on the Rhine relocates to fairgrounds in Oberkassel district.
- 1911 – Population: 312,000.
- 1913 - Museum Kunstpalast opened in its current form.
- 1920 – Labor strike.
- 1921 – Max Planck Institute for Iron Research GmbH relocates to Düsseldorf.
- 1924 – Wilhelm Marx House (high-rise) built.
- 1926 – Planetarium and Rheinstadion built.
- 1927 – Airport opens.
- 1929 – Kaiserswerth becomes part of city.
- 1935
  - Robert Schumann Hochschule formed.
  - Ice stadium opens on Brehmstraße.
- 1936
  - Düsseldorf Central Station rebuilt.
  - 1 October: Consulate of Poland relocated from Essen to Düsseldorf.

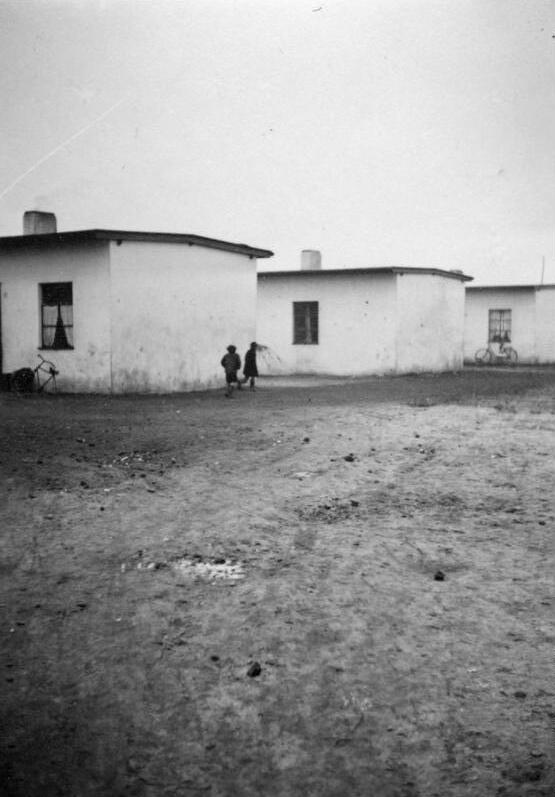
Concentration camp for Romani people in 1937

- 1937
  - Reich's Exhibition of a Productive People held.
  - July: Nazi camp for Sinti and Romani people established (see also Porajmos).
- 1943
  - 28 May: Kalkum forced labour camp established by the SS. Its prisoners were mostly Poles, Russians, Belgians, Dutchmen and Germans.
  - 1 November: Berta forced labour camp established by the SS. Its prisoners were mostly Russians, Poles, Czechs, Ukrainians, Lithuanians and Yugoslavs.
- 1944
  - March/April: DESt forced labour camp established by the SS. Its prisoners were mostly Poles, Russians, Belgians, Dutchmen and Germans.
  - 17 May: Kalkum, Berta and DESt forced labour camps converted into subcamps of the Buchenwald concentration camp.
  - 1 September: Berta II subcamp of the Buchenwald concentration camp established. Its prisoners were mostly Poles, Russians and Czechs.
- 1945
  - March: Berta, Berta II and DESt subcamps dissolved, prisoners deported to the main Buchenwald camp.
  - 10 April: Kalkum subcamp dissolved, prisoners deported to the main Buchenwald camp.
  - 16 April: German Resistance launches Aktion Rheinland.
  - 17 April: City taken by U.S. 97th Infantry Division.
- 1946
  - City becomes capital of North Rhine-Westphalia.
  - Handelsblatt and Rheinische Post newspapers begin publication.
- 1947
  - 28 March: Food protest.
  - Kom(m)ödchen premieres.
- 1950 – Institut Français Düsseldorf founded.
- 1951 – Drupa printing equipment trade fair begins.
- 1955
  - February–March: City co-hosts the 1955 Ice Hockey World Championships.
  - Deutsche Oper am Rhein established.
- 1956 – Opernhaus Düsseldorf re-opens.
- 1957 – North bridge constructed.
- 1958 – New Synagogue built.
- 1960
  - Willi Becker becomes mayor.
  - Dreischeibenhaus built.
- 1961 – Kunstsammlung Nordrhein-Westfalen founded.
- 1962 – Tausendfüßler bridge built.
- 1965 – Marionetten-Theater housed in Palais Wittgenstein.
- 1966 – University of Düsseldorf established.
- 1967 – Kunsthalle Düsseldorf built.
- 1968
  - Düsseldorf Grand Prix tennis tournament begins.
  - Komödie Düsseldorf founded.
- 1969
  - Düsseldorfer Schauspielhaus built.
  - Düsseldorf Boat Show begins.
- 1971
  - Fachhochschule Düsseldorf founded.
  - Philips Halle arena opens.
- 1974 – Botanical garden established.
- 1975 – City districts shaped (approximate date).
- 1977 – City hosts the 1977 IAAF World Cross Country Championships.
- 1979 – Tonhalle Düsseldorf and Flehe Bridge open.
- 1981
  - Düsseldorf Stadtbahn (light rail) begins operating.
  - Rheinturm built.
- 1982 – Collections Premieren Düsseldorf clothing trade fair begins.
- 1984 – Von hier aus art exhibit held.
- 1986 – Kunstsammlung Nordrhein-Westfalen building inaugurated.
- 1987 – Aquazoo–Löbbecke Museum opens.
- 1993
  - Polish Institute founded.
  - Rheinufer Tunnel opens.
- 1994 – Schadow Arkaden shopping mall built.
- 1996
  - 11 April: Düsseldorf Airport fire.
  - Capitol Theater opens.
- 1998 – Neuer Zollhof and Stadttor built.
- 1999 – Joachim Erwin becomes mayor.
- 2000 – Düsseldorf Airport railway station opens.

== 21st century ==
- 2001
  - Arag-Tower built.
  - Museum Kunstpalast opens.
- 2002 – Japan Day festival begins.
- 2005
  - Lichtburg Studio Theater opens.
  - AMD Academy of Fashion and Design founded.
- 2006 – ISS Dome arena opens.
- 2007 – Kunst im Tunnel established.
- 2008 – Dirk Elbers becomes mayor.
- 2011
  - Eurovision Song Contest 2011 held.
  - Population: 592,393.
- 2014 – June: Storm.
- 2015 – General-Consulate of China opened.
- 2017 – City hosts the 2017 World Table Tennis Championships.
- 2018 – Honorary Consulate of Monaco opened.
- 2020 - Stephan Keller become mayor.

== See also ==
- Düsseldorf history
- List of mayors of Düsseldorf
- Timelines of other cities in the state of North Rhine-Westphalia:^{(de)} Aachen, Bonn, Cologne, Dortmund, Duisburg, Essen, Münster

== Bibliography ==
=== in English ===
- "Düsseldorf", Appleton's European Guide Book Illustrated, London: Longmans, Green, Reader, and Dyer, 1871
- Norddeutscher Lloyd (1896), "Düsseldorf", Guide through Germany, Austria-Hungary, Italy, Switzerland, France, Belgium, Holland and England, Berlin: J. Reichmann & Cantor, OCLC 8395555
- G. Holscher (1900), "Düsseldorf", A Guide to the Rhine, Cologne: Hoursch & Bechstedt, OCLC 8672751
- "Düsseldorf" . Encyclopædia Britannica. Vol. 8 (11th ed.). 1910. p. 713.
- "Düsseldorf", Encyclopedia Americana, New York: Encyclopedia Americana Corp., 1918

=== in other languages ===
- Nicolas de Pigage (1781), La Galerie électorale, de Dusseldorff, ou, Catalogue raisonné de ses tableaux (in French), Bruxelles: J.B. Jorez, OL 24342357M
