= Timeline of Duisburg =

The following is a timeline of the history of the city of Duisburg, Germany.

== Prior to 20th century ==
- 883 – First mention of Diusburh.
- 12thC. - Attained the rank of an imperial free town.
- 1290 - Duisburg becomes part of Cleves.
- 1361 - Town Hall first mentioned.
- 1407 - Admitted into the Hanseatic League.
- 1415 - Saviour's Church, Duisburg new building construction begins.
- 1559 - Geographer Mercator moves to Duisburg.
- 1587 - Municipal charter granted.
- 1609 - Elector of Brandendburg in power.
- 1610 – General Synod of the Reformed congregations of Jülich-Cleves-Berg held in Duisburg.
- 1655 - University of Duisburg founded by Frederick William, Elector of Brandenburg.
- 1687 - St. Sebastianus Schützenbruderschaft Duisburg-Huckingen (militia) active (approximate date).
- 1714 - Population: 2,983.
- 1798 - Population: 4,530.
- 1818 - University of Duisburg closed by Frederick William III of Prussia.
- 1842 - Sluice harbour built in the Duisburg-Ruhrort Harbour.
- 1846 - Cologne–Duisburg railway begins operating.
- 1848 - Eintracht Duisburg 1848 sportclub founded.
- 1853 - Duisberger Gesangverein (singing group) formed.
- 1864 - Population: 14,368.
- 1866 - Oberhausen–Duisburg-Ruhrort railway in operation.
- 1871 - Gewerkschaft Deutscher Kaiser coal mine begins operating in Hamborn.
- 1873 - Duisburg-Hochfeld Railway Bridge built.
- 1880 - Population: 41,242.
- 1881 - Horsecar tram begins operating.
- 1887 - Duisburg Concert Hall built.
- 1890
  - Kaiser Harbour built.
  - Population: 59,285.
- 1895 - Population: 70,272.
- 1897 - Electric tram begins operating.
- 1898 - Statue of William I erected on the Kaiserberg (Duisburg).
- 1900 - Population: 92,730.

== 20th century ==
=== 1900-1945 ===
- 1901 - City Hall and Shipping Exchange built.
- 1902 - Kultur- und Stadthistorisches Museum Duisburg founded.
- 1905
  - Meiderich and Ruhrort become part of city.
  - Botanischer Garten der Stadt Duisburg (garden) established.
  - Population: 192,346.
  - Bismarck monument erected on Königstraße (Duisburg).
- 1907 - Rhine Bridge built.
- 1912 - Theater Duisburg built.
- 1917 - Hochfeld Water Tower built.
- 1919 - Population: 244,302.
- 1921 - Wedaustadion (stadium) built.
- 1929 - Hamborn becomes part of city.
- 1930 - Population: 441,158.
- 1934 - Duisburg Zoo founded.
- 1940 - Duisburger Verkehrsgesellschaft (transit entity) established.
- 1941 - Bombing of Duisburg in World War II begins.

=== 1946-1990s ===
- 1950 - Brücke der Solidarität and Schwanentorbrücke bridges built.
- 1954 - Friedrich Ebert Bridge built.
- 1956 - Deutsche Oper am Rhein opera company established.
- 1960 - Church of Our Lady, Duisburg built.
- 1961 - Population: 504,975.
- 1963 - Berlin Bridge, Duisburg built.
- 1964 - Lehmbruck-Museum of modern art opens.
- 1966 - Kreuz Kaiserberg roadway spaghetti junction opens.
- 1968 - University of Duisburg re-established.
- 1970 - Filmforum Duisburg opens.
- 1971 - Rheinbrücke Neuenkamp (bridge) built.
- 1975
  - Homberg, Rheinhausen, Rumeln-Kaldenhausen, and Walsum become part of city.
  - Josef Krings becomes mayor.
- 1977 - Duisburger Akzente cultural festival and Duisburger Filmwoche movie festival begin.
- 1980 - Bundesautobahn 42 (roadway) opens.
- 1981 - Rhein-Ruhr-Marathon begins.
- 1982 - Duisburg City Archive moves to Karmelplatz.
- 1985 - Thyssen plant closes.
- 1988 - Duisburger Tanztage dance festival begins.
- 1990 - Annual Duisburg Music Prize begins.
- 1992 - U-Bahnhof Rathaus (Duisburg) opens.
- 1997 - Bärbel Zieling becomes mayor.
- 1999
  - Duisburg Synagogue built.
  - Landschaftspark Duisburg-Nord created.

== 21st century ==
- 2003 - University of Duisburg-Essen active.
- 2004 - Adolf Sauerland becomes mayor.
- 2007
  - August: Italian organized-crime murders occur in Duisburg.
  - Mercatorhalle rebuilt.
- 2008
  - Turkish-Islamic Union for Religious Affairs Marxloh Mosque built.
  - Forum Duisburg shopping mall opens.
- 2009
  - January: Duisburg flag dispute
  - 30 August: 2009 Duisburg election held.
- 2010
  - 24 July: Love Parade disaster.
  - Population: 489,599.
- 2011 - Tiger and Turtle – Magic Mountain sculpture erected in the Angerpark.
- 2012 - Sören Link becomes mayor.

== See also ==
- Duisburg history
- History of Duisburg
- List of heritage sites in Duisburg
- List of mayors of Duisburg (in German)
- Urbanization in the German Empire
- Timelines of other cities in the state of North Rhine-Westphalia:^{(de)} Aachen, Bonn, Cologne, Dortmund, Düsseldorf, Essen, Münster

== Bibliography ==
=== in English ===
- "Duisburg" . Encyclopædia Britannica. Vol. 8 (11th ed.). 1910. p. 650.
- "Duisburg", The Rhine, Baedeker's Rhine, Leipzig: Karl Baedeker, 1911, hdl:2027/hvd.hnj5e2, OCLC 21888483

=== in German ===
- Paul Clemen, ed. (1893). Die Kunstdenkmäler der Stadt Duisburg und der Kreise Mülheim a.d. Ruhr und Ruhrort. Die Kunstdenkmäler der Rheinprovinz (in German). Vol. 2. Dusseldorf: Schwann.
- Soest und Duisburg. Die Chroniken der deutschen Städte (in German). Vol. 24. Leipzig: Historische Kommission bei der Bayerischen Akademie der Wissenschaften. 1895. hdl:2027/njp.32101073599712.
- "Duisburg". Brockhaus' Konversations-Lexikon (in German) (14th ed.). Leipzig: Brockhaus. 1896. hdl:2027/njp.32101064064460.
- P. Krauss; E. Uetrecht, eds. (1913). "Duisburg". Meyers Deutscher Städteatlas [Meyer's Atlas of German Cities] (in German). Leipzig: Bibliographisches Institut.
- Günter von Roden. Geschichte der Stadt Duisburg. Duisburg: Walter Braun Verlag, 1974–1975.
- Joseph Milz, ed. (1985), Duisburg, Rheinischer Städteatlas (in German), vol. 4 (2nd ed.)
