= List of mayors of Düsseldorf =

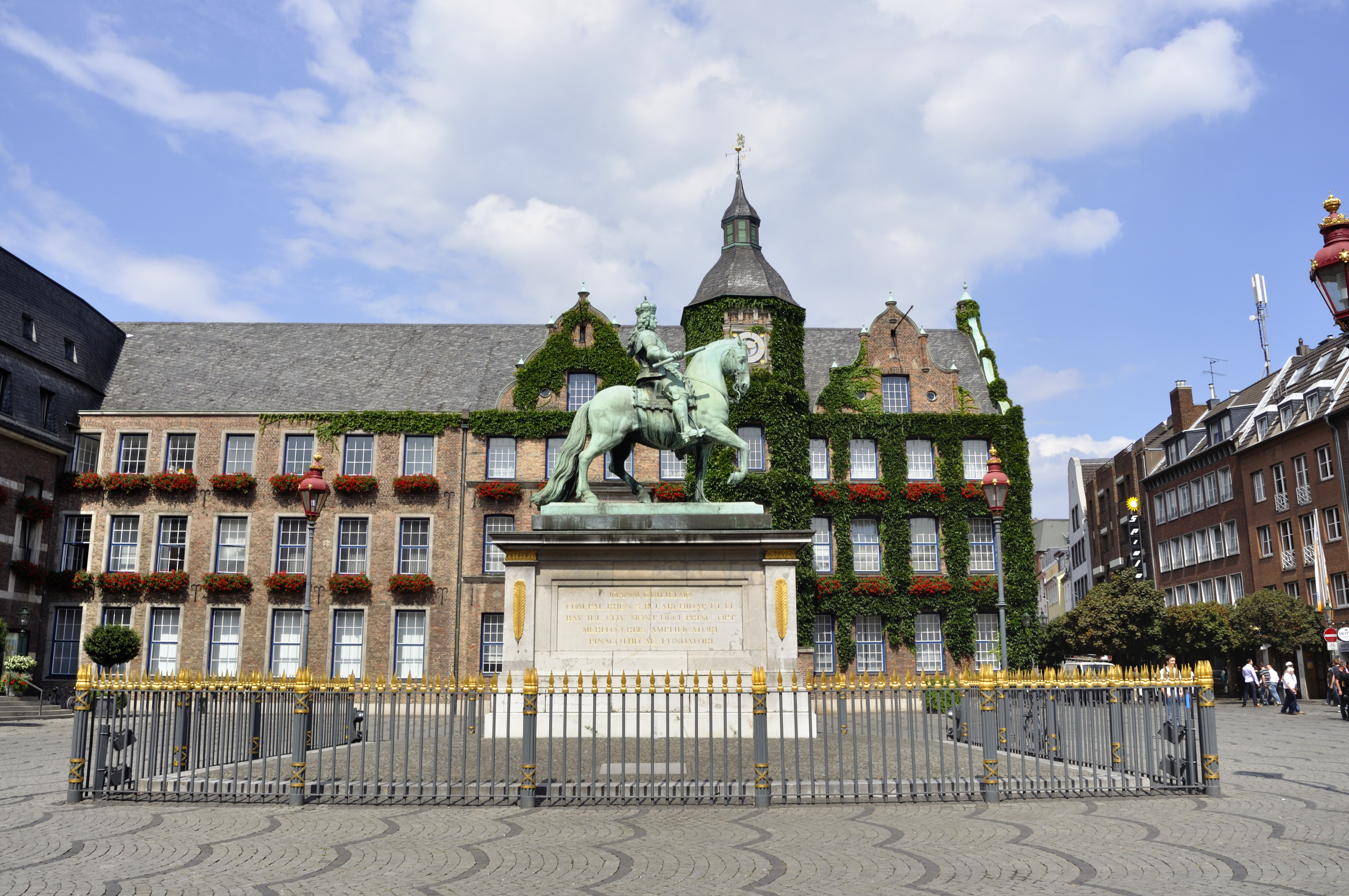
Düsseldorf City Hall

Coat of arms of Düsseldorf

This is a list of mayors of Düsseldorf, Germany. The mayor of Düsseldorf is titled Oberbürgermeister (sometimes translated as Lord Mayor).

== List ==
- 1815–1820: Dr. Engelbert Schramm
- 1820–1822: Lambert Josten
- 1822–1824: Joseph Molitor
- 1824: Leopold Custodis
- 1824–1828: Friedrich Adolf Klüber
- 1828–1833: Philipp Schöller
- 1833–1848: Joseph von Fuchsius
- 1848–1849: Wilhelm Dietze
- 1849: Ludwig Viktor Graf von Villers
- 1849–1876: Ludwig Hammers
- 1876–1886: Friedrich Wilhelm Becker
- 1886–1899: Ernst Heinrich Lindemann (Note: Ernst Lindemann was the grandfather of Kapitän zur See Ernst Lindemann, the battleship Bismarck commander.)
- 1899–1910: Wilhelm Marx
- 1911–1919: Dr. Adalbert Oehler
- 1919–1924: Dr. Emil Köttgen
- 1924–1933: Dr. Dr. h.c. Robert Lehr (DNVP)
- 1933–1937: Dr. Hans Wagenführ
- 1937: Otto Liederley
- 1937–1939: Dr. Dr. Helmut Otto
- 1939–1945: Dr. Karl Haidn
- 1945: Werner Keyßner
- 1945: Dr. Wilhelm Fullenbach
- 1945–1946: Walter Kolb (SPD)
- 1946–1947: Karl Arnold (CDU)
- 1947–1959: Josef Gockeln (CDU)
- 1956–1959: Georg Glock
- 1960–1961: Willi Becker
- 1961: Dr. h.c. Fritz Vomfelde
- 1961–1964: Peter Müller (CDU)
- 1964–1974: Willi Becker
- 1974–1979: Klaus Bungert (SPD)
- 1979–1984: Josef Kürten (CDU)
- 1984–1994: Klaus Bungert (SPD)
- 1994–1999: Marie-Luise Smeets (SPD)
- 1999–2008: Joachim Erwin (CDU)
- 2008–2014: Dirk Elbers (CDU)
- 2014–2020: Thomas Geisel (SPD)
- 2020–present: Stephan Keller (CDU)
