= Mixing Bowl =

A mixing bowl is a bowl used for mixing of ingredients.

Mixing Bowl is also a nickname for the following United States highway interchanges:

- The confluence of Interstate 696 with several other roads in the suburbs of Detroit, Michigan
- Part of the Pentagon road network in Arlington, Virginia
- Springfield Interchange in Springfield, Virginia

== See also ==
- Malfunction Junction (disambiguation)
- Spaghetti Junction
