= Angela Erwin =

German politician (born 1980)

Member of the Landtag of North Rhine-Westphalia
- Incumbent
- Assumed office 1 June 2017
- Preceded by: Marion Warden
- Constituency: Düsseldorf III

Personal details
- Born: 30 May 1980 (age 45) Düsseldorf
- Party: Christian Democratic Union (since 1999)
- Parent: Joachim Erwin (father)

Angela Erwin (born 30 May 1980 in Düsseldorf) is a German politician serving as a member of the Landtag of North Rhine-Westphalia since 2017. She is the daughter of Joachim Erwin.
