= Quirla =

- Ortsteil of Stadtroda
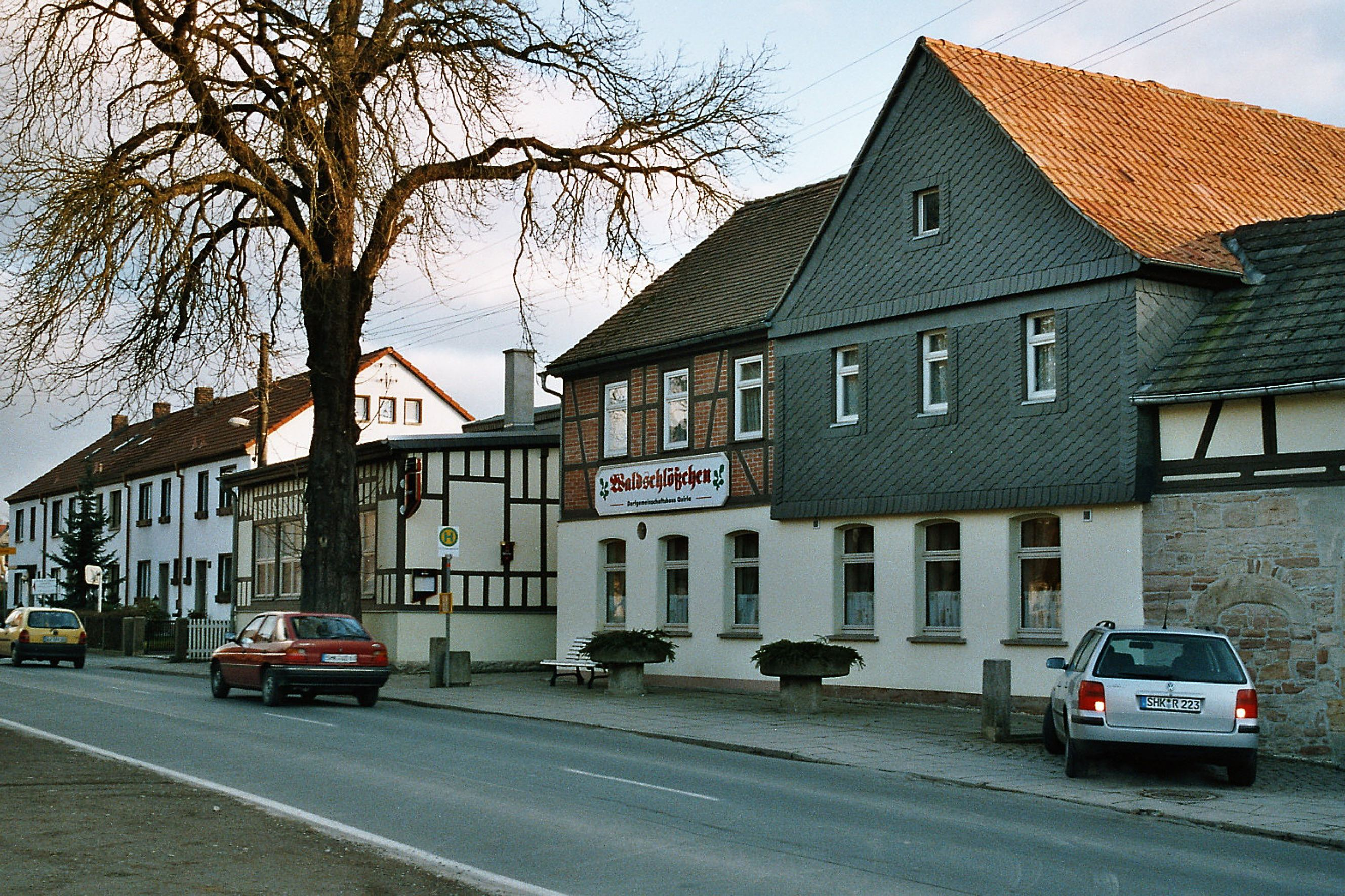
- Buildings in Quirla
- Interactive map of Quirla
- Location within Germany Location within Thuringia
- Coordinates: 50°51′49″N 11°46′2″E
- Country: Germany
- State: Thuringia
- District: Saale-Holzland-Kreis
- Town: Stadtroda

Area
  - Total: 4.07 km^{2} (1.57 sq mi)
- Elevation: 290 m (950 ft)

Population (2017-12-31)
  - Total: 504
  - Density: 124/km^{2} (321/sq mi)
- Time zone: UTC+01:00 (CET)
  - Summer (DST): UTC+02:00 (CEST)
- Postal codes: 07646
- Dialling codes: 036428
- Vehicle registration: SHK, EIS, SRO
- Website: www.stadtroda.de

Quirla (German pronunciation: [ˈkvɪʁla]) is a village and a former municipality in the district Saale-Holzland, in Thuringia, Germany. Since 1 January 2019, it is part of the town Stadtroda.
