= Bollberg =

- Ortsteil of Stadtroda
- Interactive map of Bollberg
- Location within Germany Location within Thuringia
- Coordinates: 50°52′46″N 11°47′28″E
- Country: Germany
- State: Thuringia
- District: Saale-Holzland-Kreis
- Town: Stadtroda

Area
  - Total: 3.34 km^{2} (1.29 sq mi)
- Elevation: 324 m (1,063 ft)

Population (2017-12-31)
  - Total: 287
  - Density: 85.9/km^{2} (223/sq mi)
- Time zone: UTC+01:00 (CET)
  - Summer (DST): UTC+02:00 (CEST)
- Postal codes: 07646
- Dialling codes: 036428
- Vehicle registration: SHK, EIS, SRO
- Website: www.stadtroda.de

Bollberg (German pronunciation: [ˈbɔlˌbɛʁk]) is a village and a former municipality in the district Saale-Holzland, in Thuringia, Germany. Since 1 January 2019, it is part of the town Stadtroda.
