= Thomas Geisel =

German politician (born 1963)

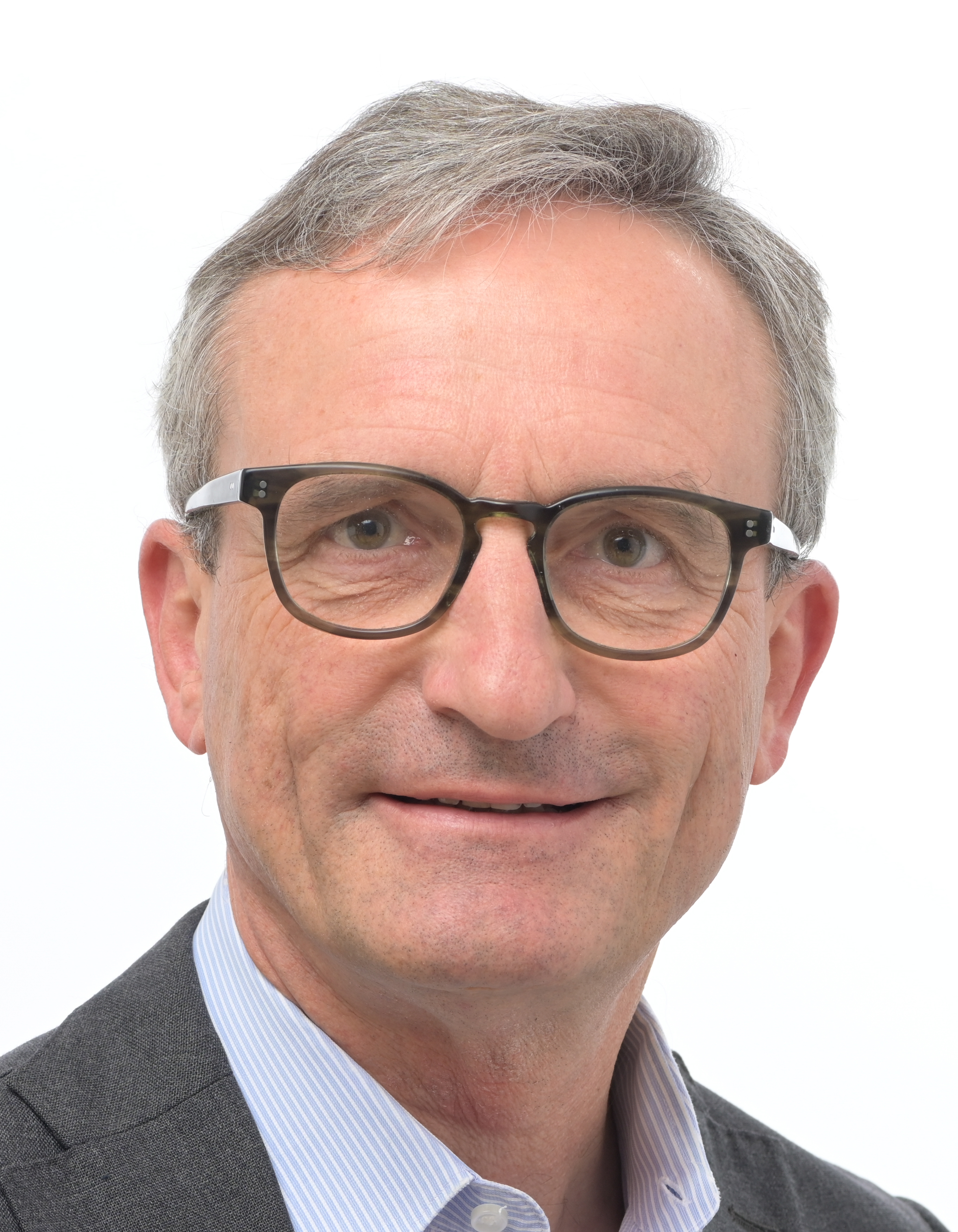
- Official portrait, 2024

Member of the European Parliament for Germany
- Incumbent
- Assumed office 16 July 2024

Mayor of Düsseldorf
- In office 2 September 2014 – 31 October 2020
- Preceded by: Dirk Elbers
- Succeeded by: Stephan Keller

Personal details
- Born: Thomas Geisel; 26 October 1963 (age 63) Ellwangen, Baden-Württemberg, West Germany
- Party: BSW (2024–present)
- Other political affiliations: SPD (1983–2024)
- Spouse: Vera Geisel
- Children: 5
- Education: University of Freiburg
- Occupation: Lawyer • Politician

Thomas Christian Wilhelm Geisel (born 26 October 1963) is a German politician from the Bündnis Sahra Wagenknecht party and former member of the Social Democratic Party. Together with Fabio De Masi, he ran successfully in the European Parliament election in 2024 for BSW.

He served as mayor of Düsseldorf, the capital of North Rhine-Westphalia, from 2014 until 2020 for SPD.

== Education and early career ==
Trained as a lawyer, Geisel worked at Enron in London from 1998 until 2000 and at Ruhrgas from 2000 until 2013. He received a MPA from Harvard Kennedy School and a MA from Georgetown University.

== Political career ==
Geisel joined the SPD as a member in 1983.

In a runoff election, Geisel defeated the previous Christian Democratic mayor Dirk Elbers by gaining 59.2% of the votes. During his time in office, Düsseldorf sold its stake in utility RWE for 155.4 million euros ($171.28 million) in 2019.

For the local elections on September 13, 2020, Geisel was again chosen by the SPD as the top candidate for the Düsseldrorf City Council and as a candidate for the office of mayor with 95.5% To warn young people to comply with the regulations of the Corona Protection Ordinance Geisel produced a video with rapper Farid Bang and gained nationwide attention. There was a hail of criticism with reference to the rapper's misogynistic and violence-glorifying lyrics, and the SPD also distanced itself from Geisel's video. Geisel received 26.27% of the votes cast in the first round; his challenger Stephan Keller (CDU) got 34.1%.

Thomas Geisel lost the office as mayor in the second round of the Düsseldorf communal election on September 27, 2020, He got 44,0 % of the votes, his opponent Stephan Keller reached 56,0%.

After the election defeat, Geisel gave up all of his mandates.

=== Flip over to BSW ===
Geisel got back on political stage by joining the new populist party of German political figure Sahra Wagenknecht in January 2024. Geisel appeared at the newly formed party's press conference on January 8, 2024 and indicated that he was seeking political office with the BSW at 2024 European Parliament election. Together with Fabio De Masi, he wants to become the party's top candidate.

In the SPD, Geisel's defection was only noted without much attention. "He's probably bored," said Jochen Ott, head of the SPD in the state parliament of North Rhine-Westphalia.

== Positions ==
Geisel supports Gerhard Schröder's Hartz IV laws. He said in January 2024, Schröder was "the main enemy of the SPD today".

== Other activities ==
=== Corporate boards ===
- Innogy, Member of the Retail International Business Council (since 2016)
- Düsseldorf Airport, Ex-Officio Chairman of the Supervisory Board (since 2014)
- Düsseldorf Marketing & Tourismus, Ex-Officio Chairman of the Supervisory Board (since 2014)
- Industrieterrains Düsseldorf-Reisholz AG, Ex-Officio Chairman of the Supervisory Board (since 2014)
- Messe Düsseldorf, Ex-Officio Chairman of the Supervisory Board (since 2014)
- Rheinbahn, Ex-Officio Chairman of the Supervisory Board (since 2014)
- Stadtwerke Düsseldorf, Ex-Officio Member of the Supervisory Board (since 2014)
- SWD Städtische Wohnungsbau-GmbH & Co. KG, Ex-Officio Chairman of the Supervisory Board (since 2014)

=== Non-profit organizations ===
- Deutsche Oper am Rhein, Ex-Officio Chairman of the Supervisory Board (since 2014)
- Düsseldorf Festival, Ex-Officio Member of the Board of Trustees (since 2014)
- Museum Kunstpalast, Ex-Officio Chairman of the Board of Trustees (since 2014)
- ZERO Foundation, Ex-Officio Chairman of the Board of Trustees
- Atlantik-Brücke, Member
- Tönissteiner Kreis, Member
- German United Services Trade Union (ver.di), Member

== Controversy ==
In late 2017, Geisel came under intense international criticism for canceling an exhibition about the Jewish art dealer Max Stern, who was forced to liquidate his gallery in Düsseldorf after the Nazis took power before World War II. At the time, he cited “demands for information and restitution in German museums in connection with the Galerie Max Stern.” Following protests from the Jewish community in Düsseldorf, the World Jewish Congress, the partner museums in Israel and Canada, and the German government, Geisel later backtracked on his last-minute cancellation.

== Personal life ==
Geisel is married and has five daughters. The family lives in Düsseldorf-Pempelfort.
