= Stadtroda =

- Town
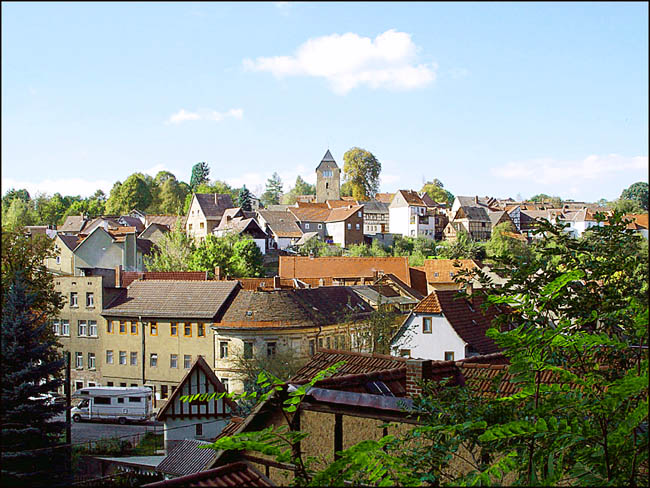

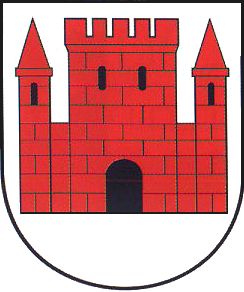
- Coat of arms

- Location of Stadtroda within Saale-Holzland-Kreis district
- Interactive map of Stadtroda
- Location within Germany Location within Thuringia
- Coordinates: 50°51′N 11°44′E
- Country: Germany
- State: Thuringia
- District: Saale-Holzland-Kreis
- Subdivisions: 2

Government
  - Mayor (2024–30): Klaus Hempel

Area
  - Total: 24.18 km^{2} (9.34 sq mi)
- Elevation: 200 m (660 ft)

Population (2025-12-31)
  - Total: 6,785
  - Density: 280.6/km^{2} (726.8/sq mi)
- Time zone: UTC+01:00 (CET)
  - Summer (DST): UTC+02:00 (CEST)
- Postal codes: 07646
- Dialling codes: 036428
- Vehicle registration: SHK, EIS, SRO
- Website: www.stadtroda.de

Stadtroda (German pronunciation: [ʃtatˈʁoːda]; Roda until 1925) is a town of 6,653 people (2017), located in Thuringia, Germany. Stadtroda lies on the river Roda, a tributary of the Saale. The former municipalities Bollberg and Quirla were merged into Stadtroda in January 2019.

== History ==
According to the Faust legend, Johann Georg Faust was born in Roda in 1480, though there is no historical evidence for this. A plan to sell the house said to have been his birthplace to Chicago for the 1893 World’s Columbian Exposition fell through after the town requested $100,000; the building was subsequently demolished. Press reports in 1897 stated that it had been condemned by the town and sold at auction to a local junk dealer for $25.

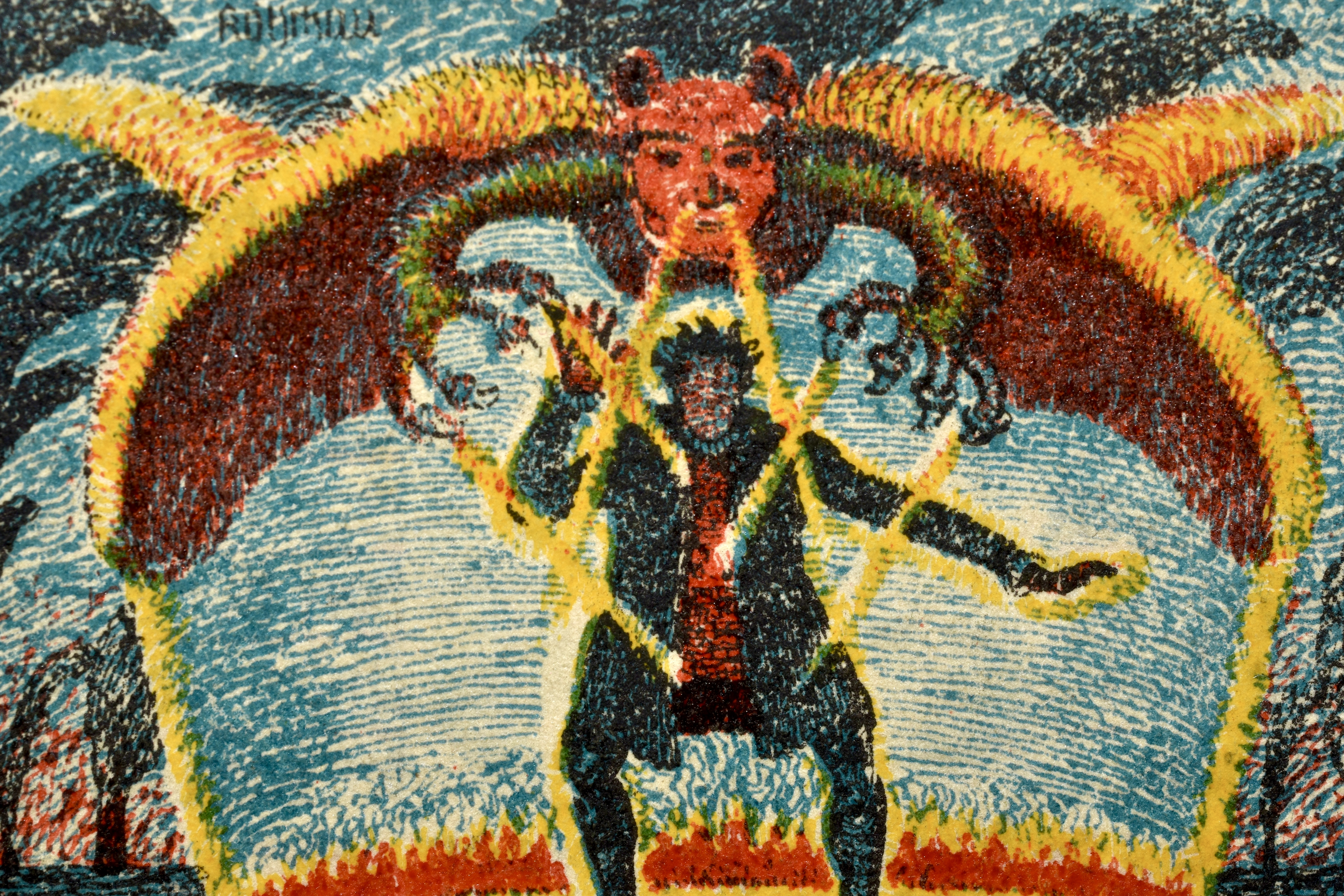
A 50 Pfennig notgeld note from Roda depicting Faust.

Within the German Empire (1871–1918), Roda was part of the Duchy of Saxe-Altenburg.

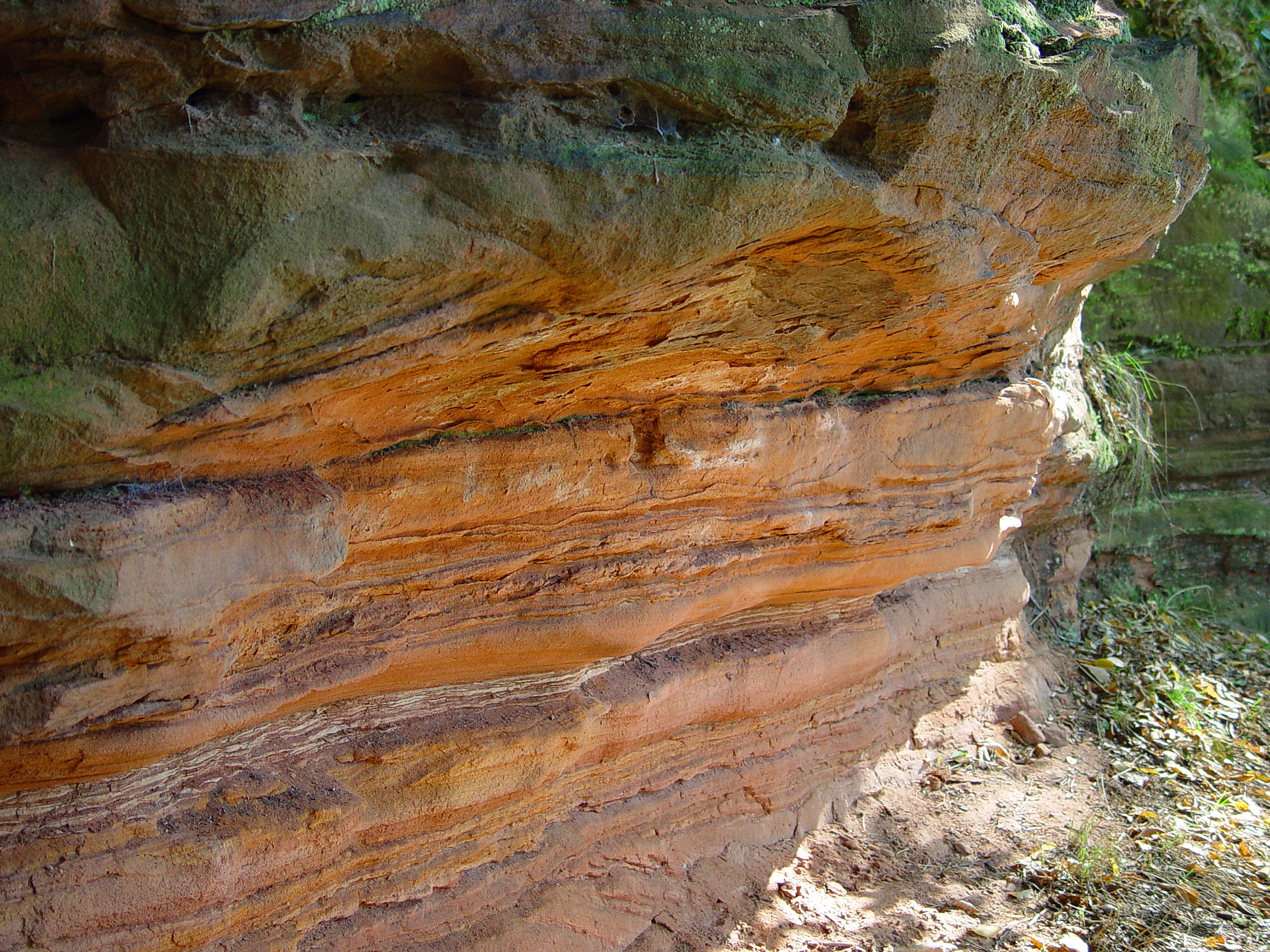
Sandstone near Stadtroda, Germany.

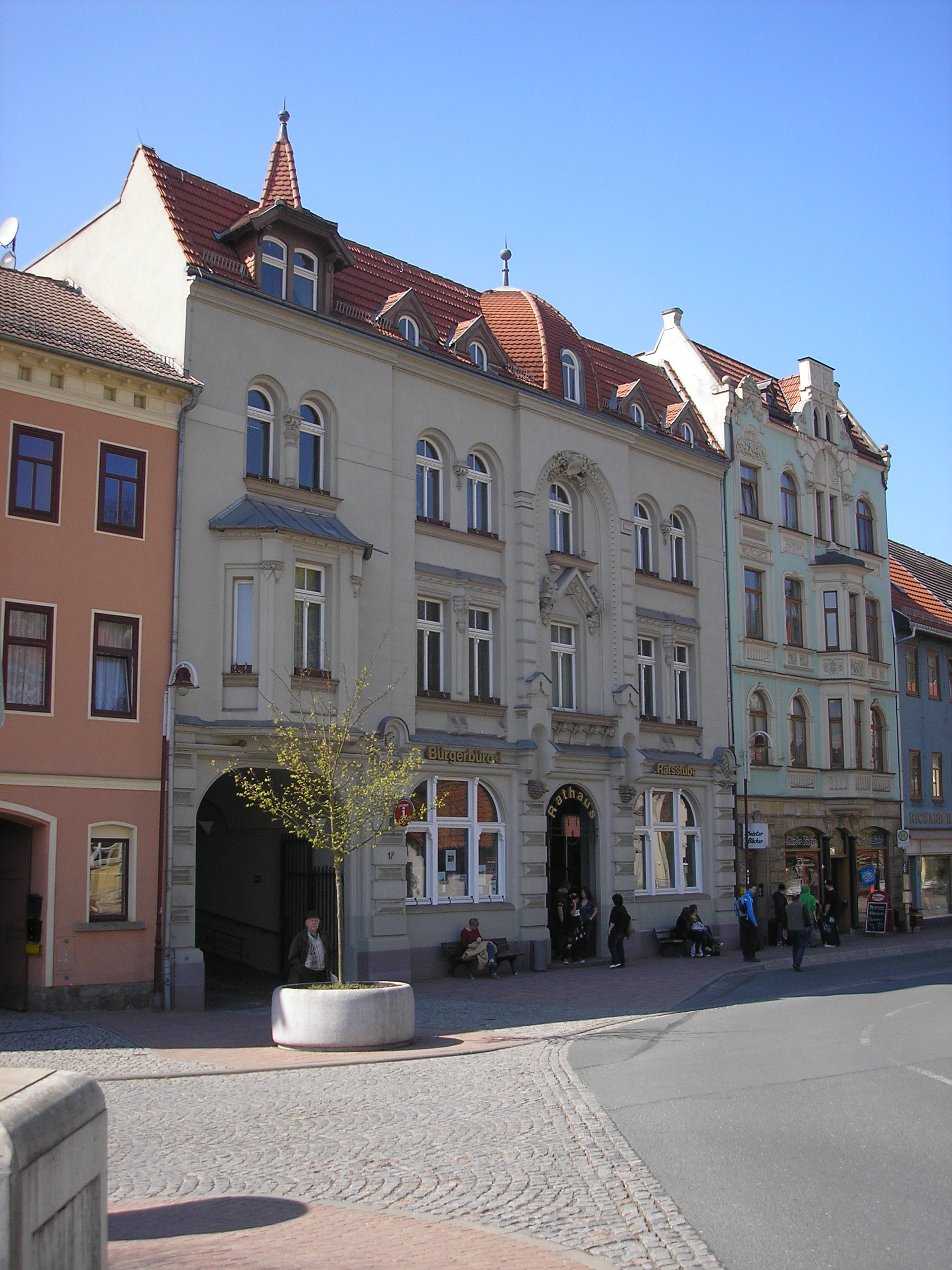
Town hall Stadtroda

== Mayors ==
Mayors since 1886

- 1886–1892: Gottfried Knoch
- 1892–1898: Friedrich Goedel
- 1898–1906: Hermann Loeser
- 1906–1908: Wilhelm Dieterici
- 1908–1928: Rudolf Goedecke
- 1928–1934: Ernst Paul Schönherr
- 1935–1938: Franz Degen
- 1938–1941: Gerhard Wunderling
- 1941–1942: Max Oswald (acting)
- 1942–1945: ? Horn
- 1945: Max Oswald (acting)
- 1945–1946: Wilhelm Meier
- 1946–1950: Otto Seifarth
- 1950–1953: Ernst Klinger
- 1953–1954: Theo Wurlitzer
- 1954–1955: Rudolf Pabst (acting)
- 1955: Georg Vater
- 1955–1958: Walter Hilbert
- 1959–1961: Kurt Krüger
- 1961–1965: Günter Hoppe
- 1965–1972: Kurt Neugebauer
- 1972: Volkmar Ernst
- 1972–1984: Heinz Rosenkranz
- 1984–1986: Kurt Halbauer
- 1986–1990: Rainer Haufe
- 1990–1992: Karl-Heinz Herrmann
- 1992: Harald Reuter (acting)
- 1992–2012: Harald Kramer (CDU)
- since 2012: Klaus Hempel (Free voters)

== Notable people ==
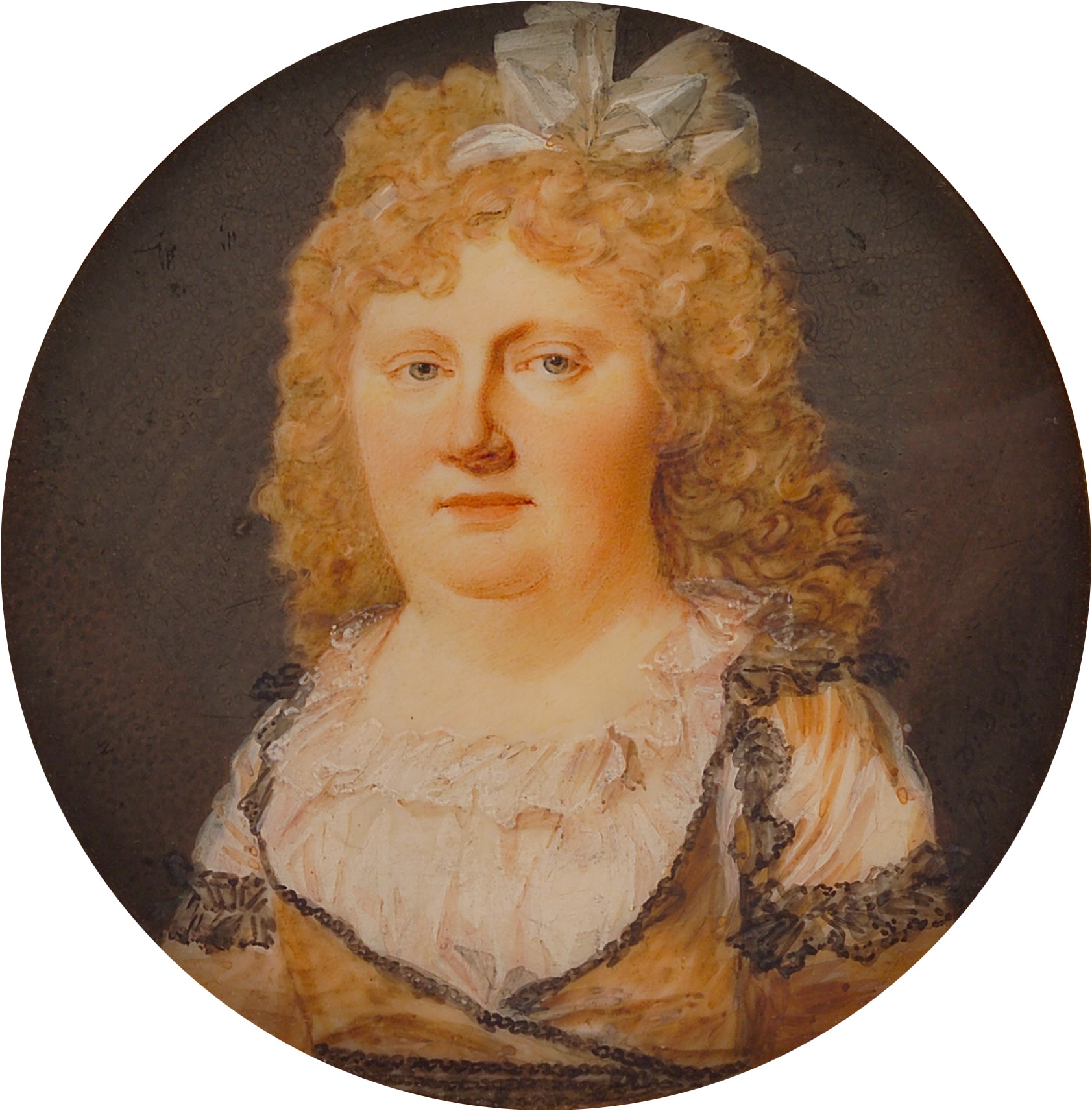
Princess Luise around 1800

- Princess Louise of Saxe-Gotha-Altenburg (1756–1808), Princess of Sachsen-Gotha, Duchess of Mecklenburg-Schwerin, wife of the regent in the same place
- Paul Leopold Friedrich (1864–1916), surgeon
- Joachim Erwin (1949–2008), jurist and CDU politician, mayor of Düsseldorf 1999–2008
