= Martin Kirschner =

German surgeon (1879–1942)

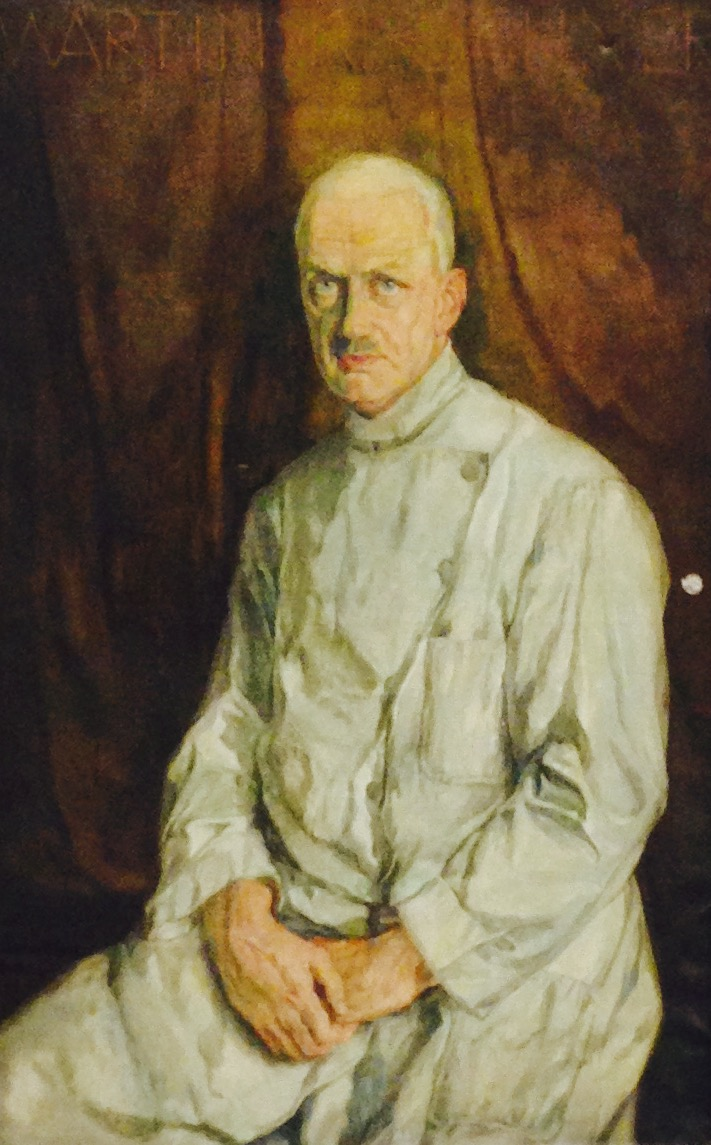
- Martin Kirschner
- Born: 28 October 1879; Breslau, Germany
- Died: 30 August 1942 (aged 62); Heidelberg, Germany
- Scientific career
- Fields: surgery

Martin Kirschner (28 October 1879 – 30 August 1942) was a German surgeon.

Kirschner was born in Breslau, the son of Margarethe Kalbeck (sister of Max Kalbeck) and Judge Martin Kirschner (1842–1912), who later served as city councillor (member of the city government) of Breslau since 1873 and a member of the city parliament as of 1879. In 1892, he became burgomaster of Berlin (vice-mayor) and advanced to its Lord Mayor (Oberbürgermeister) holding that office between 1899 and 1912.

Kirschner junior attended the University of Freiburg, the University of Strasbourg, the University of Zurich and the Ludwig-Maximilians-Universität München.

Following his promotion in Strasbourg in 1904 he went to the Friedrich Wilhelm University of Berlin for postgraduate studies under Rudolf von Renvers (1854–1909). Between 1908 and 1910 he was at the university surgical clinic at the University of Greifswald under Erwin Payr (1871–1947), then went to the University of Königsberg to work with Payr and Paul Leopold Friedrich (1864–1916). He was appointed professor of surgery at Königsberg in 1916, and in 1927 accepted an invitation to move to the same chair at the University of Tübingen.

On 18 March 1924, Kirschner performed the first successful pulmonary artery embolectomy — Trendelenburg's operation. He developed a new method for the making an artificial oesophagus and a method for the opening of the knee joint.

In 1933, he published the first stereotactic surgery in humans, for a method to treat trigeminal neuralgia by inserting an electrode into the trigeminal nerve and ablating it.

Kirschner died, aged 62, in Heidelberg.

== See also ==
- Kirschner wire
