= Karl-Heinz Petzinka =

German architect

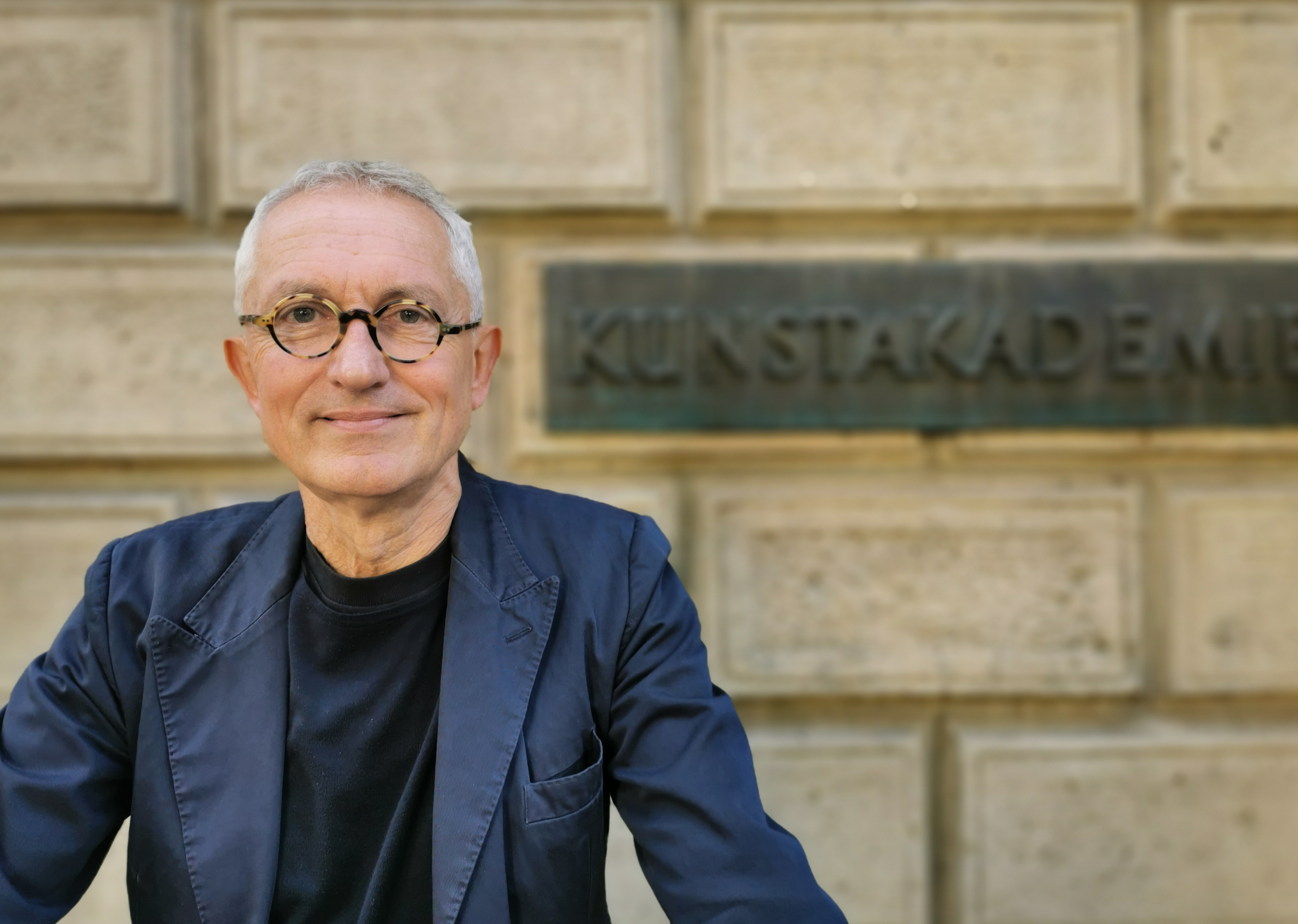
- Karl-Heinz Petzinka in 2021
- Born: 7 January 1956 (age 69); Bocholt, West Germany
- Education: RWTH Aachen
- Occupations: Architect; Academic teacher
- Organizations: Technische Universität Darmstadt; Petzinka Pink Technological Architecture; Kunstakademie Düsseldorf; RWTH Aachen
- Awards: Villa Massimo

Karl-Heinz Petzinka (born 7 January 1956) is a German architect, and Rector of the Kunstakademie Düsseldorf. He is known for office buildings in Düsseldorf and Berlin. He converted historic industrial buildings, and was responsible for the section architecture for the Ruhr.2010 project.

== Career ==
Notable buildings in today's Germany: 1 – Stadttor, 2 – Konrad Adenauer Haus (Bundeszentrale der CDU), 3 – Jahrhunderthalle Bochum, 4 – Herkules von Gelsenkirchen, 5 – Zeche Nordstern, 6 – Schloß Horst Quartier, 7 – Vertretung des Landes Nordrhein-Westfalen beim Bund

Born in Bocholt, Petzinka studied architecture at the RWTH Aachen from 1976 and graduated in 1982 with the academic degree of Diplom-Ingenieur. In 1981, he received the North Rhine-Westphalia state's Förderpreis for young artists in the field of architecture. After his first professional years 1982–1983 as a freelance architect in the office of O. M. Ungers in Cologne, he worked as an assistant to Wolfgang Döring at the RWTH Aachen from 1983 to 1985. From 1986 to 1987, he was a scholarship holder of the Villa Massimo in the architecture category. From 1988, Petzinka taught design at the Bergische Universität Wuppertal, and in 1994 he was appointed professor in the Department of Design and Building Technology at the Technische Universität Darmstadt, where he taught until 2007. During this time, Petzinka also held guest professorships at the Kunstakademie Düsseldorf and at RWTH Aachen. At the same time, he founded the Petzinka Pink Architekten studio together with Thomas Pink in 1994, with offices in Düsseldorf and Berlin.

The conversion of the Jahrhunderthalle in Bochum in 2002/03 is one of the projects in which this concept – in this case the addition of technological and reactivating elements to the historical building fabric and building construction – was implemented. At the same time, the Jahrhunderthalle marks the opening of a new field of work in Petzinka's oeuvre with the conversion of historic buildings to a new use. In October 2004, Petzinka took over as chairman of the management of the real estate company THS Wohnen with headquarters in the converted Zeche Nordstern in Gelsenkirchen. Petzinka left the company in November 2011.

In 2007, Petzina was appointed as one of four program directors of the Ruhr.2010 project for the Ruhr being European Capital of Culture in 2010. He was responsible for the sector "City of Possibilities" which included architecture, urban development and visual arts.

Since 2008, he has been professor of the Baukunst class at the Kunstakademie Düsseldorf. He also acts as an adjudicator at national and international level. Since 2012, he has also held a visiting professorship at the Austral University of Chile on the topics of systems, urban planning and planning in non-European countries. On 24 April 2017, Petzinka became the fourth architect to be elected Rector of the Kunstakademie Düsseldorf. He took office on 1 August 2017 for a term of four years.

== Work ==
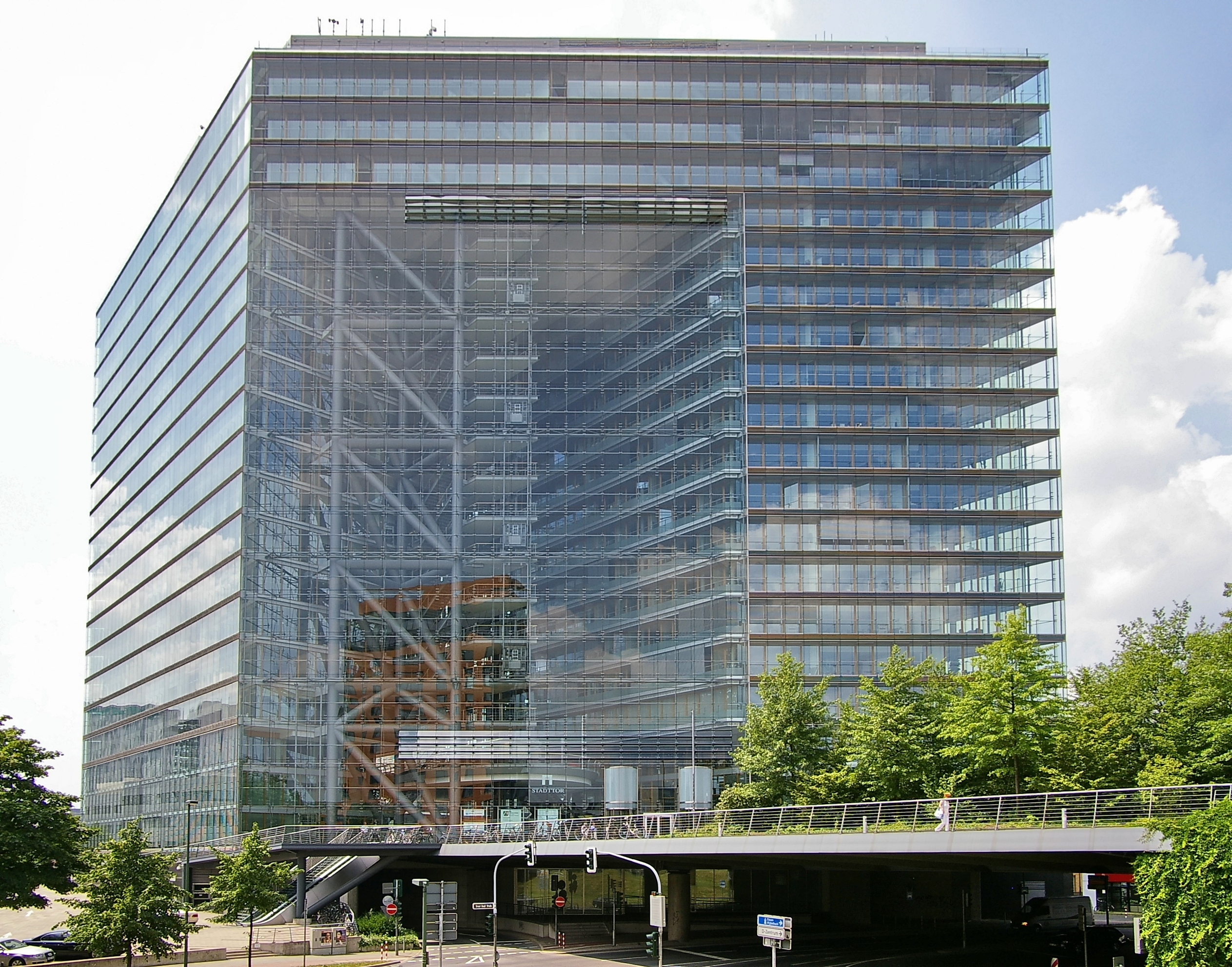
Stadttor Düsseldorf

Petzinka's best-known architectural projects include the Stadttor, a skysrcaper in Düsseldorf that won the MIPIM award, the Konrad-Adenauer-Haus built in Berlin as the federal headquarter of the Christian Democratic Union of Germany (CDU), the Representation of the state of North Rhine-Westphalia to the Federal Government in Berlin, and the conversion of the Jahrhunderthalle in Bochum into a venue for the Ruhrtriennale festival.

Petzinka has also planned and realised buildings in the commercial, public and administrative sectors as well as private residences. In Gelsenkirchen, he was involved in the construction of the Hercules of Gelsenkirchen, the Nordstern Video Art Centre Goetz Collection, the planning of the urban development project Stadtquartier am Schloß Horst, and the revitalization of both the workshop building of the Zeche Nordstern and of the Rote Halle in Düsseldorf.

== Publications ==
- Karl-Heinz Petzinka, Bernhard Lenz, Jürgen Volkwein, Florian Lang: Technische Gebäudeausstattung In Giebeler, Fisch, Krause, Musso, Petzinka, Rudolphi: "Atlas Sanierung. Instandhaltung, Umbau, Ergänzung" Birkhäuser, Basel 2008, ISBN 978-3-7643-8874-4.
- Karl-Heinz Petzinka, Bernhard Lenz: Planen und Bauen in Lebenszyklen In Energieatlas – Nachhaltige Architektur; Birkhäuser, Basel 2007, ISBN 3-7643-8385-2.
- Busmann, Johannes (2003). Jahrhunderthalle Bochum – Montagehalle für Kunst (in German). Wuppertal: Müller und Busmann. ISBN 978-3-928766-57-9. OCLC 76584681.
- Karl-Heinz Petzinka, Thomas Pink, Johannes Busmann: Technologische Architektur; Birkhäuser, Basel 2004, ISBN 3-7643-0373-5.
