= Paul Leopold Friedrich =

German surgeon and bacteriologist

Paul Leopold Friedrich (26 January 1864 – 15 January 1916) was a German surgeon and bacteriologist born in the town of Roda, Saxe-Altenburg.

In 1888 he received his doctorate at the University of Leipzig, and as a young assistant worked under Robert Koch (1843–1910) at the Reich Health Office in Berlin. From 1894 he worked as a privat-docent of surgery in Leipzig, where in 1896 he became an associate professor. Later he served as a professor at the Universities of Greifswald (from 1903), Marburg (from 1907) and Königsberg (from 1911). At Greifswald he succeeded August Bier (1861–1949) as director of the Surgical University Hospital. Two of Friedrich's well-known assistants were Ferdinand Sauerbruch (1875–1951) and Martin Kirschner (1879–1942).

Friedrich was skilled in many aspects of surgery, including pioneer work in the field of thoracic surgery (lungs). He is remembered for his studies of wound treatment and his efforts to reduce bacterial infections. Through experimentation, he demonstrated the importance of debridement (removal of infected tissue) within a six-hour time limit. He also did extensive work involving diseases that included peritonitis and tuberculosis. He is credited for introducing the practice of using seamless rubber gloves during surgery.
