= Stadttor =

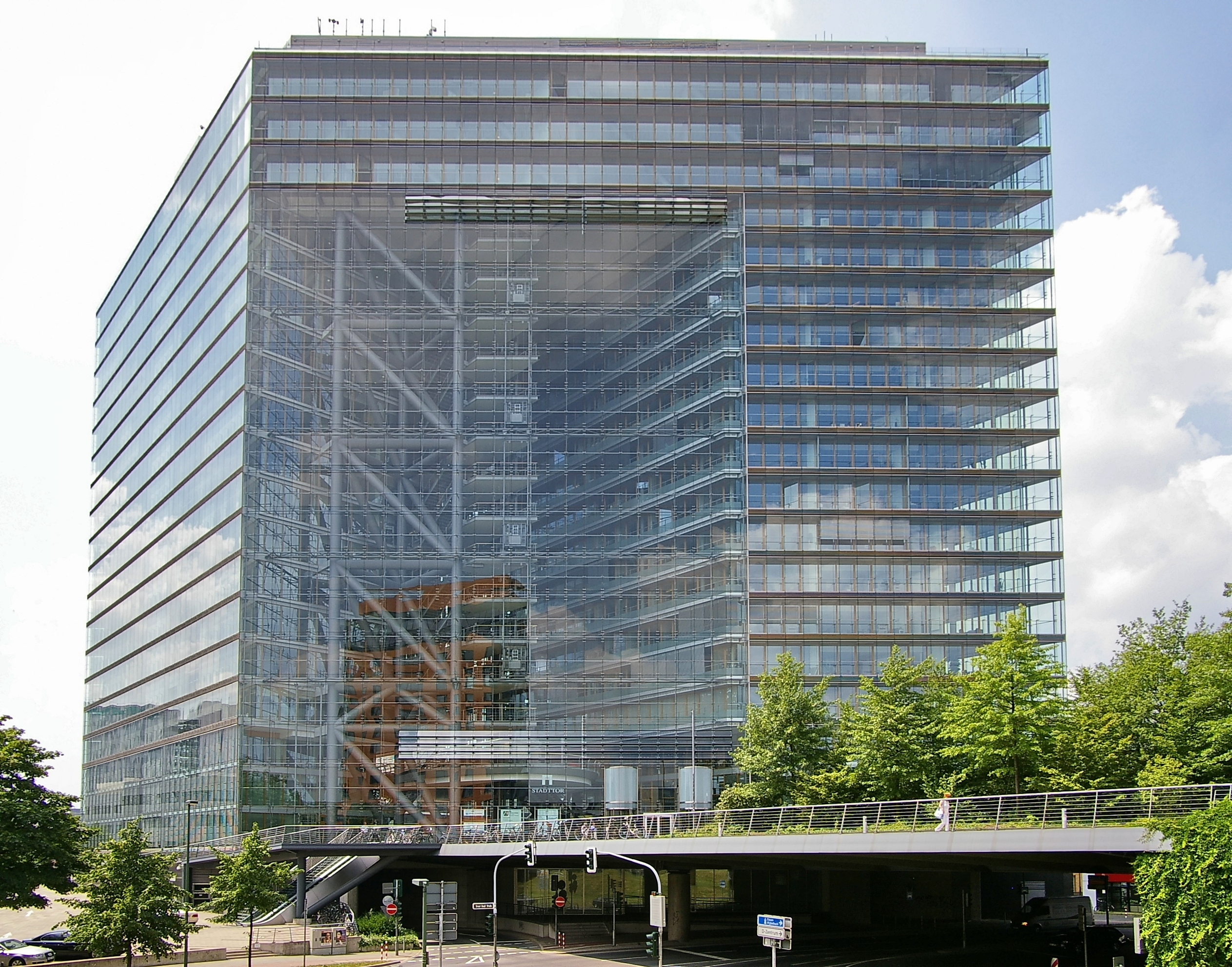
- Interactive map of the Stadttor area

General information
- Type: Commercial offices
- Architectural style: Modernism
- Location: Stadttor 1 Düsseldorf, Germany
- Coordinates: 51°12′55″N 6°45′40″E
- Completed: 1995–1998
- Owner: GbR Düsseldorf Stadttor mbH

Height
- Roof: 75 m (246 ft)

Technical details
- Floor count: 20
- Floor area: 41,000 m^{2} (440,000 sq ft)
- Lifts/elevators: 11

Design and construction
- Architect: Petzinka Pink und Partner
- Engineer: Arup; Stahlbau Lavis
- Main contractor: August Heine Baugesellschaft

Stadttor (transl. City Gate) is a 20-storey 75 m (246 ft) high-rise building in the Unterbilk neighborhood of Düsseldorf, Germany. The building was designed by Düsseldorf-based architecture firm Petzinka Pink und Partner and completed in 1998. It marks the Southern entrance of Rheinufertunnel, which is also the reason for its parallelogram-shaped floor plan.

The building features a 15-story atrium and a double-facade, allowing natural ventilation even on higher elevation floors. The total gross floor area is some 30,000 m^{2} (320,000 sq ft). From 1999 until 2017, the Stadttor was the seat of the state-chancellery of the Minister-President of North Rhine-Westphalia.

== See also ==
- List of tallest buildings in Germany
