= Kunst im Tunnel =

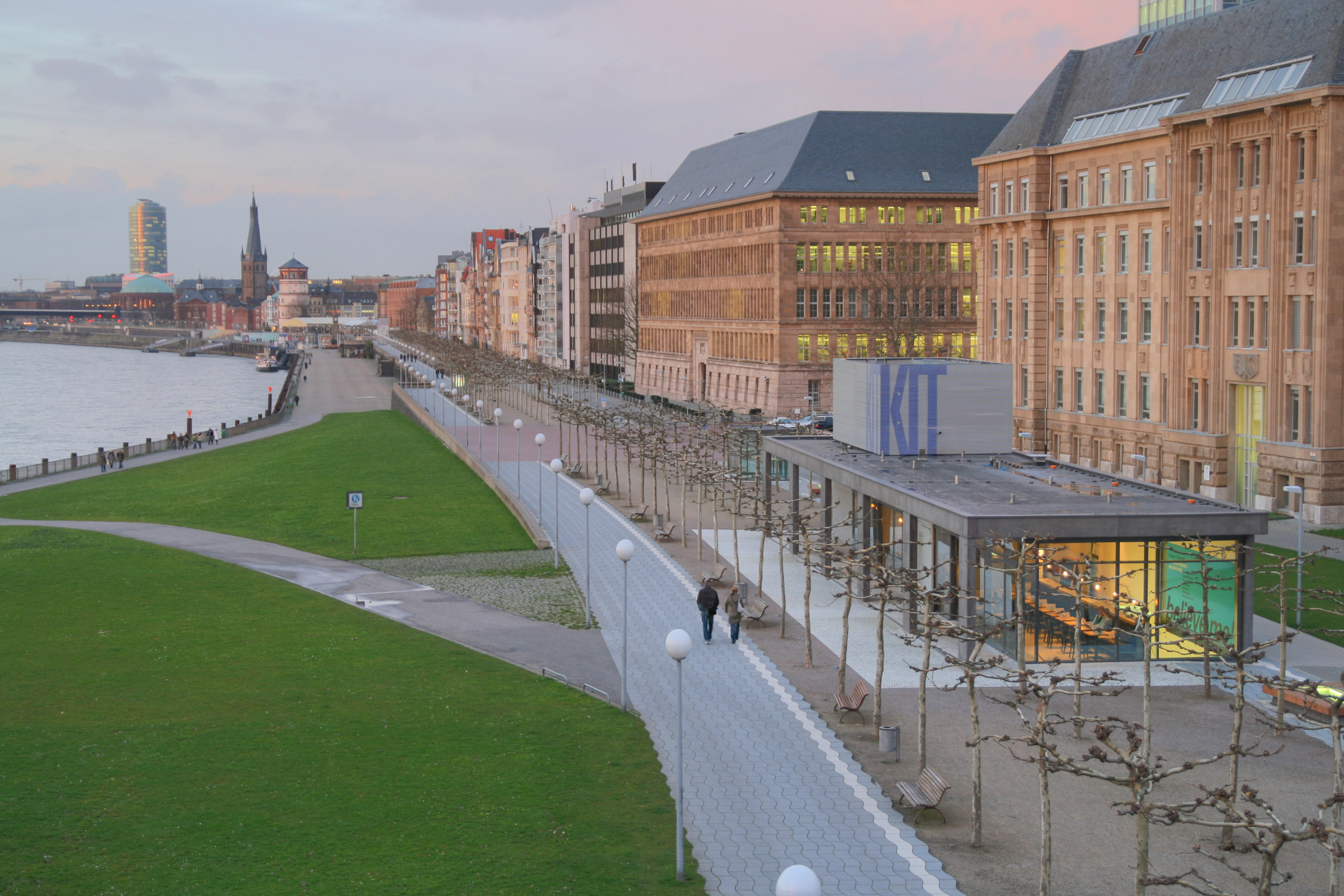
- Entrance to KIT, along the Rhine Promenade
- Established: 10 February 2007
- Location: Carlstadt, Düsseldorf, Germany
- Coordinates: 51.219917°N 6.766778°E
- Type: Contemporary art gallery
- Director: Gertrud Peters
- Public transit access: Düsseldorf Stadtbahn: U71 U72 U73 at Graf-Adolf-Platz
- Website: www.kunst-im-tunnel.de

Kunst im Tunnel or KIT is a contemporary art museum in Düsseldorf. It is the new exhibition space of Kunsthalle Düsseldorf, located within the Rheinufertunnel - hence the name. It has an underground exhibition area of 850m².
