= Malfunction Junction =

Malfunction Junction is a common nickname for a number of highway interchanges, especially ones that are poorly designed, dangerous, and/or suffer from severe traffic congestion:

- Malfunction Junction, interchange at Interstate 240 and Interstate 55 in Memphis, Tennessee.
- Malfunction Junction, former interchange configuration at Interstate 20/Interstate 59, and Interstate 65 in Birmingham, Alabama. It was closed for renovation on January 21, 2019
- Malfunction Junction, interchange at Interstate 4 and Interstate 275 in Tampa, Florida
- Malfunction Junction, interchange at Interstate 26 and Interstate 40 in Asheville, North Carolina
- Malfunction Junction, former interchange configuration among Interstate 75, State Route 4 and local streets in Dayton, Ohio
- Malfunction Junction, interchange at Interstate 26 and Interstate 20 near Columbia, South Carolina
- Malfunction Junction, interchange configuration between Interstate 40 and Interstate 275 adjacent to downtown Knoxville, Tennessee
- Malfunction Junction, intersection at U.S. Route 25E, U.S. Route 25W, and U.S. Route 25 in Corbin, Kentucky
- Malfunction Junction, former configuration of the Tom Moreland Interchange near Atlanta, Georgia
- Malfunction Junction, interchange at I-565 and Memorial Parkway in Huntsville, Alabama
- Malfunction Junction, interchange configuration at Interstate 24 and Interstate 65 just north of downtown Nashville, Tennessee

== Similarly named junctions ==
- Disfunction Junction, the southeastern terminus of New York Route 73 at U.S. Route 9

== See also ==
- "Conjunction Junction", animated educational short from the Schoolhouse Rock! series
- Dead Man's Curve
- Spaghetti junction
