= Kreuz Kaiserberg =

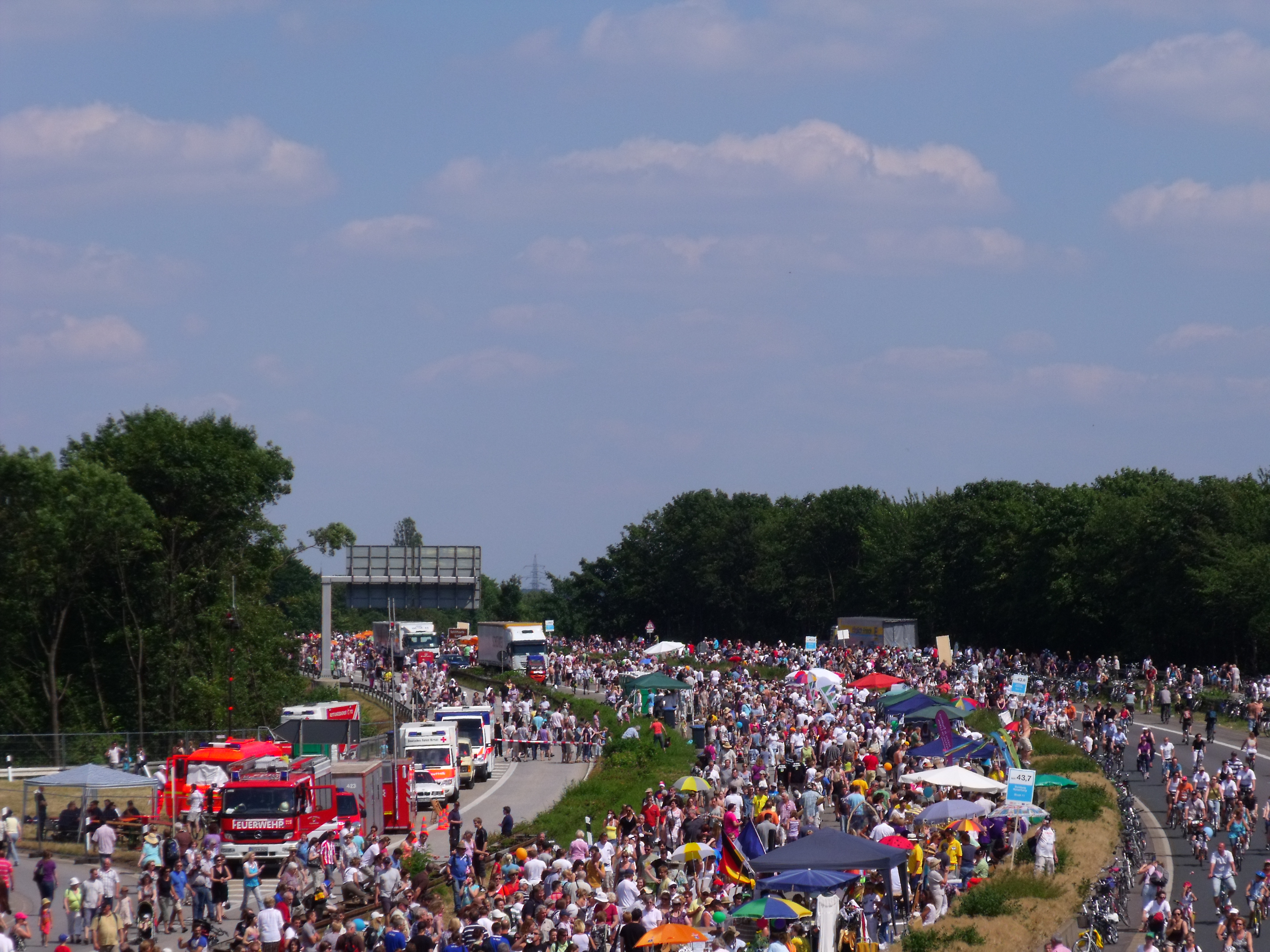
- The Ruhr.2010 "Still-Leben" event at the interchange

Location
- Duisburg, Germany
- Coordinates: 51°26′30″N 6°48′20″E
- Roads at junction: A 3; A 40

Construction
- Type: Spaghetti Junction
- Lanes: 2x3/2x4
- Opened: 1966/1969/1974

The Kreuz Kaiserberg (German: Autobahnkreuz Kaiserberg) is a spaghetti junction in the Metropolitan region Rhein-Ruhr in the German state of North Rhine-Westphalia.

The interchange forms the connection between the A3, which runs from the Dutch border near Elten via Oberhausen and Frankfurt am Main to the Austrian border south of Passau, and the A40 (Ruhrschnellweg) from Venlo to Dortmund.

== Geography ==
The Kreuz Kaiserberg is located in the city of Duisburg and is called after the 75-metre-high Kaiserberg there. To the west lies the district of Duissern and south of the interchange is the Duisburg Zoo. North of the interchange are the River Ruhr and the Duisburg harbour. Nearby cities are Mülheim an der Ruhr and Oberhausen. The interchange is approximately 3 km east of the city centre of Duisburg.

== History ==
The building of the interchange began in October 1966. It was opened to traffic in stages between April and June 1969; the connection on the eastern side to the Ruhrschnellweg (previously known as B60) opened at the same time. The western section of what is now the A40, between the Kreuz Duisburg and the A3, was completed in 1974.

Until April 1992, the A40 east of the Kreuz Kaiserberg was designated the A430 and west of it the A2. To the north, the A3 and the A2 were combined as far as the Kreuz Oberhausen. Until 1992, the official name of the intersection was Duisburg-Kaiserberg. The stretch of autobahn and the intersection were both renamed because reuse of the same name (in this case for the Duisburg-Kaiserberg exit and the Duisburg-Kaiserberg intersection) and double numbering of a section of motorway (A2/A3) are not permitted.

In May 2010, the interchange was the scene of an unusual accident: a car travelling over one of its bridges broke through the concrete barrier and fell onto the A3 below. The car's 46-year-old driver was severely injured and had to be rescued by the fire brigade. The driver of another car travelling on the A3 was slightly injured, as he was unable to brake in time and crashed into the fallen car.

On 18 July 2010, a 60 km (37 mi) stretch of the A40 between Dortmund and Duisburg was closed for the Ruhr.2010 European Capital of Culture project Still-Leben ("Still Life"). As part of that event, several hundred thousand people gathered at Kreuz Kaiserberg to celebrate Ruhr.2010. In the centre of the intersection was an installation by German-based American artist Rita McBride modelled on the Delicate Arch in Utah, USA. The gathering has been described as "the most beautiful traffic jam Kreuz Kaiserberg has ever had". It was the first time since 1973 that pedestrians had been permitted to roam the interchange without being endangered by traffic.

== Building form ==
As a "spaghetti junction", the interchange was built in an unusual way. Due to the narrow angle in which the motorways cross, the ramps had to be built in a small space and all lie south of the main bridge in the interchange.

== Road configuration ==
Near the interchange the A3 is a 2x3 lane motorway, but between the interchange on- and off-ramps is a 2x2 motorway. On the Essen side, the A40 is 2x2, but on the Duisburg side it has been expanded to 2x3. In addition, since 2014 the A40 has been further expanded between the Kaiserberg and Duisburg interchanges, only in the direction of Essen, to 4 lanes without hard shoulder. All the ramps are single-lane, except those that lead in multiple directions. In their transport planning document (Bundesverkehrswegeplan), the German government has designated widening the A40 to 2x3 lanes on the Essen side as highly urgent.

== Traffic near the interchange ==
Approximately 205,000 vehicles passed through the interchange on a daily basis in 2010.

From	To	Average daily traffic	Percentage of heavy traffic
AS Oberhausen-Lirich (A 3)	AK Kaiserberg	126.800	13,1 %
AK Kaiserberg	AS Duisburg-Wedau (A 3)	97.600	11,3 %
AK Duisburg (A 40)	AK Kaiserberg	101.300	12,8 %
AK Kaiserberg	AS Duisburg-Kaiserberg (A 40)	85.300	8,3 %

The portion of the A40/A44 between the Kreuz Kaiserberg and Kreuz Werl is traditionally one of the most congested sections of Autobahn in Germany.
