= Spaghetti junction =

Intertwined road traffic interchange

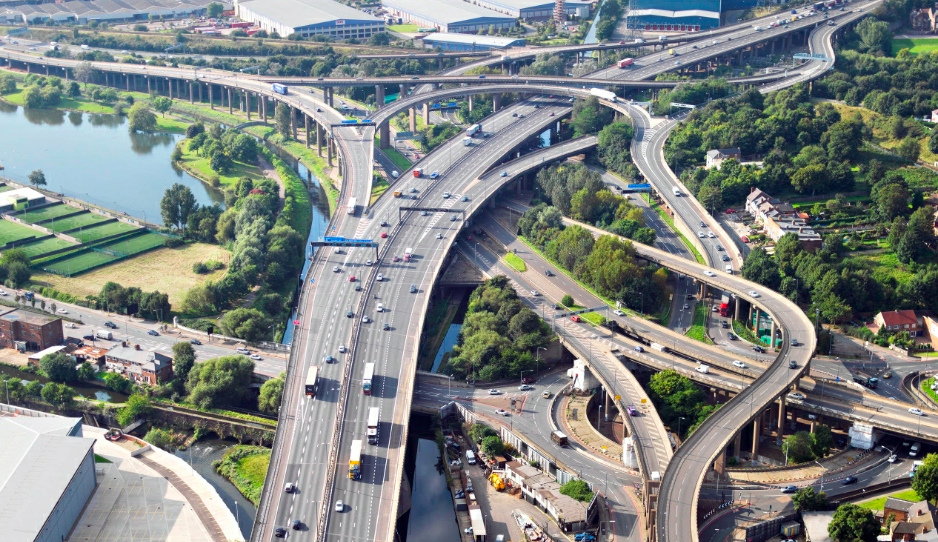
The Gravelly Hill Interchange in Birmingham, England – the originally coined 'Spaghetti Junction'

Spaghetti junction is a nickname sometimes given to a complex or massively intertwined road traffic interchange that is said to resemble the interwoven state of a plate of spaghetti. Such interchanges may incorporate a variety of interchange design elements in order to maximize connectivity.

== Etymology ==
In the U.S., use of the term "Spaghetti Junction" dates back to a 1959 description of a planned interchange in Louisville, Kentucky.

In Europe, the term was originally used to refer to the Gravelly Hill Interchange on the M6 motorway in Birmingham, United Kingdom. In an article published in the Birmingham Evening Mail on 1 June 1965 the journalist Roy Smith described plans for the junction as "like a cross between a plate of spaghetti and an unsuccessful attempt at a Staffordshire knot", with the headline above the article on the newspaper's front page, written by sub-editor Alan Eaglesfield, reading "Spaghetti Junction". Since then many complex interchanges around the world have acquired the nickname. Throughout North America, this type of interchange is widely referred to as a spaghetti junction, spaghetti bowl, mixing bowl, knot, or maze, often including the name of the freeway, city, or notable landmark near enough to the interchange.

== By country ==
=== Australia ===
==== New South Wales ====
- Light Horse Interchange, at the junction of the M4 and M7 in Eastern Creek, Sydney.
- Rozelle Interchange, at the intersection of City West Link, Victoria Road and the Western Distributor in Rozelle, Sydney

==== Victoria ====
- Springvale Junction at the intersection of Dandenong, Springvale, Police and Centre roads in Melbourne

==== Queensland ====
- The interchange at the junction of M3 Inner City Bypass, M7 Clem Jones Tunnel, and M7 Airport Link in Bowen Hills, Brisbane

=== Botswana ===
- Thapama Interchange at the junction of A1 / Blue Jacket Street and A3 in Francistown.

=== Canada ===
==== Alberta ====
- The interchange of Deerfoot Trail, Bow Bottom Trail, Anderson Road and 15 Street SE in Calgary. Maps were published in local newspapers to assist drivers with navigating the complex interchange when it opened in 1982.

==== Ontario ====
- The interchange between Bloor Street, Dundas Street, and Kipling Avenue in Toronto's west end, officially known as the Six Points Interchange, but often referred to as the "Spaghetti Junction". This interchange was demolished and reconfigured between 2019 and 2021 to become at-grade junctions.
- The interchange between Highway 427 and the Queen Elizabeth Way and Gardiner Expressway has been referred to as a "messy spaghetti junction" by UrbanToronto.

==== Quebec ====
- The Turcot Interchange, the largest interchange in the province of Quebec, and the third busiest in Montréal. It contains Autoroute 15 and Autoroute 20
- The Décarie Interchange, One of the oldest intersections in Montréal, Quebec. It contains Autoroute 40 and Autoroute 15

=== China ===
- Huangjuewan interchange
- Guiyang Qianchun interchange

=== Germany ===
- The Kaiserberg interchange between the A3, which runs from the Dutch border near Elten via Oberhausen and Frankfurt am Main to the Austrian border south of Passau, and the A40 (Ruhrschnellweg) from Venlo to Dortmund.

=== Indonesia ===
- The interchange between Waru-Juanda Toll Road, Surabaya–Gempol Toll Road, and Surabaya–Mojokerto Toll Road in border of Surabaya and Sidoarjo, East Java.

=== Malaysia ===
- The Penchala Interchange between Damansara-Shah Alam Elevated Expressway (DASH), Damansara-Puchong Expressway (LDP) and Sprint Expressway (Penchala Link). The interchange also links to local roads to Damansara Perdana, Mutiara Damansara and Kampung Penchala.

=== Netherlands ===
- The Ridderkerk interchange, connecting the A16, A15 and A38. Both the A16 and A15 are split into two carriageways in both directions, serving as separate through-traffic and collector/distributor carriageways.

=== New Zealand ===
- Central Motorway Junction, the intersection of New Zealand State Highway 1 and Highway 16, as well as several separate on-and off-ramp clusters, south of the city centre of Auckland.

=== South Africa ===
- EB Cloete Interchange, the intersection of the N2 and N3 freeways in Durban.

=== Turkey ===
- The İkitelli junction, connecting the highways O-2 and O-7.

=== United Kingdom ===
- Gravelly Hill Interchange, from which the phrase "Spaghetti Junction" originated, is the five-level intersection of the M6 motorway (Junction 6), A38(M) motorway, A38 road and A5127 road above a railway line, three canals and a river in Birmingham. The phrase comes from the birds-eye view of the road, with the roads interconnecting.
- Worsley Braided Interchange, between the M60 (formerly M62), M61, A580 and A666(M), between Manchester and Bolton, which opened in 1970.

=== United States ===
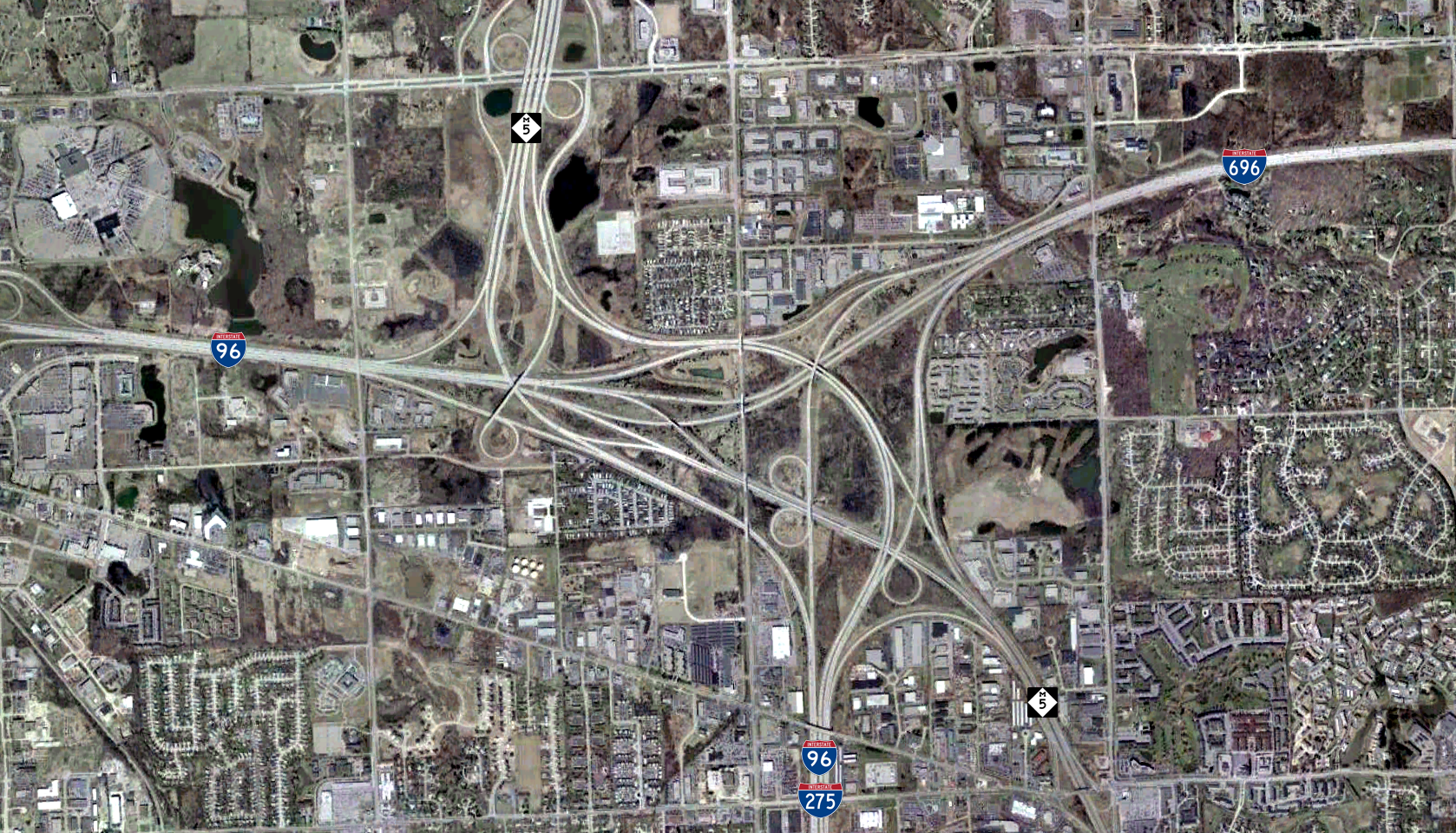
A complicated interchange between I-96, M-5, I-275, and I-696 in Novi, Michigan

==== California ====
- East Los Angeles Interchange, in downtown Los Angeles, also called "Malfunction Junction", connects I-5, I-10, US-101, and SR-60. The intersection also contains shifting alignments and does not contain complete freedom of movement.
- MacArthur Maze, in Oakland, also called the "Distribution Structure", connects I-80 west, I-80 east / I-580 west, I-580 east to SR-24 / I-980, and I-880 south.

==== Florida ====
- Golden Glades Interchange, in Miami Gardens and North Miami Beach, connects U.S. Route 441 (US 441), Florida's Turnpike, the Palmetto Expressway (signed State Road 826), SR 9, North Miami Beach Boulevard (NW 167th Street) and Interstate 95 (I-95).

==== Georgia ====
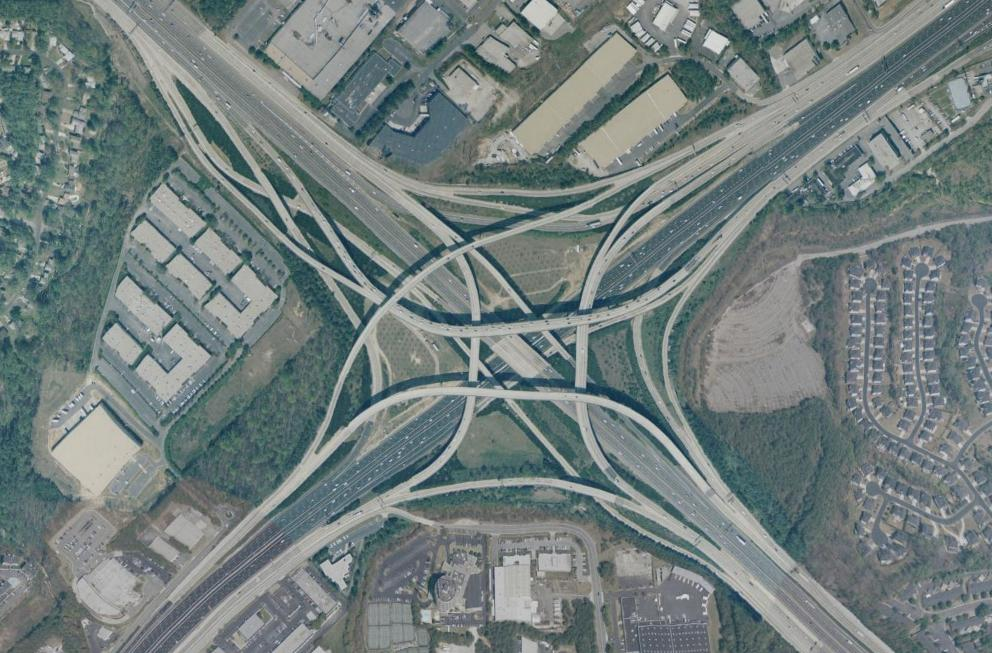
The Tom Moreland Interchange in DeKalb County, Georgia, a five level stack with frontage roads 33.892070°N 84.259110°W

- Tom Moreland Interchange, the interchange of I-85 and I-285 as well as US 23/SR 13 (Buford Highway), Chamblee-Tucker Road and Northcrest Road in DeKalb County just outside Atlanta.

==== Illinois ====
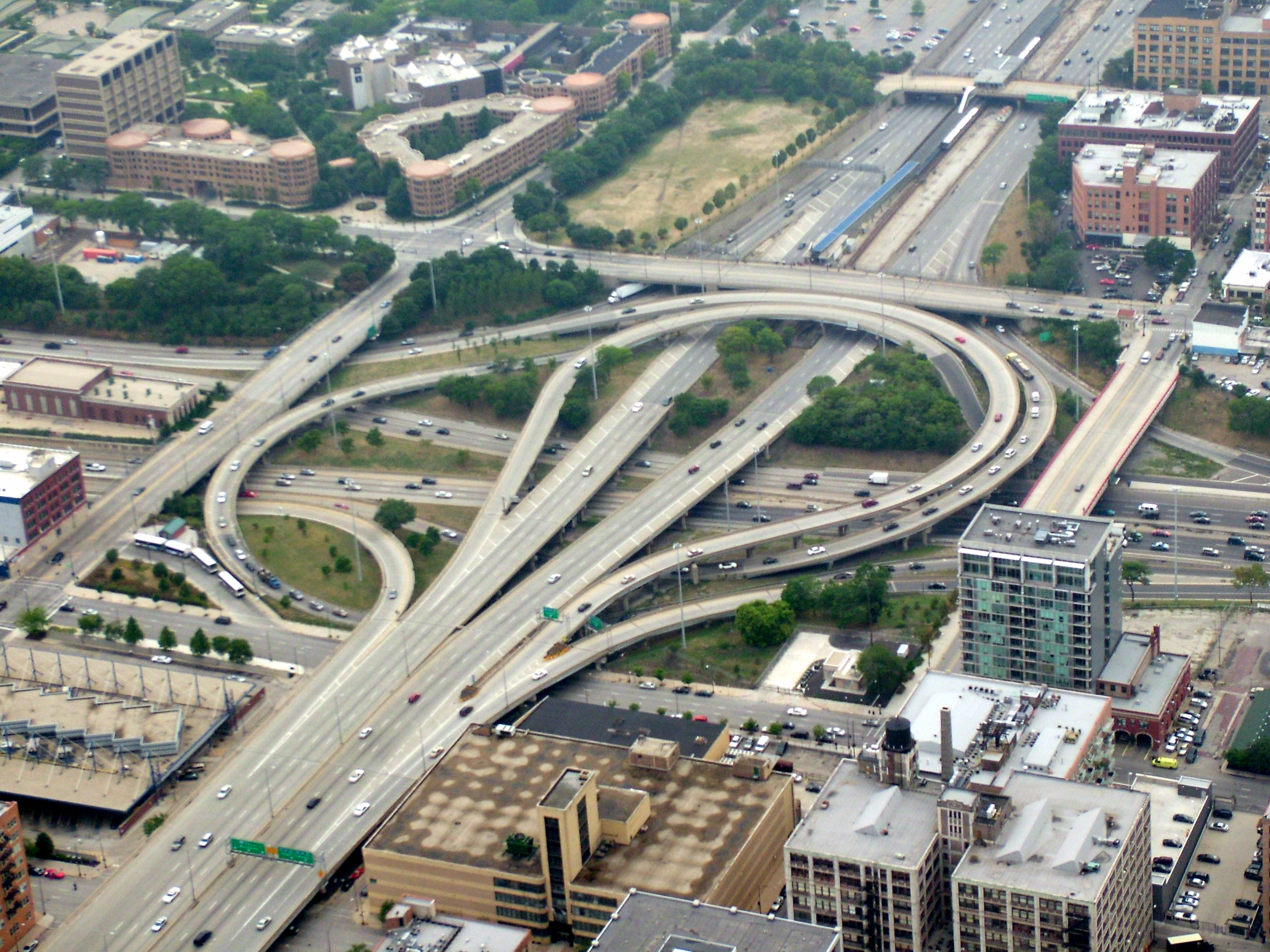
Aerial photo of the Jane Byrne Interchange, (formerly the Circle Interchange), looking southwest, Chicago

- Jane Byrne Interchange, locally known as "the spaghetti bowl", is the intersection of the Kennedy Expressway, the Dan Ryan Expressway, the Eisenhower Expressway, and Ida B. Wells Drive just southwest of downtown Chicago.

==== Indiana ====
- The concurrency between Interstate 65 and Interstate 70 in Indianapolis, particularly at the "North Split."

==== Kentucky ====
- Kennedy Interchange, the intersection of I-64, I-65, and I-71 at the northeastern edge of Downtown Louisville south of the Ohio River and including I-65's Kennedy and Lincoln Bridges.

==== Massachusetts ====
The South Bay Interchange in Boston

- The South Bay Interchange between I-90 (Massachusetts Turnpike) and I-93/US 1/MA 3 in Boston.

==== Minnesota ====
- The intersection of I-94, I-35E, US 12, and US 52 at the northeastern edge of Downtown St Paul.
- The "Can of Worms" interchange in Duluth, between I-35 and US 53/I-535.

==== Missouri ====
- The Downtown Loop interchange of 23 exits, four Interstate Highways, four U.S. Highways and numerous city streets in downtown Kansas City, Missouri.

==== Nevada ====
- Henderson Spaghetti Bowl (or the "Hender-Bender") in Henderson (I-11/US 93/US 95, I-215, Lake Mead Parkway)
- Las Vegas Spaghetti Bowl, the interchange of I-15, I-11, US 93 and US 95 in Downtown Las Vegas, which also includes access to/from Martin Luther King Jr. Boulevard.
- Reno Spaghetti Bowl, the interchange of I-80, I-580 and US 395 in Reno, which also includes access to/from Battle Born Way (formerly Kietzke Lane) and East 4th Street and Prater Way in Sparks.

==== New Jersey ====
- Exit 53 on I-80 where the highway meets with US 46 and Route 23
- Exit 127 the Garden State Parkway where the highway meets US 9, Route 440, Smith Rd, and Riverside Drive north of the Driscoll Bridge

==== New York ====
- Bruckner Interchange in The Bronx (I-95, I-278, I-295, I-678, Hutchinson River Parkway, and Bruckner Boulevard)
- Kew Gardens Interchange in Queens (NY-25, I-678, Grand Central Parkway, Jackie Robinson Parkway, and Union Turnpike)

==== Pennsylvania ====
- The intersection of I-81 and Route 22

==== Tennessee ====
- Malfunction Junction, the interchange between I-275 (formerly I-75) and I-40 in Knoxville, Tennessee
- The interchange between I-65 and I-440 in Nashville.

==== Texas ====
- Spaghetti Bowl, where I-45, Allen Parkway, Memorial Drive, Houston Avenue, McKinney Street, Dallas Street, and Pierce Street meet in Downtown Houston.
- The "High-Five" in Dallas.
- Spaghetti Bowl, where I-10, I-110, and US 54 meet just east of Downtown El Paso, Texas.

==== Utah ====
- Spaghetti Bowl, where I-15, I-80, and State Route 201 meet in the cities of Salt Lake City and South Salt Lake. This interchange also has access to 2100 South and 900 West.

==== Virginia ====
- Springfield Interchange in Springfield, Virginia, commonly known as the "Mixing Bowl" (I-95, I-395, I-495, and SR 644)

== See also ==
- Magic Roundabout
- Malfunction Junction (disambiguation)
- Mixing Bowl
- Spaghetti code
- Stack interchange
