= University of Duisburg =

The old University of Duisburg was a university in Duisburg, Germany.

== History ==
Its origins date back to the 1555 decision to create a university for the unified duchies at the Lower Rhine that were later to be merged into Prussia. After the foundation of an academic college in 1559, a university was founded in 1655 by Frederick William, Elector of Brandenburg, the "Great Elector". The university had four faculties: Theology, Medicine, Law and Arts. During its period of activity it was one of the central and leading universities of the western provinces of Prussia. In the time the university existed many famous men graduated (listed in the German version of this article). It existed until 1818, when it was closed by King Frederick William III of Prussia. At the same time the University of Bonn was founded, which was given most of the library of the closed down University of Duisburg.

In 1968, the university was founded again in Duisburg, related to the old one, bearing the name: Comprehensive University of Duisburg. Initially only small, the university was developed rapidly in the 1970s up to about 15.000 students. The Comprehensive University of Duisburg was given the name of Gerhard Mercator in 1994. In 2003, the Gerhard Mercator University merged with the University of Essen to form the University of Duisburg-Essen, which is today one of the largest universities in Germany with about 40,000 students.

== See also ==
- List of early modern universities in Europe
