= Joachim Erwin =

Mayor of Düsseldorf from 1999 to 2008

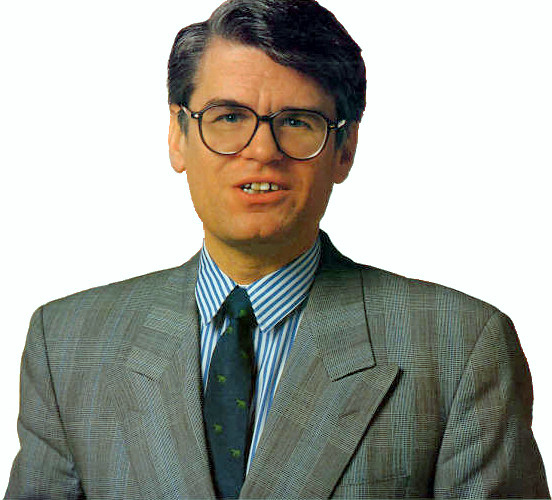

Mayor of Düsseldorf
- In office 12 September 1999 – 20 May 2008 (his death)
- Preceded by: Marie-Luise Smeets
- Succeeded by: Dirk Elbers

Member of the Landtag of North Rhine-Westphalia
- In office 7 June 1988 – 30 May 1990

Personal details
- Born: 2 September 1949 Stadtroda, Germany
- Died: 20 May 2008 (aged 58) Düsseldorf, Germany
- Resting place: Nordfriedhof, Düsseldorf, Germany
- Party: Christian Democratic Union
- Spouse: Hille Erwin
- Children: Markus Erwin; Angela Erwin
- Education: Ruhr University Bochum
- Occupation: lawyer
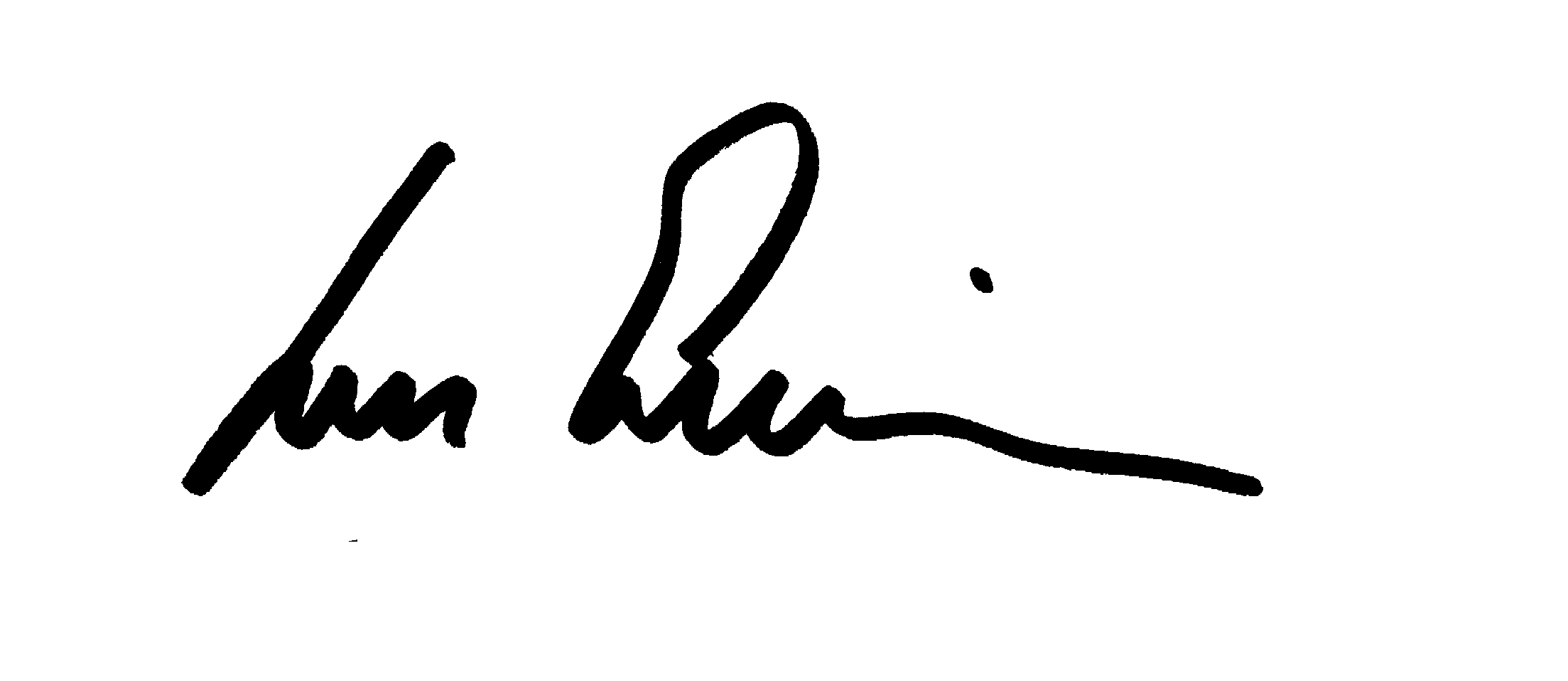
- Signature

Joachim Erwin (2 September 1949 – 20 May 2008) was a German politician and the Mayor of Düsseldorf from 1999 until his death in 2008. He was born in Stadtroda, Thuringia, Germany.

Erwin was a member of the Christian Democratic Union (CDU). Erwin was married with Hille Erwin and had two children.

Erwin was elected Mayor of Düsseldorf in 1999. He was credited with helping the city of Düsseldorf get rid of its pressing debts by selling off certain assets, such as its stake in the RWE AG utility during his tenure in office. He also successfully led the effort to cut spending from Düsseldorf's budget. (The city of Düsseldorf is currently populated by approximately 577,000 people and serves as headquarters to several major companies, including E.ON AG and Metro AG, which is Germany's largest retailer.

Joachim Erwin died on 20 May 2008 of colorectal cancer in Düsseldorf at the age of 58.
