= Rheinufer Tunnel =

Road tunnel in Düsseldorf, Germany

Coordinates: 51°13′49″N 6°46′17″E

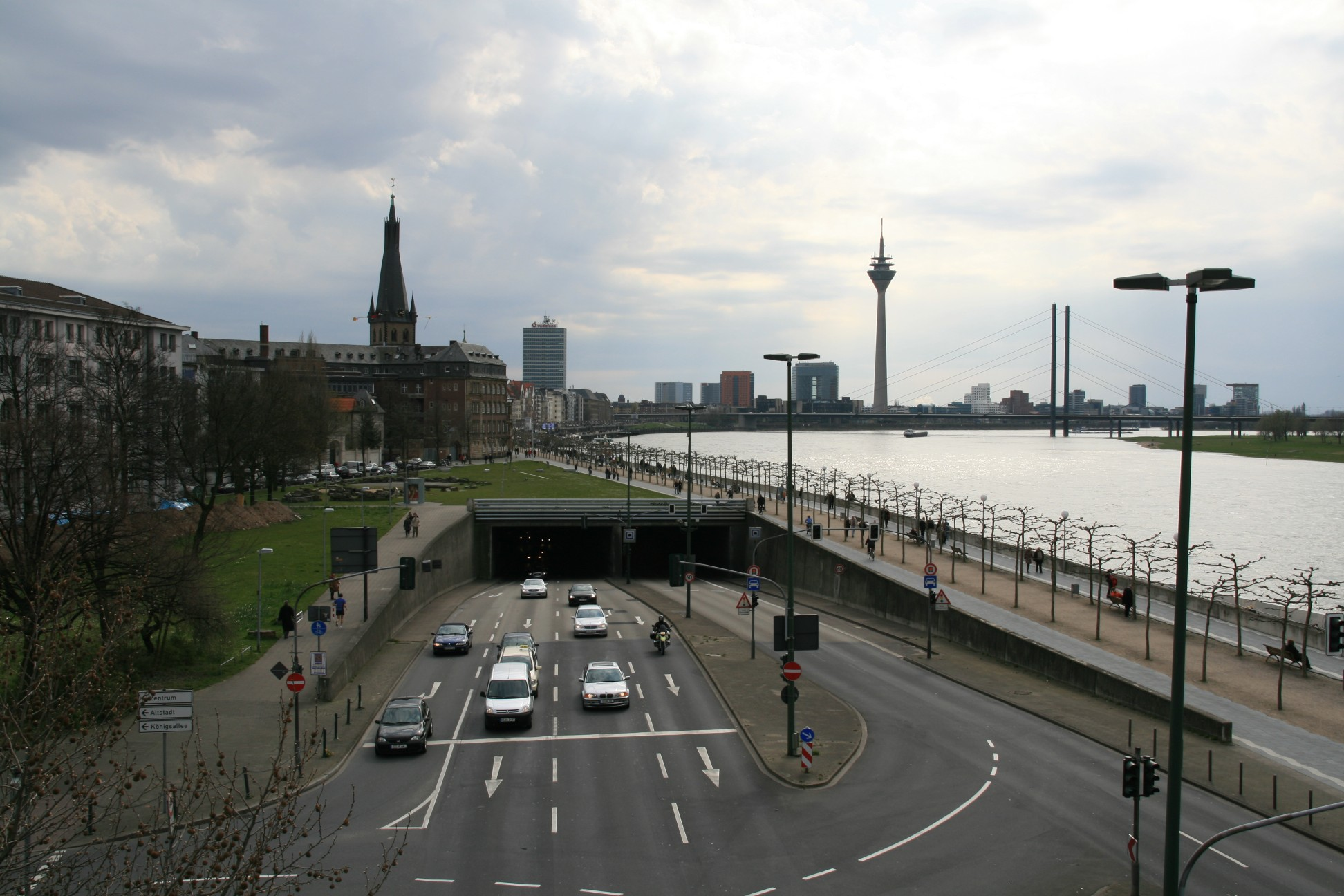
Entrance to the Rheinufertunnel

The Rheinufer Tunnel (German: Rheinufertunnel or "Rhine Bank Tunnel") is a road tunnel in Düsseldorf, Germany. Built between 1990 and 1993 at a cost of 550 million Deutschmarks, the tunnel is part of the B1 German federal road. At 2 km (1.2 mi) long, it is the sixth longest inner city tunnel in Europe.

The tunnel runs under the Rheinuferpromenade (Rhine Bank Promenade) near the right hand bank of the Rhine. The impressive southern entrance of the tunnel is marked by a tall building, the Düsseldorf Stadttor (city gate). The northern entrance is just south of the Oberkassel Bridge.

== See also ==
- Kunst im Tunnel
