= Stephan Keller (politician) =

German politician (born 1970)

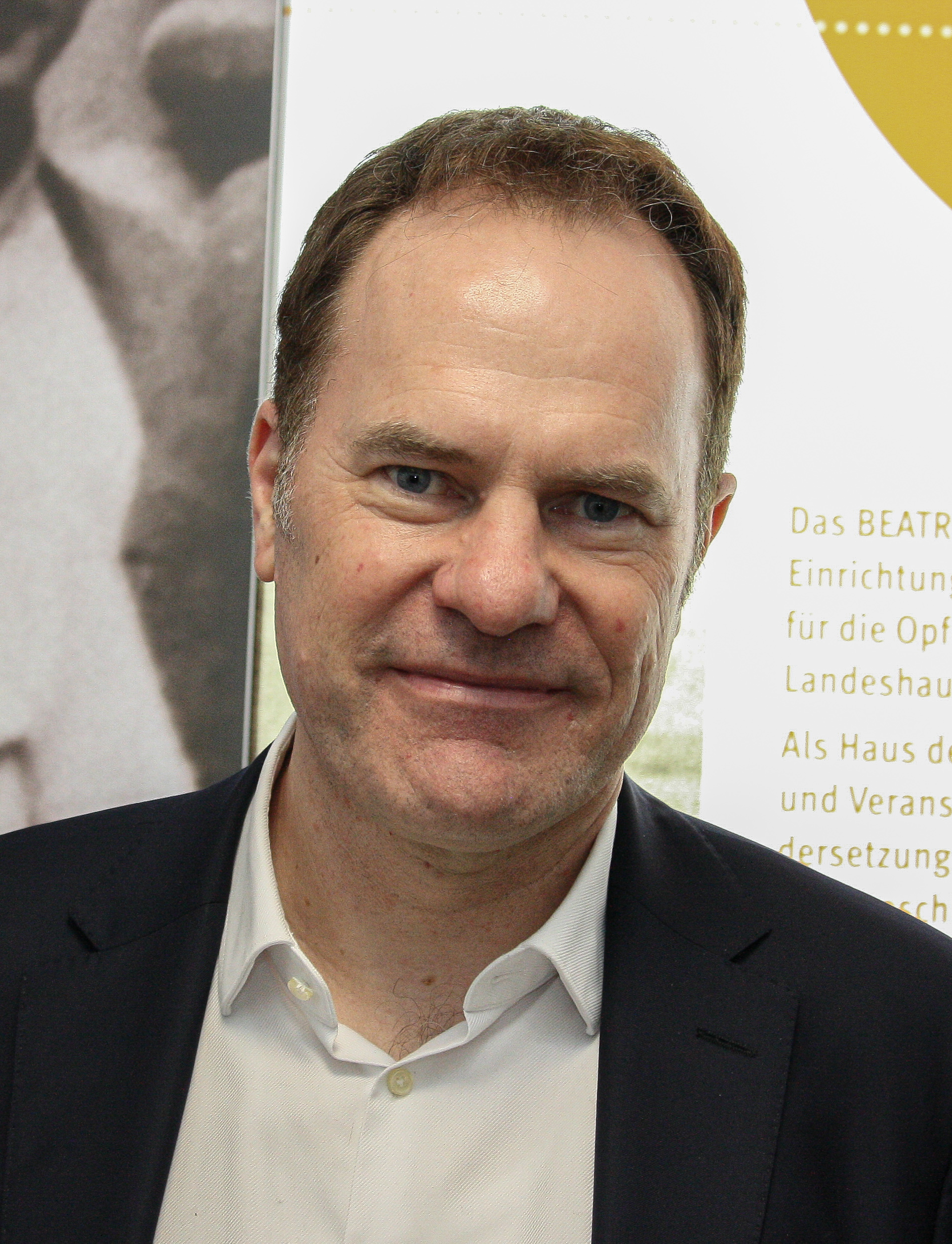
- Keller in 2025

Mayor of Düsseldorf
- Incumbent
- Assumed office 1 November 2020
- Preceded by: Thomas Geisel

Personal details
- Born: 18 September 1970 (age 55) Aachen
- Party: Christian Democratic Union

Stephan Keller (born 18 September 1970 in Aachen) is a German politician serving as mayor of Düsseldorf since 2020. From 2017 to 2020, he served as city manager and deputy mayor of Cologne.
