= Willi Becker =

German politician (1918–1977)

Willi Becker (January 11, 1918 in Wallmenroth – January 25, 1977 in Düsseldorf) was a German politician, representative of the Social Democratic Party. Because of a disease Becker committed suicide.

== Life ==
After the sudden death of Georg Glock as Lord Mayor of Düsseldorf in December 1959 Becker was determined by his party's successor in January 1960. At the next regular municipal election in March 1961, the CDU strongest faction in the city council was again, and Becker handed the office of the Mayor of Fritz Vomfelde.

From March 1961 to 1964 Becker held the office of mayor before he was elected mayor again in September 1964. In the fall of 1974 he resigned for health reasons. From 1966 to 1970 Becker was also a member of the North Rhine-Westphalian State Parliament.

On January 25 of 1977 due to a serious illness Willi Becker committed suicide.

== See also ==
- List of Social Democratic Party of Germany politicians
