= Dirk Elbers =

German politician

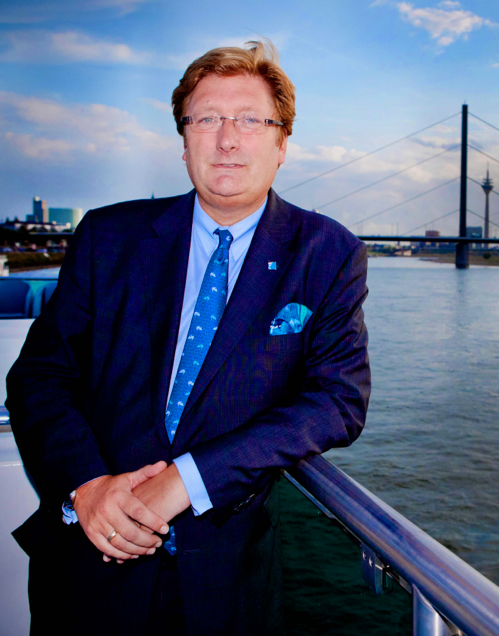
Dirk Elbers 2011, Rhine, Düsseldorf 2011

Dirk Elbers (born 11 December 1959) German politician, representative of the German Christian Democratic Union.

After the death of Lord Mayor Joachim Erwin, who died in office, on 2 June 2008 Elbers was a candidate for the CDU to become mayor. The election took place on 31 August 2008. Dirk Elbers won this election on the first ballot with 59.7% of the vote against his candidate against Karin Kortmann from the SPD. The turnout was around 38%.

== See also ==
- List of German Christian Democratic Union politicians
