= Dortmund =

City in North Rhine-Westphalia, Germany

Dortmund Düörpm (Westphalian)
- City
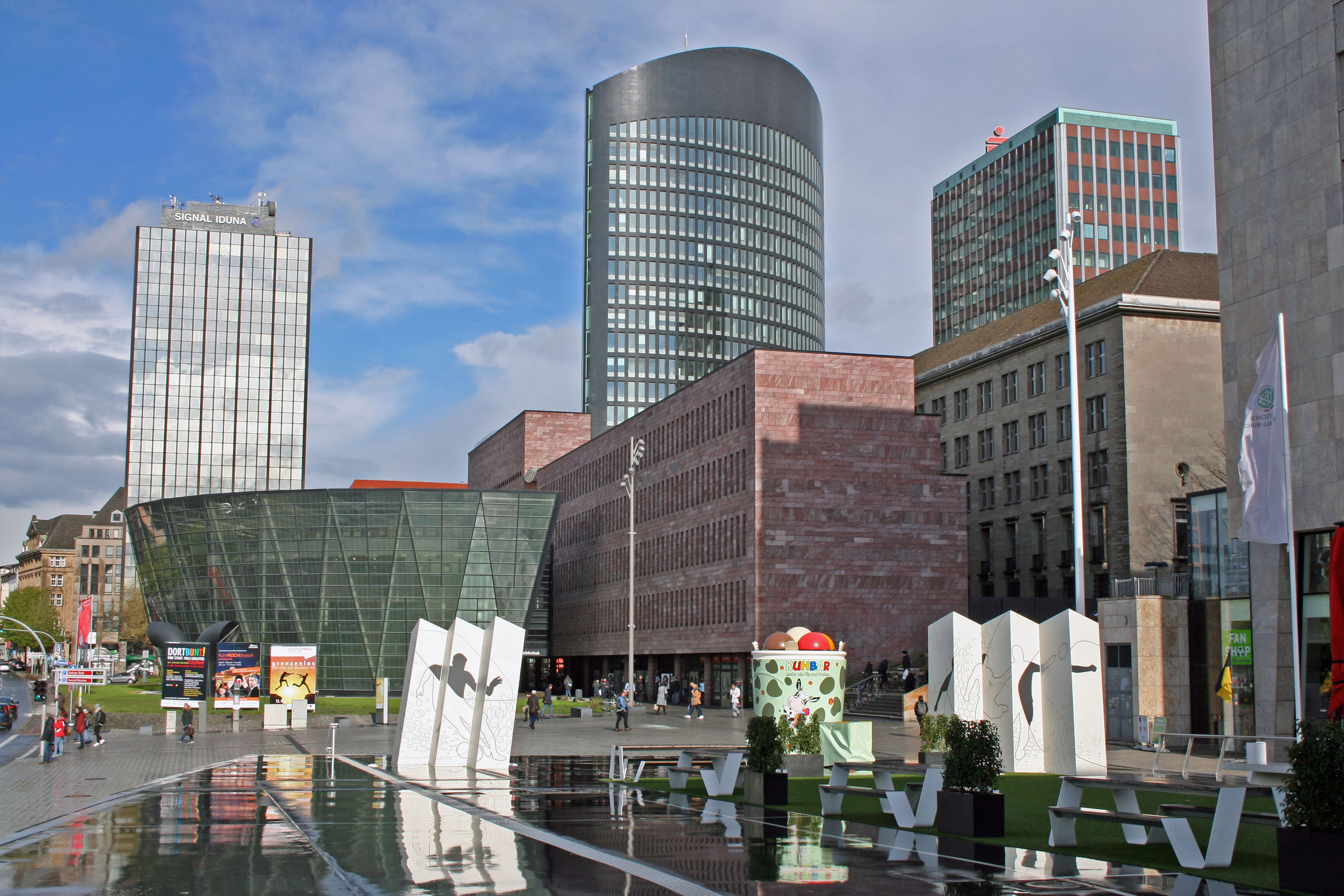
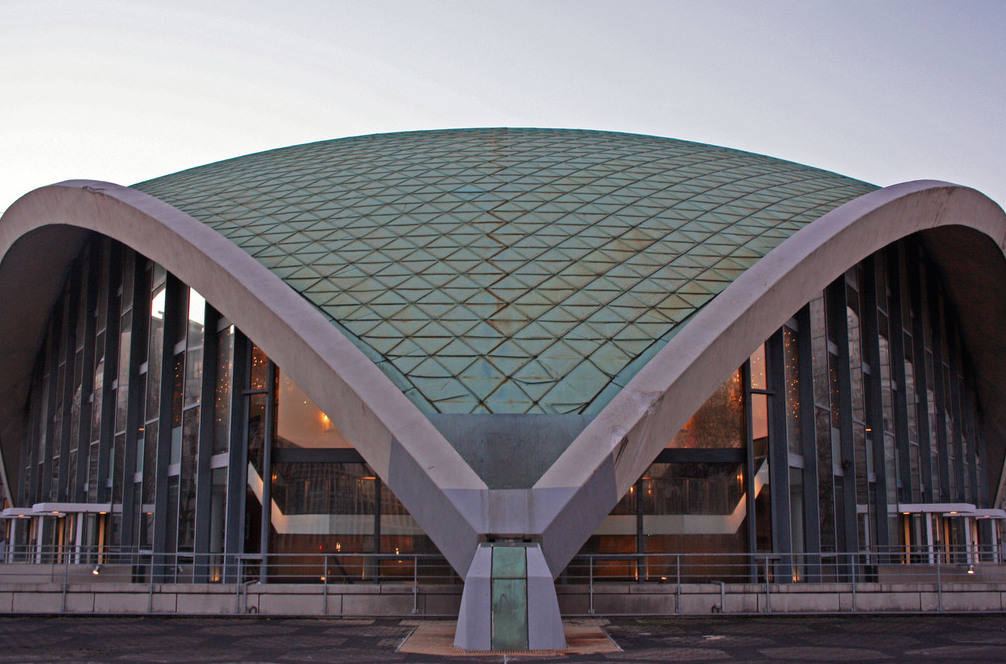
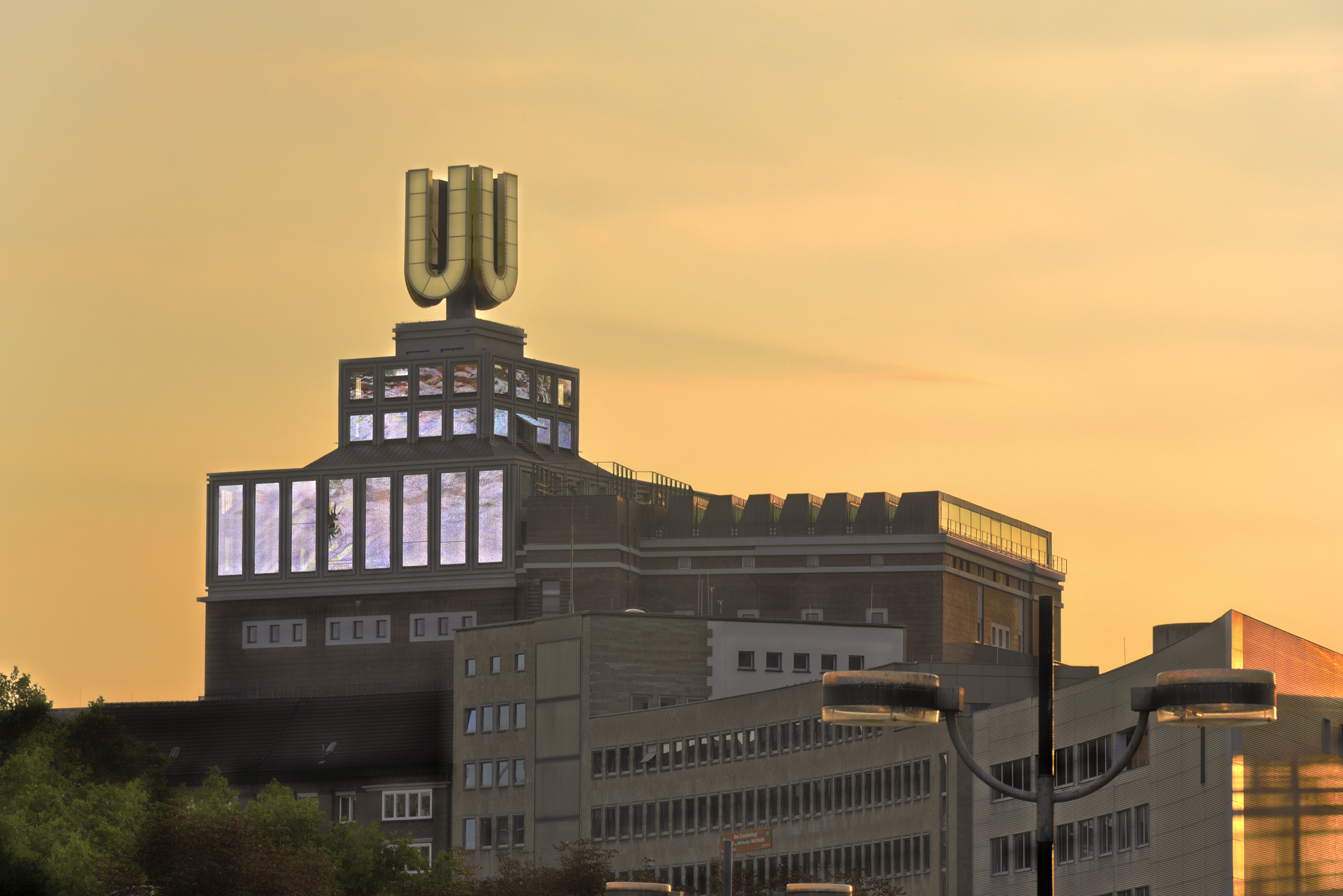
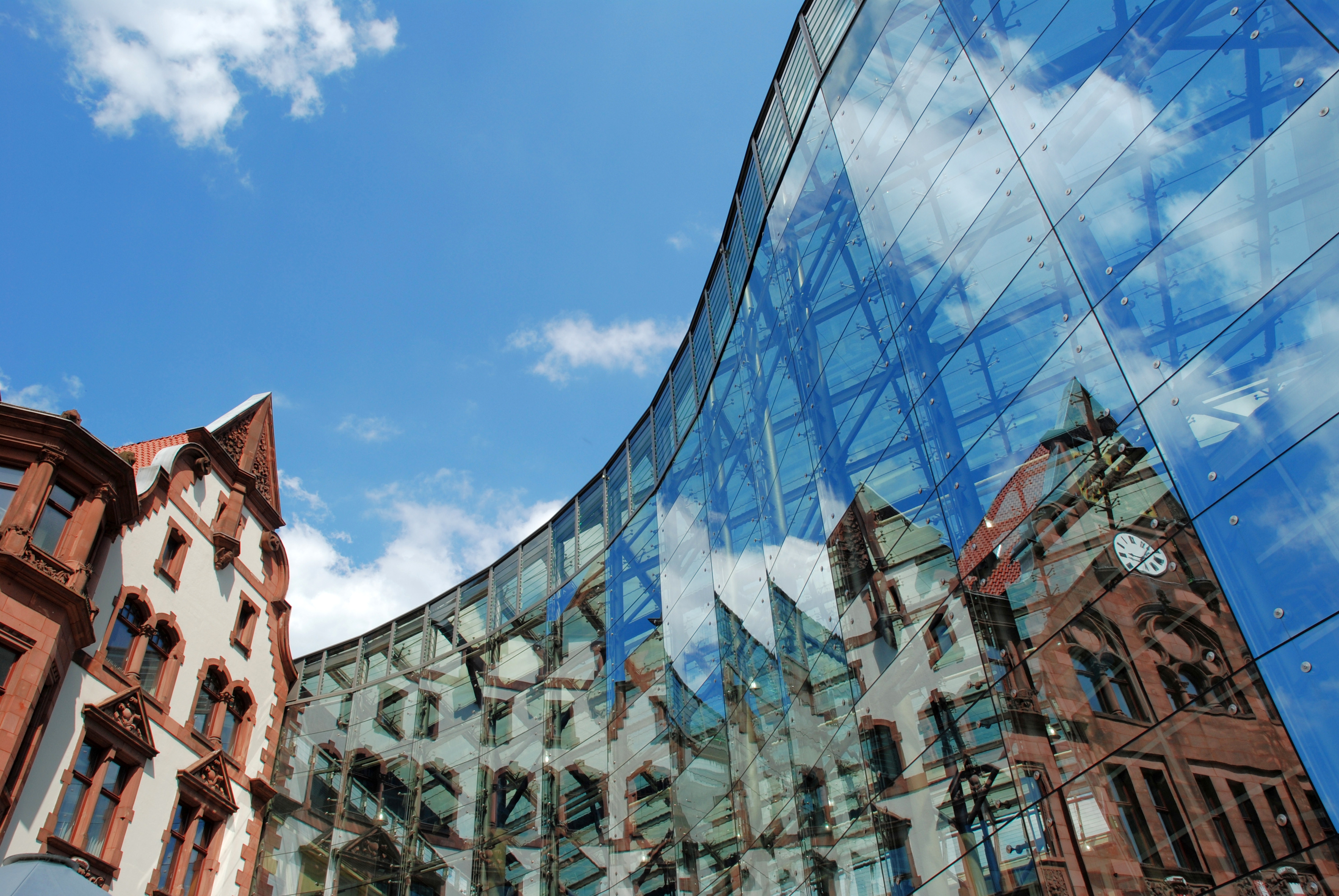
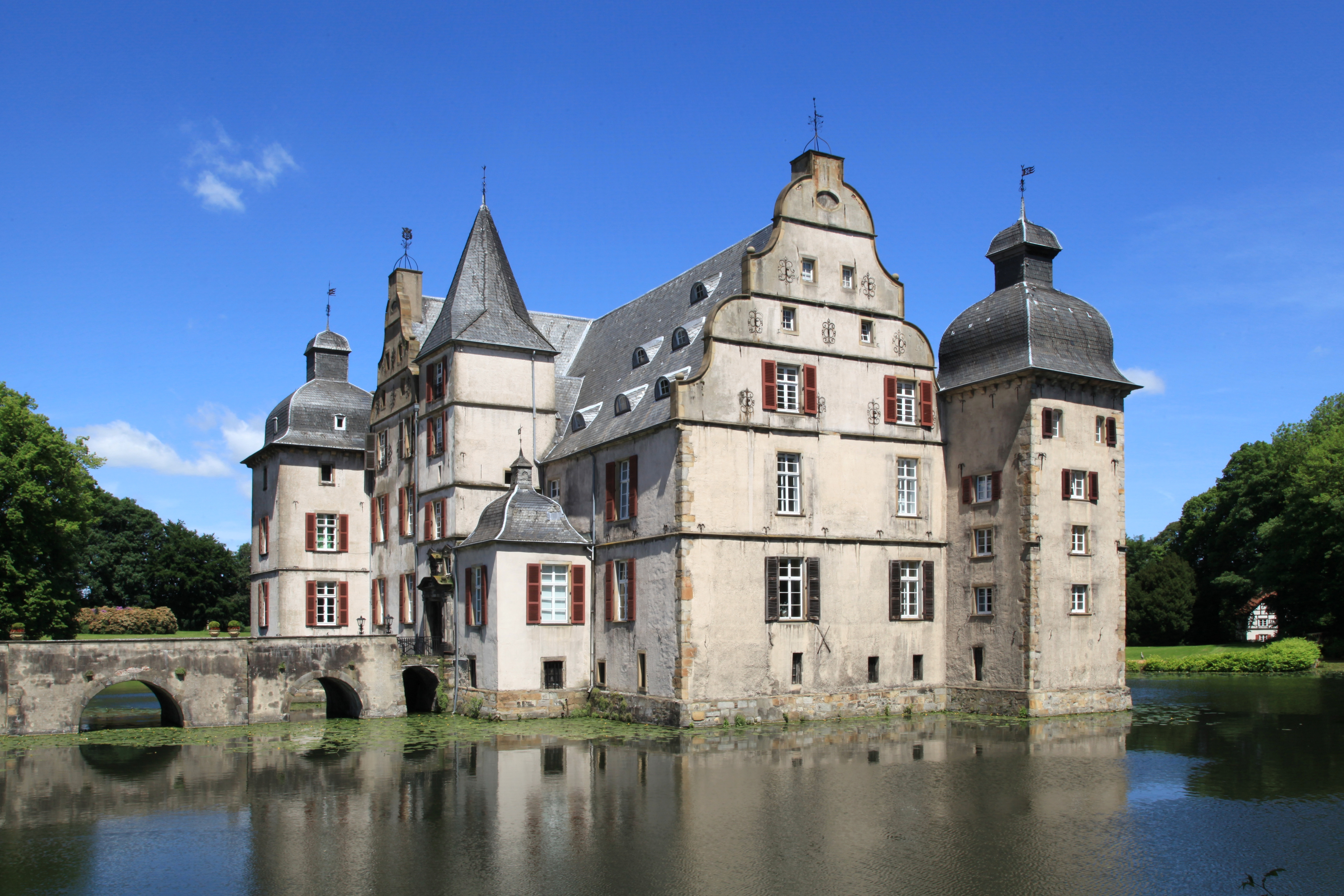
- Platz der Deutschen Einheit Opera House U-Tower Altes Stadthaus Zollern II/IV Colliery St. Reinold's Church Bodelschwingh Castle

- Flag Coat of arms

- Location of Dortmund within North Rhine-Westphalia
- Interactive map of Dortmund
- Location within Germany Location within North Rhine-Westphalia
- Coordinates: 51°30′50″N 7°27′55″E
- Country: Germany
- State: North Rhine-Westphalia
- Admin. region: Arnsberg
- District: Urban district
- Founded: 882; 1144 years ago

Government
  - Mayor (2025–30): Alexander Omar Kalouti (CDU)
  - Governing parties: CDU

Area
  - City: 280.71 km^{2} (108.38 sq mi)
  - Metro: 7,268 km^{2} (2,806 sq mi)
- Elevation: 86 m (282 ft)

Population (2025-12-31)
  - City: 600,880
  - Density: 2,140.6/km^{2} (5,544.1/sq mi)
  - Urban: 5,302,179 (Ruhr)
  - Metro: 11,300,000 (Rhine-Ruhr)
- Time zone: UTC+01:00 (CET)
  - Summer (DST): UTC+02:00 (CEST)
- Postal codes: 44001-44388
- Dialling codes: 0231, 02304
- Vehicle registration: DO
- Website: www.dortmund.de

Dortmund (German: [ˈdɔʁtmʊnt]; Westphalian: Düörpm [ˈdyːœɐ̯pm̩]) is the third-largest city in North Rhine-Westphalia, after Cologne and Düsseldorf, and the ninth-largest city in Germany. With a population of 614,495 inhabitants, it is the largest city (by area and population) of the Ruhr as well as the largest city of Westphalia. (Note: The historical capital and cultural centre of Westphalia is however Münster.) It lies on the Emscher and Ruhr rivers (tributaries of the Rhine) in the Rhine-Ruhr Metropolitan Region, the second biggest metropolitan region by GDP in the European Union, and is the administrative, commercial, and cultural centre of the eastern Ruhr. Dortmund is the second-largest city in the Low German dialect area, after Hamburg.

Founded around 882, Dortmund became an Imperial Free City. Throughout the 13th to 14th centuries, it was the "chief city" of the Rhine, Westphalia, and the Netherlands Circle of the Hanseatic League. During the Thirty Years' War, the city was destroyed and decreased in significance until the onset of industrialisation. The city then became one of Germany's most important coal, steel, and beer centres. It was one of the most heavily bombed cities in Germany during World War II. The devastating bombing raids of 12 March 1945 destroyed 98% of the buildings in the inner city. Involving more than 1,110 aircraft, the raids were the largest targeting a single city during World War II. Today, around 30% of the city's buildings date from before the war.

Since the collapse of its century-long steel and coal industries, the region has adapted and shifted to high-technology biomedical technology, micro systems technology, and also services. Other key sectors include retail, leisure and the visitor economy, creative industries, and logistics. With its central station and airport, the third-busiest in North Rhine-Westphalia, Dortmund is an important transport junction for the surrounding Ruhr area as well as the Benelux countries. Dortmund Port is the largest canal port in Europe and has a connection to important seaports on the North Sea.

Dortmund is home to several institutions of higher education, including the Technical University of Dortmund, the Dortmund University of Applied Sciences and Arts, and the International School of Management. The city's cultural institutions include the Museum Ostwall, Museum of Art and Cultural History, and German Football Museum, as well as theatres and music venues like the Theater Dortmund or the Dortmund Opera House. Nearly half the municipal territory consists of waterways, woodland, agriculture, and green spaces with spacious parks such as Westfalenpark and Rombergpark. This stands in a stark contrast with nearly a hundred years of extensive coal mining and steel milling in the past, which created a rich Gründerzeit architectural heritage. Borussia Dortmund is one of the most successful German football clubs.

== Etymology ==
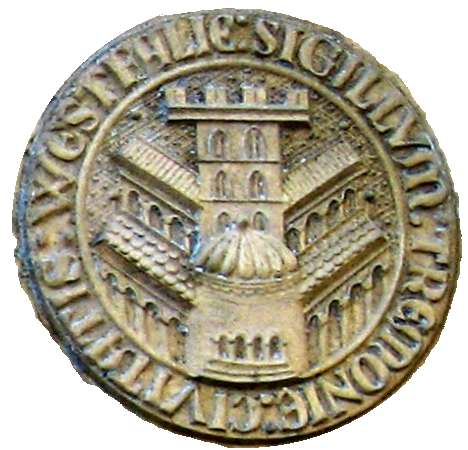
"Seal of Dortmund, the city of Westphalia" Latin: Sigillum Tremonie Civitatis Westfalie

Dortmund was first mentioned in the Werden Abbey, which was built between 880 and 884. The Latin entry reads: In Throtmanni liber homo Arnold viii den nob solvit (German: In Throtmanni zahlt uns der freie Mann Arnold 8 Pfennige, and English: In Throtmanni the free man Arnold pays us 8 pfennigs). According to this, there are a large number of different names, but they all go back to the same phoneme stem. Their respective use in the sources appears arbitrary and random.

Dortmund first appears in records around 890 under the name Throtmanni, later documented in 947 as Throtmennia, between 1033 and 1050 as moneta Thrutminensis, and in 1074 as Drutmunne. From the 13th century on, the Dortmunde appeared for the first time, but it was not until a few centuries later that it became generally accepted.

In 1389, when the city had withstood a siege of 1,200 knights led by the Archbishop of Cologne, it adopted a motto that is still upheld today by traditional societies: So fast as Düörpm (Westphalian: 'as firm as Dortmund').

In the past, the city was called Dortmond in Dutch, Tremonia in Spanish, and Trémoigne in Old French. However, these exonyms have fallen into disuse and the city is now internationally known by its German name of Dortmund. The common abbreviation for the name of the city is "DTM", the IATA code for Dortmund Airport.

== History ==
=== Early history ===
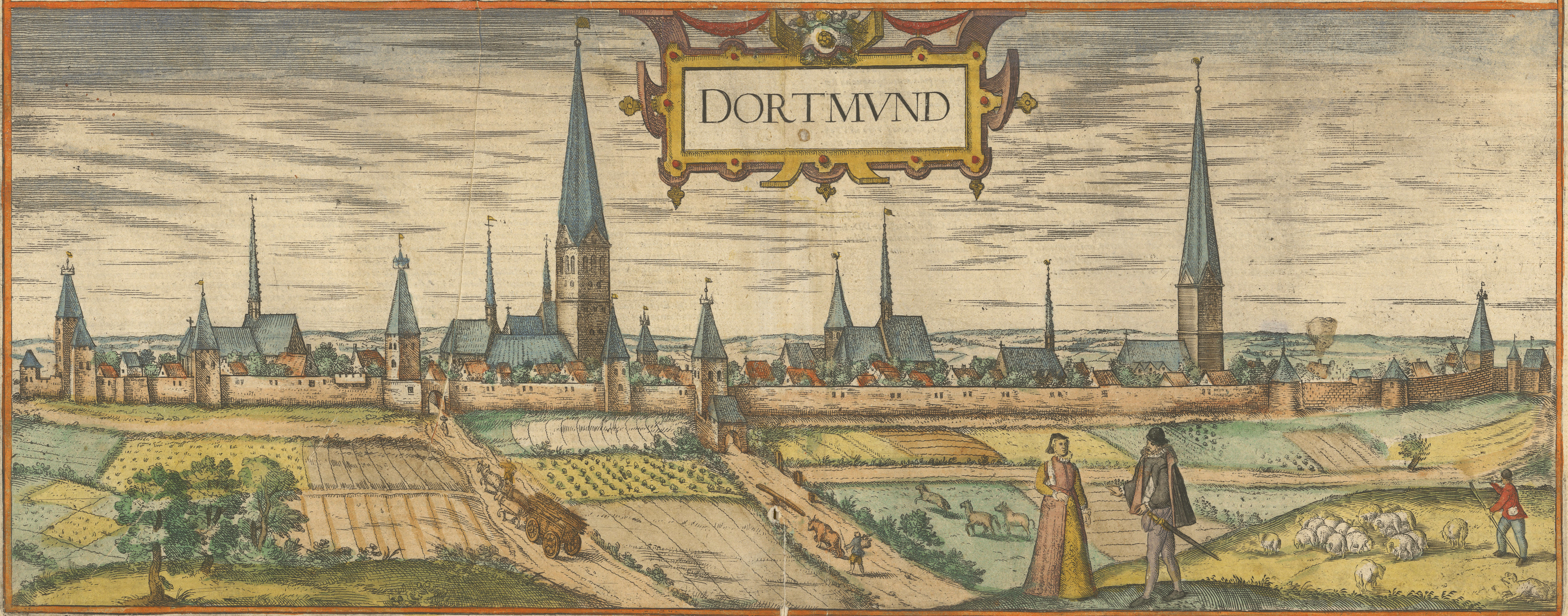
Historical view of Dortmund by Georg Braun and Franz Hogenberg (between 1572 and 1618)

The Sigiburg was a hillfort in the south of present-day Dortmund, overlooking the River Ruhr near its confluence with the River Lenne. The ruins of the later Hohensyburg castle now stand on the site of the Sigiburg. The hillfort is presumably of Saxon origin, but there is no archeological or documentary proof of this. During the Saxon Wars, it was taken by the Franks under Charlemagne in 772, retaken by the Saxons (possibly under Widukind) in 774, and taken again and refortified by Charlemagne in 775. Archaeological evidence suggests the Sigiburg site was also occupied in the Neolithic era.

The first time Dortmund was mentioned in official documents was around 882 as Throtmanni – In throtmanni liber homo arnold[us] viii den[arios] nob[is] soluit [solvit]. In 1005 the "Ecclesiastical council" and in 1016 the "Imperial diet" met in Dortmund.

=== Middle Ages and early modern period ===
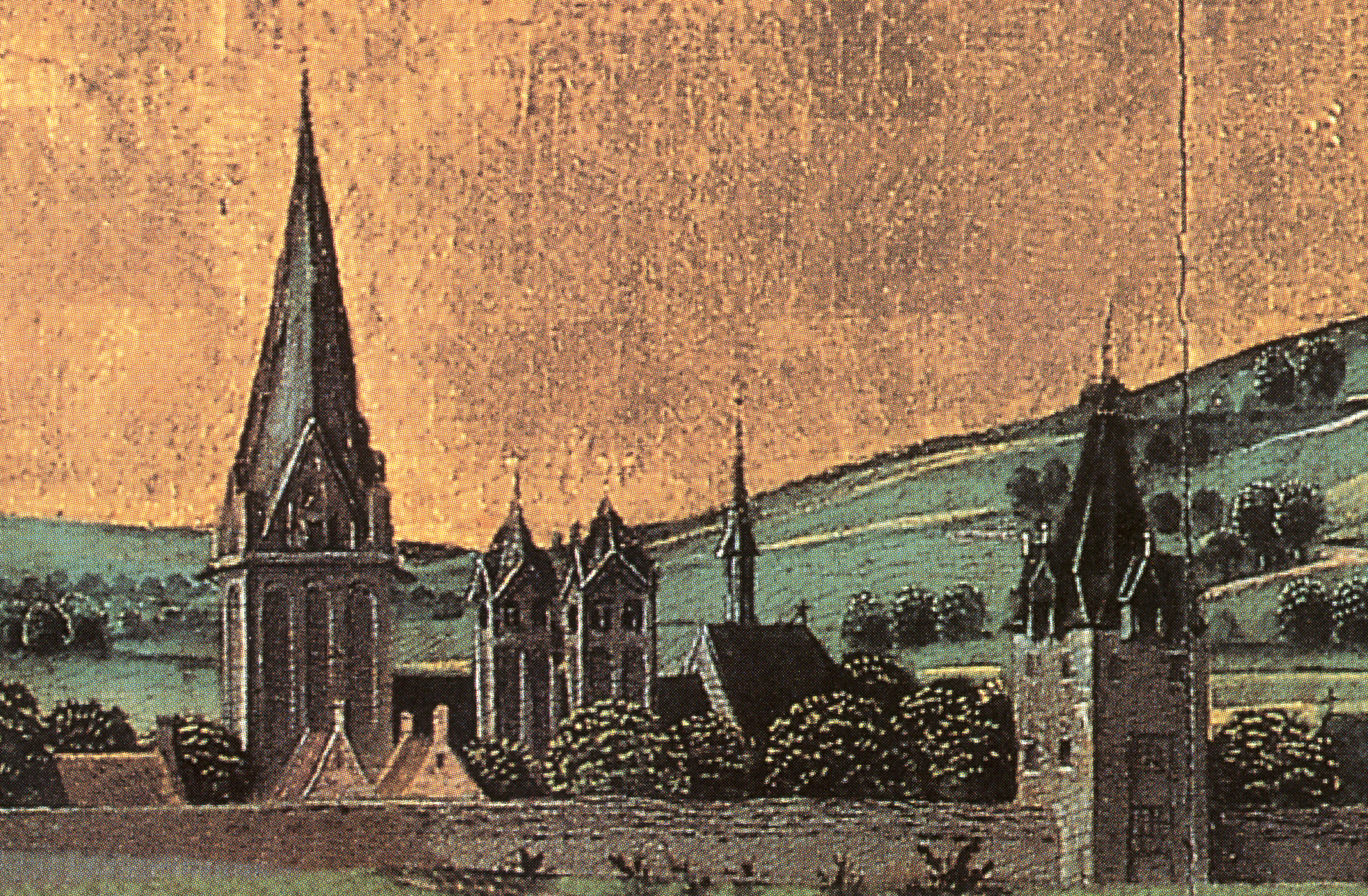
St. Marys and St. Reinolds in 1470

After it was destroyed by a fire, the Holy Roman Emperor Frederick I (Barbarossa) had the town rebuilt in 1152 and resided there (among other places) for two years. In 1267 St. Mary's Church, Dortmund, and three years later in 1270 St. Reinold's Church first mentioned. The combination of crossroad, market place, administrative centre – town hall, made Dortmund an important centre in Westphalia. It became an Imperial Free City and one of the first cities in Europe with an official Brewing right in 1293. Throughout the 13th to 14th centuries, it was the "chief city" of the Rhine, Westphalia, the Netherlands Circle of the Hanseatic League.

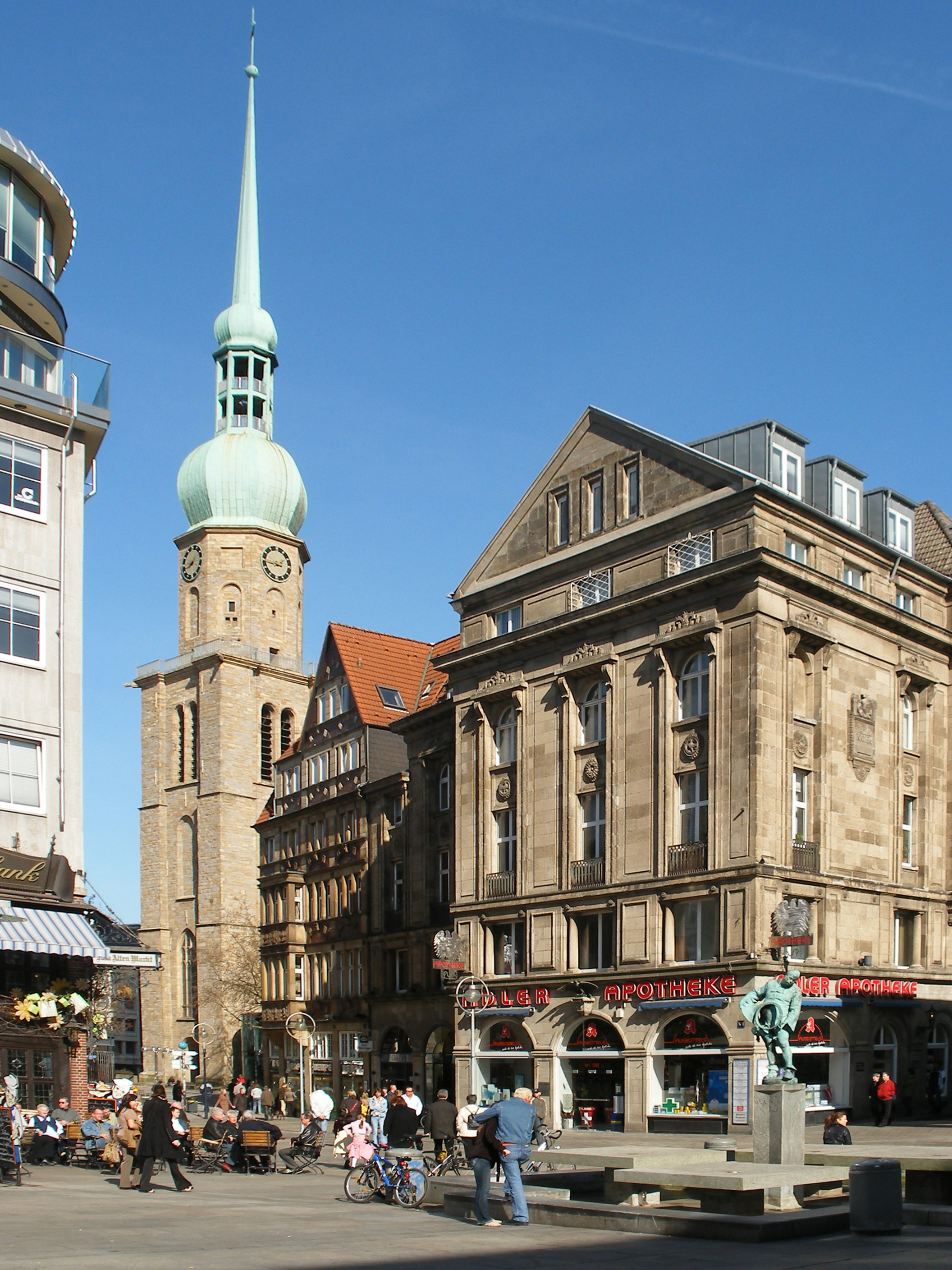
Old market St. Reinolds

After 1320, the city appeared in writing as "Dorpmunde". In the years leading up to 1344, the English King, Edward III, even borrowed money from well-heeled Dortmund merchant families Berswordt and Klepping, offering the regal crown as security. In 1388, the Count of Mark joined forces with the Archbishop of Cologne and issued declarations of a feud against the town. Following a major siege lasting 18 months, peace negotiations took place and Dortmund emerged victorious. In 1400 the seat of the first Vehmic court (German: Freistuhl) was in Dortmund, in a square between two linden trees, one of which was known as the Femelinde. With the growing influence of Cologne during the 15th century, the seat was moved to Arnsberg in 1437. After Cologne was excluded after the Anglo-Hanseatic War (1470–74), Dortmund was made capital of the Rhine-Westphalian and Netherlands Circle. This favors the founding of one of the oldest schools in Europe in 1543 – Stadtgymnasium Dortmund. In 1661 an earthquake made the Reinoldikirche collapse.

=== 18th, 19th and early 20th centuries ===
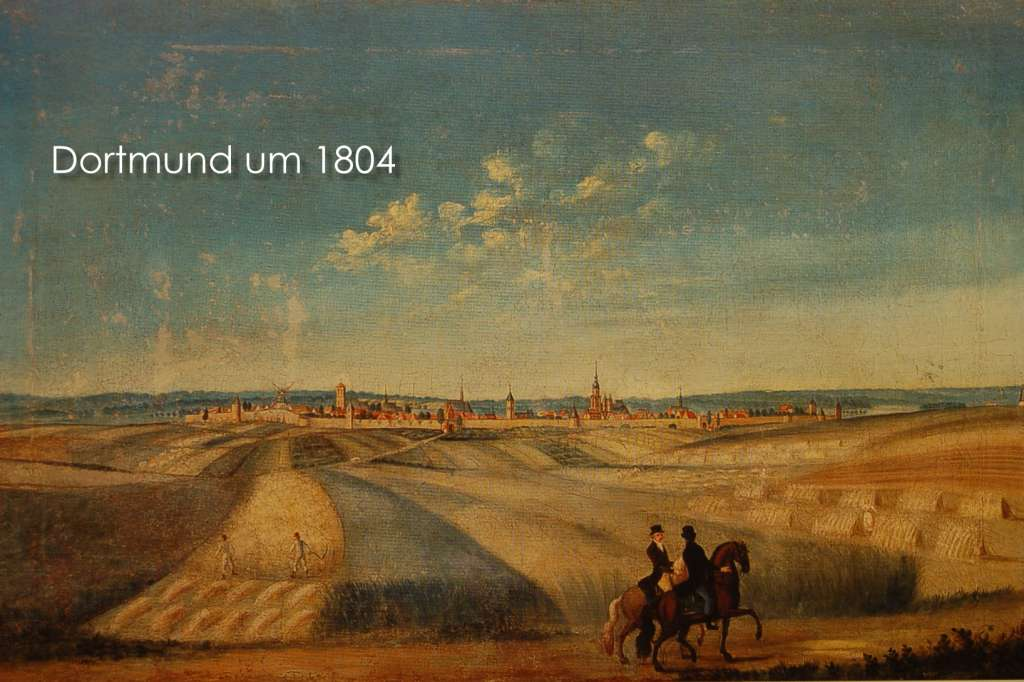
Pre-industrial Dortmund in 1804

With the Reichsdeputationshauptschluss resolution in 1803, Dortmund was added to the Principality of Nassau-Orange-Fulda, with as a result that it was no longer a free imperial city. William V, Prince of Orange-Nassau did not want stolen areas and therefore let his son Prince Willem Frederik (the later King William I of the Netherlands) take possession of the city and the principality. This prince held its entry on 30 June 1806, and as such the County of Dortmund then became part of the principality. On 12 July 1806, most of the Nassau principalities were deprived of their sovereign rights by means of the Rhine treaty. In October of the same year, the County of Dortmund was occupied by French troops and was added to the Grand Duchy of Berg on 1 March 1808. It is the capital of the Ruhr department. In 1808 Dortmund becomes capital of French satellite Ruhr (department). At the Congress of Vienna in 1815, the entire Grand Duchy of Berg, including Dortmund, was added to the Kingdom of Prussia. The state mining authority of the Ruhr area was founded in 1815 and moved from Bochum to Dortmund. Within the Prussian Province of Westphalia, Dortmund was a district seat within Regierungsbezirk Arnsberg until 1875, when it became an urban district within the region.

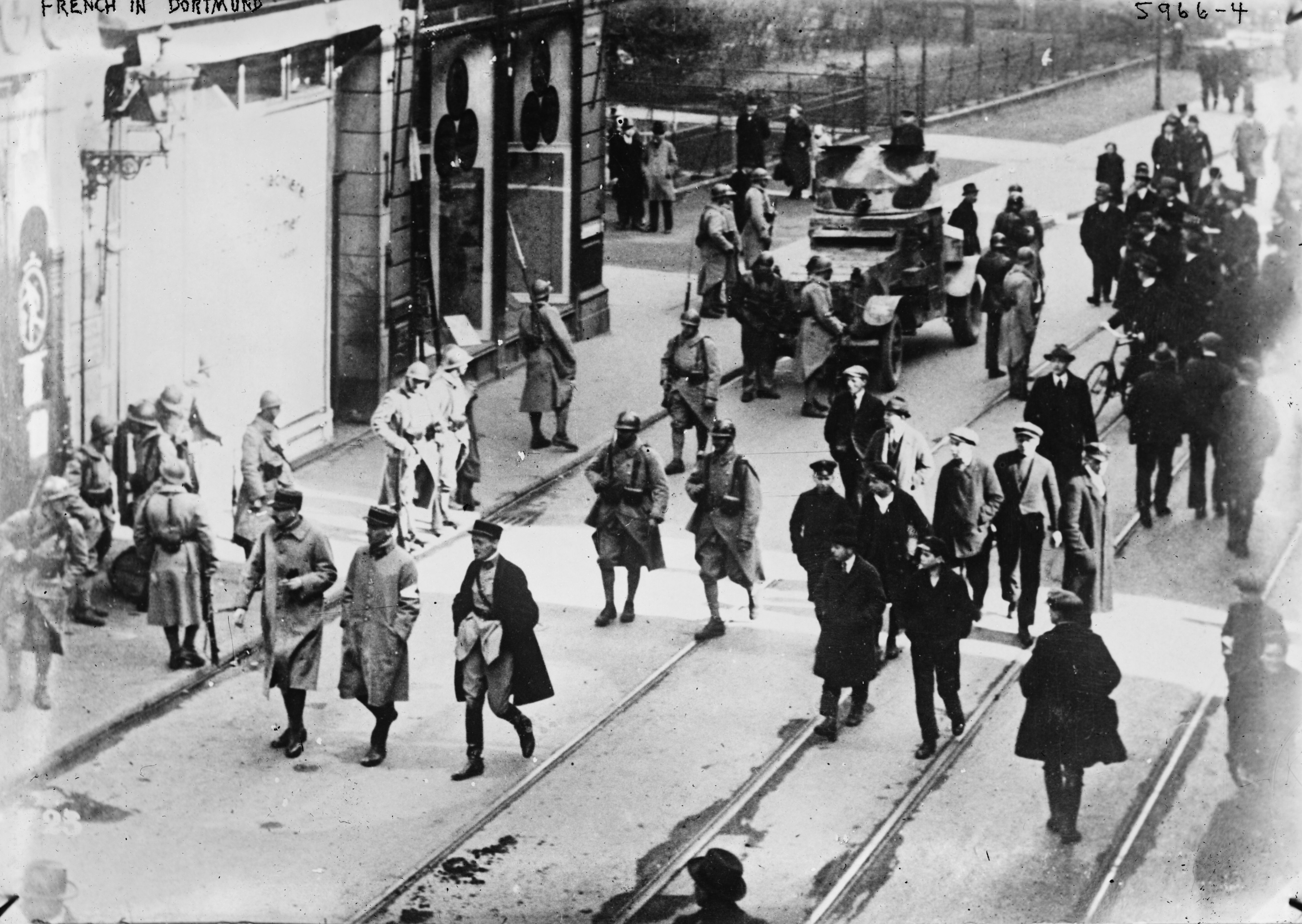
French troops in Dortmund c. 1923–1925

During the industrialisation of Prussia, Dortmund became a major centre for coal and steel. The town expanded into a city, with the population rising from 57,742 in 1875 to 379,950 in 1905. Sprawling residential areas like the North, East, Union and Kreuz district sprang up in less than 10 years. In 1920, Dortmund was one of the centres for resistance to the Kapp Putsch – a right-wing military coup launched against the Social Democratic-led government. In the Ruhr uprising, radical workers formed the 50,000-man Ruhr Red Army in hopes of setting up a soviet-style government. They were defeated with considerable loss of life by government and Freikorps units. On 11 January 1923, French and Belgian troops occupied the Ruhr. French Prime Minister Raymond Poincaré was responding to Germany's failure to comply with the reparations demands of the Treaty of Versailles. The occupation lasted until August 1925.

=== World War II ===
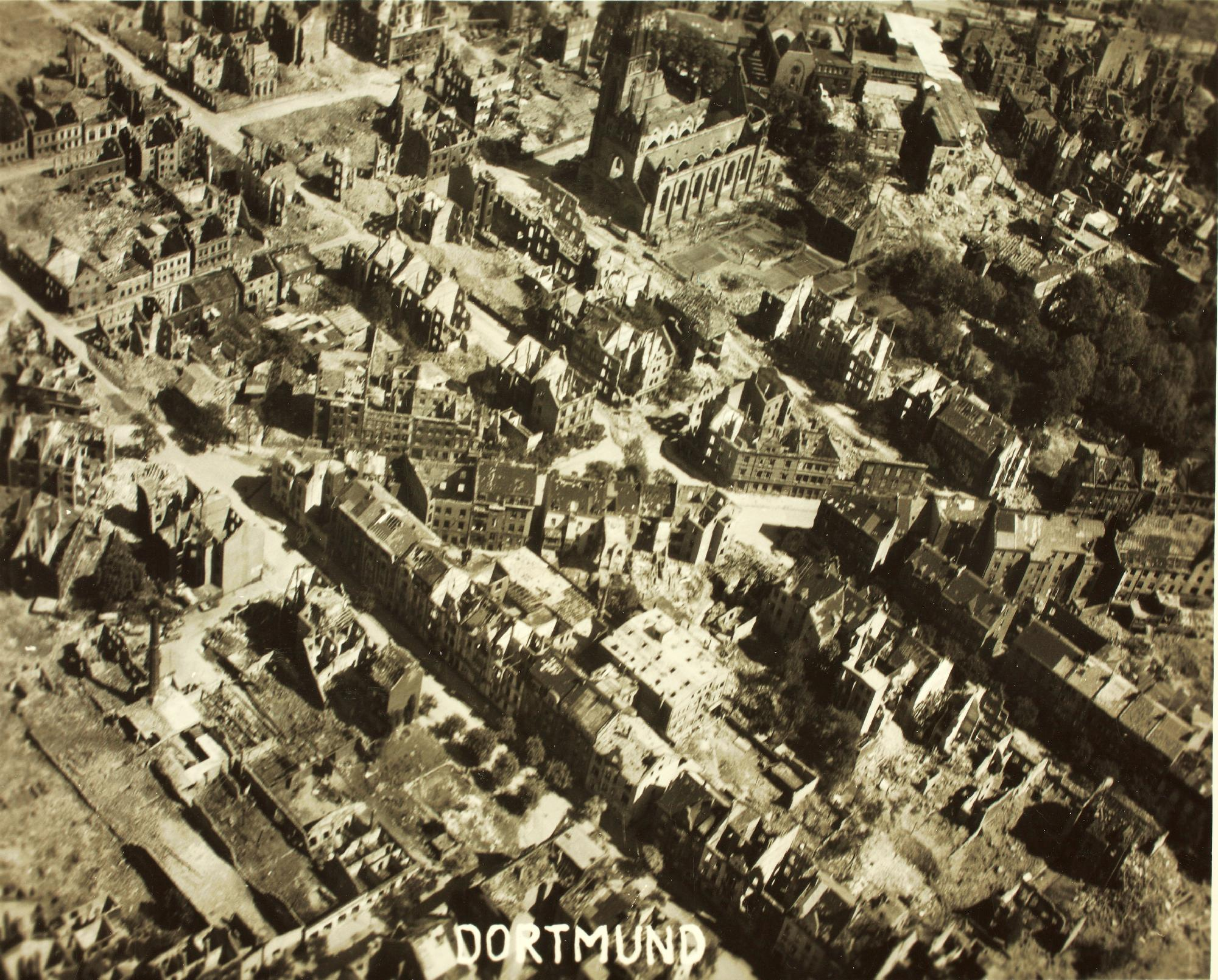
Part of the city centre around Liebfrauen Church in 1945

Under Nazi Germany, the Old Synagogue, which had opened in 1900, was destroyed in 1938. With a capacity of 1,300 seats, it was one of the largest Jewish houses of worship in Germany. Also, the Aplerbeck Hospital in Dortmund transferred mentally and/or physically disabled patients to the Hadamar Killing Facility as part of Aktion T4, where they were murdered. An additional 229 children were murdered in the "Children's Specialist Department", which was transferred from Marburg in 1941.

Dortmund was the location of the Stalag VI-D prisoner-of-war camp for Polish, French, Belgian, British, Serbian, Soviet and Italian POWs with some 300 forced labour units in the city alone, a camp for Sinti and Romani people (see Romani Holocaust), a subcamp of the Buchenwald concentration camp for 800 predominantly Polish women, and a detachment of the 3rd SS construction brigade. In September 1943, the local Gestapo carried out a mass execution of 17 Polish POWs, who escaped the Oflag VI-B POW camp, but were soon captured.

Bombing targets of the Oil Campaign of World War II in Dortmund included Hoesch-Westfalenhütte AG, the "Hoesch-Benzin GmbH" synthetic oil plant, and the Zeche Hansa. The bombings destroyed about 66% of Dortmund homes. The devastating bombing raids of 12 March 1945 with 1,108 aircraft (748 Lancasters, 292 Halifaxes, 68 Mosquitos) destroyed 98% of buildings in the inner city centre, and 4,851 tonnes of bombs were dropped on Dortmund city centre and the south of the city; this was a record for a single target in the whole of World War II.

The Allied ground advance into Germany reached Dortmund in April 1945. The US 95th Infantry Division attacked the city on 12 April 1945 against a stubborn German defense. The division, assisted by close air support, advanced through the ruins in urban combat and completed its capture on 13 April 1945.

=== Postwar period ===
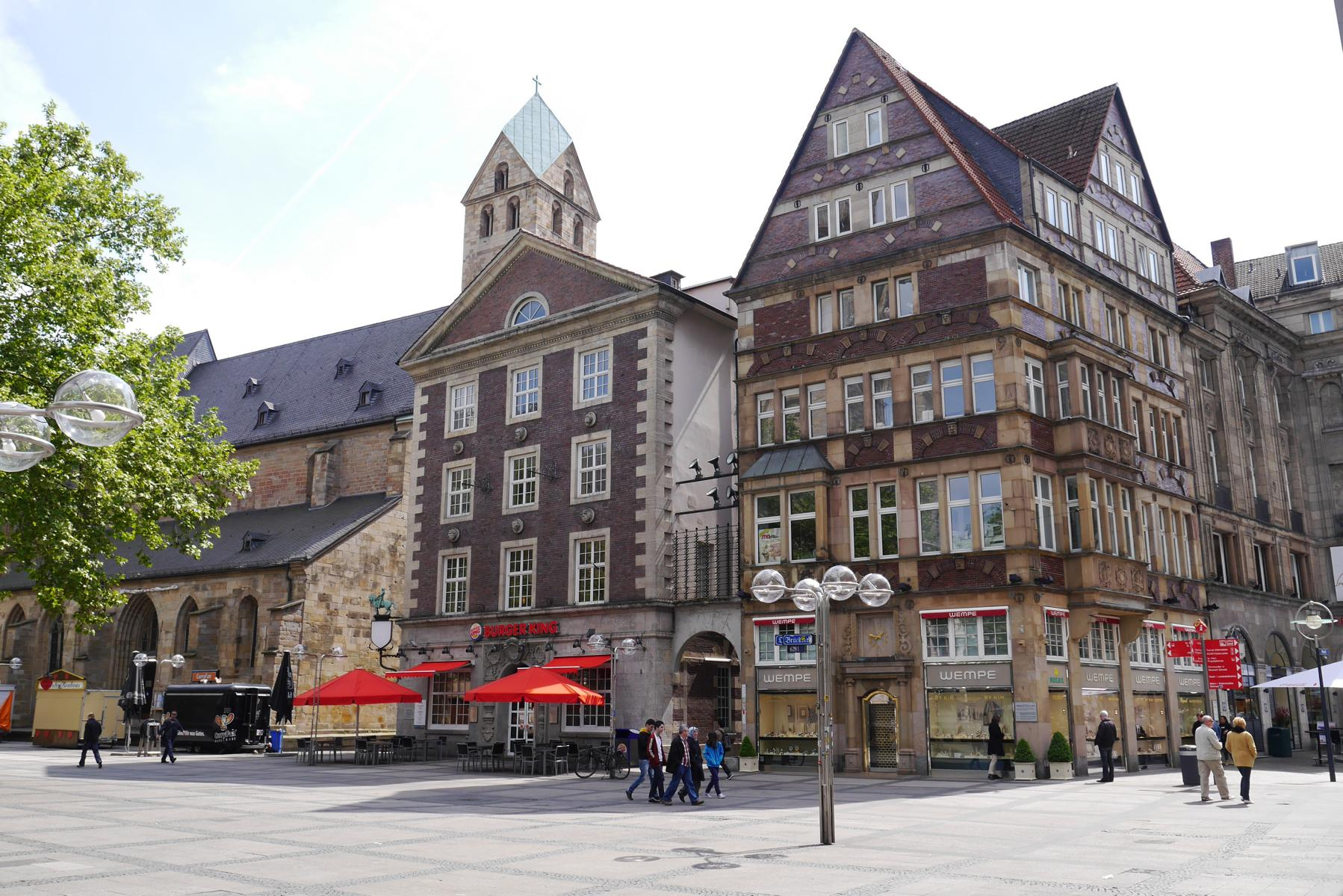
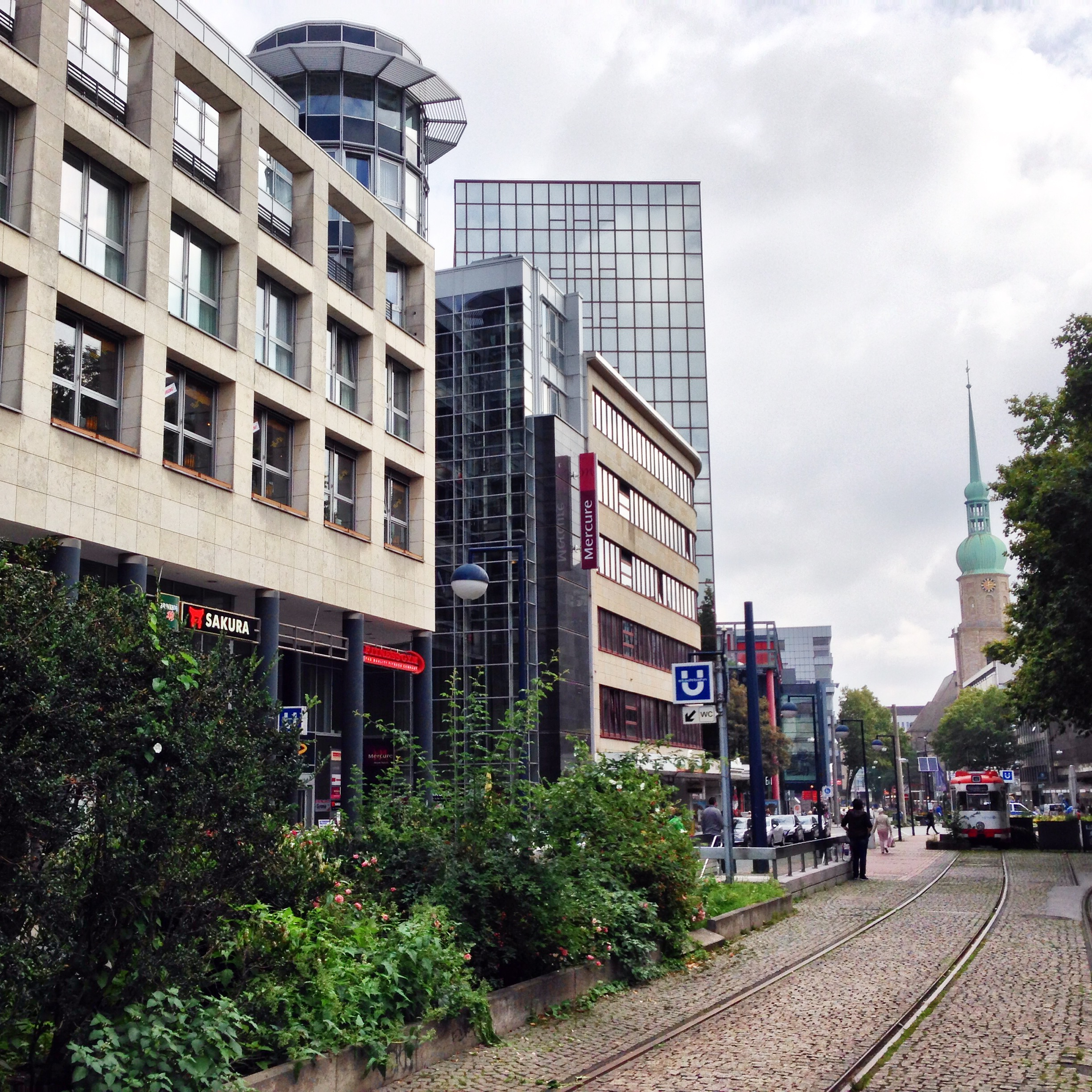
Rebuilt and modern reconstruction around St. Reynolds

Post-war, most of the historic buildings in the city centre were not restored, and large parts of the inner city area were completely rebuilt in the style of the 1950s. A few historic buildings such as the main churches Reinoldikirche and Marienkirche were restored or rebuilt, and extensive parks and gardens were laid out. The simple but successful postwar rebuilding has resulted in a very mixed and unique inner cityscape. Today nearly 30% of the city consists of buildings from before World War II. Dortmund was in the British zone of occupation of Germany, and became part of the new state (Land) of North Rhine-Westphalia in 1946. The LWL-Industriemuseum was founded in 1969. In 1987, the pit Minister Stein closed, marking the end of more than 150 years of coal mining. Dortmund has since adapted, with its century-long steel and coal industries having been replaced by high-technology areas, including biomedical technology, micro systems technology, and services. This has led Dortmund to become a regional centre for hi-tech industry.

In 2005, a new era began for the district of Hörde. After 160 years of industrial history, work started on the Phoenix-See, an artificially created lake. The development of the Phoenix See area was carried out by a subsidiary of the Stadtwerke AG. On 1 October 2010, the largest and most highly anticipated milestone could be celebrated: the launch of the flooding of the Phoenix See. Since 9 May 2011, the fences disappeared and the Phoenix See has been completed. In 2009, Dortmund was classified as a Node city in the Innovation Cities Index published by 2thinknow. In a 2014 ranking, the city was rated the most sustainable city in Germany.

On 3 November 2013, more than 20,000 people were evacuated after a 4,000-pound bomb from World War II was found. German authorities safely defused the bomb. The bomb was found after analysing old aerial photographs while searching for unexploded bombs dropped by Allied aircraft over Germany's industrial Ruhr region.

== Geography ==
=== Location ===
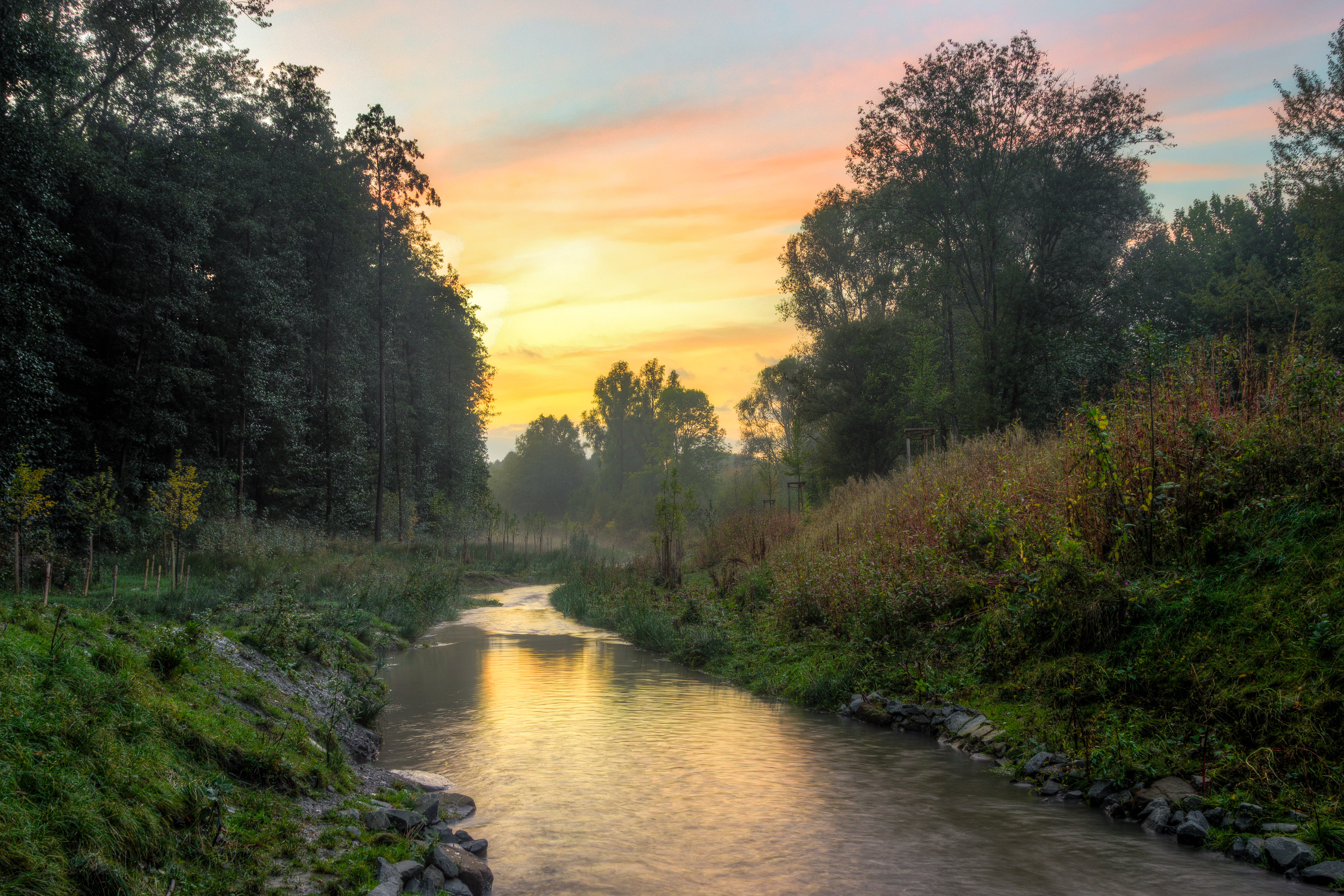
Emscher River in Dortmund

Dortmund is an independent city located in the east of the Ruhr area, one of the largest urban areas in Europe (see also: megalopolis), comprising eleven independent cities and four districts with some 5.3 million inhabitants. The city limits of Dortmund itself are 87 km (54 mi) long and border twelve cities, two independent and ten kreisangehörig (i.e., belonging to a district), with a total population of approximately 2.4 million. The following cities border Dortmund (clockwise starting from west): Bochum, Castrop-Rauxel, Waltrop, Lünen, Kamen, Unna, Holzwickede, Schwerte, Hagen, Herdecke, and Witten. Historically speaking, Dortmund is a part of Westphalia which is situated in the Bundesland North Rhine-Westphalia. Moreover, Dortmund is part of Westphalian Lowland and adjoins with the Ardey Hills, in the south of the city, to the Sauerland.

The Ruhr forms the reservoir on the Hengsteysee next to the borough of Syburg in the south of Dortmund between the cities of Hagen and Herdecke, North Rhine-Westphalia, Germany. The Klusenberg, a hill that is part of the Ardey range, is located just north of the Hengsteysee and the highest point of Dortmund 254.3 m (834 ft). There is also a pumped-storage plant on this reservoir, named Koepchenwerk. The lowest point can be found in the northern borough of Brechten at 48.9 m (160 ft).

The Emscher is a small river and has its wellspring in Holzwickede, east of the city of Dortmund, and flows west through Dortmund. Towns along the Emscher take in Dortmund, Castrop-Rauxel, Herne, Recklinghausen, Gelsenkirchen, Essen, Bottrop, Oberhausen, and Dinslaken, where it flows into the Rhine.

=== Boroughs ===
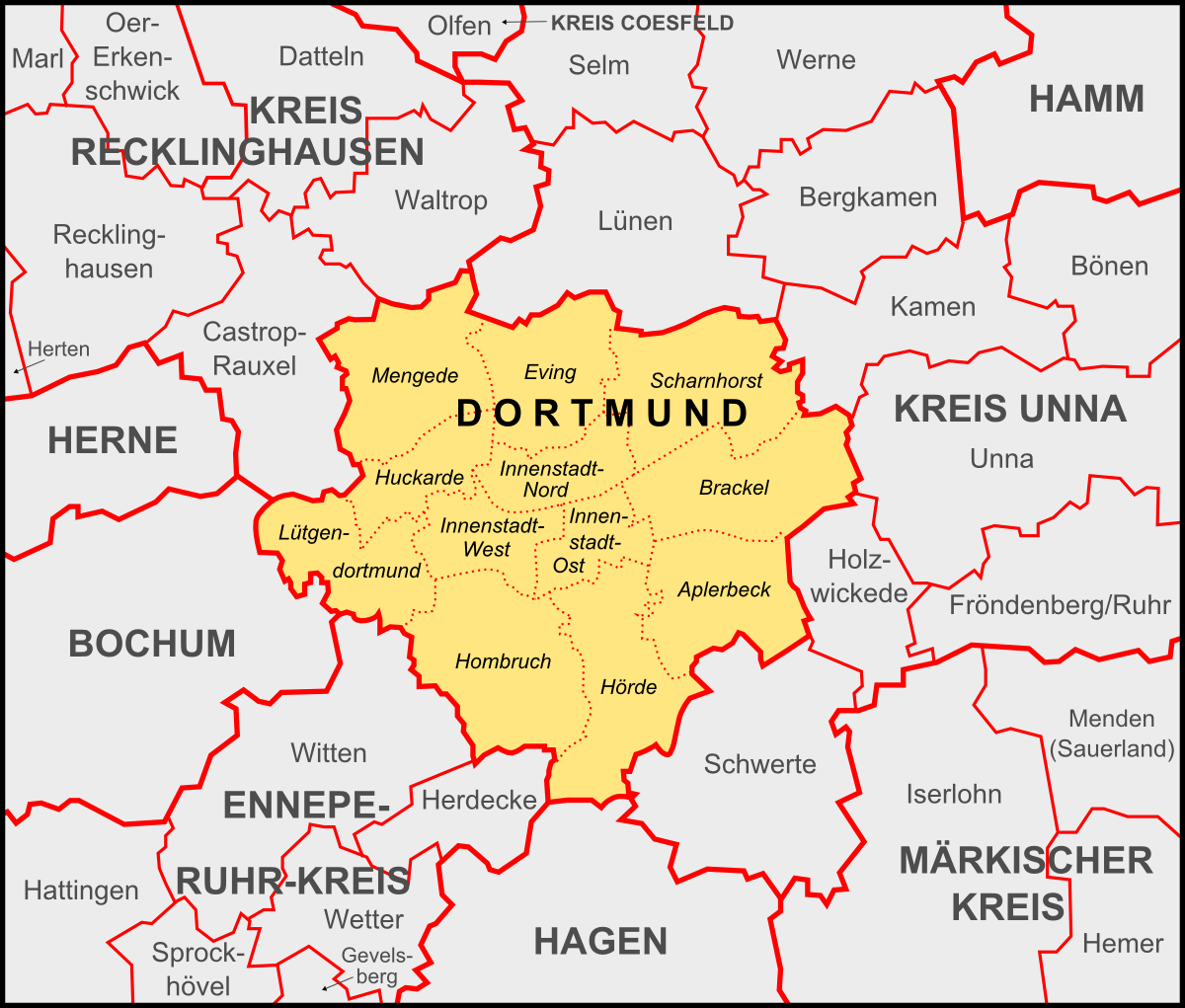
Municipalities and neighbouring communities

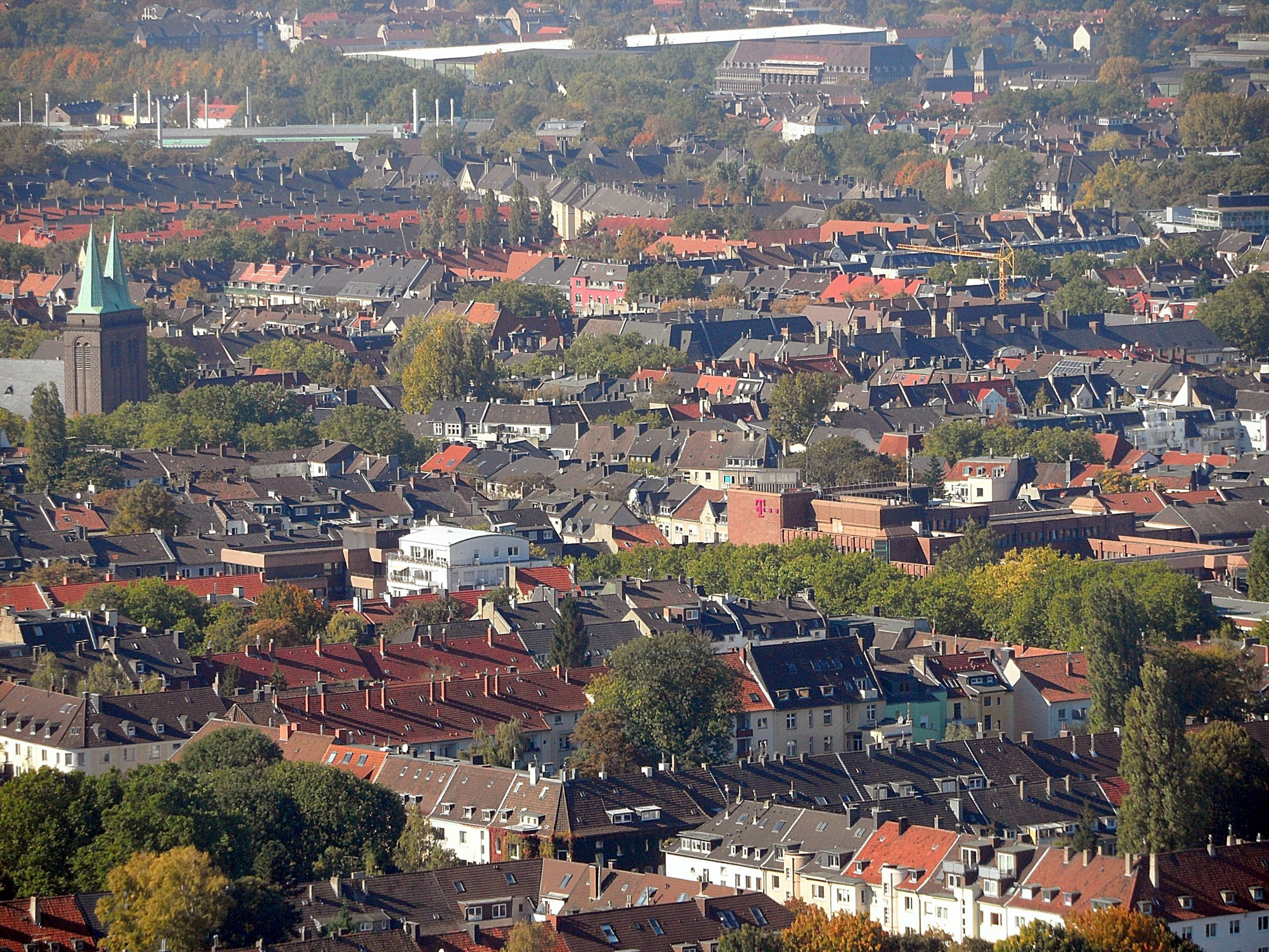
Aerial view of urban Kreuzviertel

Dortmund comprises 62 neighbourhoods which in turn are grouped into twelve boroughs (called "Stadtbezirke"), often named after the most important neighbourhood. Three boroughs cover the area of the inner city (Innenstadt-West (City centre West), Innenstadt-Nord (City centre North), Innenstadt-Ost (City centre East)) and the remaining nine boroughs make up the surrounding area (Eving, Scharnhorst, Brackel, Aplerbeck, Hörde, Hombruch, Lütgendortmund, Huckarde, Mengede). Each "Stadtbezirk" is assigned a Roman numeral and has a local governing body of nineteen members with limited authority. Most of the boroughs were originally independent municipalities but were gradually annexed from 1905 to 1975. This long-lasting process of annexation has led to a strong identification of the population with "their" boroughs or districts and to a rare peculiarity: The borough of Hörde, located in the south of Dortmund and independent until 1928, has its own coat of arms.

The centre can be subdivided into historically evolved city districts, whose borders are not always strictly defined, such as:

- Stadtzentrum (City centre)
- Hafenviertel (Harbour Quarter)
- Nordmarkt (Northern market)
- Borsigplatz
- Kaiserviertel (Emperor Quarter)
- Kronenviertel (Crown Quarter)
- Kreuzviertel (Cross Quarter)
- Klinikviertel (Clinical Quarter)
- Saarlandstraßenviertel (Saarland street Quarter)
- Unionviertel (Union Quarter)
- Gartenstadt (Garden Town)

=== Climate ===
Dortmund is situated in the temperate climate zone with oceanic climate (Köppen: Cfb). Winters are cool; summers are warm. The average annual temperature lies at approximately 9 to 10 °C (48 to 50 °F), the total average annual amount of precipitation lies at approximately 800 mm (31 in). Precipitation evenly falls throughout the year; steady rain (with some snow), prevails in the wintertime, isolated showers dominate the summer season. Dortmund features characteristics of densely populated areas as for example the occurrence of urban heat islands is typical.

Climate data for Dortmund
Month	Jan	Feb	Mar	Apr	May	Jun	Jul	Aug	Sep	Oct	Nov	Dec	Year
Record high °C (°F)	14.6 (58.3)	18.5 (65.3)	23.5 (74.3)	30.2 (86.4)	34.4 (93.9)	34.9 (94.8)	36.8 (98.2)	37.6 (99.7)	33.4 (92.1)	28.6 (83.5)	20.1 (68.2)	16.1 (61.0)	37.6 (99.7)
Mean daily maximum °C (°F)	4 (39)	5 (41)	9 (48)	13 (55)	18 (64)	21 (70)	22 (72)	22 (72)	19 (66)	15 (59)	9 (48)	5 (41)	14 (56)
Mean daily minimum °C (°F)	−1 (30)	−1 (30)	2 (36)	4 (39)	8 (46)	11 (52)	13 (55)	13 (55)	10 (50)	7 (45)	3 (37)	1 (34)	6 (42)
Average precipitation mm (inches)	77.1 (3.04)	68.1 (2.68)	61.4 (2.42)	48.4 (1.91)	61.8 (2.43)	72.7 (2.86)	90.6 (3.57)	85.2 (3.35)	72.8 (2.87)	72.1 (2.84)	73.3 (2.89)	81.5 (3.21)	865 (34.07)
Average rainy days	19	17	14	16	14	14	17	16	15	17	19	19	197
Average relative humidity (%)	86.5	82.3	76.6	70.3	71.5	71.8	73.0	75.3	79.7	83.8	87.2	87.8	78.8
Mean monthly sunshine hours	50.2	71.7	121.2	172.6	199.4	199.2	206.5	194.3	143.7	103.8	53.9	39.8	1,556.3
Source 1: DWD(precipitation and sun)
Source 2: Wetter Kontor, Weather.Directory

== Demographics ==
Dortmund's population grew rapidly in the time of the 19th century industrialisation, when coal mining and steel processing in the city began. 1904 marks the year when Dortmund saw a population of more than 100,000 for the first time in its history. During the 19th century the area around Dortmund, called Ruhr, attracted up to 500,000 ethnic Poles, Masurians, and Silesians from East Prussia and Silesia, in a migration known as Ostflucht (flight from the east). Most of the new inhabitants came from Eastern Europe, but immigrants also came from France, Ireland, and the United Kingdom. Almost all their descendants today speak German as a mother tongue, and for various reasons, they do not identify with their Polish roots and traditions; often only their Polish family names remaining as a sign of their past. Not taking the fluctuation of war years into account, the population figures rose constantly to 657,804 in 1965. As a result of the city's post-industrial decline, the population fell to just under 580,000 in 2011.

Contrary to earlier projections, population figures have been on the rise in recent years due to net migration gains. Dortmund has seen a moderate influx of younger people (18 to 25 years of age) mainly because of its universities. Data of the EU-wide 2011 census revealed discrepancies between the census data and the official population statistics, which resulted in a statistical "loss" of 9,000 inhabitants in Dortmund. In 2016, it was announced that the population was back above 600,000. As of 2024, with a population of 603,462, Dortmund is the ninth largest city in Germany (after Berlin, Hamburg, Munich, Cologne, Frankfurt, Düsseldorf, Stuttgart, and Leipzig) and the largest city in the Ruhr agglomeration.

Historical population

Year	Pop.	±% p.a.
1300	10,000	—
1480	8,000	−0.12%
1600	4,000	−0.58%
1700	3,000	−0.29%
1812	4,828	+0.43%
1871	44,420	+3.83%
1900	142,733	+4.11%
1910	214,226	+4.14%
1925	321,743	+2.75%
1939	542,261	+3.80%
1946	436,491	−3.05%
1950	507,349	+3.83%
1956	607,885	+3.06%
1961	641,480	+1.08%

Year	Pop.	±% p.a.
1965	658,943	+0.67%
1970	648,188	−0.33%
1975	630,610	−0.55%
1980	608,313	−0.72%
1985	572,116	−1.22%
1990	599,055	+0.92%
1995	598,840	−0.01%
2000	588,994	−0.33%
2005	588,168	−0.03%
2010	580,444	−0.26%
2015	586,181	+0.20%
2020	587,696	+0.05%
2025	600,880	+0.44%

Population size may be affected by changes in administrative divisions.
Source: Landesdatabank Nordrhein-Westfalen (1965-2025)

Largest groups of foreign residents
Nationality	Population (31 December 2022)
Turkey	22,154
Poland	11,388
Syria	7,791
Ukraine	7,368
Romania	4,561
Greece	4,132
Spain	3,623
Italy	3,569
Morocco	3,421
Bulgaria	3,416
Iraq	2,229
Croatia	2,103
North Macedonia	2,034
Russia	1,902
Portugal	1,851
Bosnia and Herzegovina	1,780
Serbia	1,532
China	1,304
Hungary	1,284
Kosovo	1,225

As of 2012, Dortmund had a population of 571,403, of whom about 177,000 (roughly 30%) were of non-German origin. The table shows the number of first and second generation immigrants in Dortmund by nationality as of 31 December 2014. As with much of the Ruhr area, Dortmund has sizable Turkish and South European communities (particularly Spanish), and had one of Germany's most visible Slavic populations.

=== Religion ===
As of 2022, the largest Christian denominations were Protestantism (23.7%) and Catholicism (22.6% of the population). Furthermore, in Dortmund the Greek Orthodox Church, the Serbian Orthodox Church, and the Macedonian Orthodox Church are represented. The Church of the Holy Apostles (gre. I.N. Αγίων Αποστόλων Ντόρτμουντ – I.N. Agíon Apostólon Dortmund) was the first Greek church in Germany to be founded due to the influx of "guest workers". Also Dortmund is home of the New Apostolic Church in North Rhine-Westphalia, with more than 84,944 community members.

The Jewish community has a history dating back to Medieval times and has always ranked among the largest in Westphalia. Dortmund is home to the National Association of Jewish Communities of Westfalen-Lippe. The synagogues operate there in City center, Hörde, and Dorstfeld. Due to the growing immigration of people from Muslim countries beginning in the 1960s, Dortmund has a large Muslim community with more than 30 mosques.

In June 2019 Dortmund hosted the 37th Evangelischer Kirchentag – German Evangelical Church Assembly.

== Government and politics ==
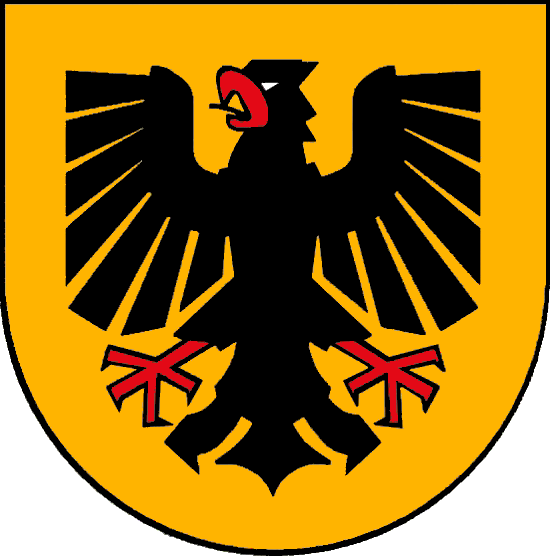
Dortmund coat of arms

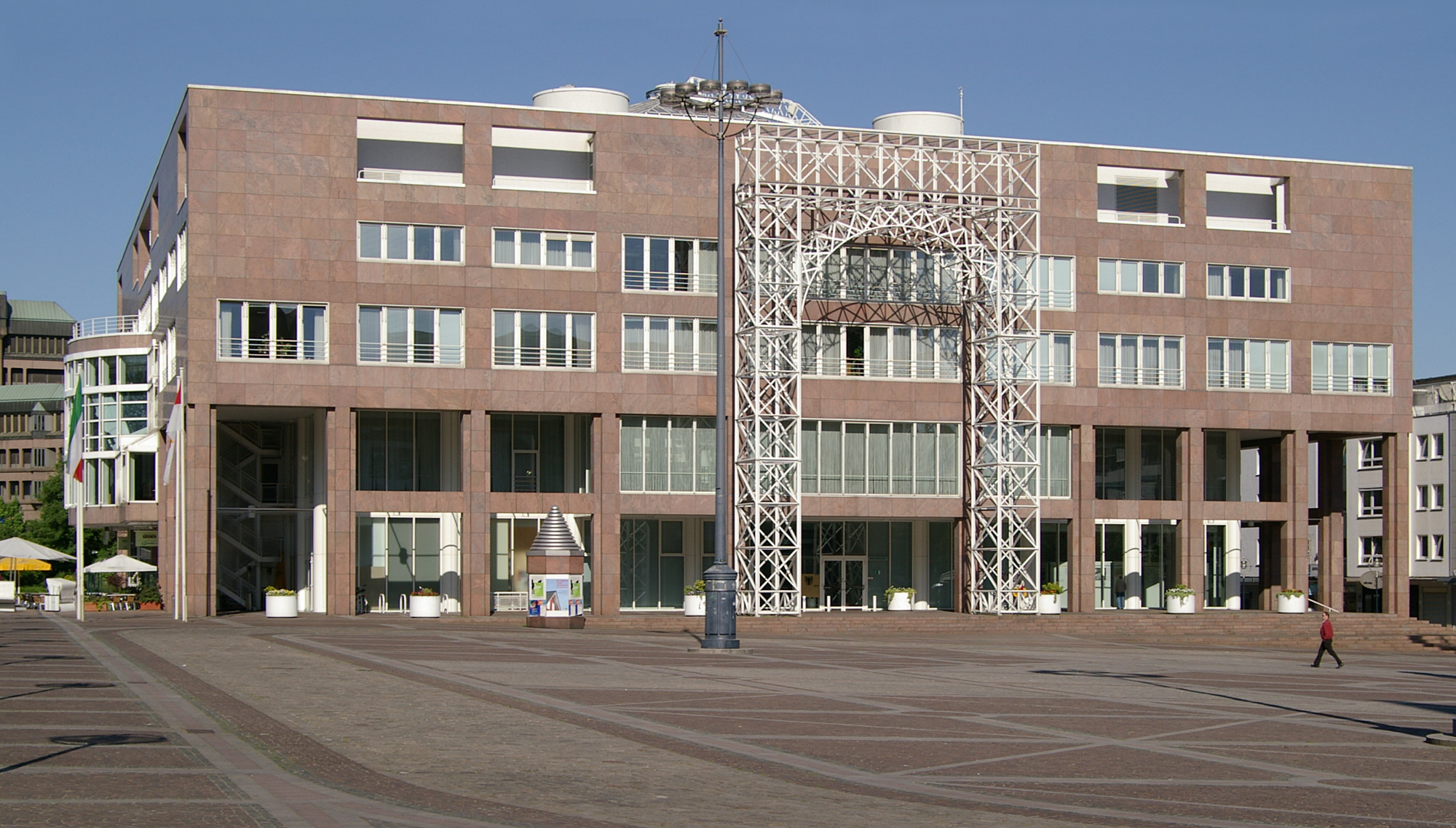
Townhall Dortmund

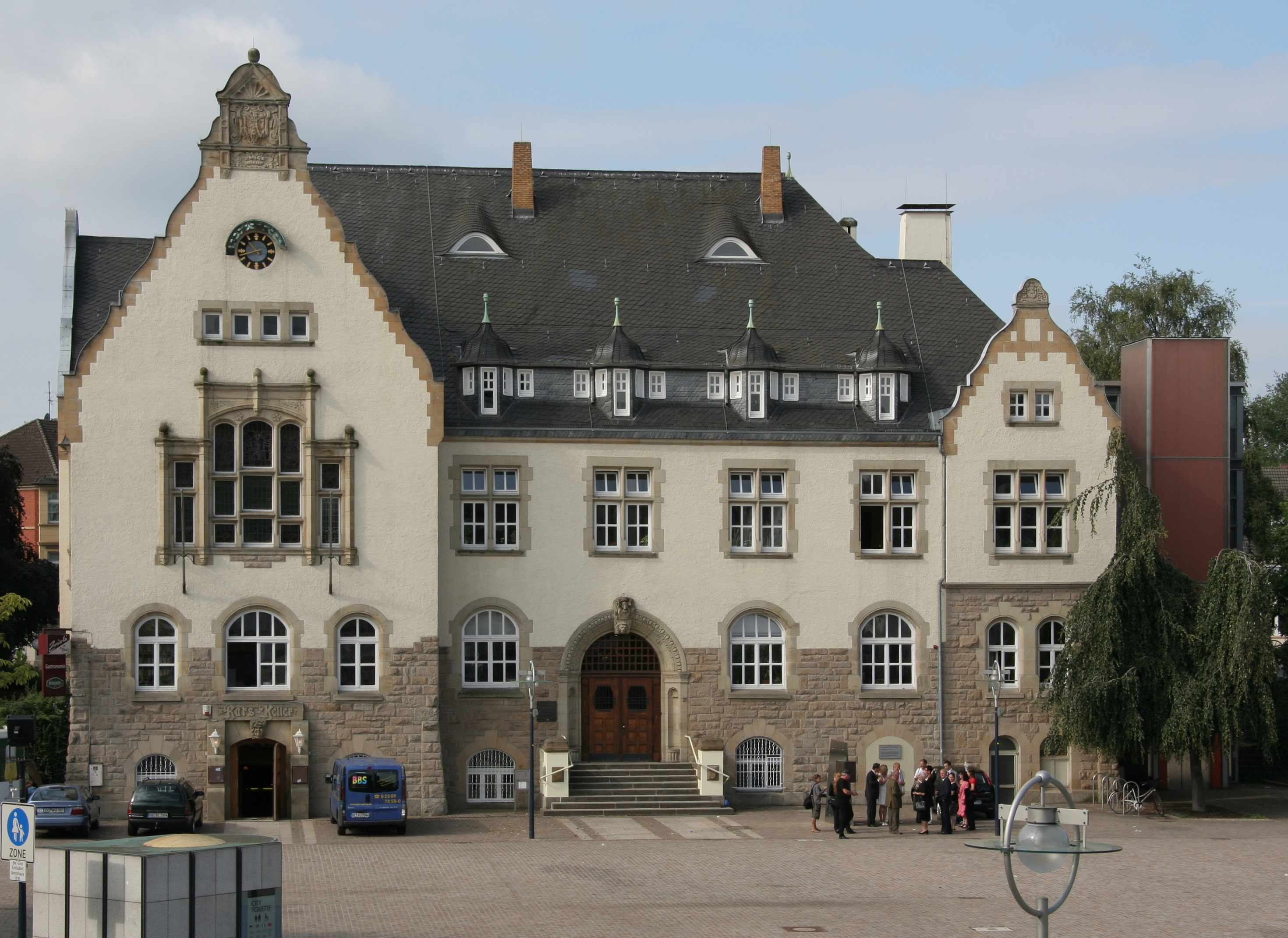
Townhall Aplerbeck, one of twelve district councils

Dortmund is one of nineteen independent district-free cities (kreisfreie Städte) in North Rhine-Westphalia, which means that it does not form part of another general-purpose local government entity, in this case it is not part of a Landkreis. Since 1975, Dortmund is divided into twelve administrative districts. Each district (Bezirk) has its own elected district council (Bezirksvertretung) and its own district mayor (Bezirksbürgermeister). The district councils are advisory only.

Dortmund is often called the Herzkammer der SPD (roughly translated as "heartland of the Social democrats"), after the politically dominant party in the city. During the Nazi era (1933–1945), mayors were installed by the Nazi Party. After World War II, the military government of the British occupation zone installed a new mayor and a municipal constitution modeled on that of British cities. The first major elected by the population of Dortmund was Fritz Henßler. Since the end of the war, the SPD has held a plurality in the city council, except for the period from 1999 to 2004.

=== Mayor ===
The current mayor of Dortmund is Alexander Omar Kalouti of the CDU, who was elected in 2025.

The most recent mayoral election was held on 14 September 2025, with a runoff held on 28 September, and the results were as follows:

Candidate	Party	First round		Second round	
Candidate	Party	Votes	%	Votes	%
Alexander Omar Kalouti	Christian Democratic Union	39,687	17.0	83,204	52.9
Thomas Westphal	Social Democratic Party	63,862	27.4	74,034	47.1
Martin Cremer	Independent	34,117	14.6		
Heinrich Theodor Garbe	Alternative for Germany	33,971	14.6		
Katrin Lögering	Alliance 90/The Greens	32,670	14.0		
Fatma Karacakurtoglu	The Left	13,804	5.9		
Özkan Arikan	Alliance for Diversity and Tolerance	2,950	1.3		
Michael Badura	Human Environment Animal Protection Party	2,861	1.2		
Olaf Schlösser	Die PARTEI	2,857	1.2		
Michael Kauch	Free Democratic Party	2,808	1.2		
Christian Gebel	Volt Germany	1,838	0.8		
Marc-Ruediger Ossau	Free Voters Dortmund	1,468	0.6		
Valid votes		232,893	99.3	157,238	98.6
Invalid votes		1,617	0.7	2,197	1.4
Total		234,510	100.0	159,435	100.0
Electorate/voter turnout		441,696	53.1	441,471	36.1
Source: State Returning Officer

=== City council ===
Results of the 2025 city council election.

The Dortmund city council (Dortmunder Stadtrat) governs the city alongside the mayor. The most recent city council election was held on 14 September 2025, and the results were as follows:

Party	Votes	%	+/-	Seats	+/-
Social Democratic Party (SPD)	57,770	24.9	▼5.1	26	▼1
Christian Democratic Union (CDU)	51,329	22.1	▼0.4	23	▲3
Alternative for Germany (AfD)	38,485	16.6	▲11.1	18	▲13
Alliance 90/The Greens (Grüne)	38,255	16.5	▼8.3	17	▼5
The Left (Die Linke)	18,497	8.0	▲2.4	8	▲3
Free Democratic Party (FDP)	4,867	2.1	▼1.4	2	▼1
Human Environment Animal Protection (Tierschutz)	4,696	2.0	▲1.1	2	▲1
Sahra Wagenknecht Alliance (BSW)	4,660	2.0	New	2	New
Die PARTEI (PARTEI)	4,063	1.8	▼1.0	2	▼1
Alliance for Diversity and Tolerance (BVT)	3,338	1.4	New	2	New
Volt Germany (Volt)	3,227	1.4	New	1	New
Citizens' List Free Voters (Bürgerliste-FW)	2,607	1.1	▲0.5	1	±0
Grassroots Democratic Party of Germany (dieBasis)	181	0.1	New	0	New
Democratic Independent Voters' association (DUW)	129	0.1	New	0	New
Valid votes	232,146	99.1			
Invalid votes	2,137	0.9			
Total	234,283	100.0		104	▲14
Electorate/voter turnout	441,696	53.0	▲5.9		
Source: State Returning Officer

=== Twin towns – sister cities ===
Dortmund is twinned with:

- Leeds, United Kingdom (1949)
- Amiens, France (1960)
- Rostov-on-Don, Russia (1973)
- Buffalo, United States (1977)
- Netanya, Israel (1980)
- Novi Sad, Serbia (1982)
- Zwickau, Germany (1989)
- Xi'an, China (1991)
- Trabzon, Turkey (2014)
- Kumasi, Ghana (2024)
- Zhytomyr, Ukraine (2025)

== Cityscape ==
=== City centre ===
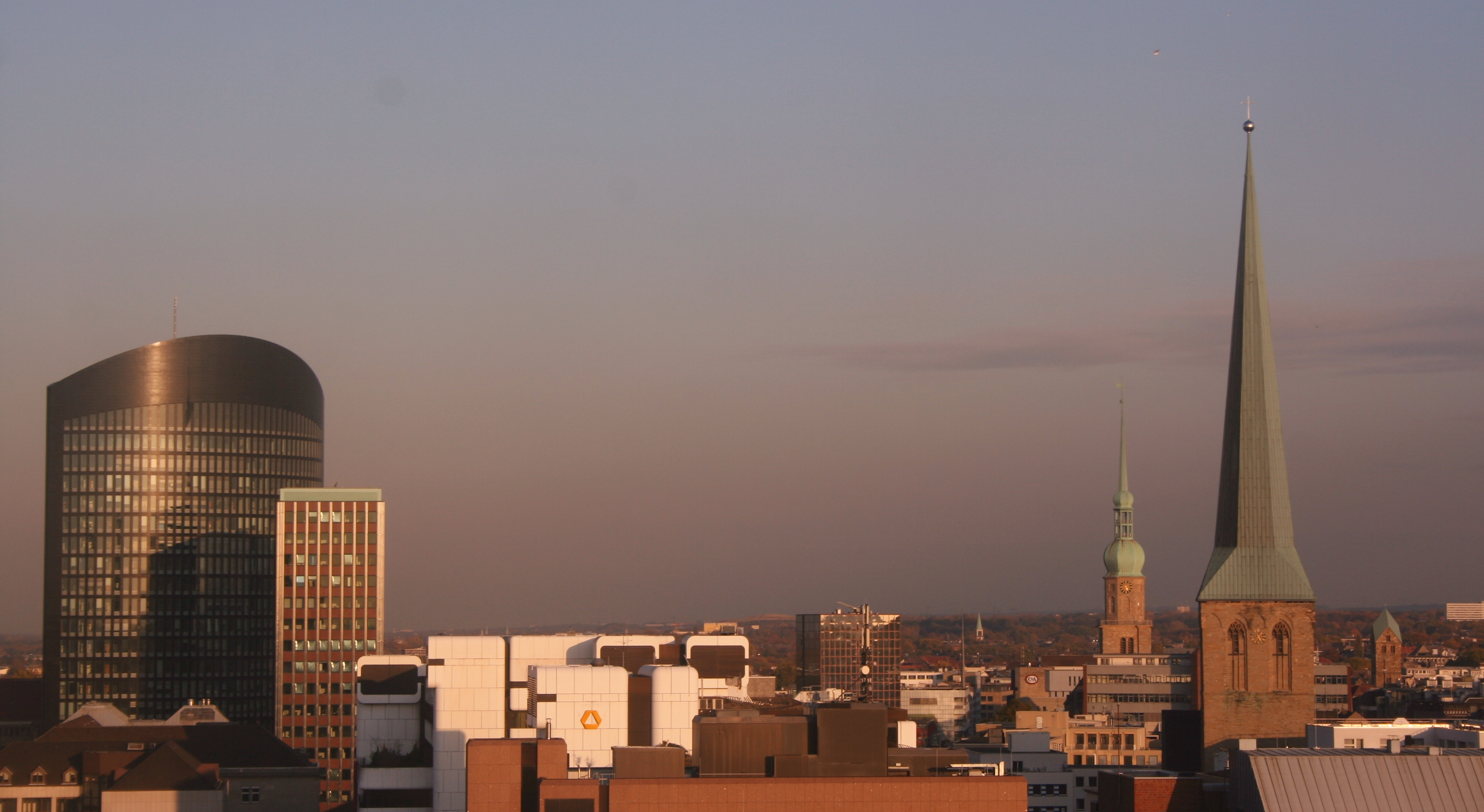
Dortmund with RWE-Tower and churches of Reinoldi, Petri and Marien on the right

Dortmund's city centre offers a picture full of contrasts. Historic buildings like Altes Stadthaus or the Krügerpassage rub shoulders with post-war architecture like Gesundheitshaus and concrete constructions with Romanesque churches like the Reinoldikirche and the Marienkirche. The near-complete destruction of Dortmund's city centre during World War II (98%) has resulted in a varied architectural landscape. The reconstruction of the city centre followed the style of the 1950s, while respecting the old layout and naming of the streets. The downtown of Dortmund still retains the outline of the medieval city. A ring road marks the former city wall, and the Westen-/Ostenhellweg, part of a medieval salt trading route, is still the major (pedestrian) street bisecting the city centre.

Thus, the inner city today is characterized by simple and modest post-war buildings, with a few interspersed pre-war buildings which were reconstructed due to their historical importance. Some buildings of the "Wiederaufbauzeit" (era of reconstruction), for example the opera house are nowadays regarded as classics of modern architecture.

=== Urban districts ===
Unlike the Dortmund city centre, much of the inner districts around the old medieval centre escaped damage in the second world war and post war redevelopment.

==== Kreuzviertel ====
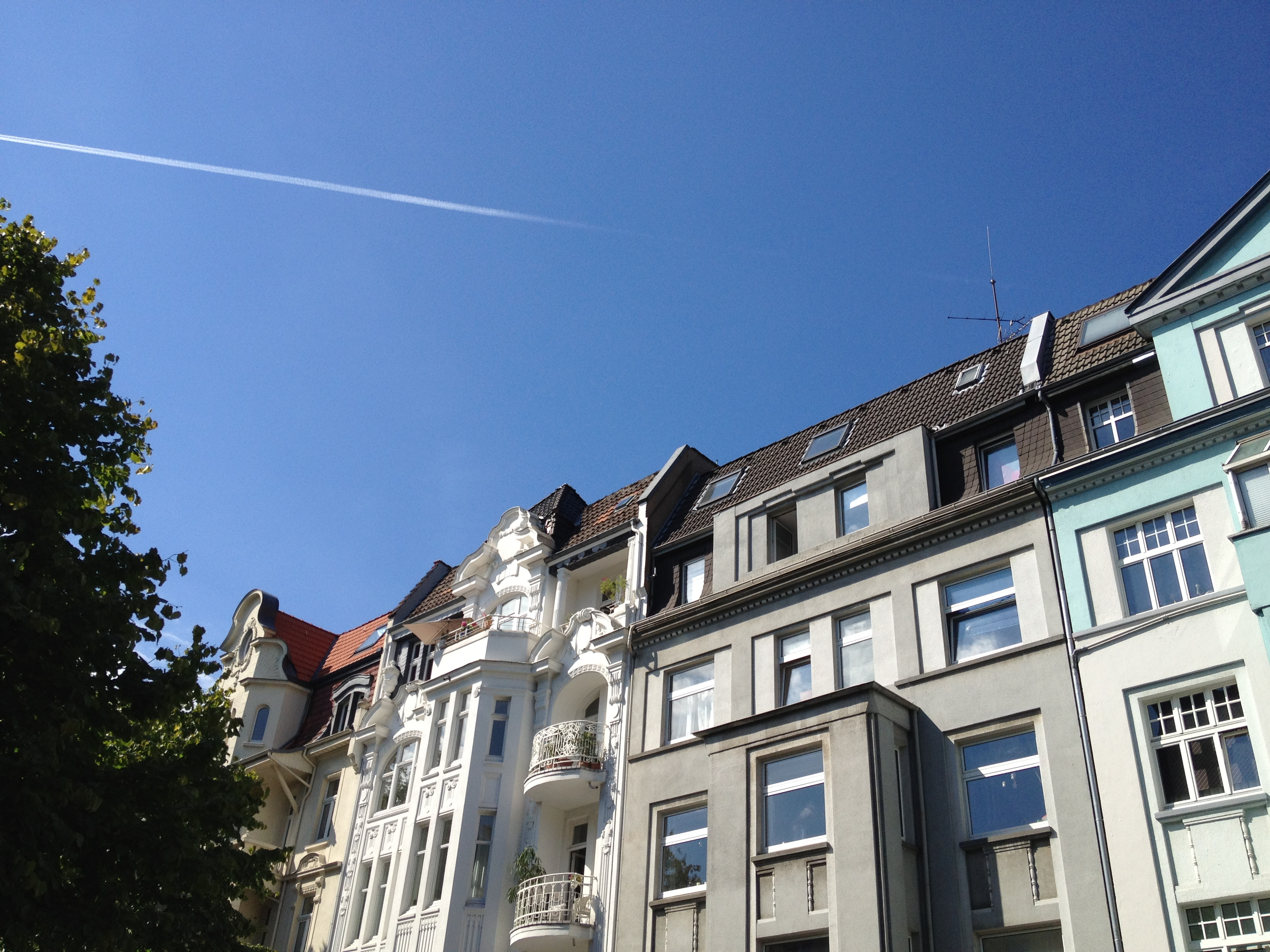
Typical Wilhelminian style houses

The Kreuzviertel is characterised by old buildings, the majority of which come from the turn of the 20th century (1884 to 1908). Over 80% of all housing in this area was constructed before 1948, with the oldest building the Dortmund University of Applied Sciences and Arts still standing being from 1896. In the Second World War, relatively few buildings were destroyed in comparison to other areas of the city. Today, Kreuzviertel forms a nearly homogeneous historic building area. Over 100 buildings remain protected as historic monuments, like the Kreuzkirche at Kreuzstraße and the first concrete church in Germany St.-Nicolai. Nowadays the Kreuzviertel is a trendy district with pubs, restaurants, cafés, galleries, and little shops. Moreover, local efforts to beautify and invigorate the neighbourhood have reinforced a budding sense of community and artistic expression. The West park is the green lung of the Kreuzviertel and in the months between May and October a centre of the student urban life. The district has the highest real estate prices in Dortmund.

Even today many artists choose Kreuzviertel as their residence: Sascha Schmitz, Christina Hammer, and players of Borussia Dortmund.

==== Nordstadt ====
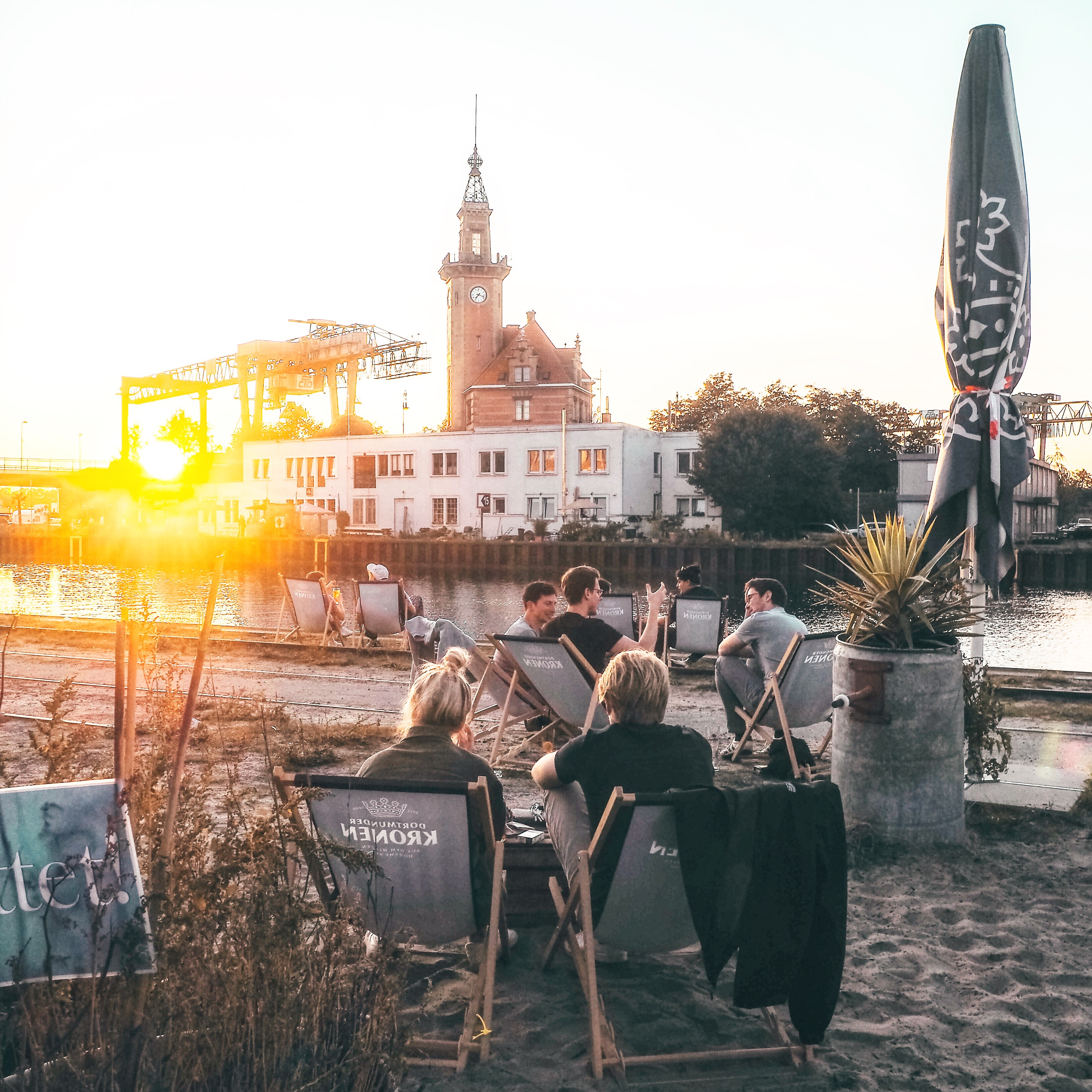
Dockland – young restaurant and bars scene

The northern downtown part of Dortmund called Nordstadt, situated in a territory of 14.42 km^{2} (5.57 sq mi) is shaped by a colorful variety of cultures. As the largest homogeneous old building area in Ruhr the Nordstadt is a melting pot of different people of different countries and habits just a few steps from the city center. The Nordstadt is an industrial urban area that was mainly developed in the 19th century to serve the Westfalenhütte steelworks, port and rail freight depot. All of the residents live in a densely populated 300 hectare area (the most densely populated residential area in the state of North Rhine-Westphalia with steelworks, port and railway lines acting as physical barriers cutting off the area from the city centre and other residential districts).

The area has been badly affected by the deindustrialisation of these heavy industries, with the target area developing a role as the home for growing numbers of immigrants and socially disadvantaged groups partly because of the availability of cheaper (although poor quality) accommodation. Nevertheless, two parks – Fredenbaumpark and Hoeschpark – are situated there. There is also much equipment for children to spend their free time. For example, the 35 meters high Big Tipi, which was brought in from the Expo 2000 in Hanover. All of that should attract families to settle in, but low prices of apartments and a variety of renting offers speak for the contrary. This developed into the youngest population of Dortmund is living and created a district with art house cinemas to ethnic stores, from exotic restaurants to student pubs.

The Borsigplatz is probably one of the best known squares in Germany. Ballspielverein Borussia Dortmund was founded nearby, north-east of the main railway station. The streets radiating outward to form a star shape, the sycamore in the middle of the square and the tramline running diagonally across the square give Borsigplatz its very own flair.

==== Kaiserviertel ====
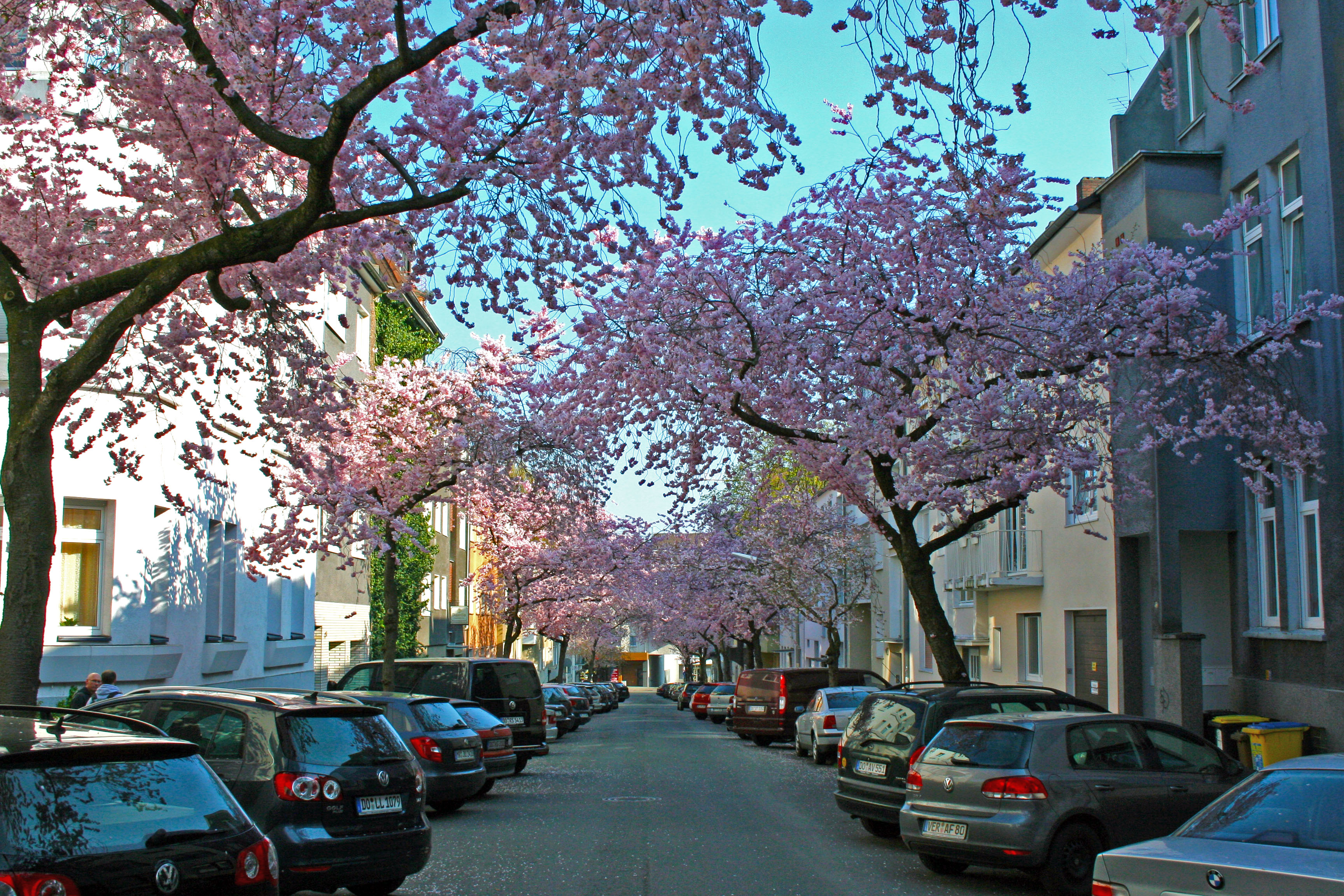
Cherry Blossom Avenue

The Kaiserstraßen District is located east of the former ramparts of Dortmund and follows the course of the Westenhellweg. In this district numerous magnificent buildings from the 1900s and new buildings from the 1950s are located next to the heritage-protected State Mining Office Dortmund, several Courts, Consulate and the East Cemetery. The district is characterize by the employee of the Amtsgericht, Landgericht (the first and second instances of ordinary jurisdiction) and the Prison.

Today the historical Kaiserbrunnen and the entrance sign for Kaiserstraße are important starting points for a tour to the popular shopping district. The Moltkestreet also known as the Cherry Blossom Avenue, became famous after photographers started posting pictures of blooming trees. Every spring, usually in April, the street in the Kaiserstraßen district is booming with pink blossoms and attracts tourists.

==== Unionviertel ====
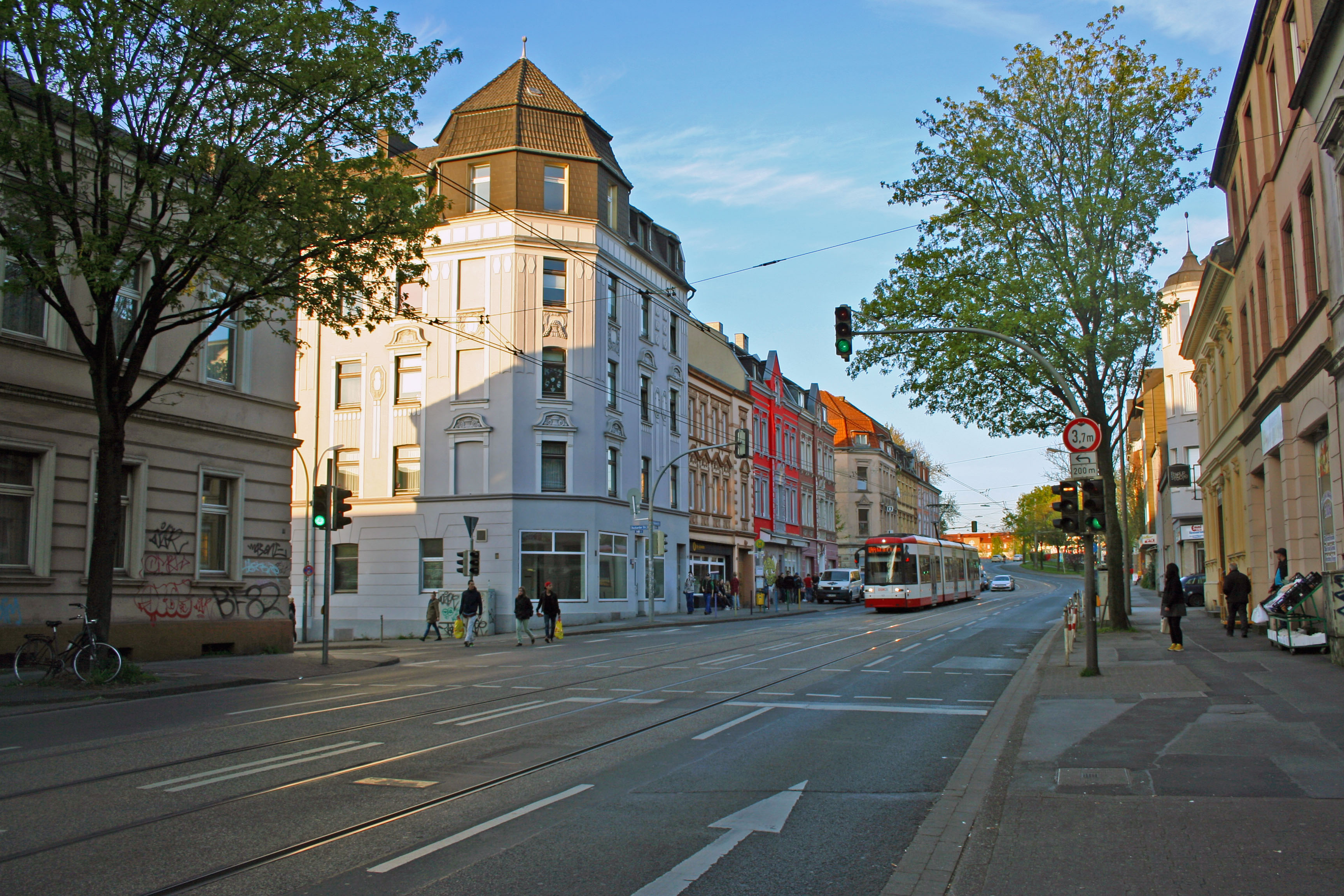
Rheinische Straße

The Union District is located west of the former ramparts of Dortmund and follows the course of the Westenhellweg. For a long time, the neighbourhood at the Dortmunder U and along the Rheinische Straße was marked by vacancy and social distortion due to structural change. Today it is developing an inspiring young artist scene, with more and more students thanks to cheaper apartments near the university and a vibrant gastronomy. This development benefits strongly from the new, widely visible beacon, the art and creative centre Dortmunder U, opened in 2010. For some time, it was mainly the Union Gewerbehof activists and other single stakeholders who initiated change.

==== Hörde on Lake Phoenix ====
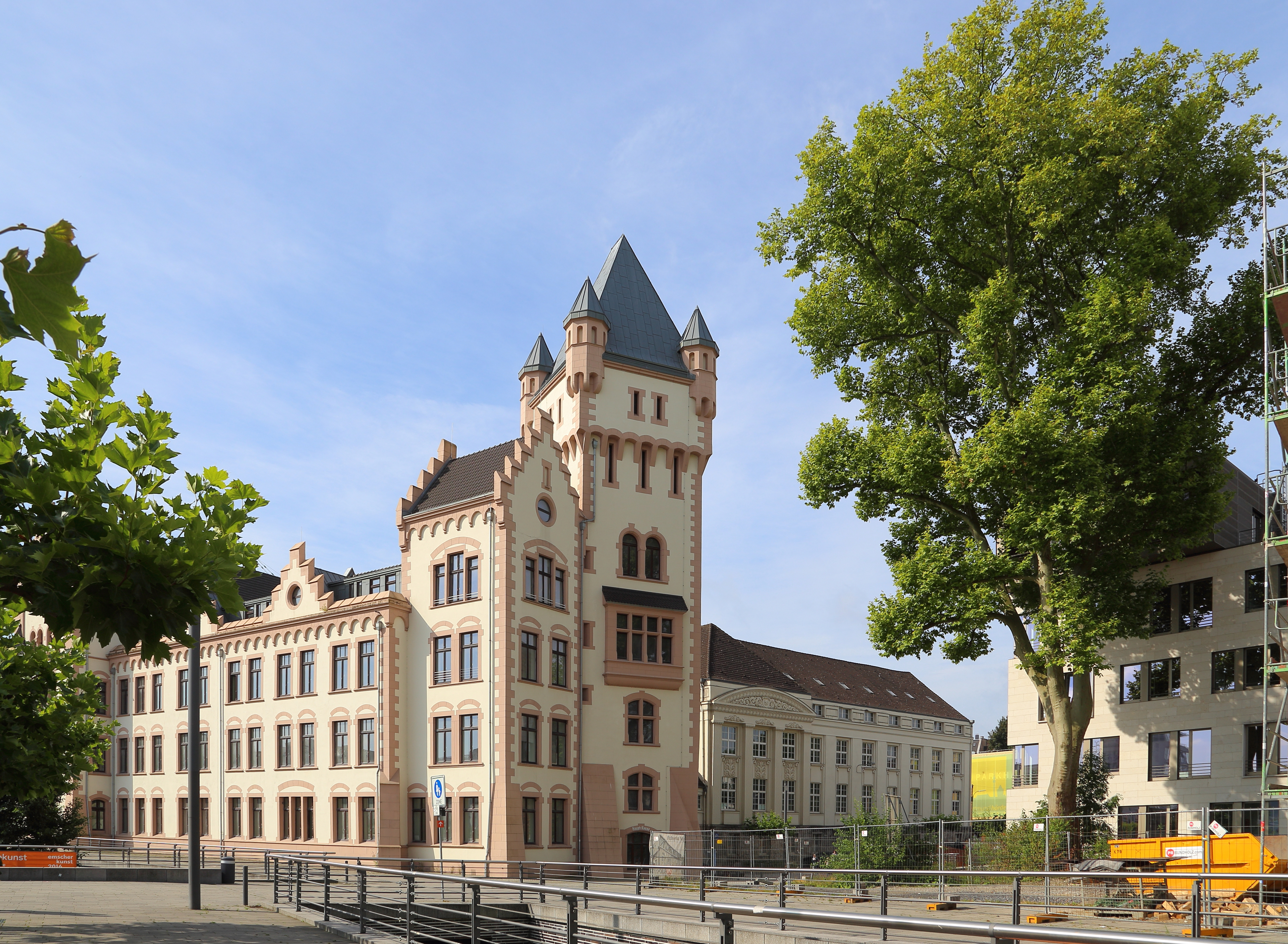
Hörde castle

Hörde is borough in the south of the city of Dortmund. Originally Hörde was a separate town (until 1929) and was founded by the Counts of Mark in opposition to their principal enemy, the town of Dortmund. In 1388, the "Großen Dortmunder Fehde" (great feud of Dortmund) took place, where the city of Dortmund battled against the alliance of surrounding towns. The struggle ended in 1390, with defeat for Hörde and its allies of Herdecke, Witten, Bochum, Castrop, Lünen, Unna, and Schwerte. Today Hörde is a part of Dortmund with restored old buildings combined with modern architecture. The Hörder Burg (Hörde castle) was built in the 12th century and is located in the east of the town, close to the Emscher and Lake Phoenix.

Lake Phoenix was one of the largest urban redevelopment projects in Europe. On the area of the former blast furnace and steel plant site of ThyssenKrupp newly formed and developed a new urban resident and recreational area 3 kilometers (2 miles) from the city centre of Dortmund. The development of the Phoenix See area cost €;170 million. The lake is 1.2 km long directed to east–west and 320 meters wide in north–south direction. The water surface area of 24 acres is larger than the Hamburg Alster. Lake Phoenix is a shallow water lake with a depth of 3 to 4 meters and a capacity of around 600,000 cubic meters. Attractive high priced residential areas were thus created on the southern and northern sides of the Lake. On the western lakeside, the existing district centre of Hörde is enlarged by a city port and a mixed functional urban area.

Companies with agencies and offices on the lakefront include:

- Zalando
- HSBC Trinkaus
- German Handball Association
- Handball-Bundesliga (HBL)
- Sparkassenakademie Nordrhein-Westfalen, a training organization of the Sparkassen
- Mircosonic

The finished sole is primarily fed by groundwater and unpolluted rainwater from the new building sites. The River Emscher flows through an embanked riverbed without direct link to the Lake. Together with the renatured Emscher, the Lake forms a water landscape of 33 hectares, which, as a linking area, is an important element of the Emscher landscape park. The renaturation of the Emscher River is managed by the public water board Emschergenossenschaft. The financial frame is 4.5 billion Euro and the aim is to finish the main work by 2020.

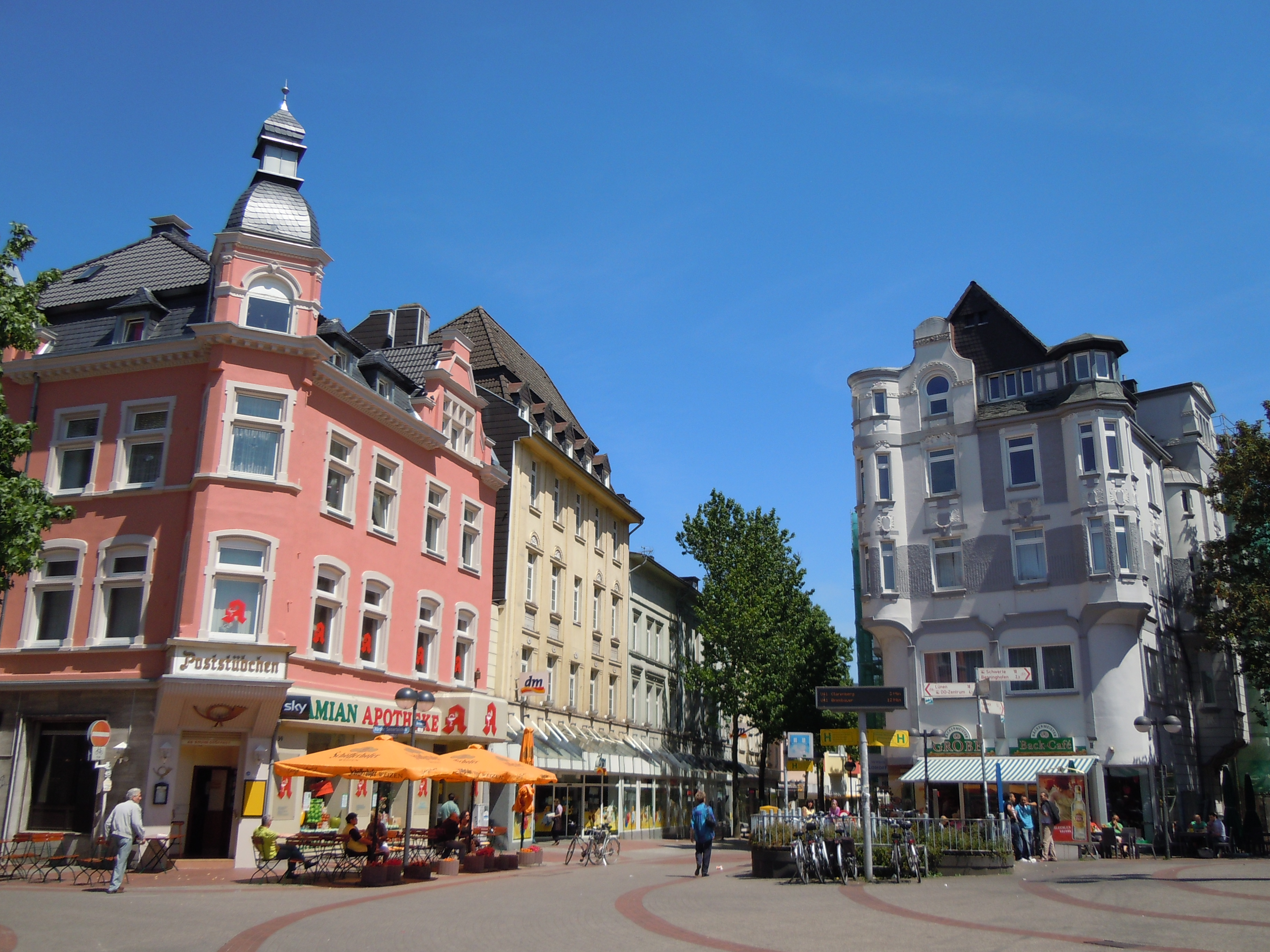
Oldtown Hörde

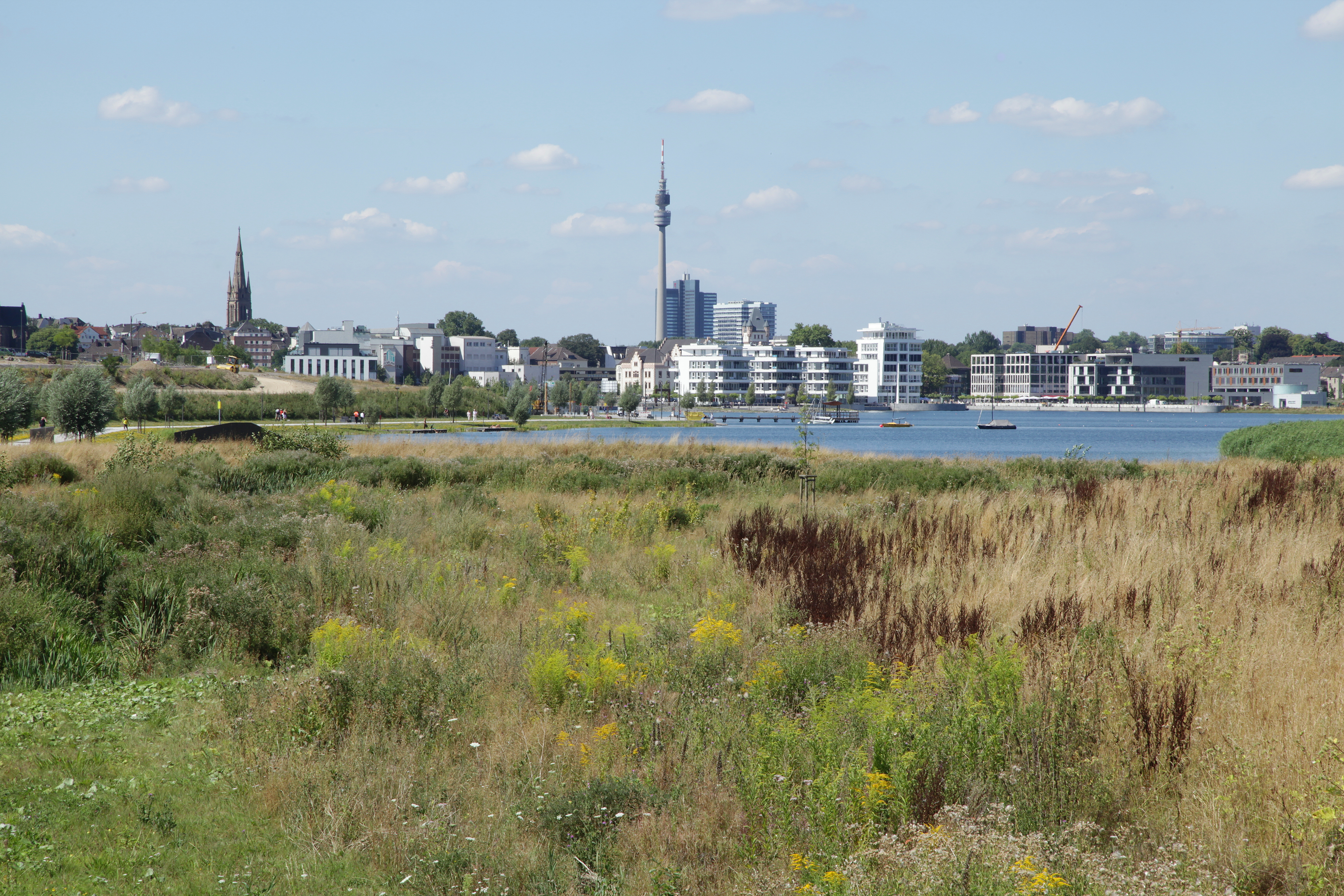
Lake Phoenix

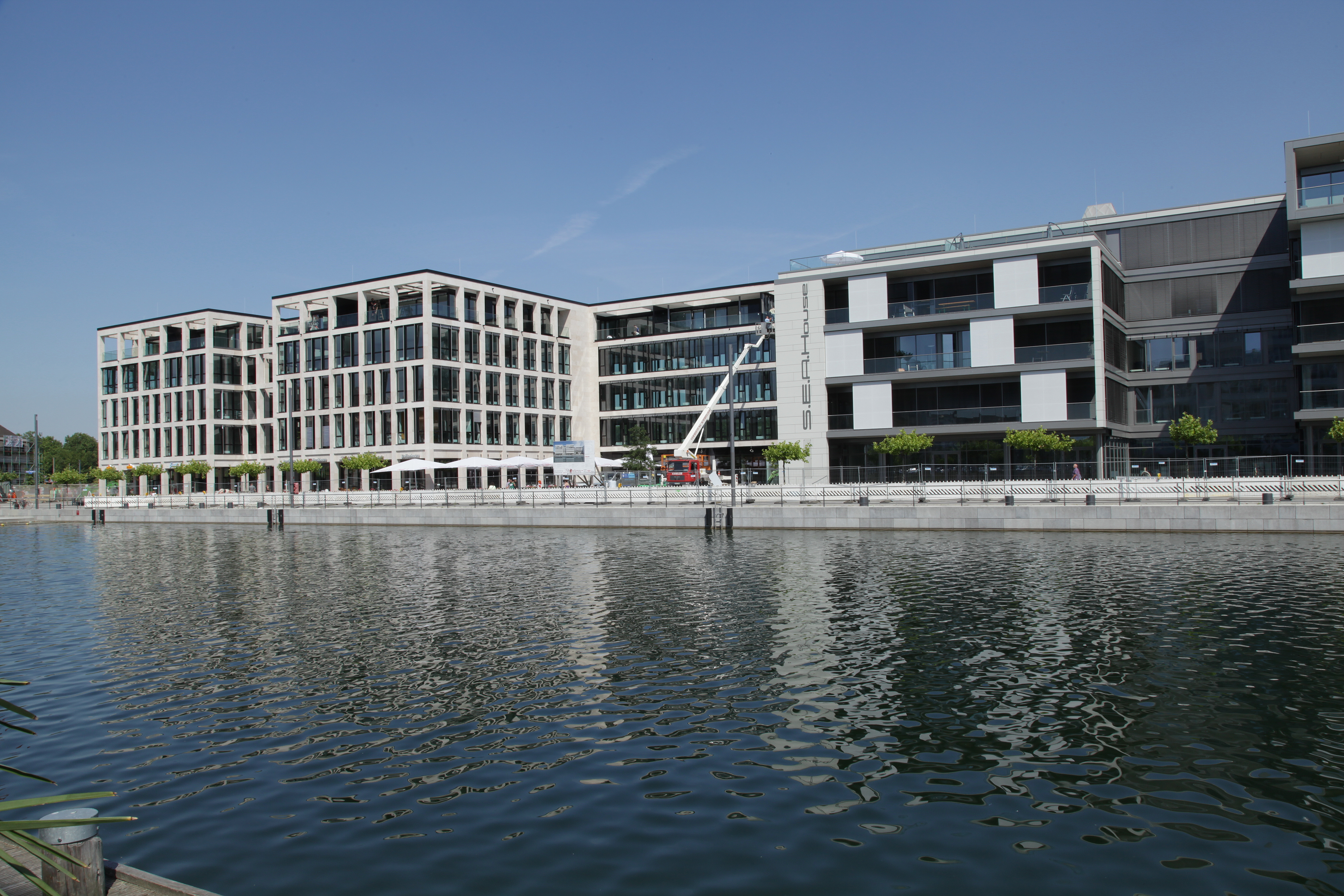
Port Promenade

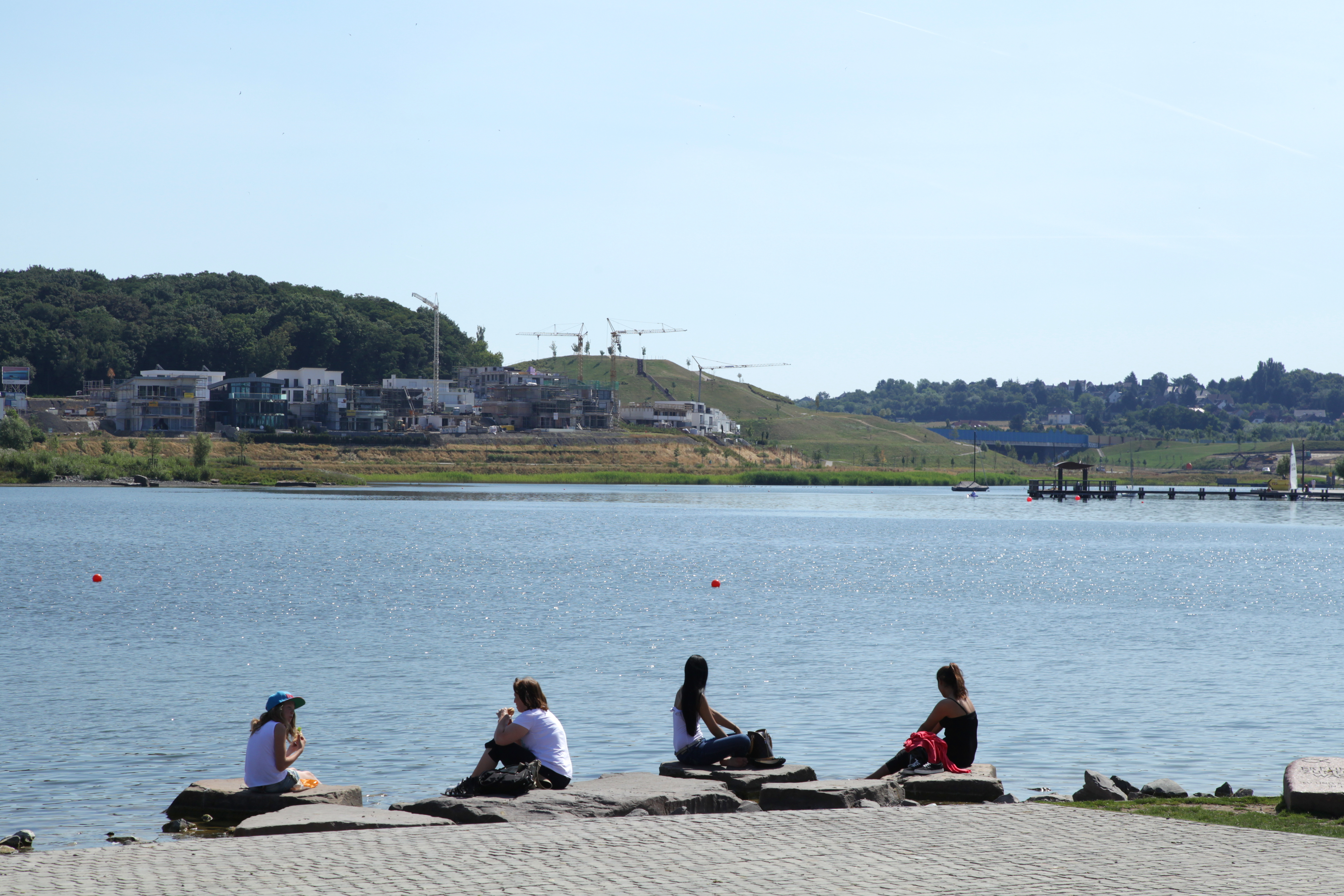
Kaiser Hill

=== Churches ===
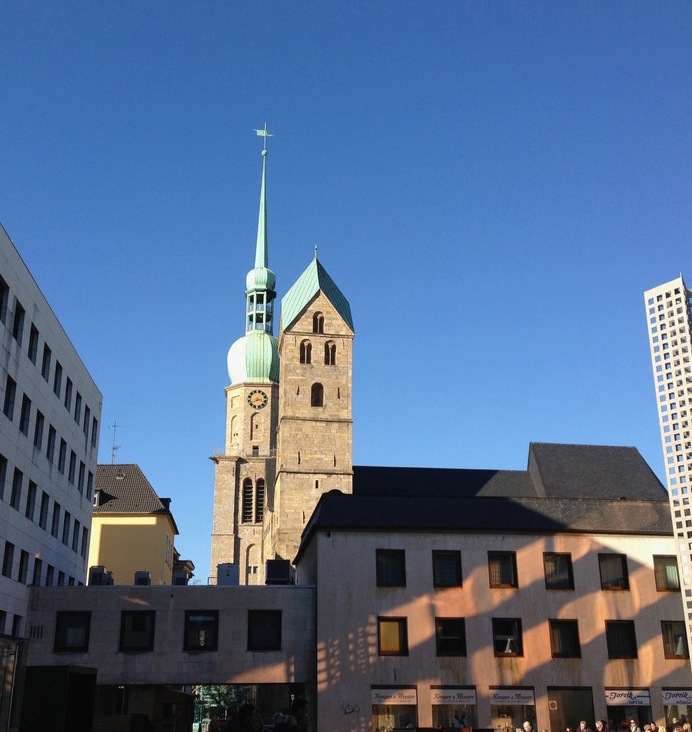
Reinoldikirche and Marienkirche

- Reinoldikirche, a Protestant church (built in 1233–1450)
- Petrikirche, a now Protestant church (start of construction 1322). It is famous for the huge carved altar (known as "Golden Miracle of Dortmund"), from 1521. It consists of 633 gilt carved oak figures depicting 30 scenes about Easter.
- Marienkirche, a now Protestant church originally built in 1170–1200 but rebuilt after World War II. The altar is from 1420.
- Propsteikirche, Monastery of the Dominican Order in the city center (built in 1331–1353)
- St. Georg, Aplerbeck, the only Romanesque cross basilica of Dortmund
- Große Kirche Aplerbeck, a Gothic revival church
- St. Peter in Syburg suburb, the oldest church building in the city limits
- St. Patrokli, Kirchhörde, a 1954 church
- Heilig-Kreuz-Kirche, a Protestant church (start of construction 1911)
- St. Margareta Chapel, a Protestant chapel built in 1348
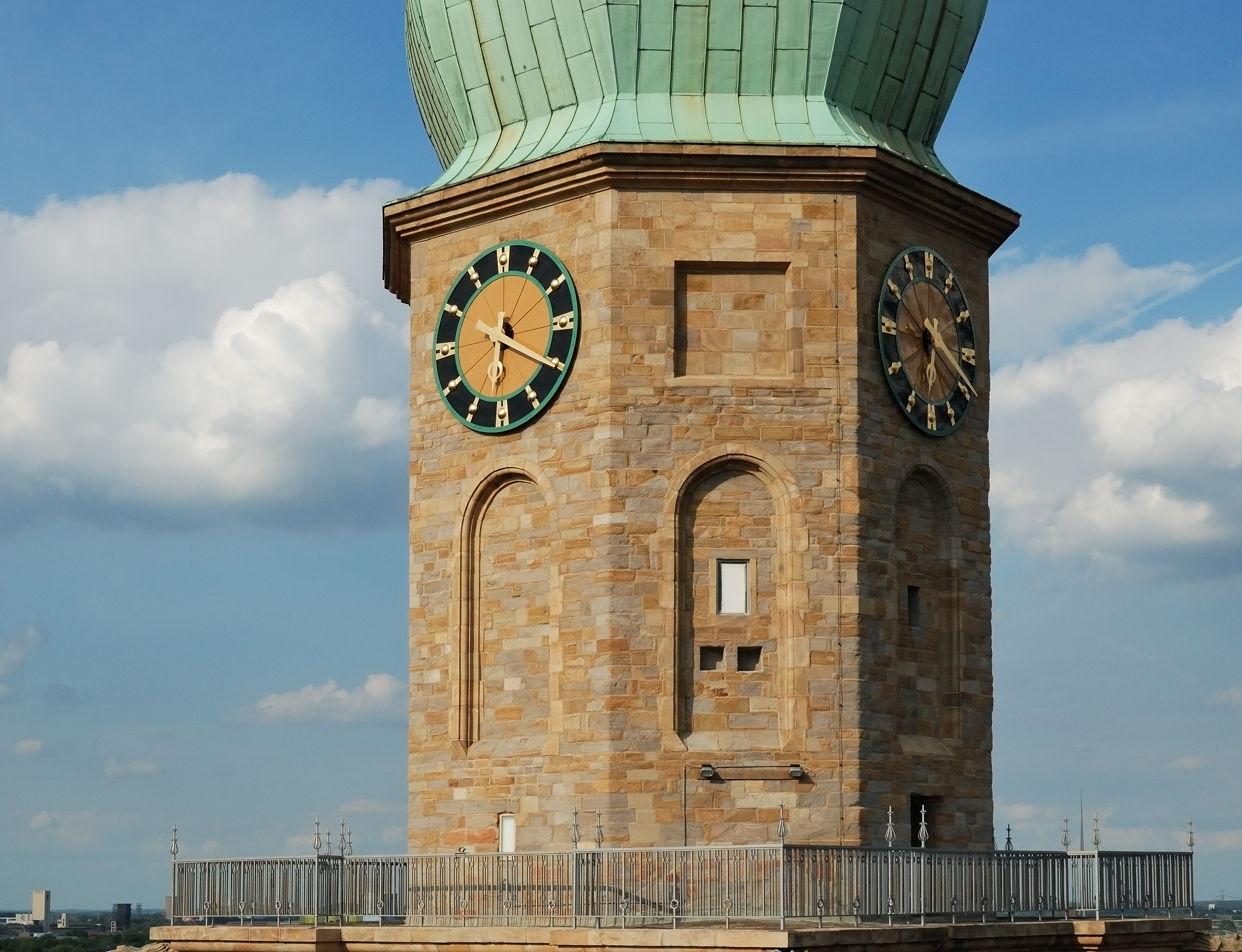
Reinoldikirche

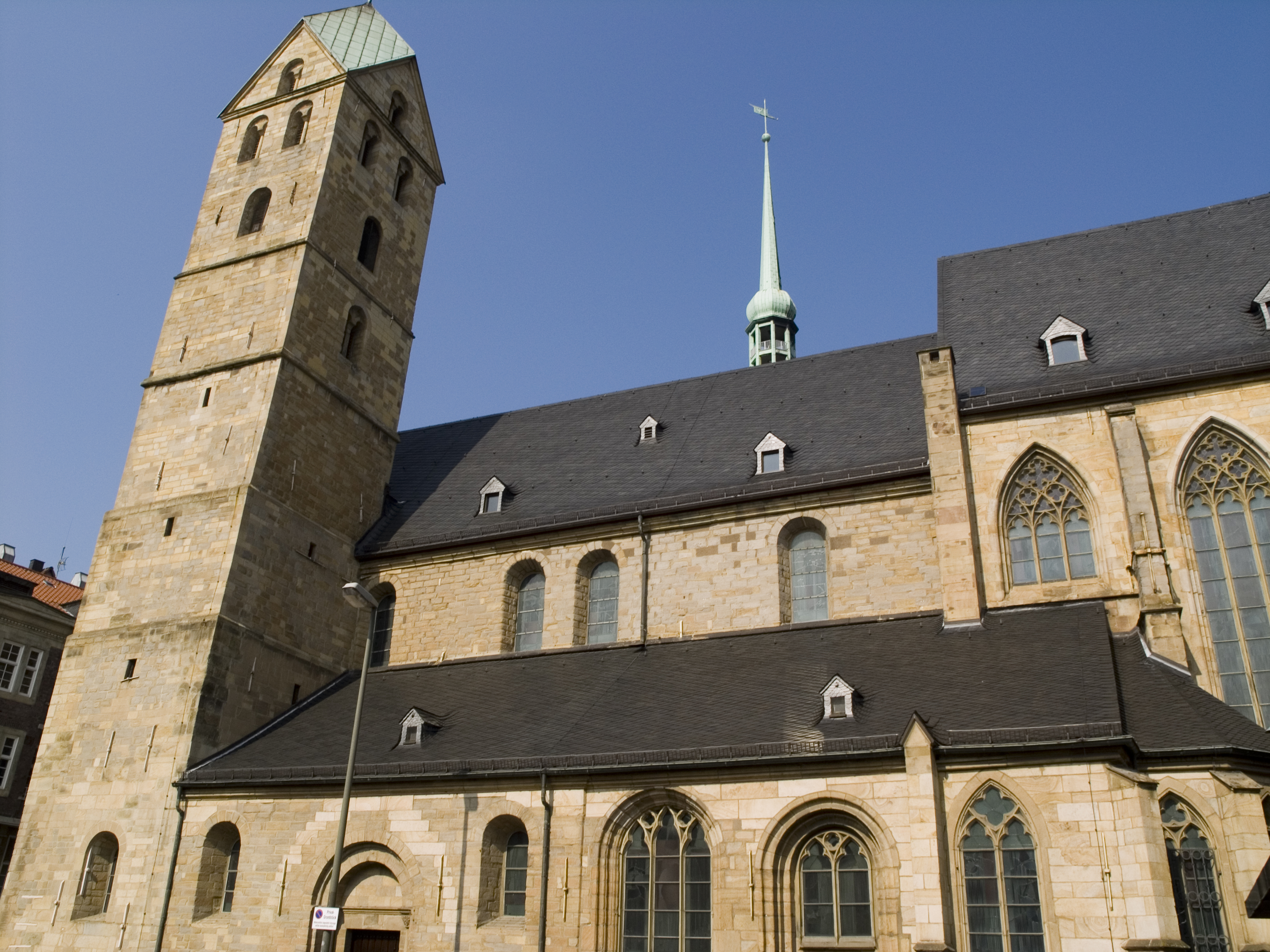
Marienkirche

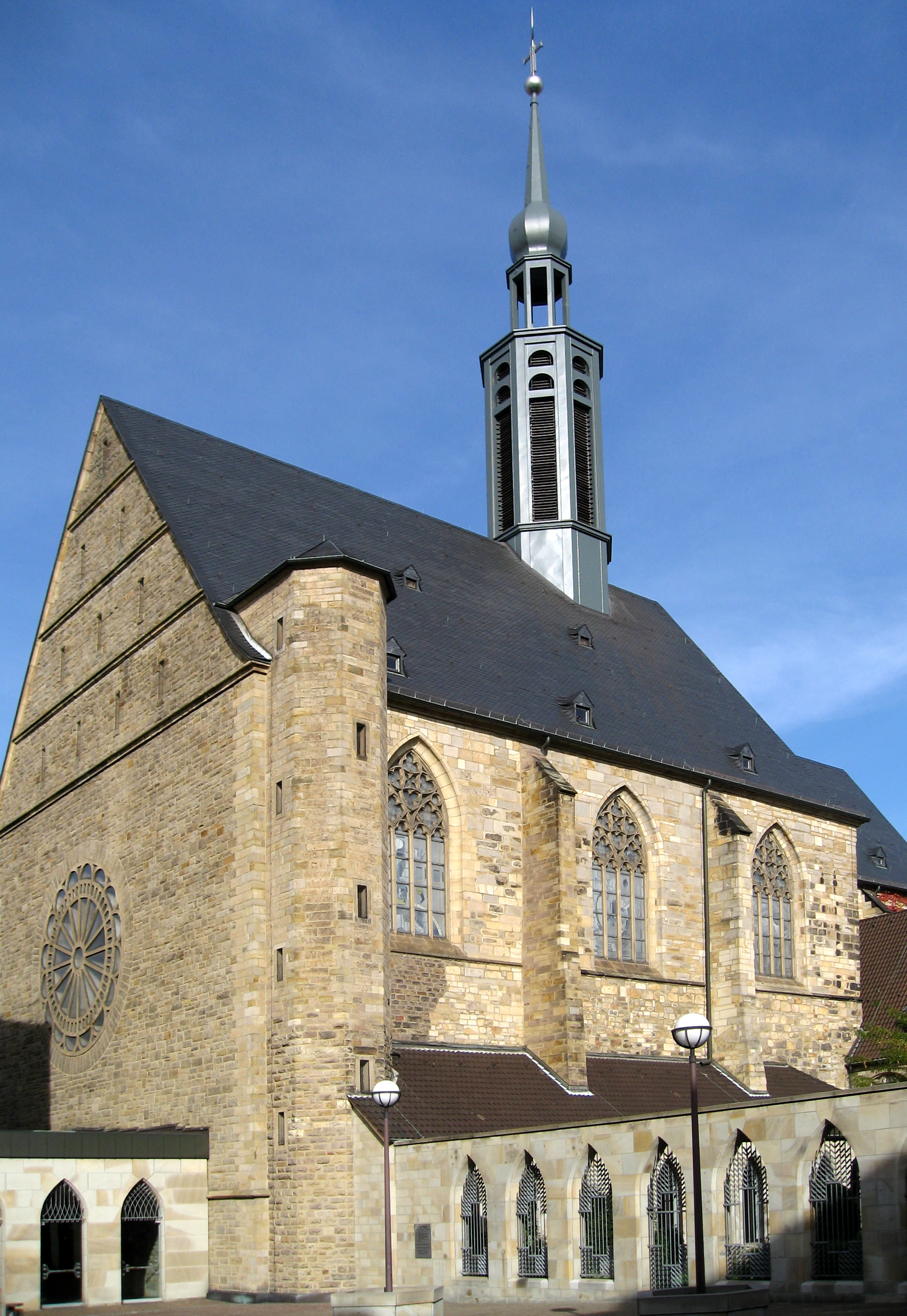
St. Johannes Baptist

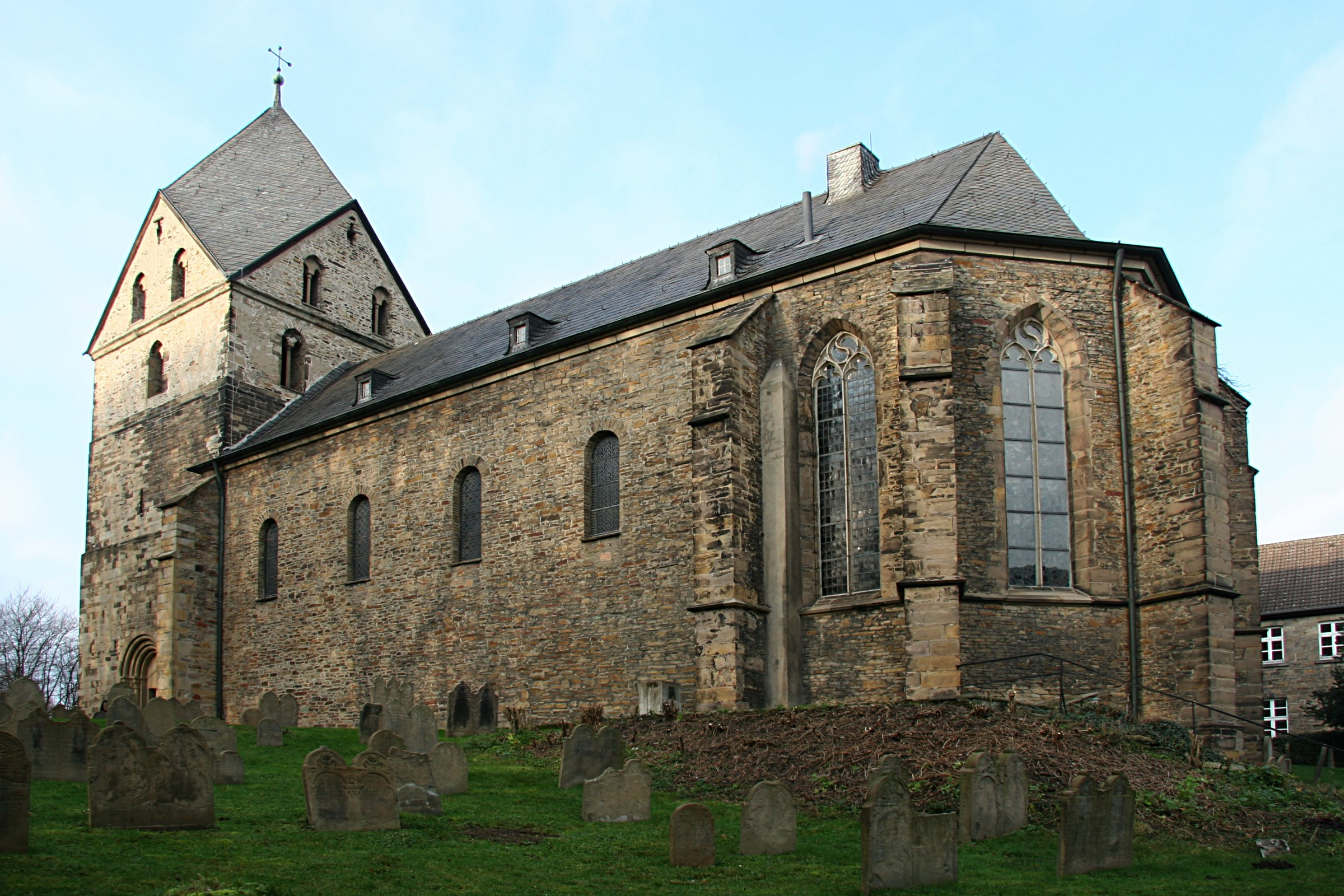
St. Peter in Syburg suburb

=== Castles ===
- Haus Bodelschwingh (13th century), a moated castle
- Haus Dellwig (13th century), a moated castle partly rebuilt in the 17th century. The façade and the steep tower, and two half-timbered buildings, are original.
- Haus Rodenberg (13th century), a moated castle
- Altes Stadthaus, built in 1899 by Friedrich Kullrich
- Romberg Park Gatehouse (17th century), once a gatehouse to a moated castle. Now it houses an art gallery.
- Husen Castle, the tower house of a former castle, in the borough of Syburg
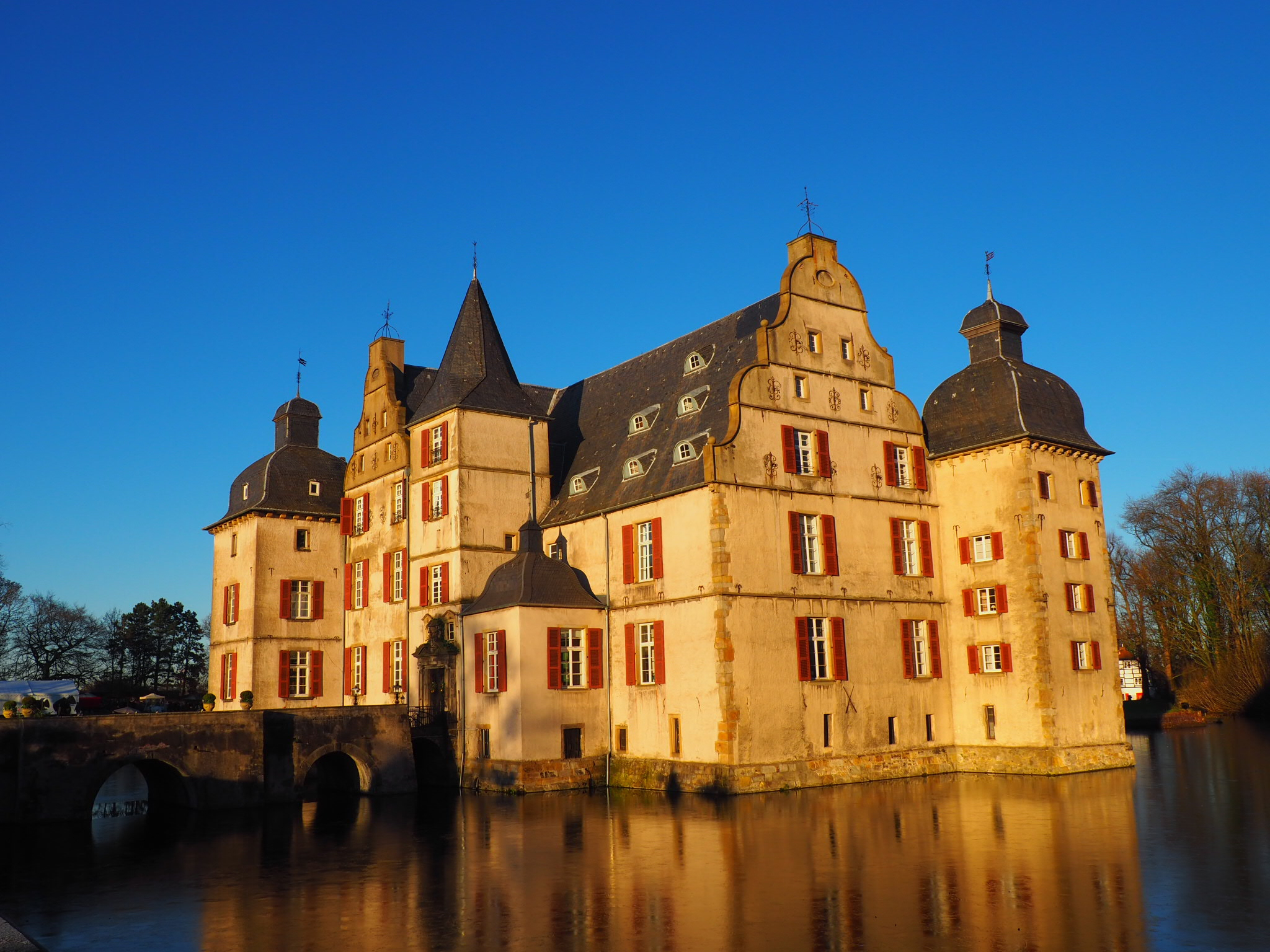
Moated castle Bodelschwingh

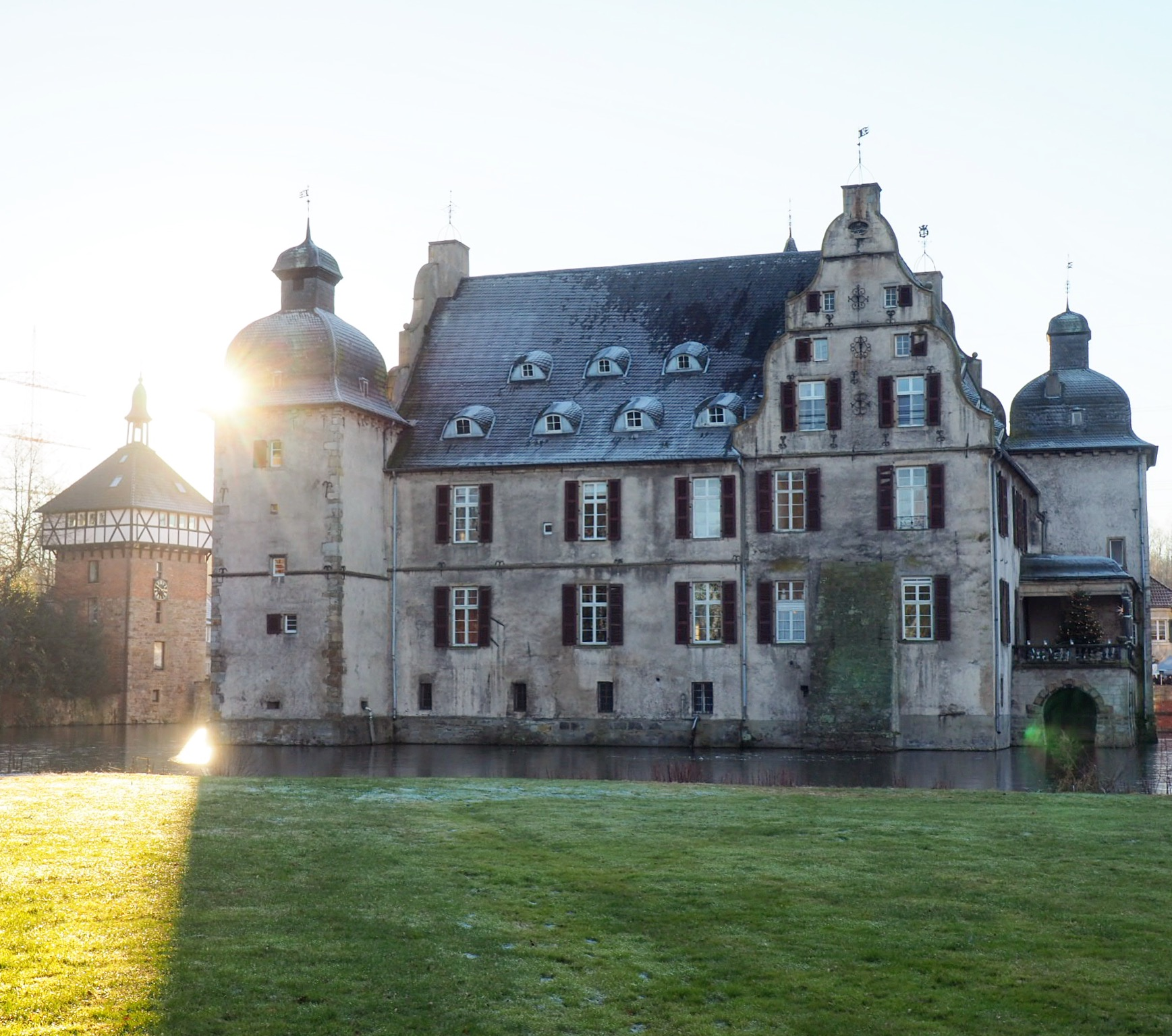
Bodelschwingh garden

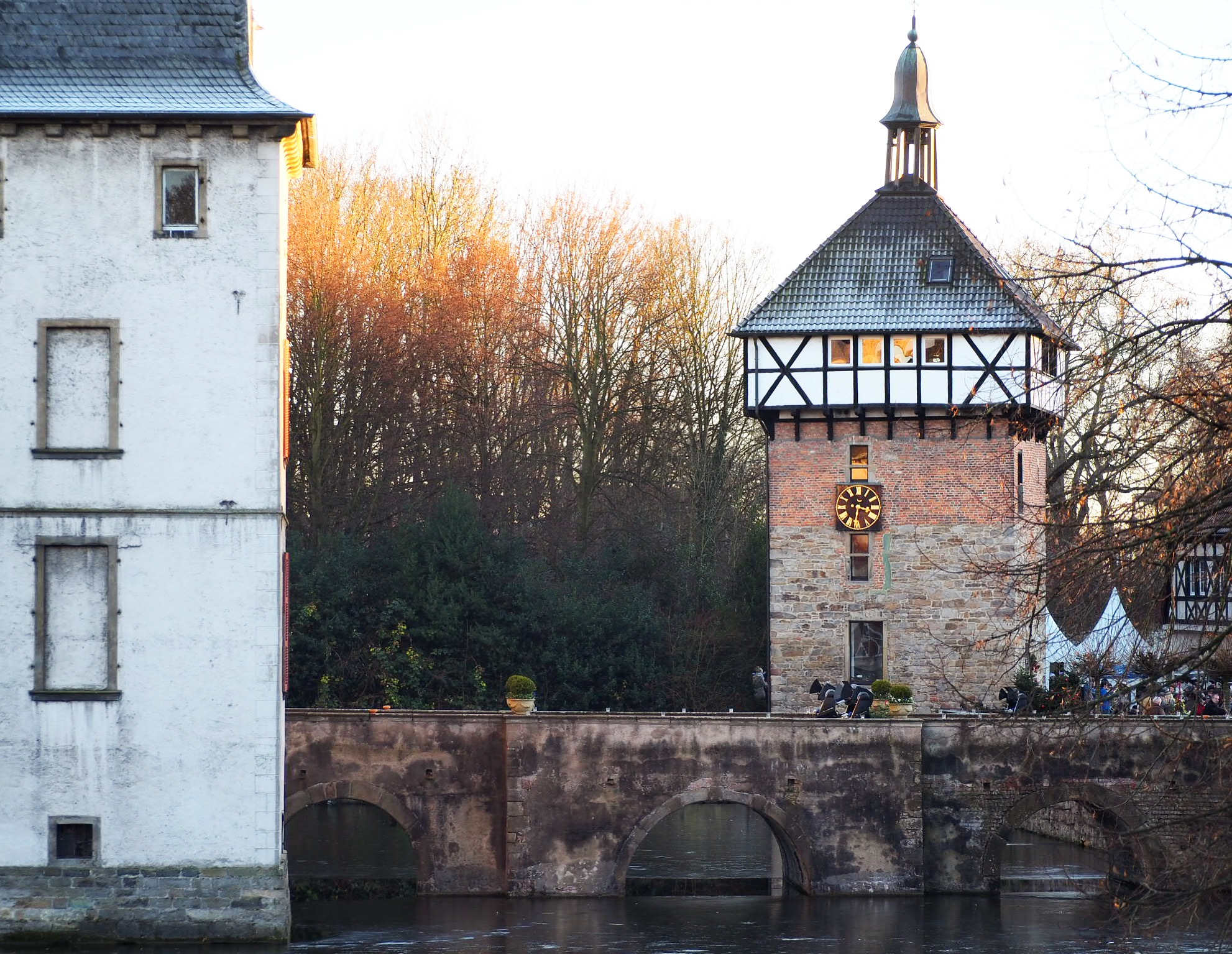
Bodelschwingh bridge

=== Industrial buildings ===
The most industrial building in Dortmund are part of the Industrial Heritage Trail (German: Route der Industriekultur). The trail links tourist attractions related to the industrial heritage in the whole Ruhr area in Germany. It is a part of the European Route of Industrial Heritage.

- U-Tower, former Dortmunder Union brewery, now a museum
- Zollern II/IV Colliery, now part of the Westphalian Industrial Museum and an Anchor Point of the European Route of Industrial Heritage (ERIH)
- Hansa Coking Plant
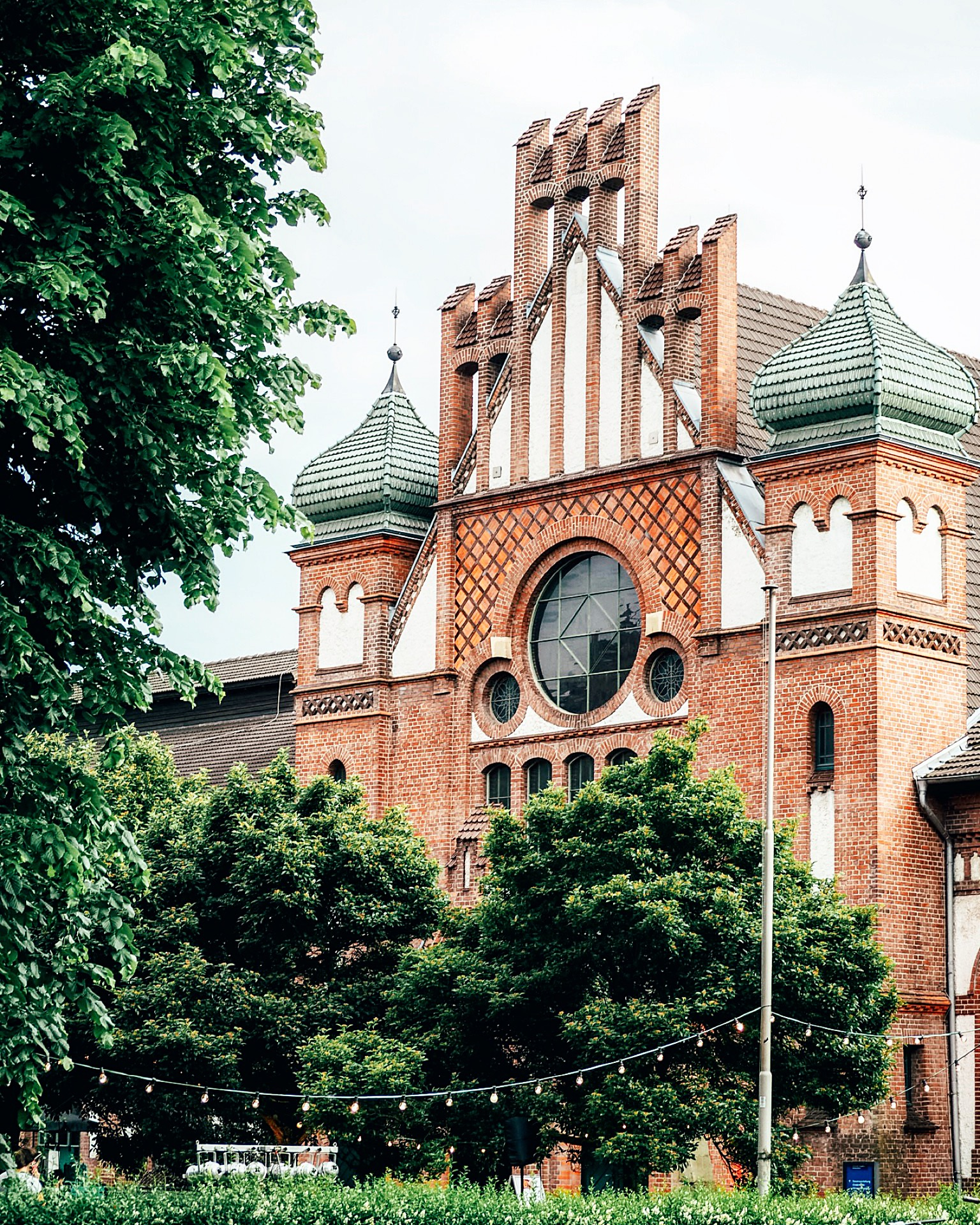
Zollern II/IV Colliery

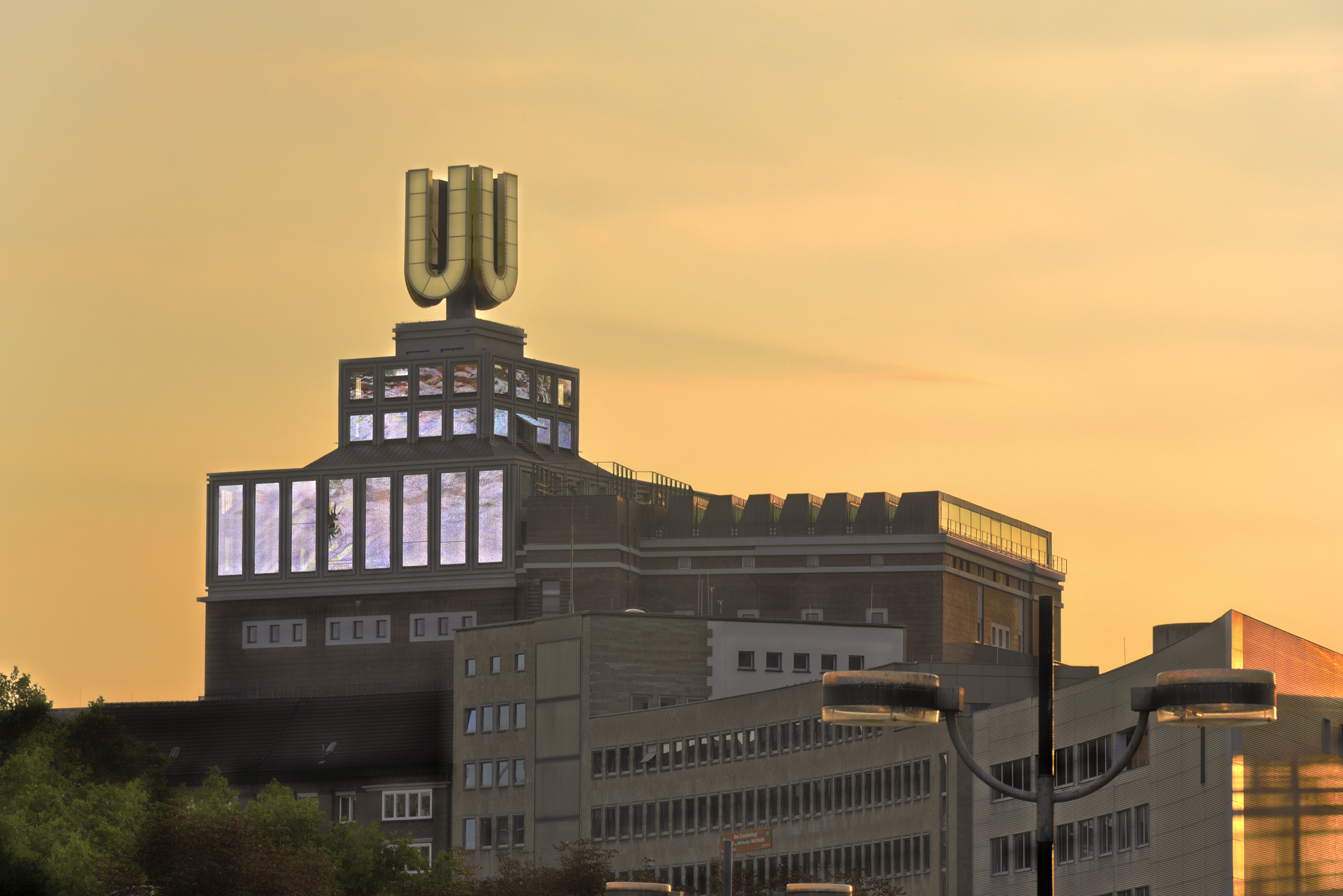
U-Tower

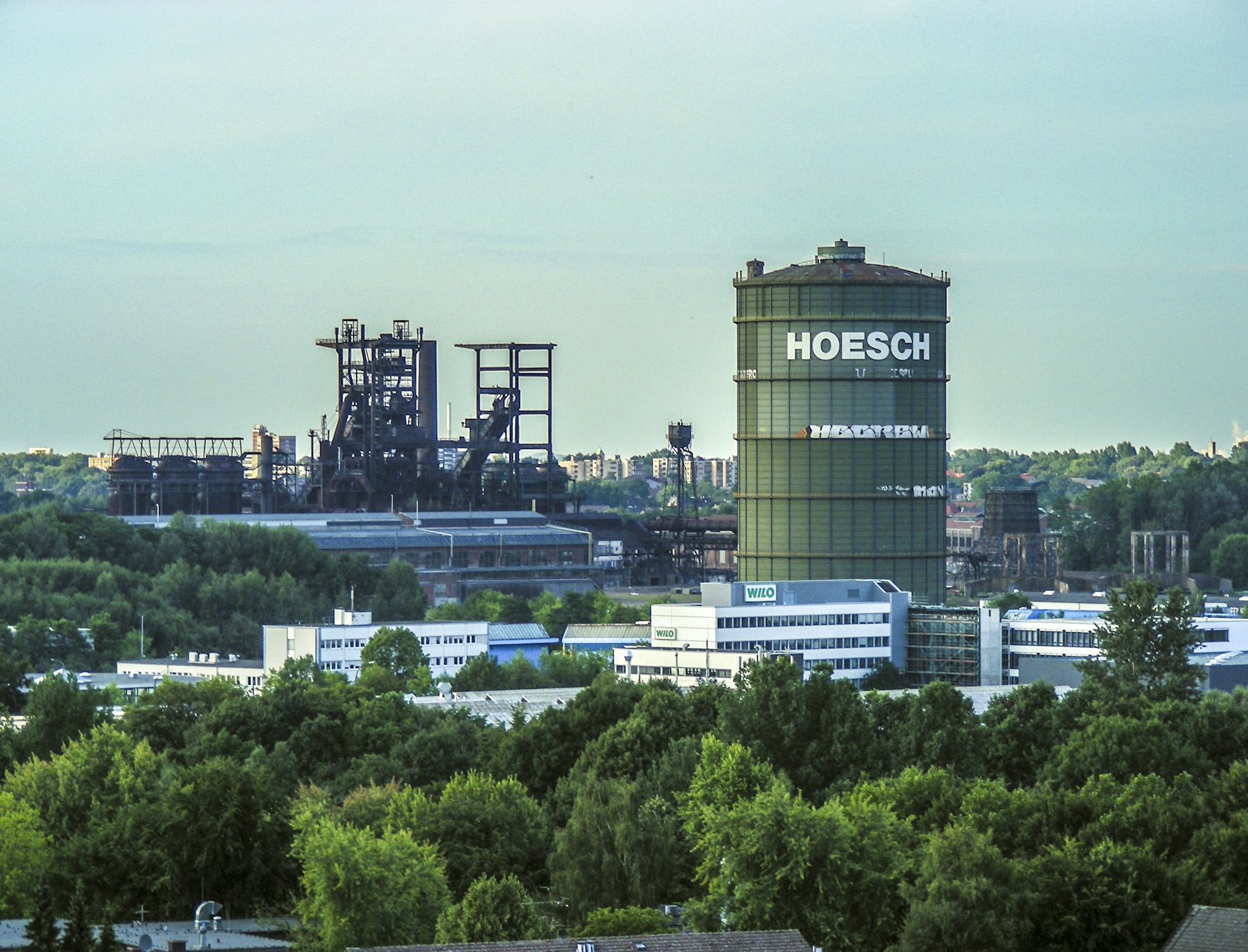
Phoenix-West coking plant

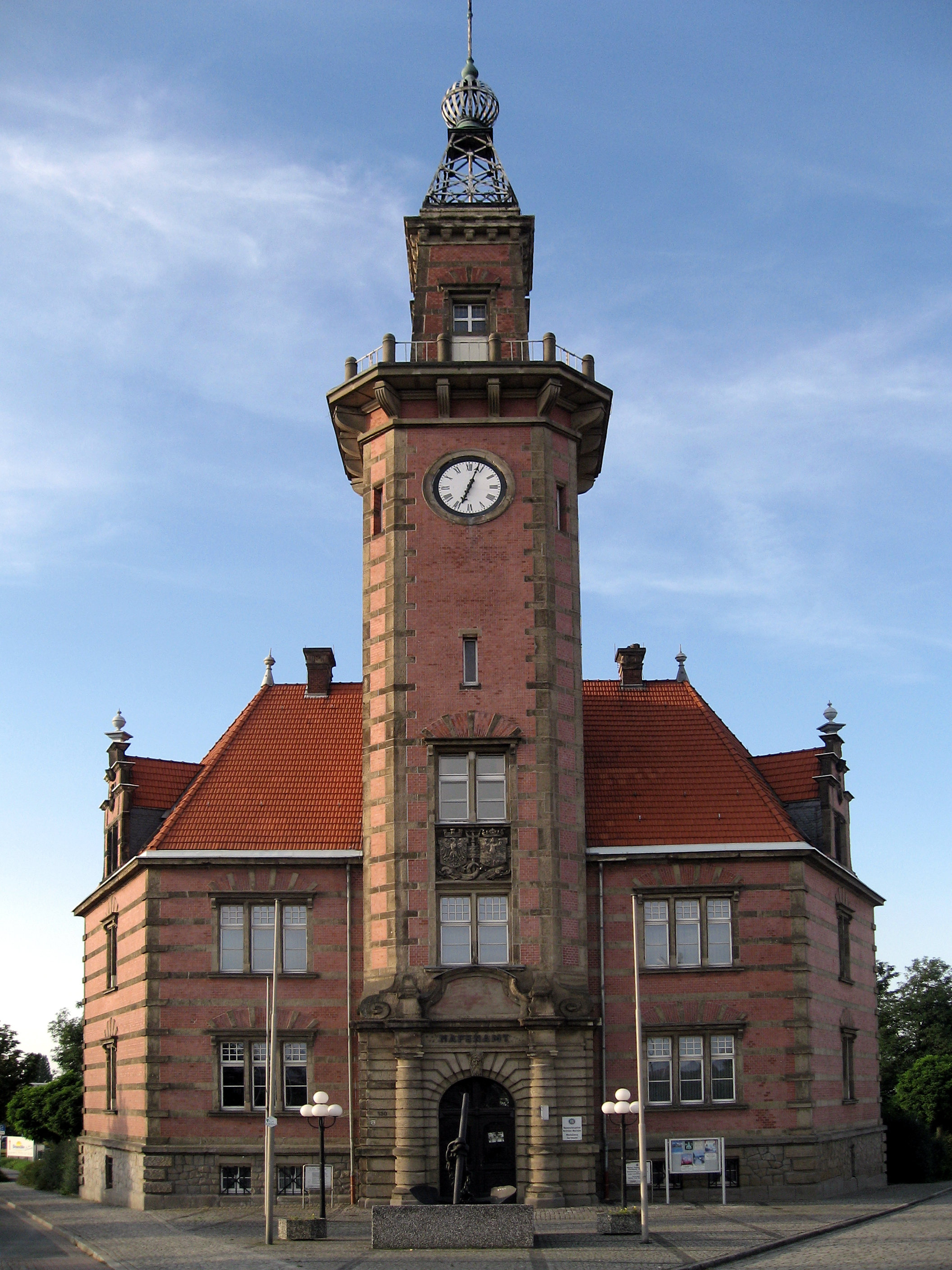
Port Authority

=== Cultural buildings ===
- Konzerthaus Dortmund
- Opernhaus Dortmund, opera house built in 1966 on the site of the old synagogue which was destroyed by the Nazis in 1938.
- The major art museums include the Museum für Kunst und Kulturgeschichte and the more recent Museum Ostwall.
- DASA, Germany Occupational Health and Safety Exhibition (German: Deutsche Arbeitsschutzausstellung)
- Brewery Museum Dortmund
- Museum of Art and Cultural History
- German Football Museum
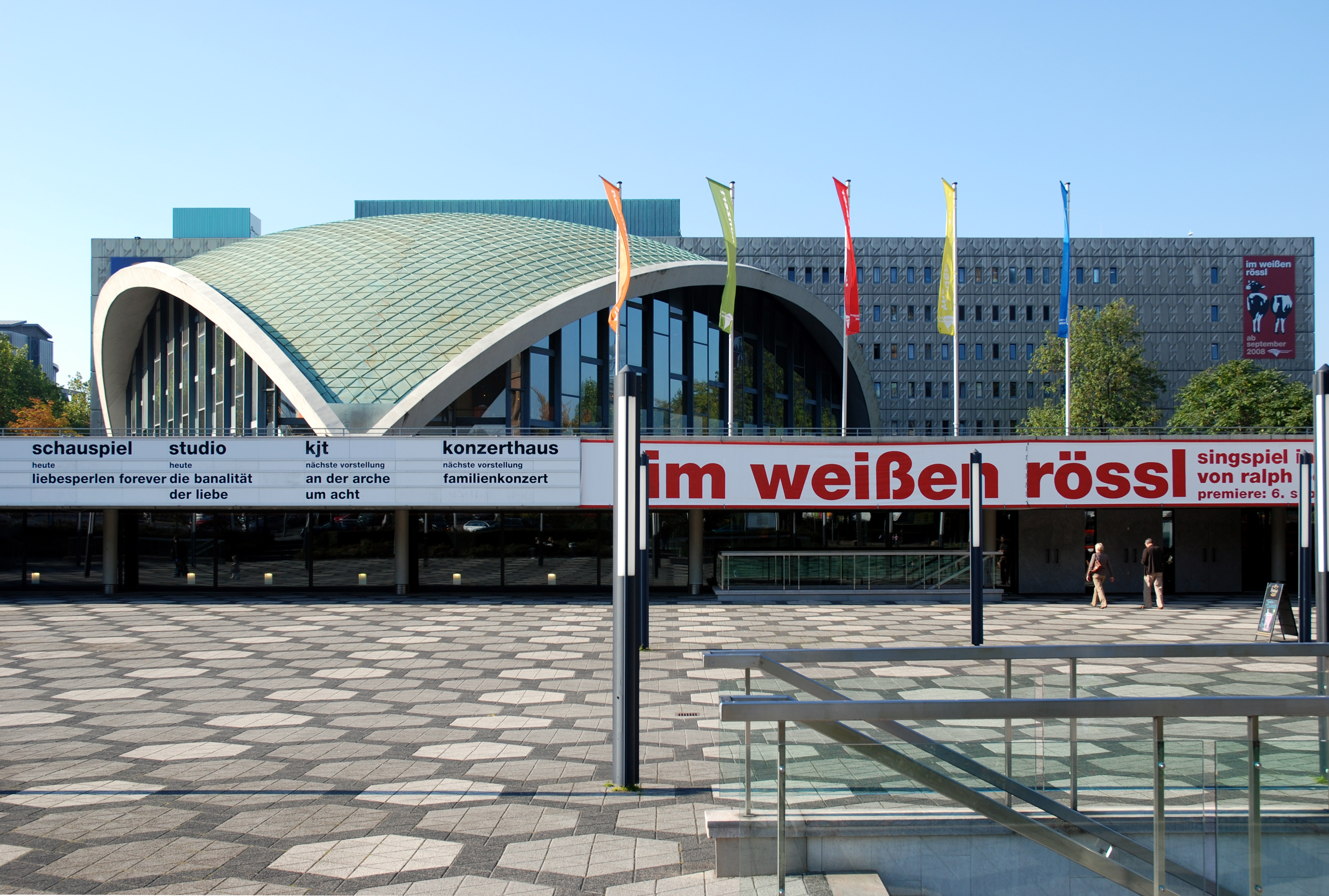
Opernhaus Dortmund

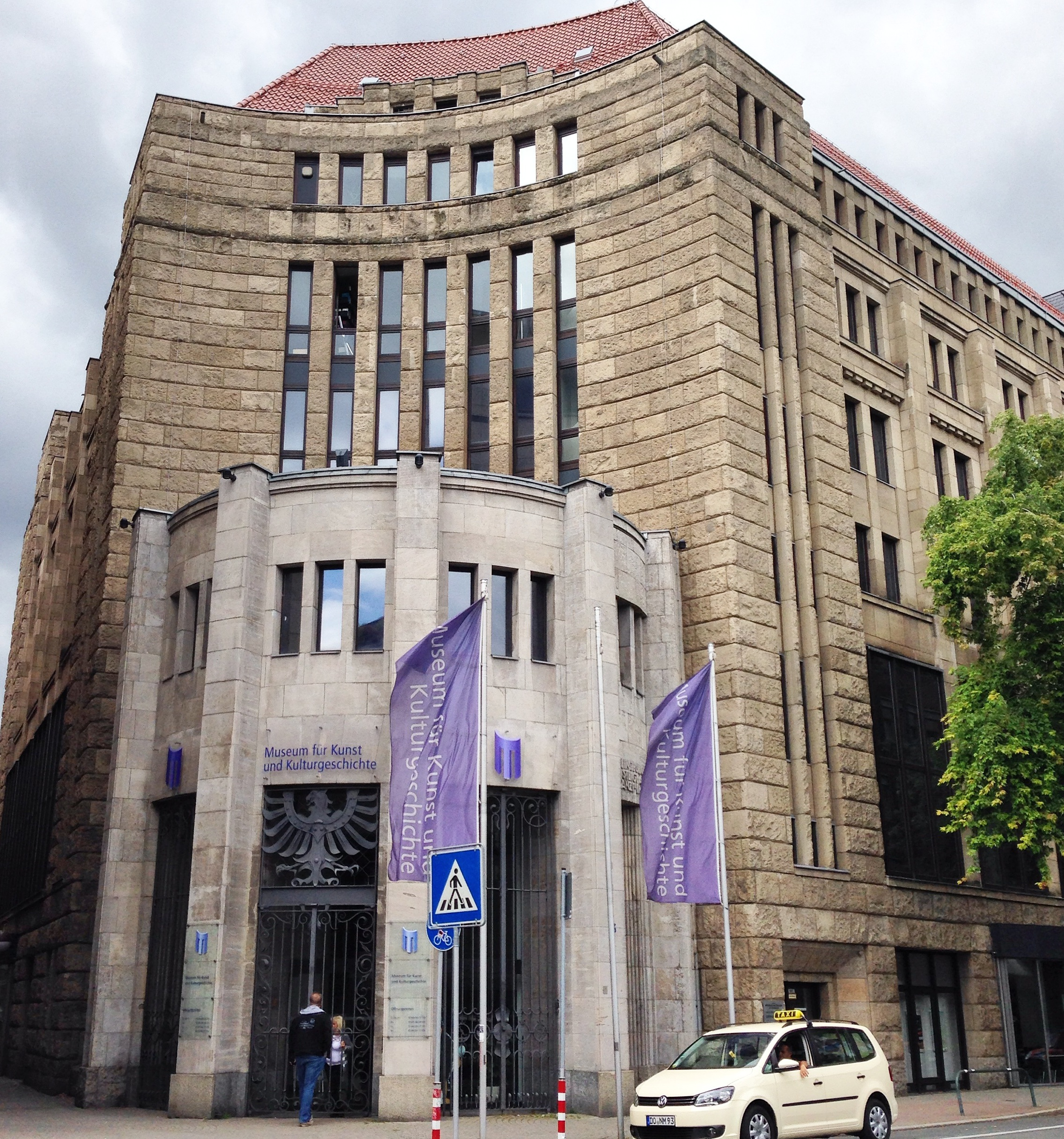
Museum für Kunst und Kulturgeschichte

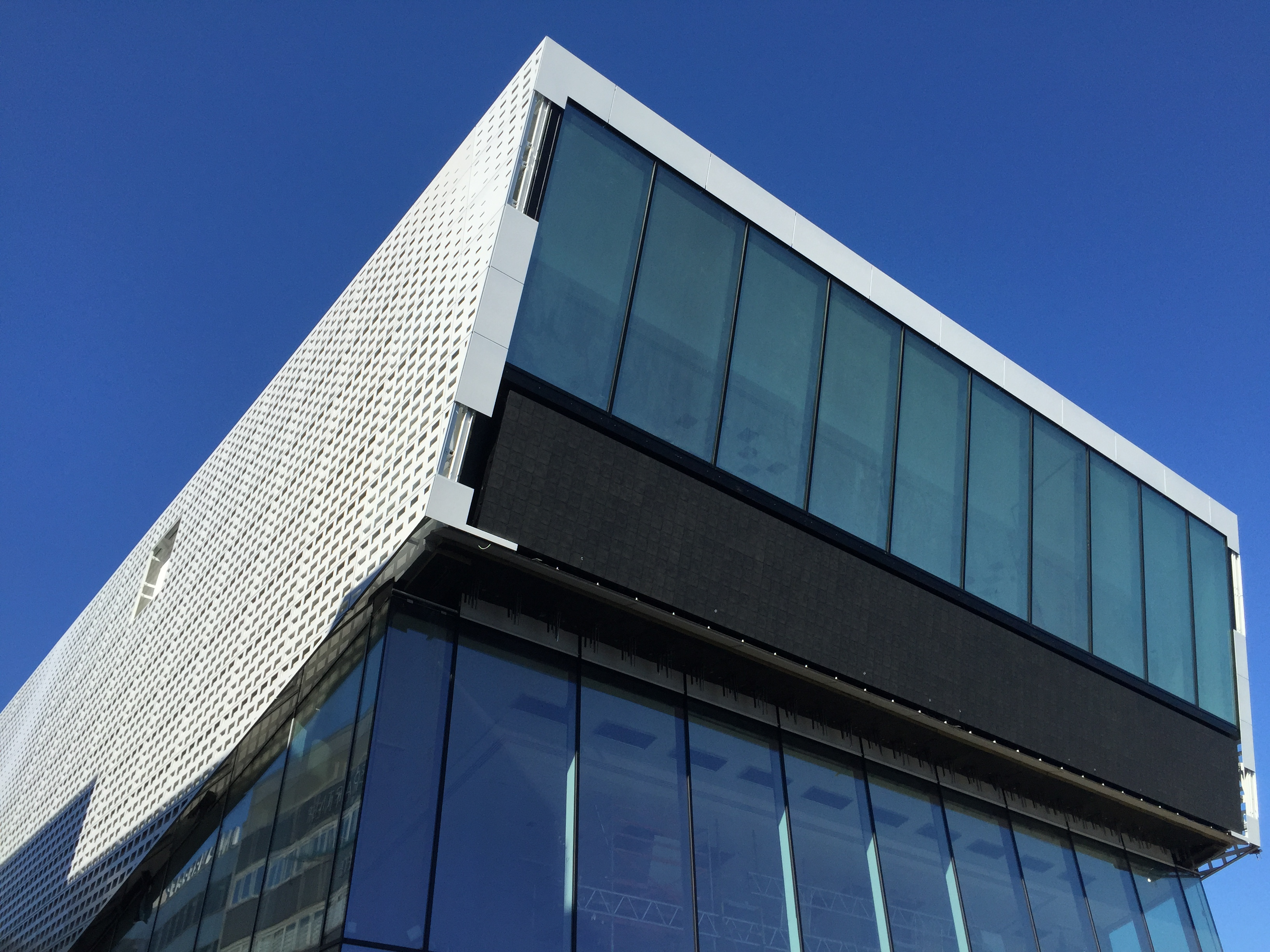
German Football Museum

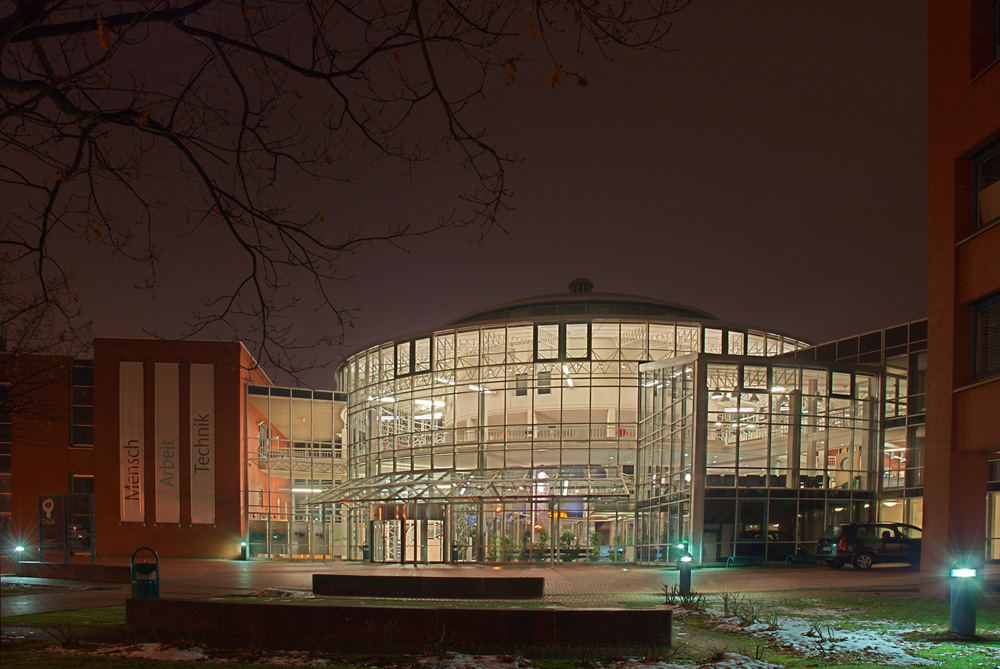
DASA, Germany Occupational Health and Safety Exhibition

=== Other important buildings ===
- Florianturm (television tower Florian)
- Westfalenstadion: football ground of Borussia Dortmund, licensed until 2021 under the name Signal Iduna Park
- Close to Westfalenstadion are the Westfalenhallen, a large convention centre, the site of several major conventions, trade fairs, ice-skating competitions, concerts and other major events since the 1950s.
- Steinwache memorial

=== High-rise structures ===
Dortmund tallest structure is the Florianturm telecommunication tower at 266 m or 873 ft. Other tall buildings are the churches around the city centre. A selection of the tallest office buildings in Dortmund is listed below.

- RWE Tower (100 metre-high skyscraper)
- Westnetz Hochhaus Dortmund (100 metre-high skyscraper)
- Westfalentower (88 metre-high skyscraper)
- Harenberg City-Center (86 metre-high skyscraper)
- Sparkassen-Hochhaus (70 metre-high skyscraper)
- IWO-Hochhaus(70 metre-high skyscraper)
- Ellipson (66 metre-high skyscraper)
- Volkswohl Bund Hochhaus (60 metre-high skyscraper)
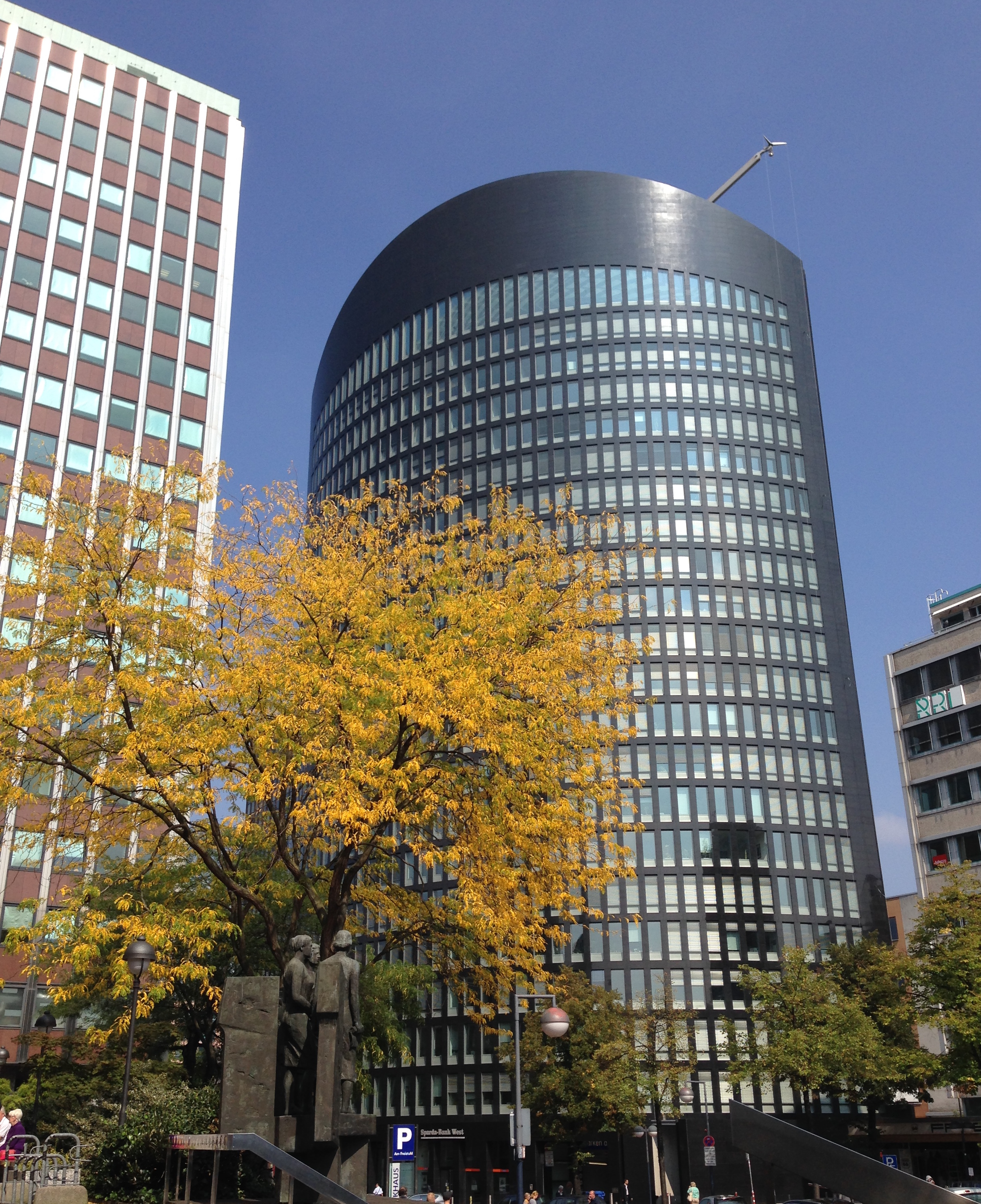
RWE Tower

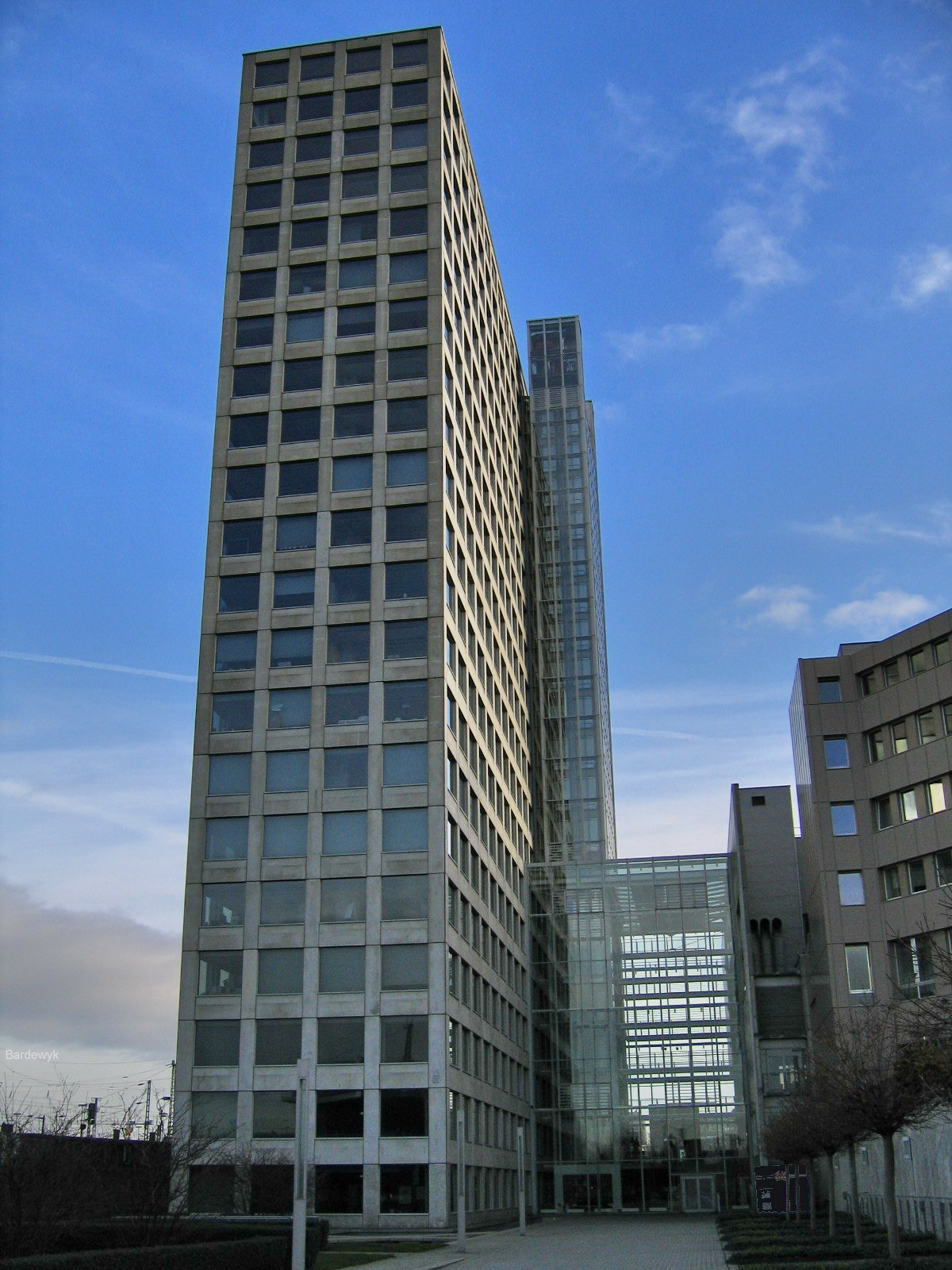
HCC

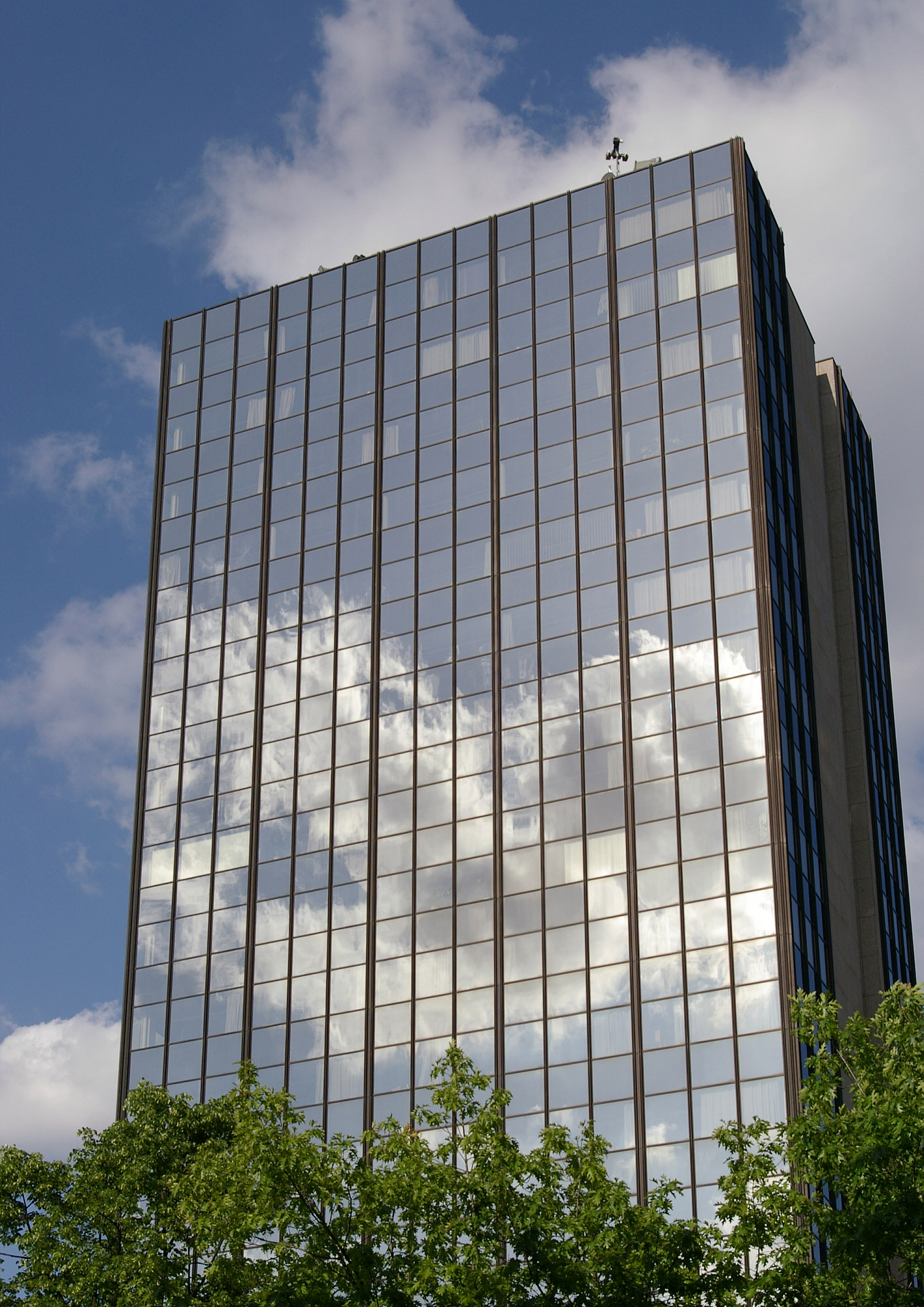
IWO Tower

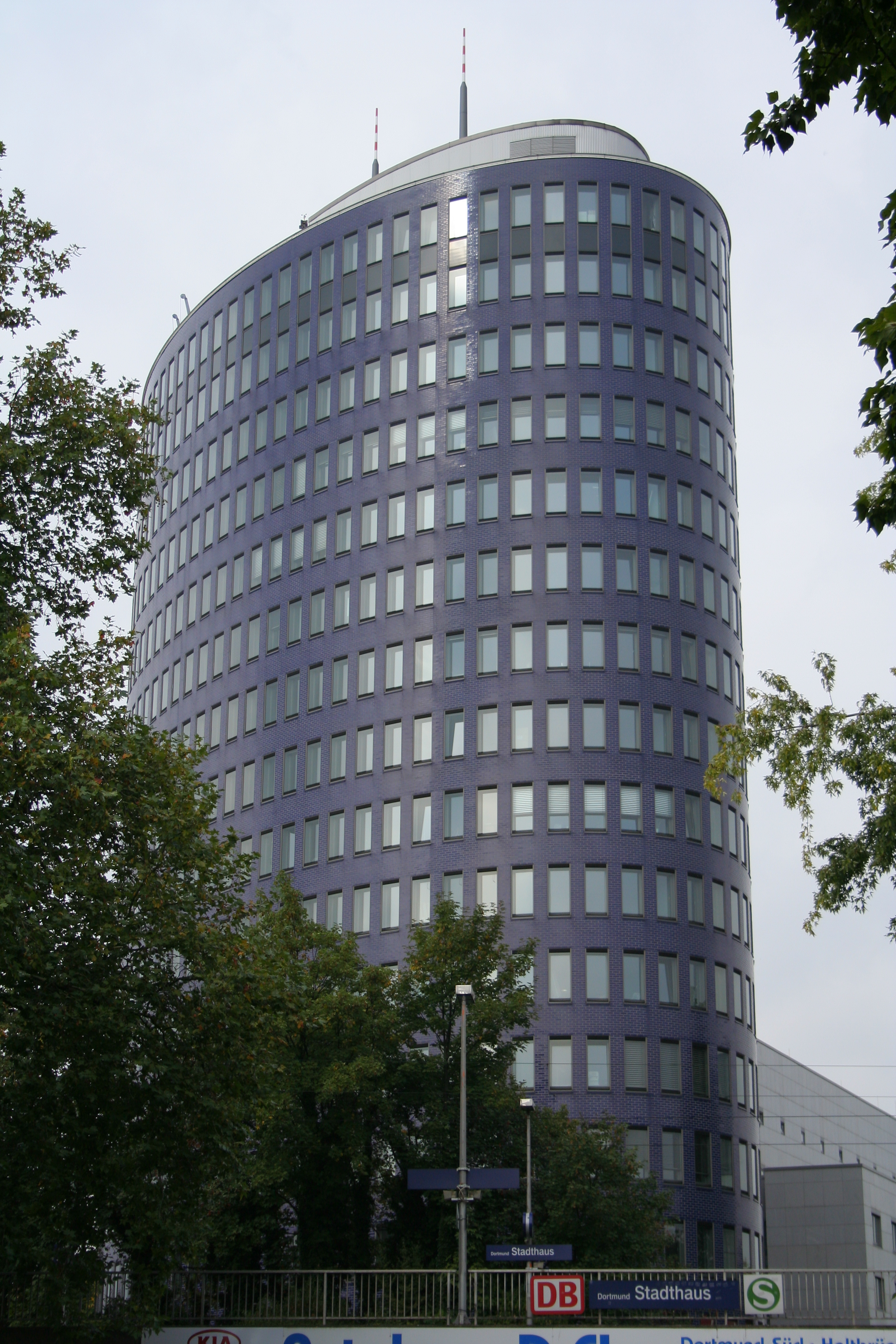
Ellipson

== Transportation ==
=== Road transport ===
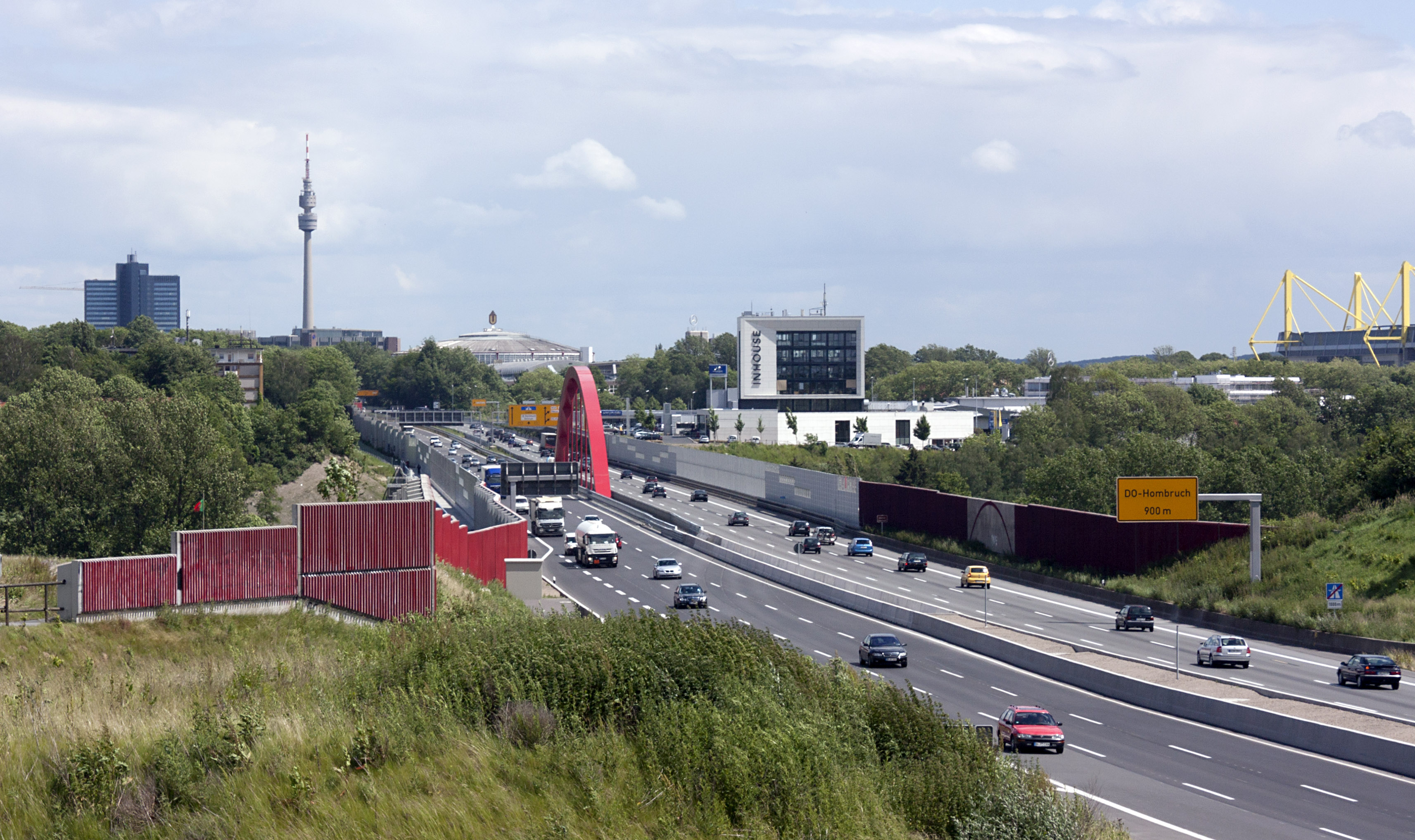
The Ruhrschnellweg Section East Dortmund

Dortmund also serves as a major European and German crossroads for the Autobahnsystem. The Ruhrschnellweg follows old Hanseatic trade routes to connect the city with the other metropolises of the Ruhr Area. It crosses the Dutch-German border as a continuation of the Dutch A67 and crosses the Rhine, leads through the Ruhr valley toward Bochum, becoming B 1 (Bundesstraße 1) at the Kreuz Dortmund West and eventually merging into the A 44 near Holzwickede. It has officially been named Ruhrschnellweg (Ruhr Fast Way), but locals usually call it Ruhrschleichweg (Ruhr Crawling Way) or "the Ruhr area's longest parking lot". According to Der Spiegel, it is the most congested motorway in Germany.

Connections to more distant parts of Germany are maintained by Autobahn routes A1 and A2, which traverse the north and east city limits and meet at the Kamener Kreuz interchange north-east of Dortmund. In combination with the Autobahn A45 to the west these form the Dortmund Beltway (Dortmunder Autobahnring).

=== Cycling ===
Cycling in Dortmund is supported by urban planners – an extensive network of cycle paths exists which had its beginnings in the 1980s. Dortmund was admitted to the German "Association of Pedestrian and Bicycle-Friendly Cities and Municipalities in NRW" (AGFS) on 8 August 2007. Dortmund is connected to a number of long-distance cycle paths and a Bike freeway called the Radschnellweg Ruhr (Ruhr Area Fast Cycle Path).

=== Rail transport ===
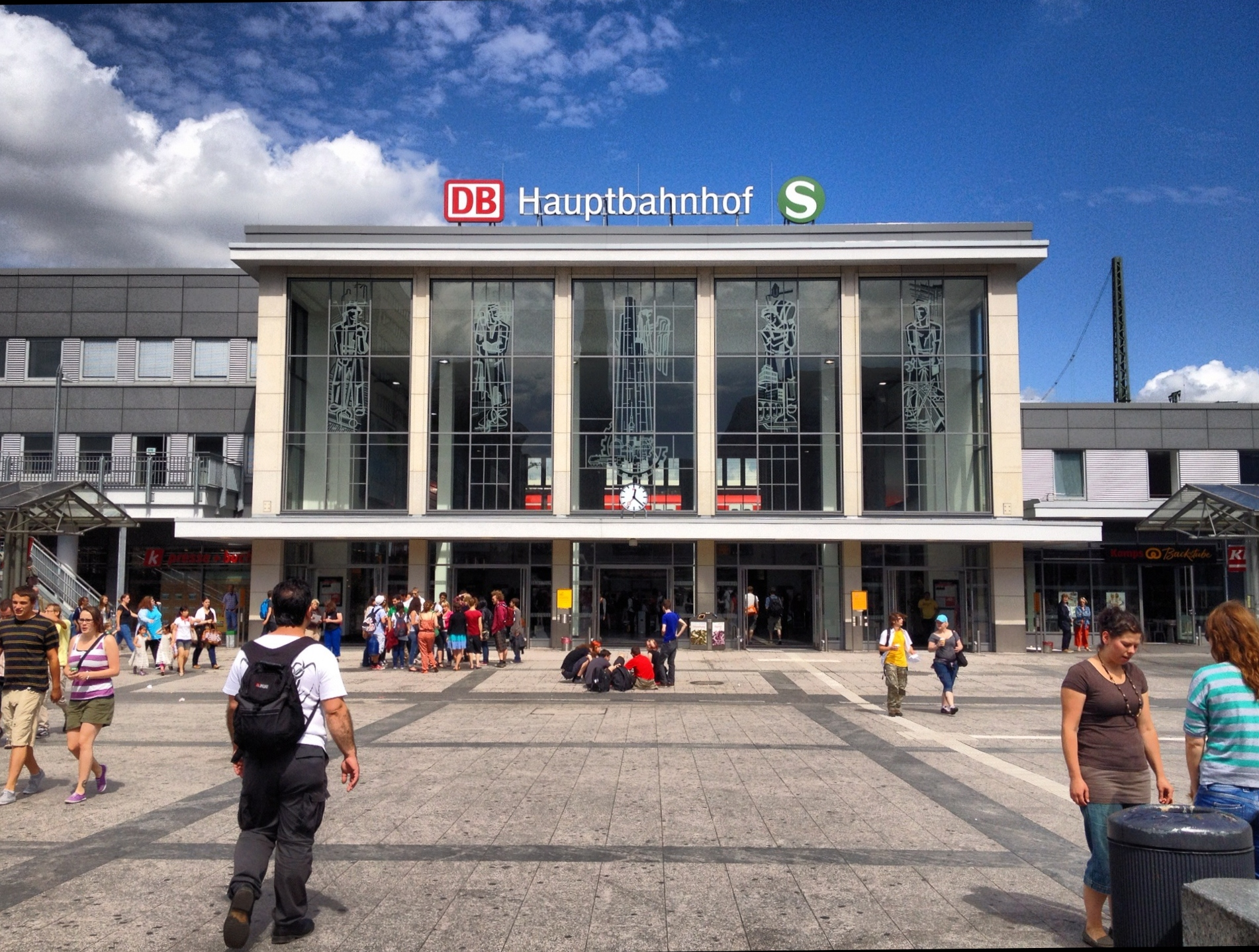
Dortmund central railway station

The central train station, Dortmund Hauptbahnhof, is the third largest long-distance traffic junction in Germany. The station is served by various Deutsche Bahn InterCity and ICE long-distance services. There are frequent ICE trains to other German cities, including Frankfurt am Main, Berlin and other cities in the Rhein-Ruhr region. The station is also served by open-access rail operator Eurostar, whose long-distance trains link Dortmund with international destinations including Amsterdam Centraal, Brussels-South and Paris Gare du Nord.

Regional train services are tendered by Verkehrsverbund Rhein-Ruhr (VRR), the local association of public transport companies in the Ruhr area, which provides a uniform fare structure in the whole region. Currently, regional train services in Dortmund are operated by DB Regio, National Express Germany, Eurobahn, Vias and Hessische Landesbahn. Within the VRR region, tickets are valid on lines of all of its member companies as well as Deutsche Bahn's railway lines (except high-speed trains) and can be bought at ticket machines and service centres of DSW21, all other members of VRR, and DB.

=== Public transportation ===
Local public transportation is largely operated by the city-owned transit operator Dortmunder Stadtwerke (DSW21). The city has an extensive light rail (Stadtbahn) and bus system. The Stadtbahn consists of eight lines (U41 to U47 and U49) serving Dortmund and the neighbouring city of Lünen to the north. The lines are mostly overground with tracks running in the alongside streets, with three underground sections in the city centre shared by multiple lines. The minimum service interval is 2.5 minutes, although the usual pattern is that each line runs at 5 to 10 minute intervals. On Sundays the trains run at a 15-minute interval. In April 2008, the newly constructed east–west underground light rail line was opened, completing the underground service in the city centre and replacing the last trams on the surface.

A number of bus lines complete the Dortmund public transport system. Night buses replace Stadtbahn services between 1:30 am and 7:30 am on weekends and public holidays. The central junction for the night bus service is Reinoldikirche in the city centre, where all night bus lines start and end.

The H-Bahn at Technical University of Dortmund is a hanging monorail built specifically to shuttle passengers between the university's two campuses, which are now also flanked by research laboratories and other high-tech corporations and startups. A nearly identical monorail system transfers passengers at Düsseldorf Airport.

=== Air transport ===
Dortmund Airport is a minor international airport 13 km (8.1 mi) east of the city centre. Whilst located within city limits in Wickede, it is only accessible via the neighbouring muncipality of Holzwickede. The airport serves the area of the Ruhrgebiet, Sauerland, Westphalia and parts of the Netherlands, with airlines offering flights mostly to leisure destinations including Palma de Mallorca and various eastern European cities. The airport is served by an express bus to Dortmund main station, a shuttle bus to the nearby railway station Holzwickede/Dortmund Flughafen, a bus to the city's metro line U47, as well as a bus to the neighbouring city of Unna.

In 2019, the airport served 2,719,563 passengers mainly used for low-cost and leisure charter flights. The closest major international airport is Düsseldorf Airport.

=== Water transport ===
Dortmund Harbour (Hafen) is the largest canal harbour in Europe and the 11th fluvial harbour in Germany.

Transport in Dortmund

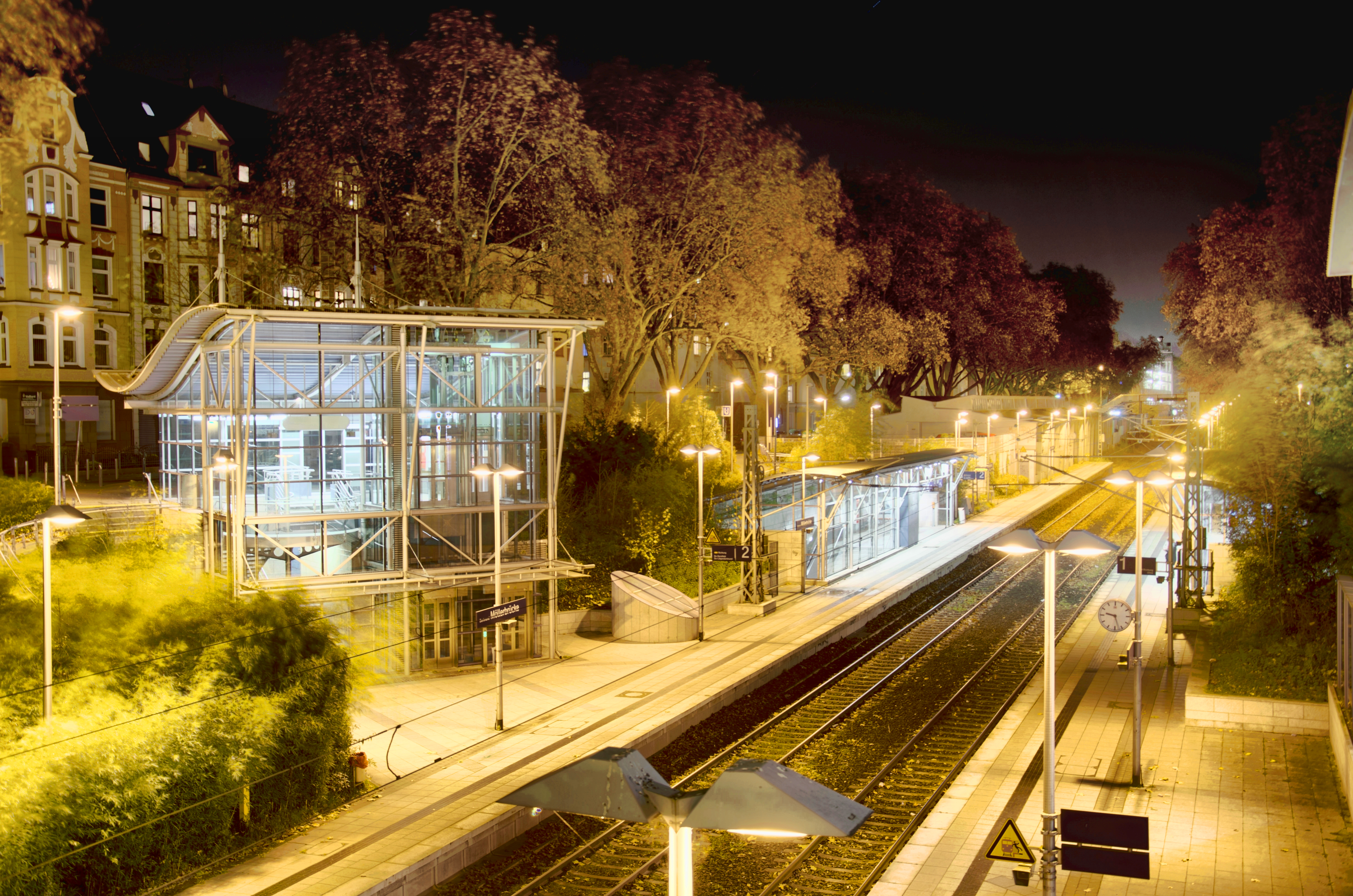
Interchange station Möllerbrücke

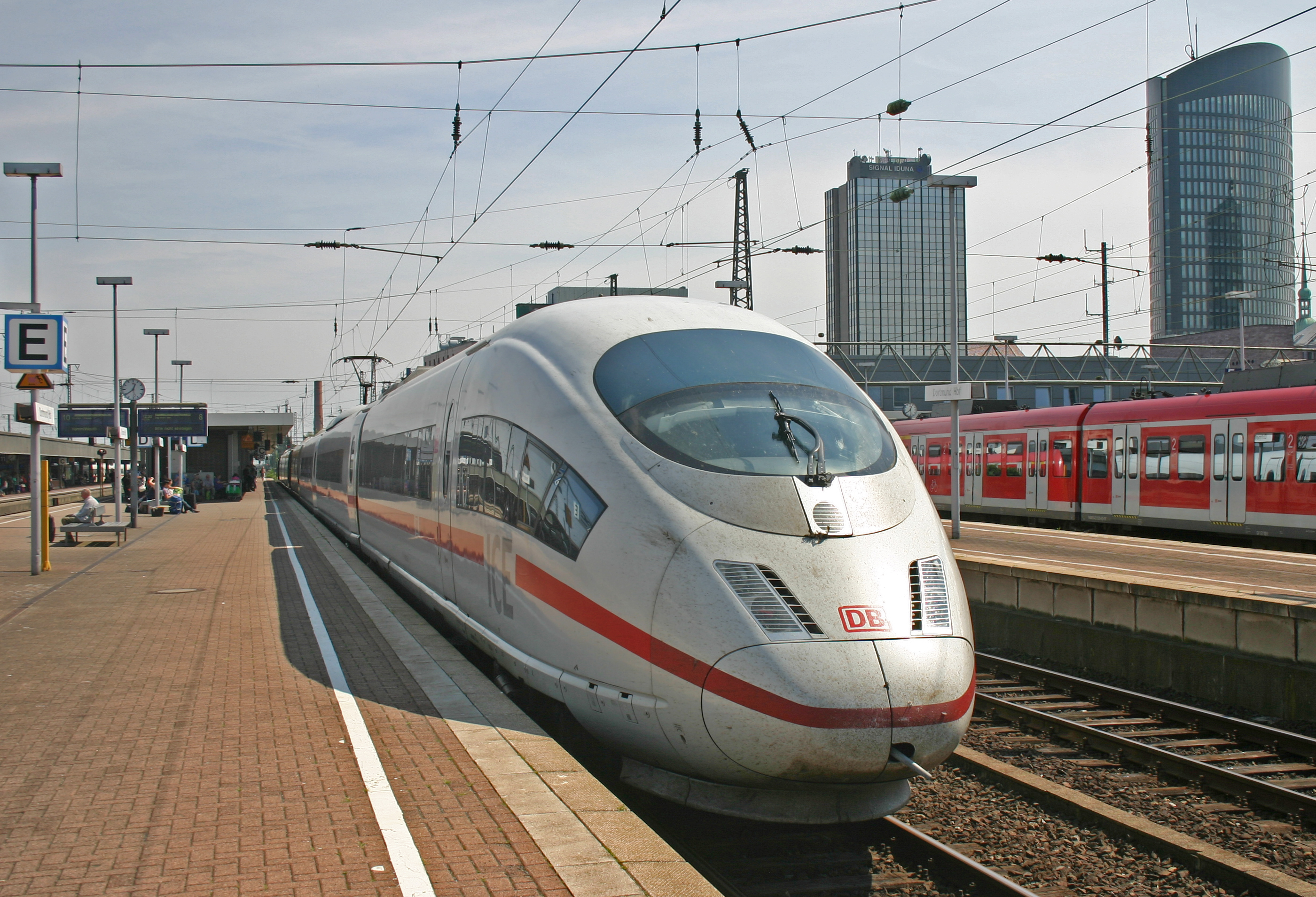
ICE 3 on the Dortmund Hauptbahnhof

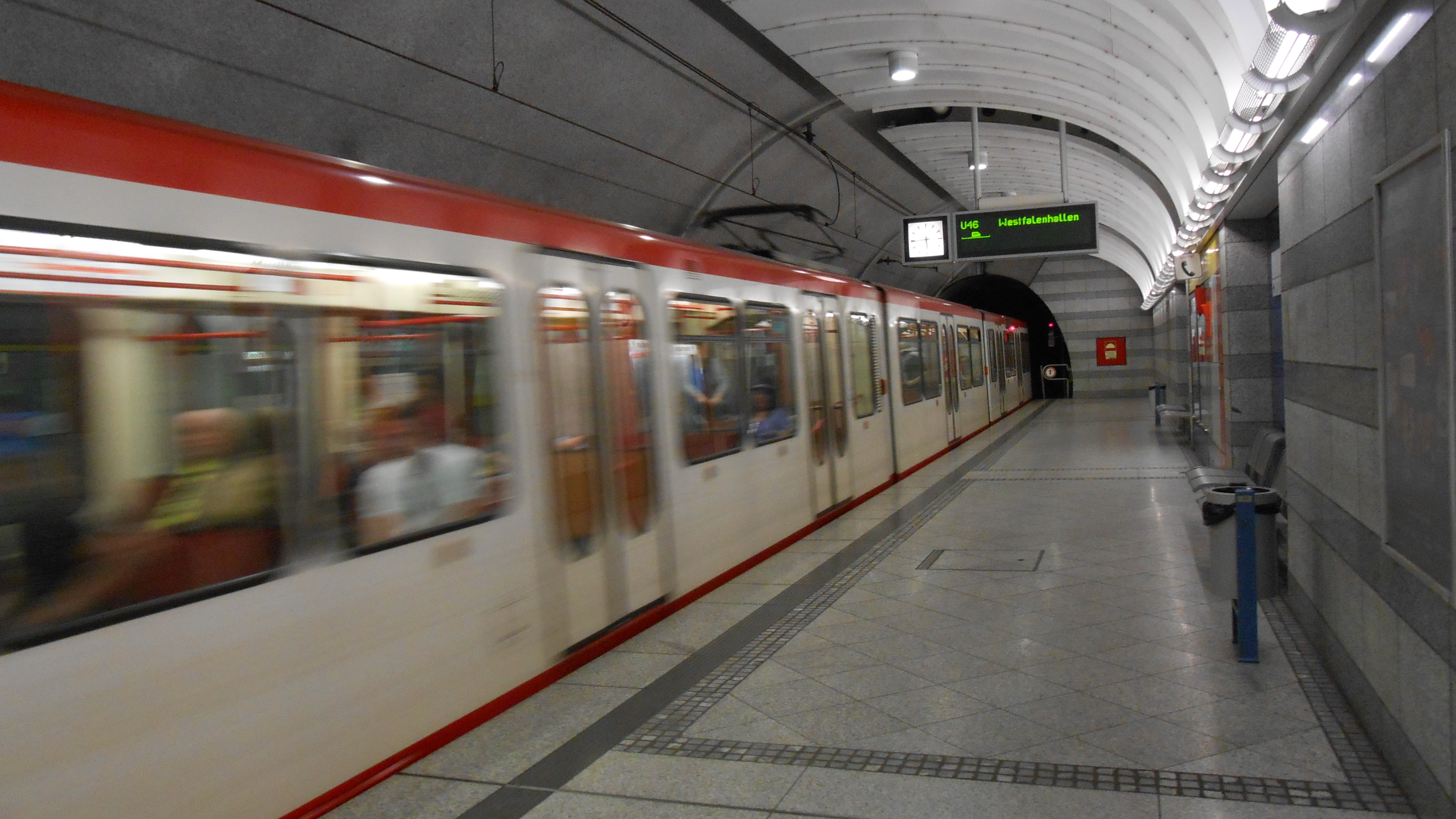
Stadtbahnwagen B Light Rail Vehicle

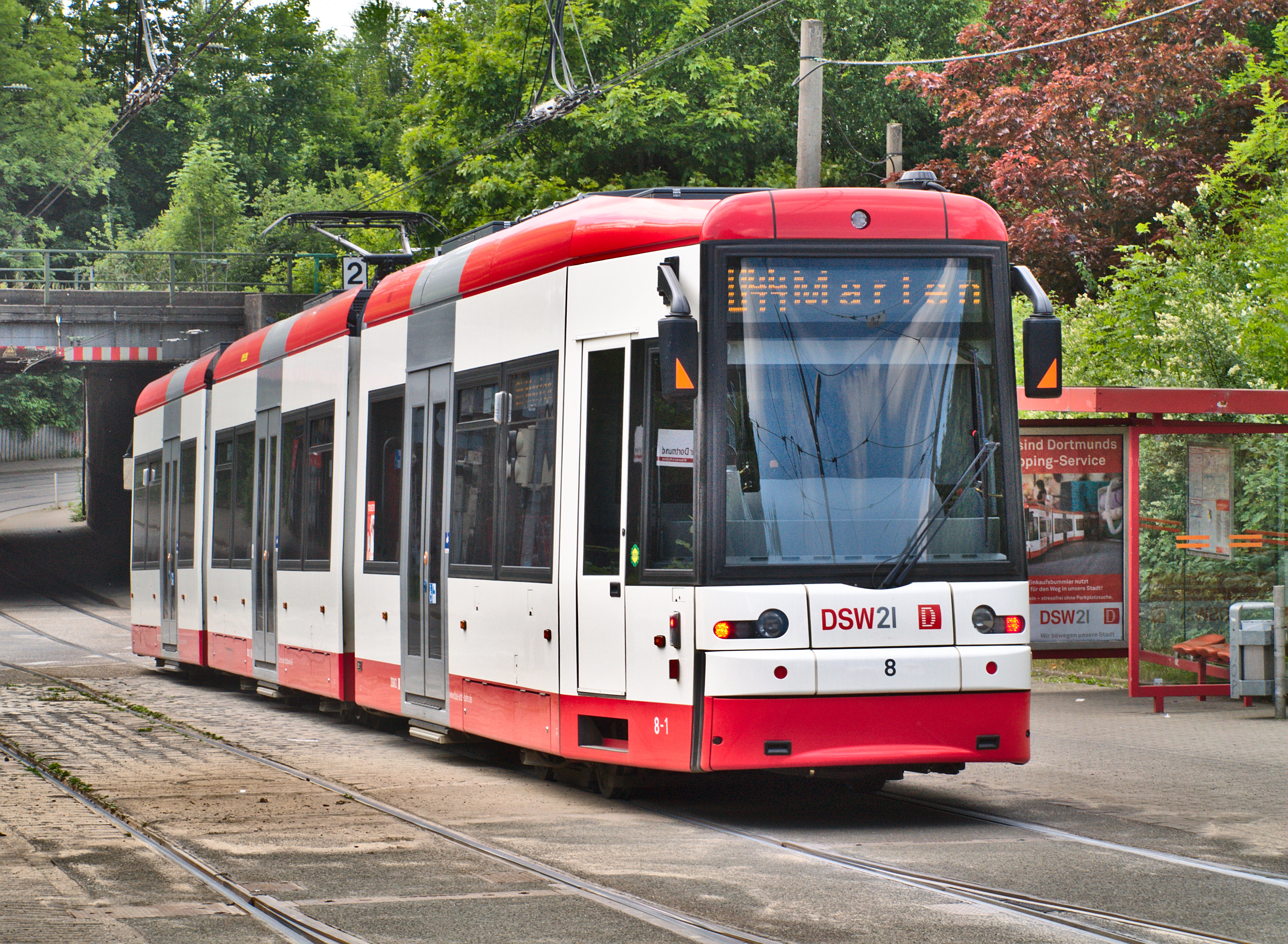
Bombardier Flexity Classic tram

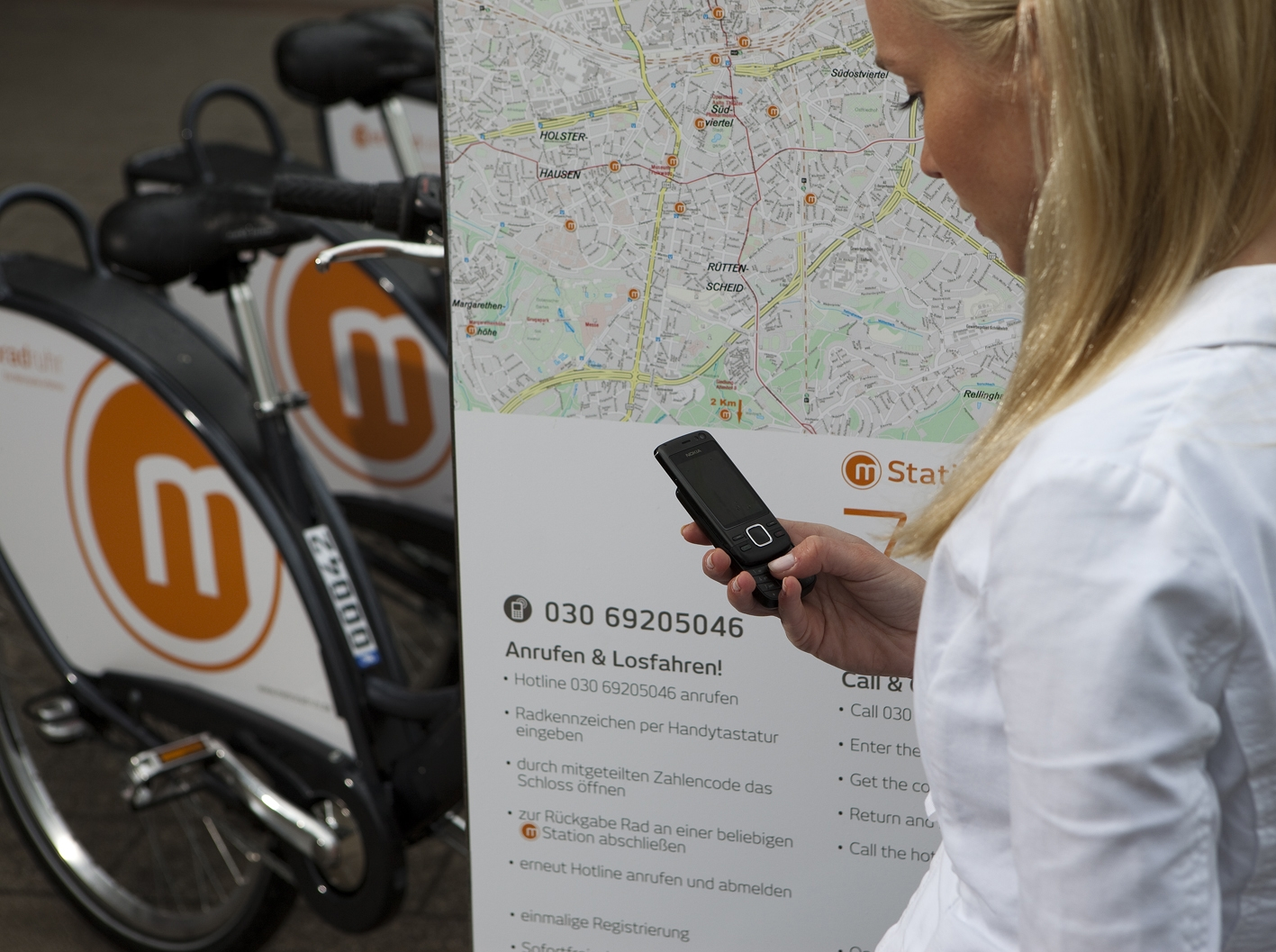
Metropolrad Ruhr, City Bike

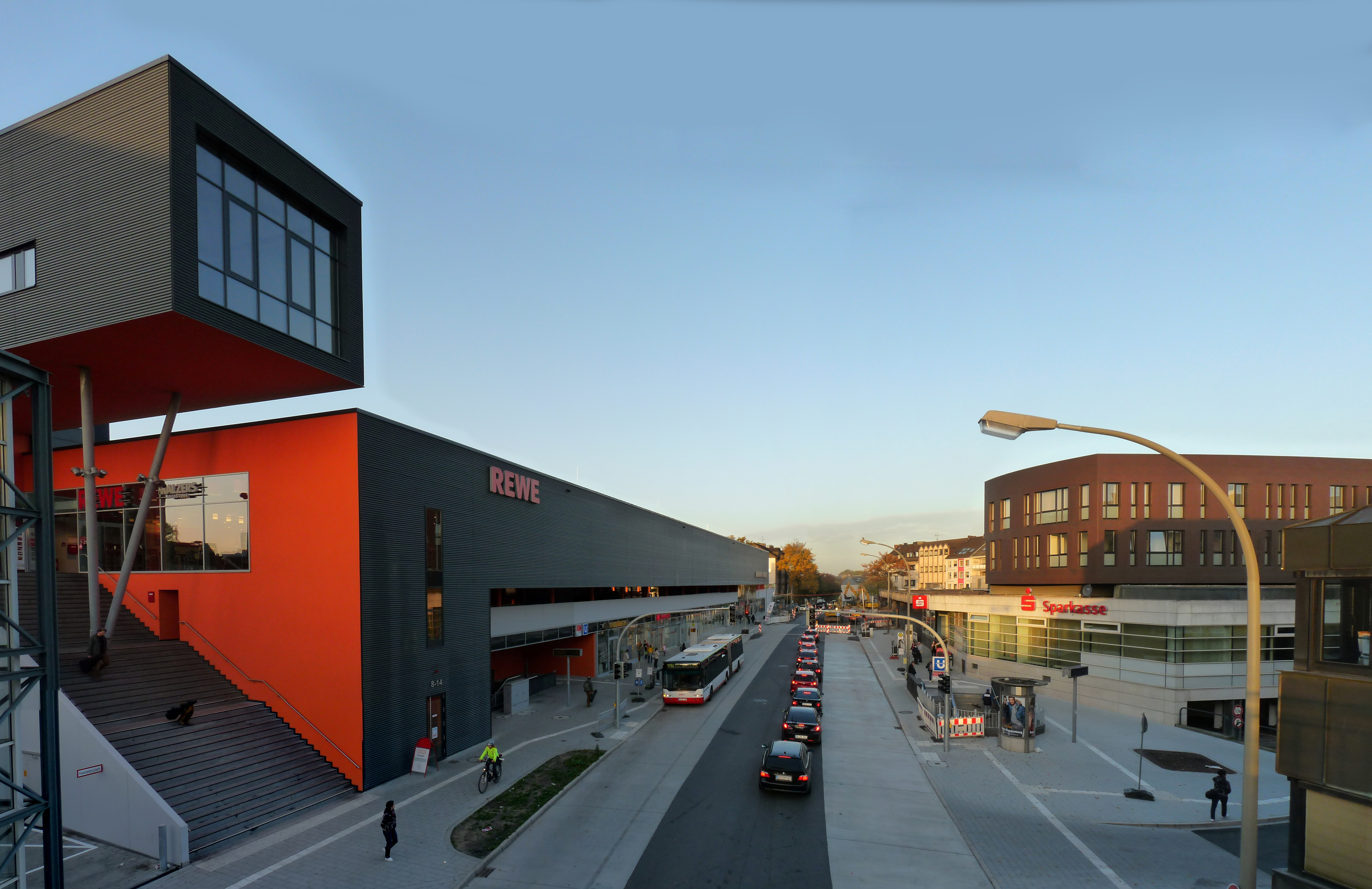
Hörde Bahnhof – second biggest in Dortmund

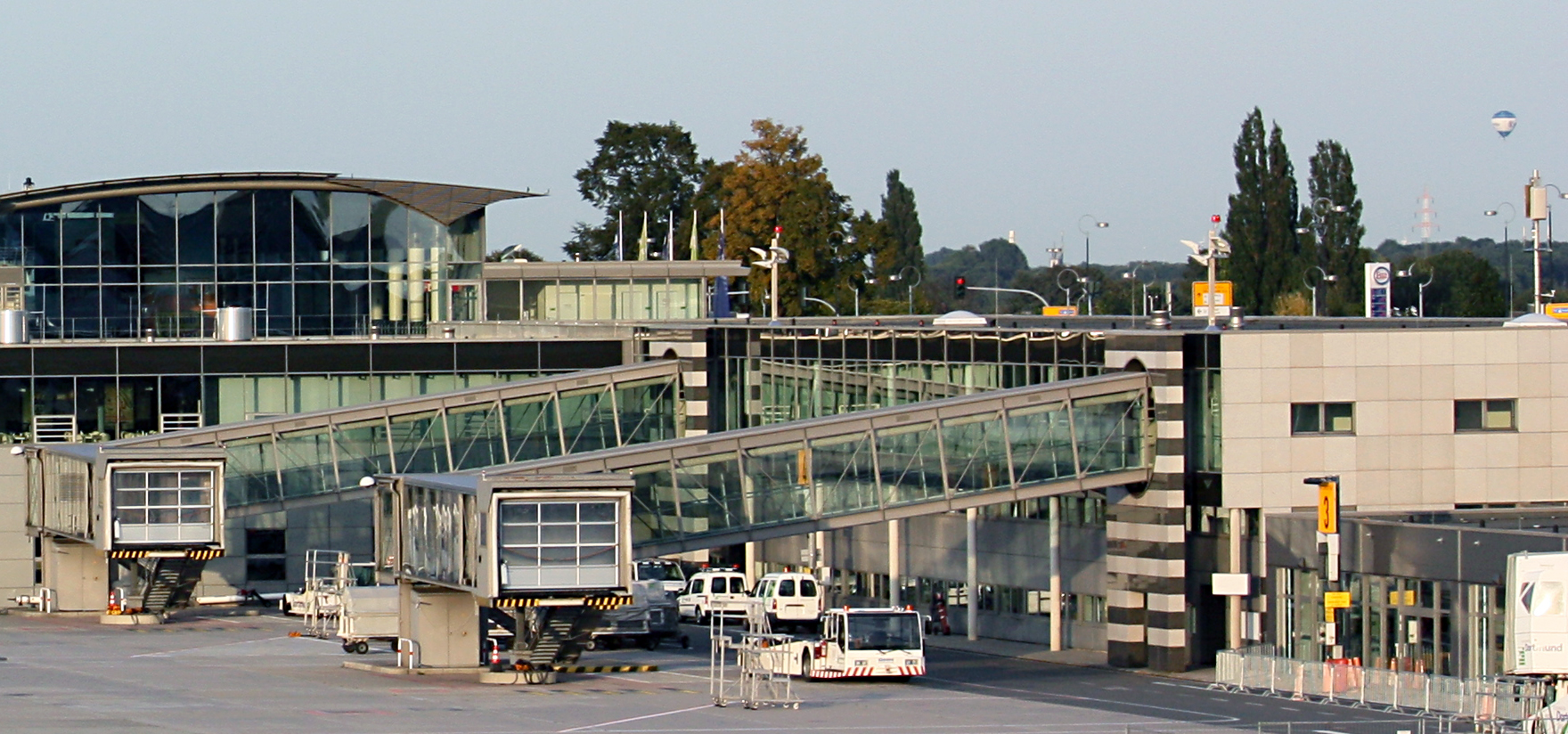
Dortmund Airport – Main Terminal (T2)

== Economy ==
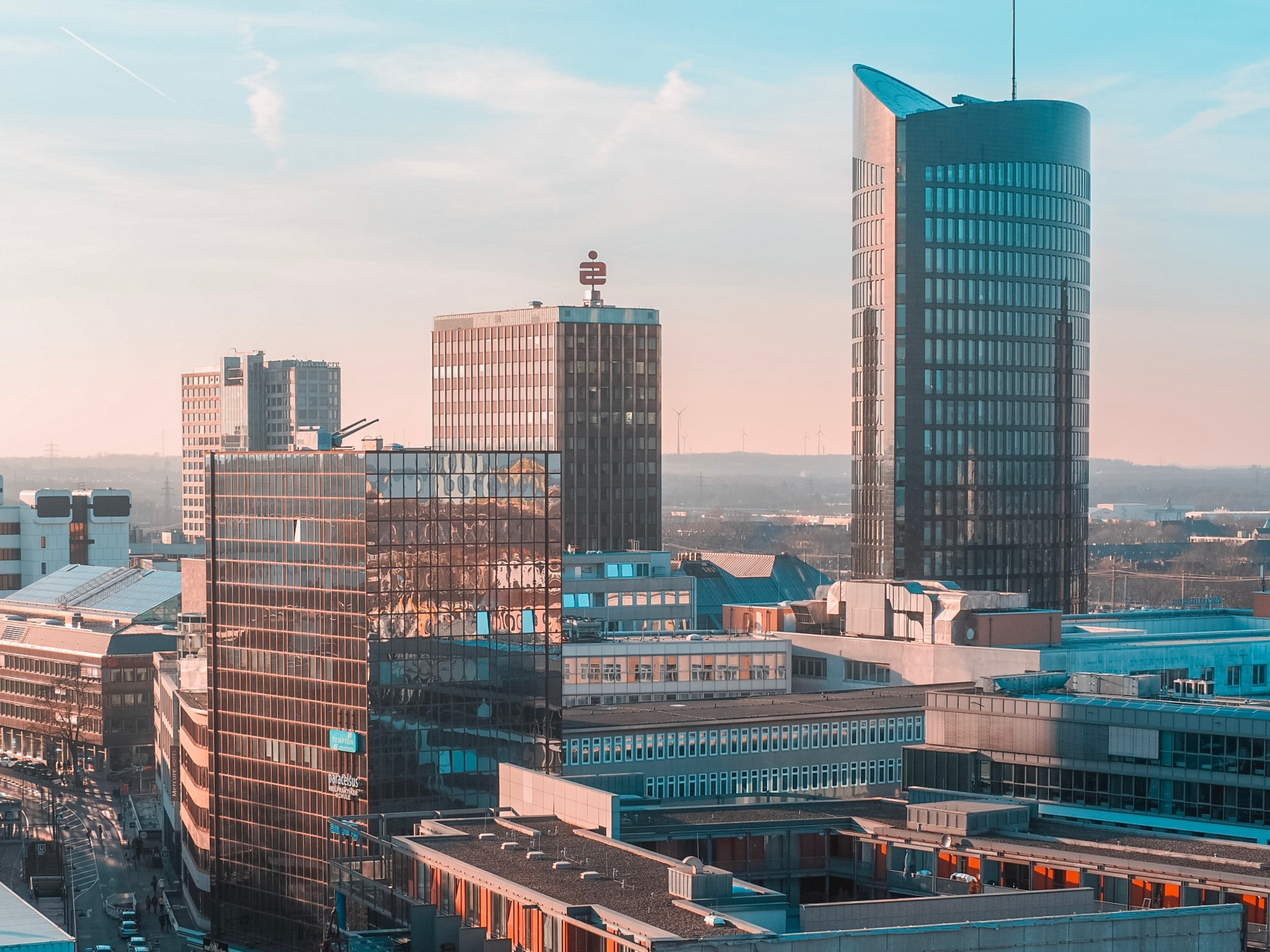
Central business district "Wallring"

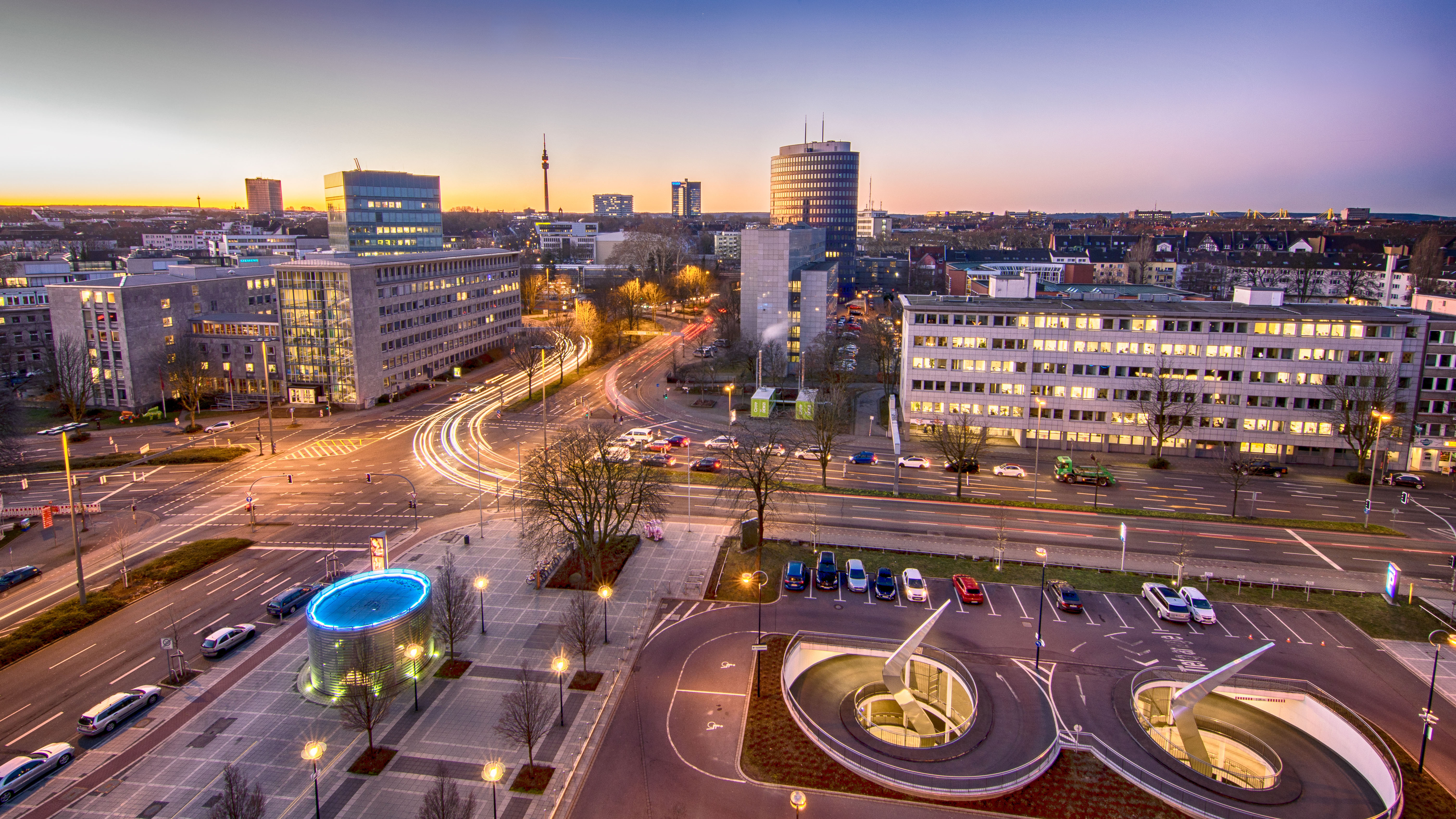
Central Business District "Ruhrallee"

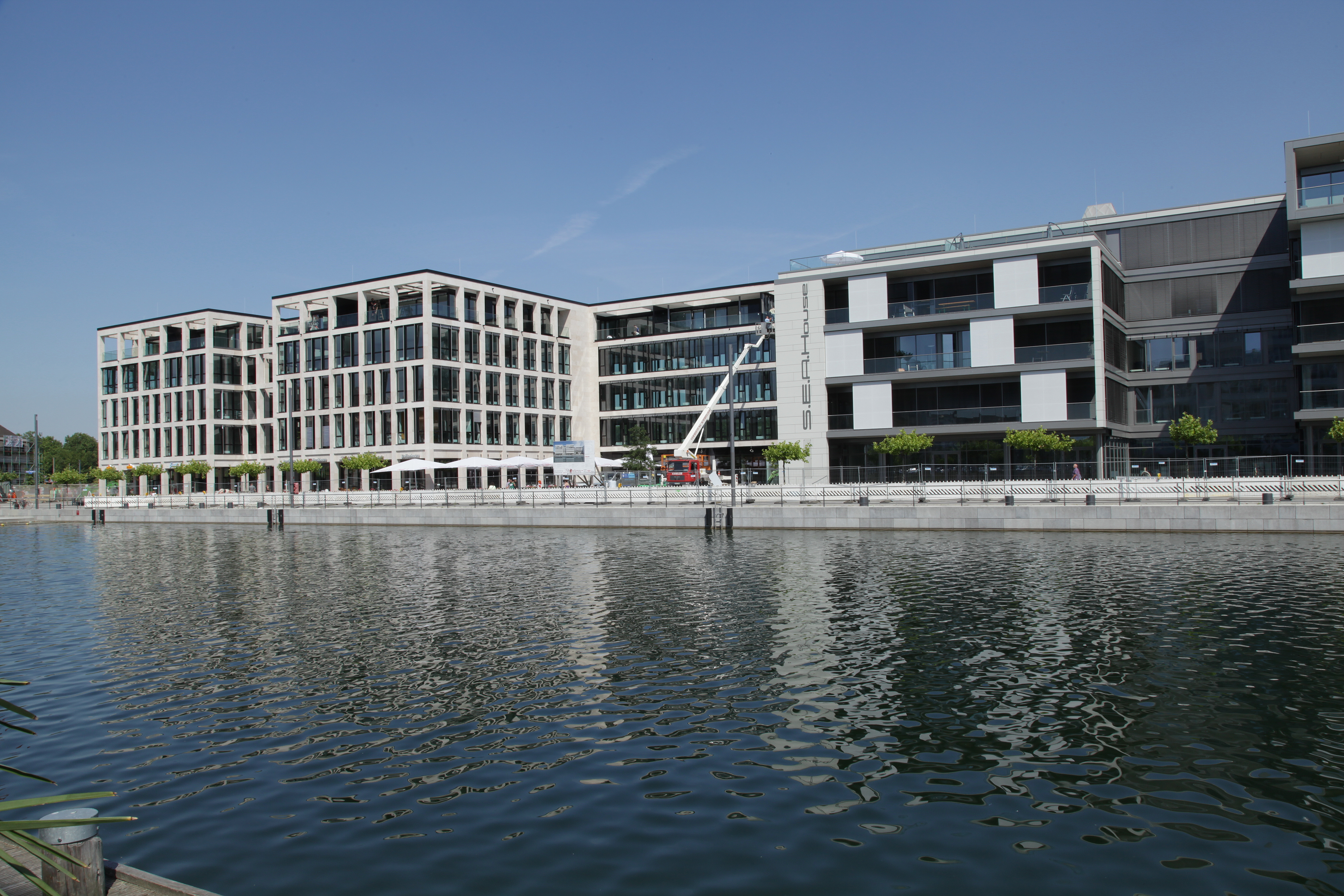
Future location Lake Phoenix and Phoenix-East

Dortmund has adapted since the collapse of its century long steel, coal and beer industries. The region has shifted to high technology, robotics, biomedical technology, micro systems technology, engineering, tourism, finance, education, and services, and is thus one of the most dynamic new-economy cities in Germany. In 2009, Dortmund was classified as a Node city in the Innovation Cities Index published by 2thinknow.

Hundreds of SMEs are still based in and around Dortmund (often termed Mittelstand). Dortmund is also home to a number of medium-sized information technology companies, many linked to the local university TU Dortmund at the first technology center in Germany named "Technologiepark Dortmund" opened in the 1980s. With around 280 companies, like Boehringer Ingelheim and Verizon Communications, and more than 8,500 employees, TechnologiePark Dortmund is one of the most successful technology parks in Europe. The city works closely with research institutes, private universities, and companies to collaborate on the commercialisation of science initiatives. Furthermore, 680 IT and software companies with 12,000 employees are based in Dortmund, making the city one of Germany's biggest software locations. Two of the top 10 IT service providers in Germany are based in Dortmund – adesso SE and Materna Group.

Dortmund is home to many insurance companies e.g. Signal Iduna, Continentale Krankenversicherung, Bundesinnungskrankenkasse Gesundheit (BIG direkt), and Volkswohl Bund. In recent years a service sector and high-tech industry have grown up. Some of its most prominent companies of these sectors include Amprion and RWE-Westnetz (Electricity), Rhenus Logistics (Logistics), Wilo, KHS GmbH, Elmos Semiconductor, ABP Induction Systems, Nordwest Handel AG – all of whom have their headquarters here. Companies with operations in or around Dortmund include Zalando, Daimler AG: EvoBus, RapidMiner, Gap Inc., and ThyssenKrupp.

Dortmund is also the headquarters of Century Media Records, a heavy metal record label with offices in the United States and London. In August 2015, Century Media was acquired by Sony Music for US$17 million.

=== Tourism ===
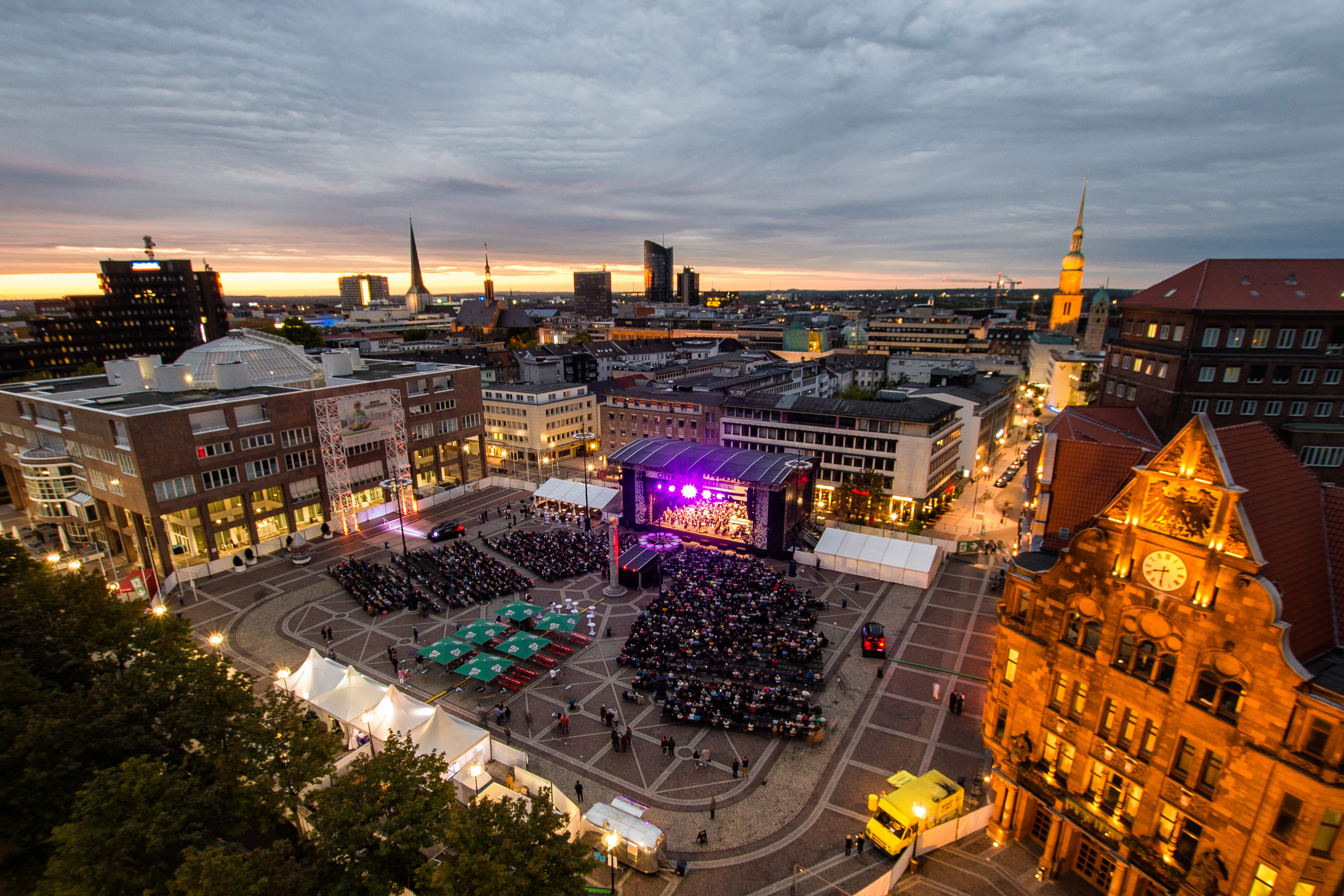
Cityring Concert, Freedom Square

Tourism in Dortmund is a fast-growing economic factor every year: new overnight records can be announced, new hotels open and new visitor magnets are added. Starting in the mid-1990s, Dortmund, formerly an industrial centre, saw rapid development that expanded its cultural and tourism, and transformed it into a vibrant city. An important strategic step was the start of construction the Konzerthaus Dortmund, the reuse of vacant industrial buildings like the Zollern II/IV Colliery, Kokerei Hansa, Dortmund U-Tower, and the reorientation of the Dortmund Christmas Market with over 300 stalls packed around a Christmas tree that stands 45 metres tall – reputed to be the biggest in the world. A Tourist Information centre next to the U-Tower. In 2017, Dortmund had 1,450,528 overnight stays; making it one of the most popular destinations in North Rhine-Westphalia.

The majority of tourists are domestic visitors, coming from Germany. International travellers arrive from the United Kingdom, Netherlands, Austria, and Switzerland. Dortmund also draws business tourism, having been equipped with facilities like WILO, Amprion next to Westfalenhallen and football tourism with Fans of Borussia Dortmund. The top 5 most visited attractions were the Christmas market, with more than three and a half million visitors, Signal Iduna Park, Deutsches Fußballmuseum, Dortmund U-Tower, Zollern II/IV Colliery, and Westfalenpark.

=== Shopping ===
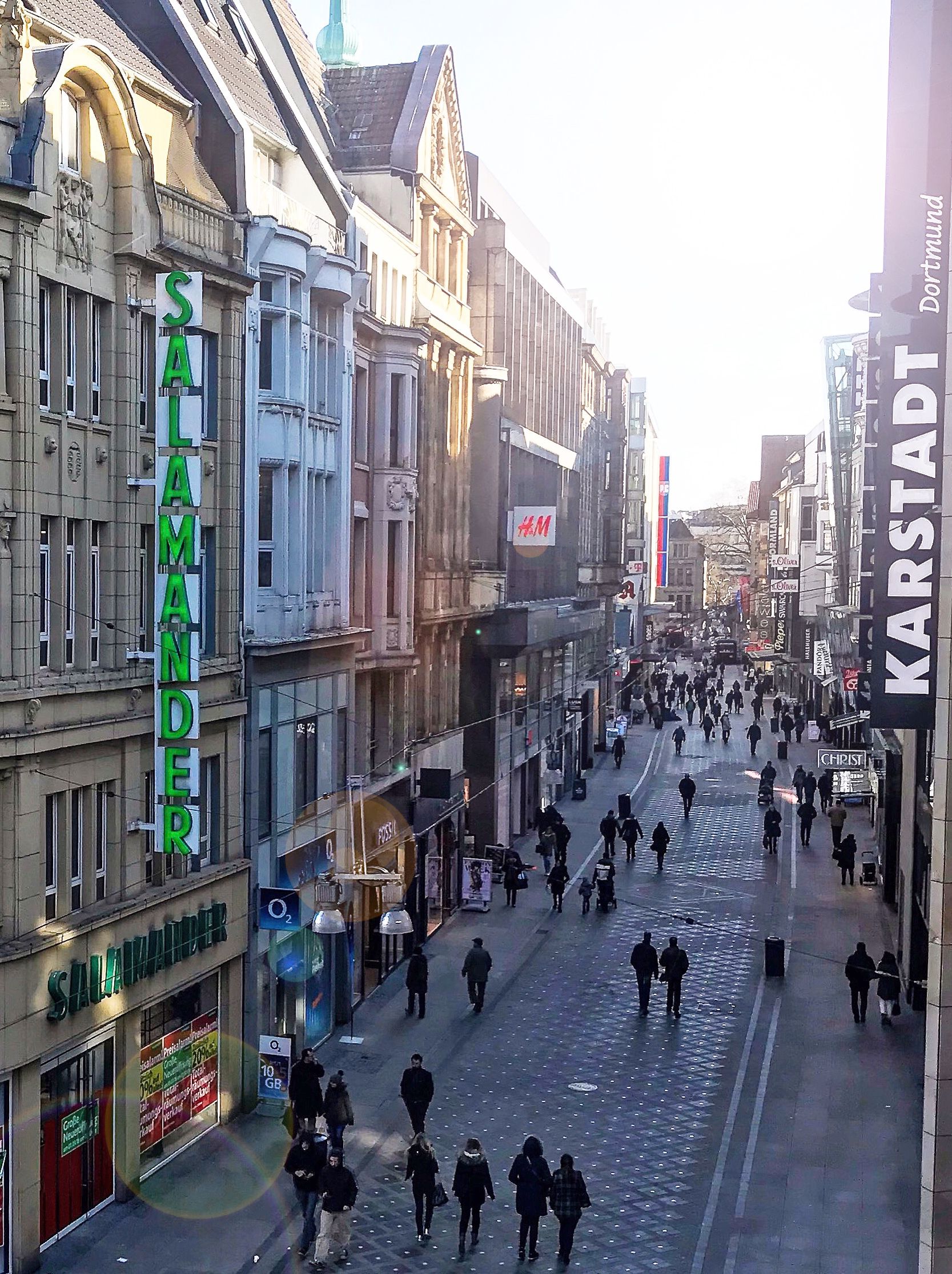
Westenhellweg

The Westenhellweg is a popular shopping destination and with nearly 13,000 visitors per hour it was Germany's most frequented shopping street in 2013. During the Middle Ages, Dortmund was the only free imperial city in Westphalia, having already been regarded as an important centre of trade. Today some of the most reputed shops, department stores have stores here. It is a pedestrian-only area and is bordered by the Reinoldikirche in the east and U-Tower in the west. The Westenhellweg has one of the highest rents for retail and office space in North Rhine-Westphalia.

Three more shopping malls occupy the Thier-Galerie; Galeria Kaufhof and Karstadt, as well as large fashion retail clothing stores. During the month before Christmas, the extended pedestrian-only zone is host to Dortmund Christmas Market, one of the largest and oldest Christmas markets in Germany. With more than 3.5 million visitors and 300 stalls around a gigantic Christmas tree that stands 45 metres tall, it is one of the most visited and popular market in the world.

In close proximity to the Dortmund concert hall lies the Brückstraßenviertel – a quarter hub especially for young people. The "Rue de Pommes Frites", which is what the Dortmund citizens have called the Brückstraße, has turned into a modern shopping promenade, geared towards a younger market.

For a long time, the Kampstraße had a shadowy existence as a parallel street to the Westenhellweg and Ostenhellweg, but it has become a grand boulevard containing specialist stores. Right next to the Kampstraße is the Kleppingstraße – a shopping street with a high concentration of gastronomy and expensive, prestigious shops. It is located between the Ostenhellweg and Neutor to Wallring.

=== Port and logistics ===
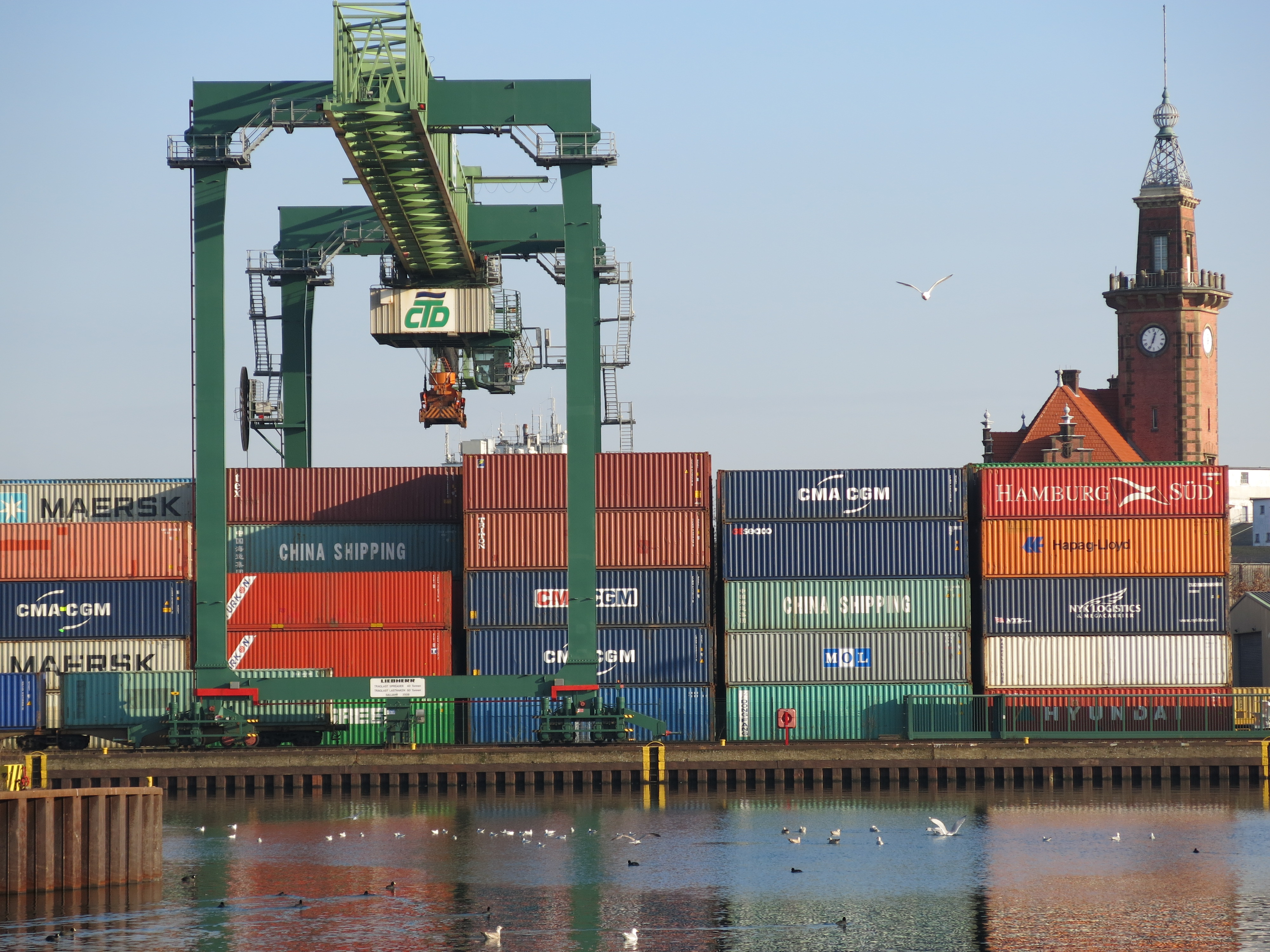
Logistic Hub Harbour

Dortmund is one of the most important logistic hubs in Germany, more than 900 companies working in logistics, as well as nationally and internationally recognised scientific institutes. Dortmund Port, which terminates the Dortmund-Ems Canal connecting Dortmund to the North Sea, is the biggest European canal port with 10 docks and a pier length of 11 km. The variety of different activities taking place at the Fraunhofer Institute Material Flow and Logistics (Fraunhofer Society) has, over the past few years, led to a bundling of skills in the areas of logistics and digitalisation in the city. Industry-based initiatives and pilot projects, such as the Hybrid Services in Logistics innovation lab, the efficiency cluster LogistikRuhr, Industrial Data Space, the Dortmund Mittelstand 4.0 Centre of Excellence, and the enterprise labs. The Digital Hub for Logistics of the Federal Ministry for Economic Affairs and Climate Action is based in Dortmund and twinned with Hamburg.

Companies with big logistic hubs for Germany and Europe in Dortmund include:

- Amazon
- IKEA
- Decathlon
- Rhenus Logistics
- Schenker AG
- TEDi GmbH & Co. KG

=== Fairs ===
Dortmund is home to Germany's twelve biggest exhibition centre, Halls of Westphalia which lies near the city center next to Dortmund Airport. With around 77.000 visitors each year, Jagd & Hund is by far the largest event held there. Other important fairs open to consumers include "Intermodelbau", the world's biggest consumer fair for model making, and one of the leading fairs for youth culture "YOU". Important fairs restricted to professionals include "D.I.M" (Deutsche Immobilienmesse, German property fair), Creativa (Hobby) and InterTabac (Tabaco).

Messe Dortmund logo

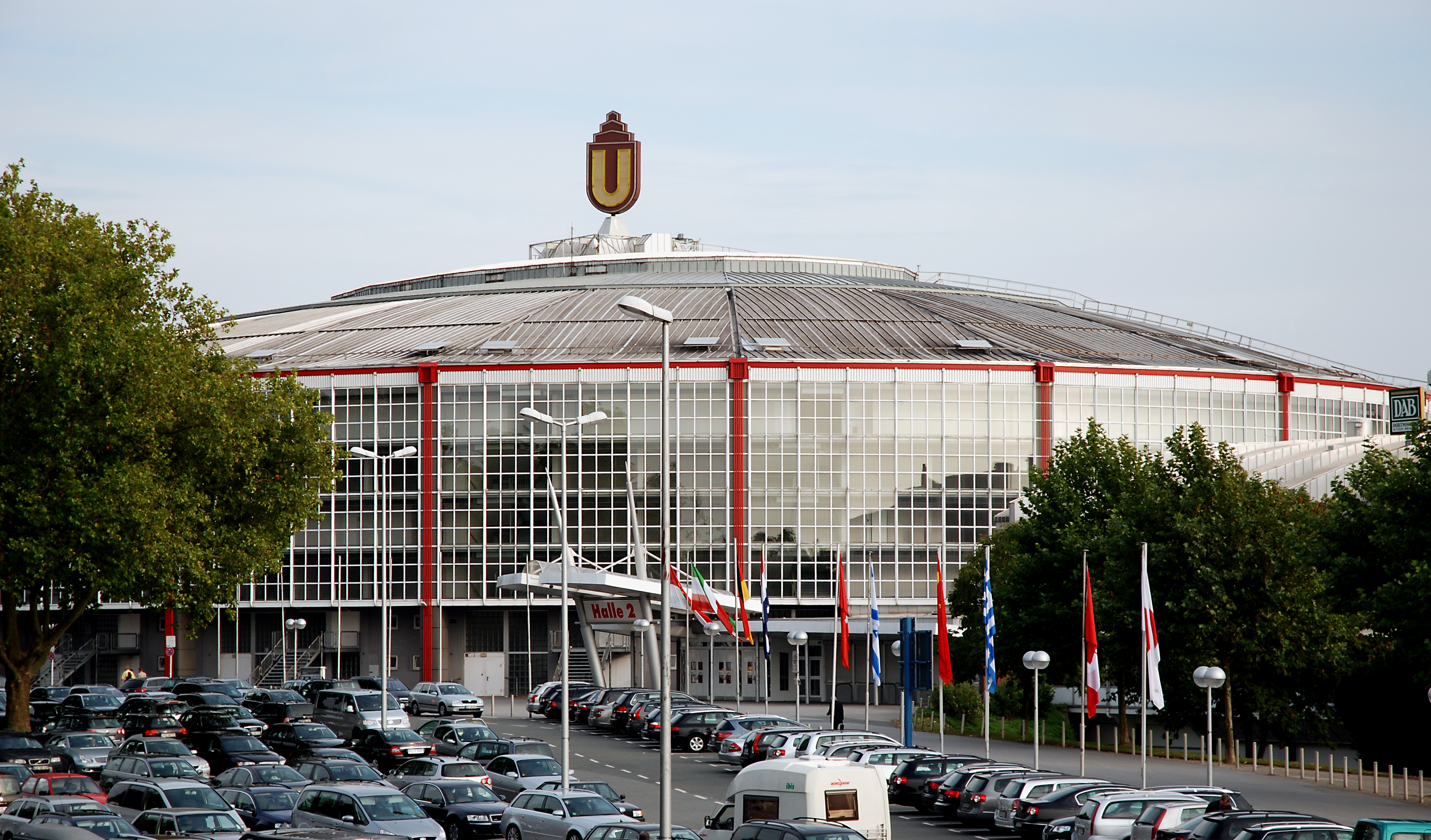
Main Hall

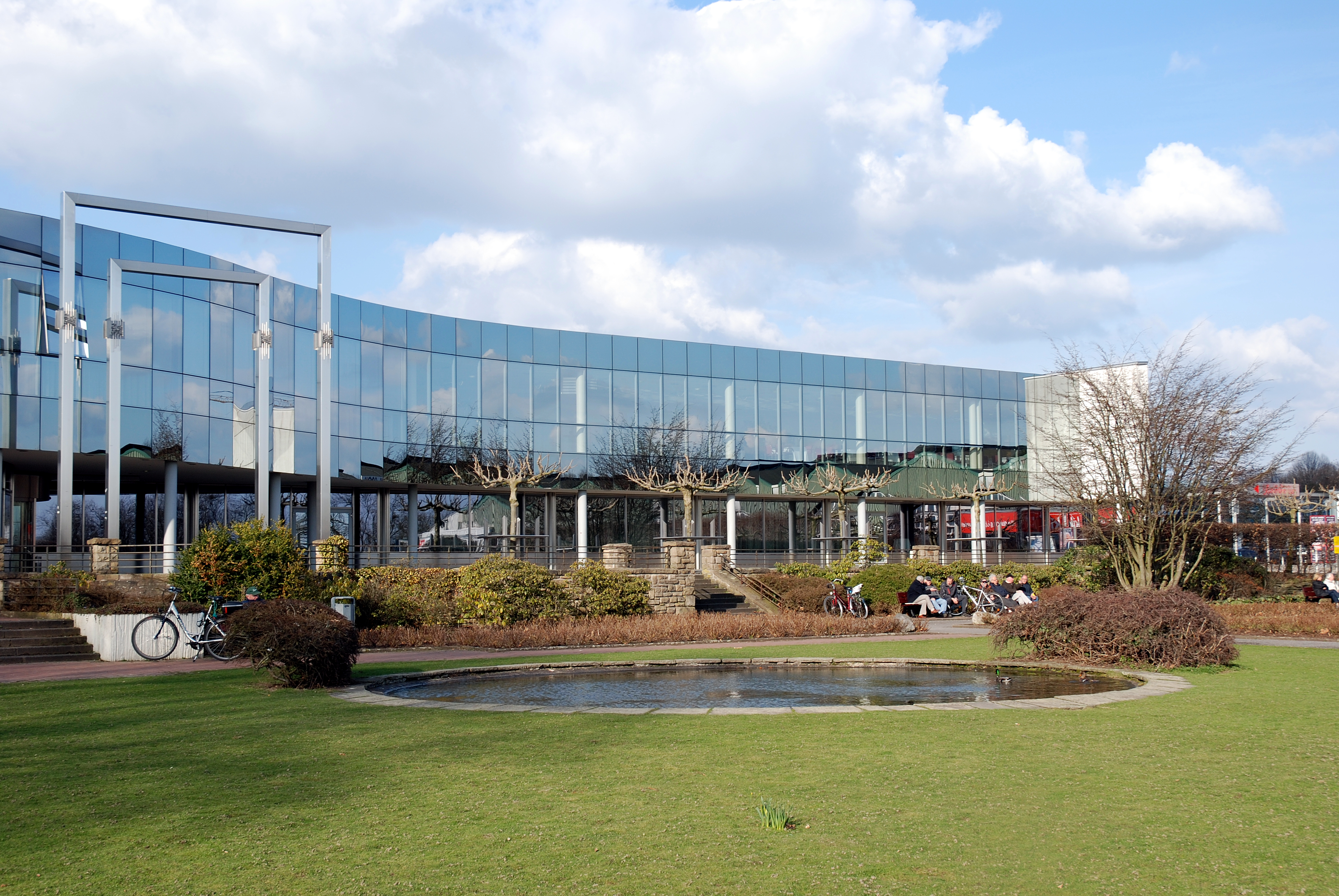
Rosenterassen south entrance

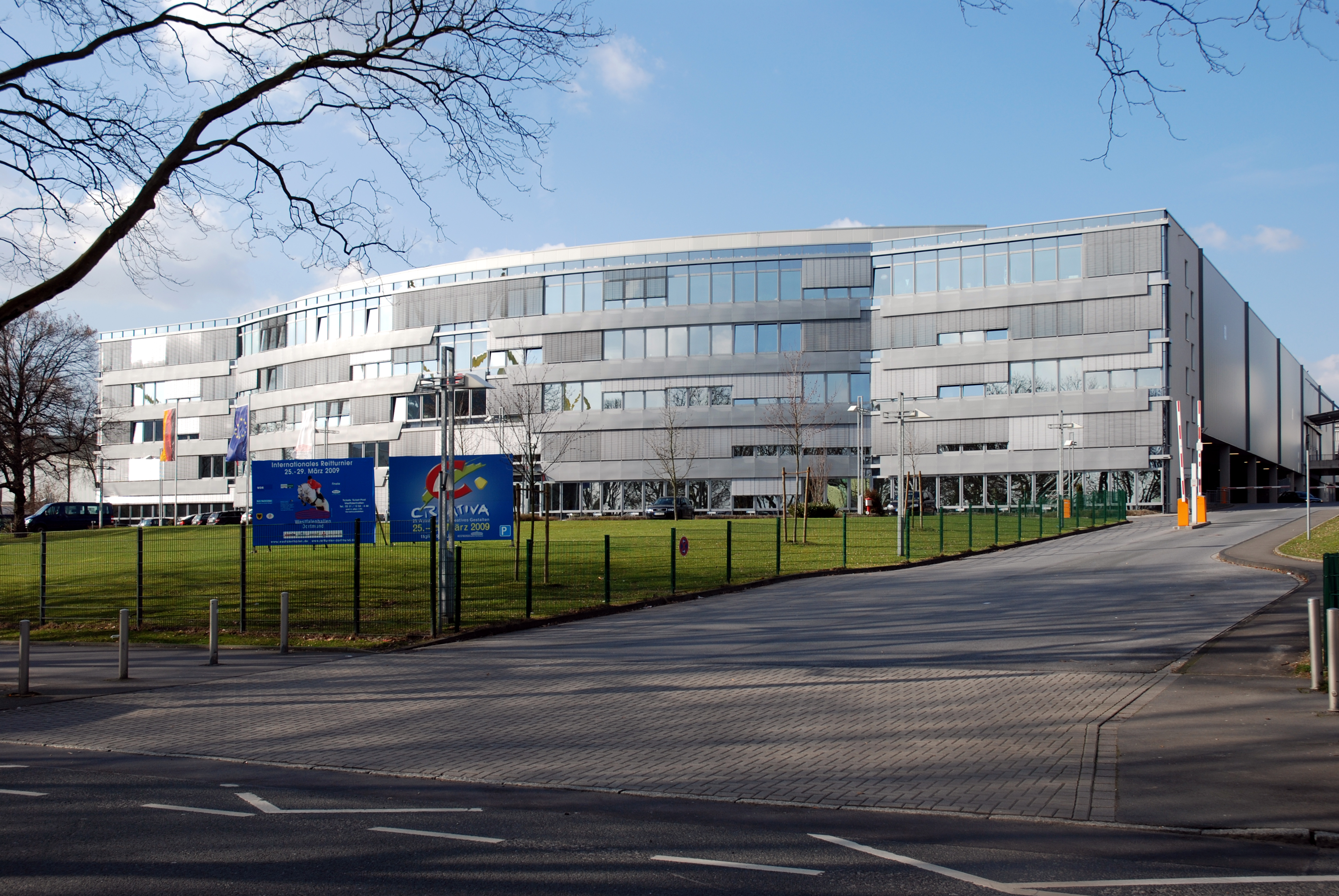
Headquarter

=== Federal Agency and public organisations ===
Dortmund is home of the Federal Institute for Occupational Safety and Health, the National Material Testing Office of North Rhine-Westphalia material and the main customs office.

=== Consulates ===
As an international city, Dortmund hosts consulates and consulates-general of Italy, Greece, Bangladesh, Ghana, South Africa, the Czech Republic, and Slovenia.

=== Courts ===
Several courts are located in Dortmund, including:

- Landgericht Dortmund (Regional Court Dortmund)
- Amtsgericht Dortmund (Local Court Dortmund)
- Sozialgericht Dortmund (Social Court Dortmund)
- Arbeitsgericht Dortmund (Employment Court Dortmund)

=== Newspapers ===
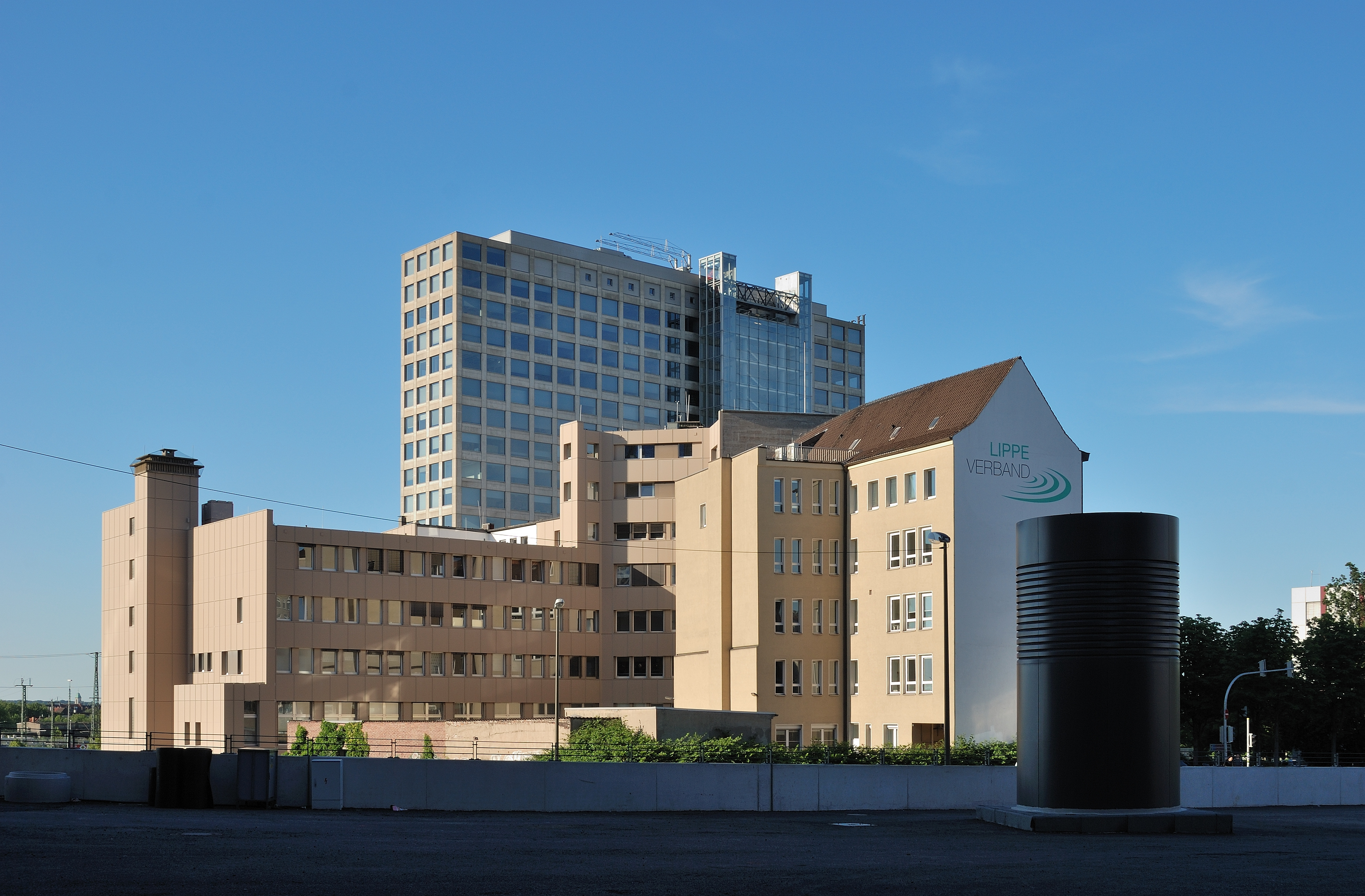
Harenberg City Center

Two important daily newspapers are published in and around Dortmund. The conservative Ruhr Nachrichten, also known as RN, was founded in 1949. The RN has a circulation of over 225,000 copies daily. The other important newspaper, the Westfälische Rundschau, was first published in 1945 and has a daily circulation of over 181,000. The WR is published by Germany's third largest newspaper and magazine publisher Funke Mediengruppe.

=== Magazines ===
Several magazines also originate from Dortmund. The Rock Rock hard (magazine) is a metal and hard rock magazine, with subsidiaries in various countries worldwide, including France, Spain, Brazil/Portugal, Italy, and Greece. Visions is a German music magazine with a circulation of approximately 35,000.

=== Radio and TV ===
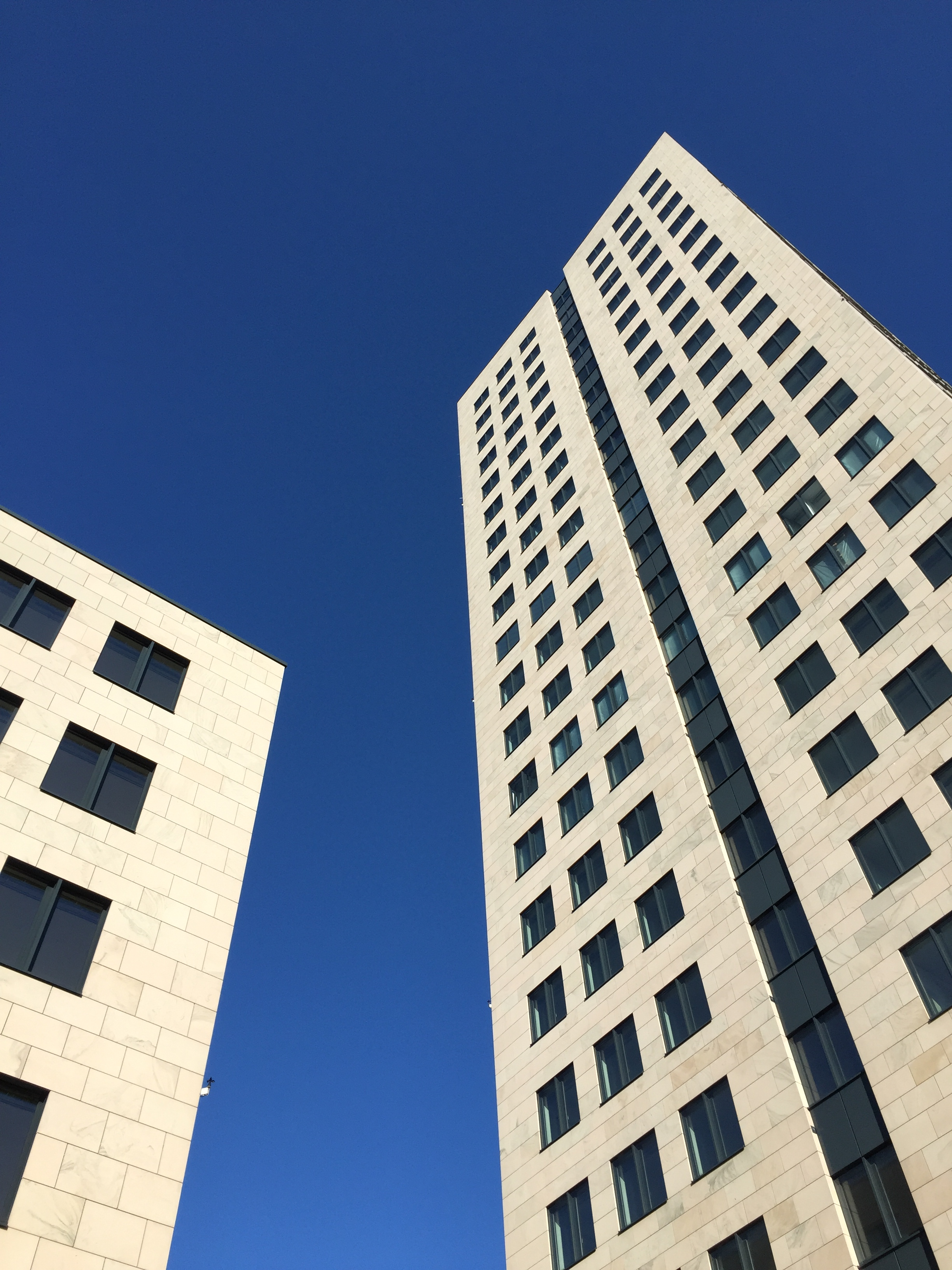
Westfalentower, regional studio of Sat.1

The Westdeutscher Rundfunk (WDR, West German Broadcasting Cologne has a sizable studio in Dortmund, which is responsible for the east Ruhr area. Each day, it produces a 30-minute regional evening news magazine (called Lokalzeit Ruhr), a 5-minute afternoon news programme, and several radio news programmes. A local broadcasting station called Radio 91.2 went "on-the-air" in the early 1990s. Sat.1 have a regional studio in Dortmund. The City stands alongside London and Paris as one of the three head offices of Global Tamil Vision and GTV-Deutschland.

Two big Radio Channels of Westdeutscher Rundfunk are sending from Dortmund.

- WDR 2, featuring adult-oriented popular music, focuses strongly on national and regional news, current affairs, and sport.
- WDR 4 (motto: Meine Lieblingshits, "my favourite hits") is a channel aimed chiefly towards an older audience. Its focus is on tuneful music – in particular, oldies and classic hits: popular music of the 1960s to the 1980s or later – with more specialized programming (operetta, country, folk) in the evenings. Around 30–40% of WDR 4's musical output is made up of German-language songs.

Other radio broadcasters include Radio NRW and eldoradio*.

=== Film ===
The films Trains'n'Roses, Bang Boom Bang, Oi! Warning, Do Fish Do It?, If It Don't Fit, Use a Bigger Hammer, Guys and Balls, Goldene Zeiten, Marija and television series Tatort, Balko, Helden der Kreisklasse, and more German movies like The Crocodiles, The Rhino and the Dragonfly, Ein Schnitzel für alle, Young Light, and Radio Heimat were filmed in the city.

== Education ==
Dortmund has 160 schools and 17 business, technical colleges teach more than 85,000 pupils. The city has a 4-year primary education program. After completing primary school, students continue to the Hauptschule, Realschule, Gesamtschule or Gymnasium (college preparatory school). The Stadtgymnasium Dortmund which was founded in 1543 as Archigymnasium is one of the oldest schools in Europe. The Leibniz Gymnasium, a bilingual public school located in the Kreuzviertel district, is particularly popular with children of the English-speaking expatriate community. The school is an International Baccalaureate school. The Goethe-Gymnasium was founded in 1867 as the first school offering higher education to girls in the city. It has been a NRW Sportschule, focused on sports, from 2009.

=== Higher education ===
TU Dortmund (Technical University of Dortmund) was founded in 1968 and is located in the southern part of the city. It has about 30,000 students and offers a wide range of subjects in of physics, electrical engineering, chemistry, spatial planning, and economics. The university has a dedicated railway station at the campus's main gate, the journey from the city centre lasting merely seven minutes. The university is highly ranked in terms of its research performance in the areas of physics, electrical engineering, chemistry, and economics. The university's most noticeable landmark is the H-Bahn, a monorail train which connects the north and south campuses.

Dortmund University of Applied Sciences and Arts is a Fachhochschule with 12,300 students, and 669 staff, 232 of which are professors. The Fachhochschule was created by a merger of several institutions of higher learning in 1971. Owing to its history as separate institutions, it consists of three campuses in different parts of Dortmund. The departments of mechanical and electrical engineering are located at Sonnenstraße near the city center. The department of design has its own campus at Max-Ophüls-Platz while the departments of social work, economics, computer science and architecture are housed in several buildings next to the Technical University of Dortmund campus in the suburb of Eichlinghofen. Additional offices in the city centre are used for administrative purposes.

The city is the site of several other universities, colleges and academies, which attract about 45,000 students. Among them there are:

- FOM Hochschule für Oekonomie & Management, Standort Dortmund: academy for management, founded in 1993.
- Fachhochschule für öffentliche Verwaltung Nordrhein-Westfalen: academy for public administration.
- International School of Management: private academy focussing on management and economics, founded in 1990.
- IT-Center Dortmund: private college founded in 2000.
- International University of Applied Sciences Bad Honnef – Bonn: is a private, state-recognised university of business and management.
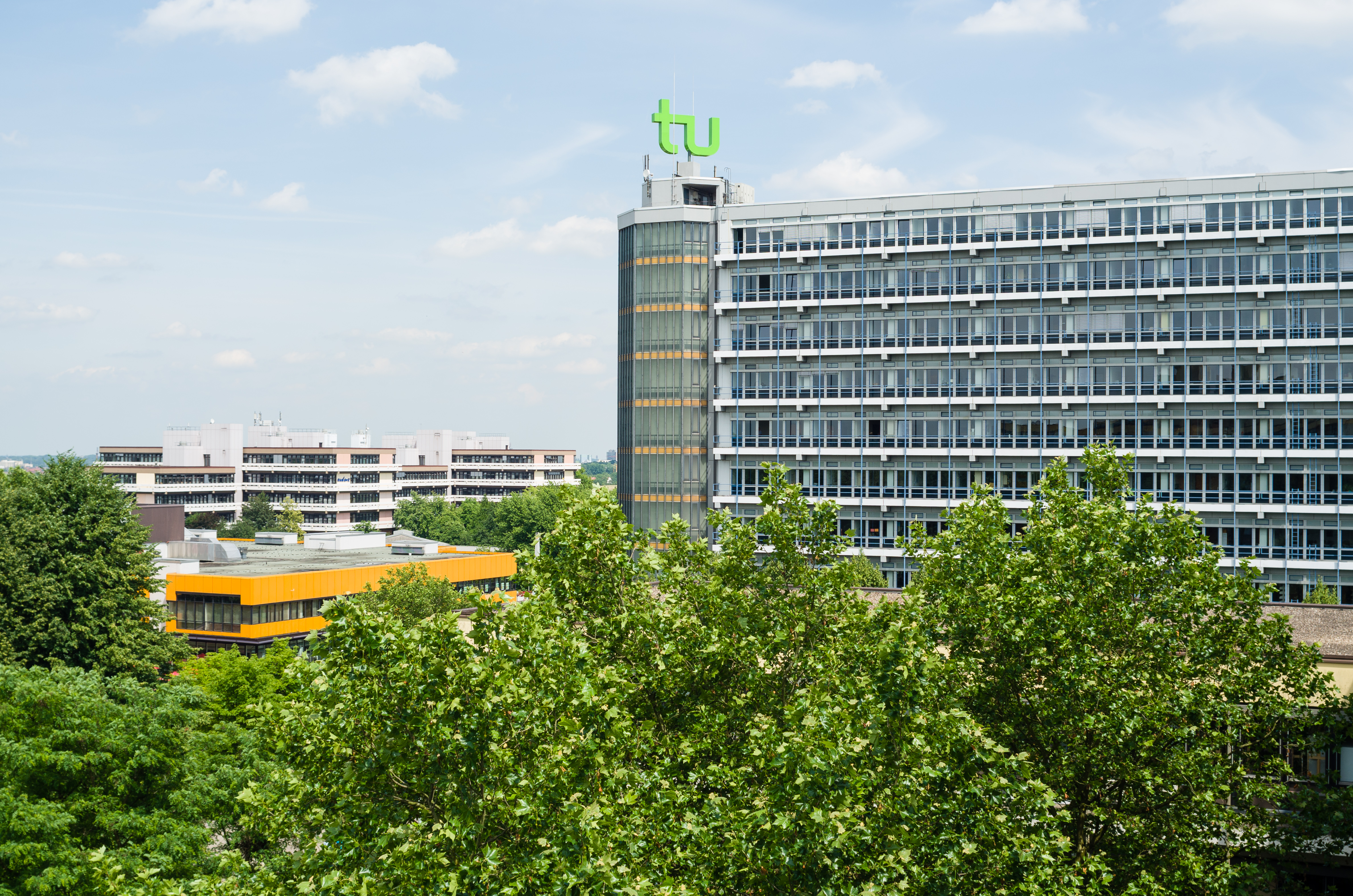
TU Dortmund

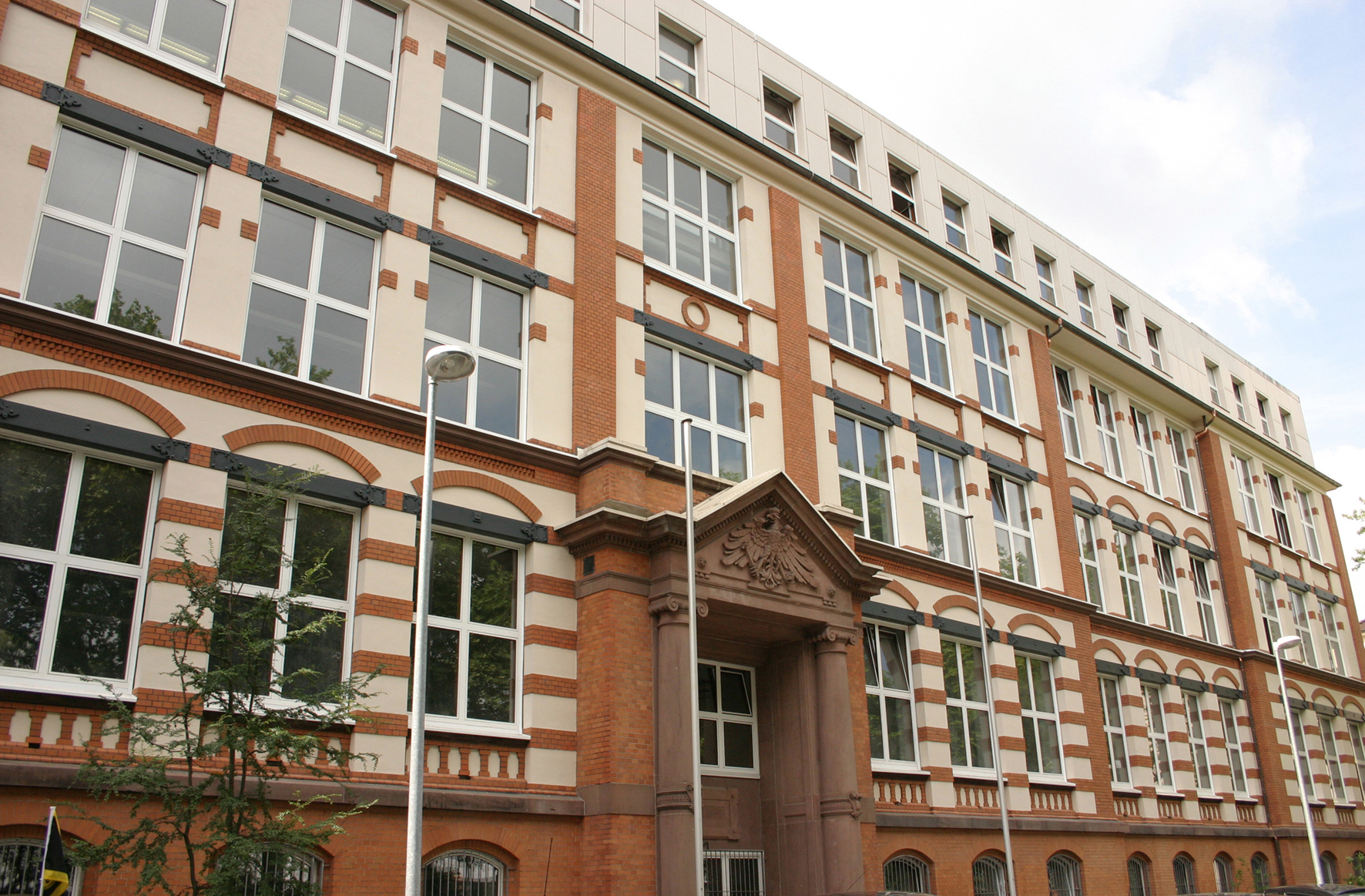
Dortmund University of Applied Sciences and Arts

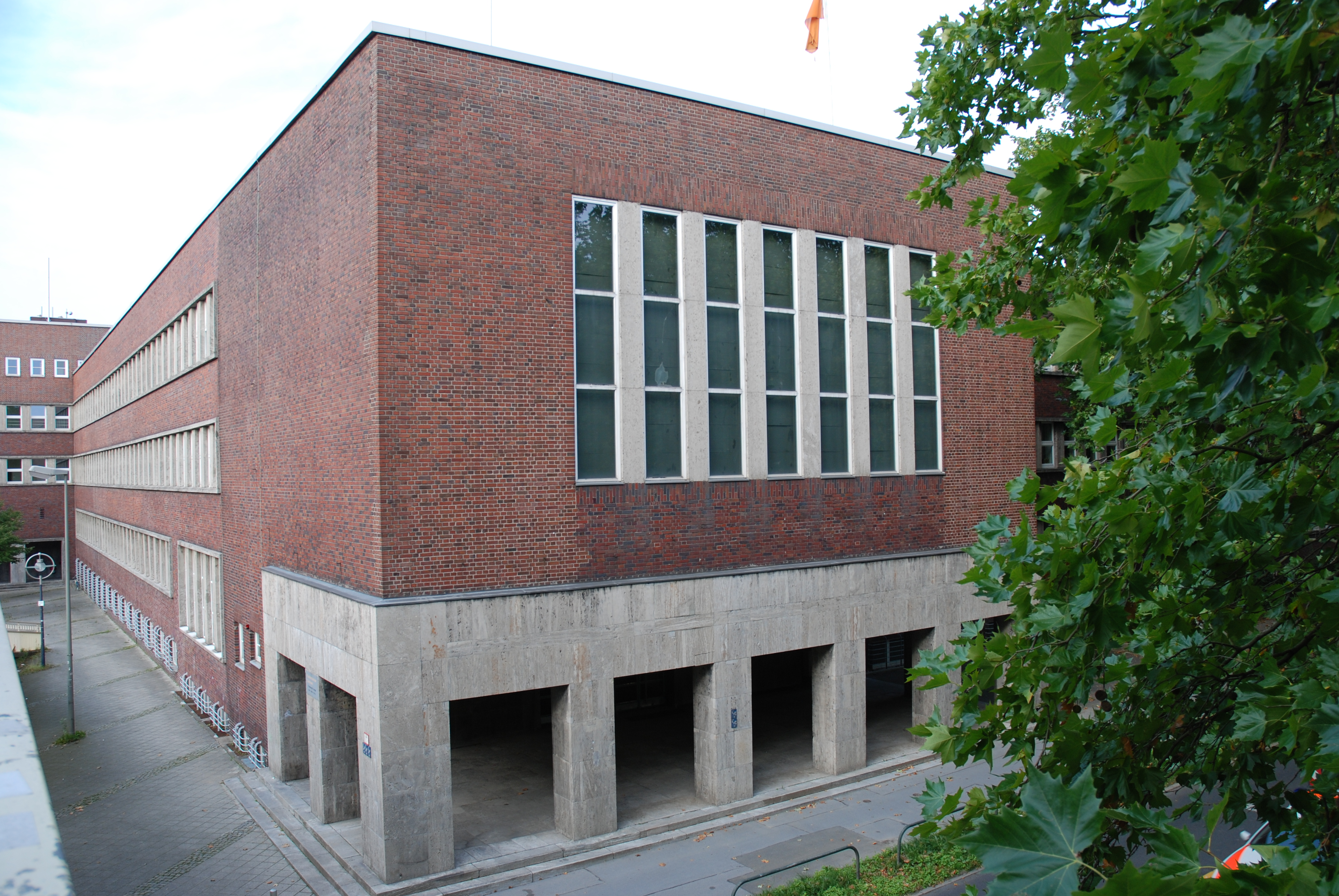
Department of at Design Max-Ophüls-Platz

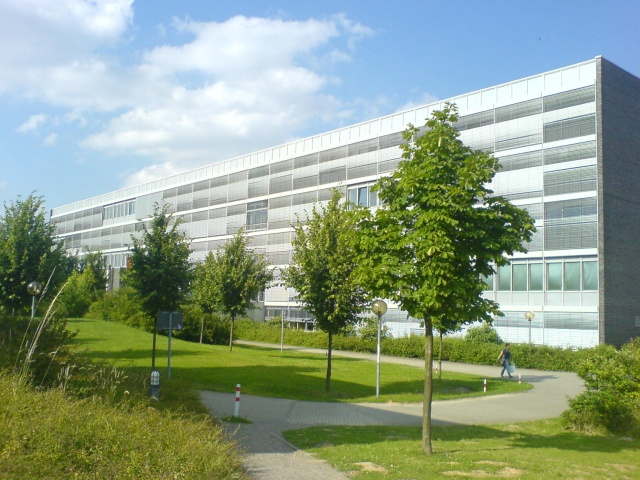
Department of Architecture

=== Research ===
The city has a high density of internationally renowned research institutions, such as the Fraunhofer Society, the Leibniz Association, and the Max Planck Society, which are independent of, or only loosely connected to its universities.

== Livability and quality of life ==
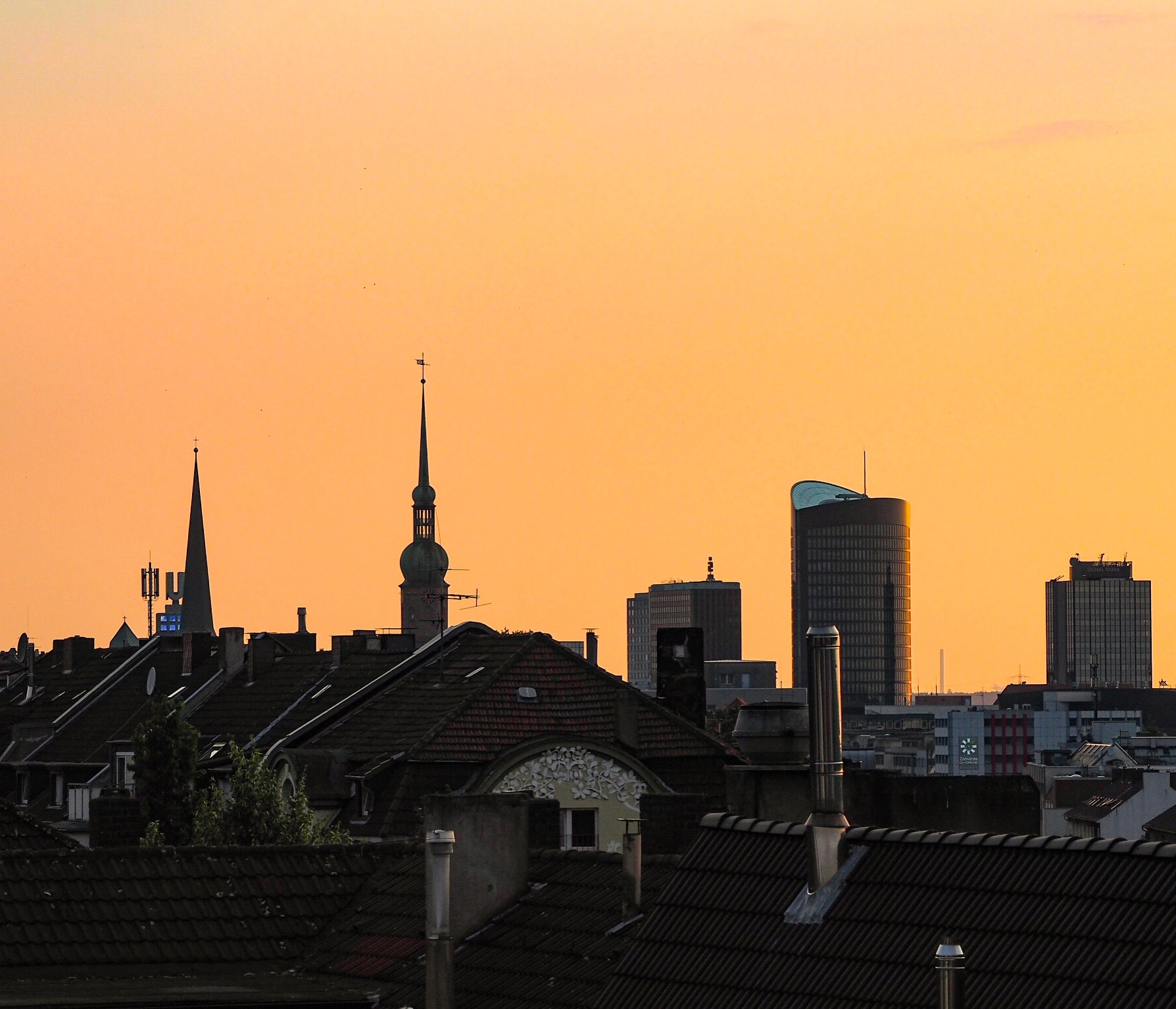
Dortmund is one of the least stressful cities in the world.

In November 2017, according to a study by data of the German National Statistics Office, the National Employment Agency, Mercer, Handelsblatt, Numbeo, and Immowelt, Dortmund was ranked on position seven of the most livable cities in Germany for expats. In September 2017, The New York Times praised the city of Dortmund, which has been adapting since the collapse of its century-old steel and coal industries and has shifted to high technology biomedical technology, micro systems technology and other services, as the hidden star of structural change providing a good quality of life for employees. According to the 2017 Global Least & Most Stressful Cities Ranking, Dortmund is one of the least stressful cities in the world. It is ranked 27th out of 150, between Copenhagen and Vancouver, and is highly ranked in the categories traffic & public transport, gender equality and debt per capital.

Like a Phoenix Rising from the Ashes and exemplary for structural transformation – This was the title of an article in the online version on Neue Zürcher Zeitung of the urban livability and new exceptional architecture in Dortmund.

In a 2015/2016 survey centred on student life in Germany, Dortmund ranked as seventh-best.

In a 2012 study of the most livable biggest cities in Germany, Dortmund ranked on position ten between Nuremberg and Stuttgart and first of all large cities in Germany due to sport, gastronomy, and shopping opportunities.

In 2009, Dortmund was classified as a Node city in the Innovation Cities Index published by 2thinknow, and in 2014 acclaimed as the most sustainable city in Germany.

== Culture ==
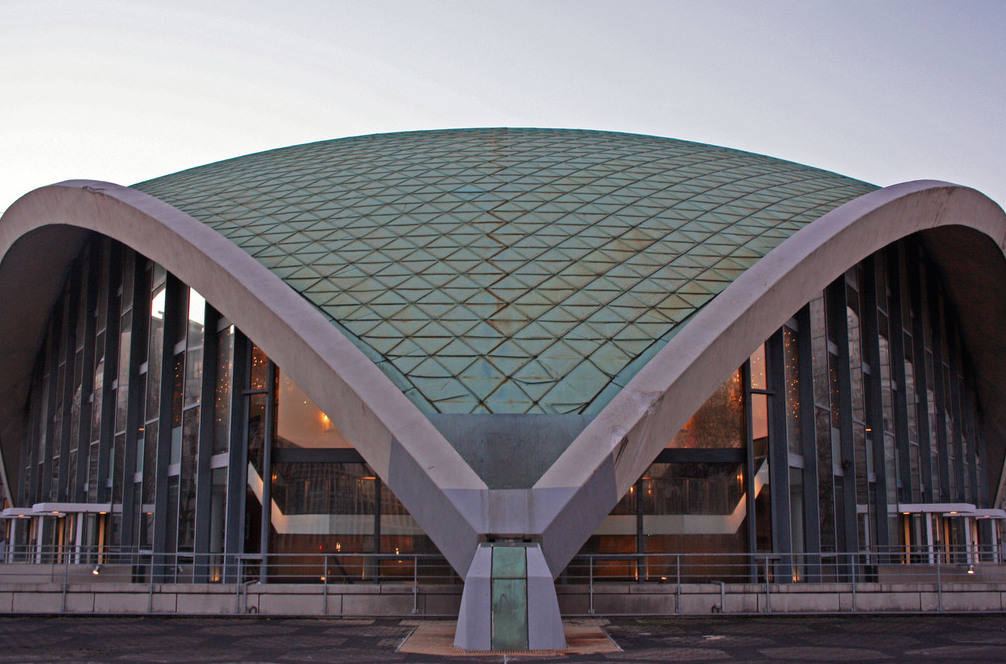
The new opera house is one of the biggest theaters in Germany.

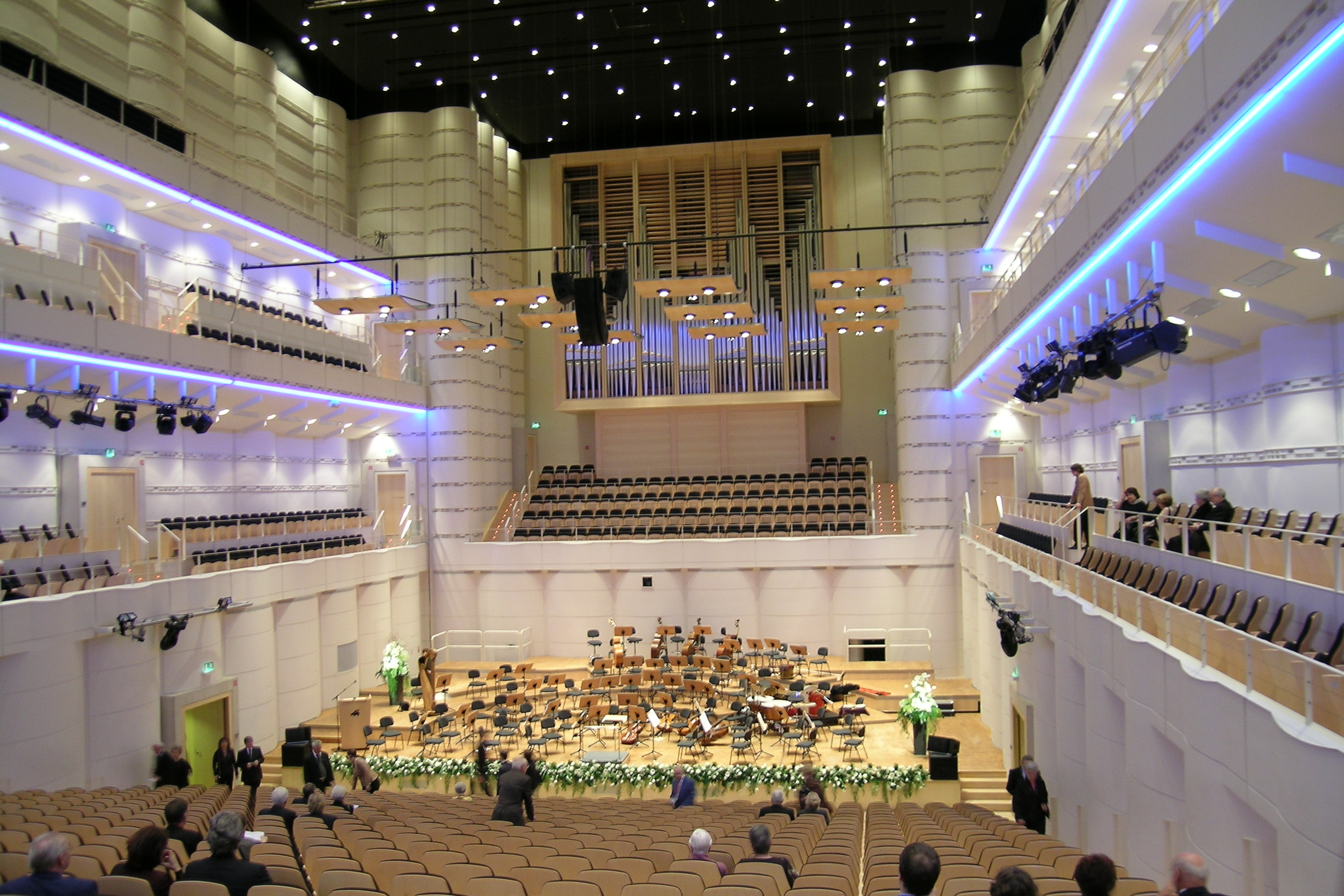
The Konzerthaus Dortmund is one of the most outstanding concert halls in Europe.

The city has a long tradition of music and theatre. The orchestra was founded in 1887 and is now called Dortmunder Philharmoniker. The first opera house was built in 1904, destroyed in World War II and opened again in 1966 as Opernhaus Dortmund. It is operated by Theater Dortmund together with other locations, including (since 2002) the Konzerthaus Dortmund. The Konzerthaus Dortmund is listed in the ECHO list as one of the 21 most outstanding concert halls in Europe.

The Domicil Jazz Club is one of the "100 best jazz venues world wide" according to the American jazz magazine DownBeat.

The Dortmund U-Tower, which was once a brewery, is now European centre for creative economy and the Museum am Ostwall. The area around the U-Tower called "Union Viertel" is part of the Creative.Quarters Ruhr and are rooted in the European Capital of Culture RUHR.2010.

Dortmund leading cabaret-stage is the Cabaret Queue, which is located next to Lake phoenix. Some other famous cabaret-stages are the Fletch Bizzel and the theatre Olpktetal. The most important cabaret event is the RuhrHOCHdeutsch, which is one of the most successful cabaret festivals in Germany. It features artists from around the world.

Dortmund is also famous for its Christmas market, which draws well over three and a half million visitors to its 300 stalls around a gigantic Christmas tree creation that stands 45 metres tall. The market is famous for its handmade ornaments and delicacies.

=== Recreation ===
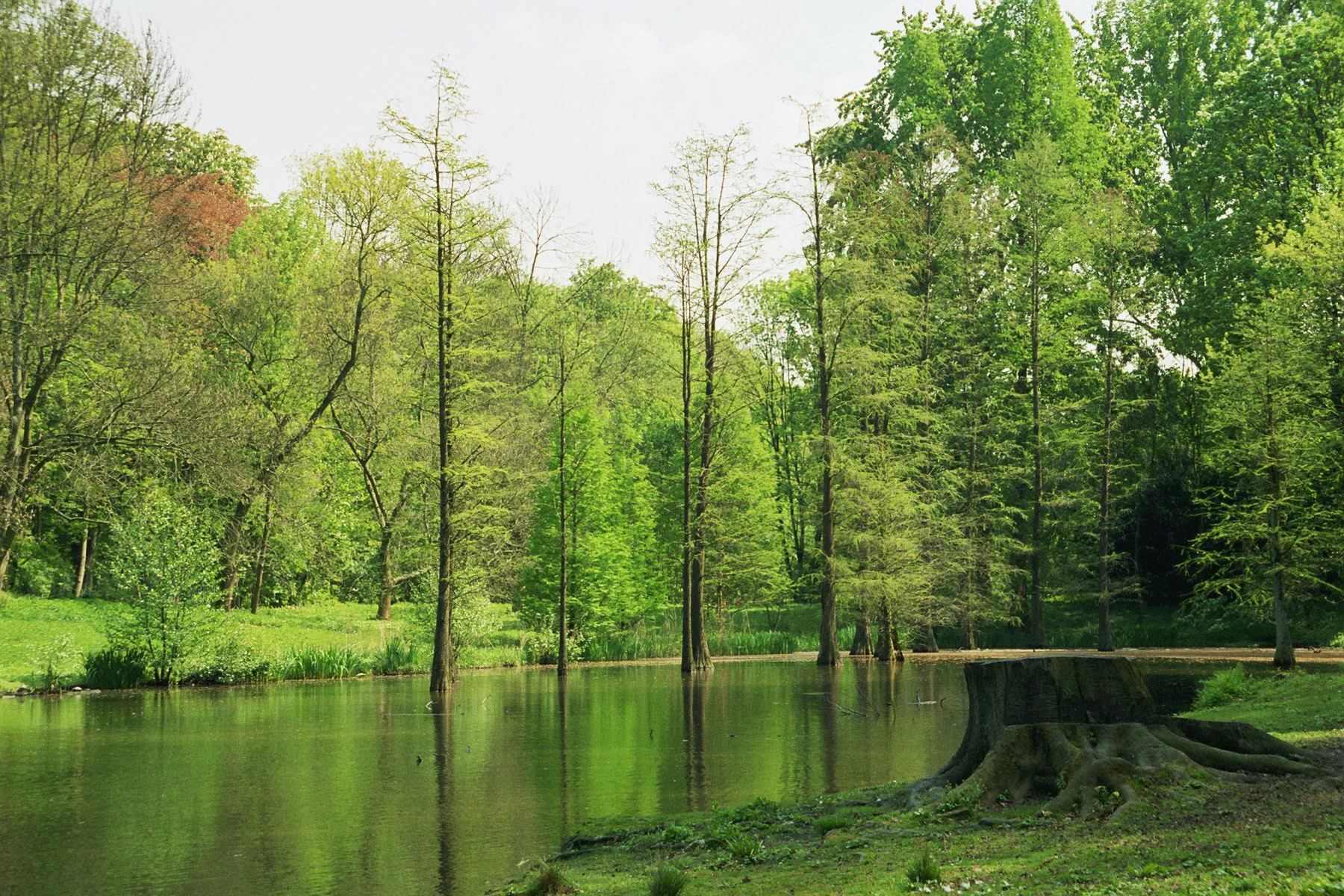
Botanischer Garten Rombergpark

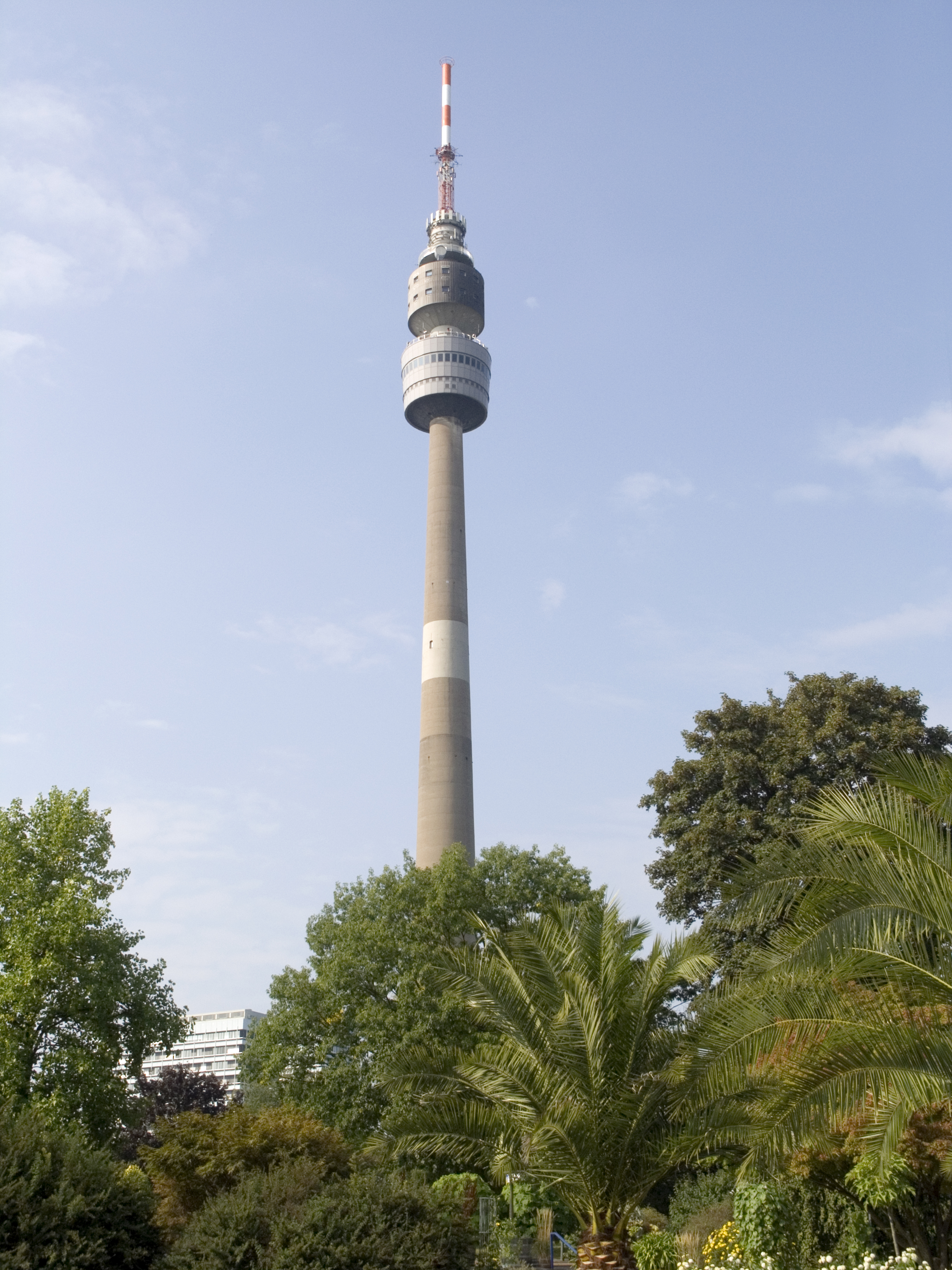
Florianturm, Westfalenpark

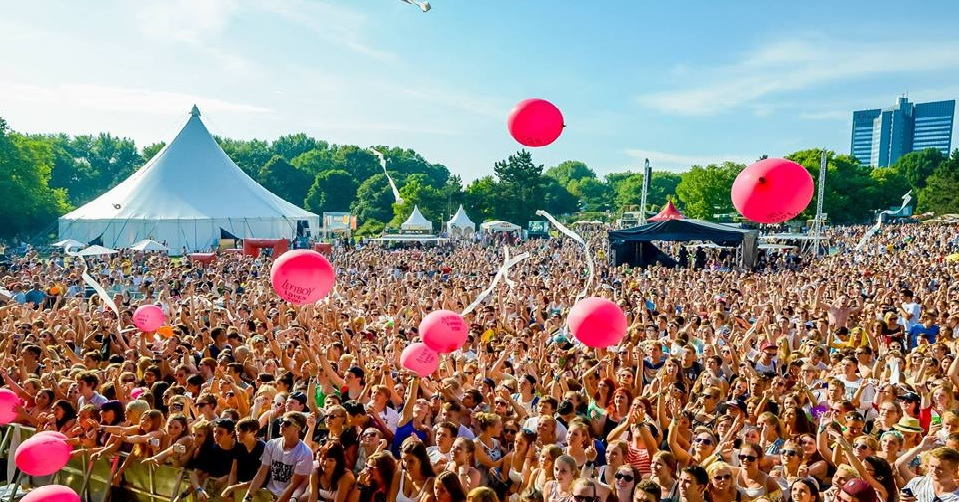
Juicy Beats Festival, Westfalenpark

The Botanischer Garten Rombergpark, or informally Rombergpark, is an extensive municipal arboretum and botanical garden located in the south of the city center of Dortmund. With its total area of 65 hectares the Rombergpark is one of the largest botanical gardens in the world. The garden was established in 1822 as the Romberg family's English landscape park. In 1927–1929 it was acquired by the city and under city planning director Richard Nose enhanced by a small herb garden. The park and castle were badly damaged in World War II, but starting in 1950 director Gerd Krüssmann rebuilt it as an arboretum, adding some 4,500 species to the park. Today the garden contains a historic English landscape park with monuments; an arboretum containing thousands of species of woody plants, including some of the largest trees in North Rhine-Westphalia; a terrace with palm trees; and four greenhouses (1,000 m^{2} total area) for cactus and succulents, ferns, tropical plants, and camellias, jasmine, and lemons.

The Dortmund Zoo is the zoological garden with 28 hectares next to the Rombergpark and was founded 1953. With 1,800 animals belonging to 250 species, the Dortmund Zoo is the second largest in the Ruhr Valley. It is specialized in the keeping and breeding of South American species and is leading in the breeding of the giant anteater, the tamandua, and the giant otter.

The Westfalenpark is Dortmunds's most popular inner-city park. The park is 72 hectares in size and is one of the largest urban gardens of Germany. It was first opened in 1959 as the second Bundesgartenschau (abbr. BUGA) in North Rhine-Westphalia. With the National Rosarium with 3,000 different rose varieties, theme gardens, an environmental protection centre, the German Cookbook Museum, a geological garden, cafés, and recreation areas, it provides numerous opportunities for a day of diverse activities. Dortmund's Westfalenpark is also a popular location for events in the Ruhr area- with parties, festivals, events, theatre, music, and flea and garden markets. One of the best views across the whole Ruhr valley is offered by the visitors platform and the revolving restaurant in the 209-metre-high Florian tower. Another summer attraction is the chair lift, which opened in 1959 and runs on Sundays between a "Mountain" and "Valley" station 500 metres apart.

=== Museums ===
With more than 20 museums, Dortmund has one of the largest variety of museums in the Ruhr Valley, one of which, the LWL Industrial Museum Zollern II/IV Colliery, is an anchor point on the European Route of Industrial Heritage.

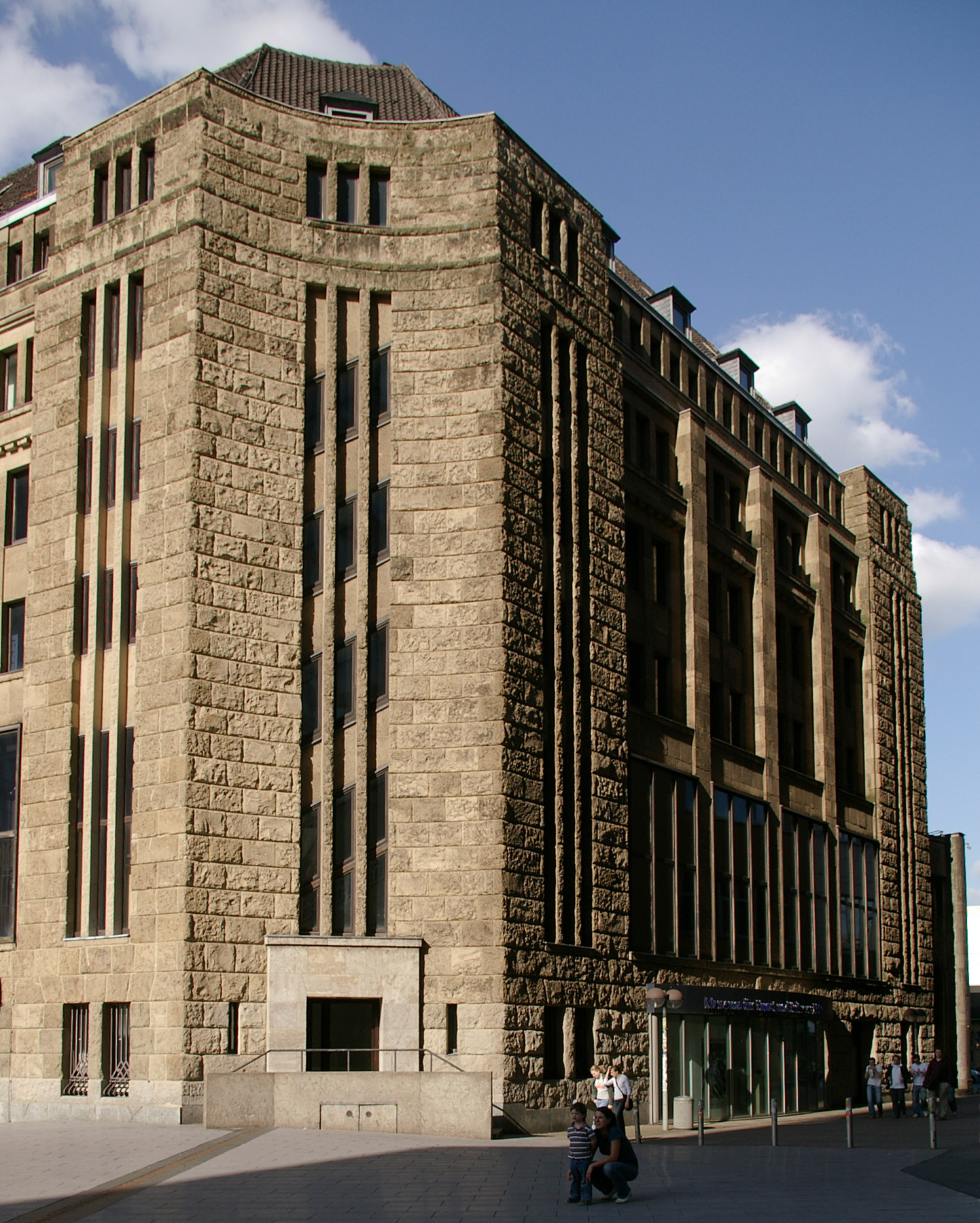
Museum of Art and Cultural History

The Museum am Ostwall (known as Museum am Ostwall until 2010) is a museum of modern and contemporary art. It was founded in the late 1940s, and has been located in the Dortmund U-Tower since 2010. The collection includes paintings, sculptures, objects, and photographs from the 20th century, plus over 2,500 graphics, spanning Expressionism through classic modern art to the present day. At the heart of the collection are works by Ernst Ludwig Kirchner, Otto Mueller, Emil Nolde, and graphics by Pablo Picasso from the 1940s and '50s, plus others by Joan Miró, Marc Chagall, and Salvador Dalí.

The German Football Museum (German: Deutsches Fußballmuseum), aka DFB-Museum, is the national museum for German football. It is located close to the Dortmund Hauptbahnhof and is part of an art and culture mile between the creative center Dortmund U-Tower and the Theater Dortmund, founded to preserve, conserve and interpret important collections of football memorabilia. In its permanent exhibition, the museum presents the history of Germany national football team and the Bundesliga.

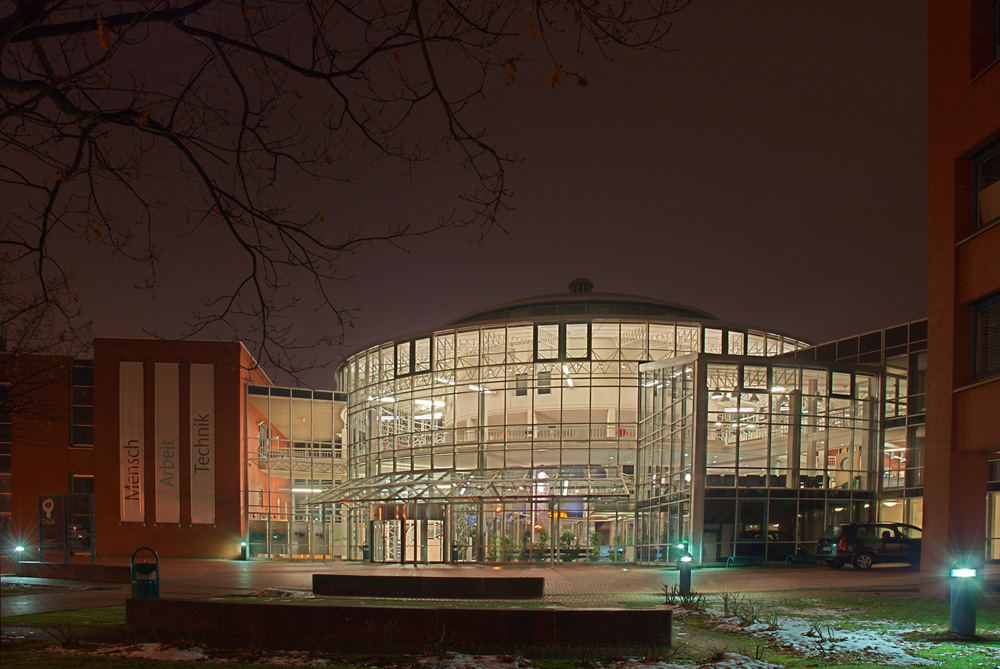
DASA Arbeitswelt Ausstellung

The Museum für Kunst und Kulturgeschichte or MKK (Museum of Art and Cultural History) is a municipal museum located in an Art Deco building which was formerly the Dortmund Savings Bank. The collection includes paintings, sculptures, furniture, and applied art, illustrating the cultural history of Dortmund from early times to the 20th century. There are regular temporary exhibitions of art and culture, as well as a permanent exhibition on the history of surveying, with rare geodetic instruments.

The Steinwache is a memorial museum of the exhibition Widerstand und Verfolgung in Dortmund 1933–1945 ("Resistance and Persecution in Dortmund 1933–1945"), which demonstrates the persecution under National Socialism with many photographs, short texts and sometimes with reports from contemporary witnesses. The museum is located in an old prison and had a reputation as Die Hölle von Westdeutschland ("The hell of western Germany"). Between 1933 and 1945 more than 66,000 people were imprisoned in the Steinwache prison.

Other important museums in Dortmund are:

- DASA – Arbeitswelt Ausstellung (Germany Occupational Health and Safety Exhibition)
- Architecture Archive North Rhine-Westphalia
- Borusseum (Museum of Borussia Dortmund)
- LWL Industrial Museum Zollern II/IV Colliery (Germany's first technical building monument of international importance)
- Museum of natural history Dortmund
- Brewery museum
- HOESCH Museum

Not directly located in Dortmund but important for the city history:

- Henrichenburg boat lift (is a popular destination for cyclists along the canals of the northern Ruhr area).

=== Festivals and nightlife ===
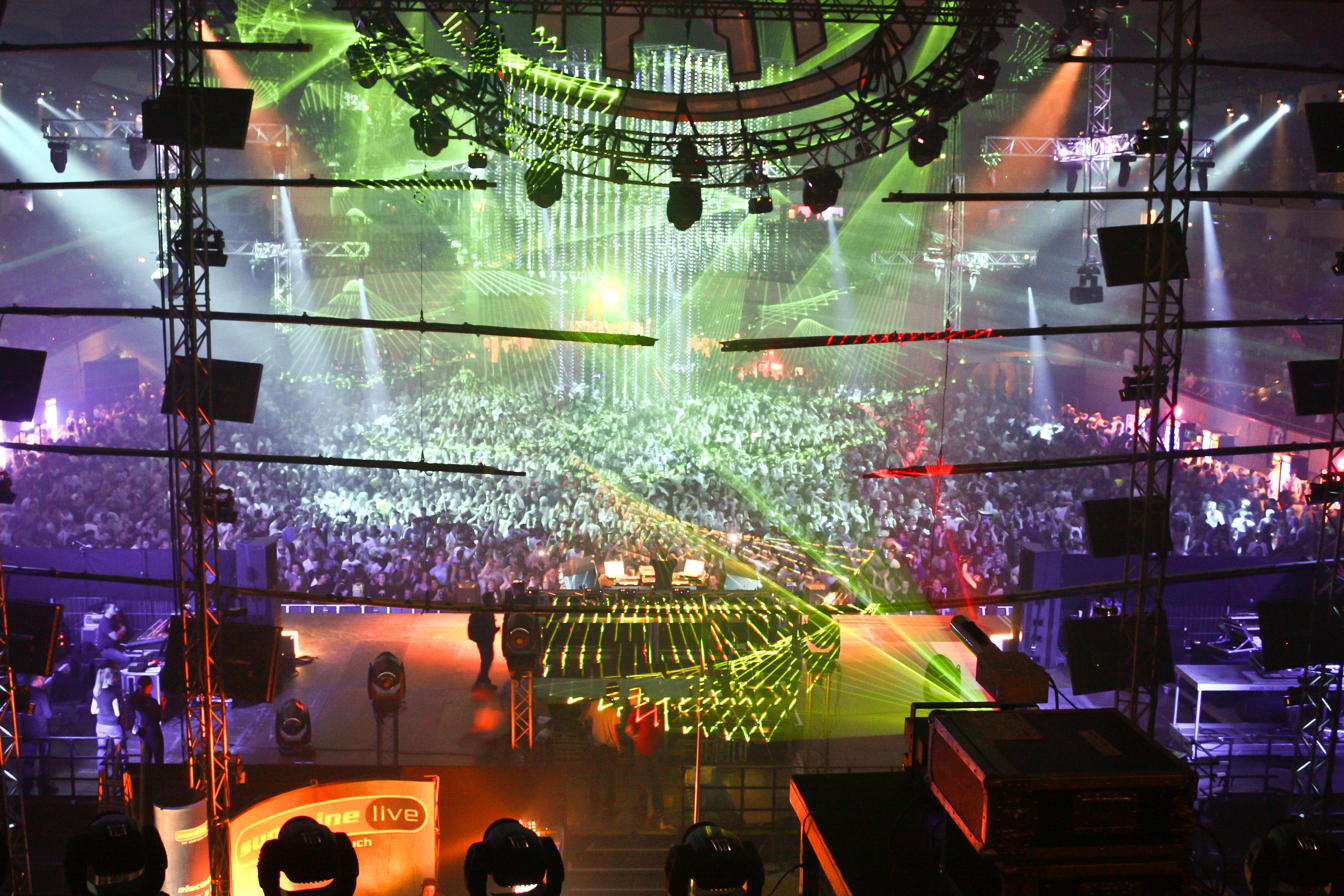
Mayday 2009 Westfalenhallen

Dortmund offers a variety of restaurants, bars and clubs. Clubs concentrate in and around the city centre (Wallring) and in the Kreuzviertel district. Furthermore, Dortmund is one of the main centres of the Electronic dance music and techno subculture. With the Mayday and Syndicate festivals, the Westfalenhalle Arena has become one of the most important techno strongholds in Europe.

After negotiations with several German cities, it was announced that the Love Parade would move to the Ruhr Area for five years (2007–2012). After Essen in 2007 the festival took 2008 place on the Bundesstraße 1 under the motto Highway of Love. The event was planned as a "Love Weekend", with parties throughout the region. For the first time the Turkish electronic scene was represented by its own float, called "Turkish Delights". The official estimate is that 1.6 million visitors attended, making it the largest parade to date.

Juicy Beats is an annual multi-genre music festival held over the last weekend of July at Westfalenpark in Dortmund, Germany. Established in 1996, it has grown into one of the largest independent music festivals in the North Rhine-Westphalia region, drawing peak crowds of over 50,000 attendees. The event features a diverse lineup spanning electronic dance music, hip-hop, indie rock, and pop across multiple stages and open-air dancefloors.

=== Cuisine ===
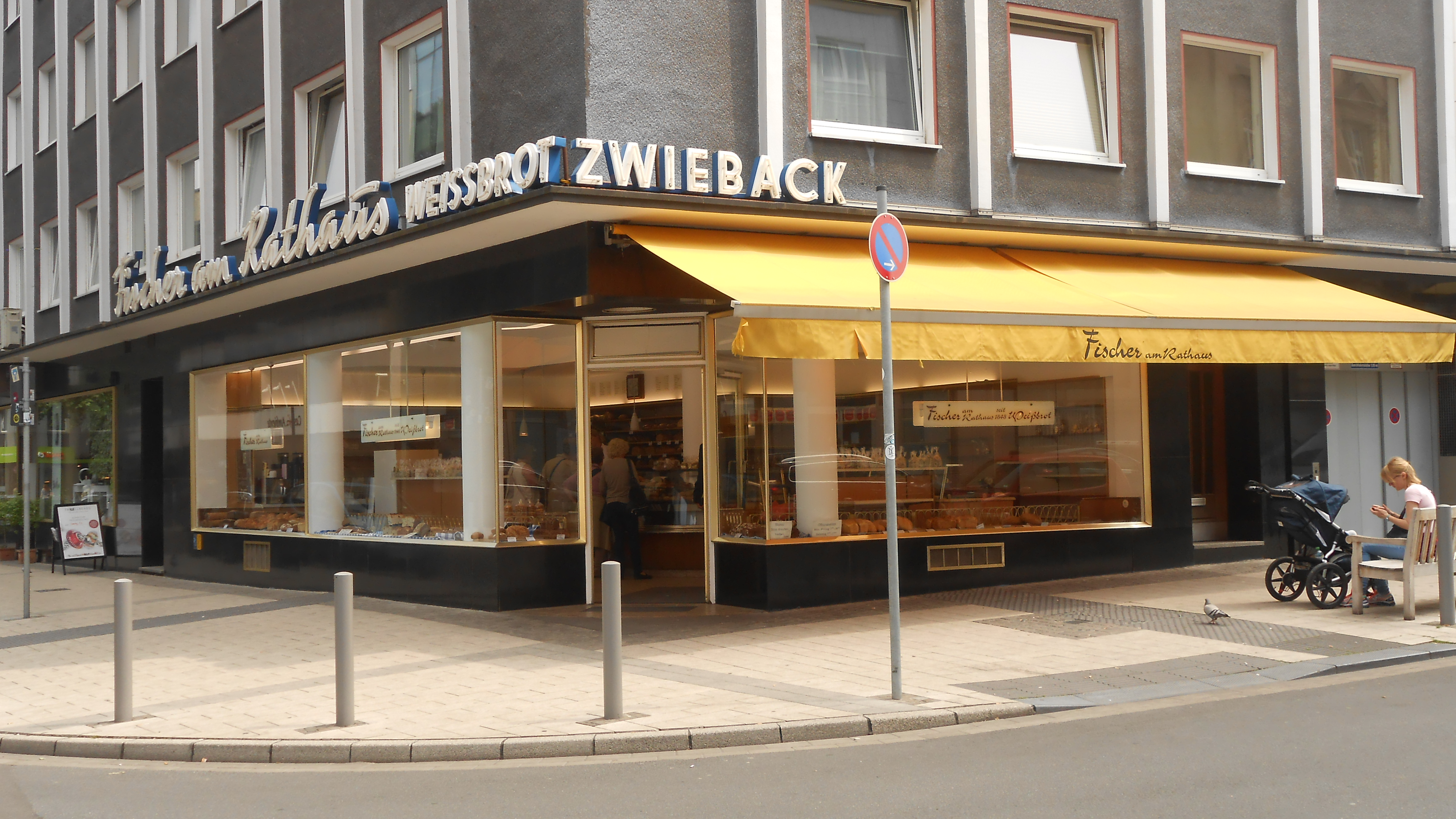
Traditional bakery for Dortmunder Salzkuchen

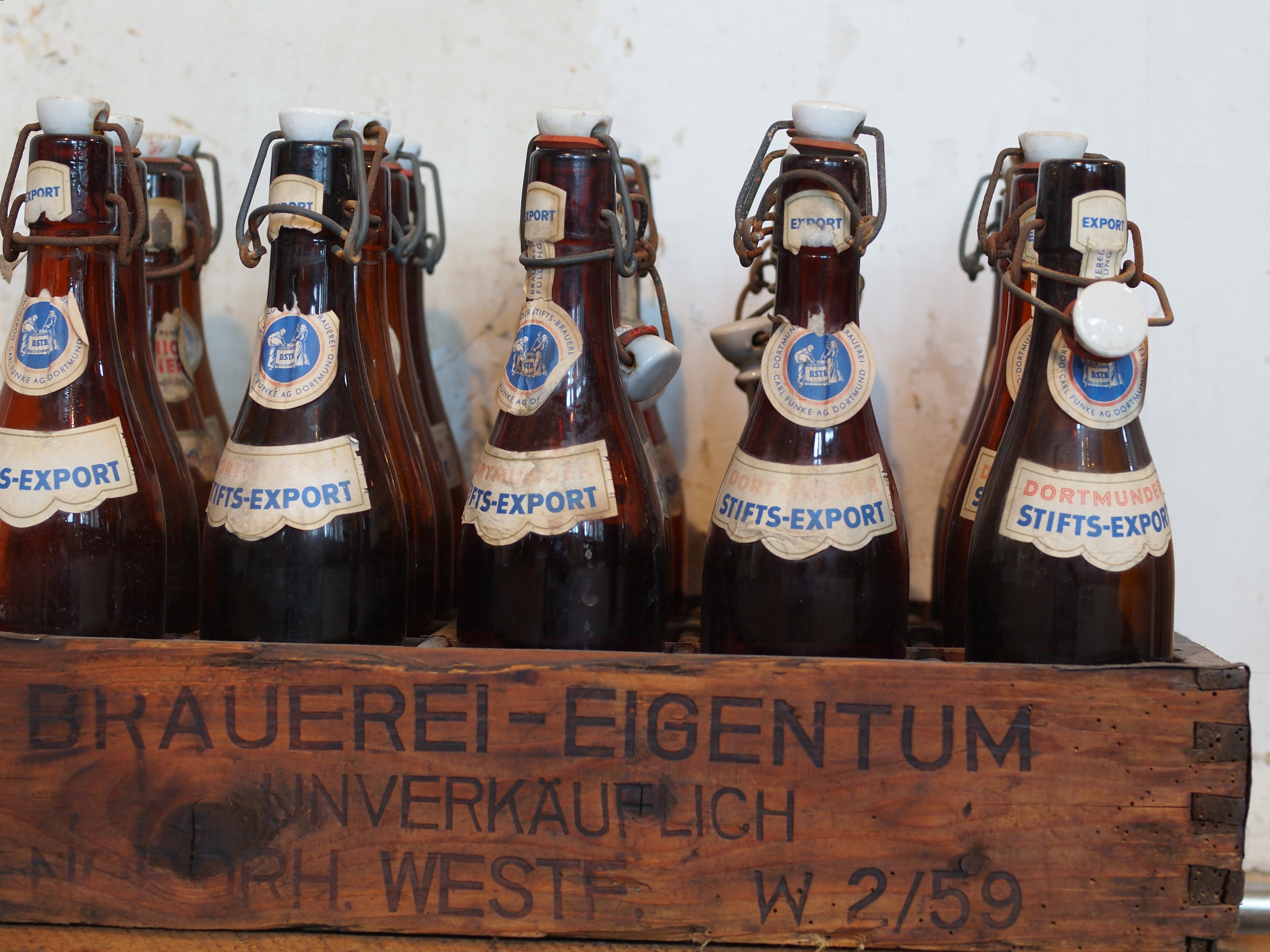
Dortmunder Export

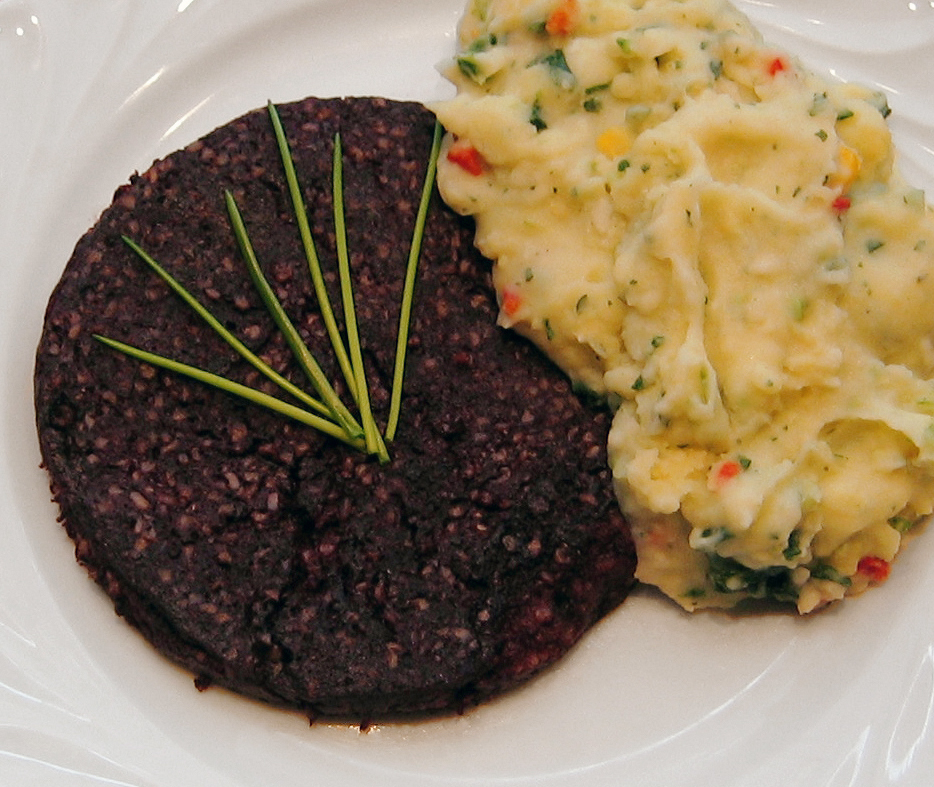
Panhas

Traditional meals in the region are Pfefferpotthast (a form of Goulash, though containing more beef), Balkenbrij, Heaven and Earth (Himmel und Äd; black pudding with stewed apples mixed with mashed potatoes), Currywurst, and Pumpernickel with Griebenschmalz (German lard with crispy pieces of pork skin).

In summer the people like to eat a Dortmunder Salzkuchen (bread buns with caraway seeds, salt, meat, and onions). Also a special meal in the winter is Reibekuchen (fried potato pancake served with apple sauce).

Dortmund had more than 550 years of brewing tradition; some of the oldest breweries in Westphalia are founded around the Old Market in Dortmund. Dortmund is known for its pale lager beer called Dortmunder Export or Dortmunder; it became popular with industrial workers and was responsible for Dortmunder Union becoming Germany's largest brewery and Dortmund having the highest concentration of breweries in Germany. Popular and traditionally beer brands are Dortmunder Actien Brauerei, Bergmann Bier, Kronen, Union, Brinkhoff's, Dortmunder Hansa, Hövels, Ritter, Thier, and Stifts.

"Stösschen" is a beer in a small glass "Stösschen" 0.2 litres and can be drunk in about two draughts. The idea of a Stößchen came about in the 19th century, when people would have to wait at the level crossing to cross the Nordstadt Railway Line that divided the city centre from the Nordstadt district. A local innkeeper realised the potential of serving quick drinks to waiting people, and thus began a Dortmund tradition.

The Dortmunder Tropfen Schnaps is a type of liqueur that is flavored with herbs or spices and traditionally drunk neat as a digestif.

== Sports ==
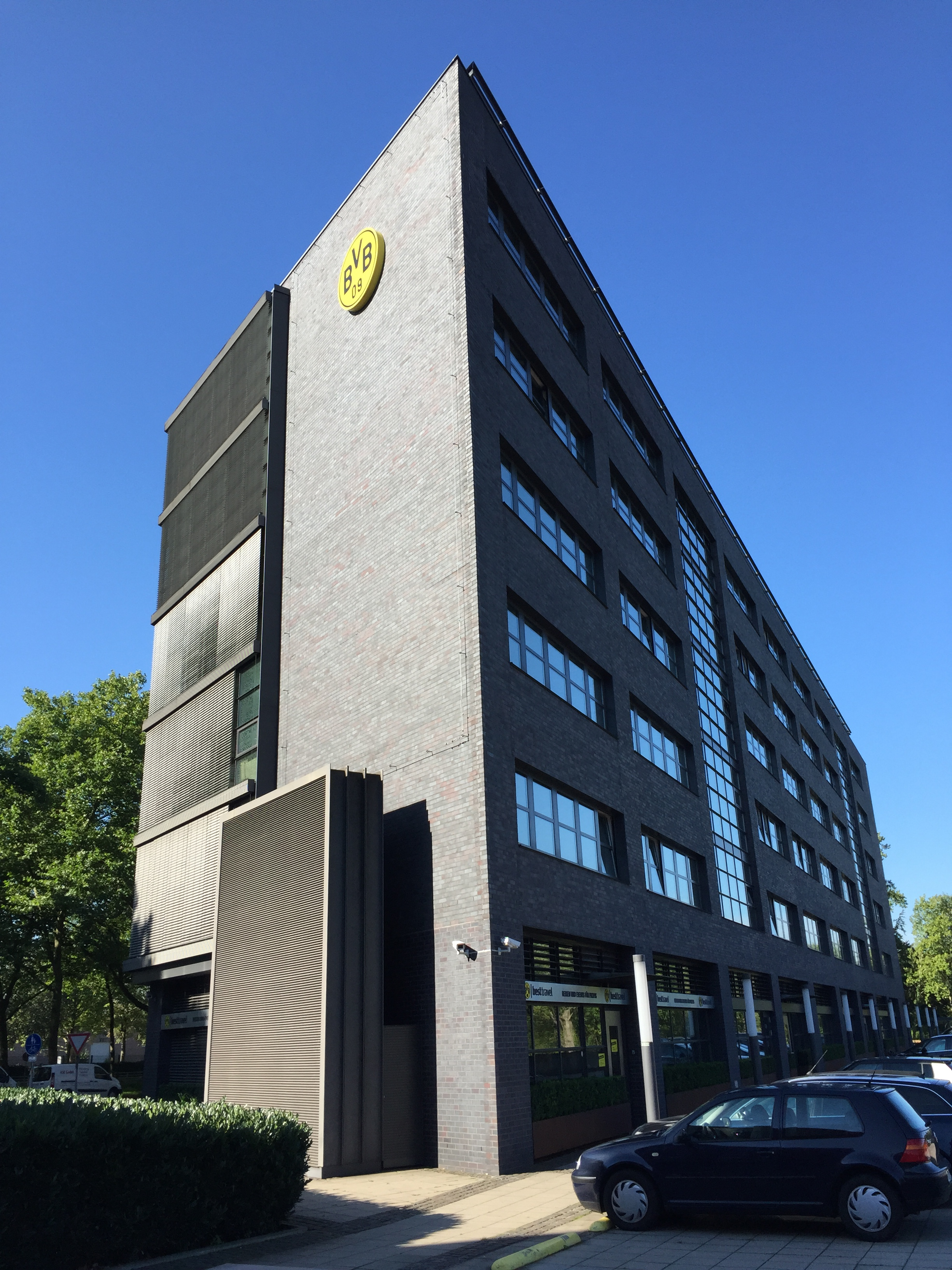
Headquarters of the Borussia Dortmund sports club (BVB)

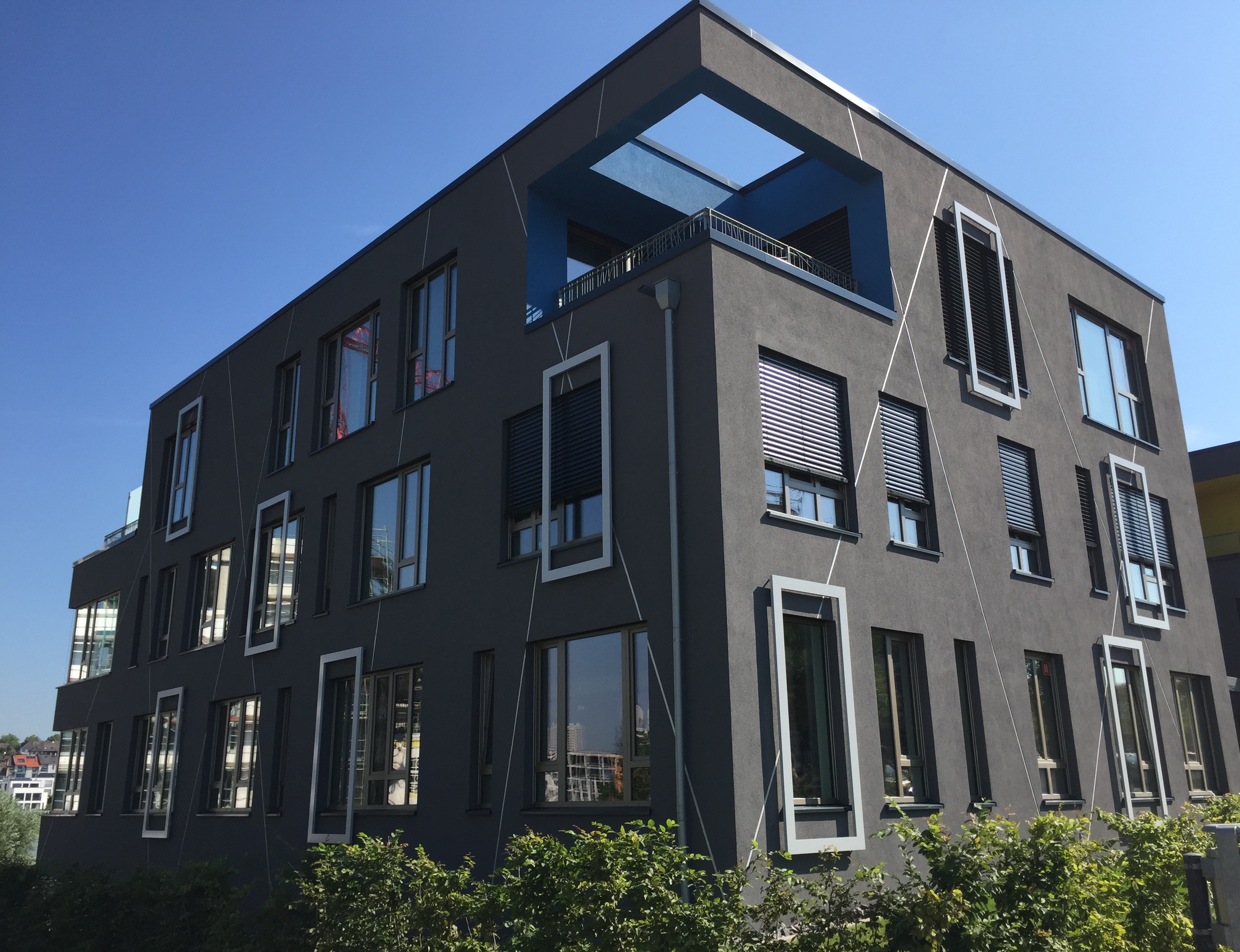
Headquarter DHB

Dortmund calls itself Sportstadt (City of Sports). The city is the home of the biggest handball association in the world, the German Handball Association (German: Deutscher Handballbund) (DHB), and the German professional handball league Handball-Bundesliga (HBL). Furthermore, Dortmund is the designated residence of the Olympic Centre of Westphalia.

The city is home to many sports clubs, iconic athletes and annually organises several world-renowned sporting events, such as the Ruhrmarathon and the Sparkassen Chess-Meeting.

=== Football ===
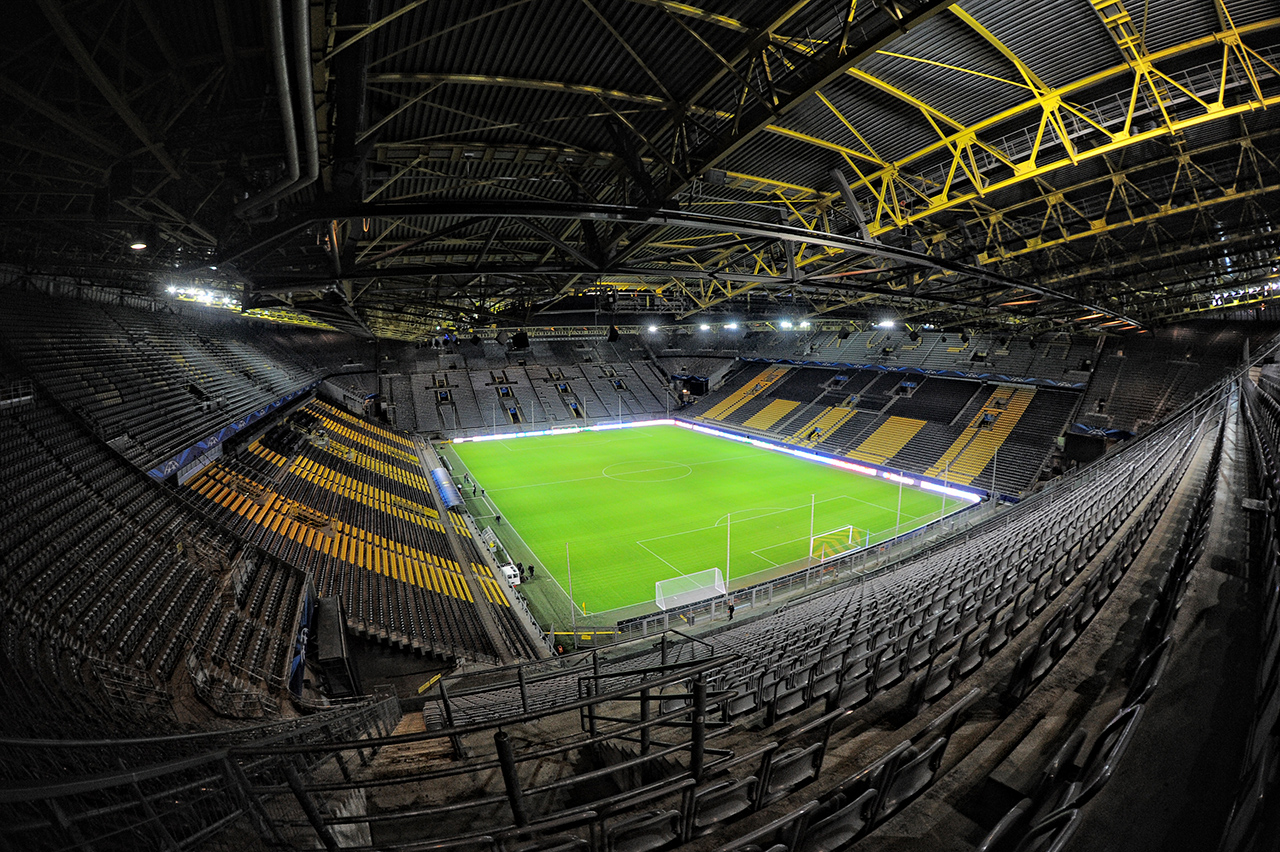
Signal Iduna Park, the home stadium of Bundesliga club Borussia Dortmund, is the biggest stadium in Germany.

Dortmund is home to the sports club Borussia Dortmund, one of the most successful clubs in German football history. Borussia Dortmund are former Bundesliga champions, most recently in 2011–12. Borussia Dortmund won the UEFA Champions League and the Intercontinental Cup in 1997, as well as the UEFA Cup Winners' Cup in 1966. 'Die Borussen' are eight-time German Champions and have won five German Cups. Borussia Dortmund play at Westfalenstadion, currently known as Signal Iduna Park. It was built for the 1974 FIFA World Cup and also hosted some matches of the 2006 FIFA World Cup. It is Germany's largest football stadium, with a maximum capacity of 81,359 spectators.

=== Handball ===
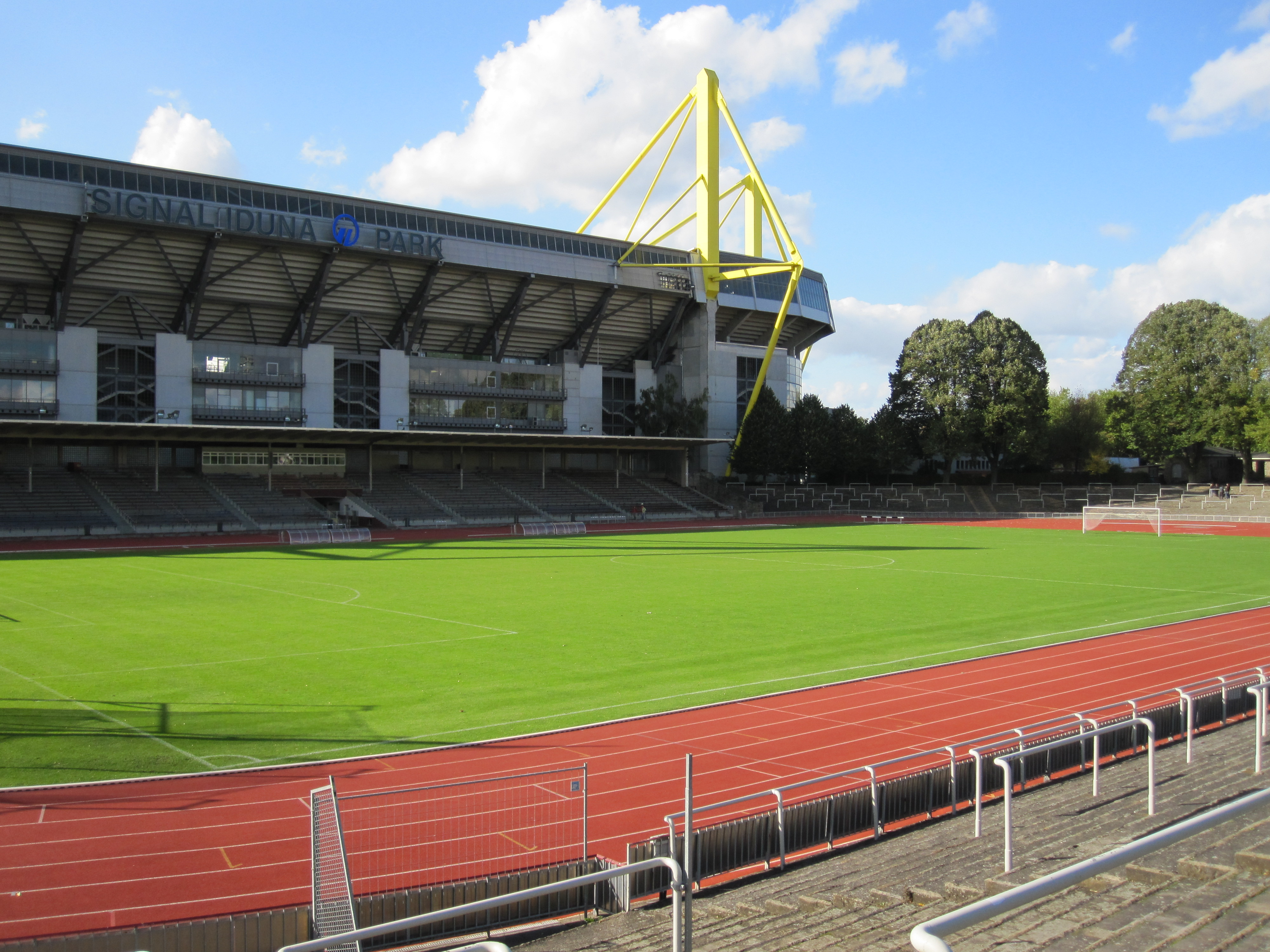
Stadion Rote Erde

Borussia Dortmund has a women's handball team playing in the first Bundesliga.

=== Table tennis ===
Borussia Dortmund also has a table tennis team, playing in the second Bundesliga.

=== American football ===
The Dortmund Giants, established on 22 May 1980, is an American football team from Dortmund. The official name of the club is 1. Dortmunder Footballclub Dortmund 1980 "Giants" e.V. The club spent the 1994 season in the 2. Bundesliga before dropping for two seasons to the third tier Regionalliga West. Five more 2. Bundesliga seasons followed from 1997 to 2001, the final one in a combined team with the Bochum Cadets as the Dortmund B1 Giants. After a five-season spell in the Regionalliga, the club finished the 2014 season without a win and had to return to the Oberliga once more.

=== Ice hockey ===
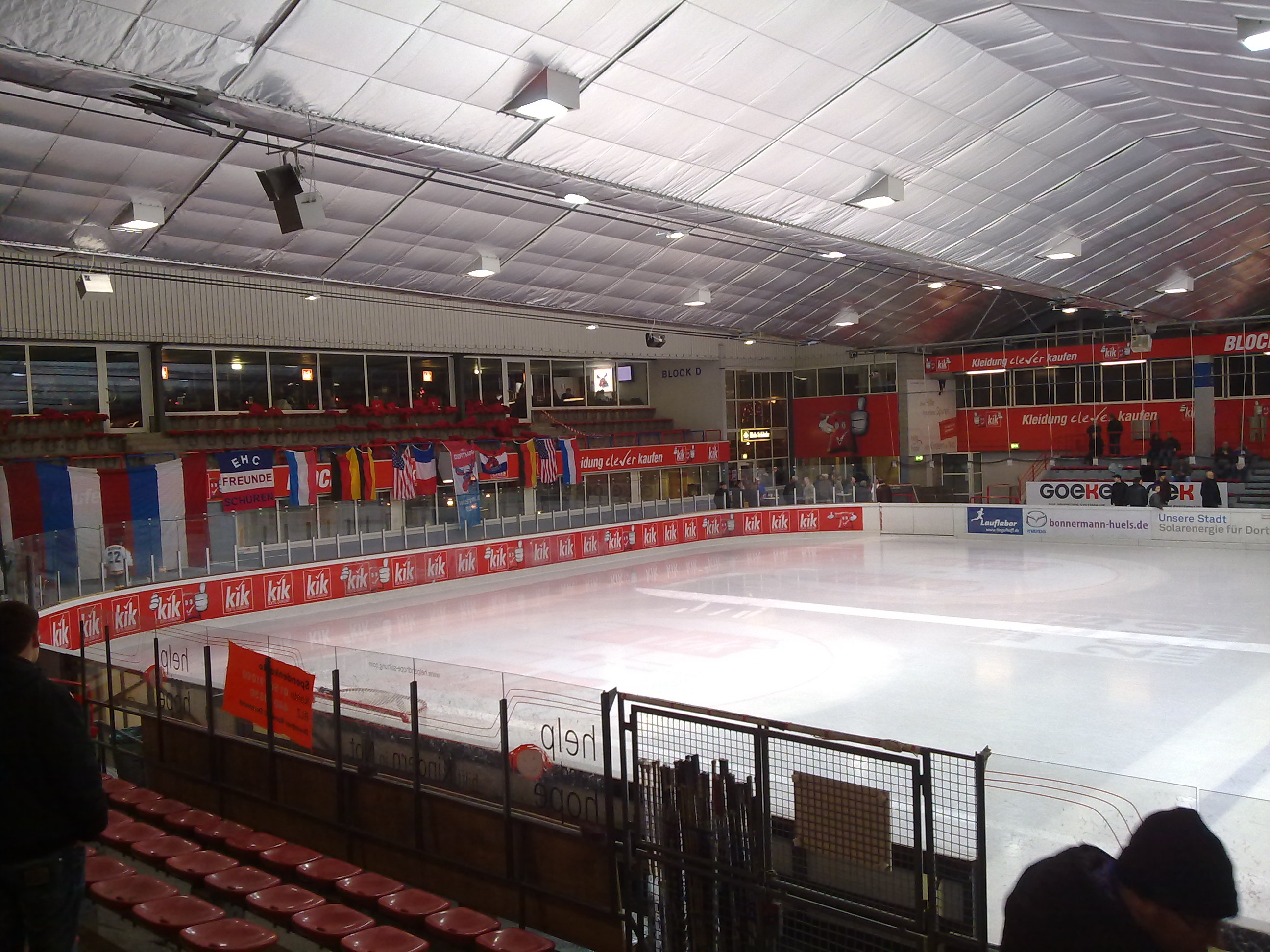
Eissportzentrum Westfalenhallen

Eisadler Dortmund is the city's ice hockey club that plays in Eissportzentrum Westfalenhallen, an indoor sporting arena at the Strobelallee. They played in 2016/17 in the Oberliga, the third level of ice hockey in Germany.

=== Basketball ===
The city's basketball team is SVD 49 Dortmund, which plays in the respective national second division.

=== Baseball ===
The city's baseball club Dortmund Wanderers plays in the first Bundesliga.

=== Other sports ===
The Sparkassen Chess-Meeting has been hosted in Dortmund since 1982.

Besides, Dortmund owns an all-weather racecourse named Galopprennbahn Dortmund.

== Twin towns – sister cities ==
Dortmund is twinned with:

- Leeds, United Kingdom (1949)
- Amiens, France (1960)
- Rostov-on-Don, Russia (1973)
- Buffalo, United States (1979)
- Netanya, Israel (1980)
- Novi Sad, Serbia (1982)
- Zwickau, Germany (1989)
- Xi'an, China (1991)
- Trabzon, Turkey (2014)

== Notable people ==
=== Born before 1900 ===
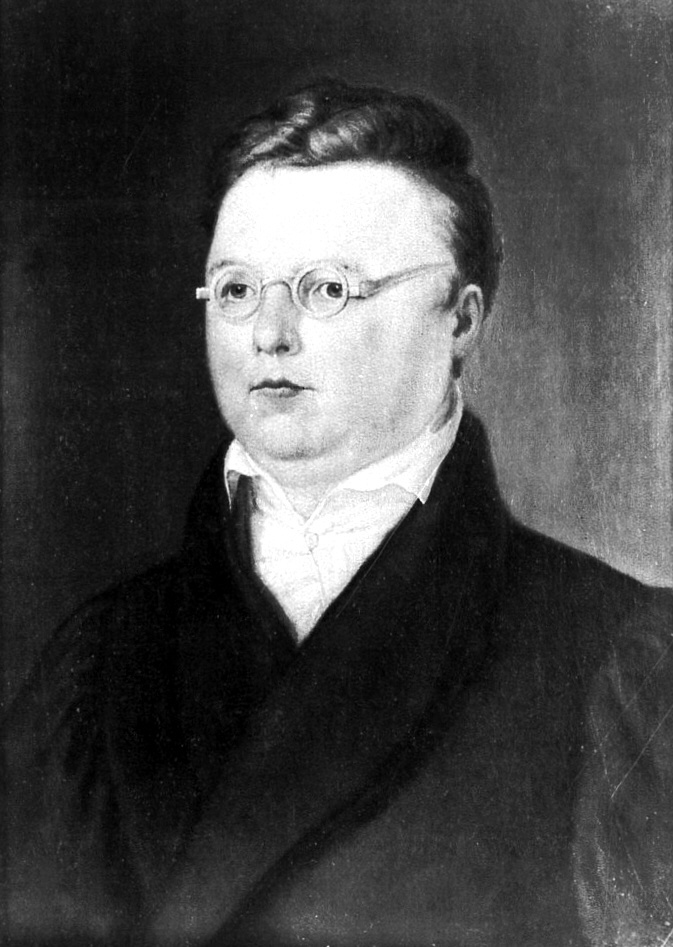
Friedrich Arnold Brockhaus

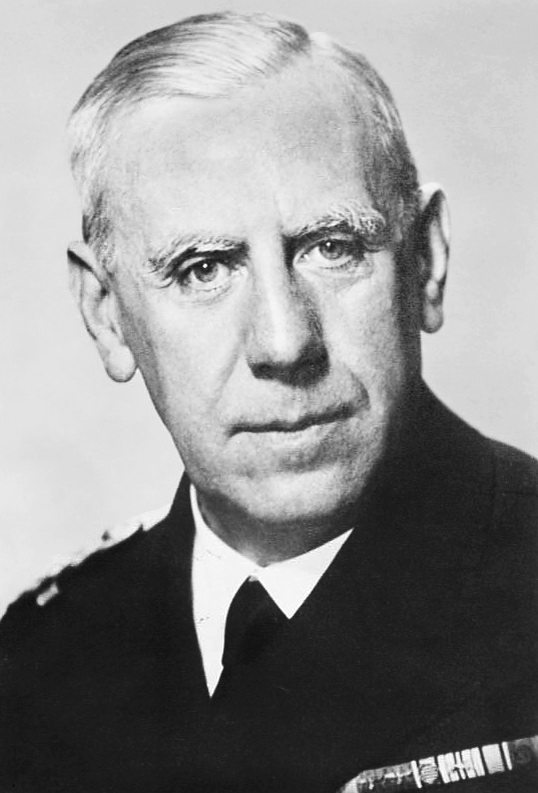
Wilhelm Canaris, 1940

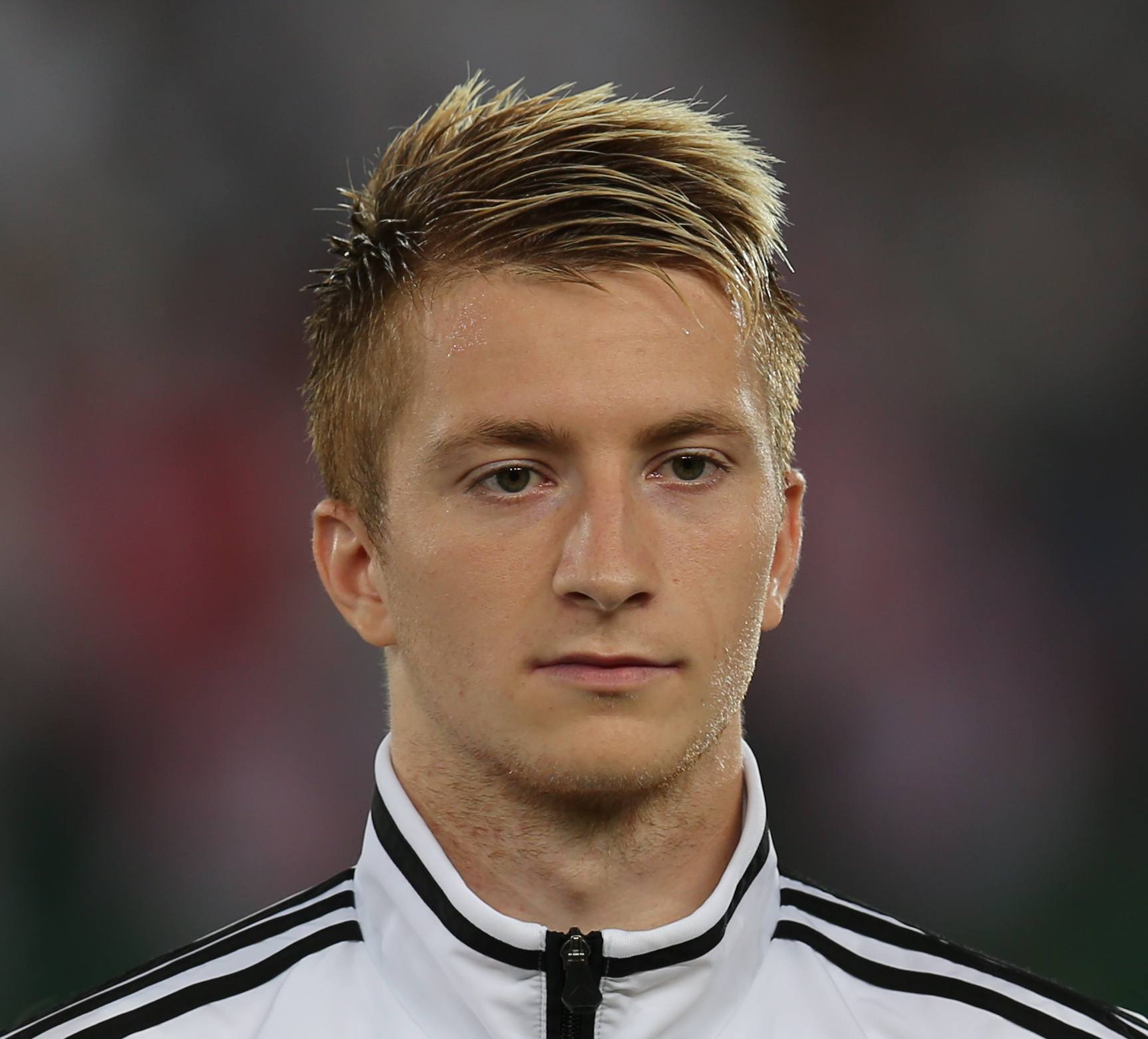
Marco Reus

- Friedrich Arnold Brockhaus (1772–1823), publisher, founder of the publishing house "F. A. Brockhaus" and editor of Brockhaus Encyclopedia
- William Middendorf (1793–1853), theologian and educator
- Emil Anneke (1823–1888), revolutionary and American journalist, and lawyer
- Wilhelm Lübke (1826–1893), art historian
- Henry C. Berghoff (1856–1925), lawyer, businessman and politician
- Adolf Schmal (1872–1919), Austrian sportsman
- Wilhelm Canaris (1887–1945), admiral and chief of the military intelligence service
- Richard Drauz (1894–1946), executed as a war criminal. He headed up the NSDAP in the Heilbronn district.
- Konrad Schragmüller (1895–1934), SA general killed in the Night of the Long Knives
- Friedrich Schubert, (1897–1947), World War II Nazi war criminal; executed

=== Born 1901–1950 ===
- Edmund Forschbach (1903–1988), lawyer and politician
- Walter Haenisch (1905–1938), author and communist, victim of Stalinism
- Walter Blume (1906–1974), lawyer and SS officer
- Fritz Henle (1909–1993), photographer
- Albrecht Brandi (1914–1966), naval officer
- Heinz Stahlschmidt (1919–2010), sergeant and fire fighter
- Paul Falk (1921-2017), ice pair skater
- Ria Baran (1922-1984), ice pair skater
- Dieter Wellershoff (1933–2005), admiral, Inspector General of the Bundeswehr
- Gerhard Cyliax (1934–2008), football player
- Elga Andersen (1935–1994), actress and singer
- Hans Tilkowski (1935–2020), football goalkeeper and coach
- Dieter Fenske (born 1942), inorganic chemist
- Christine Haidegger (1942–2021), Austrian writer
- Annegret Richter (born 1950), sprinter
- Hermann Spieckermann (born 1950), Protestant theologian

=== Born after 1950 ===
- Klaus Niedzwiedz (born 1951), racing driver and television presenter
- Beate West-Leuer (born 1951), professor, psychotherapist, consultant and coach
- Eve Stratford (born 1953), Playboy Club Bunny, victim of unsolved murder in London in 1975
- Ulla Burchardt (born 1954), politician (SPD)
- Klaus Segbers (born 1954), political scientist and professor
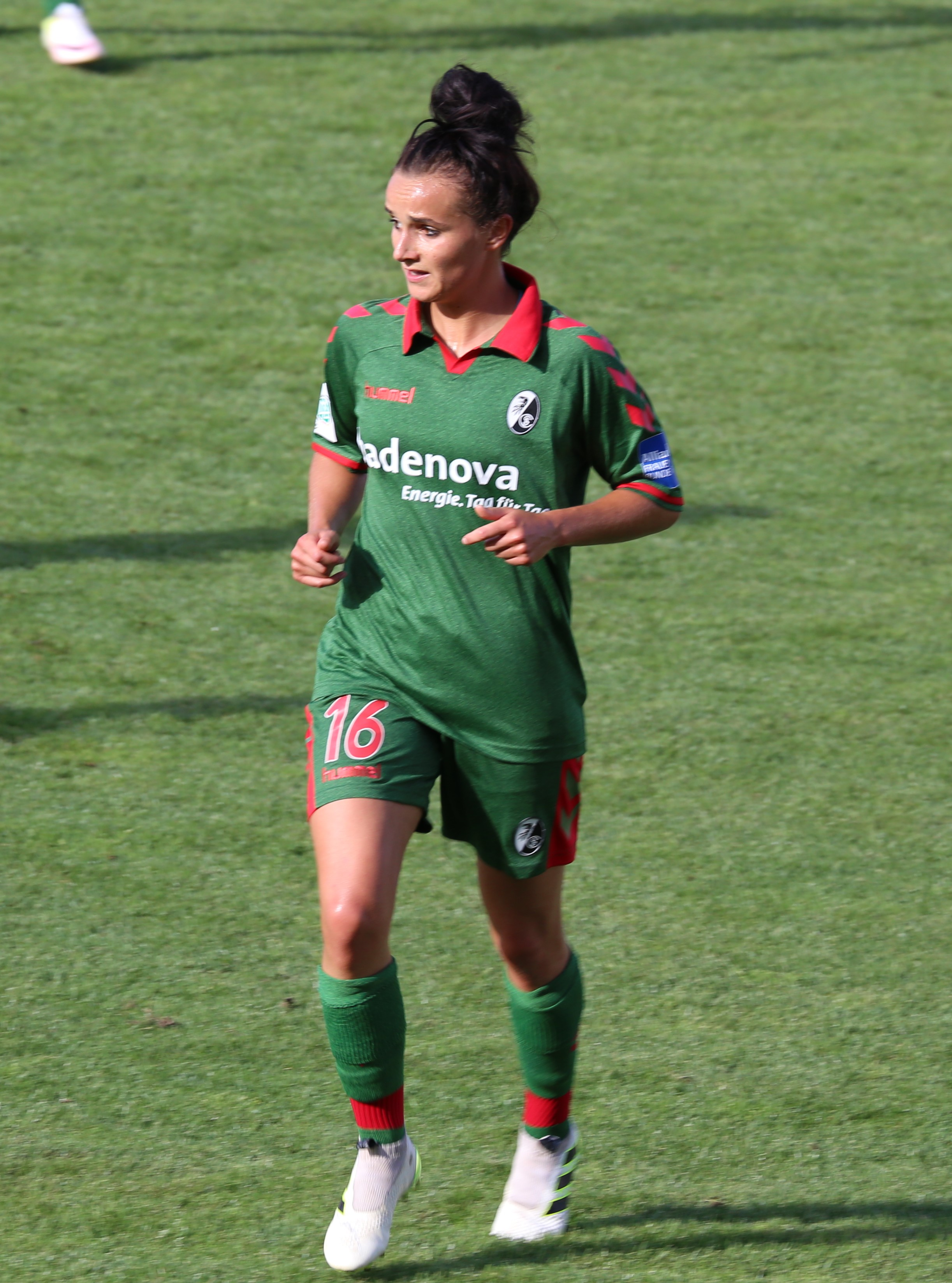
  Lina Magull
- Antony Theodore (born 1954), poet, educator and social worker
- Susanne Kippenberger (born 1957), journalist and writer
- Achim Peters (born 1957), obesity specialist
- Barbara Havliza (born 1958), politician (CDU) and judge
- Dietmar Bär (born 1961), actor
- Stefan Heinig (born 1962), director and shareholder
- Martin Zawieja (born 1963), weightlifter
- Ralf Husmann (born 1964), writer, producer and author
- Vincent Mennie (born 1964), Scottish footballer
- Matthias Kohring (born 1965), media and communications scientist
- Torsten Sträter (born 1966), comedian
- Marco Werner (born 1966), racing driver
- André Erkau (born 1968), director and screenwriter
- Florian Schwarthoff (born 1968), hurdler, bronze medallist in 110 m hurdles at the 1996 Olympic Games
- Marco Bülow (1971–2026), journalist and politician
- Yasemin Şamdereli (born 1973), film director and screenwriter
- Kevin Grosskreutz (born 1988), football player
- Marco Reus (born 1989), football player
- Lina Magull (born 1994), football player
- Jasmin Selberg (born 1999), Miss International 2022

== Bibliography ==
- "Dortmund" . Encyclopædia Britannica. Vol. 8 (11th ed.). 1910. p. 437.
- G. Hennings & K.R. Kunzmann (1990). "Priority to local economic development: industrial restructuring and local development responses in the Ruhr area – the case of Dortmund". In Walter B. Stöhr (ed.). Global Challenge and Local Response: Initiatives for Economic Regeneration in Contemporary Europe. United Nations University Press. ISBN 978-0-7201-2064-6.
- Trudy Ring, ed. (1995). "Dortmund". Northern Europe. International Dictionary of Historic Places. Fitzroy Dearborn. p. 215+. ISBN 978-1-136-63944-9.
