= Timeline of Dortmund =

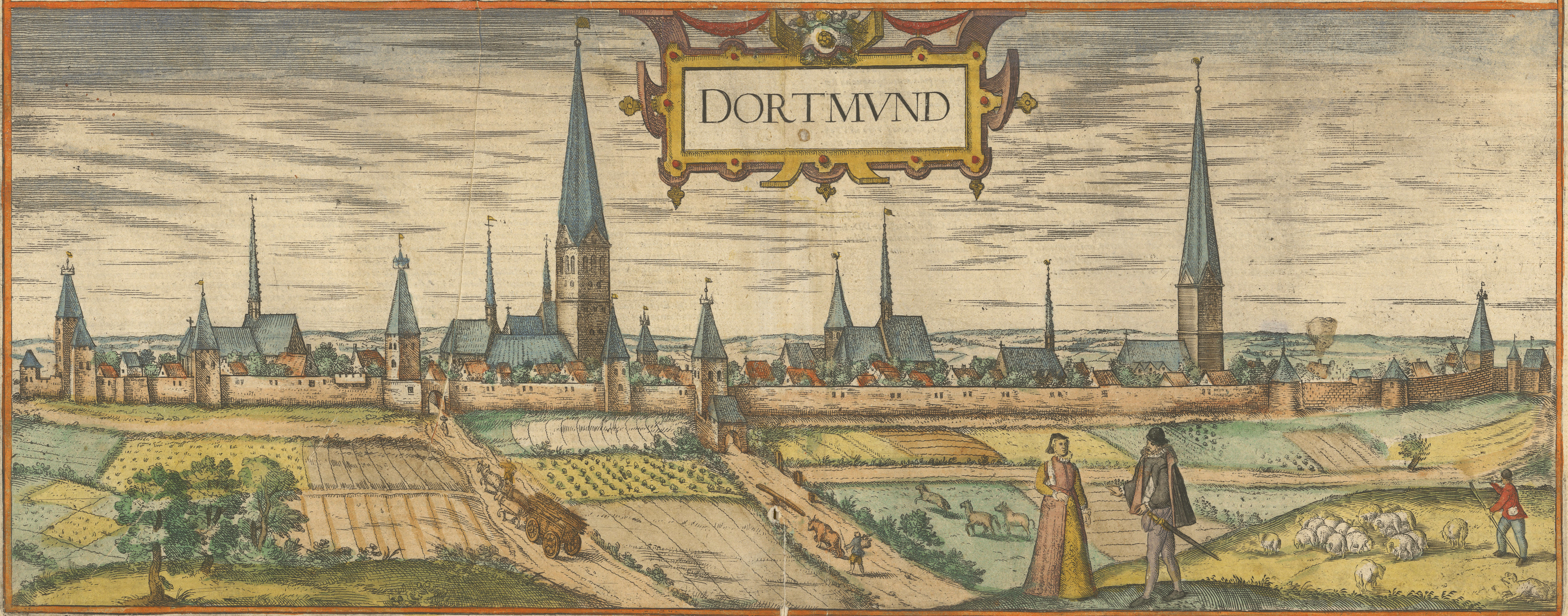
Dortmund, 16th century

The following is a timeline of the history of the city of Dortmund, Germany.

== Prior to 19th century ==
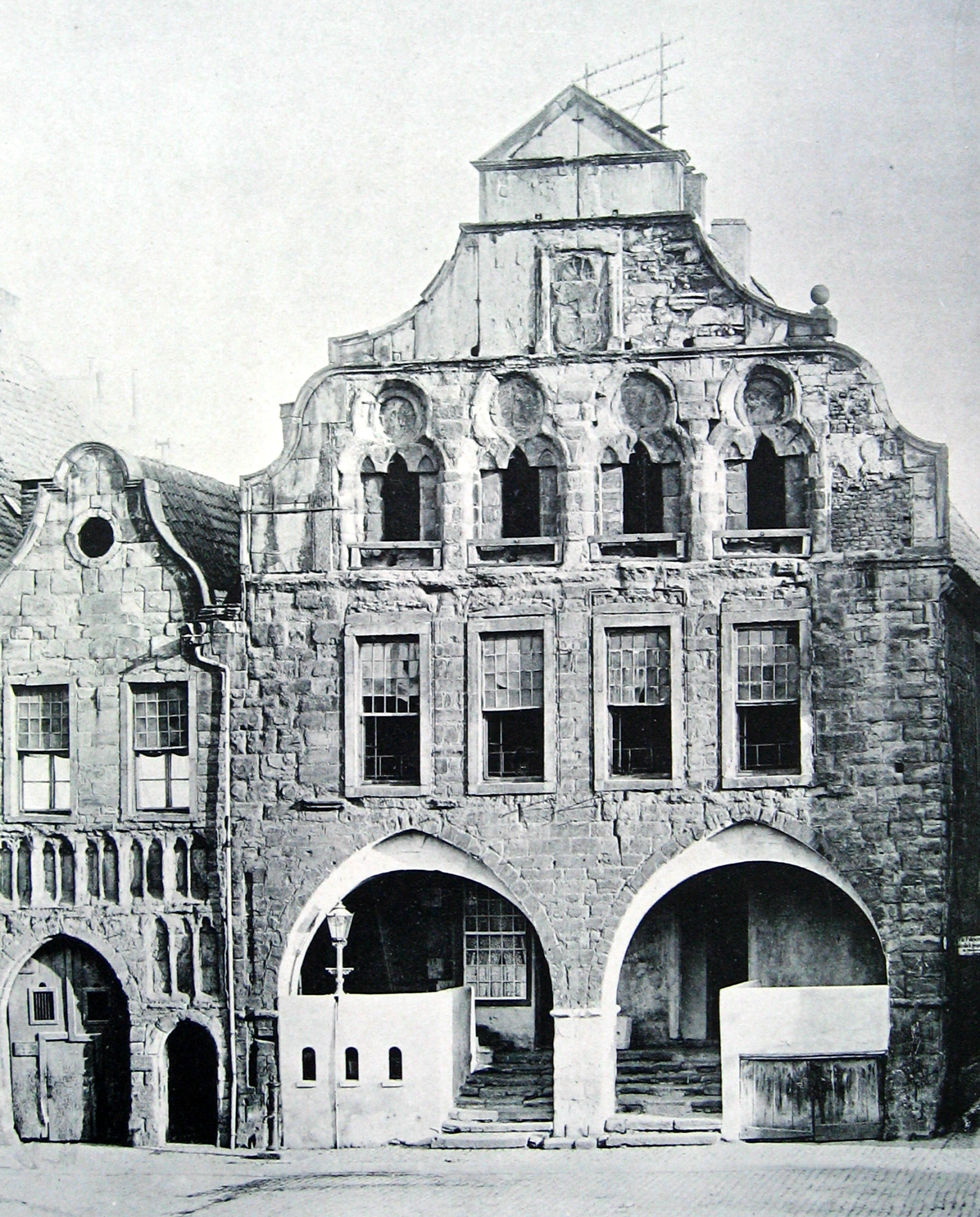
Old Town Hall, in use circa 1240 (photo circa 1890s)

- 1005 – Henry II, Holy Roman Emperor holds an "ecclesiastical council" in Dortmund.
- 1016 – Henry II, Holy Roman Emperor holds an "Imperial diet" in Dortmund.
- 1215 – Katharinenkloster Dortmund consecrated.
- 1220 – Dortmund becomes an imperial city of the Holy Roman Empire.
- 1240 – Town Hall in use (approximate date).
- 1253 – Dortmund joins the City Alliance of Werne.
- 1267 – St. Mary's Church first mentioned.
- 1270 – St. Reinold's Church built.
- 1293 – Brewing right granted.
- 1322 – St. Peter's Church, Dortmund (church) construction begins.
- 1332 – City rights confirmed per "Privilegium Ludovicum."
- 1387/8 – Dortmund besieged by forces of Friedrich III. von Saarwerden, Archbishop of Cologne.
- 1388 – Dortmunder Bürgerschützenverein (militia) formed.
- 1400 – Vehmic court established (approximate date).
- 1454 – Tower built on St. Reinold's Church.
- 1521 – "Golden Wonder of Westphalia" altarpiece installed in the Petrikirche.
- 1523 – Protestant Reformation.
- 1543 – Stadtgymnasium Dortmund (school) founded.
- 1546 – Tower for the Dortmund City Archive added to Town Hall.
- 1570 – Dortmund adopts Lutheranism per the "Augsburg Confession".
- 1609 – Jülich-Cleves-related agreement signed in Dortmund.

== 19th century ==
- 1803 – Dormund "annexed to Nassau."
- 1806 – French in power.
- 1808 – Dormund becomes capital of French satellite Ruhr (department).
- 1815
  - Dortmund becomes part of Prussia per Congress of Vienna.
  - Oberbergamt Dortmund (regional mining office) headquartered in city.
- 1816 – Population: 4,465.
- 1841 – Sparkasse Dortmund (bank) founded.
- 1847 – Duisburg–Dortmund railway and Dortmund–Hamm railway begin operating.
- 1849 – Elberfeld–Dortmund railway begins operating.
- 1855 – Dortmund–Soest railway begins operating.
- 1861
  - Westfälischer Schützenbund (shooting-sport club) formed.
  - Population: 23,348.
- 1863 – City walls dismantled.
- 1871
  - Hoesch AG steel company in business.
  - Westfalenhütte industrial area developed.
- 1872 – Historischer Verein für Dortmund und die Grafschaft Mark (historical society) founded.
- 1875
  - Dortmund–Gronau railway in operation.
  - Population:57,742.
- 1878 – Ernst Heinrich Lindemann becomes mayor.
- 1880 – Fredenbaumpark in use (approximate date).
- 1883 – Museum of Art and Cultural History founded.
- 1885 – Population: 78,435.
- 1887 – Dortmund Philharmonic orchestra formed.
- 1890
  - Royal School of Machine Building established.
  - Population: 89,663.
- 1895
  - Oberpostdirektion Dortmund (regional postal administration) established.
  - Post office built.
  - Population: 111,232.
- 1897 – City electric power system begins operating.
- 1898 – Industrial School for Young Ladies and Ruderclub Hansa von 1898 (sport club) established.
- 1899
  - Dortmund–Ems Canal and Dortmund Port open.
  - City Hall restored.
  - Dortmunder Volksbank founded.
- 1900
  - Regional Handwerkskammer Dortmund (Chamber of Skilled Crafts) headquartered in city.
  - Synagogue built.

== 20th century ==
=== 1900s–1945 ===
- 1901 – Dortmund Fire Department established.
- 1904
  - Theater Dortmund and trade school founded.
  - Bismarckturm (Dortmund) (tower) built.
- 1905 – Population: 175,577.
- 1909
  - Borussia Dortmund sport club formed.
  - Nordmarkt area laid out.
- 1910
  - Dortmund Hauptbahnhof built.
  - Population: 214,226.
- 1914 – Eving becomes part of city.
- 1919 – Population: 295,026.
- 1920
  - Regional Siedlungsverband Ruhrkohlenbezirk municipal association created.
  - Population: 313,752.
- 1924 – Weisse Wiese stadium opens.
- 1926 – Botanischer Garten Rombergpark acquired by city.
- 1927 – Dortmund U-Tower built.
- 1928
  - Hörde becomes part of city.
  - Population: 465,196.
- 1929 – Berghofen (Dortmund) and Syburg become part of city.
- 1933 – Dortmund-Hörder Hüttenunion mining company in business.
- 1938 – Dortberghaus built.
- 1939 – Nazi camp for Sinti and Romani people established (see also Porajmos).
- 1943
  - May: SS construction brigade (forced labour camp) established by the SS.
  - September: SS construction brigade presumably dissolved.
- 1944 – Subcamp of the Buchenwald concentration camp established for 400 Polish women who survived the Warsaw Uprising (see also Nazi crimes against the Polish nation).
- 1945
  - March: women's subcamp of Buchenwald dissolved. Prisoners deported to the Bergen-Belsen concentration camp.
  - 13 April: allied forces take city.

=== 1946–1990s ===
- 1946
  - Fritz Henßler becomes mayor.
  - Westfälische Rundschau newspaper begins publication.
- 1947
  - 29 March: miners strike against food shortage.
  - Museum Ostwall opens.
- 1950 – Population: 507,349.
- 1952 – Westfalenhallen rebuilt.
- 1953 – Dortmund Zoo established.
- 1955 – City co-hosts the 1955 Ice Hockey World Championships.
- 1956 – Population: 607,885.
- 1959
  - Florianturm (TV tower) erected.
  - National Bundesgartenschau (garden show) held in the Westfalenpark.
  - City hosts the 1959 World Table Tennis Championships.
- 1960 – Dortmund Airport opens.
- 1961 – Gesundheitshaus Dortmund built.
- 1963 – Dortmund Stadthaus station opens.
- 1964 – City hosts the 1964 World Figure Skating Championships.
- 1968 – University of Dortmund established.
- 1969 – Sparkassen-Hochhaus hi-rise built.
- 1973
  - Dortmund Sparkassen Chess Meeting begins.
  - Günter Samtlebe becomes mayor.
- 1974 – Westfalenstadion (stadium) opens.
- 1975 – City co-hosts the 1975 Ice Hockey World Championships.
- 1976 – National Rowing Training Centre, Dortmund established.
- 1977 – Eving Selimiye Camii (mosque) established.
- 1978 – WestLB Dortmund built.
- 1980 – City hosts the 1980 World Figure Skating Championships.
- 1983
  - Dortmund University station opens.
  - Vorsorgekasse Hoesch (insurance entity) active.
- 1984 – Dortmund Stadtbahn begins operating.
- 1985
  - Technology Centre Dortmund opens.
  - Spielbank Hohensyburg (casino) built.
- 1987 – Coalmining pit closes, "marking the end of more than 150 years of coalmining in Dortmund".
- 1989 – Dortmund City Hall rebuilt on the Friedensplatz (Dortmund).
- 1990 – Eisengiesser Fountain reconstructed on the Freiherr-vom-Stein-Platz (Dortmund).
- 1991 – Steel company Hoesch AG was bought by Krupp.
- 1992 – Adlerturm Dortmund (tower) reconstructed.
- 1993 – Deutsche Arbeitsschutzausstellung museum established.
- 1999
  - Gerhard Langemeyer becomes mayor.
  - Fritz-Henßler-Berufskolleg (trade school) active.

== 21st century ==
- 2005
  - RWE Tower built.
  - Hoesch-Museum opens.
- 2006 - June: Some of the 2006 FIFA World Cup soccer contest held in Dortmund.
- 2008 - Love Parade held in city.
- 2014
  - Ullrich Sierau becomes mayor.
  - Population: 580,511.
- 2025
  - Omar Kalouti (CDU) becomes mayor.

== See also ==
- Dortmund history
- History of Dortmund
- List of historic sites in Dortmund
- de:Zahlen und Fakten zur Politik in Dortmund (in German) includes list of mayors
- Timelines of other cities in the state of North Rhine-Westphalia:^{(de)} Aachen, Bonn, Cologne, Duisburg, Düsseldorf, Essen, Münster

== Bibliography ==
=== in English ===
- "Dortmund". Chambers's Encyclopaedia. London. 1901. hdl:2027/uc2.ark:/13960/t7br92q5g.
- "Dortmund", Northern Germany (15th ed.), Leipzig: Karl Baedeker, 1910, OCLC 78390379
- "Dortmund" . Encyclopædia Britannica. Vol. 8 (11th ed.). 1910. p. 437.
- Edmund N. Todd (1987). "A Tale of Three Cities: Electrification and the Structure of Choice in the Ruhr, 1886-1900". Social Studies of Science. 17 (3): 387–412. doi:10.1177/030631287017003001. JSTOR 285130. S2CID 145435566. (about Bochum, Dortmund, and Essen)
- G. Hennings & K.R. Kunzmann (1990). "Priority to local economic development: industrial restructuring and local development responses in the Ruhr area - the case of Dortmund". In Walter B. Stöhr (ed.). Global Challenge and Local Response: Initiatives for Economic Regeneration in Contemporary Europe. United Nations University Press. ISBN 978-0-7201-2064-6.
- Trudy Ring, ed. (1995). "Dortmund". Northern Europe. International Dictionary of Historic Places. Fitzroy Dearborn. p. 215+. ISBN 978-1-136-63944-9.

=== in German ===
published in the 19th c.

- Bernhard Thiersch [in German] (1854). Geschichte der Freireichsstadt Dortmund (in German). C.L. Krüger.
- Beiträge zur Geschichte Dortmunds und der Grafschaft Mark [Contributions to the History of Dortmund and the County of Mark] (in German). Historischer Verein für Dortmund und die Grafschaft Mark. 1875. ongoing
- Ferdinand Frensdorff [in German] (1882). Dortmunder Statuten und Urtheile [Dortmund statutes and judgments] (in German). Halle: Verlag der Buchhandlung des Waisenhauses.
- Dortmund. Die Chroniken der deutschen Städte (in German). Vol. 20. Leipzig: S. Hirzel Verlag. 1887 – via HathiTrust.
- Karl von Hegel (1891). "Dortmund". Städte und Gilden der germanischen Völker im Mittelalter (in German). Vol. 2. Leipzig: Duncker & Humblot. hdl:2027/wu.89094689700 – via HathiTrust.
- Albert Ludorff [in German] (1894). Die Bau- und Kunstdenkmäler des Kreises Dortmund-Stadt. Die Bau- und Kunstdenkmäler von Westfalen ;2 (in German). Münster: Verlag Ferdinand Schöningh.
- Hermann Adalbert Daniel [in German] (1895). "Dortmund". Handbuch der Geographie (in German). Vol. 4 (6th ed.). Leipzig: D.R. Reisland. hdl:2027/hvd.32044014078935.
- "Dortmund". Brockhaus' Konversations-Lexikon (in German) (14th ed.). Leipzig: Brockhaus. 1896. p. 456+. hdl:2027/njp.32101064064460.
- Dortmunder Bürgerbuch: Sammlung der Ortsstatuten, Polizei-Verordnungen, Regulative u.s.w. für die Stadt Dortmund (in German). Dortmund: Friedrich Wilhelm Ruhfus. 1898.

published in the 20th-21st c.

- P. Krauss; E. Uetrecht, eds. (1913). "Dortmund". Meyers Deutscher Städteatlas [Meyer's Atlas of German Cities] (in German). Leipzig: Bibliographisches Institut.
- Institute for Comparative Urban History [in German], ed. (1973), Dortmund, Deutscher Städteatlas (in German), vol. 1, ISBN 3891150008
- G. Luntowski and N. Reimann, ed., Dortmund 1100 Jahre Stadtgeschichte, (Dortmund, 1982)
- Gustav Luntowski et al. Geschichte der Stadt Dortmund. Harenberg, Dortmund 1994, ISBN 3-611-00397-2
- Dortmunder Statistik: 100 Jahre Statistisches Amt 1896-1996 (in German). Stadt Dortmund. 1996.
- Hermann Bömer; et al., eds. (2010). Stadtentwicklung in Dortmund seit 1945 [Urban development in Dortmund since 1945] (in German).
