= Altes Rathaus =

Altes Rathaus (German for Old Town Hall) may refer to:

- Altes Rathaus, Vienna, Austria
- Altes Rathaus, Deggendorf, Germany
- Altes Rathaus, Hanover, Germany
- Rathaus (Freiburg im Breisgau), Germany
- Rathaus (Oldenburg), Germany
- Old Town Hall, Halle (Saale), Germany
- Old Town Hall (Leipzig), Germany
- Old Town Hall, Munich, Germany
- Old Town Hall, Szczecin, Poland

== See also ==
- Altes Stadthaus (disambiguation)
