= Dortmund rail freight bypass =

German railway lines

Dortmund freight bypass railway
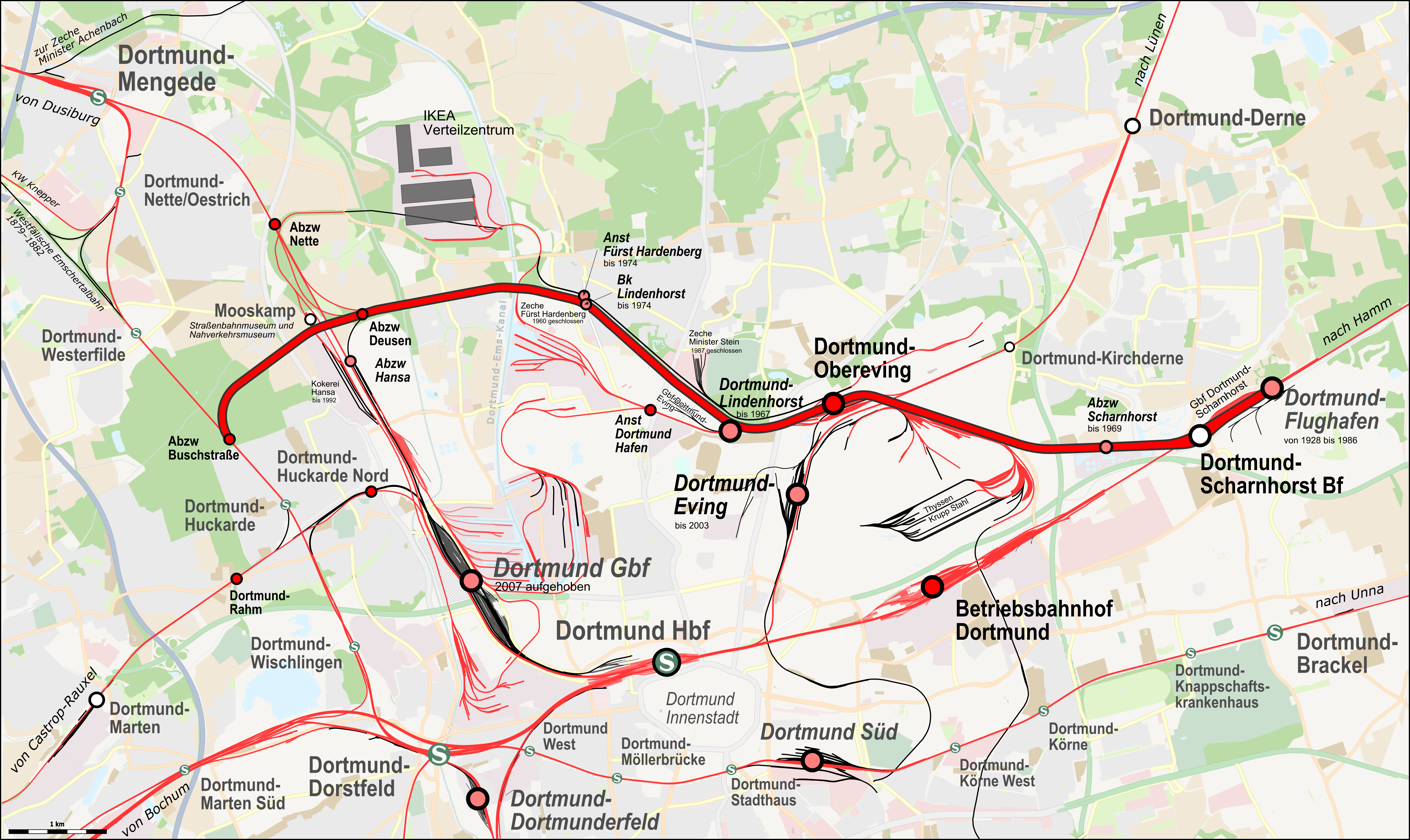

Overview
- Native name: Güterumgehungsbahn Dortmund
- Line number: 2132 (Nette–Scharnhorst); 2123 (Huckarde–Deusen)
- Locale: North Rhine-Westphalia, Germany

Technical
- Line length: 16 km (9.9 mi)
- Electrification: 15 kV/16.7 Hz AC overhead catenary
- Operating speed: 80 km/h (50 mph) (max)

The Dortmund freight bypass railway (German: Güterumgehungsbahn Dortmund) is a railway line in the north of the city of Dortmund in the German state of North Rhine-Westphalia. It is designed for the carriage of freight only, allowing freight trains that pass through Dortmund to avoid Dortmund Hauptbahnhof, reducing delays to passenger traffic and reducing threat of dangerous accidents in the city centre.

== Mengede–Scharnhorst line ==
In 1903, the Prussian state railways opened a line between Mengede and Dortmund-Scharnhorst station, which had two tracks from the start. The route connected at Nette junction to the former trunk line of the Cologne-Minden Railway Company, running from Dortmund Hauptbahnhof to Herne.

At Deusen junction it also formerly connected with the link to the former Dortmund freight yard (Dortmunder Güterbahnhof), which was located just north and parallel with the Duisburg–Dortmund railway and has been disused since 30 June 2004. As described in the following section, it next connects at Buschstraße junction with the former Emscher Valley Railway of the Royal Westphalian Railway Company from Dortmund Bodelschwingh to Dortmund-Huckarde Süd, now used by line S2 of the Rhine-Ruhr S-Bahn.

From there it passes through the rural north of the city of Dortmund, initially through the immediate vicinity of the former Fürst Hardenberg colliery towards Obereving. This is the location of the only freight yard in Dortmund still operated by DB Schenker, which serves as a transfer station for the Dortmund Port Railway (Dortmunder Hafenbahn) and for other transfer operations in the area. The hump at the western end, however, is closed. In the immediate neighbourhood south of it there is a freight yard of the Dortmund Railway (Dortmunder Eisenbahn), which also operates traffic to the Westphalian steel works (Westfalenhütte) and on the port railway. Here a branch connects to the Dortmund–Gronau railway and various branch lines connect the two lines to the port and to Fürst Hardenberg colliery.

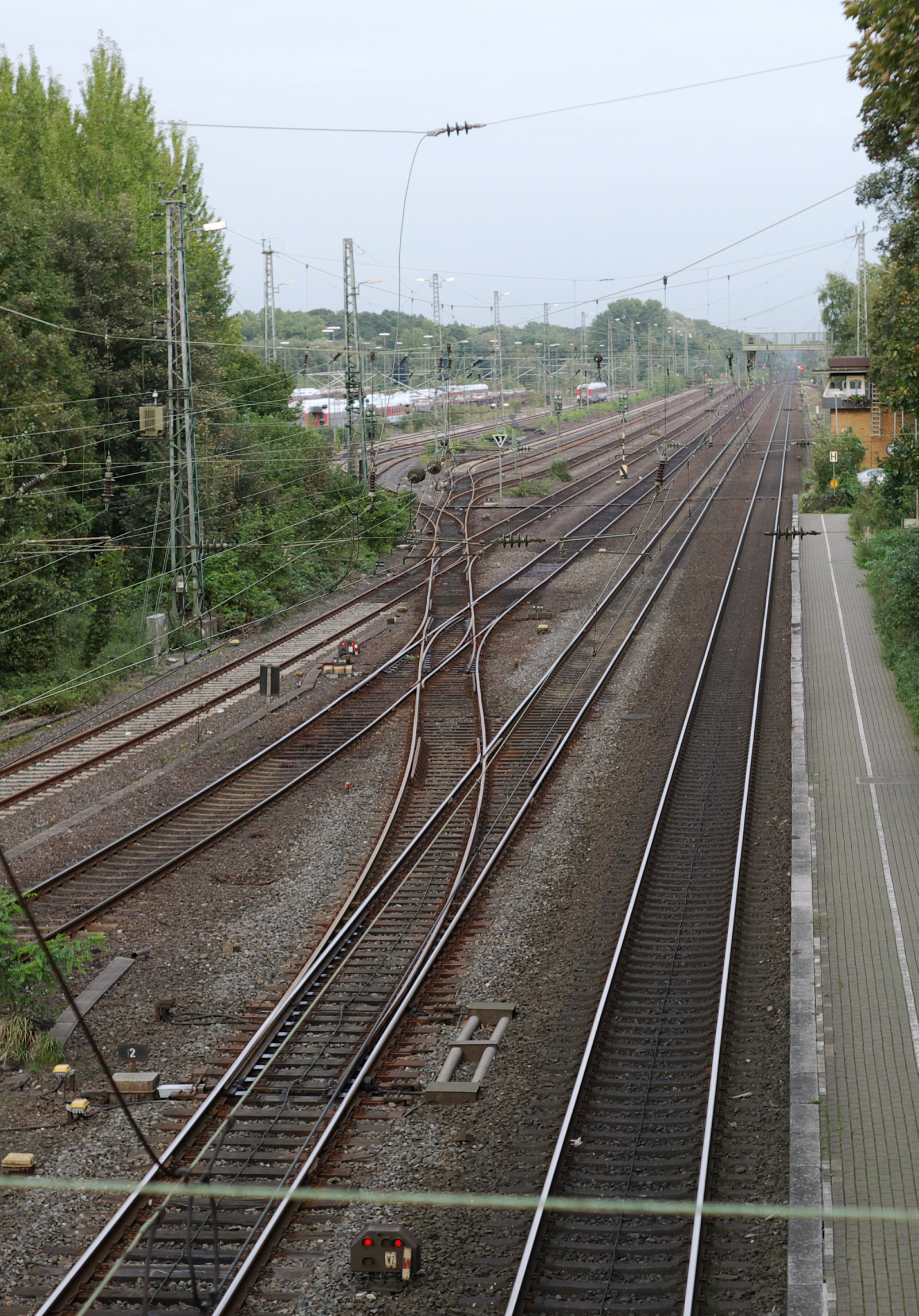
Branching of the freight bypass in Scharnhorst station

The line runs through the premises of Westphalian steel works and on the southern edge of Scharnhorst to reach Dortmund-Scharnhorst station, which was called Bahnhof Dortmund-Flughafen (Dortmund Airport station) from 1928 to 1986 after the nearby airfield in the suburb of Brackel.

The line has been electrified since 1963 (Nette–Obereving) and 1965 (Obereving–Scharnhorst) and it is active to this day for regional and national freight traffic, especially on weekends because of the closure of the Oberhausen-Osterfeld Süd–Hamm railway. It also serves as a detour route for passenger traffic when tracks are closed in the Dortmund Hauptbahnhof area.

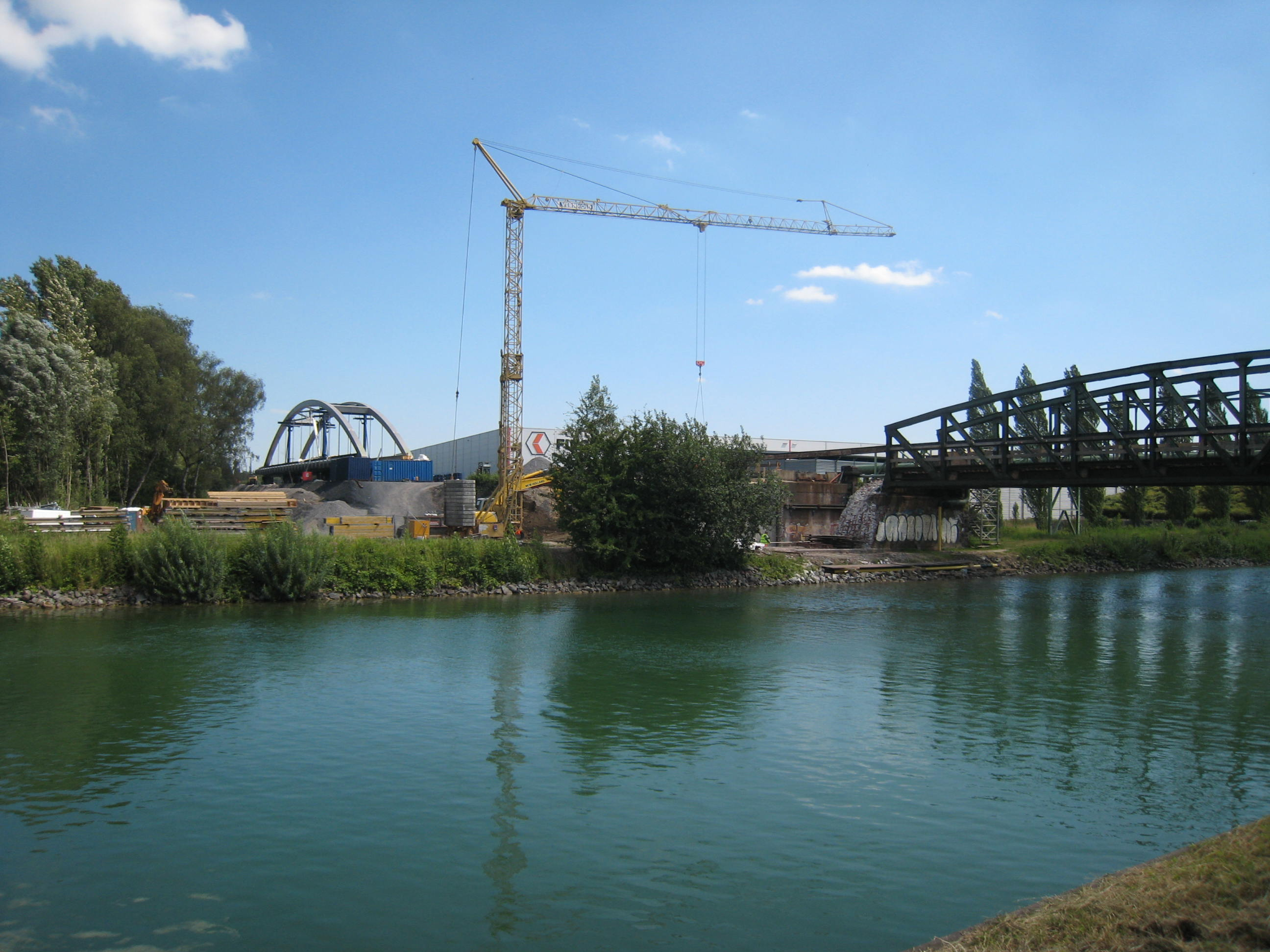
Bridge restoration in July 2008

== Huckarde Süd–Deusen line ==
Only 2.3 kilometres long, the link from Deusen junction to Buschstraße junction is one of the shortest railways in Dortmund. It was built in 1942 to provide a direct extension of the bypass to provide a connection from the important freight yards in the north of the Dortmund urban area to the yards in the southwest of Dortmund.

The direct link was used to connect several lines to the Dortmund-Huckarde Süd freight yard, including the Dortmund Süd–Bodelschwingh railway opened in 1878 by the Royal Westphalian Railway Company and the connection to Rahm on the Duisburg-Ruhrort–Dortmund railway.

In 1965, the stretch from Huckarde Süd to Deusen was electrified, but three years later the two remaining branches to Rahm and Bodelschwingh were closed, causing Buschstraße junction to be closed.

Buschstraße junction was re-established with the conversion of the line from Dortmund-Huckarde to Dortmund-Mengede for the S-Bahn in 1986. However, only one set of points was re-established, so trains from Deusen must run from the junction to Huckarde Süd Railway Station on the left track, opposite the normal direction of travel. Shortly after the junction the line becomes two-track and the rest of the line is duplicated.

About 1.2 km later there is another peculiarity, where the freight line crosses the line U 47 of the Dortmund Stadtbahn at ground level with the two lines are electrified with different current systems. A crossing guard is in charge here on the two lines for ensuring the safety of operations and Stadtbahn services are controlled by signals and also prevented with barriers from crossing the freight line. To avoid interference the overhead wire of the track which is not occupied is removed at the crossing. For a long time there has been consideration of removing this intersection by building an overpass or underpass for the Stadtbahn line, but the construction of such a construction project has not yet been authorised.

After crossing the Emscherallee in the grounds of the former Hansa coking plant, the line reaches Deusen junction on the line from Mengede to Obereving. Despite its electrification, the line does not play a prominent role for freight transport; many trains from or towards Bochum and Witten go via Wanne-Eickel, but only a few trains a day run on this line.
