= Grand Duchy of Berg =

Client state of the French Empire (1806–1813)

Grand Duchy of Berg Grand-duché de Berg (French) Großherzogtum Berg (German)
- 1806–1813
- Flag Coat of arms

- The Grand Duchy of Berg in 1812
- Status: Member state of the Confederation of the Rhine
- Capital: Düsseldorf
- Common languages: German, French
- Religion: Protestant, Catholic
- Government: Constitutional monarchy
- Grand Duke
  - 1806–1808: Joachim I
  - 1808–1809: Napoleon I
  - 1809–1813: Louis I
- Historical era: Napoleonic Wars
  - Established: 15 March 1806
  - Abolition of the Confederation of the Rhine: 1 December 1813

Area
- 1811: 17,300 km^{2} (6,700 sq mi)

Population
- 880,000
Preceded by
Duchy of Berg
Duchy of Cleves
County of Mark
Principality of Münster
Succeeded by
Province of Jülich-Cleves-Berg

The Grand Duchy of Berg (German: Großherzogtum Berg), also known as the Grand Duchy of Berg and Cleves, was a territorial grand duchy established in 1806 by Napoleon after his victory at the Battle of Austerlitz (1805) on territories between the French Empire at the Rhine river and the German Kingdom of Westphalia.

== History ==
The French annexation of the Duchy of Jülich (French: Juliers) during the French Revolutionary wars in 1794 had separated the two duchies of Jülich and Berg, which had been ruled in personal union by the Wittelsbach dukes of Palatinate-Neuburg since 1614 (and before that by the house of La Marck since 1423 see United Duchies of Jülich-Cleves-Berg). In 1803, the heir of Palatinate-Neuburg, the Bavarian elector Maximilian Joseph, separated the remaining Duchy of Berg from his other Bavarian territories and granted it to his cousin William of Palatinate-Zweibrücken-Birkenfeld-Gelnhausen as administrator, whereby it came under the rule of a junior branch of the Wittelsbachs.

In 1806, in the reorganization of Germany occasioned by the dissolution of the Holy Roman Empire, Maximilian I Joseph, now King of Bavaria, ceded Berg to Napoleon in return for the Principality of Ansbach. On 15 March 1806, the French emperor put Berg under the rule of his brother-in-law Joachim Murat, including territories of the former Prussian Duchy of Cleves east of the Rhine river. Murat's arms combined the red lion of Berg with the Cleves arms. The anchor and the batons came to the party due to Murat's position as Grand Admiral and as Marshal of the Empire. As the husband of Napoleon's sister, he also had the right to use the imperial eagle. On 12 July 1806, Murat joined the Confederation of the Rhine and assumed the title of a grand duke. His lands were further enlarged by the annexation of the County of Mark, the Prince-Bishopric of Münster, the Imperial city of Dortmund and numerous minor territories of the Lower Rhenish-Westphalian Circle.

Murat eventually left the grand duchy in 1808 to take up his new title as king of Naples but he kept grand duke in his title. Berg was at first directly ruled by Napoleon in a Personal Union. In 1809, Napoleon appointed his young nephew, Prince Napoleon Louis Bonaparte (1804–1831), the elder son of Napoleon's brother Louis Bonaparte, King of Holland, as Grand Duke of Berg; French bureaucrats under Pierre Louis Roederer administered the territory in his name. For nine days in July 1810, Grand Duke Napoleon Louis also ruled over the Kingdom of Holland in another personal union, but this was short-lived, and French troops moved into the kingdom and incorporated it into France.

The state was in constant economic decline from its formation, in large part due to Napoleon's failed Continental System which led to a series of revolts and uprisings. The grand duchy's short existence came to an end when the French forces pulled back in the course of the German campaign of 1813. The territory was then administered by Prussia, which officially incorporated the former grand duchy according to the Final Act of the 1815 Congress of Vienna. Berg became part of the Province of Jülich-Cleves-Berg, and the eastern territories of Münster and Mark were merged into the Province of Westphalia. Today, the territory is part of modern Germany.

== Coats of arms ==
Coat of arms of the Grand Duchy of Berg (1806–1808)

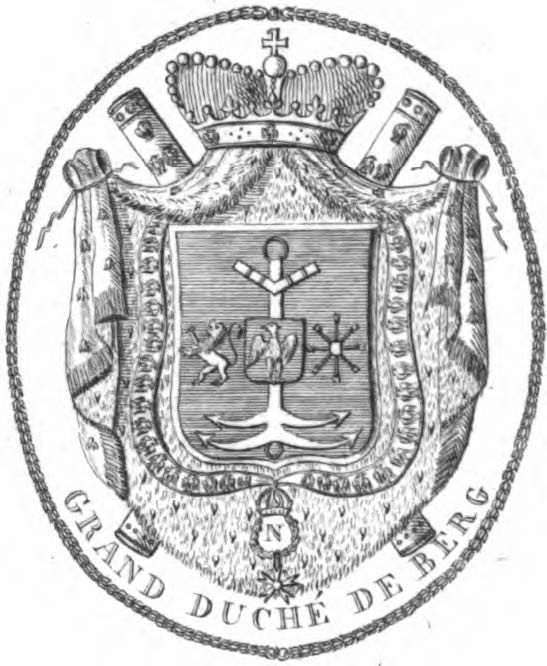
Seal of the Grand Duchy of Berg (1807)

Coat of arms of the Grand Duchy of Berg (1809–1813)

== Departments ==
- Ems
  - Coesfeld
  - Münster
  - Lingen
- Rhine
  - Düsseldorf
  - Elberfeld
  - Essen
  - Mülheim
- Ruhr
  - Dortmund
  - Hagen
  - Hamm
- Sieg
  - Dillenburg
  - Siegen
