= Dortmund-Kurl station =

Railway station in Dortmund, Germany

Dortmund Kurl
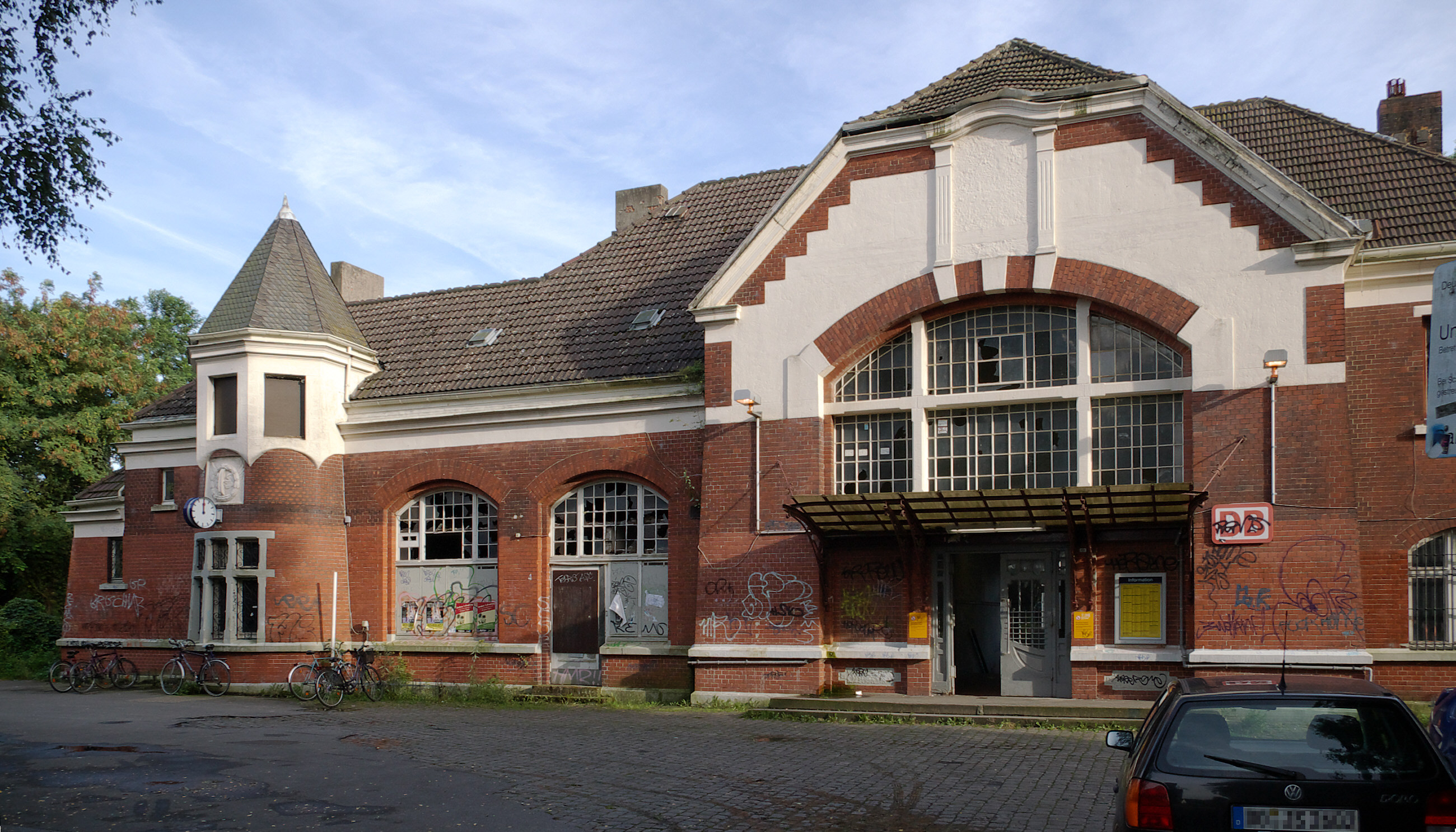

General information
- Location: Mühlacker-Str. Kurl, NRW; Germany
- Coordinates: 51°33′25″N 7°35′6″E
- Owner: DB Netz
- Operator: DB Station&Service
- Line: Dortmund–Hamm
- Platforms: 2

Construction
- Accessible: Yes

Other information
- Station code: 1315
- DS100 code: EDKU
- IBNR: 8001537
- Category: 6
- Fare zone: VRR: 383
- Website: www.bahnhof.de

History
- Opened: 1858/1880

Services
Preceding station	National Express Germany	Following station
Dortmund-Scharnhorst towards Aachen Hbf	RE 1 (NRW-Express)	Kamen-Methler towards Hamm (Westf) Hbf
Preceding station		Following station
Dortmund-Scharnhorst towards Düsseldorf Hbf	RE 3	Kamen-Methler towards Hamm (Westf) Hbf
Location

Dortmund-Kurl station is in the Dortmund suburb of Kurl in the German state of North Rhine-Westphalia on the Dortmund–Hamm line. The station has two platform tracks and an overtaking track for long-distance trains, and also a freight track without platforms which is no longer used.

== History ==
In 1847, Kurl station was opened by the Cologne-Minden Railway Company as a simple halt. Tickets were sold at the nearby Zur Mühle restaurant. The Zeche Kurl (colliery) opened in 1855 had a siding at Kurl station.

In April 1886 the first permanent station building was built, on the south side of the railway line. It is still used, as a residence, as is the former crossing keeper's house. In 1908, a new entrance building was erected on the north side of the tracks, which now only serves as a passageway to the tracks.

The station is listed as a monument by the city of Dortmund.

== Services ==
It is served by the NRW-Express (RE 1) and the Rhein-Emscher-Express (RE 3).

Line	Line name	Route
RE 1	NRW-Express	Hamm (Westf) – Dortmund-Kurl – Dortmund – Bochum – Essen – Duisburg – Düsseldorf – Cologne – Aachen
RE 3	Rhein-Emscher-Express	Hamm – Dortmund-Kurl – Dortmund – Herne – Gelsenkirchen – Oberhausen – Duisburg – Düsseldorf
