= Westfalenpark =

Public park in Dortmund, Germany

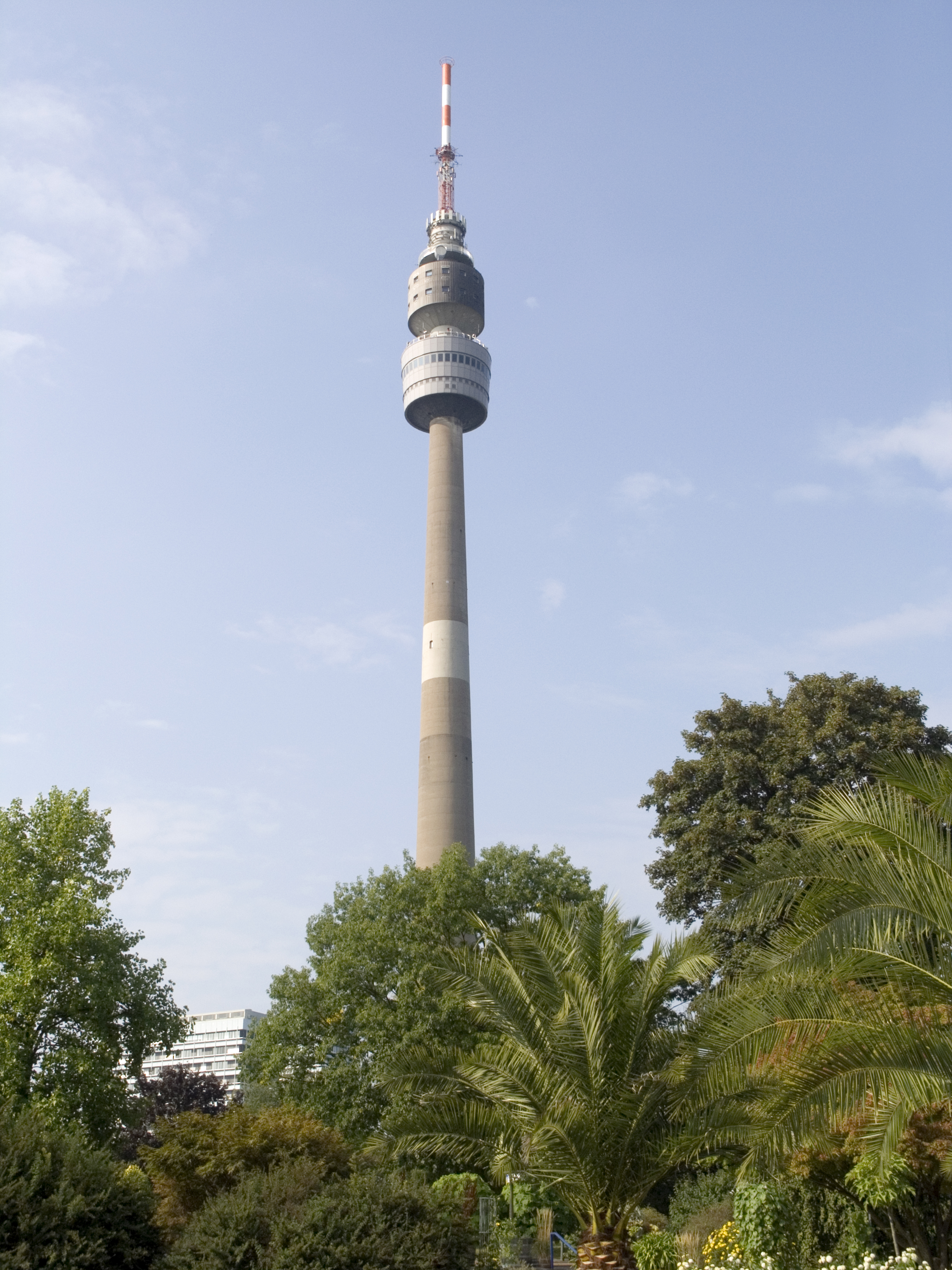
- Florianturm in the Westfalenpark
- Interactive map of Westfalenpark
- Location: Dortmund, Germany
- Coordinates: 51.495°N 7.477°E
- Created: 7 April 1894 (public)
- Operator: City of Dortmund

The Westfalenpark is a large public park in Dortmund, Germany. With an area of 70 ha (170 acres), the park is one of the largest inner-city parks in Europe and is a popular destination for excursions and recreation in North Rhine-Westphalia. The park is situated between the Westfalenstadion, Westfalenhallen, Bundesautobahn 40 and includes the Florianturm. The Emscher valley forms the southern border of the park.

The Westfalenpark Dortmund was opened for the first of the three Bundesgartenschau (a biennial federal horticulture) there (1959, 1969, 1991). On the grounds of the old Kaiser-Wilhelm-Hain, the bushmill park, a waste disposal site and overgrown allotments, a park was created, the centre of which is the Florianturm, at 220 metres the highest German building at the time.

It is home to the German Rosarium, which presents its visitors with more than 3,000 different types of roses, and is the venue for many concerts and regular events, such as the Juicy Beats Festival or the Festival of Lights. Especially popular are the concerts on the lake stage as well as the a cappella festival and flea markets. Many events take place under the awning located in the middle of the park. The 1980s parties or the Ibiza parties were crowd pullers, attracting well over 1,000 visitors.

The awning, designed in 1969 by architect Günter Behnisch, is considered an experimental building of a self-supporting roof construction. After the feasibility of such a ceiling construction was proven here, the construction of the Munich Olympic Stadium followed.

The Westfalenpark was extended by 10 hectares for the Federal Horticultural Show Euroflor 1969. The Rosarium and, in its centre, the Water Heart, a basin whose water level changes periodically, were created on the site.

== Gallery ==
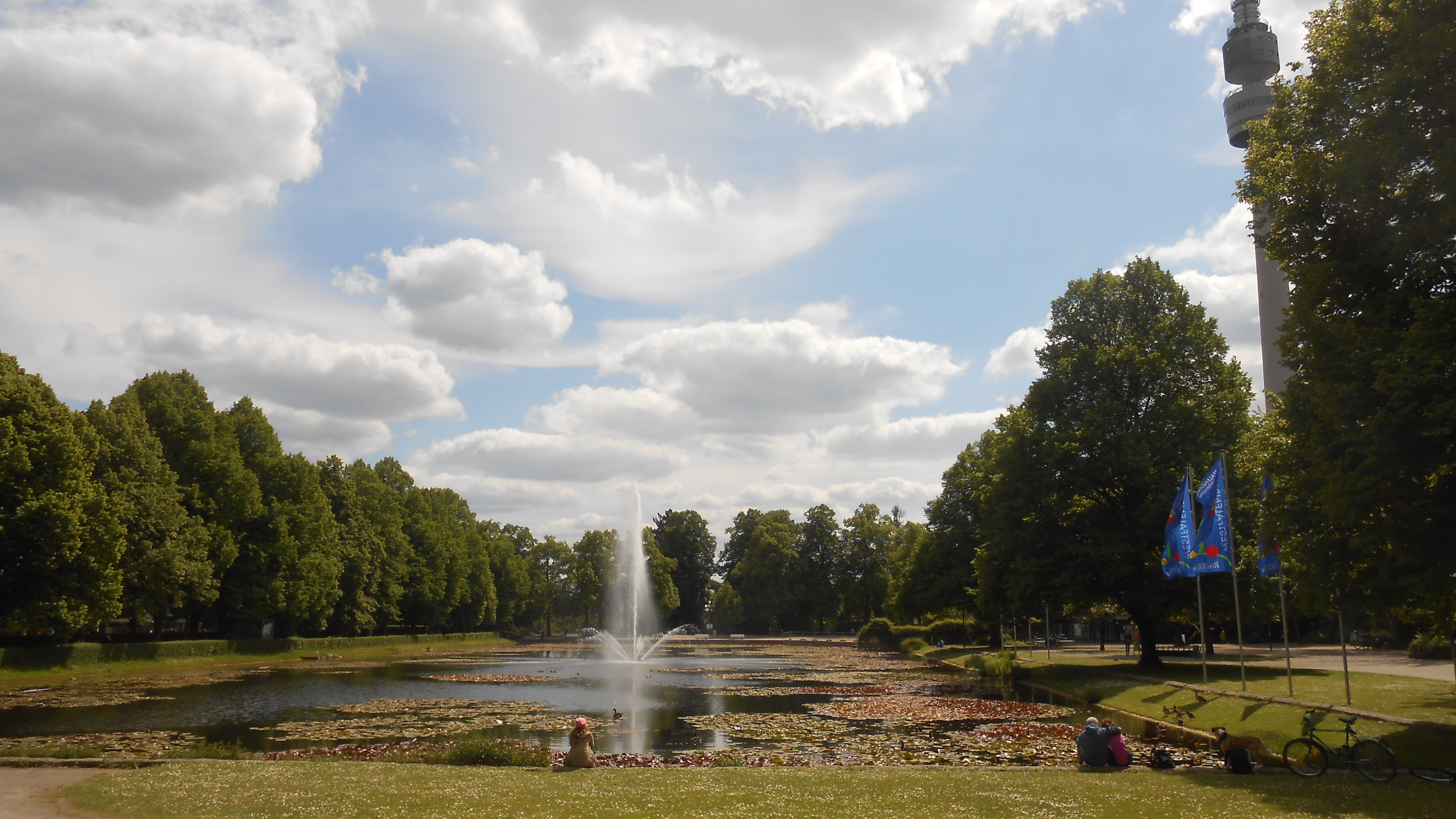
The Kaiserhain pond and the Florianturm

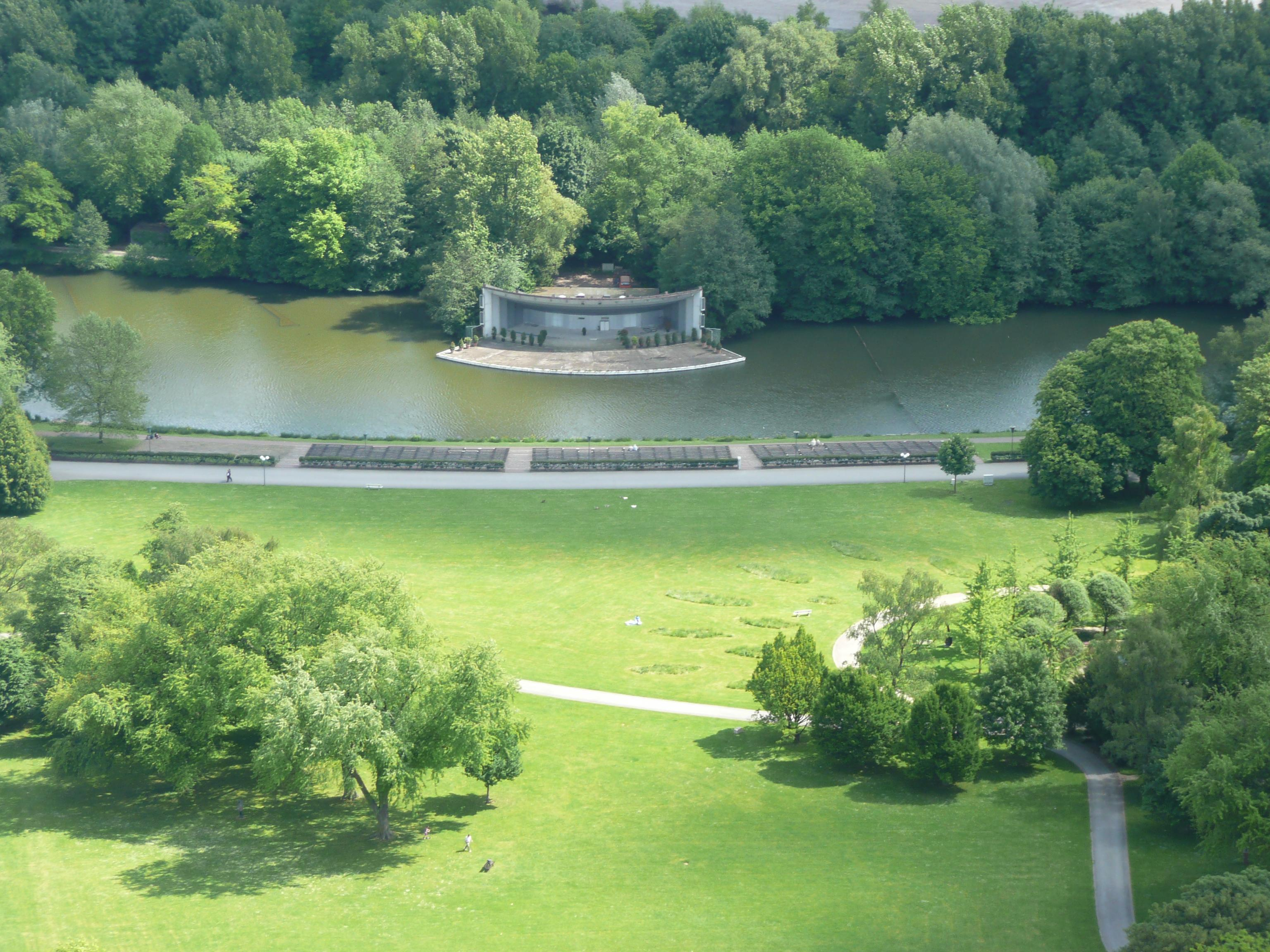
The open air stage in the middle of the Seebühne Buschmühlenteich (The Forest-of-the-mills pond)

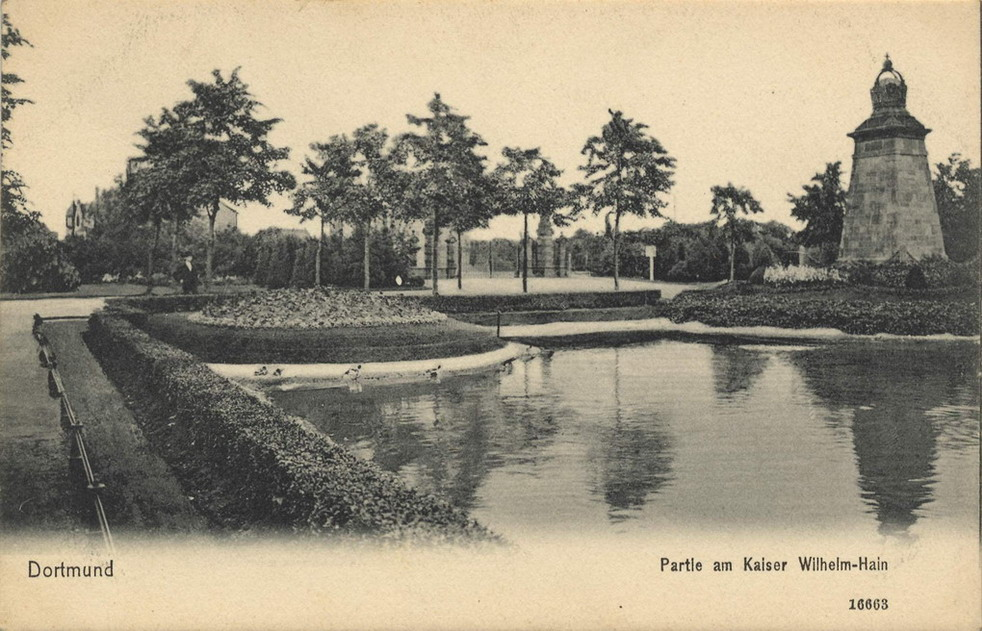
The Kaiser Wilhelm Park (Der Kaiser-Wilhelm-Hain) - the predecessor of today's Westfalenpark

== See also ==
- Bundesgartenschau
- Westfalenstadion
