= Stadion Rote Erde =

Football stadium in Dortmund, Germany

Coordinates: 51°29′33″N 7°27′16″E

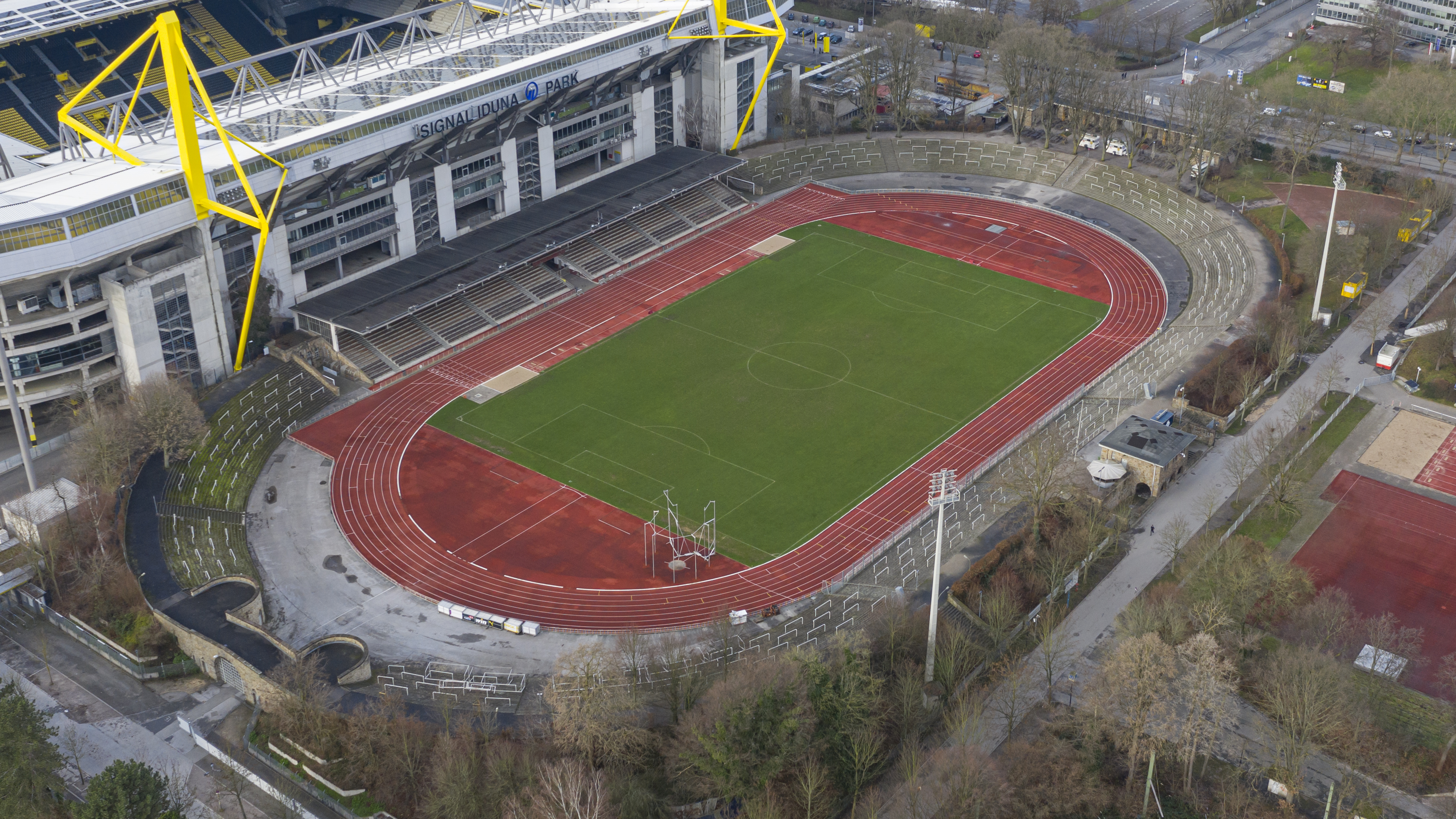
- Interactive map of Stadion Rote Erde
- Full name: Stadion Rote Erde
- Former names: Kampfbahn Rote Erde
- Location: Dortmund, Germany
- Owner: Municipality of Dortmund
- Operator: Municipality of Dortmund
- Capacity: 25,000 (athletics meetings); 9,999 (football matches); 42,000 (1962–1974)
- Surface: Grass
- Scoreboard: None
- Record attendance: 42,000

Construction
- Groundbreaking: 1924
- Built: 1924–1926
- Opened: 6 June 1926
- Renovated: 1976, 2008
- Expanded: 1963
- Cost: 1.8 million German Mark
- Architect: Hans Strobel

Tenants
- Borussia Dortmund (1937–1974); Borussia Dortmund II (1937–present)

Stadion Rote Erde (German pronunciation: [ˌʃtaːdi̯ɔn ˌʁoːtə ˈeːɐ̯də]; Red Earth Stadium) is a 25,000 capacity (3,000 seated) football and athletics stadium in Dortmund, North Rhine-Westphalia. It serves as the home stadium to Borussia Dortmund II and several athletic clubs. The stadium was built in between 1924 and 1926 at a cost of 1.8 million German Mark. The stadium was inaugurated in 1926, with a match between the City of Dortmund and FC Wacker München (1–11).

== History ==
=== Early history (1921 to 1937) ===
The first plans for the stadium date back to 1921, when the Municipality of Dortmund decided to build a Volkspark in the southern area of Dortmund. Architect Hans Strobel designed the park, in which a swimming pool, a multi-functional stadium and the Westfalenhallen would be built. The stadium was built between 1924 and 1926 and was inaugurated in 1926.

On September 4, 1927, the Katholikentag was held in the stadium and in the adjacent Westfalenhallen. This event was organized by the Papal Nuncio to Germany, Eugenio Pacelli, who would later become Pope Pius XII.

In the first decade of the stadium's history, it was mostly used for athletic events. The first official football match in the stadium was in 1929, the quarter-final match of the 1929 German football championship between Borussia Dortmund's rivals Schalke 04 and Hertha BSC, with the latter winning 4–1.

In 1932, the stadium hosted the Deutschen Jugendkraft Sportverband championship match between DJK Sparta Nuremberg and DJK Adler Frintrop, which ended 5–2 to Nuremberg.

=== Home Stadium of Borussia Dortmund (1937 to 1974) ===
Due to the German war effort, the steel and mining company Hoesch AG had to extend her factories in Dortmund. Borussia Dortmund was forced to leave their ground Weisse Wiese and moved to the Stadion Rote Erde in 1937. During World War II, the stadium was heavily damaged and was renovated after the war.

From 1947 to 1967, Borussia Dortmund was one of the most successful clubs in West Germany and the stadium couldn't bear the number of visitors anymore. In 1961, plans were made to expand the stadium, or to build a new stadium on the same location of Stadion Rote Erde. However, due to the economic crisis, the plans were never put in motion.

In 1962, the stadium was expanded by temporary wooden stands, increasing the stadium's capacity to 42,000. In 1971, the Municipality of Dortmund agreed to build a new stadium, directly west of the Stadion Rote Erde. Upon completion of the new Westfalenstadion in 1974, Borussia Dortmund moved into the new stadium.

The wooden structure of the grandstand and roof of the stadium were transported to Hannover after the inauguration of the Westfalenstadion. The roof is installed at the Rudolf-Kalweit-Stadion of SV Arminia Hannover and the grandstand is at Oststadtstadion of OSV Hannover. However, the grandstand at Oststadtstadion was severely damaged by fire in March 2010.

The Stadion Rote Erde has hosted two international matches in its history.

- 8 May 1935: (Nazi Germany) Third Reich – Irish Free State — 3–1
- 8 April 1967: West Germany – Albania — 6–0 (EC 1968 Qualifiers)

In the 1950s, the Stadion Rote Erde also hosted several boxing matches. Between 1950 and 1955, 6 boxing matches took place with over 200,000 spectators. Among them was the Legendary Europe championship bout between Heinz Neuhaus and Hein ten Hoff on 20 July 1952, which ended in a first-round victory for Neuhaus.

In 1990, the Stadion Rote Erde hosted the Deutsches Turnfest (German Gymnastics Festival).

== Current status ==
Nowadays, the Stadium Rote Erde serves as the home stadium for Borussia Dortmund II, providing a capacity for 9,999 spectators. The stadium also serves as an athletics stadium with a capacity of 25,000 spectators. It serves Dortmund clubs such as LG Olympia Dortmund, Dortmund LAC, LC Rapid Dortmund and TuS Westfalia Hombruch as a training and competition venue.

The stadium is part of the Monument List of Dortmund. In December 2008, a major renovation of the stadium, costing 1.65 million Euros, was completed after 14 months of construction.

In the 2009–10 season, when Borussia Dortmund II were playing in the 3. Liga for the first time, the Stadion Rote Erde served as the home stadium of the team, even though it did not meet the requirements of the German Football Association. The floodlights of the stadium gives only a light intensity of 586 lx, while the regulations of 3. Liga requires a light intensity of 800 lx. Despite these regulations, the Stadion Rote Erde continued to serve as Borussia Dortmund II's home stadium after it was promoted again into the 3. Liga in the 2012–13 season.

The stadium came under criticism several times due to inadequate space, lack of soil heating and the poor condition of the infrastructure. Because of this, Borussia Dortmund is considering a purchase of the stadium.

On 8 August 2021, the stadium hosted the first match of Borussia Dortmund women's team, in which they won 3–1 against TSV 1860 Munich. On 14 April 2024, a record attendance of 4,731 spectators witnessed the women's team victory 4–1 against TV Brechten.
