= Altes Stadthaus =

Altes Stadthaus may refer to:

- Altes Stadthaus, Berlin
- Altes Stadthaus, Bonn
- Altes Stadthaus, Dortmund
