= Dortmund-Scharnhorst station =

Railway station in Dortmund, Germany

Dortmund Scharnhorst
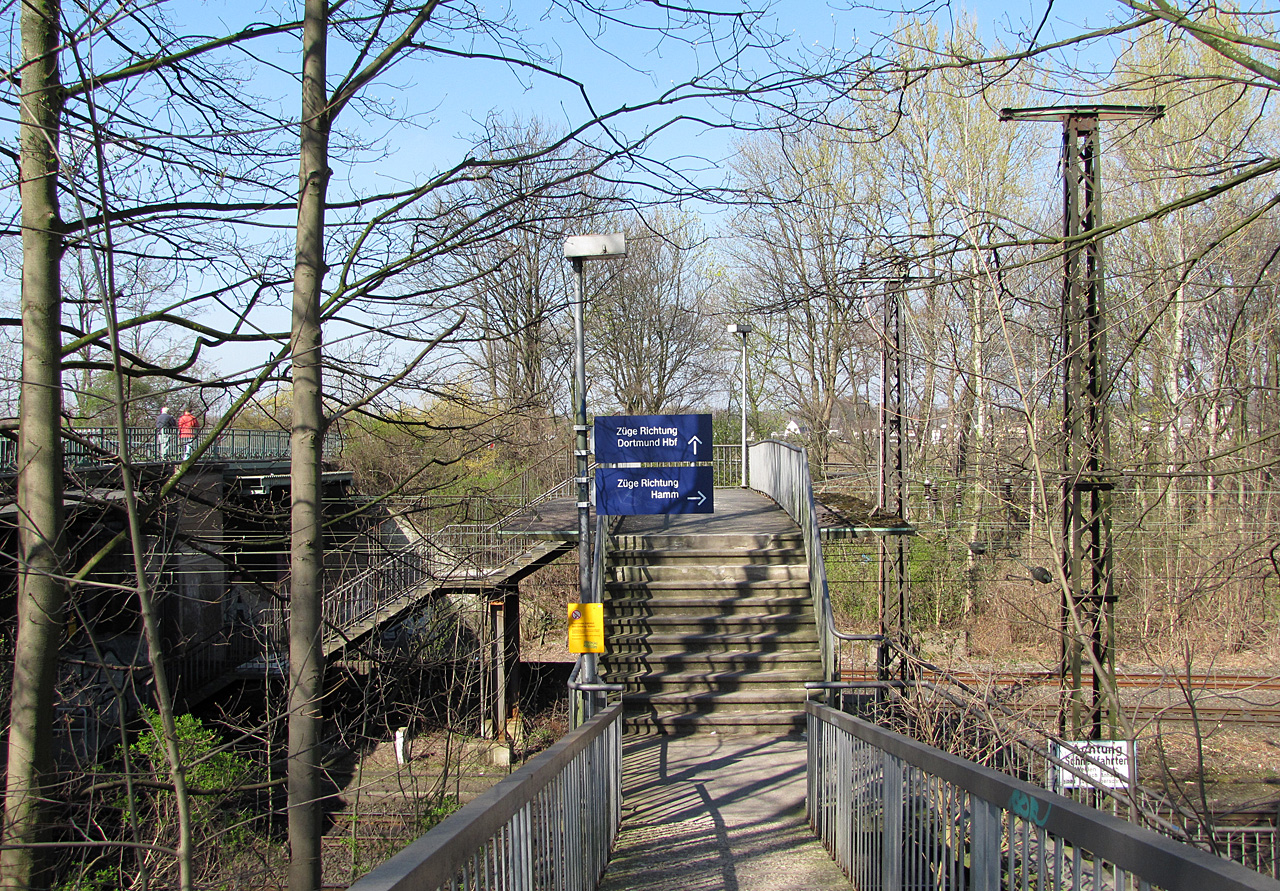
- Eastern access bridge

General information
- Location: Flughafenstr. Dortmund, NRW; Germany
- Coordinates: 51°32′18″N 7°32′13″E
- Owner: DB Netz
- Operator: DB Station&Service
- Line: Dortmund–Hamm
- Platforms: 2
- Train operators: DB Regio NRW eurobahn

Construction
- Accessible: Yes

Other information
- Station code: 1324
- DS100 code: EDSH
- IBNR: 8001515
- Category: 5
- Fare zone: VRR: 382
- Website: www.bahnhof.de

History
- Opened: 1 April 1928

Services
Preceding station	National Express Germany	Following station
Dortmund Hbf towards Aachen Hbf	RE 1 (NRW-Express)	Dortmund-Kurl towards Hamm (Westf) Hbf
Preceding station		Following station
Dortmund Hbf towards Düsseldorf Hbf	RE 3	Dortmund-Kurl towards Hamm (Westf) Hbf
Location
- Location within North Rhine-Westphalia

Dortmund-Scharnhorst station is located between the Dortmund suburbs of Alt-Scharnhorst and Brackel in the German state of North Rhine-Westphalia on the Dortmund–Hamm line on Flughafenstraße.

== History ==
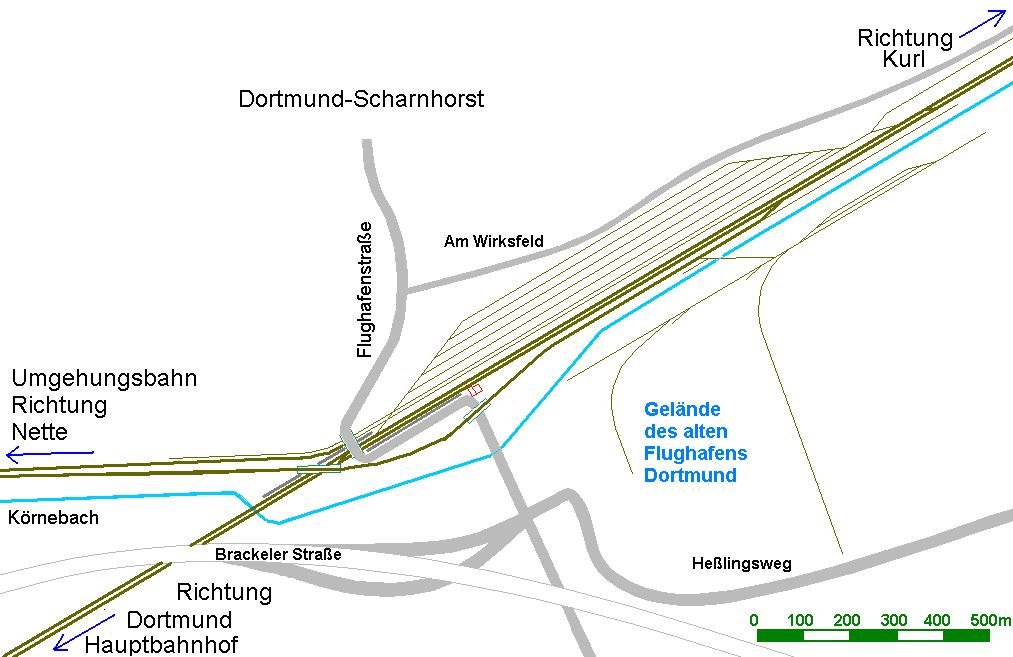
Scharnhorst station track plan (as of 2005 - sidings shown are schematic)

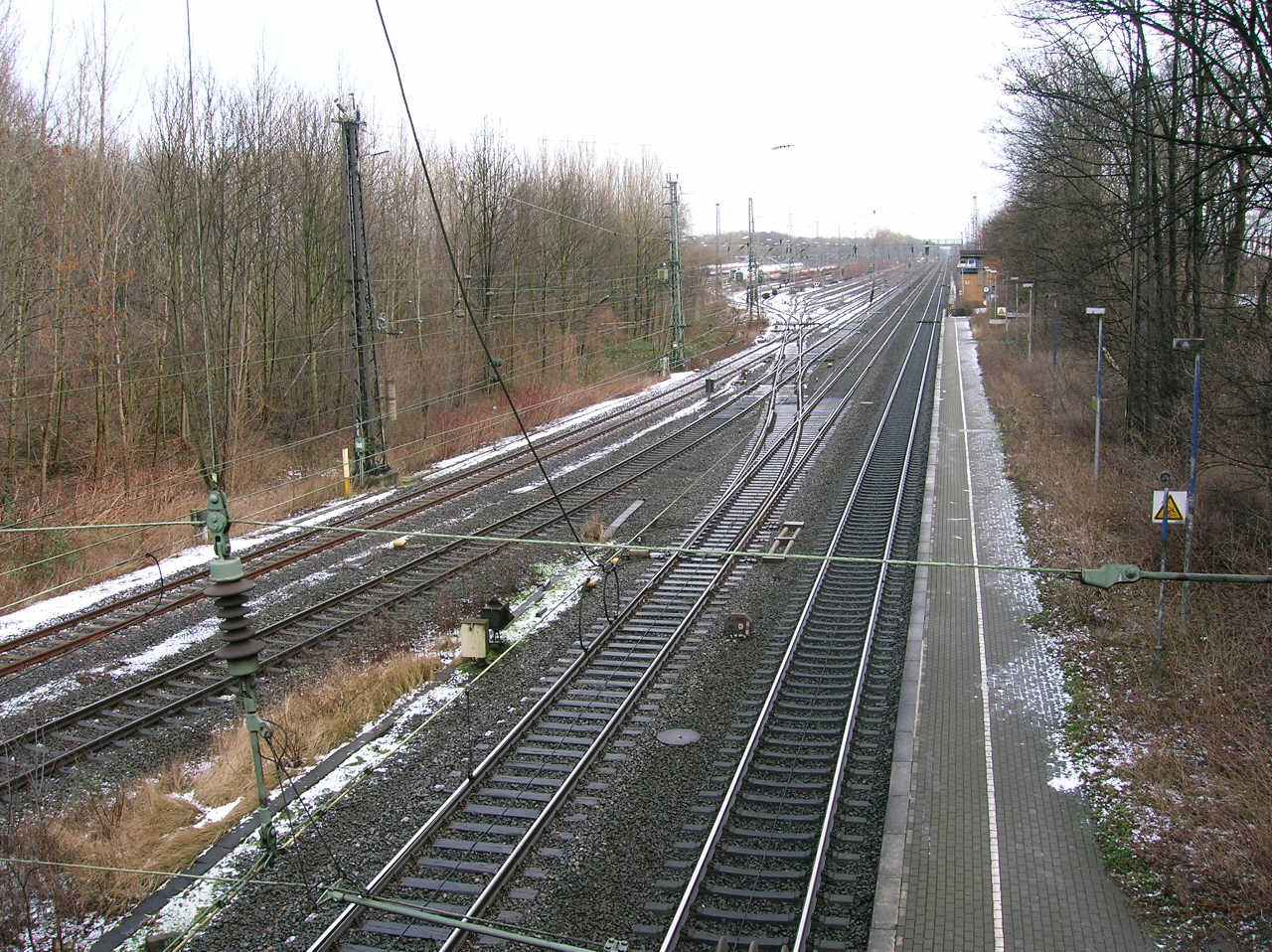
Scharnhorst station in January 2007

During the construction of Dortmund Hauptbahnhof a freight rail bypass was built between Scharnhorst and Nette in 1903 along with the Scharnhorst marshalling yard, where a passenger station was initially established for railway staff. On 6 May 1926, the station became available for normal passenger services following the construction of the first Dortmund airport nearby and the station was renamed Bahnhof Dortmund-Flughafen (Dortmund Airport station). Although the airport closed in 1959, the station retained the name until 31 May 1986. During the construction of the station a small station building was also built with a waiting room, a ticket counter, baggage storage and a bike shed.

== Station ==
Today the station has no station building anymore; in its place there is the Dortmund-Scharnhorst signal box. The two platforms are connected by an old steel bridge running parallel to the road bridge. At the western end of the station another and more modern pedestrian and cycle bridge also connects the two platforms together.

== Services ==
Dortmund-Scharnhorst station is served by the NRW-Express (RE 1, every second hour) and the Rhein-Emscher-Express (RE 3).

Line	Line name	Route
RE 1	NRW-Express	Hamm (Westf) – Dortmund-Scharnhorst – Dortmund – Bochum – Essen – Duisburg – Düsseldorf – Cologne – Aachen
RE 3	Rhein-Emscher-Express	Hamm – Dortmund-Scharnhorst – Dortmund – Herne – Gelsenkirchen – Oberhausen – Duisburg – Düsseldorf

The station is also served by bus route 420 (Scharnhorst – Derne + Brackel – Aplerbeck), operated by Dortmunder Stadtwerke (DSW21) at 20-minute intervals.
