= Old Town Hall, Halle (Saale) =

Coordinates: 51.482379°N 11.97116°E

Old Town Hall and Waage building in Halle (Saale) - engraving, 1749

The Old Town Hall (German: Altes Rathaus Halle) was a town hall in Halle (Saale), Germany.

== History ==
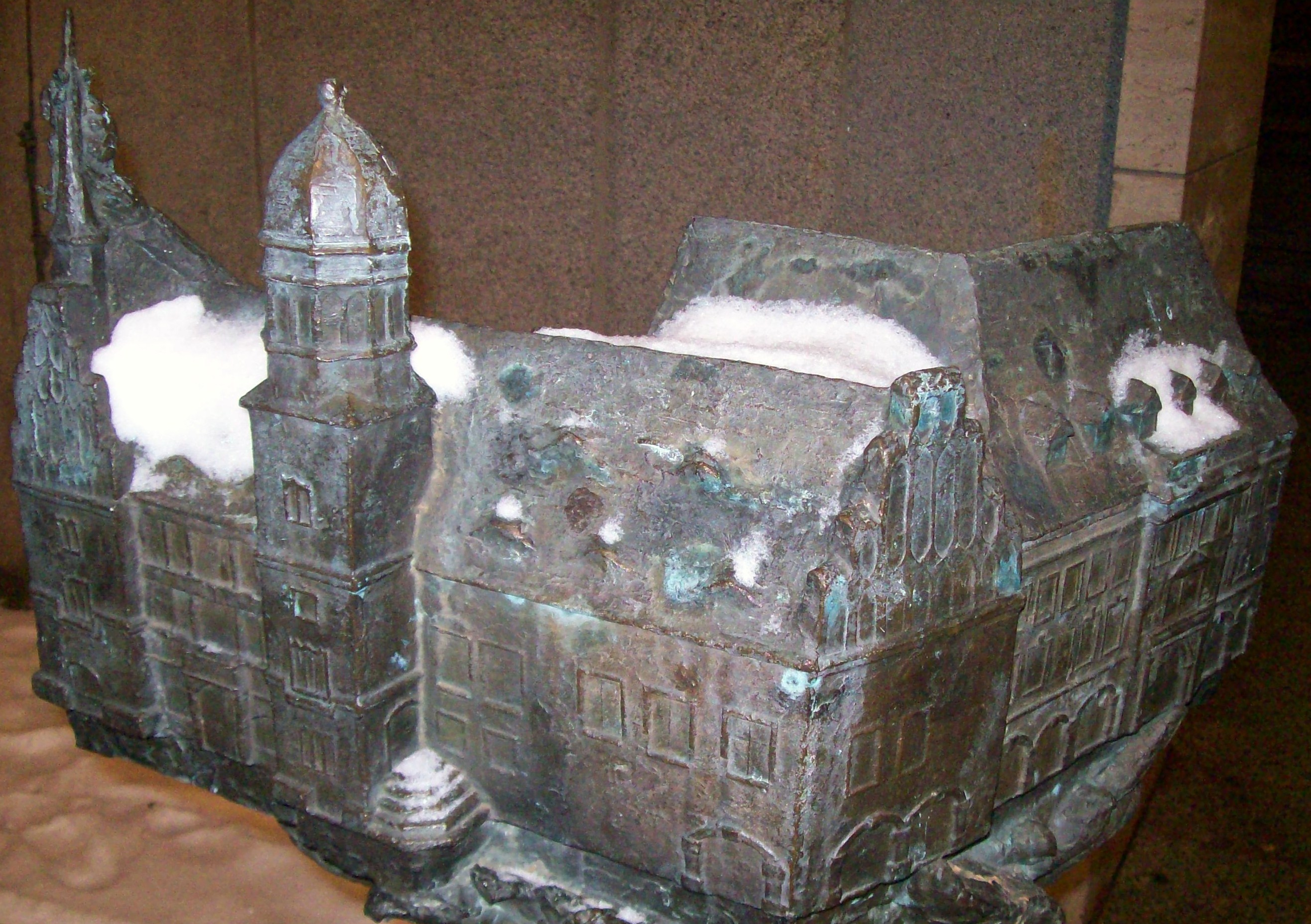
Bronze sculpture Old Town Hall

As early as 1312 a half-timbered Town Hall (German: Altes Rathaus) had been built on the market square in Halle (Saale) on the Saale River, east-central Germany. In 1466 a stone building was constructed. Later on the Town Hall was subject to several transformations. The architect Nickel Hoffmann added Renaissance features to the Gothic architecture style building. The south wing of the Town Hall, dating from the 16th century, was substituted by the Baroque wing in 1702, decorated by a grand entrance portal. On 31 March 1945 an air raid damaged parts of Halle (Saale)’s Old Town Hall and of the Old Weighing House (German: Alte Waage or Ratswaage). These buildings with their variety of architectural styles were demolished. The site of the Old Town Hall is now an unbuilt area with the foundation walls beneath.

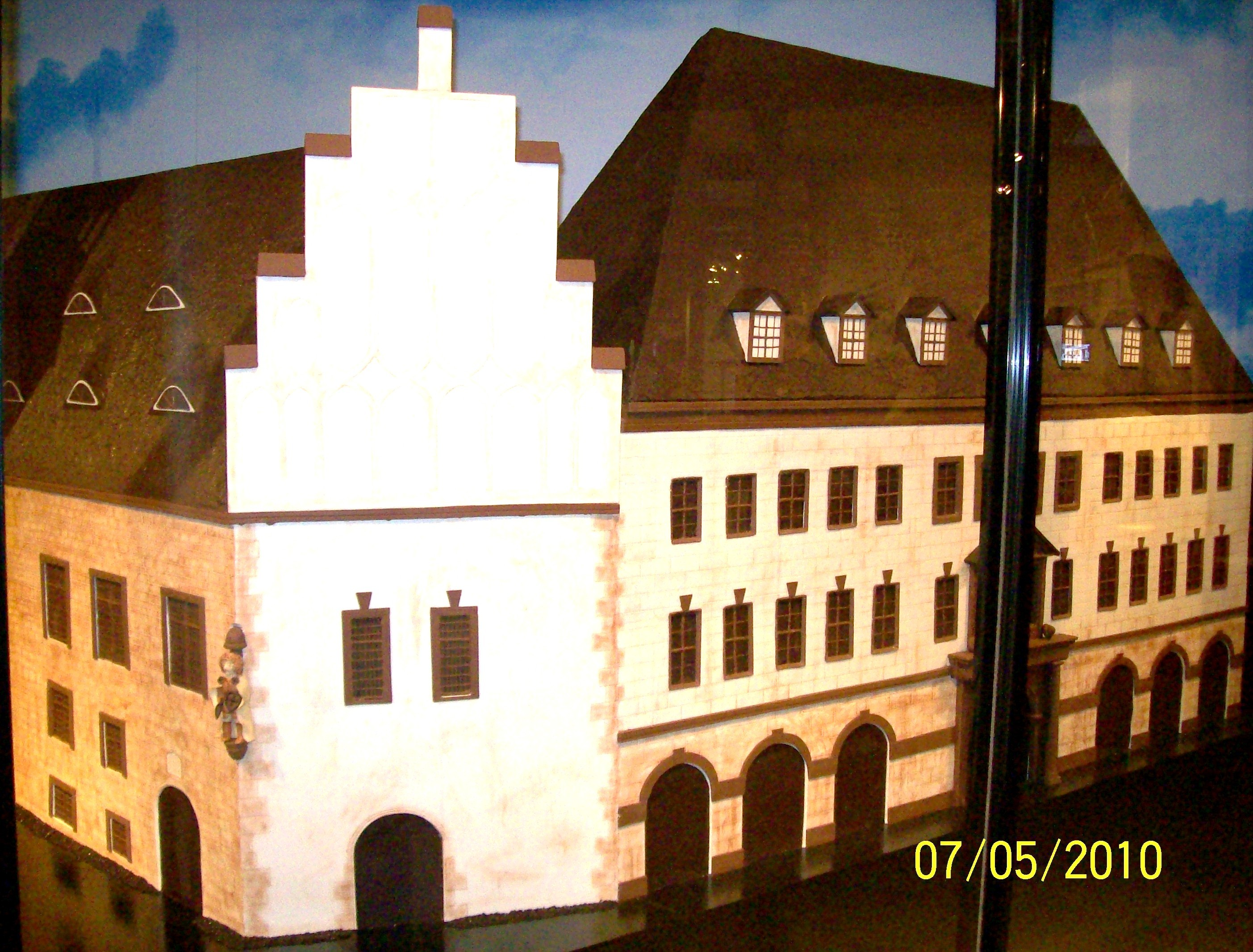
chocolate Town Hall, 2010

Since 2001 a free-standing bronze sculpture of the Old Town Hall, created by Cathleen Meier, has commemorated this building. This piece of art, financed entirely by donations, is situated on the former location of the Baroque wing in front of the City Council Building (German: Ratshof) which used to be the Old Town Hall’s rear building. In 2006 the triptych “The Council’s Loggia” (German: Ratsloggia) produced by Maya Graber and funded publicly, was unveiled at the historic site of this loggia. The latest tribute to this remarkable municipal building is a huge chocolate Town Hall shown in the museum of Halle (Saale)’s Halloren Chocolate Factory (German: Halloren Schokoladenfabrik AG).

== Importance ==
The Old Town Hall was situated on the east side of the market square, facing Halle (Saale)’s landmark, i.e. the Red Tower and the four steeples of the Market Church where the composer George Frideric Handel was baptized. In the background of the memorial to G. F. Handel, the Old Town Hall and the Old Weighing House, which served as Halle’s first university main building, formed a picturesque architectural ensemble and made a major contribution to the appreciation of Halle (Saale)’s market square.

== Prospects for the future ==
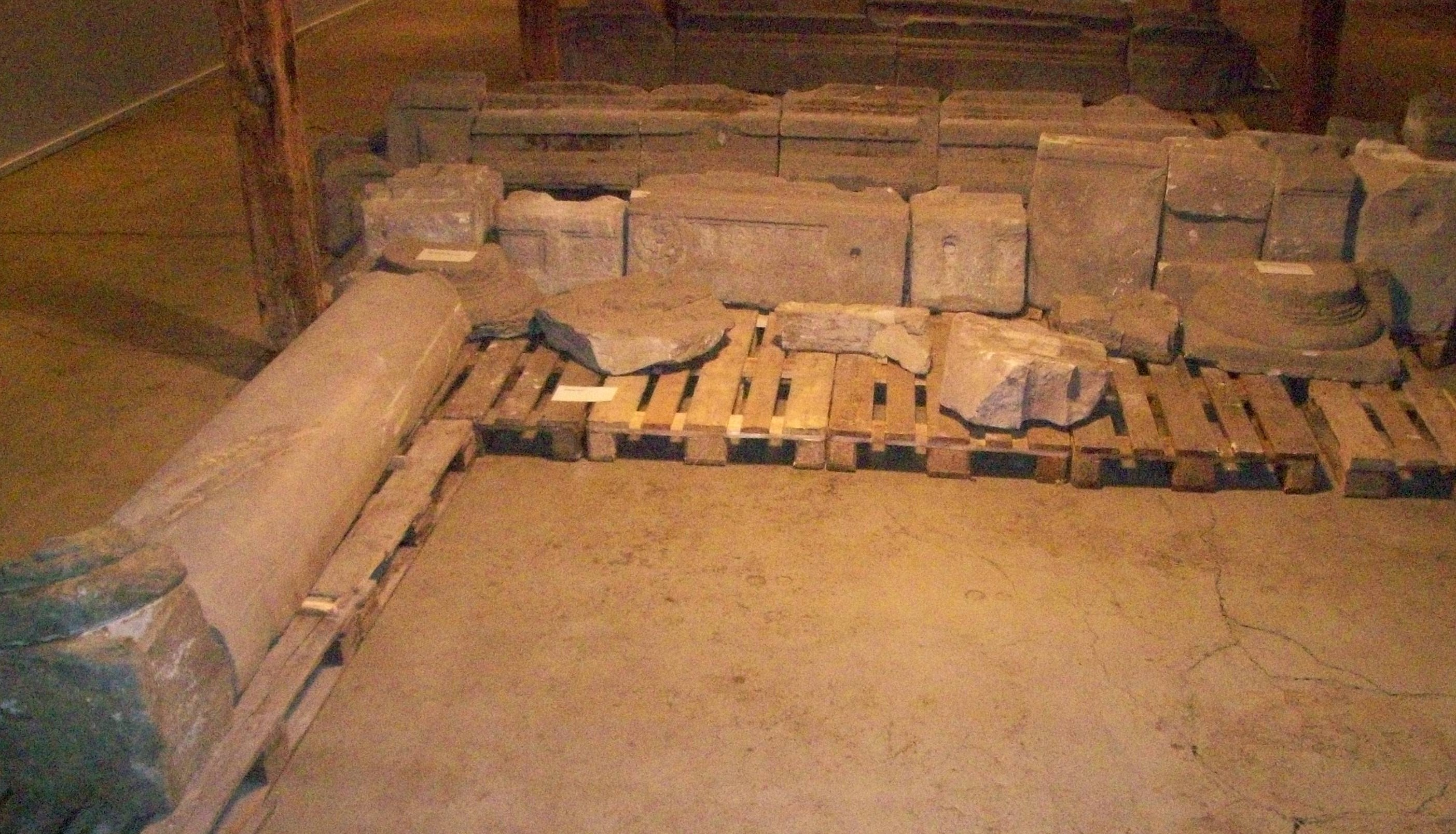
Baroque portal elements of the Old Town Hall

The former magnificence of the architectural ensemble Old Town Hall and Old Weighing House is not forgotten. In order to raise funds for the reconstruction of the historic Town Hall, the non-profit organization Bürgerinitiative Historische Rathausseite Halle (Saale) e.V. was founded. In 2016 the Old Town Hall Foundation (German: Stiftung Altes Rathaus Halle (Saale)) was established by the above mentioned non-profit organization to raise money for the restoration and completion of building elements. Amongst others, donation certificates (German: Stifterbriefe) are issued for this purpose and for the faithful reproduction of decorative elements of the façade.
