= Westfalenhütte =

German industrial site

Coordinates: 51.5303°N 7.4997°E

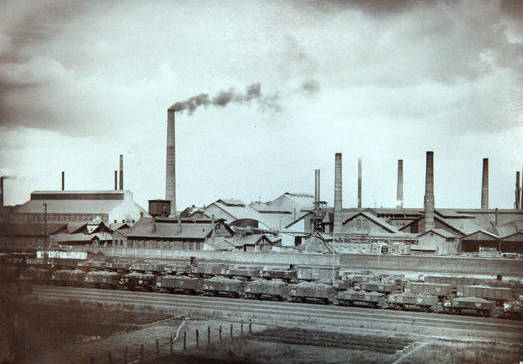
The Westfalenhütte around 1895

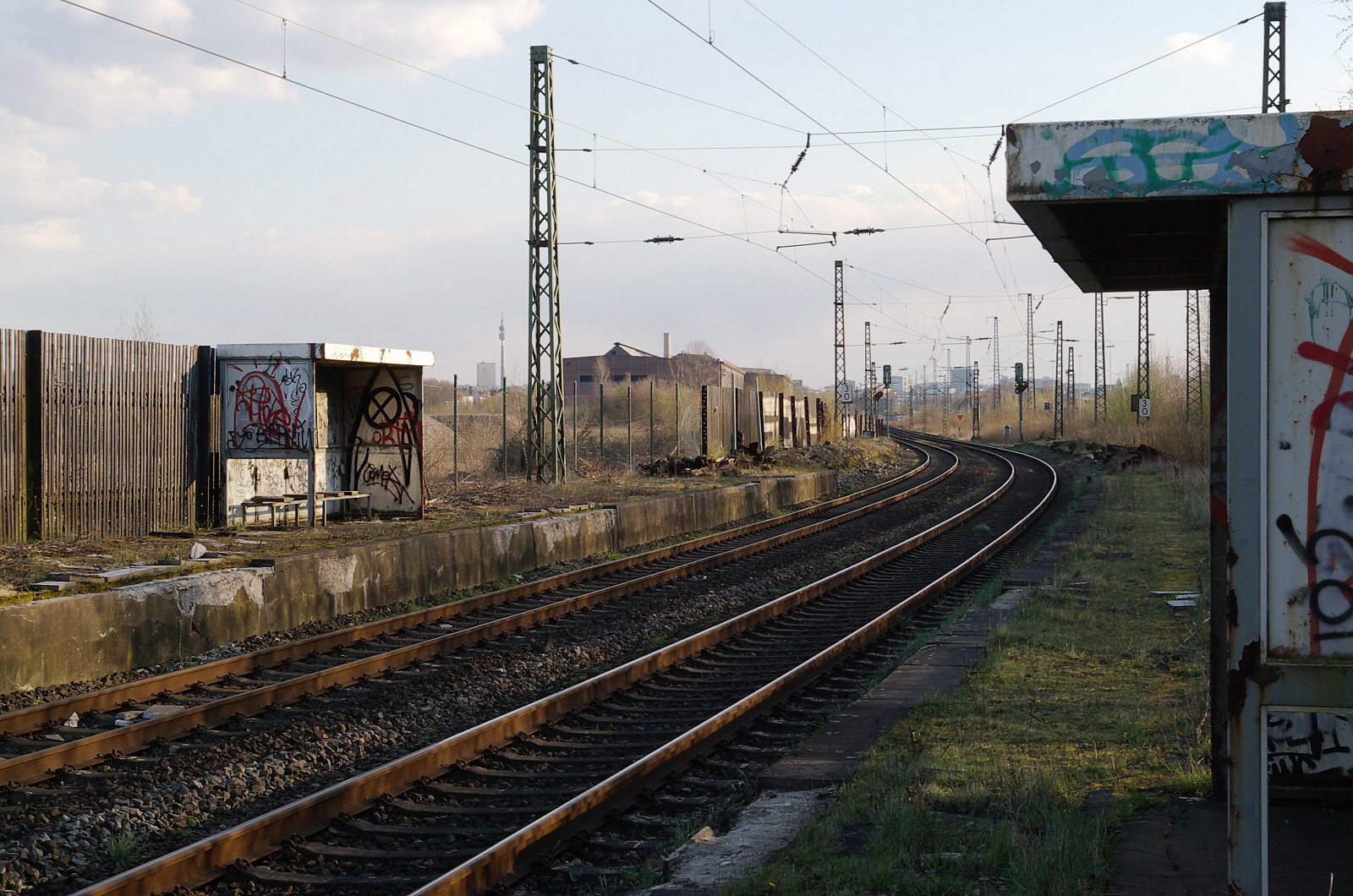
Station Dortmund-Hoesch

The Westfalenhütte is an industrial site in the northeast of Dortmund, Germany. It was established by the steel company Hoesch AG in 1871. At the peak of the so-called Wirtschaftswunder approximately 25,000 people were working there. Following changes in the steel industry and a consolidation process in the sector, activities on the Westfalenhütte were reduced to a few, economically sustainable core areas. Today more than 1,000 people are working on the site of the Westfalenhütte.

The Westfalenhütte stretches over approximately five kilometers from east to west, and nearly four kilometers from north to south. The territory is now owned by the ThyssenKrupp AG and is the largest abandoned industrial area in Europe.

Soviet leader Mikhail Gorbachev visited the Westfalenhütte in 1989 and spoke in front of 8,500 steel workers. The Westfalenhütte had its own railway stop, called Dortmund-Hoesch, which was in use until 1992. A light rail station from the U44 line is still called Westfalenhütte. The Hoeschpark, a recreational area for industrial workers of the Hoesch AG, was established in 1937 on the site of the Weisse Wiese, the first home stadium of football club Borussia Dortmund.

Since the closure of most steelmaking operations, parts of the Westfalenhütte have been redeveloped. The largest project is the Karlsquartier, a mixed-use district with housing, public facilities, and green spaces, marking the site's transition from heavy industry to urban development, with the project planned for completion by 2030.
