= Dortberghaus =

Architectural structure

Coordinates: 51°30′57″N 7°27′37″E

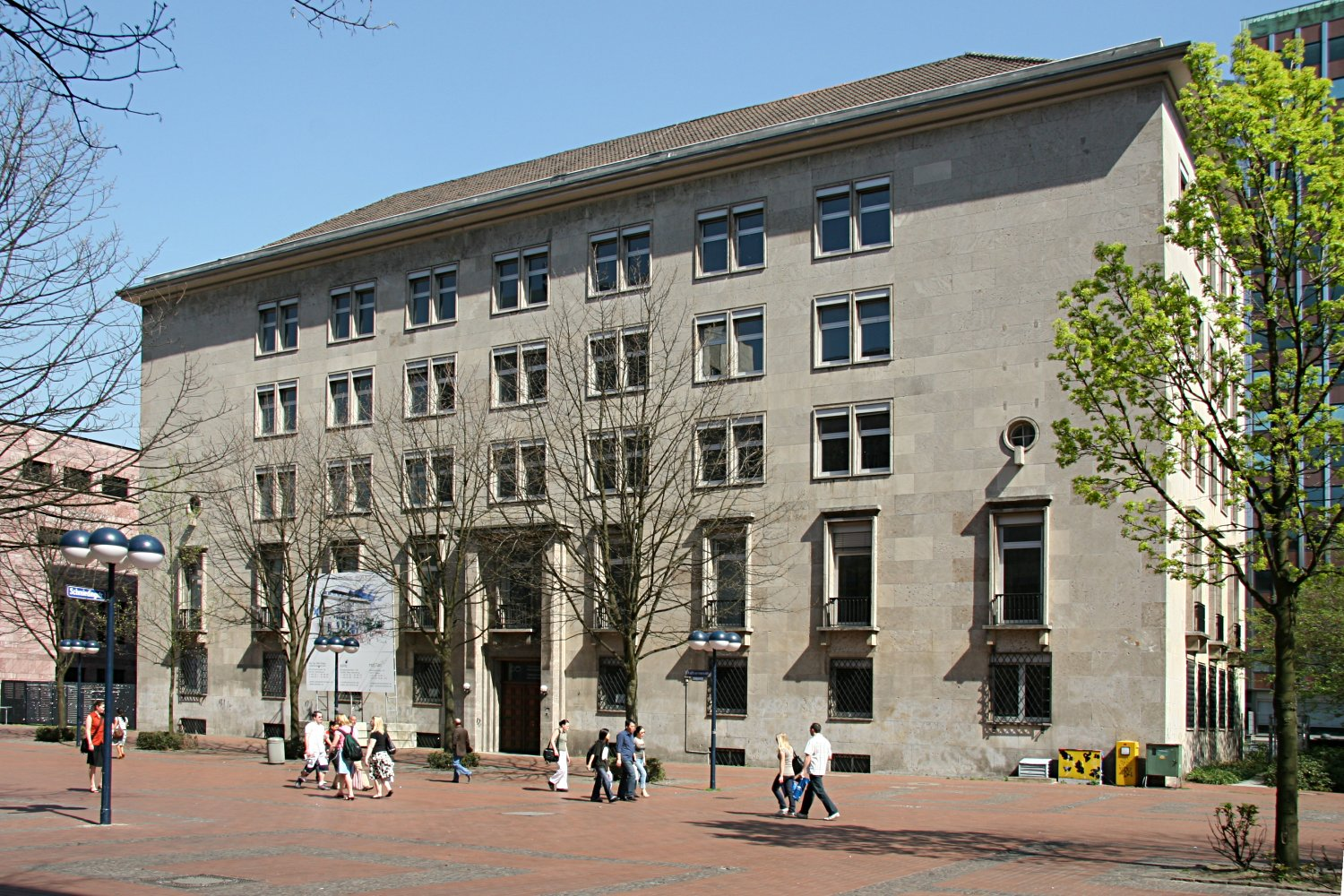
Dortberghaus

Dortberghaus is a listed building in the Dortmund city center.

The Dortberghaus emerged in the years 1937-1938 after the plans of the Cologne architect Emil Rudolf Mewes as an administrative building of the Gelsenkirchen Mining-AG. The building is close to the Dortmund main train station.

The Gelsenkirchen mine-AG wrote in 1936 opened an architectural competition for the construction of the building; Emil Rudolf Mewes won. By the beginning of the Second World War it was planned as a U-shaped building but not fully completed.

After World War II, the building was constructed and used by the Dortmund City Council .

In 2004 the building was vacated by the City Council. There are plans to turn it into a luxury hotel.
