= Ruhr (department) =

Former department of the Grand Duchy of Berg

Ruhr is the name of a département of the Grand Duchy of Berg, a satellite state of the First French Empire, in present day Germany. It was named after the river Ruhr, which flows through the département.

The capital was Dortmund.
