= Weiße Wiese =

Stadium in Dortmund, Germany

Coordinates: 51°31′32.9″N 7°29′14.6″E

Borussia Sportpark Weiße Wiese
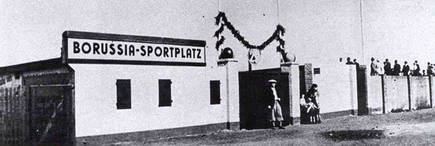
- Weiße Wiese
- Interactive map of Borussia Sportpark; Weiße Wiese
- Full name: Borussia Sportpark
- Former names: Weiße Wiese
- Location: Dortmund, Germany
- Owner: Municipality of Dortmund, Borussia Dortmund
- Operator: Municipality of Dortmund, Borussia Dortmund
- Capacity: 18,000
- Surface: Grass

Construction
- Opened: 14 August 1924
- Closed: 1937
- Demolished: 1937
- Cost: 50,000 Reichsmark

Tenant
- Borussia Dortmund (1924–1937)

Weiße Wiese (The White Field), also known as Borussia Sportpark, was the first home stadium of Borussia Dortmund. It was located at Wambeler street near the Borsigplatz and factory of Hoesch AG in northern Dortmund.

== History ==
=== Weiße Wiese (before 1924) ===
Weiße Wiese was originally a municipal ball court with running tracks and jumping pit. The goalposts and crossbar were initially only made of squared timber and were always removed after the games, preventing the risk that they could be stolen. The name of the place, Weiße Wiese, was supposedly originated from the white flowers dropping from adjacent poplars in spring, which turned the pitch into a white field (German: Weiße Wiese).

=== Borussia Sportspark (1924-1937) ===
As the field did not satisfy the association rules to promote into the Bezirksliga, the field underwent an extensive construction in Summer 1924. The construction consisted of a 450 meter long and 1.8 meters high wall, the building of the changing rooms and ticket booth, as well as a grandstand in the foreground, expanding the stadium capacity to 18,000. The total cost of the construction amounted to 50,000 Reichsmarks. The new Borussia Sportpark was inaugurated by Lord Mayor Eichoff on 14 August 1924.

=== Closure (1937) ===
In 1937, in the preparations for war of Nazi expansion, Hoesch AG forced Borussia Dortmund to leave Weiße Wiese and relocate to Stadion Rote Erde, south of downtown. The sports field eventually gave way to a swimming pool at the newly built Hoeschpark, which, however, was not built until 1951 as Stockheide Swimming Pool. A commemorative plaque was erected there for the historic location.
