= Altes Stadthaus, Dortmund =

German office block built in 1899

Coordinates: 51°30′40″N 7°28′2″E

Altes Stadthaus
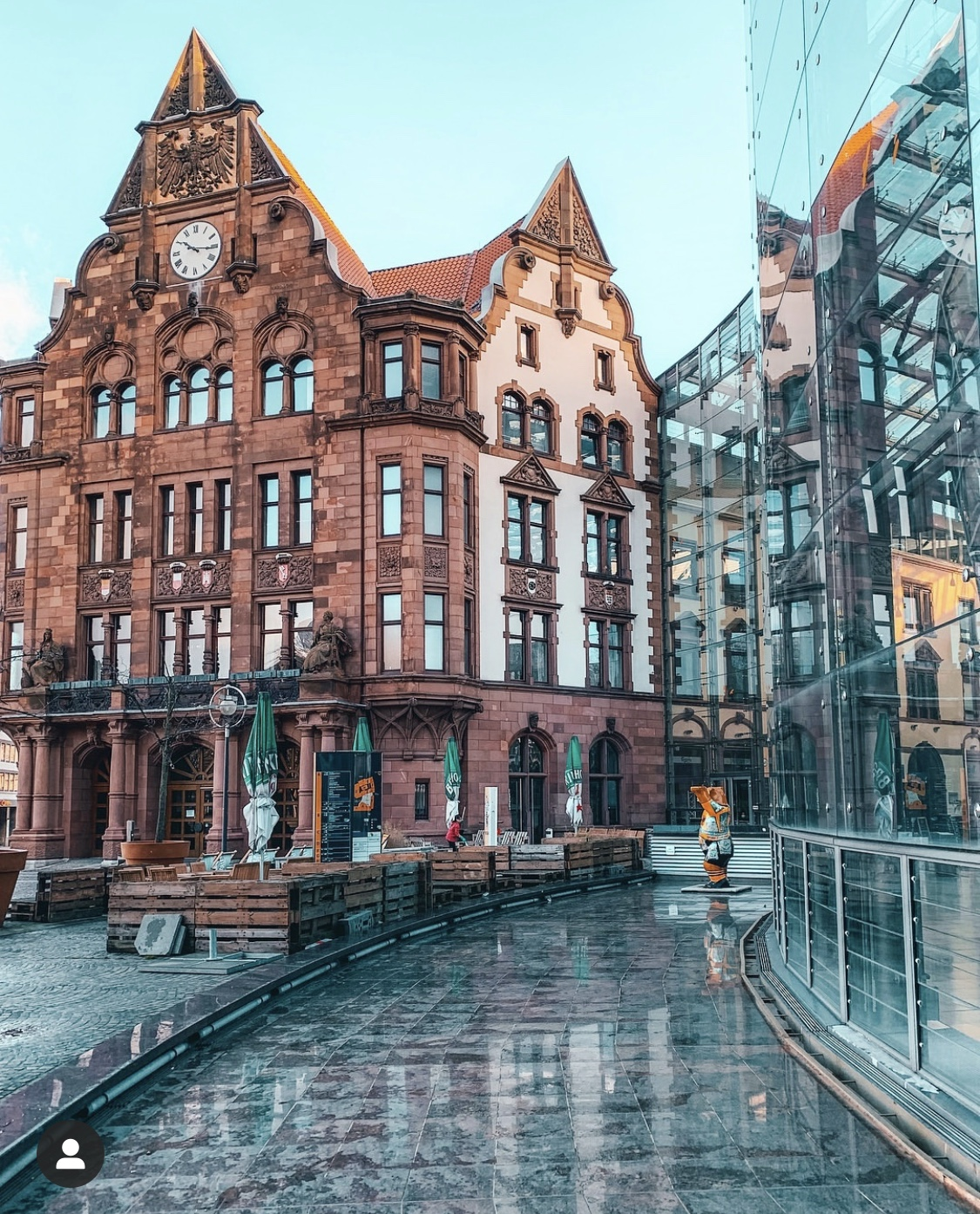
- Interactive map of the Altes Stadthaus area

General information
- Location: Dortmund, North Rhine-Westphalia, Germany
- Completed: 1899

Design and construction
- Architect: Friedrich Kullrich

Altes Stadthaus in Dortmund, North Rhine-Westphalia, Germany, is an office block which was built in 1899, and was designed by "master builder" Friedrich Kullrich (a German architect, urban planner and construction officer from Berlin). It was built in the Renaissance Revival architecture (Neo-Renaissance) style. After the office block was severely damaged in World War II, it was rebuilt in a simplified form.

At the top of the gable is an eagle emblem, representing the city of Dortmund. The façades are made of Old or New Red Sandstone and the lateral parts have plastered surfaces. Kullrich said that the Stadthaus was in the shape of Altes Rathaus. The Stadthaus is a short distance from Alter Markt, which houses the Rathaus on the south. The Rathaus was restored shortly after the Stadthaus was built, under the direction of the Commissioner of City Planning, for the City of Imperial visit to Dortmund in 1899. A new hall was built in 2002 (the Berswordt Hall), at Peace Square in Dortmund. Directly opposite of Peace Square is the Rathaus (town hall). The Berswordt Hall includes citizen services, a café and a shop, and was named after the Berswordt, one of the oldest families in Dortmund, who were first mentioned in 1249. The Stadthaus is mainly used by the Dortmund city administration, and has been since it was built. The office block is listed on the Denkmalliste der Stadt Dortmund (Monument list of Dortmund), which contains 1,015 monuments, many of them being listed buildings.
