= Florianturm =

Telecommunications tower and landmark of Dortmund, Germany

Coordinates: 51°29′47″N 7°28′35″E

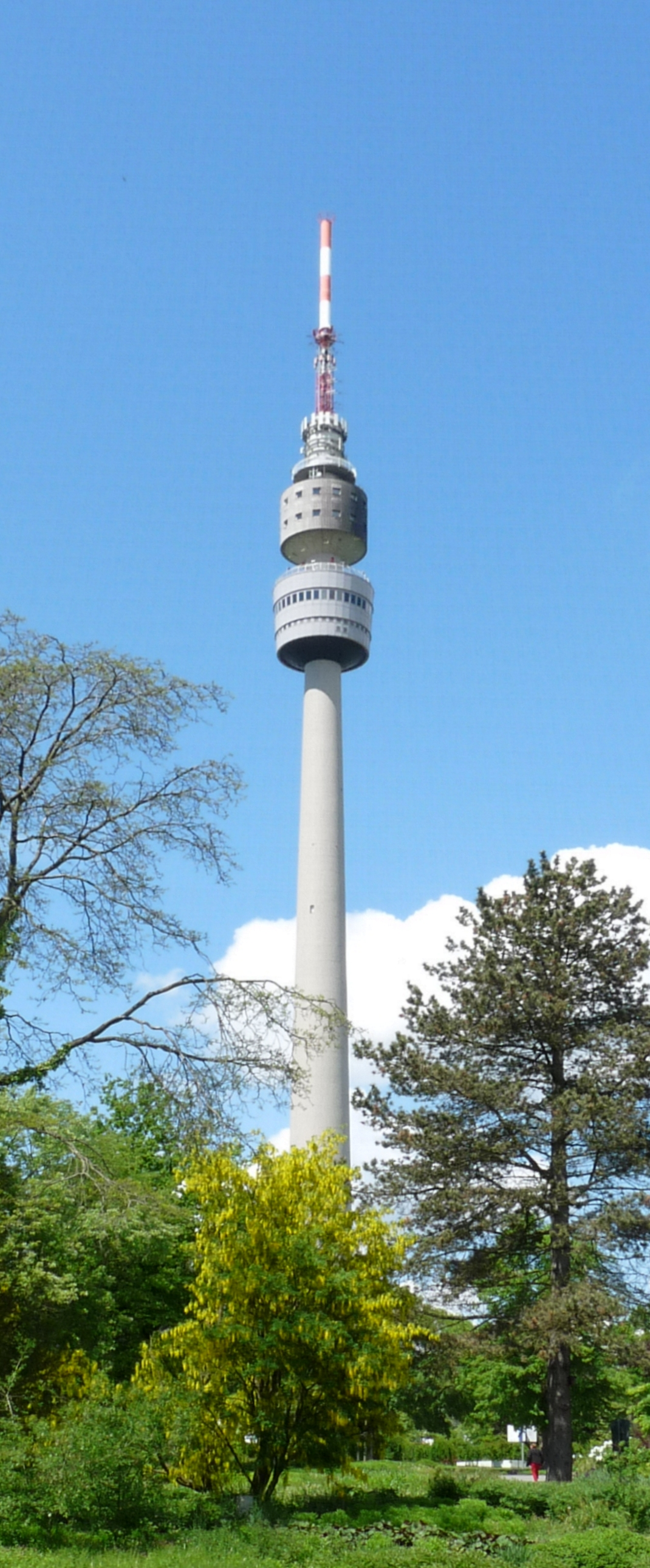
Florianturm Dortmund

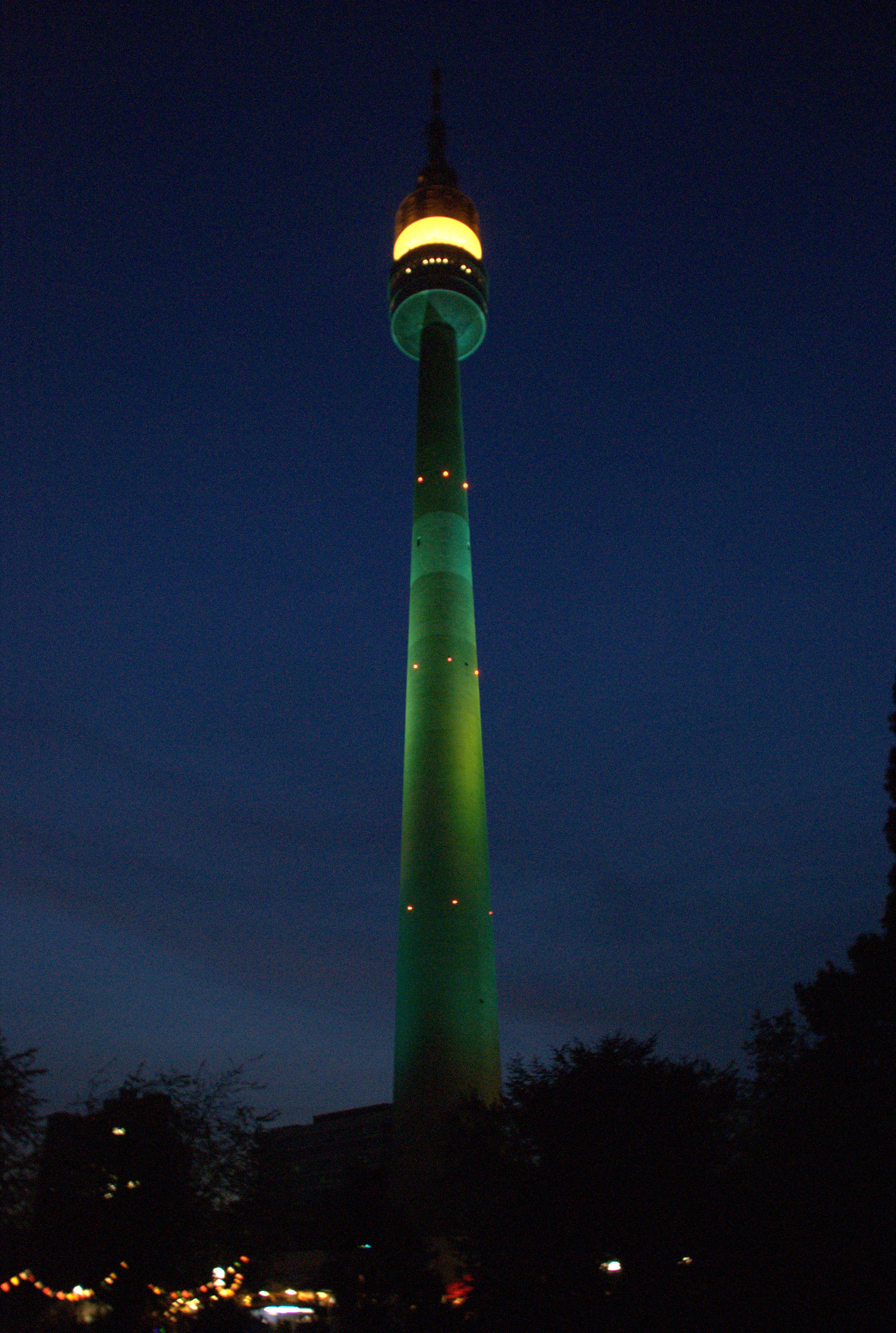
Florianturm Dortmund at night, with green showing up.

The Florianturm (Florian Tower, Florian for short) is a telecommunications tower and landmark of Dortmund (Germany). It is named after St. Florian, the patron saint of gardeners.

The Florianturm is the TV tower of Dortmund and was built in 1959 as an attraction for a federal horticultural show with a height of 219.6 metres (720 ft). At the time it was briefly the highest freestanding structure in Germany. It is the first TV tower in the world with a revolving restaurant.

The tower was constructed similarly to a high concrete chimney. It consists of a reinforced concrete tube, which tapers off as it rises, reaching a height of 129.75 metres (425.7 ft). At 130.6 metres (428 ft) there is a building part with two floors. On the lower floor there are operation rooms and on the upper floor at 137.54 metres (451.2 ft) there is a revolving restaurant. At 141.88 metres (465.5 ft) and 144.7 metres (475 ft) there are two observation decks.

On the upper observation deck there are installations and aerials of Deutsche Telekom. Since 1959 it has been used for transmitting television signals.

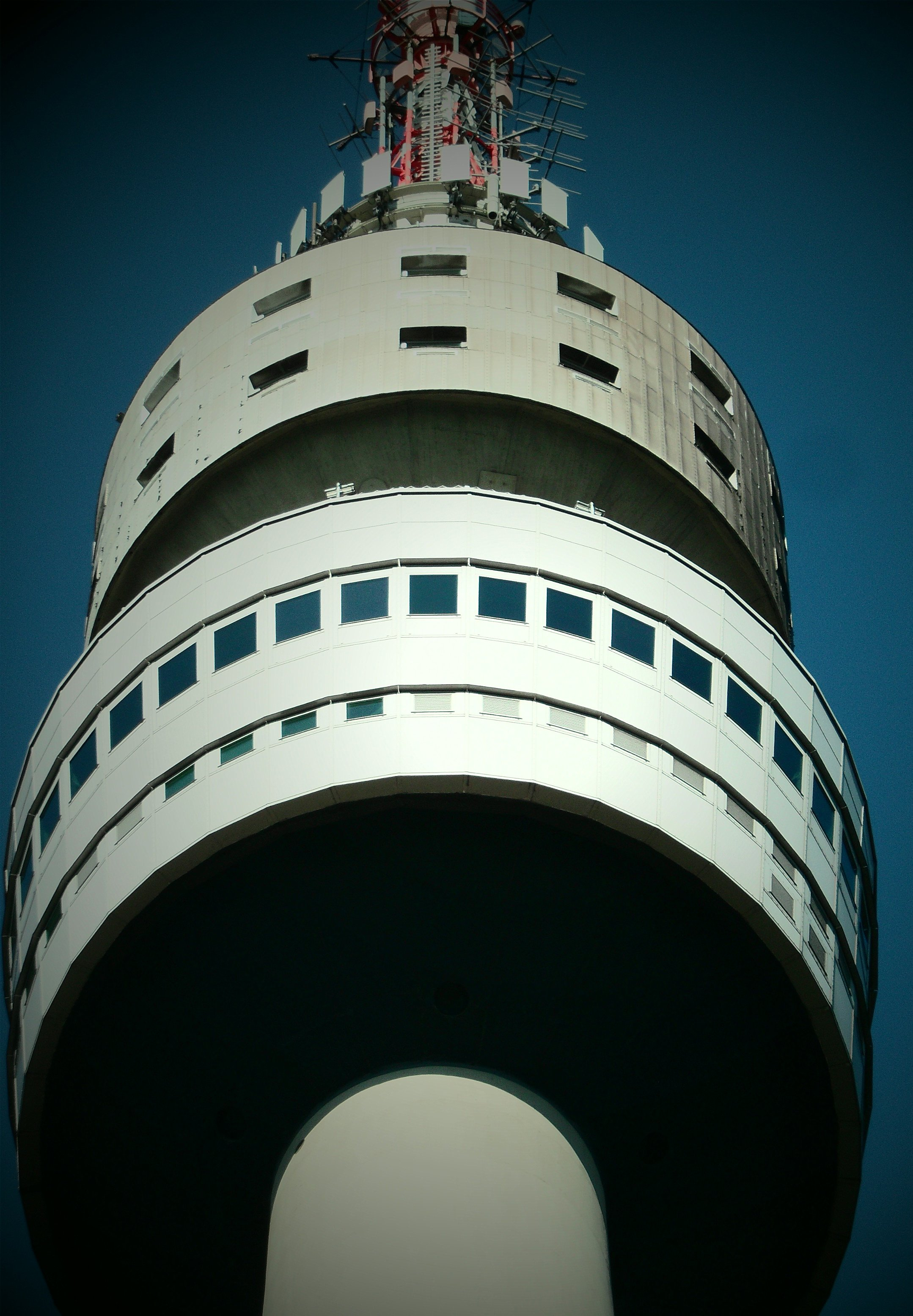
Top of the tower with antenna, and central observation platform, October 2015

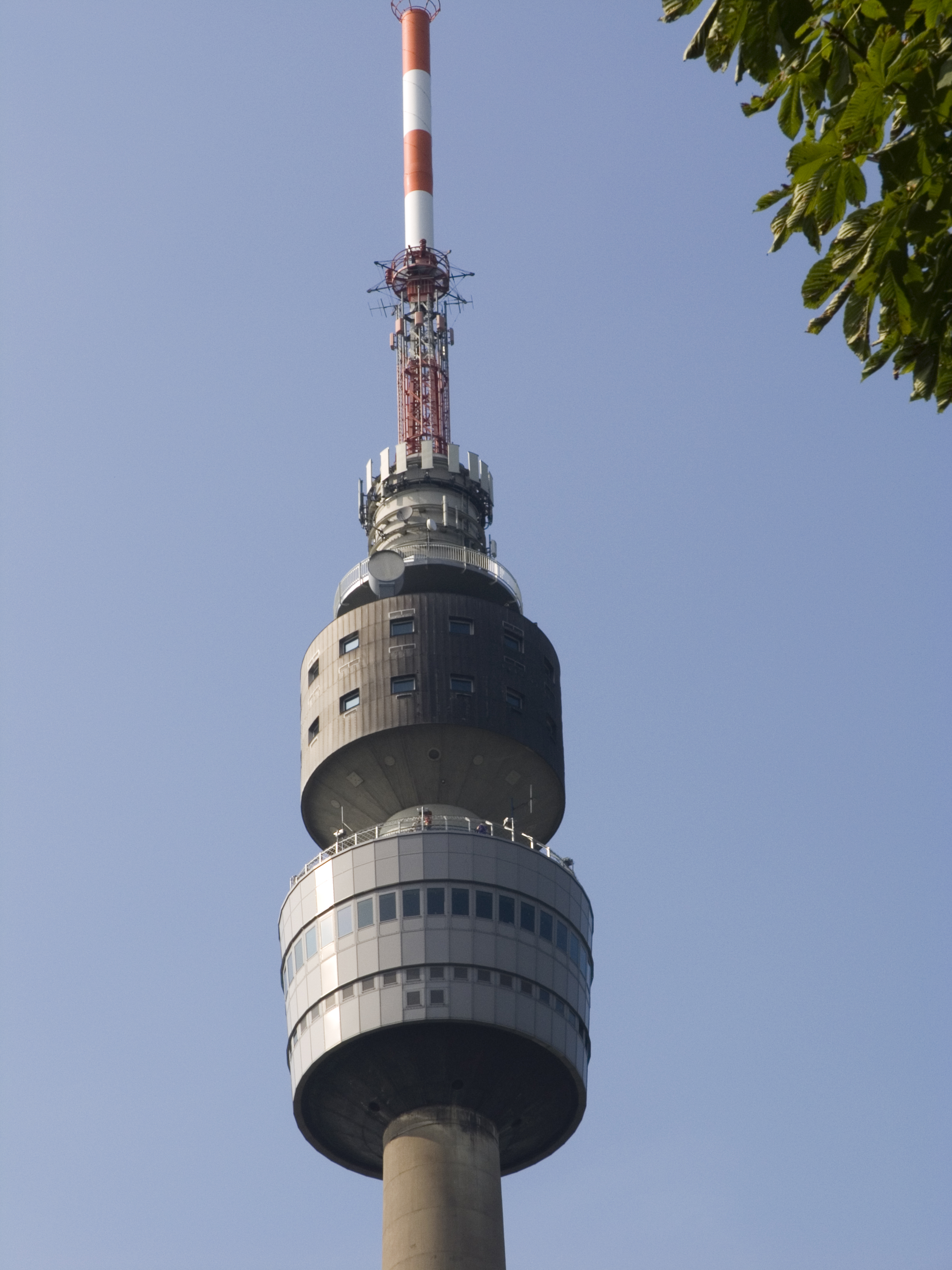
Tower Basket with antenna platforms

On 7 September 2004, a Kamow Ka-32 transport helicopter was used to replace the aerial. Since then, a 50-kilowatt transmitter has transmitted digital terrestrial television programmes for the Dortmund area.

Since 7 September 2004, the Florianturm has a height of 208.56 metres (684.3 ft), making it the fourteenth highest structure in Germany.

From 1996 to 1998, the tower was renovated and safety standards were brought up to date.

In 2000, a catwalk for bungee jumping was opened on the upper platform. It was closed in 2003 after a fatal accident and was removed in July 2008.

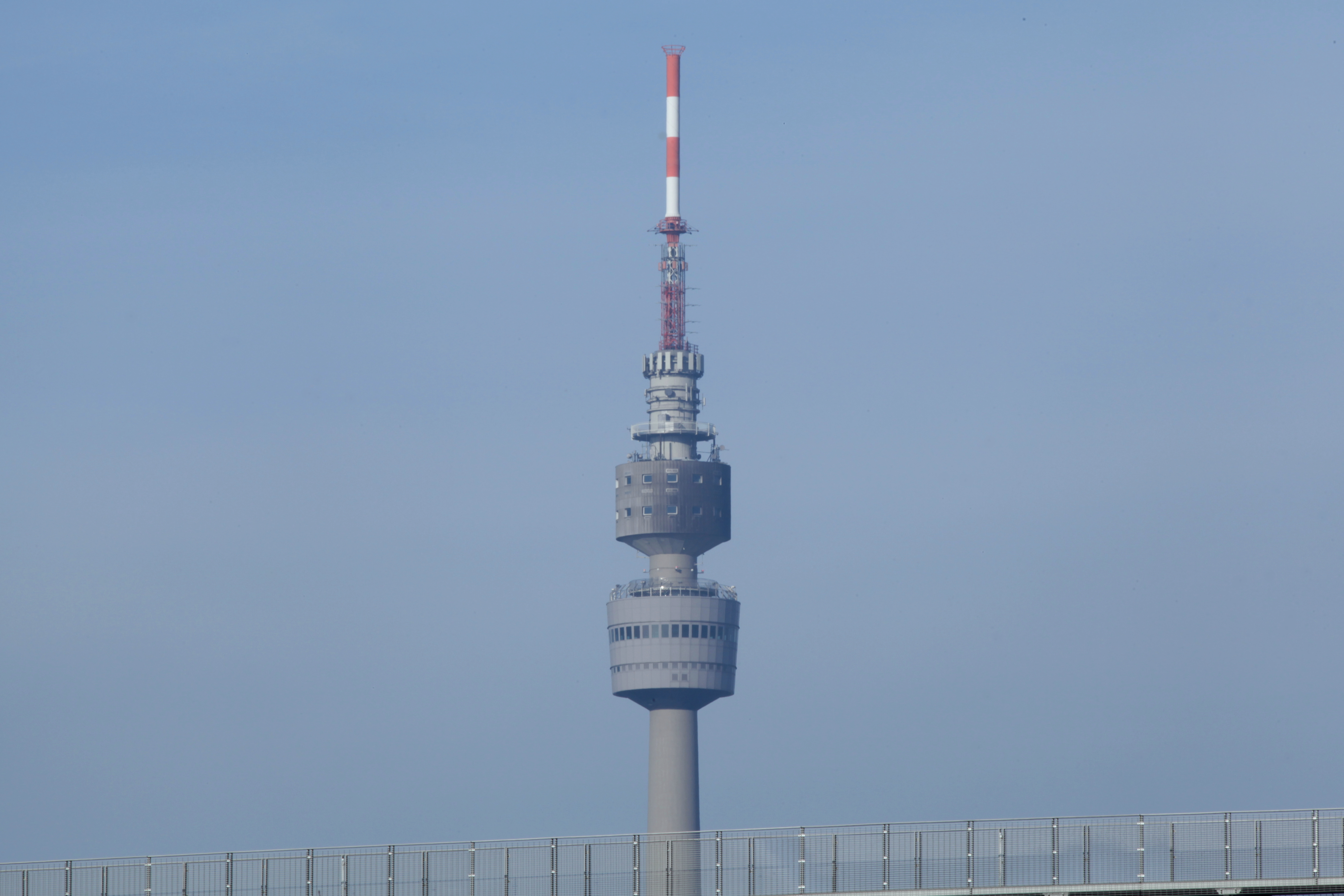
A view of the Florianturm in 2012

== Data ==
- Architect: Will Schwarz, Dortmund
- Construction time: May 1958 – April 1959
- Depth of basement: 8.10 m, the lowest part of the substructure is 110.3 m above sea level
- Diameter of basement: 25 m
- Thickness of basement plate: 2.5 m
- Total weight: approx. 7,700 t
- Volume of cement: approx. 1,385 t
- Total weight of concrete: approx. 3,400 m³
- Total weight of steel: approx. 660 t
- Stability ratio: 3.5x

== See also ==
- List of towers
