= The Temple of Juno in Agrigento =

Painting by Caspar David Friedrich

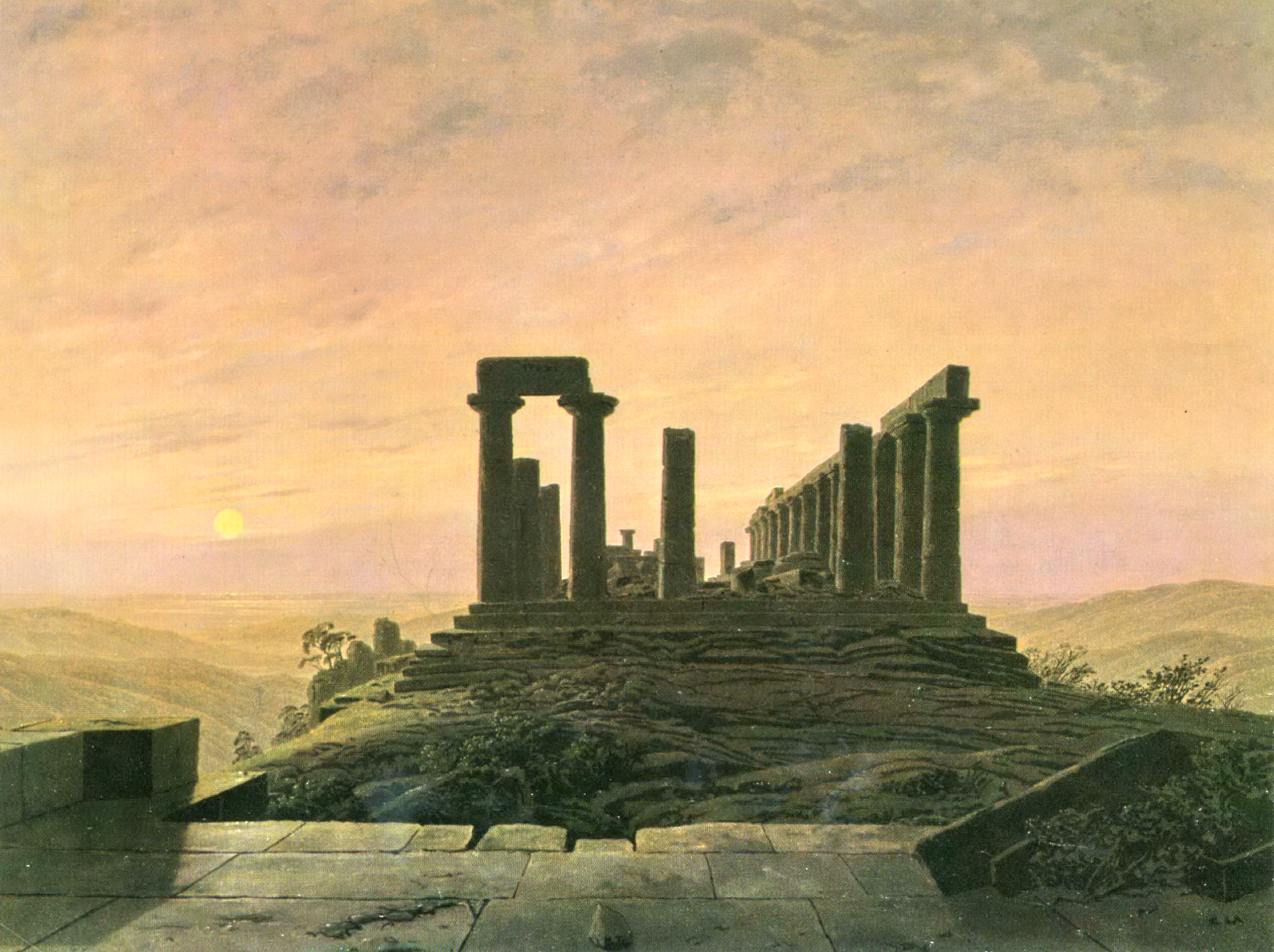
- Artist: Caspar David Friedrich
- Year: 1828–1830
- Medium: oil on canvas
- Dimensions: 54 cm × 72 cm (21 in × 28 in)
- Location: Museum für Kunst und Kulturgeschichte, Dortmund

The Temple of Juno in Agrigento (German - Junotempel in Agrigent) is an 1828–1830 oil on canvas painting of by Caspar David Friedrich. It is now in the Museum für Kunst und Kulturgeschichte, in Dortmund, which bought it from a Cologne art dealer in 1951. It is said to have been previously owned by the F. A. Brockhaus publishers in Leipzig.

The work shows the 460–450 BC Temple of Hera Lacinia in the Valle dei Templi in Agrigento, Sicily, sacked by the Carthaginians around 406 BC, rebuilt by the Romans and the subject of renewed interest for classicists and antiquarians from the mid 18th-century onwards. It was visited by both Jacob Philipp Hackert and Johann Wolfgang von Goethe, with the latter writing in his letters "The current view of the Temple of Juno is as gritty as one could wish for". However, Friedrich never visited Italy and produced the work from a print by another artist.

In 1943 Hermann Beenken published the painting with an attribution to Friedrich, later reattributing it to Carl Gustav Carus. Helmut Börsch-Supan argues it cannot be a late work by Carus, but is instead a Friedrich.

== Context ==
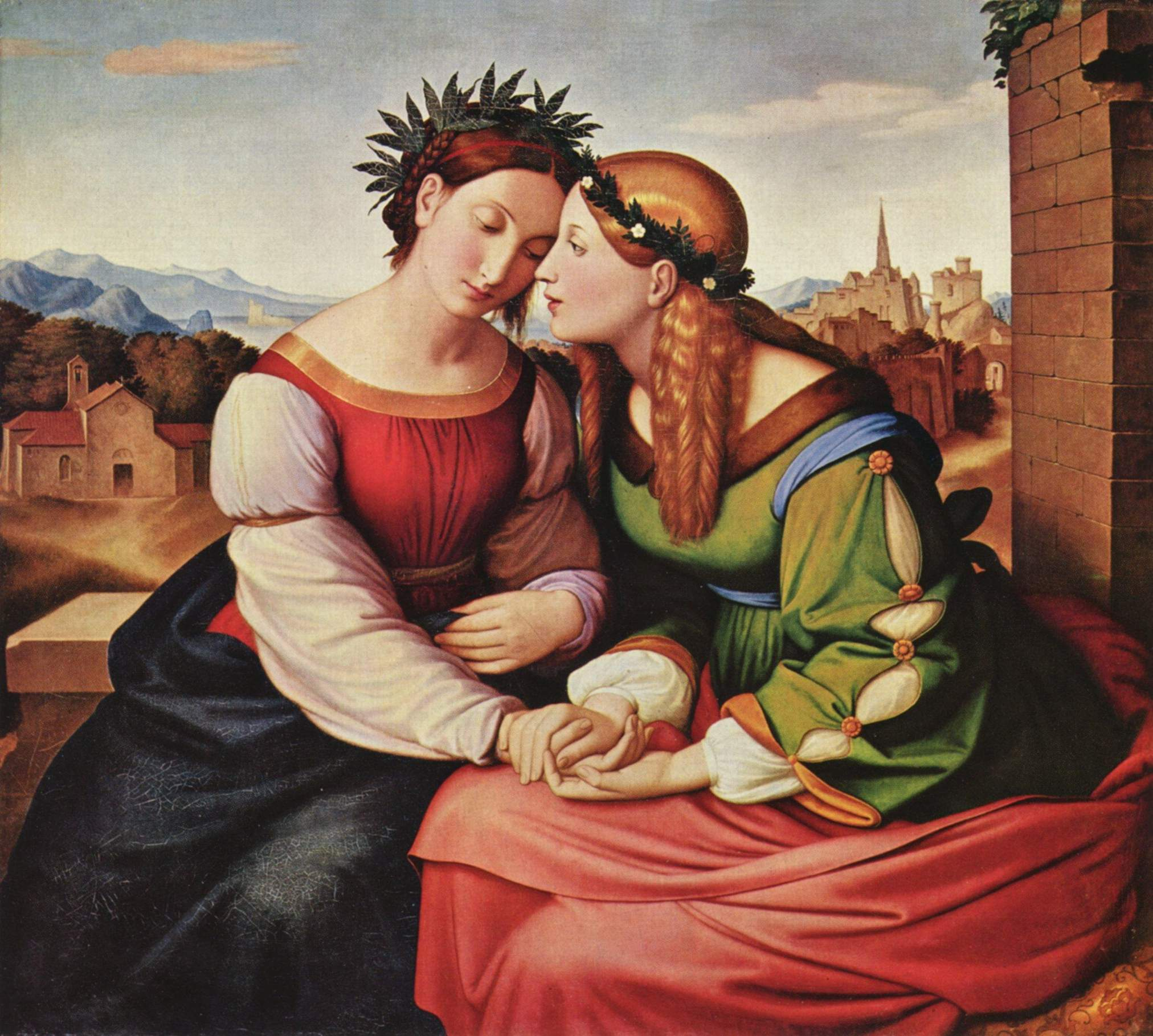
Friedrich Overbeck: Italia und Germania, 1828

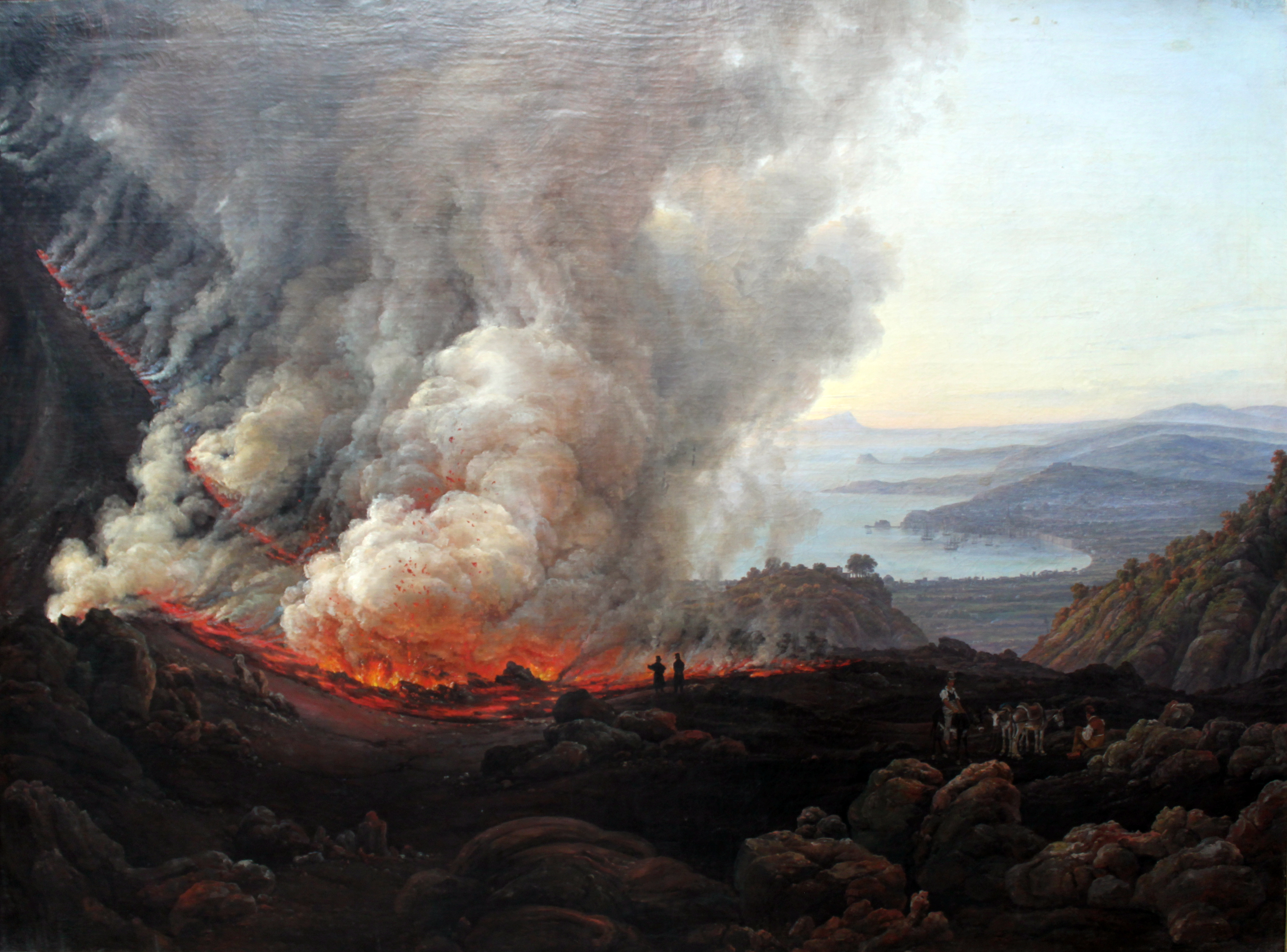
Johan Christian Clausen Dahl: Eruption of Vesuvius in December, 1824

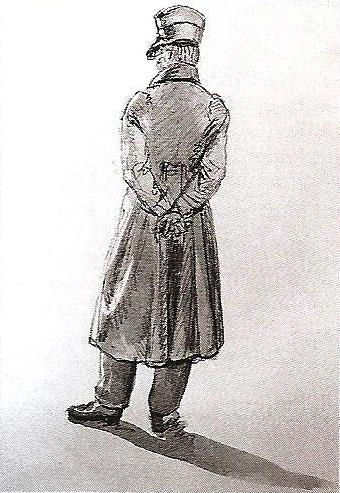
Johan Christian Clausen Dahl: Figure of Prof. Friedrich, drawing (detail), 1824

German enthusiasm for Italian art had peaked at the time the work was produced. In honour of Crown Prince Friedrich Wilhelm's visit to Italy in autumn 1828 an exhibition of Nazarene art was held at the Palazzo Caffarelli in Rome, including the first showing of Friedrich Overbeck's allegorical work Italia und Germania. The Crown Prince favoured these artists, but Friedrich rejected them, writing of one that he must have painted a number of works "through coloured glass ... Perhaps he should try the dangerous idea of painting of painting without glasses, by which objects would appear to him as they do to other honest folk who haven't been in Rome and have healthy eyes". he wrote of Ernst Ferdinand Oehme that he might have got further in art had he "not travelled to Rome" and that he had "greatly improved" since returning from thence, getting clear of the fashionable influence of Joseph Anton Koch who was "no longer a student of nature". He also wrote of a number of similar artists as being "no longer satisfied with our German sun, moon and stars, our rocks, trees and herbs, seas and rivers"

His reason for rejecting a trip to Italy is unknown, possibly for fear of betraying German brotherhood, though it was not from lack of funds, since he turned down invitations from his painter friend Frederik Christian Lund in 1816:

Thank you for your friendly invitation to Rome, but I must admit my mind never went there. But now that I am leafing through some of H[err] Farber's sketchbooks I have become almost completely different. I can now imagine travelling to Rome and living there. But I couldn't think of returning north without shuddering; in my opinion, that would mean so much: like burying oneself alive. I put up with staying put, without grumbling, if fate wills it that way; but going backwards is contrary to my nature. My whole being is outraged

Jens Christian Jensen argues that Friedrich deliberately and rigorously kept both his radius of travel and his choice of subjects for his pictures narrow. Ironically, Friedrich's friend Johan Christian Clausen Dahl took him to Naples virtually by including a figure of him in his Eruption of Vesuvius, identifiable from a labelled preparatory drawing.

Friedrich was not alone in criticising the Nazarenes, though the Nazarenes themselves maintained that only artists could judge art Johann Christian Reinhart, Bertel Thorvaldsen, Philipp Veit and Joseph Anton Koch wrote counterblasts to the German art critics in the polemic Drei Schreiben aus Rom gegen Kunstschreiberei in Deutschland. However, many artists such as Ludwig Richter did diminish in quality after time in Italy, producing emptier and emptier work the more time they spent there.

== Analysis ==
Most of the rest of Friedrich's oeuvre rejects neoclassicism and its idealised versions of Roman and Greek architecture in favour of the Gothic. Helmut Börsch-Supan interprets the temple's depiction in the work, surrounded by a barren landscape, symbolises the death of ancient pagan religion, as in the artist's treatment of pagan megalithic tombs, whilst Jens Christian Jensen argued that the work was painted to prove an artist could produce profound Italian subjects without actually having to travel there. Detlef Stapf sees it as a melancholic architectural work drawing on an idea in Christian Cay Lorenz Hirschfeld's Theorie der Gartenkunst (Theory of Garden Art) and that it was produced in hope of its being easier to sell than Friedrich's Gothic works.

=== Sources ===
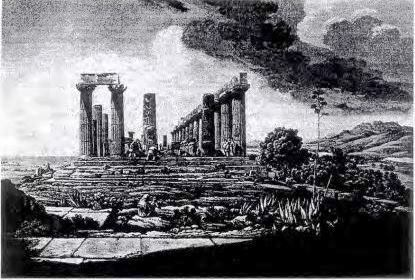
Carl Ludwig Frommel: Temple of Agrigento, before 1780

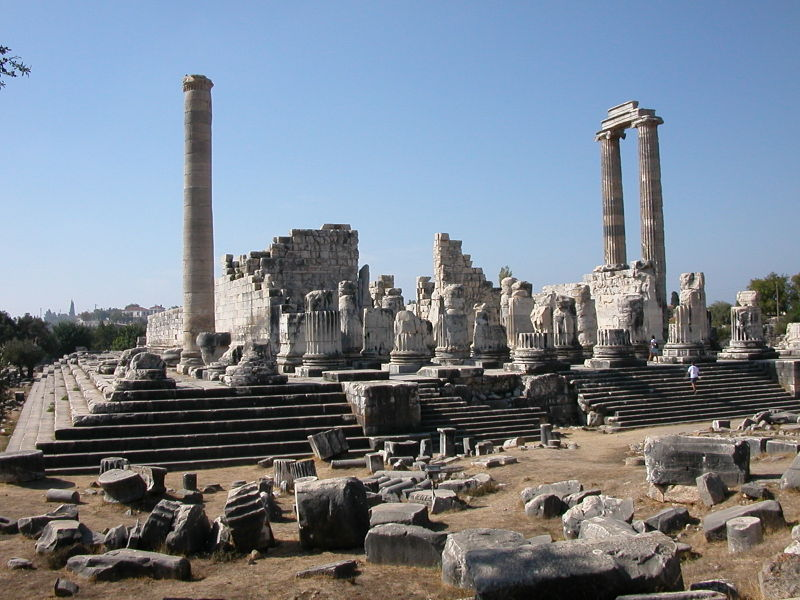
Temple of Apollo in Didyma

According to Paul Ortwin Rave the work was based on an aquatint by Franz Hegi, itself based on a watercolour by Carl Ludwig Frommel. Hegi produced the aquatints for Voyage pittoresque en Sicile for the Paris book-dealer Jean Frédérik Ostervald between 1822 and 1826., though the watercolours on which they were based dated back to 1780.

Friedrich made several modifications to the source print, omitting the staffage and aloe trees in the foreground and the olive trees in the right middle ground and turning the lighting from frontal daylight to a background sunset. The rubble to the left was reworked as Elbe sandstone and the trees and shrubs turned into central European examples from Friedrich's homeland, the background mountains were altered, both showing the painter's lack of interest in the ruins' original Mediterranean setting. Altogether his alterations also demonstrate his obedience to Christian Cay Lorenz Hirschfeld's 'Wirkungsästhetik', particularly as stated in the chapter 'Of Temples, Grottoes, Hermitages, Chapels and Ruins' in Theorie der Gartenkunst:

What sensations of melancholy and sadness did not sometimes seize the traveling admirers of antiquity when, in the formerly beautifully built lands of Greece, they found sleeping places for shepherds and wild animals' caves amidst the remains of temples! [Richard] Chandler describes such a fierce appearance when he saw the ruins of the [Hellenistic] Temple of Apollo at Ura, not far from Miletus. The columns were so extraordinarily beautiful, the marble mass so large and noble that it is perhaps impossible to imagine more beautiful or majestic ruins [...] The whole mass was illuminated by the setting sun with a variety of rich inks, and cast a very strong shadow. The distant sea was flat and shiny, and bordered by a mountainous coast with rocky islands.

Friedrich's adaptations of the source watercolour and print also show the contrast between neo-classicism and romanticism and between classicising tendencies in art and Friedrich's Christian-Romanticism. The watercolour was intended not only as a tool and record of archaeology (then rapidly developing as a subject), but also as a way of transmitting to German readers as much information as possible about the ancient ruins and contemporary Sicilian vegetation, animal husbandry, local people and landscapes and a way of demonstrating to Christian readers the downfall of ancient pagan religion. In contrast, Romanticism is less interested in accurate topographical and historical information than in how the temple and landscape would act on the beholder's souls, with the temple's shadow at sunset more important than the temple itself. This especially manifests itself in the work's close-up detail, initially drawn in pencil on a light primer layer, before being reinforced with a reed pen and then glazed in several thin layers to give shades of tone and a different viewing experience at different distances.

== Place in Friedrich's oeuvre ==
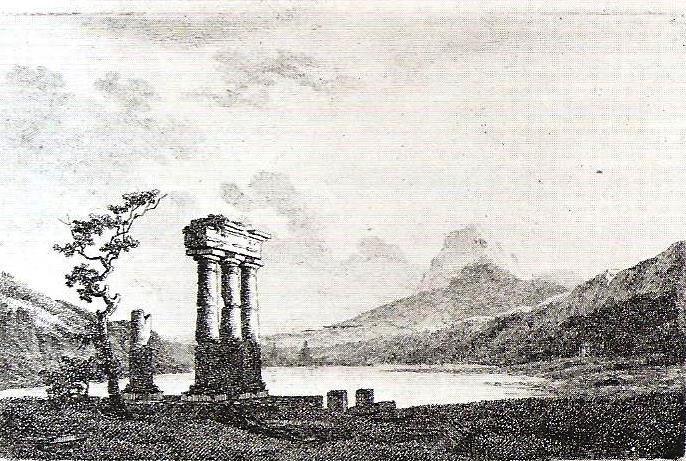
Caspar David Friedrich: Landscape with Temple Ruins, c. 1803

An ancient temple is a rare but not unique motif in the artist's work. Around 1803 he produced the etching Landscape with Temple Ruins., possibly created according to Hirschfeld's Theorie der Gartenkunst (Theory of Garden Art).

== See also ==
- List of works by Caspar David Friedrich

== Bibliography (in German) ==
- Hermann Beenken: Eine romantische Landschaft mit dem Junotempel von Agrigent. In: Die Kunst 59, S. 1, 2
- Helmut Börsch-Supan, Karl Wilhelm Jähnig: Caspar David Friedrich. Gemälde, Druckgraphik und bildmäßige Zeichnungen, Prestel Verlag, München 1973, ISBN 3-7913-0053-9 (Werkverzeichnis)
- Sigrid Hinz (Hrsg.): Caspar David Friedrich in Briefen und Bekenntnissen. Henschelverlag Kunst und Gesellschaft, Berlin 1974
- Jens Christian Jensen: Caspar David Friedrich. Leben und Werk. DuMont Verlag, Köln 1999
- Detlef Stapf: Caspar David Friedrichs verborgene Landschaften. Die Neubrandenburger Kontexte. Greifswald 2014, netzbasiert P-Book
- Herrmann Zschoche: Caspar David Friedrich. Die Briefe. ConferencePoint Verlag, Hamburg 2005, ISBN 3-936406-12-X
