= Hans Wildermann =

German stage designer, painter and sculptor

Hans Wilhelm Wildermann (21 February 1884 – 1 November 1954) was a German stage designer, painter and sculptor.

== Life ==
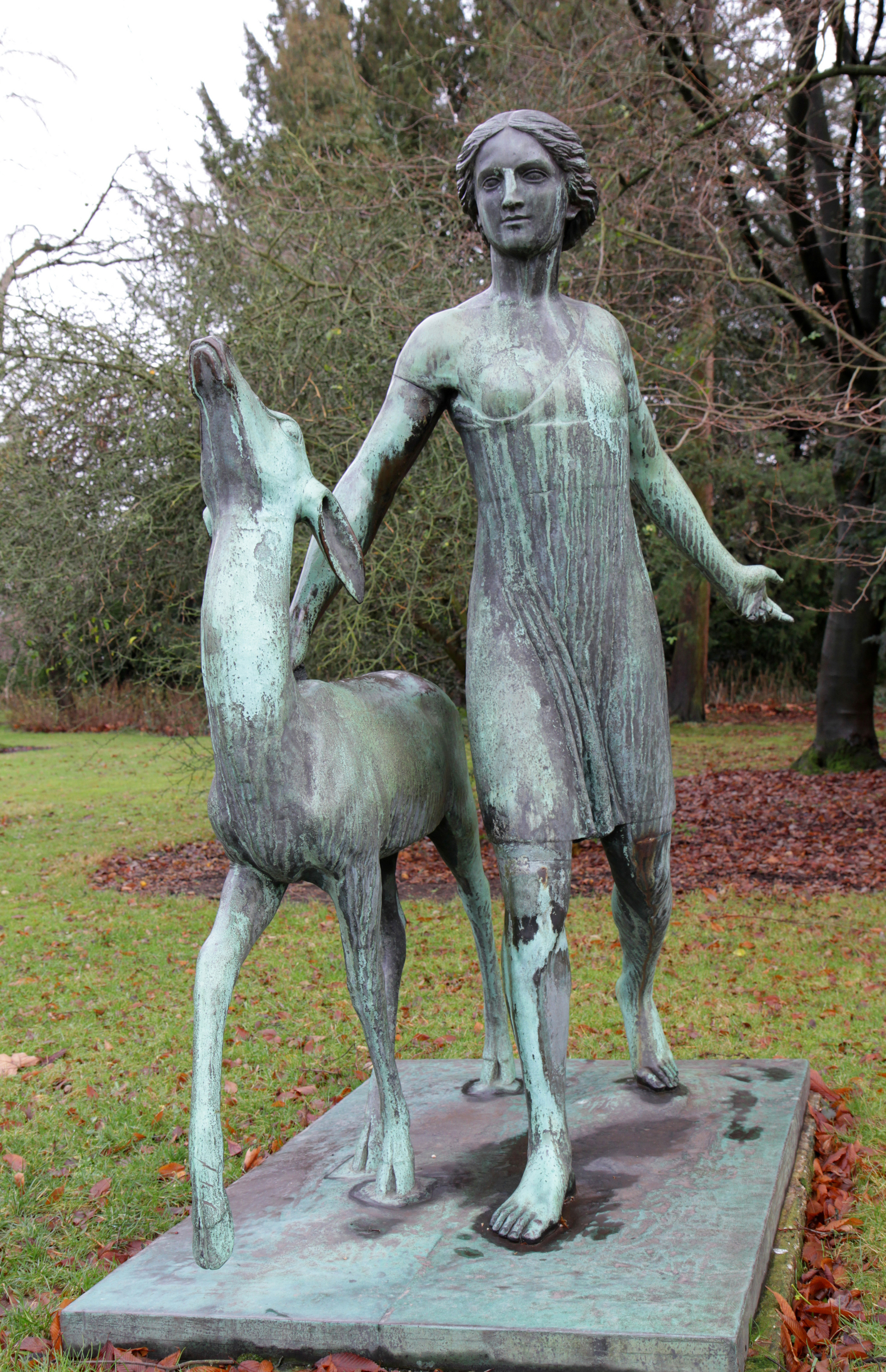
Girl with a deer, 1911

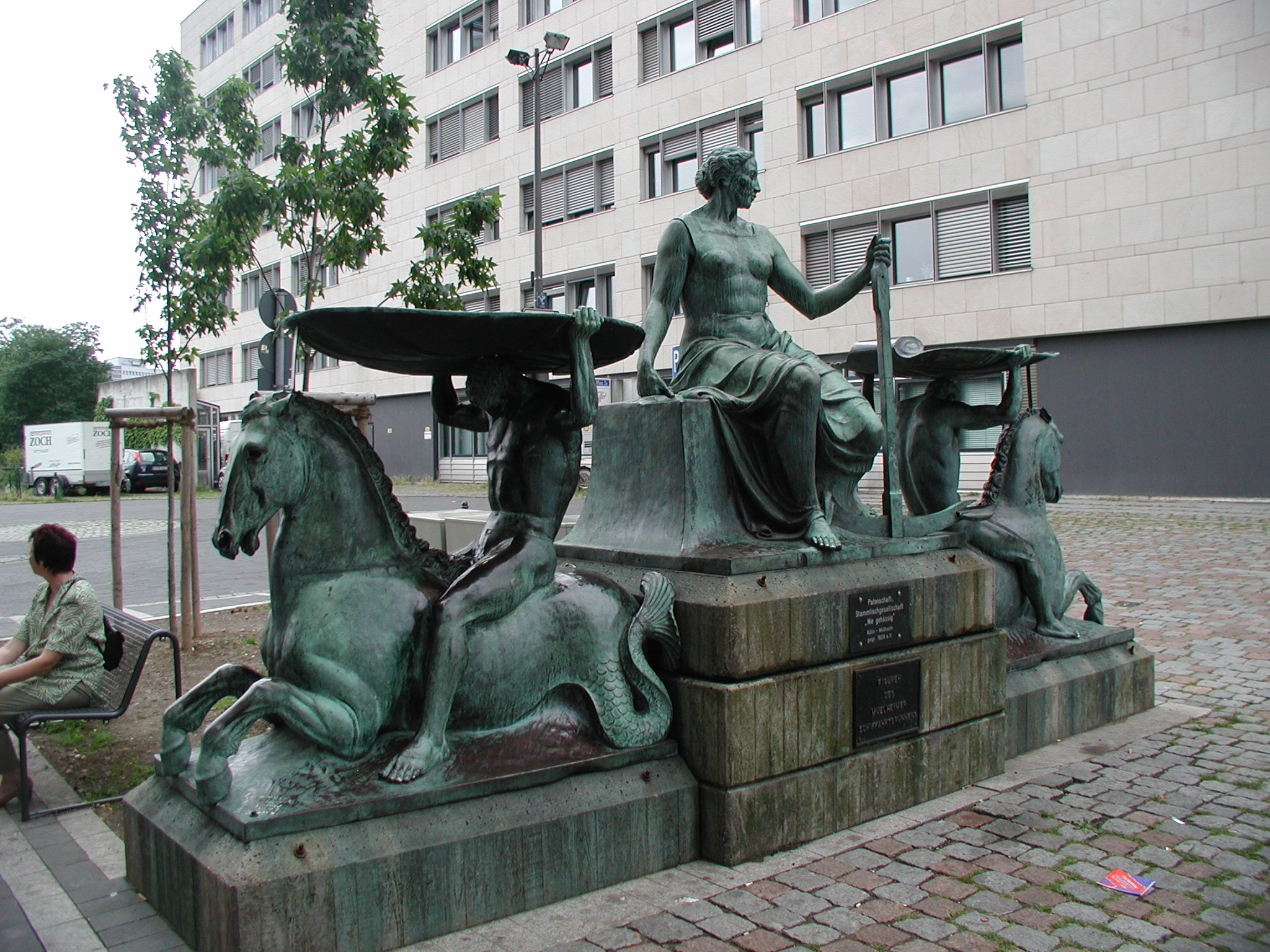
Shipping fountain in Köln-Mülheim, 1913

Wildermann was born in Cologne the son of the authorised agent Heinrich W. Wildermann and his wife Maria Wildermann, née Röhr. He first attended schools in Recklinghausen and Cologne and then studied at the Kunstakademie Düsseldorf, the Universität der Künste Berlin and the Akademie der Bildenden Künste München. In Düsseldorf, where he studied from 1900 to 1903, Peter Janssen and Willy Spatz were his teachers.

From 1907, Wildermann lived again in his home town, where he worked under Max Martersteig and his conductor Otto Lohse on the decoration of the Bühnen der Stadt Köln and as a sculptor. Martersteig had seen Wildermann's etching Tor der Phantasie. Contact then arose through Lohse's wife, in whose salon the theatre world from Germany and other countries met. Wildermann then participated in the 1911 Opera Festival and the following year took part in the Cologne Sonderbund exhibition, where he created the group of figures "Young Man with Pony" and "Girl with Deer" for the forecourt of the exhibition hall at the Aachener Tor which later stood in the green spaces of Ebertplatz until World War II. In 1912 the Kölner Brunnen.

Until the end of the First World War, he worked mainly as a sculptor, painter and graphic artist. Somehow this doesn't really fit in anywhere, he seems to have been constantly on the move in all the arts during that time.

In 1912, Johannes Maurach brought him to the Stadttheater Essen as a guest stage designer. A year later, in 1913, he went to Munich, where he met Paul Klee. This was followed by collaborations with the Berlin Opera House, the Nationaltheater München and the Opernhaus Leipzig. In August 1919, Wildermann again followed Maurach, who was now artistic director at the Städtische Bühnen Dortmund. In 1920 he then married Erna Maria Concordia Hoheisel in Berlin. When Maurach went to Nuremberg in 1922/1923, Wildermann also followed him initially. However, the new Dortmund artistic director Karl Schäffer succeeded in bringing Wildermann back to Dortmund. In 1926, Hans Wildermann moved to Breslau, where he received a professorship for theatre painting at the Staatliche Akademie für Kunst und Kunstgewerbe Breslau. From 1936 he was head of the decoration department at the Wroclaw Opera House. In 1937, the National Socialists confiscated his triptych Transfiguration and declared it Degenerate Art.

After the Second World War, Wildermann returned to his home town of Cologne, where he last lived in Riehl, not far from the Cologne Zoological Garden. On 1 November 1954, he died in the Universitätsklinikum Köln in the district of Lindenthal at the age of 70. His marriage produced a daughter, Angelika.

== Wildermann and National Socialism ==
Already in the 1920s, Wildermann had a deep friendship with the nationalist and, since 1933, national-socialist Regensburg music book publisher Gustav Bosse. Bosse had him illustrate the Almanach der Deutschen Musikbücherei (1920-1927) extensively and dedicated a separate publishing line to him, Hans-Wildermann-Werke, in which almost the entire graphic work had already appeared in 1923. Wildermann cut the Anton Bruckner Medal of the International Bruckner Society in 1936 on the occasion of the unveiling of Anton Bruckner's bust in the Valhalla on 6 June 1937; a commission that once again emanated from Bosse. In 1942, he illustrated the book Italian Poetry from Dante to Mussolini - An Anthology (Gauverlag-NS-Silesia), and in the same year was honoured with Siegmund Skraup's book Die Oper als lebendiges Theater by illustrating 35 stage sets. His illustrations for Die Schildbürger appeared in the Feldbuchhandel for the 63,000th time in 1942. For his 60th birthday in 1944, the magazine published Musik im Kriege – Organ of the Office of Music at the Fuehrer's Commissioner for the Supervision of All Spiritual and Ideological Training and Education of the NSDAP the homage by Carl Niessen Hans Wildermann als Bühnenbildner (issue 1, pp. 7–9).

== Achievements ==
Wildermann began his career during the economically difficult period of the Weimar Republic. However, he used the financial bottlenecks as an opportunity and implemented new developments from painting in stage design. Instead of elaborate, decorative scenery, he used simple shapes and achieved desired effects with colours and lighting.

In addition to his work as a stage designer, Wildermann always worked as a sculptor, painter and graphic artist. The Museum für Kunst und Kulturgeschichte in Dortmund, dedicated a place to him in its permanent exhibition.

The "Werkfolge" of Hans Wildermann's works published in 1933 by Ernst Scheyer, curator and deputy director of the Silesian Museum of Applied Arts and Antiquities at Breslau, comprises 589 titles. Among them are 72 paintings and 60 sculptures.

== Work ==
Paintings

- Homer, 1911, Wandgemälde im Deutschen Theater., Cologne, Bismarckstr. 7 (war-destroyed)
- Faust am Meer, 1911, Wandgemälde im Deutschen Theater, Cologne, Bismarckstr. 7 (war-destroyed)
- Griechischer Frühling, 1913, Wandgemälde in der Villa Kruska, Köln-Lindenthal, Pfarriusstr. 4 (Architekt Joseph Maria Olbrich, 1907/08)
- Transfiguration, Elias, Johannes der Täufer, 1924, Triptychon, Öl auf Holz

Plastiken

- Dr. Max Martersteig, 1908, Bronze (1933: Besitzer Theatermuseum Köln).
- Mädchen mit Reh, 1911, Bronze-Skulptur., Köln-Riehl (Flora Botanical Garden)
- Jüngling mit Pony (also Jüngling mit Pferd) 1911, Bronze-Skulptur., Köln-Müngersdorf, Stadionschwimmbad
- Schifffahrtsbrunnen, 1912, Bronze., für die Düsseldorfer Städteausstellung erstellt, 1913 in Köln-Mülheim aufgestellt
- Industrie- und Handelsbrunnen, 1912, Bronze., für die Düsseldorfer Städteausstellung erstellt, 1913 in Köln-Mülheim aufgestellt
- Knabe mit Kaninchen, 1913, Bronze auf Steinsockel, Köln-Kalk (Stadtgarten).
- Christian Morgenstern, 1918, Bronzeplastik (1933 im Städtischen Museum, Darmstadt).
- Johannes der Täufer, 1924, wooden statue.
- Otto-Lohse-Urne (mit 3 Figuren), 1925, Bronzetempelchen zu Ehren von Otto Lohse.
- Liegende-Madonna, 1928, Holzplastik.

Cycles

- Faust-Wirklichkeiten, 1909 to 1919, collection with 49 prints., created on the occasion of Faust productions by Max Martersteig.

Single pages

- Vier Elemente, 1922, Grafik.
