= Rudolf Weber (musicologist) =

German musicologist

Rudolf Weber (born 1937) is a German musicologist and was Rector of the University of Hildesheim from 1990 to 1995. He is professor emeritus at the University of Hildesheim.

== Life and career ==
Weber began studying to be an elementary school teacher in Osnabrück in 1959 with the elective subject "music" and taught as an elementary school teacher in Heiligenrode from 1962. In 1965, he began studying musicology, pedagogy and psychology at the University of Münster, in addition to assisting at the Osnabrück College of Education. In 1972, he completed his doctorate there with the dissertation: Die Sinfonien Franz Schubert im Versuch einer strukturwissenschaftlichen Darstellung und Untersuchung. In 1973, he became an academic councillor, senior councillor and then professor of music didactics at the University of Osnabrück. In 1983, he became a professor at the University of Hildesheim.

== Work ==
- Die Sinfonien Franz Schuberts im Versuch einer strukturwissenschaftlichen Darstellung und Untersuchung, Münster, 1971
- Musikalische Autonomie und Textbezug in Vokalwerken von strenger Satztechnik, 1997
- with Siegmund Helms, Reinhard Schneider: Neues Lexikon der Musikpädagogik, Kassel 1994
- with Siegmund Helms, Reinhard Schneider: Kompendium der Musikpädagogik, Kassel 1995
- with Siegmund Helms, Reinhard Schneider: Handbuch des Musikunterrichts, Kassel 1997
