= Joachim Friedmann =

German screenwriter and comic author

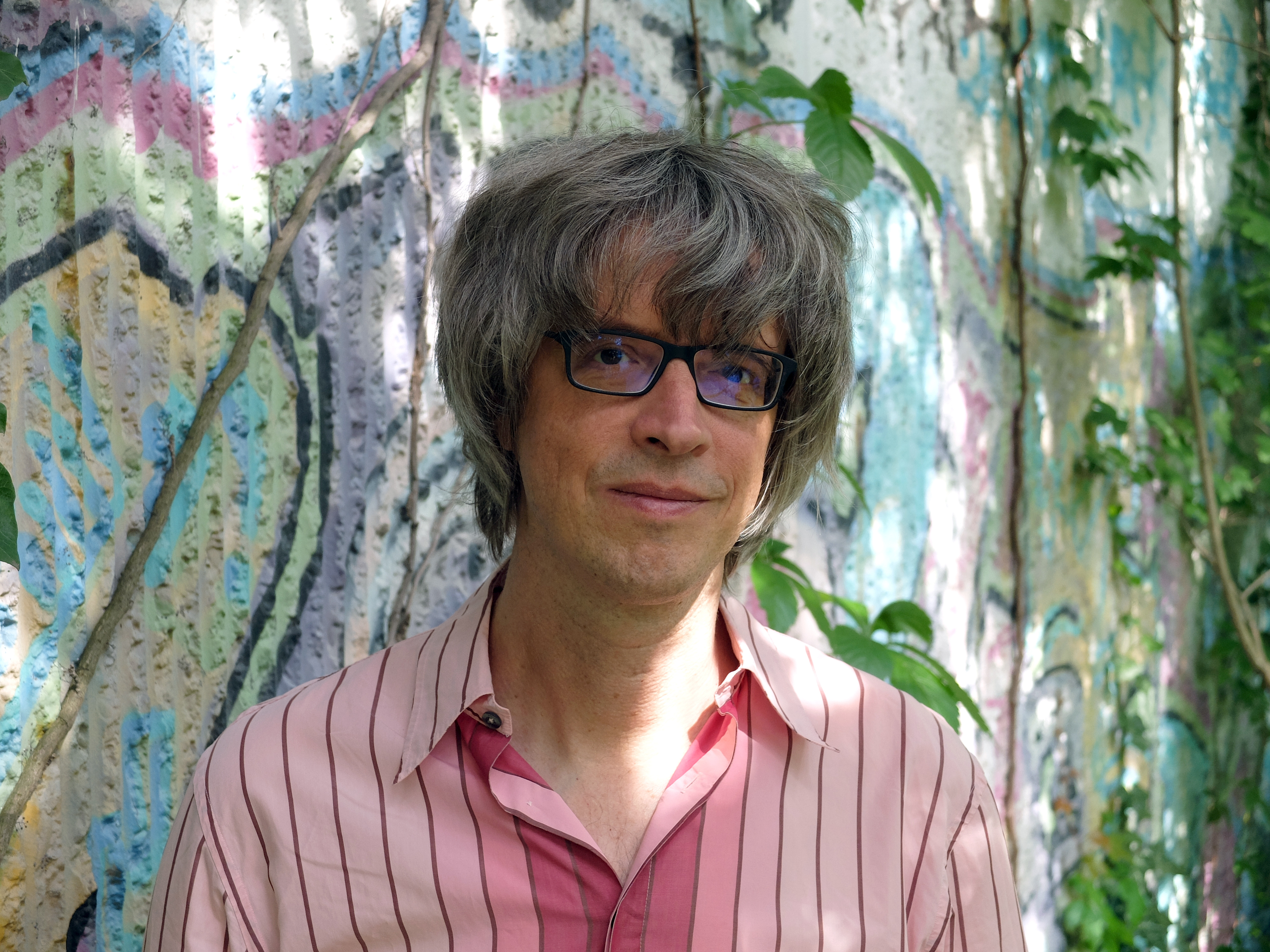
Prof. Dr. Joachim Friedmann (2017)

Joachim Friedmann (born 8 October 1966) is a German screenwriter, comic author, and video game writer.

== Early life ==
The son of a German lecturer at Sapporo University, Joachim Friedmann grew up in Hokkaidō before moving to Marburg, Germany in 1971.

== Career ==
He initially studied Art History, English and Japanese Studies between 1989 and 1995 where he completed a course in Cultural Studies in Hildesheim. In 2016, he was awarded a doctorate with a thesis on transmedial narrative from the European University Viadrina in Frankfurt (Oder).

As a comic author, Friedmann published the story Seite 756 with cartoonist Henk Wyniger, winning a prize at the Comic Salon in Erlangen, Germany. This was followed by a contract for Friedmann and Wyniger at the Carlsen publishing house with their own comic series based on the heroes Lais and Ben. The author and illustrator used themselves as models for the characters. A two-volume adventure followed - in collaboration with Oliver Hirschbiegel - with the comic adaptation of the two-channel thriller Murderous Decisions. Additionally, Friedmann was the sole German author to write five Donald Duck comics between 1997 and 2003. Also during this time, he produced numerous German translations of Donald Duck comics for Disney.

In the following years, Friedmann wrote a two-volume comic for the series Lindenstraße for Carlsen, working as a comic writer for the series' internet presence. In 1997 he joined their writers team for the television series. Four years later, the series would win a gold Adolf Grimme Award. Up to 2002, Friedmann wrote 52 episodes for the cult series.

Since writing for Lindenstraße, Friedmann has worked as a screenwriter for the series Für alle Fälle Stefanie, Die Camper, Nicht von dieser Welt, Klinik am Alex and Hinter Gittern.

In 2010/2011 he has written scripts for the series In aller Freundschaft, Der letzte Bulle and Gute Zeiten, schlechte Zeiten. Between 2015 and 2019, he worked as a story editor for the ARD series In aller Freundschaft - Die jungen Ärzte. In 2018, he wrote the screenplay for the TV movie Die jungen Ärzte - Ganz in Weiss.

Friedmann also wrote the dubbing scripts for the Japanese anime series Lupin III and received the "Sat.1 Talent Award" for the best sitcom concept in 2004. Joachim Friedmann continues to work for various broadcasters as a series developer and consultant.

Since 2011, Friedmann has also been the author of computer and online games. He developed the educational game "Die Schlaumäuse" for Microsoft Germany. In 2013 the game was awarded the "Digita", the German educational media prize. He's also worked as the conceptual designer for the DFB helping to develop the DFB's mascot "PAULE" in 2014.

In addition to his work as an author, Friedmann works as a lecturer and coach. He is considered a pioneer in the training of series writers. He teaches dramaturgy and creative writing, among other topics at the University of Hildesheim, the Babelsberg Film Academy in Potsdam, the Hamburg Media School and the Institute for Acting, Film and Television in Berlin. In 2017 he was appointed Professor of Serial Storytelling at the International Film School Cologne. Since then he has also taught in an international context, including work in Morocco and at the University of Nigeria.

Friedmann also works as a coach and consultant for businesses. Since 2012, he has been active leading seminars and workshops on the topics of creativity training, communication skills and strategic business communication through storytelling. Friedmann has also written textbooks in German and English on the topic of storytelling and narrative design.

== Personal life ==
Friedmann married Sybille Waury, one of the leading actresses of the series Lindenstraße.
