= Siegmund Helms =

German musicologist and music educator

Siegmund Helms (14 December 1938 – 30 June 2025) was a German musicologist and music educator.

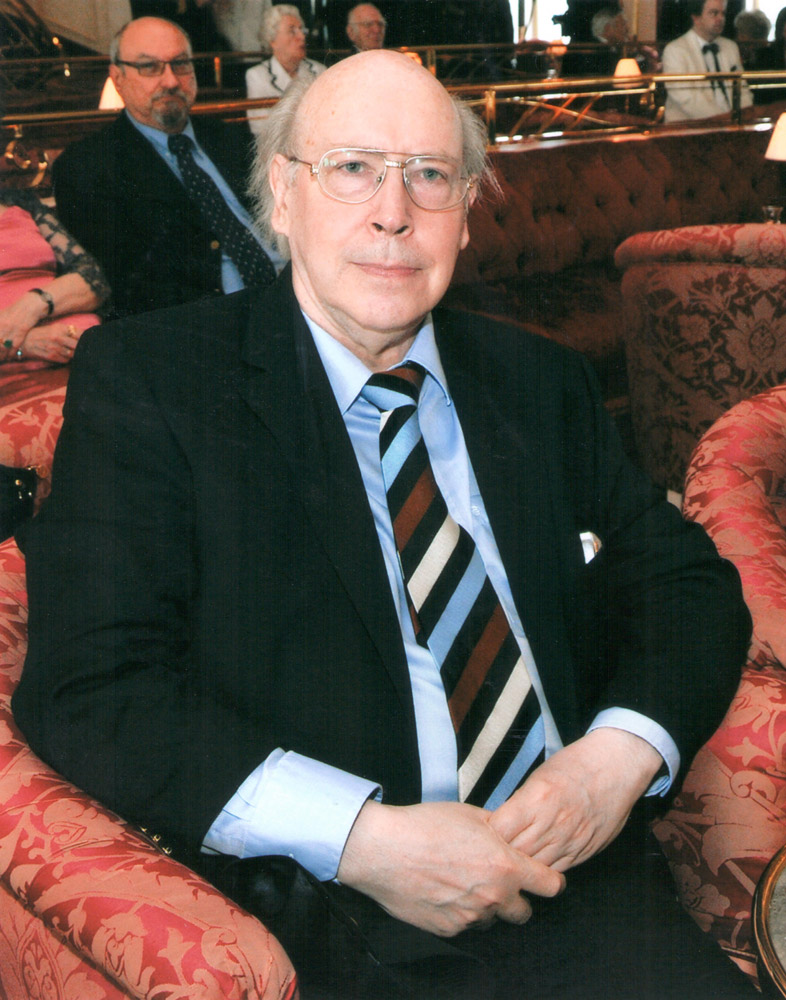
Siegmund Helms

== Life ==
Born in Nordhorn, Helms studied school music (including philosophy, psychology and education) and geography as well as musicology (including ethnomusicology) in Hanover, Marburg and Berlin from 1958. In 1967, his doctorate was awarded the a PhD degree from the Free University of Berlin with a dissertation on Die Melodiebildung in den Liedern von J. Brahms und ihr Verhältnis zu Volksliedern und volkstümlichen Weisen. He passed the first and second Staatsexamen in 1964 in Berlin and 1968 in Kassel. Afterwards he worked as a teacher in Göttingen.

From 1971 to 1974, Helms was a lecturer in music education at the Pädagogische Hochschule Bayreuth and from 1974 to 1977, a professor of music education at the Musikhochschule Frankfurt. Subsequently, he took over a professorship for music education at the Musikhochschule Köln until 2002, where he was appointed, among other things, head of the Institute for School Music and deputy director of the Musikhochschule Rheinland (name of the Hochschule für Musik und Tanz Köln from 1972 to 1987) and later also dean of the Department Musikpädagogik/Musikwissenschaft.

Helms was chairman of several German music education associations and a member of international committees. In addition, he was active as a journalist in many ways. He has been married since 1966 to the musicologist with a doctorate in musicology Marianne Helms née Henze.

== Publications ==
=== Books ===
- Schlager in Deutschland (ed.), Breitkopf & Härtel Wiesbaden 1972 ISBN 3-7651-0066-8
- Außereuropäische Musik, Breitkopf & Härtel Wiesbaden 1974 ISBN 3-7651-0080-3 (Swedish. translation, Stockholm 1985)
- Musik in der Werbung, Breitkopf & Härtel Wiesbaden 1981 ISBN 3-7651-0174-5
- Lexikon der Musikpädagogik. (ed. with H. Hopf and W. Heise), Bosse Verlag Regensburg 1984 ISBN 3-7649-2247-8
- Handbuch der Schulmusik (ed. with H. Hopf and E. Valentin), Bosse Verlag Regensburg 1985 ISBN 3-7649-2002-5
- Werkanalyse in Beispielen (ed. with H. Hopf), Bosse Verlag Regensburg 1986 ISBN 3-7649-2276-1
- Musikpädagogik und Musikwissenschaft (ed. with H. Hopf and A. Edler), Noetzel Verlag Wilhelmshaven 1987 ISBN 3-7959-0479-X
- Musikpädagogik – Spiegel der Kulturpolitik, Gustav Bosse Verlag Regensburg 1987, ISBN 3-76-4923-00-8
- Musikpädagogische Literatur 1977-1987 – Eine Auswahlbibliographie, Gustav Bosse Verlag Regensburg 1988, ISBN 3-7649-2335-0
- Musikpädagogik zwischen den Weltkriegen – Edmund Joseph Müller, Möseler Verlag Wolfenbüttel/Zürich 1988 ISBN 3-7877-3602-6
- Schülerbild – Lehrerbild – Musiklehrerausbildung (ed. with U. Günther), Verlag Die Blaue Eule Essen 1992, ISBN 3-89206-449-0
- Neues Lexikon der Musikpädagogik (ed. with R. Schneider and R. Weber), Sach- und Personenteil, Bosse Verlag Kassel 1994 and 2001 ISBN 3-7649-2541-8
- Kompendium der Musikpädagogik (ed. with R. Schneider), Bosse Verlag Kassel 1995, 2nd edition. 2000 ISBN 3-7649-2552-3
- Verwerfungen in der Gesellschaft – Verwandlungen in der Schule (ed. with B. Jank and N. Knolle), Wißner Verlag Augsburg 1996, ISBN 3-89639-034-1
- Handbuch des Musikunterrichts (3 volumes) (ed. with R. Schneider and R. Weber), Bosse Verlag Kassel 1997 ISBN 3-7649-2671-6, ISBN 3-7649-2672-4, ISBN 3-7649-2673-2
- Lübbes Musical-Führer (ed. with M. Kruse and R. Schneider), Gustav Lübbe Verlag Bergisch Gladbach 1998 ISBN 3-404-60445-8
- Praxisfelder der Musikpädagogik (ed. by R. Schneider and R. Weber), Bosse Verlag Kassel 2001 ISBN 3-7649-2674-0
- Allgemein bildende Schule und Musikschule in europäischen Ländern (ed.), Bosse Verlag Kassel 2002, ISBN 3-7649-2467-5
- Die große Musikschule – Kinder und Jugendliche lernen musizieren. (ed.), Naumann & Göbel Cologne 2003 ISBN 3-625-21125-4
- Das grosse Buch der Kinderlieder (ed.), Naumann & Göbel Cologne 2004 ISBN 3-625-10599-3
- Liederbuch für Kinder (ed.), Schwager & Steinlein Verlag Cologne o.-J.
- Lexikon der Musikpädagogik (ed. with R. Schneider and R. Weber), Bosse Verlag Kassel 2005 (completely revised new edition) ISBN 3-7649-2540-X
- Die schönsten Volks- und Wanderlieder (ed.), Komet Verlag Köln 2006 ISBN 3-89836-520-4
- Heinrich Helms: "Nun gute Nacht, meine Lieben!" – Briefe aus dem Zweiten Weltkrieg (ed.), Verlag Monsenstein und Vannerdat Münster 2006, ISBN 978-3-86582-291-8

=== Other publications ===
- Approx. 100 essays, including:
- Zahlen in J. S. Bachs Matthäus-Passion, in Musik und Kirche, issue 1–2, 1970, pp. 18–27 and 100–110 (as well as Zahlensymbolik in der Musik Bachs, in Musik und Bildung, issue 3/1970, pp. 113–116)
- Johannes Brahms und das deutsche Kirchenlied, in Der Kirchenmusiker, issue 2/1970, pp. 39–48
- Brahms und Bach, in Bach-Jahrbuch 1971, pp. 13–81
- Stilmerkmale japanischer Musik, in Musik und Bildung, issue 1/1975, pp. 218–227
- Musikpädagogik und außereuropäische Musik, in Musik und Bildung, issue 4/1976, pp. 192–195
- Musikpädagogik und Musikgeschichte, in D. Altenburg (ed.): Ars musica – Musica scientia (Fs. for H. Hüschen), Verlag Gitarre und Laute Köln 1980, pp. 240–245
- Musiklehrerausbildung in der Bundesrepublik Deutschland zwischen Kunstanspruch und Schulalltag, in Journal der Musikhochschule Köln, Nr. 1 / 1982, pp. 4f.
- Zum Stand der vergleichenden Musikpädagogik, in R. Klinkhammer (ed.): Schnittpunkte Mensch – Musik, Bosse Verlag Regensburg 1985, pp. 180–184
- Auge und Ohr – Zur Visualisierung von Musik und Musikalisierung von Bildern, in Musik und Unterricht, issue 2/1990, pp. 2–11
- Das Instrument in der Musikpädagogik, in Musik und Unterricht, issue 6/1991, pp. 2–8
- Wirkungen von Musik, in Musik und Unterricht, issue 18/1993, p. 3
- Schrift und Klang, in Musik und Unterricht, issue 24/1994, pp. 4–9
- Lexikon-Artikel, Berichte, Rezensionen sowie Schulfunksendungen für den NDR
- Editionen (Works by J. Brahms and J. H. Schein)

=== Co-editor of publication series and journals ===
- Materialien zur Didaktik und Methodik des Musikunterrichts (edited with G. Rebscher and N. Linke), Breitkopf & Härtel Wiesbaden
- Perspektiven zur Musikpädagogik und Musikwissenschaft (edited with W. Gieseler und R. Schneider), Bosse Verlag Regensburg / Kassel
- Musikwerke im Unterricht (edited with Kl. Velten), Bosse Verlag Regensburg / Kassel
- Materialien für den Musikunterricht (edited by R. Schneider), Con Brio Verlagsgesellschaft Regensburg
- Musikpraxis in der Schule (edited with R. Schneider), Bosse Verlag Kassel
- Zeitschrift für Musikpädagogik (Schriftleiter with R. Weber among others), Bosse Verlag Regensburg
- Zeitschrift Musik und Unterricht (edited with W. Gruhn, Fr. Hoffmann, R. Schneider, R. Weber), Friedrich Verlag Velber bei Hannover (from 1990 to 1998)
- Internet-Zeitschrift Europäisches Musik Journal (European Music Journal) (edited with W. Gruhn and R. Schneider), Verlag für Neue Medien Freiburg i. Br. (from 1999 to 2000)
