= University of Hildesheim =

Public university in Lower Saxony, Germany

- Universität Hildesheim
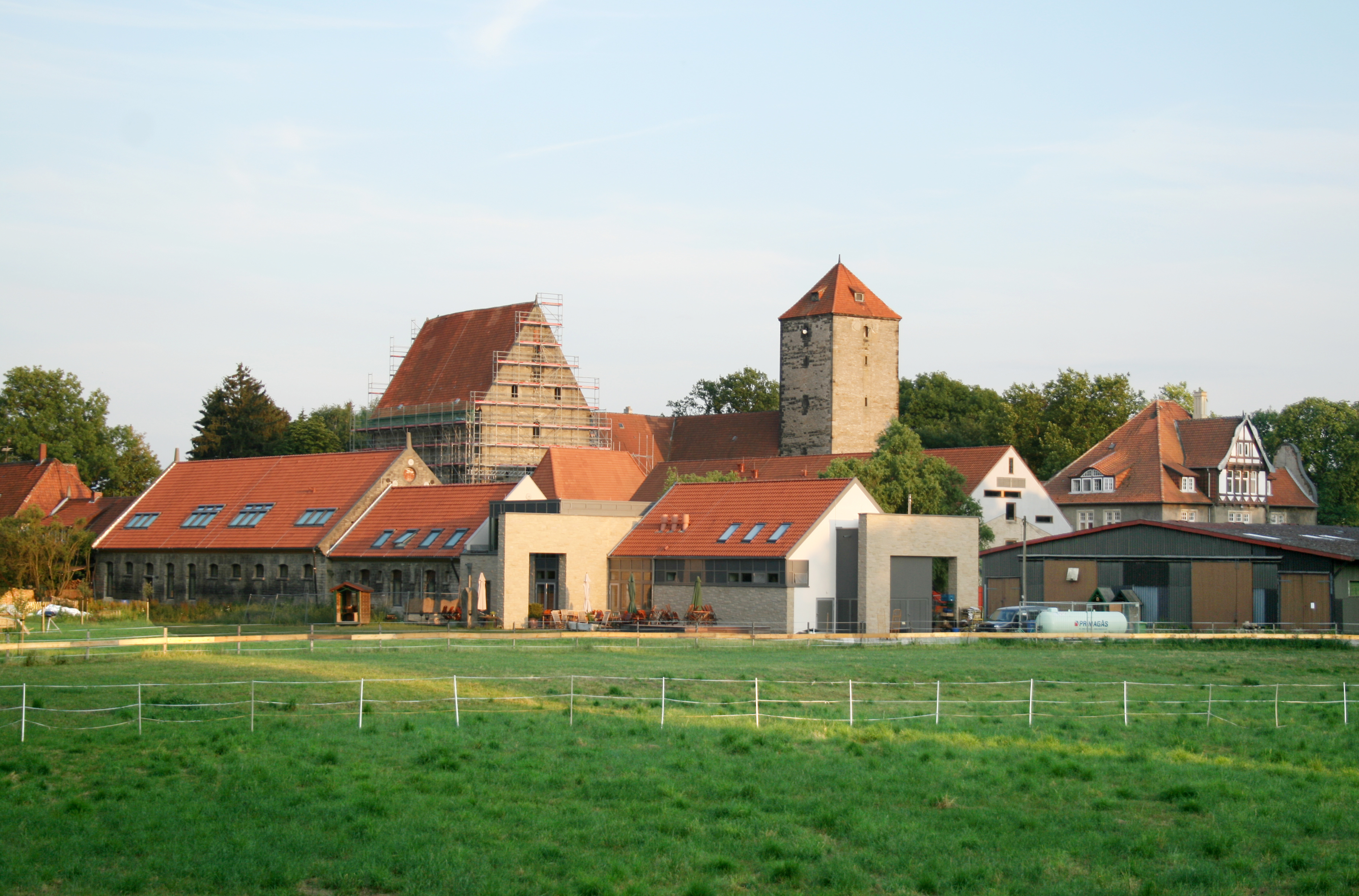
- Kulturcampus Domäne Marienburg
- Type: Public
- Established: 1946/2003
- President: May-Britt Kallenrode
- Academic staff: 840
- Students: 8.574 (winter semester 2021/22)
- Location: Hildesheim, Lower Saxony, Germany; 52°08′00″N 9°58′30″E
- Website: www.uni-hildesheim.de/

The University of Hildesheim (in German Universität Hildesheim) is a public university located in Hildesheim, in the German state of Lower Saxony.

== History ==
=== Alfeld University of Education (Pädagogische Hochschule Alfeld) – University of Hildesheim ===
The University of Hildesheim originated from the University of Education in Alfeld established in 1946. Because of the massive destruction of the city of Hildesheim during the Second World War, the university was relocated to Alfeld, which remained mostly intact. Under its director Hans Abmeier, 110 students were registered in the university in its first academic year in 1946/47, and approximately 50 students for several years after that. The aim of the university was to provide teachers for the Catholic population in the British zone, without religion being a necessary condition for admission. Hans-Otto Knackstedt, chaplain, taught Catholic theology, and Otto Brauckmann, musical director in cathedrals, taught music in the university. Under the director and Catholic philosopher Franz Flintrop, the Alfeld University of Education became independent from the Ministry of Education and finally, under rector Günter Klages, it was relocated back to Hildesheim in 1970 as a department of the University of Education of Lower Saxony (Pädagogische Hochschule Niedersachsen). In 1978 the university became independent once again and was named as Scientific University of Hildesheim under rector Heinz-Wilhelm Alten. In 1989, it was renamed University of Hildesheim by the rector Reinhard Göllner. Ulla Bosse was its first president serving from 1998 until 2002.

=== Public Foundation University of Hildesheim (Stiftungsuniversität) ===
On 1 January 2003, the sponsorship of the University of Hildesheim was transferred from the state of Lower Saxony to the public Foundation University of Hildesheim becoming one of the first public universities in Germany. Four other universities in Lower Saxony followed the lead of the University of Hildesheim at the same time, namely the Universities of Göttingen and Lüneburg, the University of Applied Sciences of Osnabrück and the University of Veterinary Medicine Hannover. The current president of the foundation is May-Britt Kallenrode.

The number of students in the University of Hildesheim reached 8574 in the winter semester 2021/22. The Department of Education has the highest number of students in the University of Hildesheim, teaching approximately 3.200 students (from which about 19 percent come from different federal states), while the Department of Cultural Studies comes second teaching approximately 1100 students (from which about 34 percent come from different federal states).

Female students make up about 69 percent of the student body in the university. Furthermore, the number of female professors reaches up to 40 percent exceeding the national average. Equality between women and men, as well as between people of different social, ethnic and religious backgrounds, is an important principle of the University of Hildesheim. Its equality concept was positively reviewed in both rounds of the third phase of the Program for Female Professors, initiated by the Federal Ministry of Education and Research (BMBF) and the other federal states (2008, 2013).

=== Rectors and Presidents ===
The following rectors and presidents were the Head of the University of Hildesheim:

Alfeld University of Education 1945–1969

- 1945–1953: Johannes (Hans) Abmeier, rector
- 1953–1956: Franz Pasternak, rector
- 1956–1959: Hans-Otto Knackstedt, Head of the university
- 1959–1962: Franz Flintrop, Head of the university
- 1962–1966: Wilhelm Rückriem, Head, ab 1963 rector
- 1966–1967: Werner Trillmich, rector
- 1967–1969: Heinrich Maiworm, rector
- 1969: Günther Klages, rector

Deans of the University of Education Lower Saxony- Department of Hildesheim 1969–1978

- 1969–1971: Günter Klages
- 1971–1973: Fro Trommsdorff
- 1973–1976: Dieter Lüttge
- 1976–1978: Heinz-Wilhelm Alten
- 1978: Herbert Kraatz

Rectors of the Scientific University of Hildesheim 1978–1989

- 1978–1979: Herbert Kraatz, appointed rector
- 1979–1981: Heinz-Wilhelm Alten, mathematician, first elected rector of the Scientific University of Hildesheim
- 1981–1983: Dieter Lüttge, psychologist, rector of the Scientific University of Hildesheim
- 1983–1985: Theodor Kreutzkamp, mathematician, rector of the Scientific University of Hildesheim
- 1985–1989: Reinhard Göllner, theologian, rector of the Scientific University of Hildesheim and first rector of the University of Hildesheim

Rectors and presidents of the University of Hildesheim 1989–2002

- 1989–1991: Ernst Cloer, educationalist, rector of the University of Hildesheim
- 1991–1995: Rudolf Weber, musicologist, rector of the University of Hildesheim
- 1995–1998: Wolfgang Menzel, German philologist and educator, rector of the University of Hildesheim
- 1998–2002: Ulla Bosse, psychologist, first president of the University of Hildesheim
- 2002–2003: Wolfgang-Uwe Friedrich, political scientist, president of the University of Hildesheim

Presidents of the public Foundation University of Hildesheim since 2003

- 2003–2020: Wolfgang-Uwe Friedrich, political scientist, president of the public Foundation University of Hildesheim
- 1 January 2021 – present: May-Britt Kallenrode, physicist, president of the public Foundation University of Hildesheim

== Faculties and institutes ==
The University of Hildesheim is organized into four departments, from which 27 institutes have been established.

=== Faculty 1: Educational and Social Sciences ===
- Institute of Education Studies (Dept. of Applied Education Studies, Dept. of General Educational Studies)
- Institute of Elementary School Didactics and General Science
- Institute of Psychology
- Institute of Social Sciences
- Institute of Catholic Theology
- Institute of Protestant Theology
- Institute of History
- Institute of Social and Organizational Education
- Institute of Sport Science

=== Faculty 2: Cultural Studies and Aesthetic Communication ===
- Institute of Cultural politics
- Institute of Philosophy
- Institute of literary Writing and literary Studies
- Institute of Media, Theatre and popular Culture
- Institute of Music and Musicology
- Institute of Visual Arts and Art science

=== Faculty 3: Linguistics and Information Science ===
- Institute of German language and Literature
- Institute of English language and Literature
- Institute of intercultural Communication
- Institute of Translation Studies and Specialized Communication
- Institute of Information Studies and Language Technology

=== Faculty 4: Mathematics, Natural Sciences, Economics and Computer Science ===
- Institute of Biology and Chemistry
- Institute of Geography
- Institute of Physics
- Institute of Engineering
- Institute of Mathematics and Applied Computer Sciences
- Institute of Computer Studies

== Range of studies ==
The four different departments of the University of Hildesheim provide many different courses of studies. The first department teaches psychology, educational science and social pedagogy and the courses mainly take place in the main campus. The second department is associated with cultural studies, creative writing and scenic arts and the courses take place on the cultural campus of Domäne Marienburg. The third department focuses on languages and communication. An example of this department is the study program "International Communication and Translation". Furthermore, the fourth department offers IT and environmental science courses. Teacher education for elementary, secondary and intermediate schools can be studied in all four departments and its range of studies includes 18 subjects. In total, the University of Hildesheim offers more than 40 Bachelor's and Master's programs, including the English-speaking Master's program "Data Analytics".

According to the winter semester 2021/22 student records, 69 percent of the total 8,574 students of the University of Hildesheim are female, a number exceeding significantly the national average for universities in Germany (52 percent). 3214 students are registered in the Department of Education, of which 2188 students are female (68%). The Department of Cultural studies comprises 13 percent of the total students of the University of Hildesheim, of which 819 are female. The IT department offering the study programs of "Applied Computer Science", "Data Analytics" and "Business Informatics" comprises 6 percent of the total students, with 505 students enrolled, of which 34 percent are women (171 female students). In 2022, 1637 students graduated from the University of Hildesheim, and 48 doctoral programs were successfully completed.

== Notable Professors ==
- Silvio Vietta (born 1941), literary scholar
- Hanns-Josef Ortheil (born 1951), author und Germanist
- Michael Gehler (born 1962), historian
- Joachim Friedmann (born 1966), dramaturg

== See also ==
- List of colleges and universities
- Hildesheim
