= Marianne Helms =

German musicologist (1936–2026)

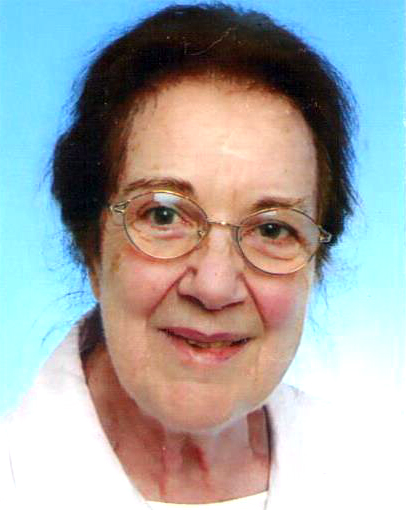
Marianne Helms in 2018

Marianne Helms (née Henze; 3 July 1936 – 17 October 2026) was a German musicologist.

== Life and career ==
Born in Berlin, Helms studied musicology (historical musicology and ethnomusicology) and medieval and modern history at the Free University of Berlin from 1955, where she received her doctorate in 1964 with a dissertation on the masses of Johannes Ockeghem.

From 1965 to 1967, she was a research assistant at the Musicological Institute there. From autumn 1967 to 1978, she worked as a research assistant at the Johann Sebastian Bach Institute in Göttingen and in 1979 at the Beethoven Archive in Bonn.

From 1980, she was a member of the Joseph Haydn Institute in Cologne. She worked there as a research assistant and archivist, most recently (from July 1997 to the end of 1998) as scientific director. In retirement (since 1999), she continued to work as an editor on volumes of the Complete Haydn Edition.

In 1966 Helms married musicologist and music educator Siegmund Helms (later professor at the Cologne Academy of Music). Her dissertation was published under her maiden name (Henze).

Helms died on 17 October 2026, at the age of 90.

== Publications ==
=== Editions ===
==== Total scientific expenditure ====
- Johann Hermann Schein: Venuskränzlein 1609, Studentenschmaus 1626 (together with Siegmund Helms), Kassel among others 1970 (New Edition of Complete Works, vol. 6)
- Johann Sebastian Bach: Cantatas for the Feast of Michaelmas', Kassel among others 1973 (New Edition of Complete Works, Series I, vol. 30, Sheet Music)
- Johann Sebastian Bach: Cantatas for Michaelmas, Kassel among others 1974 (New Edition of Complete Works, Series I, vol. 30, Critical Report)
- Johann Sebastian Bach: Cantatas for the Feast of the Epiphany, up to the 2nd Sunday after Epiphany, Kassel among others 1975 (New Edition of Complete Works, Series I, Vol. 5, Score)
- Johann Sebastian Bach: Cantatas for the Feast of the Epiphany, until the 2nd Sunday after Epiphany, Kassel et al. 1976 (New Edition of Complete Works, Series I, Vol. 5, Critical Report)
- Johann Sebastian Bach: Lutheran Masses and Individual Mass Movements (together with Emil Platen), Kassel et al. 1978 (New Edition of Complete Works, series II, Vol. 2, Score)
- Johann Sebastian Bach: Lutheran Masses and Individual Mass Movements (together with Emil Platen), Kassel et al. 1982 (New Edition of Complete Works, series II, Vol. 2, Critical Report)
- Joseph Haydn: Songs for a Singing Voice with Piano Accompaniment, Munich 1983 (Joseph Haydn Werke, Series XXIX, Vol. 1, Critical Report)
- Joseph Haydn: Various Songs with Piano Accompaniment, Munich 1988 (Joseph Haydn Werke, series XXIX, vol. 2, Notenband mit Kritischem Bericht sowie Übertragung der Skizzen zu den Liedern in Reihe XXIX, vol. 1)
- Joseph Haydn: Stabat Mater 1767 (together with Fred Stoltzfus), Munich 1993 (Joseph Haydn Werke, Series XXII, vol. 1, music volume with critical report)
- Joseph Haydn: Masses No. 3-4 ("Große Orgelsolomesse", "Nikolaimesse") and Fragment der Missa Sunt bona mixta malis (together with James Dack), Munich 1999 (Joseph Haydn Werke, series XXIII, vol. 2, music volume with critical report)
- Joseph Haydn: Verschiedene kirchenmusikalische Werke, 1. Folge, Munich 2017 (Joseph Haydn Werke, series XXII, vol. 2, music volume with critical report, preface with contribution Haydn as director of Esterházy's church music)
- Joseph Haydn: Verschiedene kirchenmusikalische Werke, 2. Folge (together with Andreas Friesenhagen), Munich 2018 (Joseph Haydn Werke, Reihe XXII, vol. 3; music volume with critical report)

Practical sheet music

- Joseph Haydn: Lieder für Singstimme und Klavier, original text, G. Henle Verlag, Munich 1982
- Joseph Haydn: Arianna a Naxos, Cantata a voce sola, Gesang und Klavier, original text, G. Henle Verlag, Munich 1990
- Joseph Haydn: Zwei Duette, soprano, tenor and piano, original text, G. Henle Verlag, Munich 1991

=== Publications ===
- Studien zu den Messenkompositionen Johannes Ockeghems, (Berliner Studien zur Musikwissenschaft, vol. 12), Berlin 1968 (zugleich Dissertation, Freie Universität Berlin 1964)
- Zur Chronologie der Handschrift des Anonymus 5, Anhang 1 in Johann Sebastian Bach: Neue Ausgabe Sämtlicher Werke, series V, vol. 7: English Suite, Kritischer Bericht by Alfred Dürr.
- Zur Entstehung des zweiten Teils der 24 Deutschen Lieder, in Internationaler Joseph Haydn Kongress Wien 1982. Bericht, edited by Eva Badura Skoda, Munich 1986, pp. 126–123
- Ein Schwesterwerk der "Nelsonmesse"? Zur Edition von Haydns Te Deum Hob. XXIIIc.2, in Haydn-Studien (Veröffentlichungen des Joseph Haydn-Instituts, Köln), IX, 1–4 (2006), pp. 157–175}
- Das Te Deum Hob. XXIIIc.1 / Klafsky V,3. Eines der sowohl Joseph als auch Michael Haydn zugeschriebenen Werke, in Johann Michael Haydn, Werk und Wirkung. Referate des Michael-Haydn-Kongresses Salzburg from 20 until 22 October 2006, edited by Petrus Eder OSB und Manfred Hermann Schmid, Munich2010, pp. 57–75
- Zahlreiche Beiträge, darunter die Basis-Artikel Kirchenmusik and Lieder. In Das Haydn-Lexikon. edited by Armin Raab, Christine Siegert and Wolfram Steinbeck, Laaber 2010.
