= Rolf Fritz =

German art historian (1904–1992)

Rolf Fritz (April 15, 1904, in Hofgeismar – September 2, 1992, in Münster) was a German art historian. His research focused on German art from the Middle Ages to the 19th century, especially on the art and cultural history of Westphalia, as well as on various genres of arts and crafts.

== Life ==
Rolf Fritz was born in Hesse of a Strasbourg family and grew up in Dortmund. After completing his training as an elementary school teacher in Hilchenbach (Siegerland), he studied art history, history, classical archaeology and philosophy in Berlin and Vienna and received his doctorate in 1930 with Adolph Goldschmidt in Berlin with the dissertation "Das Stadt- und Straßenbild in der holländischen Malerei des 17. Jahrhunderts" (The city and street scene in 17th century Dutch painting).

First, he spent a year as an assistant to Cornelis Hofstede de Groot in The Hague. This was followed by work as a volunteer at various departments of the Berlin museums, including the Near Eastern Department, the Gemäldegalerie and the Museum of Decorative Arts, which was then located in the Berlin Palace.

In 1934 Fritz became a curator at the Städtisches Museum in Dortmund, and from 1936 to 1966 was its director. The museum was renamed the Museum für Kunst und Kulturgeschichte or MKK (Museum of Art and Cultural History)

From 1940 to 1945 Fritz served in the German army as a French and Dutch interpreter. Postwar he worked on the repatriation of art. The museum building had been completely destroyed. Items were stored and exhibited in Cappenberg Castle near Lünen. "The British military government confirmed Rolf Fritz in his office on January 22, 1946". The British art protection officers helped Fritz to show exhibitions and arrange restorations, including of precious medieval works of art from Dortmund churches, starting in 1948. The exhibitions were praised by Carl Georg Heise in 1950 as "the miracle of Cappenberg".

In 1949 and 1950, the most precious works of medieval art from Germany were shown at museums exhibitions in the Amsterdam, Brussels and Paris. Most of the works of art had been removed from storage during the war, and because of destruction of buildings, could not be returned to their original locations. The British art conservation officers (Monuments Men and Monuments, Fine Arts, and Archives Section, respectively) also made these exhibitions possible. Rolf Fritz dealt with loans from Dortmund churches.

The exhibitions during the summer months at Cappenberg Castle formed the essential part of his museum work.

- Kunstschätze aus zerstörten Kirchen Westfalens, 1948.
- Rembrandt und seine Zeitgenossen. Handzeichnungen aus den Museen von Amsterdam und Brüssel, 1949.
- Conrad von Soest und sein Kreis, 1950.
- Deutsche Kultur von der Spätgotik bis zum Rokoko. Ausstellung mit Leihgaben aus dem Germanischen Nationalmuseum Nürnberg, 1951.
- Meisterwerke niederländischer Malerei aus der Alten Pinakothek München, 1952.
- Das Ruhrgebiet vor hundert Jahren, 1955.
- Das Bild der deutschen Industrie 1800–1850, 1958.

A complete bibliography of Rolf Fritz, including a detailed tribute to his museum work, was published by the Dortmund City and State Library in 1979 on the occasion of his 75th birthday. It includes writings on the following areas: 1. iconography, 2. German painting of the 14th to 19th centuries, 3. sculpture of the 11th to 16th centuries, 4. German drawings of the 15th to 19th centuries, 5. arts and crafts of the 13th to 18th centuries, 6. Dortmund and the old art on the Hellweg, 7. Ruhr area, 8. Dutch painting, 9. museum writings and reports.

Fritz' son, born in 1936, is the art historian Johann Michael Fritz.

From May 15, 2015, to May 14, 2018, the Museum für Kunst und Kulturgeschichte undertook a project to index the collection, with the objective of clarifying the "provenance of paintings and sculptures acquired during the "Rolf Fritz era" (1934-1966)." The museum organised an exhibition about the provenances entitled, "Herr Fritz, woher stammen die Bilder? Ausstellung zur Provenienzforschung im MKK Dortmund".

== Publications (selection) ==
Monographs

- Das Stadt- und Straßenbild in der holländischen Malerei des 17. Jahrhunderts. Stuttgart 1932.
- Dortmunder Kirchen und ihre Kunstschätze. Dortmund 1933.
- Conrad von Soest. Der Dortmunder Marienaltar. Bremen 1950.
- Conrad von Soest. Der Wildunger Altar. München 1954.
- Dortmunder Kunstbesitz. Museum für Kunst und Kulturgeschichte. Erwerbungen 1934–1958. Ausstellung zum 75jährigen Bestehen des Museums. Dortmund 1958.
- Heinrich Aldegrever als Maler. Dortmund 1959.
- Das Ruhrgebiet vor hundert Jahren. Dortmund 1956. 3. Auflage, 1963.
- Dortmund. Bilder aus vier Jahrhunderten. Dortmund 1956, 3. Auflage 1965.
- Museum für Kunst und Kulturgeschichte der Stadt Dortmund. Hamburg 1964 (= Kulturgeschichtliche Museen in Deutschland, Band 4)
- Meisterwerke alter Kunst aus Dortmund. Dortmund 1967, 2. Auflage 1980.
- Sammlung Becker. Gemälde alter Meister. Dortmund 1967.
- Alte Kunst im Kreis Unna. Köln-Berlin 1970, 2. erweiterte Auflage 1977.
- Sammlung August Neresheimer. Katalog. Hamburg-Altona 1974.
- Die Gefäße aus Kokosnuss in Mitteleuropa. 1250–1800. Mainz 1983.

Essays (selection)

- Das Halbfigurenbild in der westdeutschen Tafelmalerei um 1400. In: Zeitschrift für Kunstwissenschaft. Jahrgang 5, 1951, S. 161–178.
- Aquilegia. Die symbolische Bedeutung der Akelei. In: Wallraf-Richartz-Jahrbuch. Band 14, 1952, S. 99–110.
- Conrad von Soest als Zeichner. In: Westfalen. Band 31, 1953, S. 10.
- Die Ikonographie des heiligen Gottfried von Cappenberg. In: Westfälische Zeitschrift. Band 111, 1961, S. 1–20.
- Der Crucifixus aus Benninghausen, ein Bildwerk des 11. Jahrhunderts. In: Westfalen. Band 29, 1951, S. 141–153.
- Der Crucifixus von Cappenberg, ein Meisterwerk französischer Bildhauerkunst. In: Westfalen. Band 31, 1953, S. 204–218.
- Dortmunder Goldschmiede der Barockzeit. In: Peter Berghaus: Dortmunder Münzgeschichte, Dortmund 1958, S. 53–83.
- Eine spätgotische Pilgerflasche zur Aachener Heiligtumsfahrt. In: Aachener Kunstblätter. Jahrgang 22, 1961, S. 75–82.

== Literature ==
- Bewahrer – Entdecker – Vermittler. Dr. Rolf Fritz zum 75. Geburtstag. Hrsg. von Hans Rudi Vitt, Stadt- und Landesbibliothek Dortmund, Neue Folge, Heft 12, Dortmund 1979. Darin: Otto Königsberger, Rolf Fritz zum 75. Geburtstag, S. 11–16; Bibliographie S. 27–43.
- Paul Pieper: Rolf Fritz 1904 bis 1992. In Westfalen. 71, 1993, S. 275–279 (mit Bibliographie).
- Menschen in Selm, Bork und Cappenberg. Herausgegeben von der Bürgerstiftung Stadt Selm, Selm 2015, S. 90 f.
