= Sybille Waury =

German actress (born 1970)

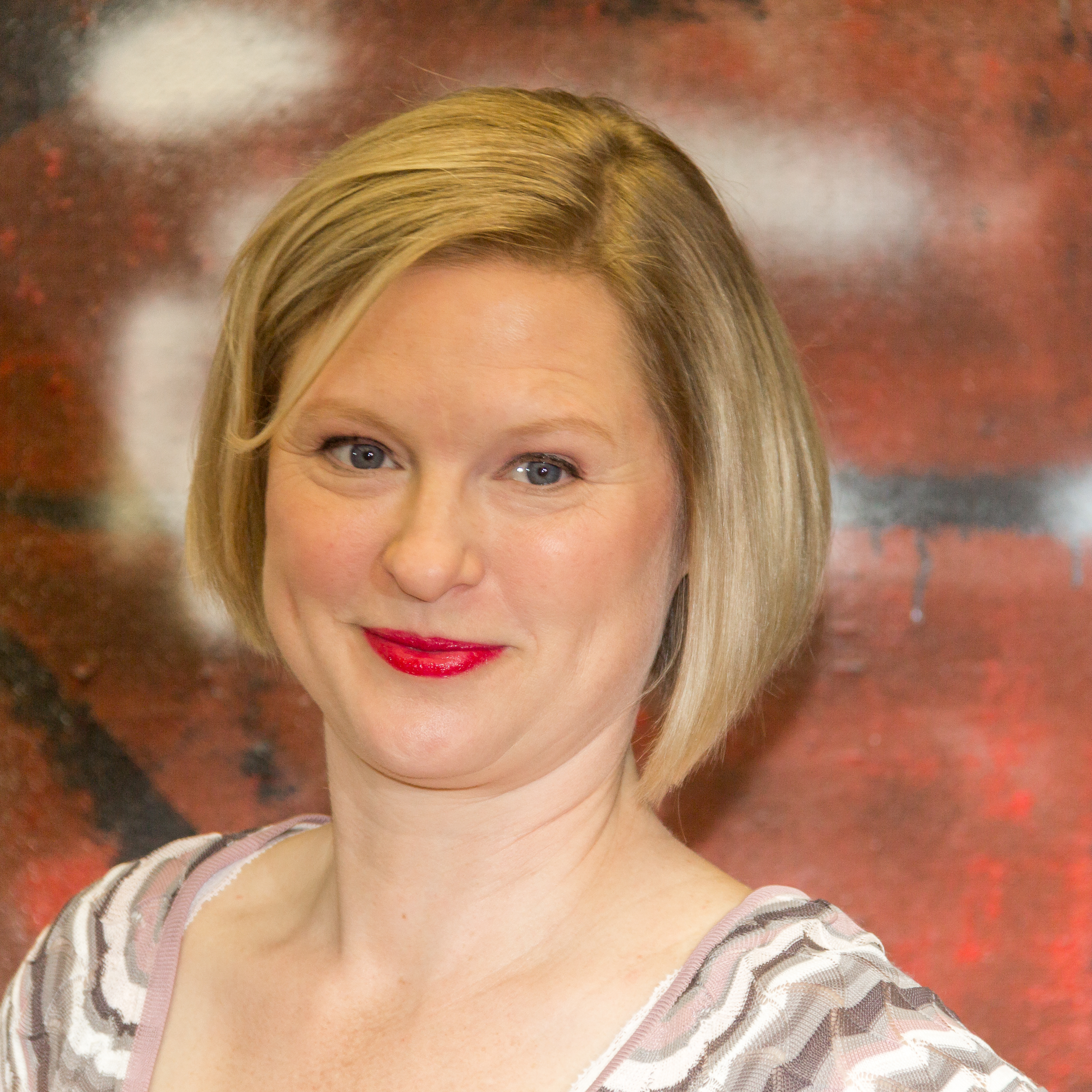
Waury in 2015

Sybille Waury (born 9 May 1970) is a German actress.

== Biography ==
She is probably best known for her portrayal of Tanja Schildknecht in the German TV-series Lindenstraße (since 1985). She also starred as Dorothée in the Schulz & Schulz-movies next to Götz George and Martina Gedeck. She also played in the movies Money by Doris Dörrie and The Invincibles by Dominik Graf. Her stage roles include Abigail Williams in The Crucible; Mowgli in The Jungle Book and others.

Waury is married to German writer Joachim Friedmann.
