= Museum für Kunst und Kulturgeschichte =

Municipal museum in Dortmund, Germany

Coordinates: 51°30′59″N 7°27′47″E

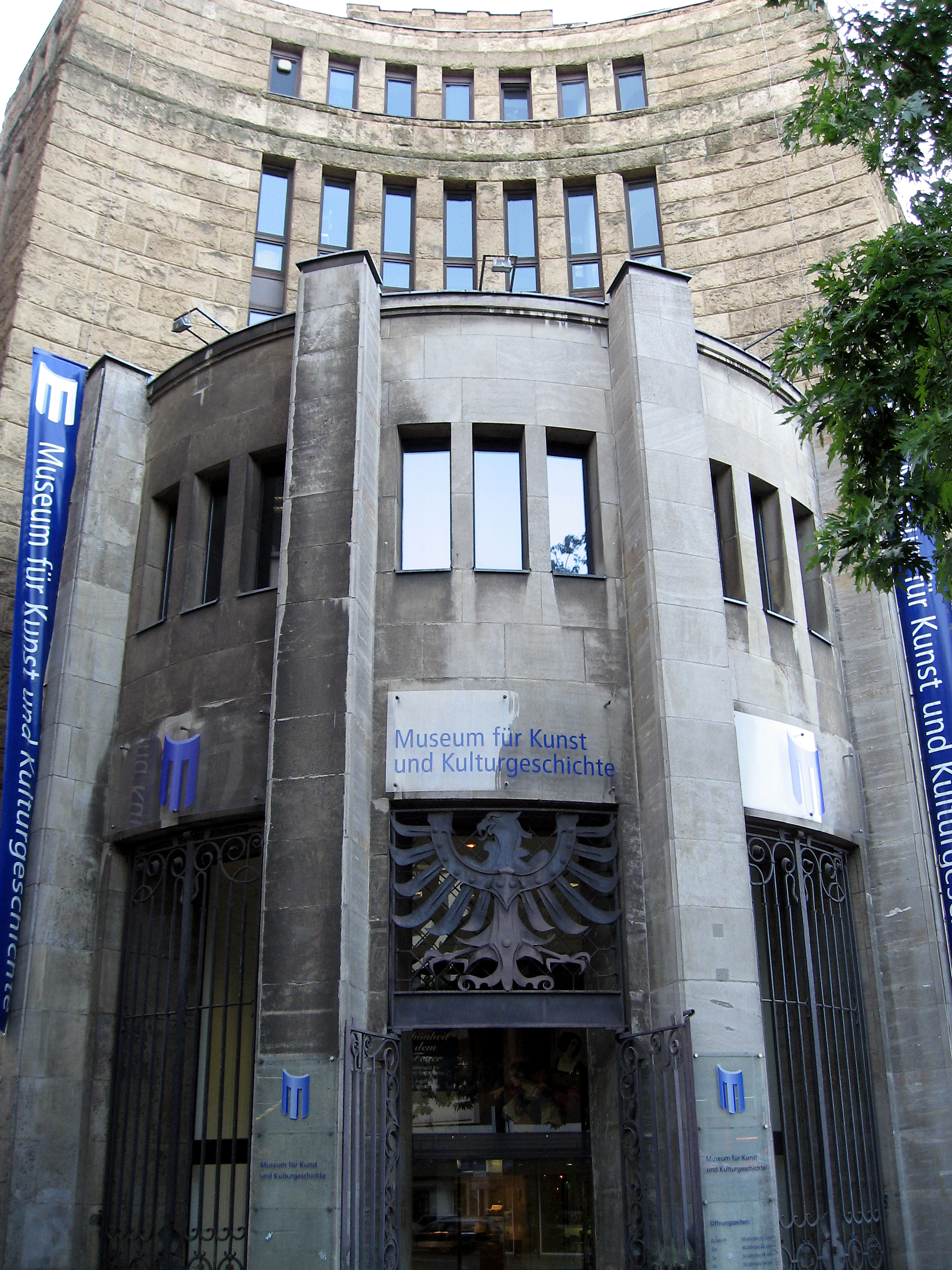
The Museum für Kunst und Kulturgeschichte: entrance.

Museum für Kunst und Kulturgeschichte, Dortmund

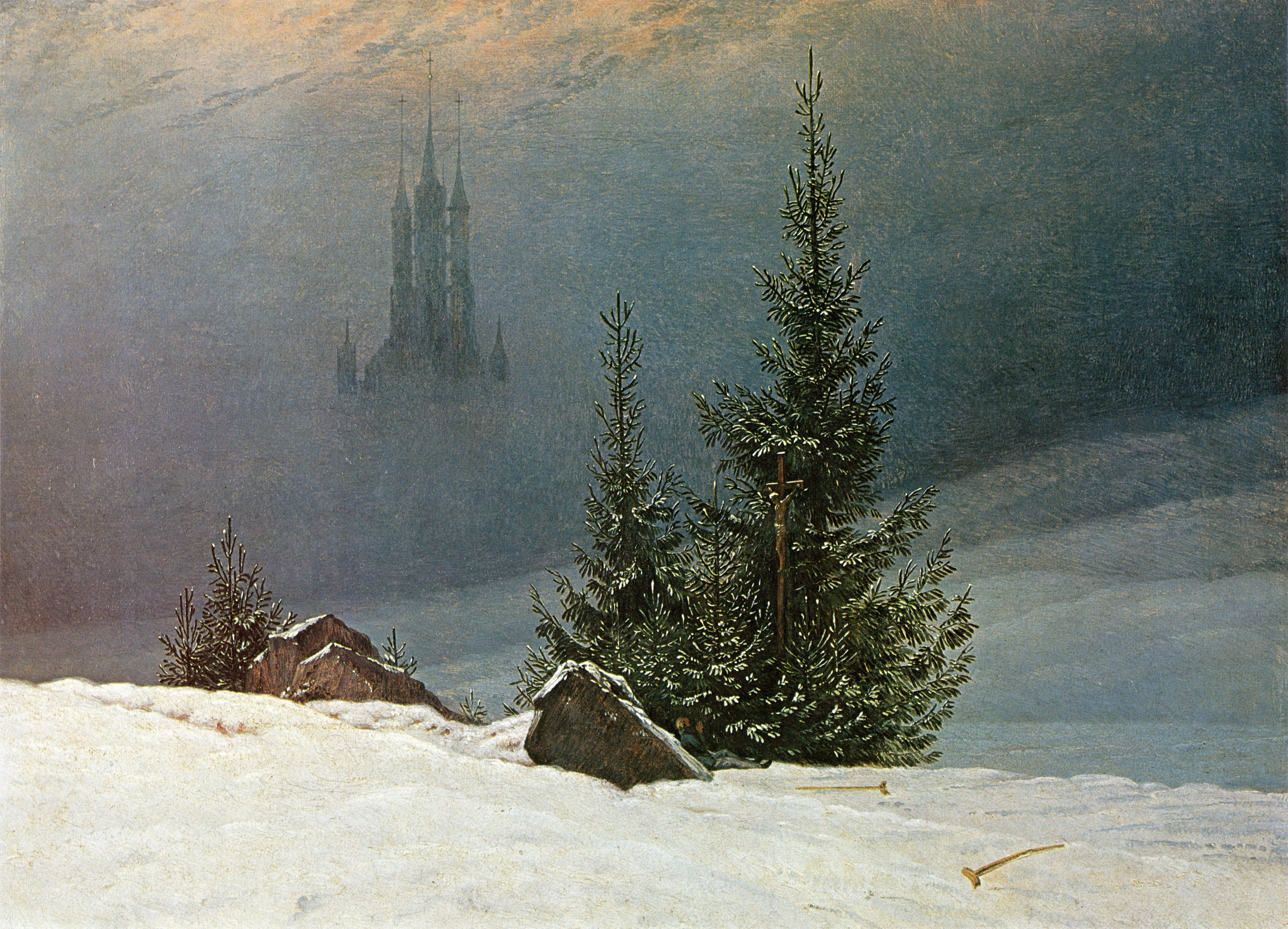
Caspar David Friedrich: Winterlandschaft (1811).

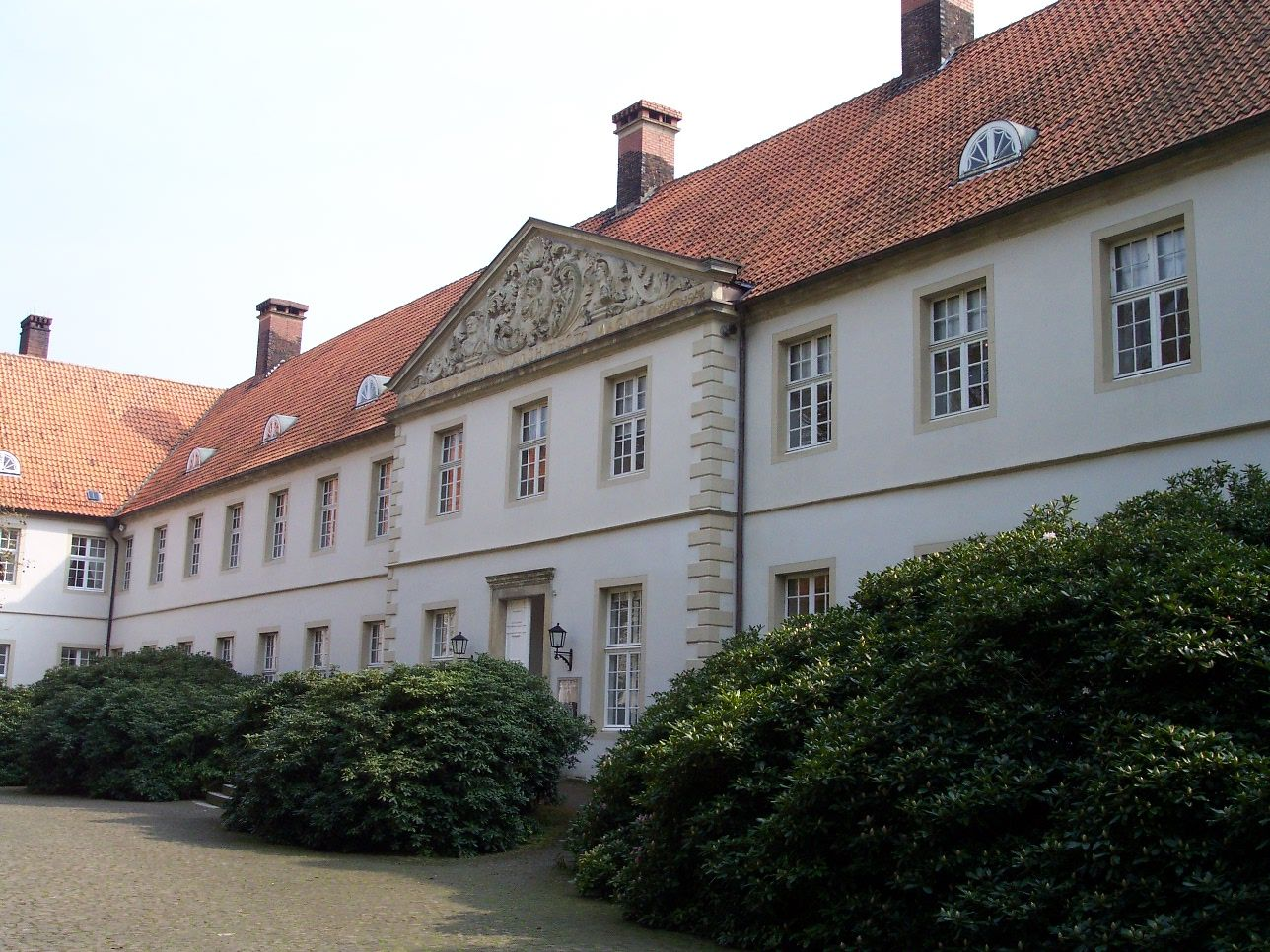
Cappenberg Castle (the old location): main building.

The Museum für Kunst und Kulturgeschichte or MKK (Museum of Art and Cultural History) is a municipal museum in Dortmund, Germany. It is currently located in an Art Deco building which was formerly the Dortmund Savings Bank.

The collection includes paintings, sculptures, furniture and applied art, illustrating the cultural history of Dortmund from early times to the 20th century. There are regular temporary exhibitions of art and culture, as well as a permanent exhibition on the history of surveying, with rare geodetic instruments.

== History ==
It was founded in 1883 as a collection of historical and artistic objects. It changed location several times in the early years, and came to include archaeological finds, decorative artworks and local historical artefacts. It was reoriented as a fine art museum in the 1930s, with the acquisition of Romantic paintings in particular.

Rolf Fritz directed the museum from 1936 to 1966. The collection was evacuated during the war, and survived almost unharmed. The building, however, was destroyed, so the collection was moved into Cappenberg Castle in 1946. (The ruins of the old site were rebuilt into the Museum am Ostwall.) During this time the MKK was put in charge of artworks evacuated from various bombed Westphalian churches, including Conrad von Soest's Mary Altar from St. Mary's Church in Dortmund.

In the 1960s and '70s the MKK acquired examples of Westphalian furniture, documenting the history of furnishing from the Gothic to Art Nouveau. In 1983 it moved into its present location, an Art Deco former bank built in 1924. The director from 1982 to 1986 was Gerhard Langemeyer, the future Lord Mayor of Dortmund.

== Exhibitions ==
The permanent exhibitions are Kulturgeschichte im Zeitraffer ("Cultural History in Time-Lapse"), Die kleine Nationalgalerie (an annexe of the Alte Nationalgalerie in Berlin), and the exhibition on the history of surveying. The sections are ordered chronologically, from "Back to the Stone Age" and "Antiques" through to "The New City".

The permanent collection of 19th-century paintings includes works by Caspar David Friedrich (Winter Landscape and The Temple of Juno in Agrigento), Max Slevogt, Lovis Corinth and Anton von Werner. Some of the previous temporary exhibitions have been devoted to Ernst Ludwig Kirchner, Friedrich Karl Waechter, Paul Cézanne, Édouard Manet, and Frank Lloyd Wright and The Living City (2000).

In 2008, the Museumsgesellschaft zur Pflege der bildenden Kunst (Museum Society for the Protection of Visual Art), a sponsorship society for the MKK, donated an altar painting of the Holy Kinship by Jan Baegert (active c. 1505–1530) to the museum, to mark the society's hundredth year. This work is part of an altarpiece that had been divided into four parts.

An exhibition from May 13 to October 14, 2018, examined the provenances of pictures acquired during the war years under the museum's director Rolf Fritz. (Herr Fritz, woher stammen die Bilder? Ausstellung zur Provenienzforschung im MKK Dortmund – Dortmund) .
