= Italia und Germania =

Painting by Friedrich Overbeck

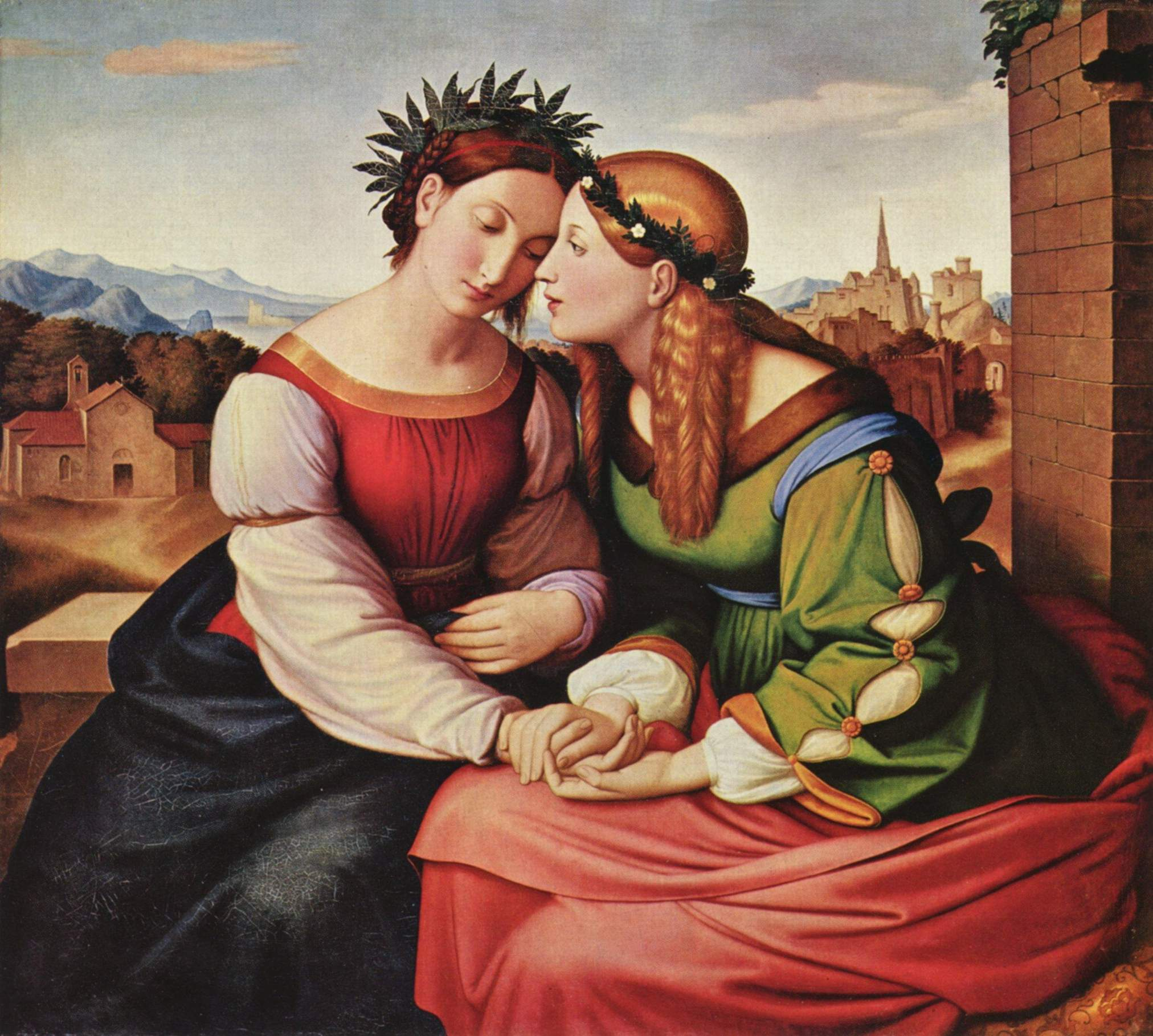
Italia und Germania was painted from 1811 to 1828; oil on canvas. It can be seen as an homage to Overbeck's friend, the painter Franz Pforr.

Italia und Germania (English: Italy and Germany) is an allegorical painting of the painter Friedrich Overbeck, finished in 1828. The painting shows two women inclining to each other, symbolizing the friendship between the two countries or cultures they represent: Italia and Germania. At that time, both Italy and Germany were cultural regions but not unified national states.

Overbeck painted it in the style of the Nazarenes. The original is displayed in the Neue Pinakothek in Munich, Germany.

The two women on the painting sit on a bench in front of a landscape. The left woman (Italia) has dark hair and wears a laurel wreath. The background shows a typically Italian landscape with rocky coast. On the right side the background contains a German city in gothic style, Germania is blond with a wreath of flowers. Both women sit close to each other, in amical inclination, holding hands.

== Historical-political context ==
At the time of the painting's creation, both "Italy" and "Germany" were merely cultural and geographic umbrella terms for politically fragmented regions in central and southern Europe divided into various principalities (cf. Deutscher Bund and Risorgimento), each of which was about half a century later became political entities in the nation-states of the Kingdom of Italy (1861) and the German Empire (1871) during the 1860s and 1870s.

== Literature ==
- Wieland Schmied in Zusammenarbeit mit Tilmann Buddensieg, Andreas Franzke und Walter Grasskamp (Hrsg.): Harenberg Museum der Malerei. 525 Meisterwerke aus sieben Jahrhunderten. Dortmund: Harenberg Lexikon Verlag, 1999. ISBN 3-611-00814-1
- Ausstellungskatalog „Italia und Germania“ der Staatlichen Graphischen Sammlung München, Neue Pinakothek M., 20. Februar – 14. April 2002: „Johann Friedrich Overbeck – Italia und Germania“. München, 2002. ISSN 0941-7036 (PATRIMONIA 224)
