= Johann Friedrich Overbeck =

German painter (1789–1869)

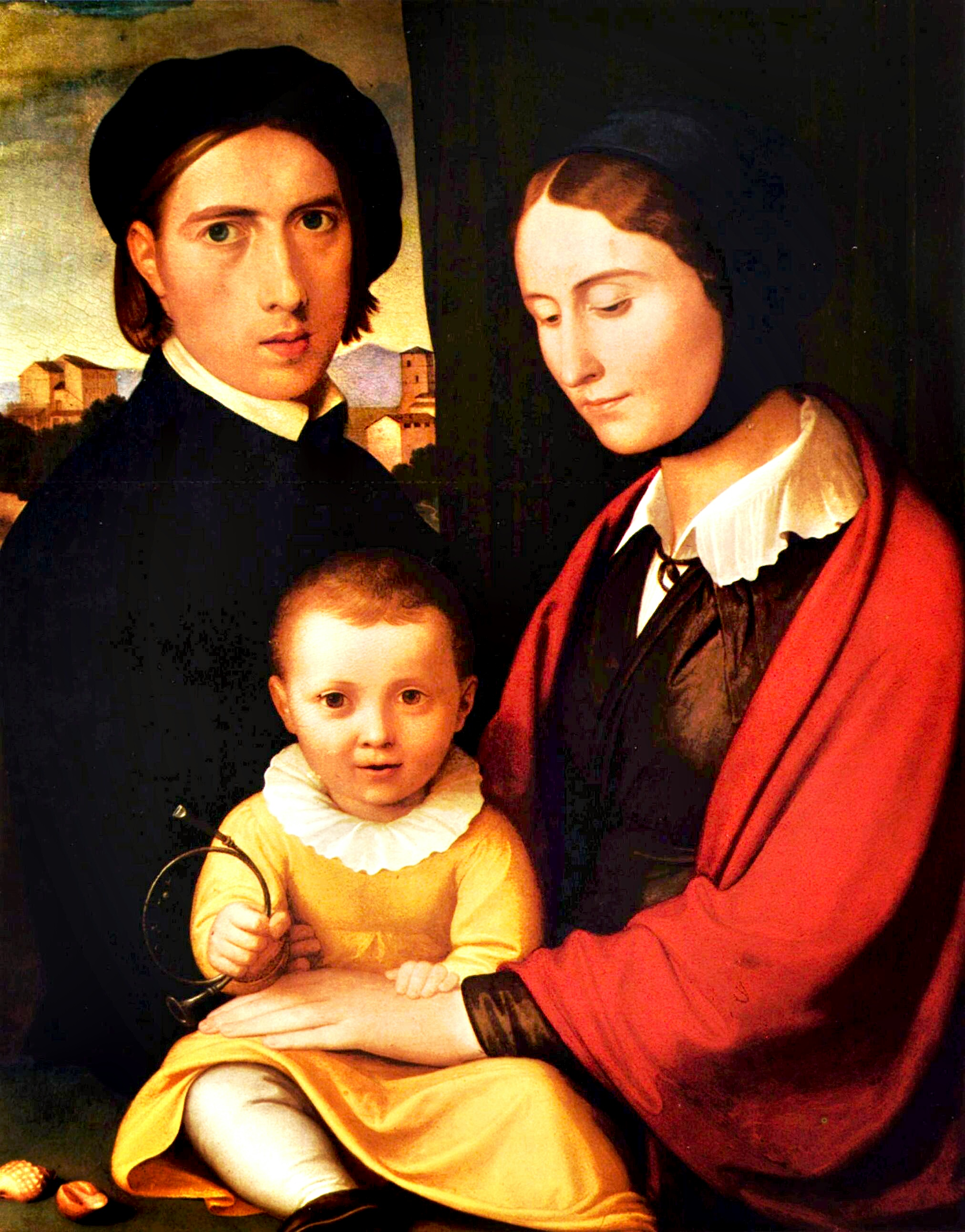
- Self-portrait with family, c. 1820, Behnhaus
- Born: 3 July 1789; Lübeck, Holy Roman Empire (now Germany)
- Died: 12 November 1869 (aged 80); Rome, Papal States (now Italy)
- Resting place: San Bernardo alle Terme, Rome
- Education: Heinrich Füger in Vienna
- Known for: Painting
- Movement: Neoclassicism, Romanticism

Johann Friedrich Overbeck (3 July 1789 – 12 November 1869) was a German painter and a founder of the Nazarene art movement.

== Early life and education ==
Overbeck was born in Lübeck in 1789. His family had been Protestant pastors for three generations; his father Christian Adolph Overbeck (1755–1821) was doctor of law, poet, mystic pietist and burgomaster of Lübeck. Near the family mansion in the Konigstrasse stood the Gymnasium, where his uncle, a doctor of theology and a voluminous writer, was the master; there Johann became a classic scholar and received instruction in art.

== Artistry ==
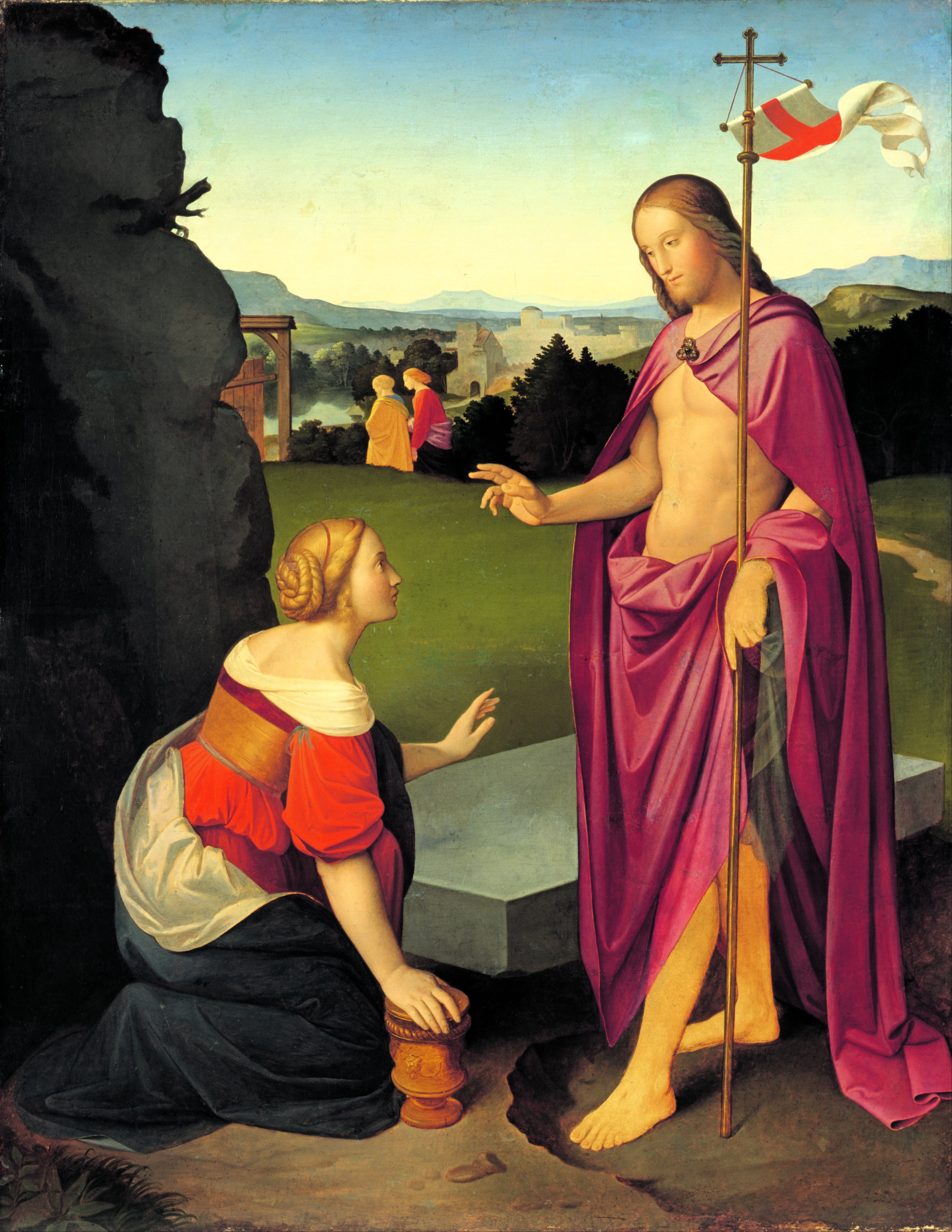
Easter Morning

=== Art studies ===
Overbeck left Lübeck in March 1806, and studied at the academy of Vienna, then under the direction of Heinrich Friedrich Füger. While he gained some of the polished technical aspects of the neoclassic painters, he was alienated by lack of religious spirituality in the themes chosen by his masters. He wrote to a friend that he had fallen among a vulgar set, that every noble thought was suppressed within the academy and that losing all faith in humanity, he had turned inward to his faith for inspiration.

In Overbeck's view, the nature of earlier European art had been corrupted throughout contemporary Europe, starting centuries before the French Revolution, and the process of discarding its Christian orientation was proceeding further now. He sought to express Christian art before the corrupting influence of the late Renaissance, casting aside his contemporary influences, and taking as a guide early Italian Renaissance painters, up to and including Raphael. The training methods at the academy of Vienna were at an international level; however Overbeck wrote to his father around 1808, was it lacked "heart, soul, sensation!" Instead of technical skills and slavish studies ("sklavisches Studium") exercising and working "with a pure heart" ("in einem reinen Herzen") would aim to a renewal of art. Together with other disaffected young artists at the academy, he started a group named the Lukasbund, dedicated to exploring his alternative vision for art. After four years, the differences between his group and others in the academy had grown so irreconcilable, that Overbeck and his followers were expelled.

=== Career ===
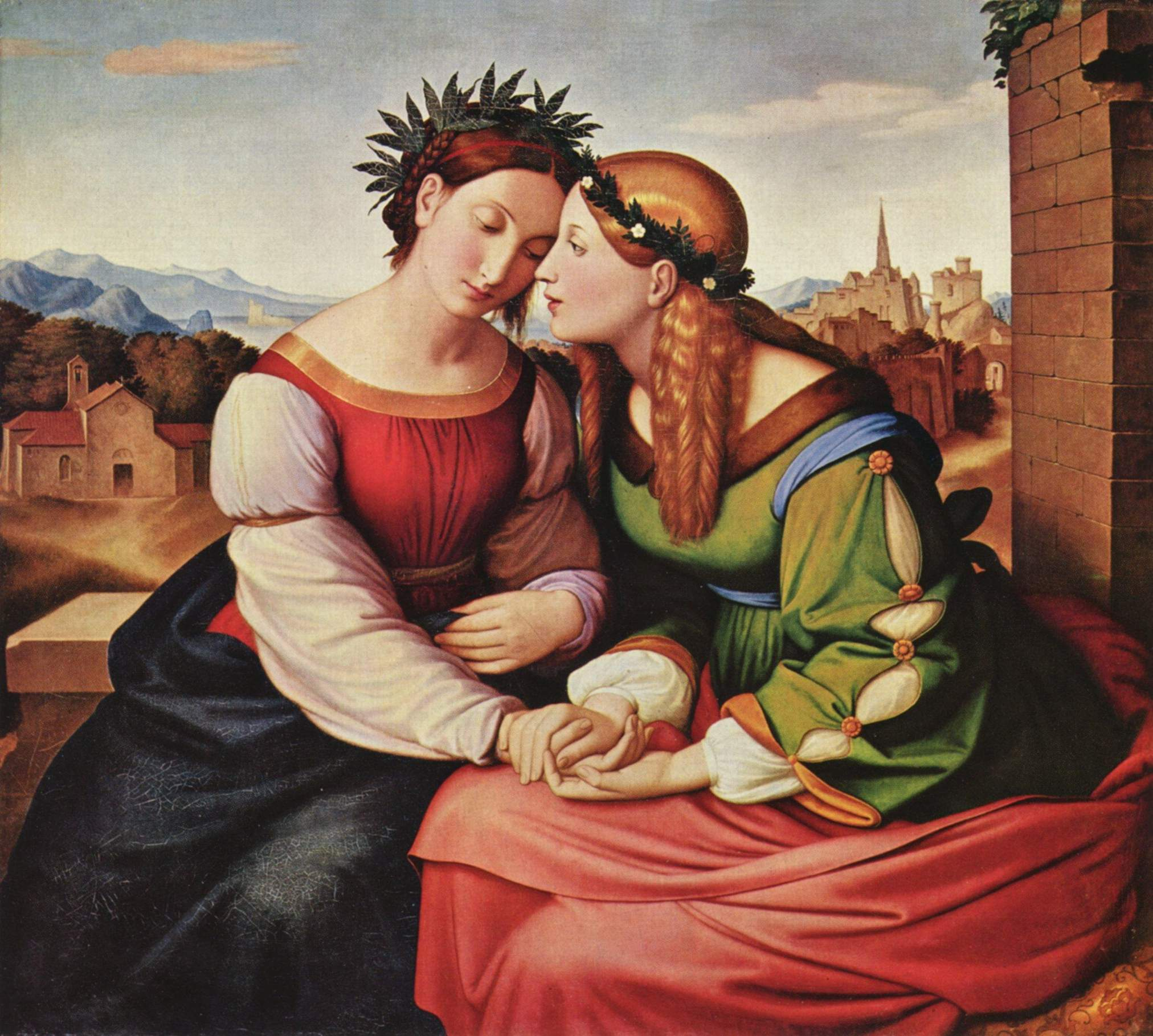
Italia und Germania (Albertinum)

He left for Rome, where he arrived in 1810, carrying his half-finished canvas of Christ's Entry into Jerusalem. Rome became the centre of his labor for 59 years. He was joined by a company of like-minded artists, including Peter von Cornelius, Friedrich Wilhelm Schadow and Philipp Veit, who jointly housed in the old Franciscan convent of Sant'Isidoro, and became known among friends and enemies by the descriptive epithet of Nazarenes. Their precept was hard and honest work and holy living; they eschewed the antique as pagan, the Renaissance as false, and built up a severe revival on simple nature and on the serious art of Perugino, Pinturicchio, Francesco Francia and the young Raphael. The characteristics of the style thus educed were nobility of idea, precision and even hardness of outline, scholastic composition, with the addition of light, shade and colour, not for allurement, but chiefly for perspicuity and completion of motive. Overbeck in 1813 joined the Roman Catholic Church, and thereby he believed that his art received Christian baptism. It has been suggested that the Nazarenes should be considered a special branch of German Romanticism.

Commissions followed regularly. The Prussian consul, Jakob Salomon Bartholdy, had a house on the brow of the Pincian Hill, called Palazzo Zuccari or Casa Bartholdy, and he engaged the quartet of Overbeck, Cornelius, Veit and Schadow to fresco a room 7 metres square (now in the Alte Nationalgalerie, Berlin) with episodes from the story of Joseph and his Brethren. The subjects which fell to the lot of Overbeck were the Seven Years of Famine and Joseph sold by his Brethren, finished in 1818. In the same year, Prince Massimo commissioned Overbeck, Cornelius, Veit and Schnorr to cover the walls and ceilings of his garden pavilion, near St. John Lateran, with frescoes illustrative of Tasso, Dante and Ariosto. To Overbeck was assigned, in a room 5 metres square, the illustration of Tasso's Jerusalem Delivered; and of eleven compositions occupying one entire wall, is the Meeting of Godfrey de Bouillon and Peter the Hermit. After ten years delay, the overtaxed and enfeebled painter delegated the completion of the frescoes to his friend Joseph von Führich. The leisure thus gained was devoted to a thoroughly congenial theme, the Vision of St Francis, a wall painting 6.5 metres long, finished in 1830, for the Porziuncola in the Basilica of Santa Maria degli Angeli near Assisi.

== Death ==
He died in Rome in 1869. He was interred in the Chapel of St Francis in the Church of San Bernardo alle Terme, where he had worshipped.

== Honours ==
Overbeck was elected a Foreign Honorary Member of the American Academy of Arts and Sciences in 1864.

== Family ==
His nephew Johannes Overbeck, a professor of archaeology at the University of Leipzig, was noted for his work in art history.

== Followers ==
In 1843 the Church of St. John the Baptist, Penymynydd, North Wales was built by the Glynne Family of Hawarden, Flintshire. The first vicar, Rev. John Ellis Troughton spent the first 20 years of the life of the church painting the interior with Overbeck murals, including the Palm Sunday one - of which the original was destroyed in an Allied Bombing raid in 1942, overnight into Palm Sunday.

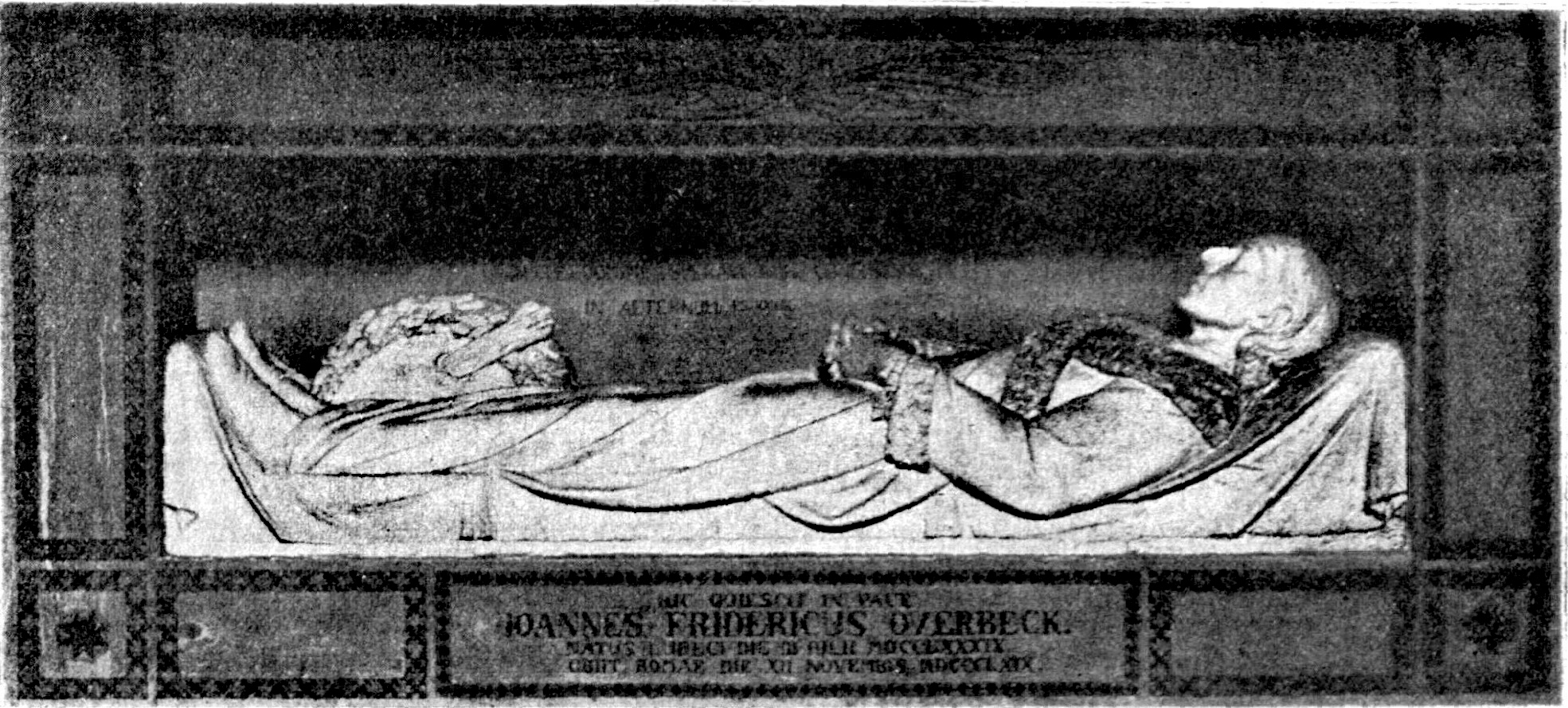
Epitaph of Friedrich Overbeck (1871)

== Works ==
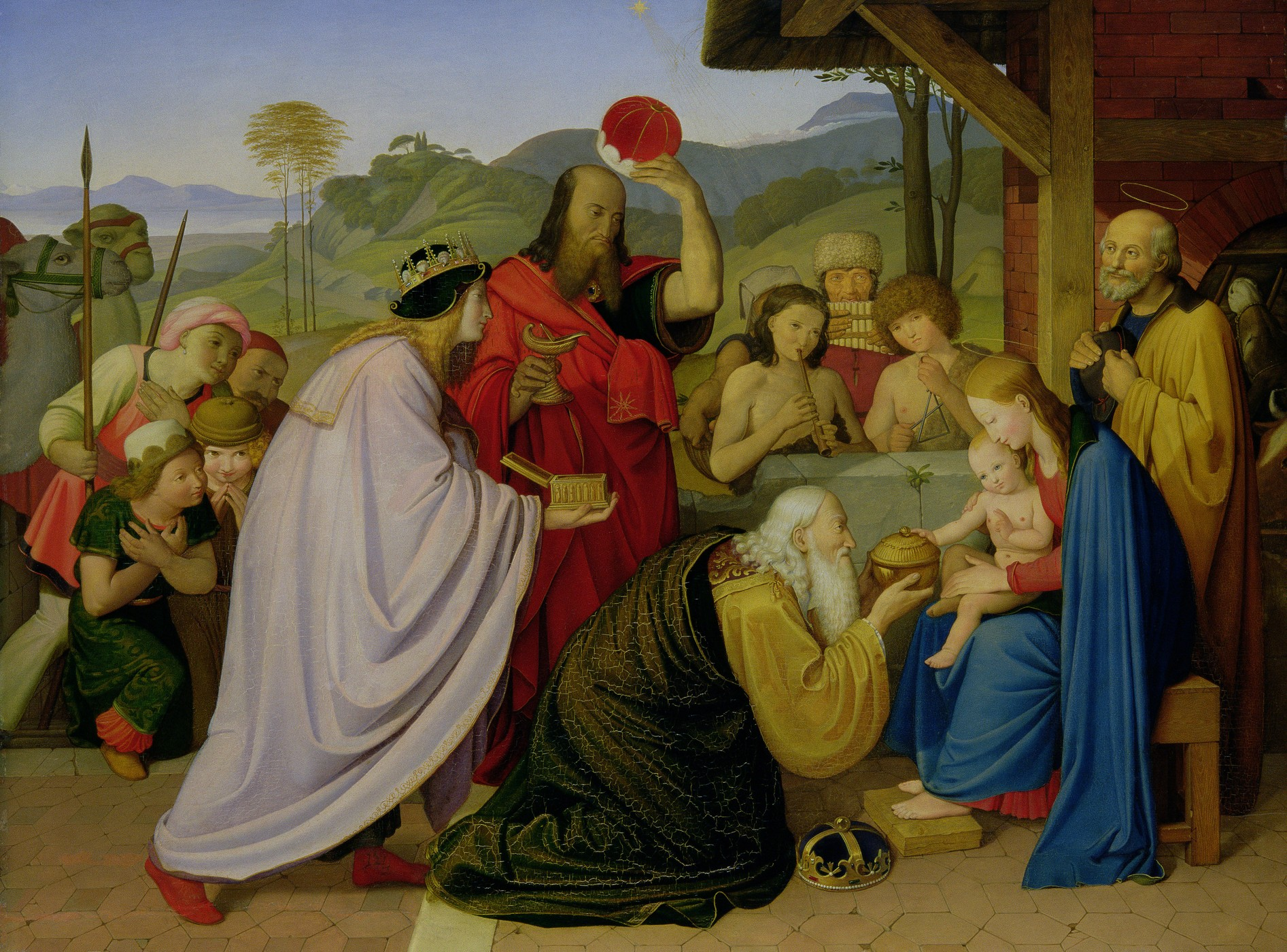
The Adoration of the kings

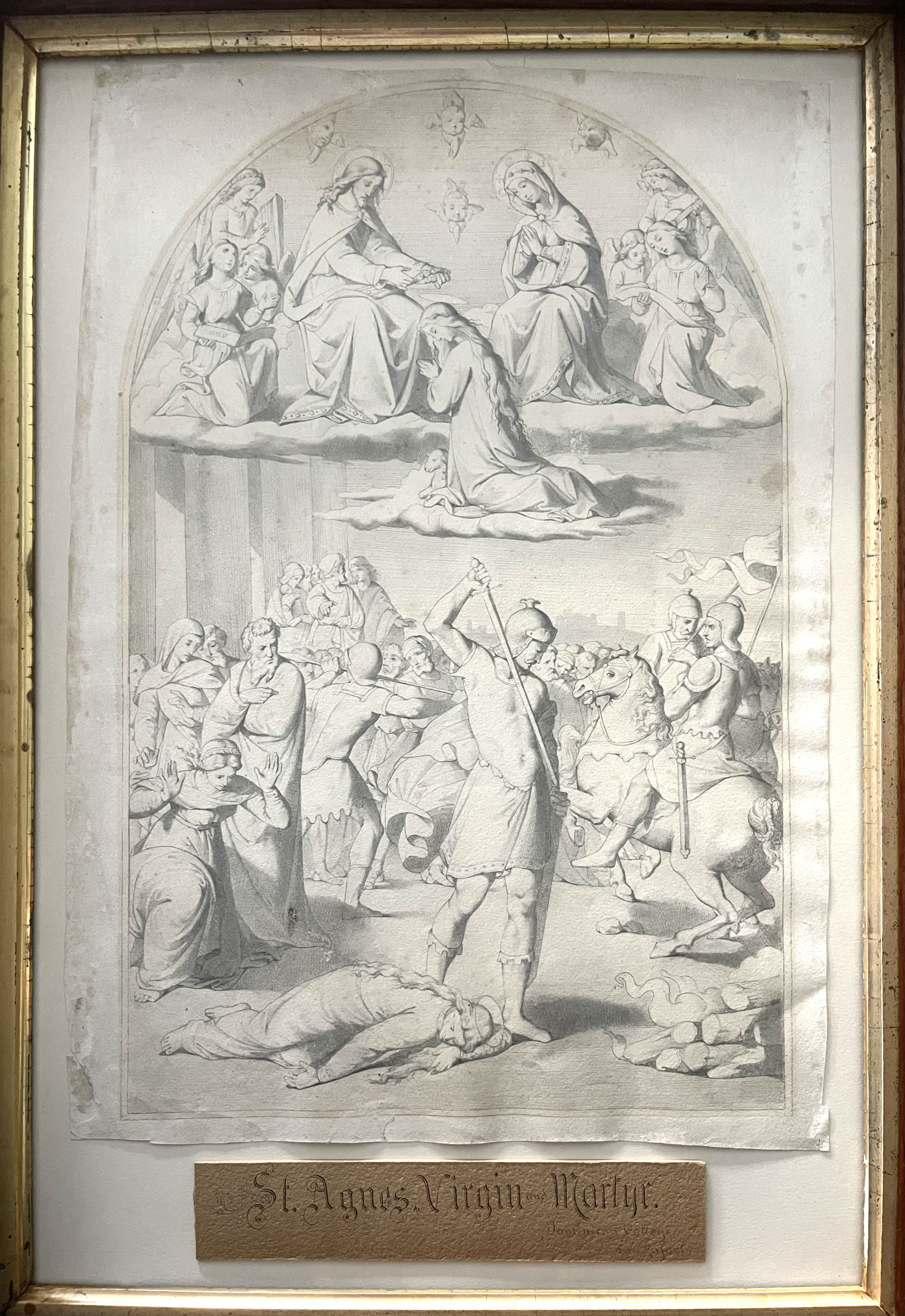
St. Agnes goes to heaven, lamb of innocence

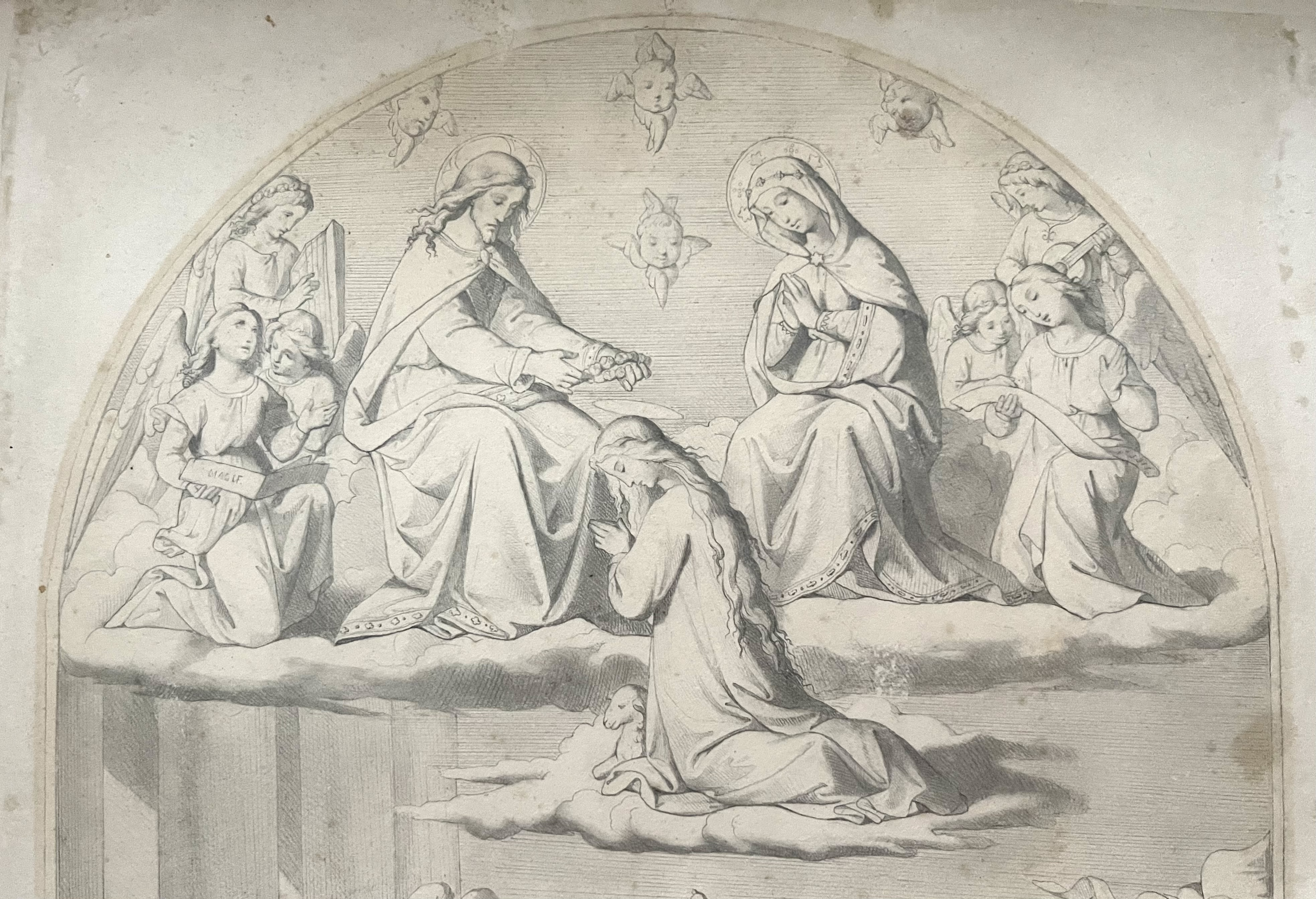
Johann Overbeck graphite pencil drawing

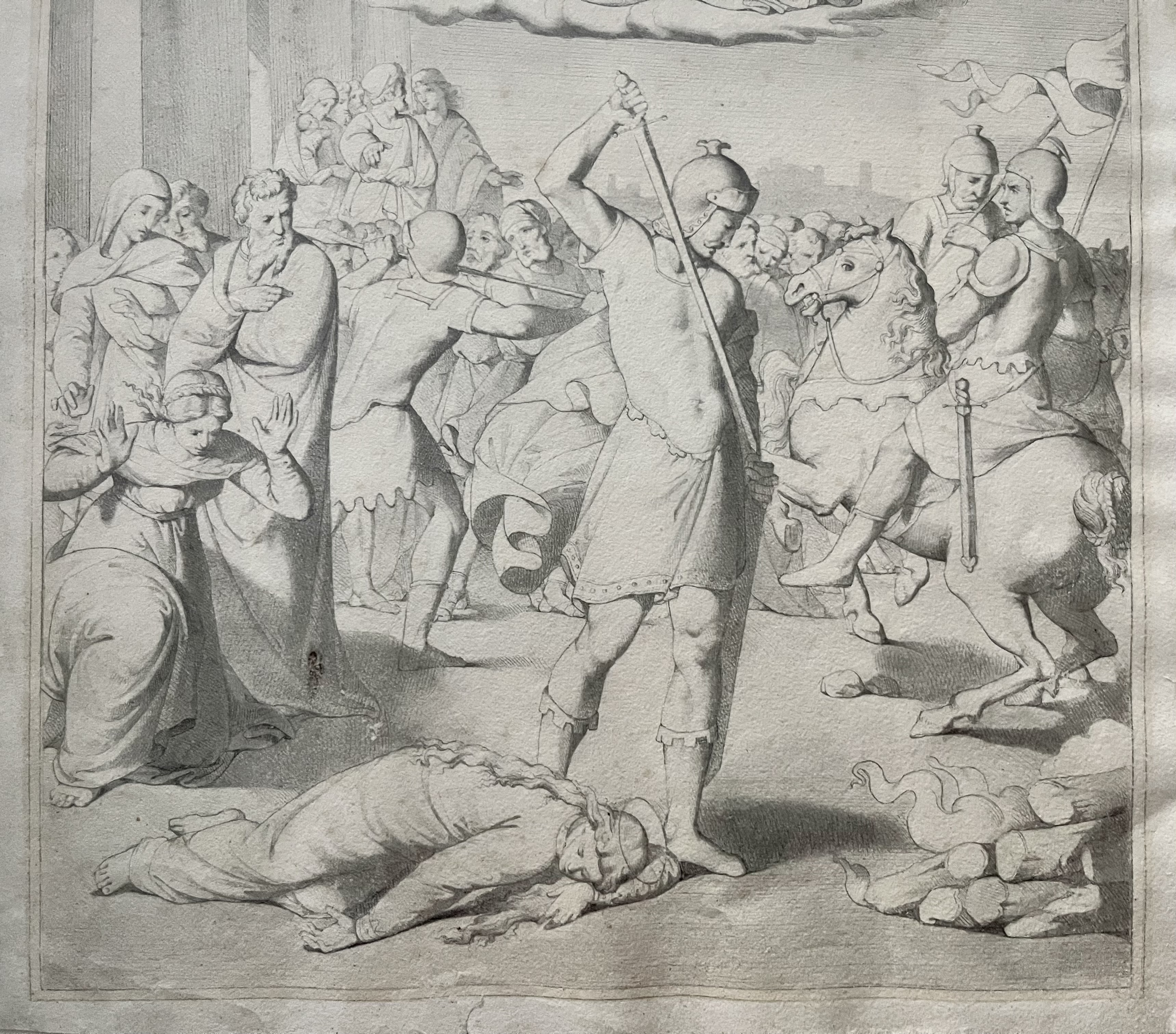
Early Christians were punished, young Agnes family stood for Christ. She was killed and became a martyr.

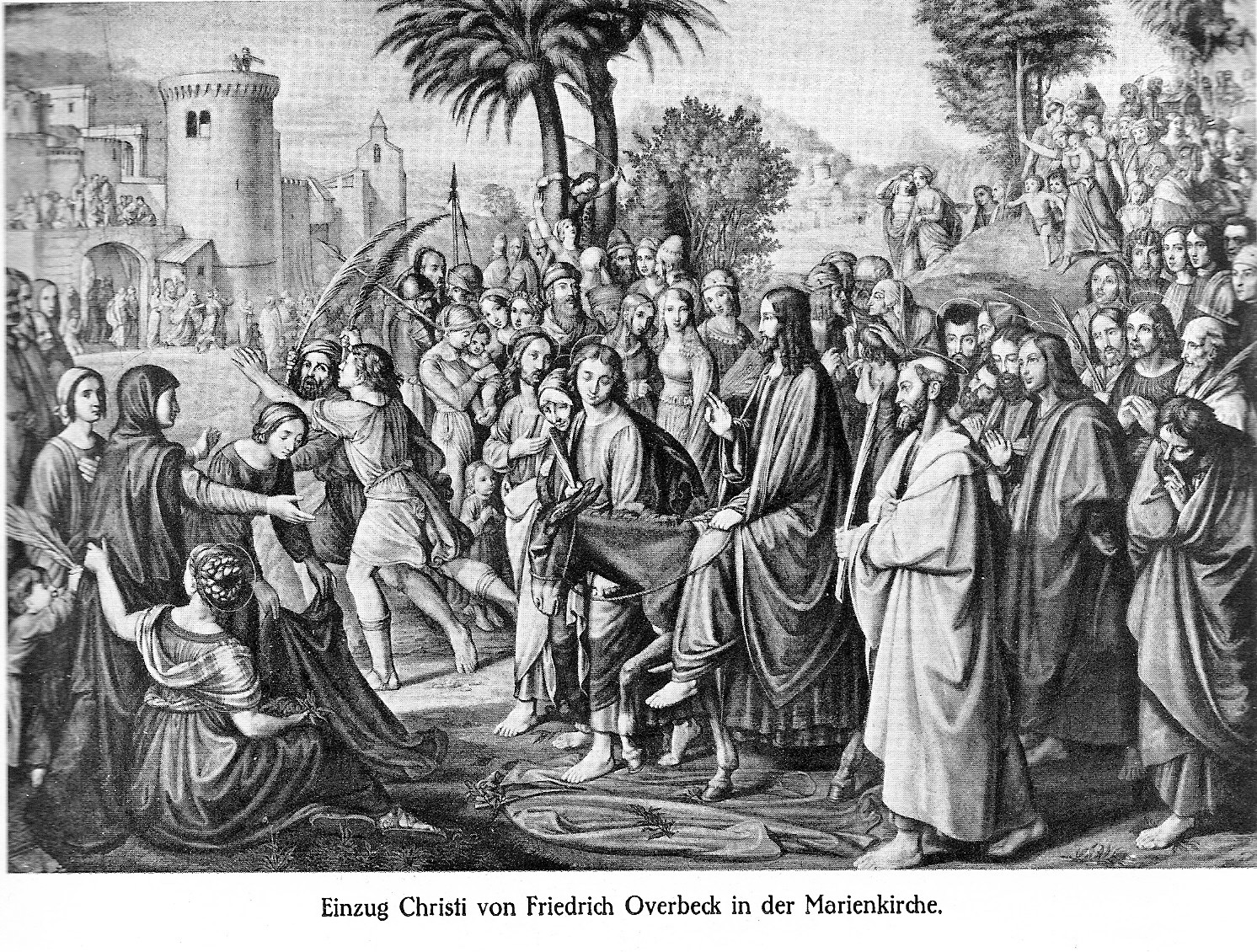
Christ's Entry into Jerusalem

- Portrait of the Painter Franz Pforra (1810)
- Vittoria Caldoni (1821)
- Christ's Entry into Jerusalem (1824), in the Marienkirche (destroyed through Allied bombing, Palm Sunday 1942).
- Christus am Ölberg (1827–1833)
- Italy and Germany (1828)
- Christ's Agony in the Garden (1835), in the great hospital, Hamburg.
- Lo Sposalizio (1836), Muzeum Narodowe, Poznań, Poland.
- The Triumph of Religion in the Arts (1840), in the Städel Institute, Frankfurt.
- The Banishment of Hagar (1841)
- Pietà (1846), in the Marienkirche, Lübeck.
- Lamentation of Christ (1846)
- The Incredulity of St. Thomas (1851), first in the possession of Beresford Hope, London, now in the Schäfer collection, Schweinfurt, Germany.
- The Assumption of the Madonna (1855), in Cologne Cathedral.
- The Ascension of the Virgin Mary (1857)
- Christ Delivered from the Jews (1858), tempera, originally on a ceiling in the Quirinal Palace. It is a commission from Pius IX, and a direct attack on the Italian temporal government, therefore later covered by a canvas adorned with Cupids, and now hanging in front of the Aula delle Benedizione in the Vatican.
- The Seven Sacraments (sketches are kept in the cathedral of Orvieto) (1861)
- Baptism 1862-64, Neue Pinakothek, Munich
- Drawings for the frescoes for the Cathedral of St. Peter and St. Paul in Đakovo (1867–1869).

== Sources ==
- Lionel Gossman. "Making of a Romantic Icon: The Religious Context of Friedrich Overbeck’s ‘Italia und Germania.’" American Philosophical Society, 2007. ISBN 0-87169-975-3. at dianepub.wordpress.com
- Gilman, D. C.; Peck, H. T.; Colby, F. M., eds. (1905). "Overbeck, Johann Friedrich" . New International Encyclopedia (1st ed.). New York: Dodd, Mead.
