= Jens Christian Jensen =

German art historian and curator (1928–2013)

Jens Christian Jensen (11 May 1928 – 6 April 2013) was a German art historian and curator.

== Life ==
Born in Lübeck, after the Abitur passed at the Katharineum, Jensen studied art history, classical archaeology, Germanistics and history of Christianity in Heidelberg and Mainz from 1949. He received his doctorate in 1954 with Walter Paatz on Master Bertram as a picture carver. He then worked as a volunteer at the Museum für Kunst- und Kulturgeschichte in Lübeck. From 1958, he was first a research assistant, later curator at the Kurpfälzisches Museum in Heidelberg and from 1968 to 1970 director of the Heidelberger Kunstverein.

In 1971, he was appointed the first independent director of the Kunsthalle Kiel and executive chairman of the Schleswig-Holsteinischer Kunstverein. Jensen retired in 1990.

From 1972 to 2005, Jensen was a member of the scientific advisory board of the Museum Georg Schäfer in Schweinfurt. In 1979, he was awarded the Honorary Professorship of the State of Schleswig-Holstein "in recognition of his services to the activation of art life in Schleswig-Holstein and in appreciation of his scholarly achievements in the service of art". Jensen was the author of numerous writings on medieval sculpture, on 19th and 20th century painting and drawing, and on contemporary art. In 2008, he was curator of the exhibition Carl Spitzweg and Wilhelm Busch. Two Artists' Anniversaries in the Wilhelm Busch Museum in Hanover.

Jensen was decorated as a knight of the Danish Order of the Dannebrog. He was a member of the Royal Norwegian Society of Sciences and Letters in Trondheim. He received an honorary doctorate. In 1991, he was honoured with the Kultur- und Wissenschaftspreis der Stadt Kiel.

Jensen died in Hamburg at the age of 84.

== Publications (selection) ==
- Meister Bertram als Bildschnitzer. Das Verhältnis des Doberaner Lettneraltares zu den Skulpturen des Hamburger Petrialtares. Dissertation Heidelberg 1954 (Maschinenschriftlich vervielfältigt 1956).
- Jens Christian Jensen (ed.) 100 Jahre Kieler Woche – Lyonel Feininger: Gemälde, Aquarelle und Zeichnungen, Druckgraphik. Verlag: Kunsthalle zu Kiel der Christian-Albrechts-Universität, Kiel 1982
- Amerikanische Kunst von 1945 bis heute. Published together with Dieter Honisch. DuMont, Cologe 1976
- Philipp Otto Runge. DuMont, Cologne 1977, ISBN 3-7701-0907-4
- Christian Rohlfs. Gemälde − Aquarelle. Ausstellungskatalog. Kunsthalle, Kiel 1979
- Paul Wunderlich. Eine Werkmonographie with contribution by Max Bense and Philippe Roberts-Jones. Volker Huber, Offenbach 1980
- Günter Grass. Hundert Zeichnungen 1955–1987. Ausstellungskatalog der Kunsthalle Kiel. Herausgegeben von Jens Christian Jensen, Kiel 1987, ISBN 3-923701-23-3
- Harald Duwe. Werkverzeichnis der Gemälde und Ölstudien. Prestel, Munich 1987, ISBN 3-7913-0818-1
- Carl Spitzweg. Zwischen Resignation und Zeitkritik. DuMont, Cologne 1991, ISBN 3-7701-0815-9
- Caspar David Friedrich. Leben und Werk. (dumont Taschenbücher, vol. 14), 1st edition, DuMont Schauberg, Cologne 1974, ISBN 3-7701-0758-6 (Nachauflage 1995).
  - New edition, revised and with an Afterword, DuMont, Cologne 1999, ISBN 3-7701-4800-2.
