= Gustav Bosse =

German publisher

Gustav Bosse (6 February 1884 – 27 March 1943) was a German music publisher.

== Life ==
Born in Vienenburg/Harz as son of the sugar factory director and music publisher Fritz Bosse, he founded the Gustav Bosse Verlag for music books in Regensburg in 1912. Already the programme of the publication series Deutsche Musikbücherei showed a strictly anti-modernist, German-national orientation. Since 1919 he had a friendship with the book illustrator Hans Wildermann who illustrated many of his printed products. He published the Neue Zeitschrift für Musik in 1929 until his death in 1943. In 1939 he was appointed honorary senator of the University of Cologne because of his merits for the Anton Bruckner movement.

Since May 1, 1933, Bosse had been a member of the NSDAP (membership number 2.530.992). He was also leader of the artificial circle of the NS-community Kraft durch Freude. On 19 March 1938 Bosse gave the following autobiographical information in response to the questionnaire from the Reichsschrifttumskammer:

After the war I was often active in the national struggles for a new Germany. In 1919 I was co-founder of the Citizens' Bloc and later co-founder and district leader of the Resident Army. I was also a founding member of the local branch of the German Officers' Association. In 1920/21, together with Prof. Dr. Wiedenbauer, I founded the local group of the Deutschnationale Volkspartei, of which I was a member of the board until 1933. The foundation of the NSDAP here in 1922 by Mr. Reiter was supported by me in word and deed. At the same time I became chairman of the Vereinigte Vaterländische Verbände Deutschlands in Regensburg. (...) In the decisive battles before 1933 I presented the Gauleiter of that time Franz Maierhofer my printing house for the printing of the Gauamtliche Kampfzeitung Schaffendes Volk. I supported this struggle to the utmost by giving out the largest loans, which severely strained my own means, so that at the end of 1932 - beginning of 1933 I myself came into a very difficult situation by the straining of my bank loans and the loans of my suppliers. In this difficult situation the Fuhrer himself intervened at that time by providing assistance through Rudolf Hess and through an envoy of Hitler's Chancellery, Mr. Stark (RM 28,000).

In the winter of 1938/39 Bosse tried to participate in the aryanization of the music publisher C. F. Peters Leipzig. His request to the Federal Ministry for Economic Affairs and Energy whether he could take over the publishing house failed because he only published music-literary works and thus did not meet the qualifications of a music publisher.

Bosse died in Regensburg at the age of 59.

== Publications ==
- Biblische Geschichten des Alten und Neuen Testaments für den Gebrauch der Lehrer und Schüler beim Unterrichte in den unteren und mittleren Klassen der Bürger- und Landschulen.
- Führer durch die Hausmusik : die empfehlenswertesten Unterrichtswerke und Kompositionen für Klavier, Harmonium, Violine, Violoncello, sowie für ein- und mehrstimmigen Gesang.
- Almanach der deutschen Musikbuecherei 1922 auf das Jahr 1922.
- Beethoven-Almanach der Deutschen Musikbücherei auf das Jahr 1927.
- Führerverantwortlichkeit oder "Revolution der Straße?" in Zeitschrift für Musik C/5, May 1933. pp. 483–485.

== Literature ==
- Fred K. Prieberg: Handbuch Deutsche Musiker 1933–1945, CD-ROM-Lexikon, Kiel 2004, pp. 662–665.
