= Marienkirche, Dortmund =

Coordinates: 51.5142°N 7.4675°E

Marienkirche
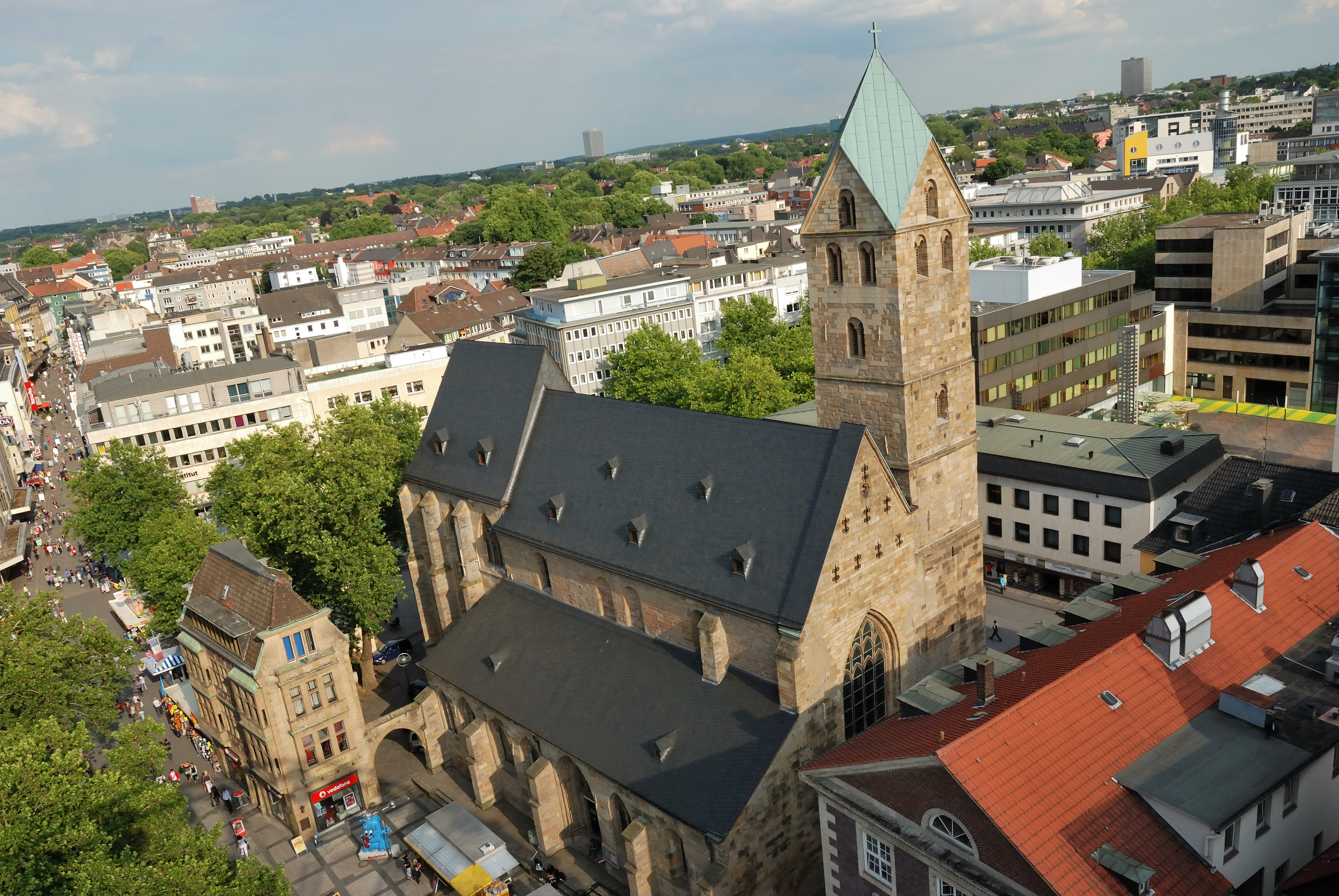
- Marienkirche
- Location: Dortmund, North Rhine-Westphalia
- Country: Germany
- Denomination: Lutheran
- Previous denomination: Roman Catholic
- Website: www.st-marien-dortmund.de

Architecture
- Architectural type: hall church
- Style: Gothic

Administration
- Parish: St. Mary's Congregation, Dortmund

Marienkirche (St. Mary's Church) is a church in Dortmund, North Rhine-Westphalia state, Germany, located in the inner city. Since the Reformation, it has been a Lutheran parish church of St. Marien. The church was destroyed in World War II, but rebuilt. It also serves as a concert venue for sacred music.

The church was built on the Hellweg, opposite of the Reinoldikirche, for the town's council and jurisdiction. It shows elements of Romanesque and Gothic architecture, and houses notable Medieval art, such as the Marienaltar by Conrad von Soest and the Berswordtaltar.

== History ==
The church was built on the Hellweg, a main Medieval road connecting the free imperial town Dortmund with others. It was erected between 1170 and 1200 in Romanesque style to serve the town's council and jurisdiction. It is the oldest extant church in Dortmund's inner city. Around 1350, a choir in Gothic architecture was built. It served as a model for the Reinoldikirche, which was built opposite of the road.

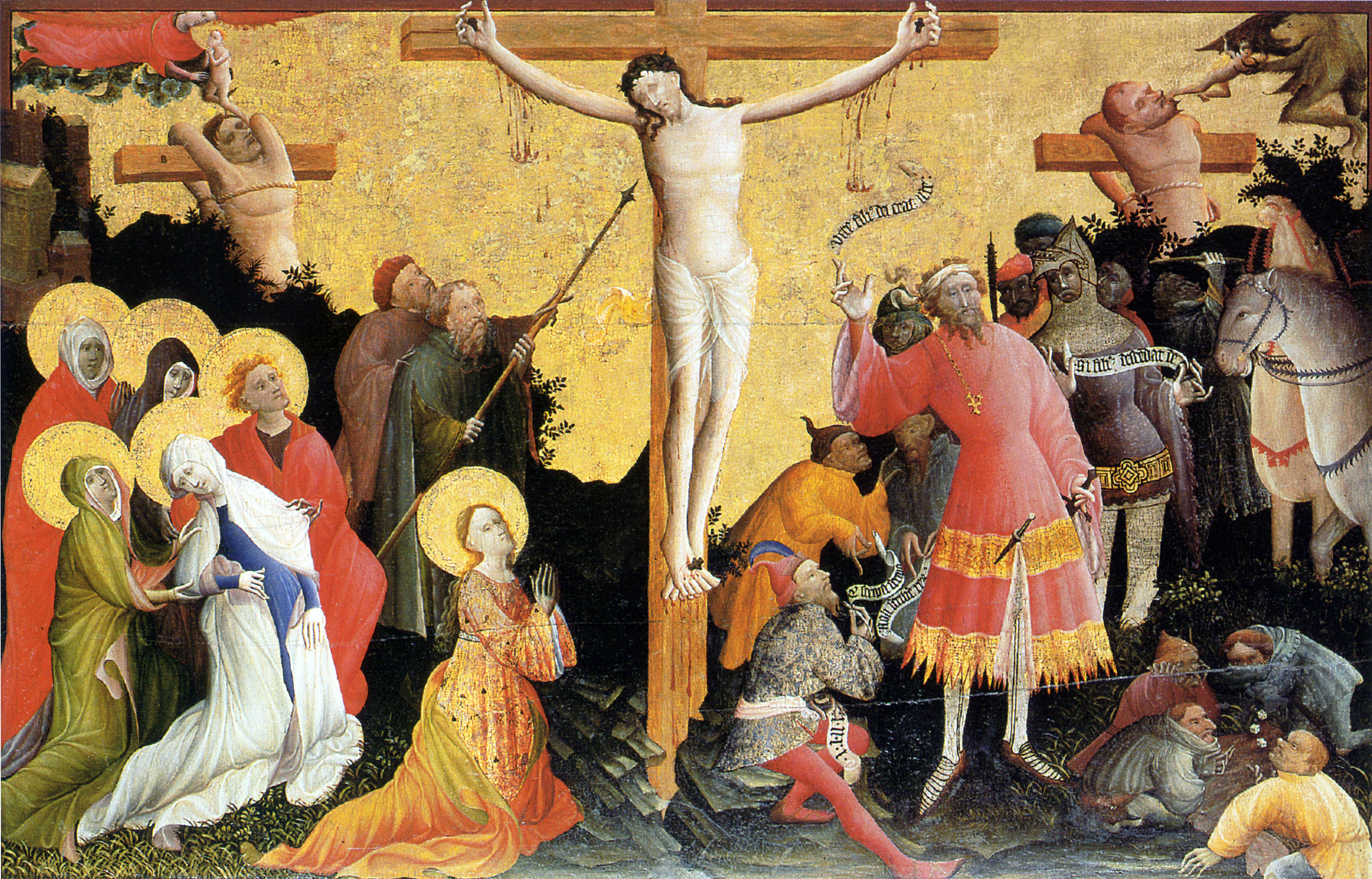
The central panel of the Berswordtaltar, showing the Crucifixion with the Swoon of Mary

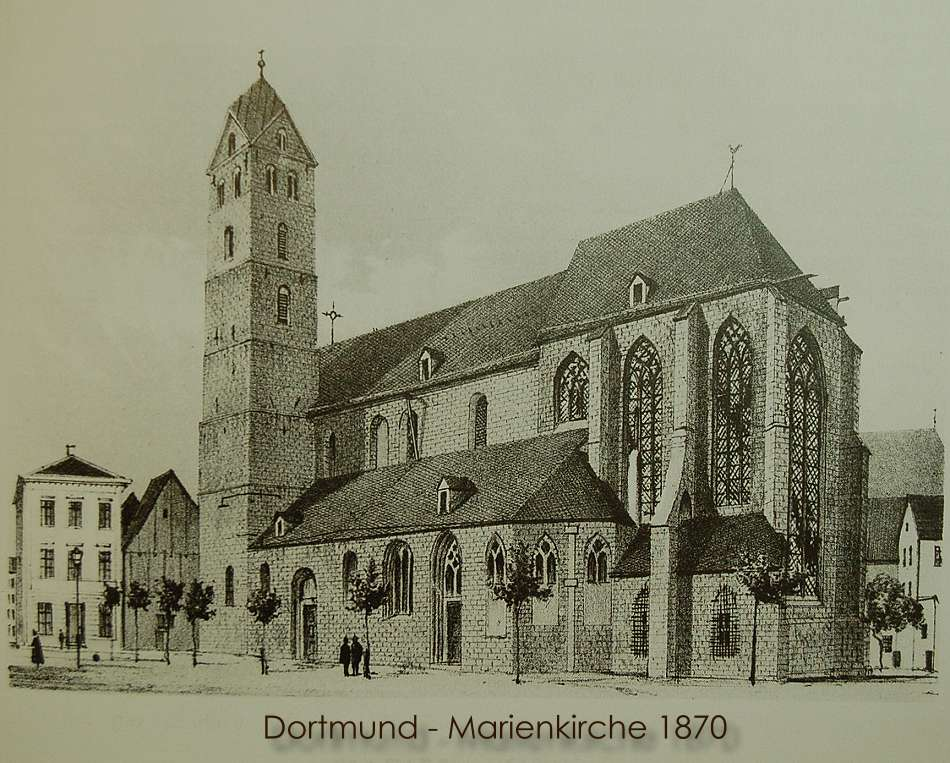
The church on a postcard, ca. 1870

The Marienkirche houses notable Medieval art, such as the Berswordtaltar from 1385, named after its patron, and the Marienaltar by Conrad von Soest from 1420, with scenes of the life of Mary. The central panel of the Berswordt-Altar dating from 1397 depicts the Swoon of the Virgin, an imagery which gradually disappeared from paintings of the Crucifixion after Molanus and other theologians of the Counter-Reformation condemned its use. The Marienaltar now contains only fragments of von Soest's original masterpiece. In 1720 a new reredos was installed, and workmen took hammers and saws to the paintings to make them fit into the new frames, losing over half of the large central panel and a quarter of each of the two side panels.

Since the Reformation, it has been a Lutheran parish church of St. Marien. The church was almost completely destroyed by bombs in World War II. However, both the Marienaltar and the Berswordtaltar had been evacuated to the Cappenberg Castle at the outset of the war and thus survived. The church was rebuilt, beginning right after the war and completed in 1959. The swallow's nest organ high above the nave, was reconstructed in the same position by Steinmann Orgelbau. The glass windows were restored in subdued colours after designs of Johannes Schreiter, completed in 1972. The church serves as a concert venue for sacred music.

== Literature ==
- Klaus Lange: Capella Regis. Zum Bauprogramm der Dortmunder Marienkirche. in: Beiträge zur Geschichte Dortmunds und der Grafschaft Mark. 83/84, 1992/1993
- Konrad Lorenz: Die Ev. St. Marienkirche zu Dortmund. Mariengemeinde, Dortmund 1981
- Albert Ludorff: Die Bau- und Kunstdenkmäler des Kreises Dortmund-Stadt. Münster 1894.
- Gustav Luntowski: Günther Högl, Thomas Schilp, Norbert Reimann, Geschichte der Stadt Dortmund., Stadtarchiv Dortmund, Dortmund (Harenberg) 1994, ISBN 3-611-00397-2
- Götz J. Pfeiffer: Die Malerei am Niederrhein und in Westfalen um 1400. Der Meister des Berswordt-Retabels und der Stilwandel der Zeit, Petersberg, 2009, Dissertation. Berlin, 2005
- Götz J. Pfeiffer: "... noch vorzüglicher wie die zwei weiblichen Heiligen ...". Werke vom Meister des Berswordt-Retabels mit dem Wildunger Retabel im Vergleich. In: Geschichtsblätter für Waldeck, 96, 2008, p. 10–31
- Wolfgang Rinke: Dortmunder Kirchen des Mittelalters, St. Reinoldi, St. Marien, St. Johannes Bapt. Propstei, St. Petri. Dortmund 1991, ISBN 3-7932-5032-6
- Thomas Schilp und Barbara Welzel (Hg.): Die Marienkirche in Dortmund. Bielefeld (Verlag für Regionalgeschichte) 2012, ISBN 978-3-89534-943-0
