= Swallow's nest organ =

Form of pipe organ

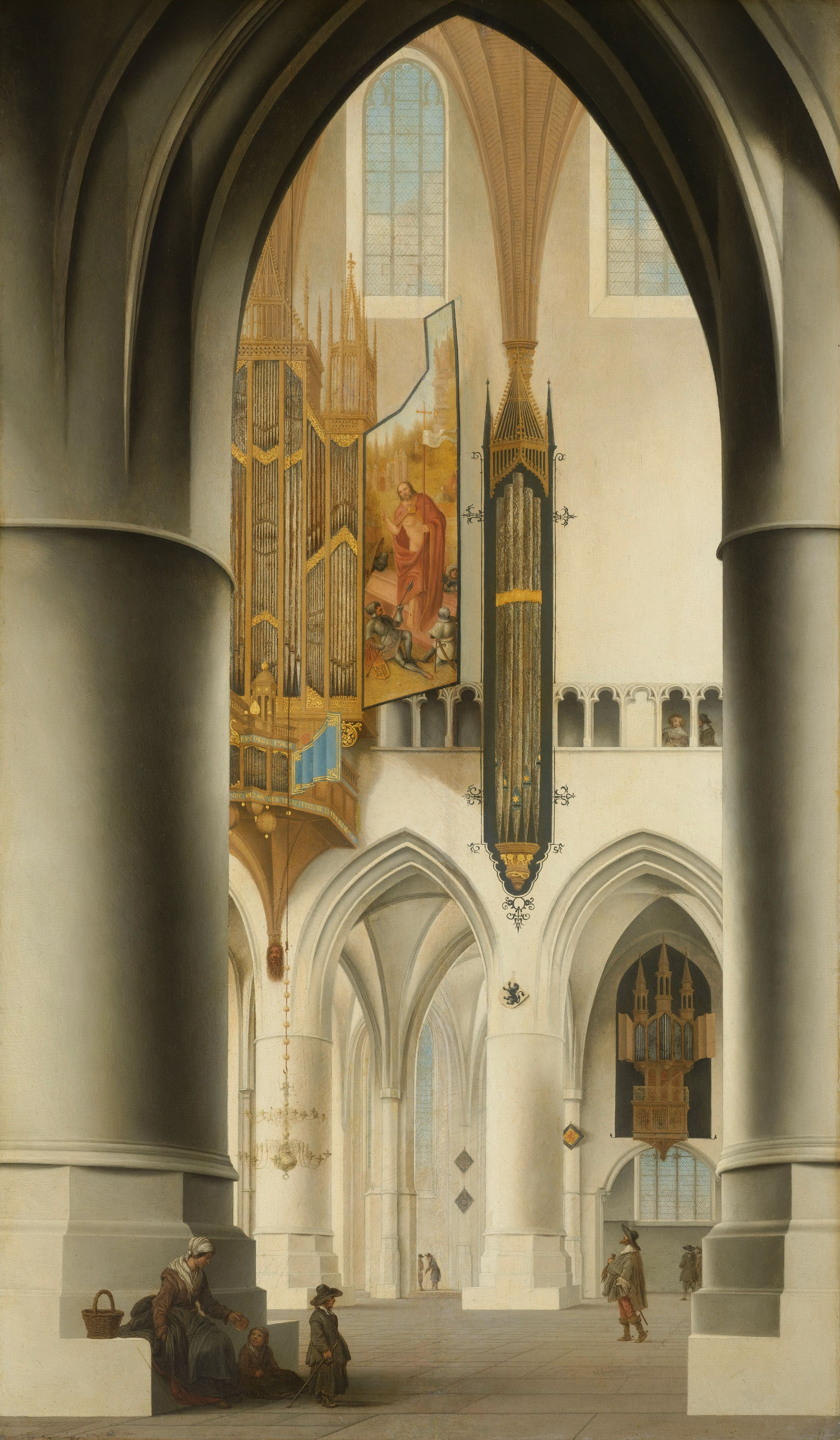
A swallow's nest organ in the Grote Kerk, Haarlem, depicted by Saenredam in 1636.

A swallow's nest organ (French: orgue en nid d'hirondelle, German: Schwalbennestorgel) is a form of pipe organ which takes its name from its resemblance to the nests built by swallows. Rather than placed on a gallery or on the floor, the swallow's nest organ case sits on a platform suspended on a wall, with the wall as its sole support. In some churches it was wedged into the triforium (a shallow arched gallery built into a wall above the nave). In swallow's nest organs from the Renaissance period, the base of the suspended platform, called a tribuna, typically tapered into a point. There is generally only room in a swallow's nest for one person, the organist, who accesses it by a ladder or from a staircase concealed behind the wall.

== History ==
Swallow's nest organs were particularly common in churches during the Middle Ages and Renaissance where they were symbolic of "divine music" stemming from the effect of the instrument floating above the congregation. The effect was accentuated when the organ was being played because the opened chest doors resembled wings. Its name was likewise symbolic. During the Middle Ages birdsong became equated with the song of angels.

The first "great organ" at the Cathédrale Notre-Dame de Paris was a swallow's nest built in the early 1300s and suspended above the nave. The new, larger organ which replaced it in 1401 was placed in a purpose-built stone gallery above the west door of the cathedral. Bach used the swallow's nest organ on the east wall of the Thomaskirche in Leipzig for the first performances of the St Matthew Passion (BWV 244) and the Magnificat in E-flat major (BWV 243a), but it was in such a poor state by 1740 that it could not be repaired and was demolished. The increasing size and complexity of organs led to the relative rarity of the swallow's nest type and by the mid-18th century the gallery organ had become dominant. However, under the influence of the organ reform movement, several new swallow's nest organs were built in the 20th century, and older ones were restored or reconstructed. One of the best-known North American examples is in the Duke University Chapel in Durham, North Carolina. It was built by John Brombaugh and installed in 1997.

According to musicologist Richard Kassel, the French organ builder Aristide Cavaillé-Coll proposed a giant swallow's nest organ for St Peter's Basilica in Rome in 1869 and spent the rest of his life trying unsuccessfully to have his plan approved by the Vatican. The oldest swallow's nest organ which still plays, was built in 1435 and is housed in the Notre-Dame de Valère basilica in Sion, Switzerland.

== In art ==
Swallow's nest organs depicted in paintings include the Sacra Conversazione (c. 1446) attributed to the workshop of Konrad Witz; Saenredam's 1636 painting of the interior of the Grote Kerk, Haarlem (above); and several paintings of idealized church interiors by Emanuel de Witte from the late 1600s. The church interior depicted in the Sacra Conversazione has been identified as the Basel Cathedral. Saenredam's painting of the Grote Kerk interior shows the swallow's nest organ with open chest doors decorated with paintings of the Resurrection. It also has a rare depiction of a separate set of Bourdon pipes suspended on the wall next to the organ. Like many of de Witte's church paintings, his Interior of a Protestant Gothic Church (c. 1685) combines architectural elements taken from both the Nieuwe Kerk and Oude Kerk churches in Amsterdam. In this painting a swallow's nest organ with its chest doors open is depicted behind two large columns with the congregation gathered below.

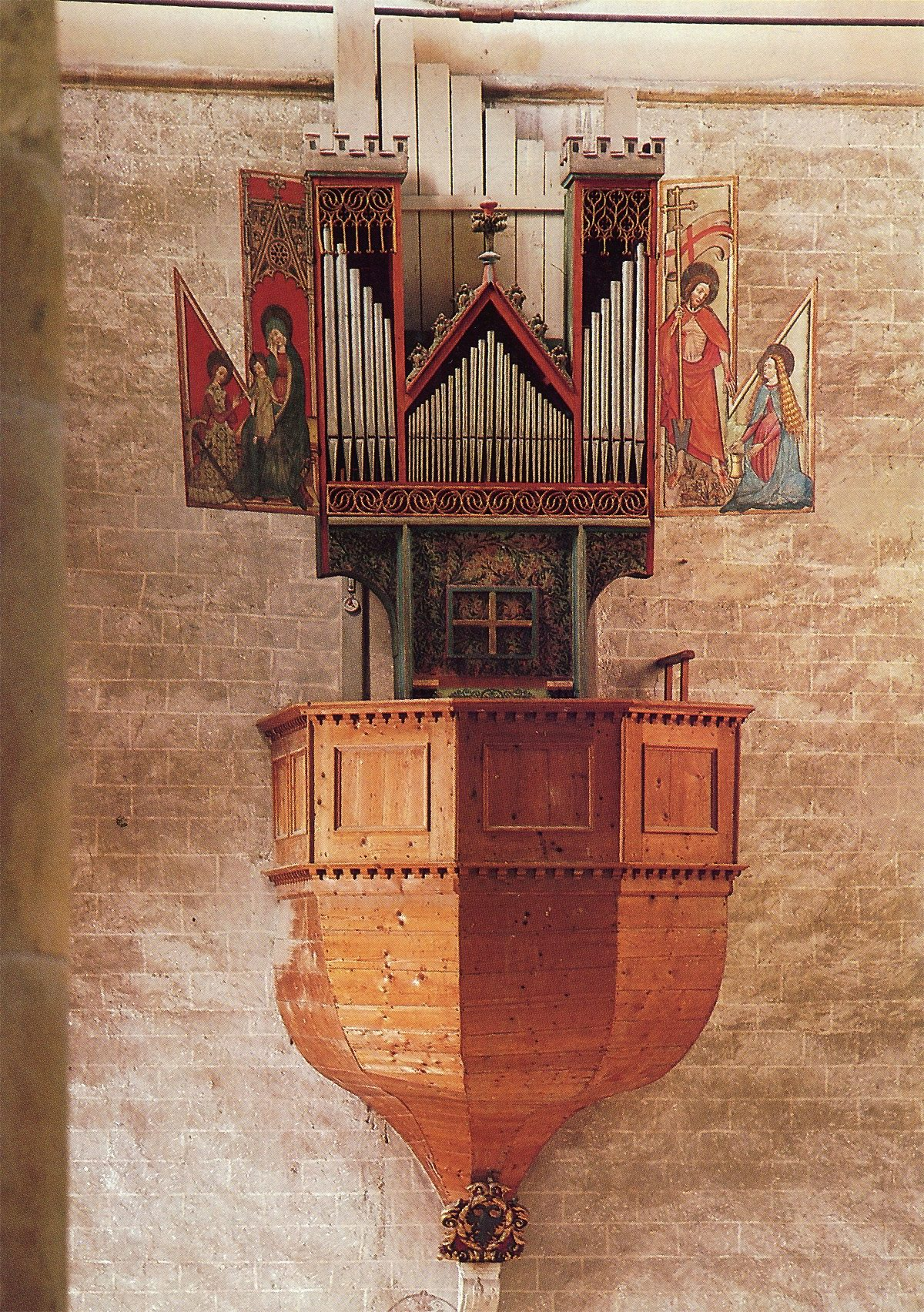
The oldest playable swallow's nest organ, built in 1435 and situated in the Notre-Dame de Valère basilca

== Churches with existing swallow's nest organs ==
- Aachen Cathedral, Germany
- Bamberg Cathedral, Germany
- Bremen Cathedral, Germany
- Chartres Cathedral, France
- Cathedral of St. Michael and St. Gudula, Belgium
- Duke University Chapel, US
- Frankfurt Cathedral, Germany
- Marienkirche, Dortmund, Germany
- Monastery of Santa Cruz, Portugal
- Notre-Dame de Valère, Switzerland
- Old St Nicholas Church, Germany
- Salzburg Cathedral, Austria
- Sitka Lutheran Church. US
- St. Hedwig's Cathedral, Germany
- Strasbourg Cathedral, France
- Ulm Minster, Germany
