= Cappenberg Castle =

Former monastery in Western Germany

Coordinates: 51°39′03″N 7°32′21″E

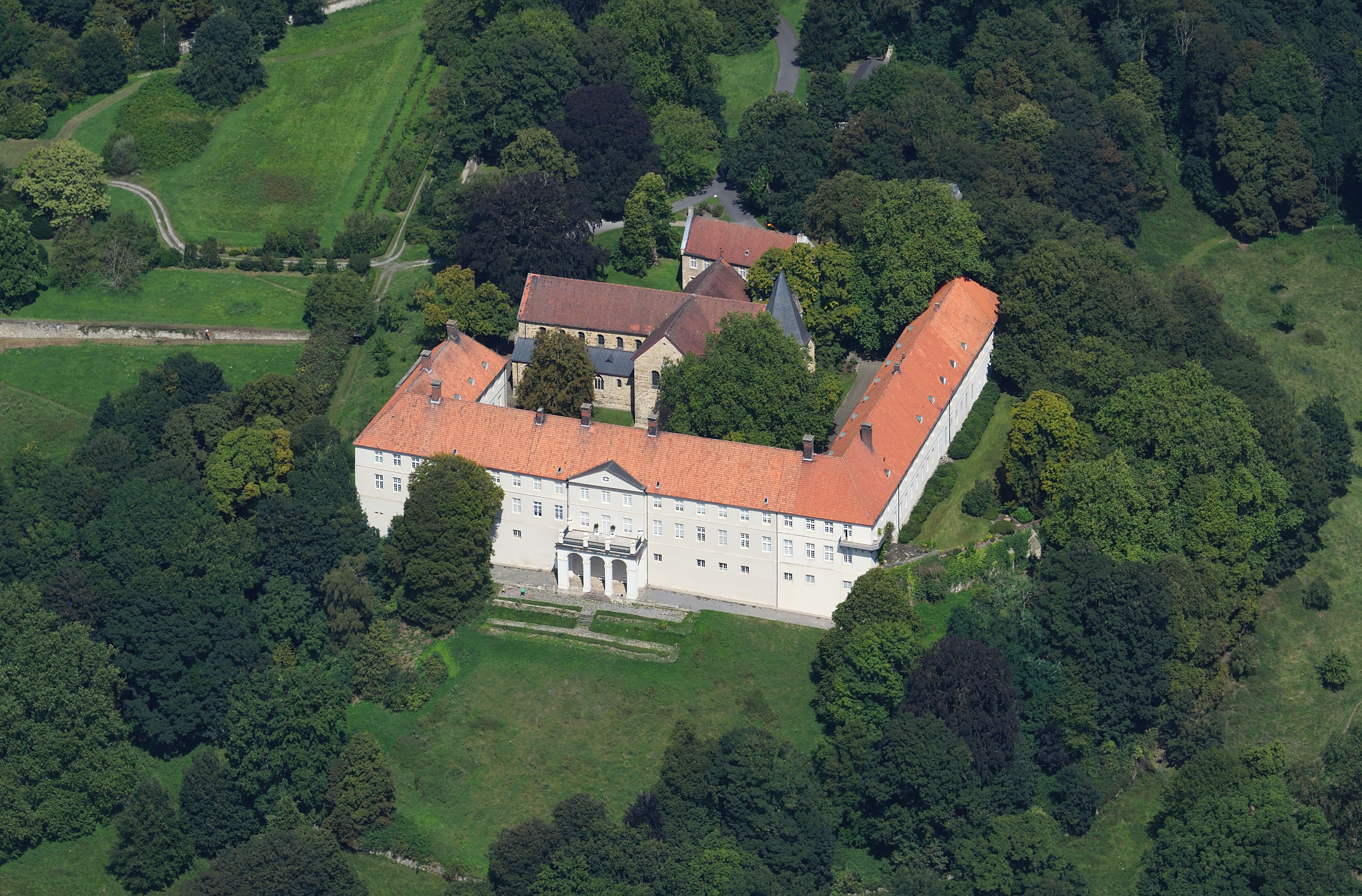
Aerial view of Schloss Cappenberg

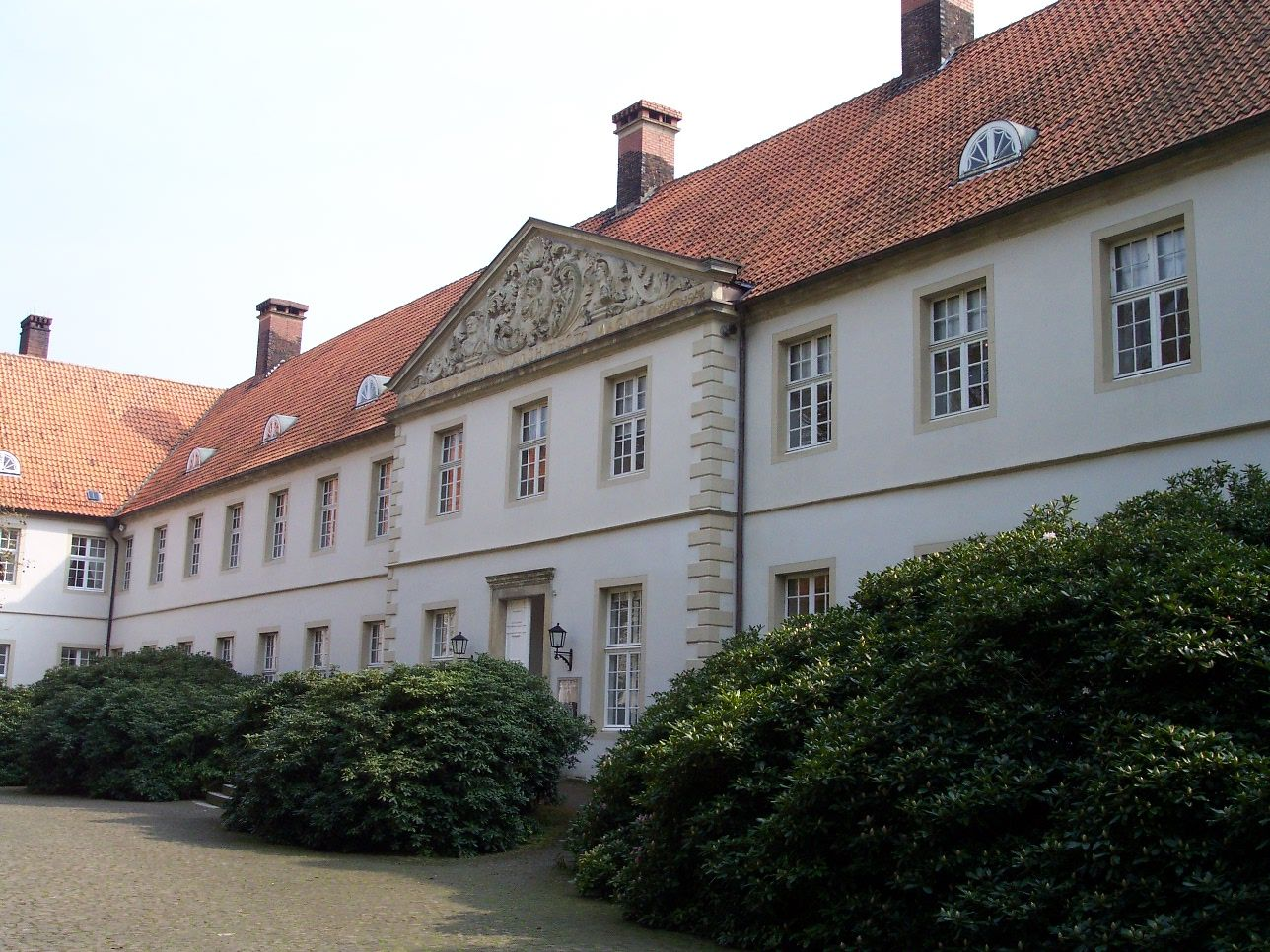
Schloss Cappenberg: central block

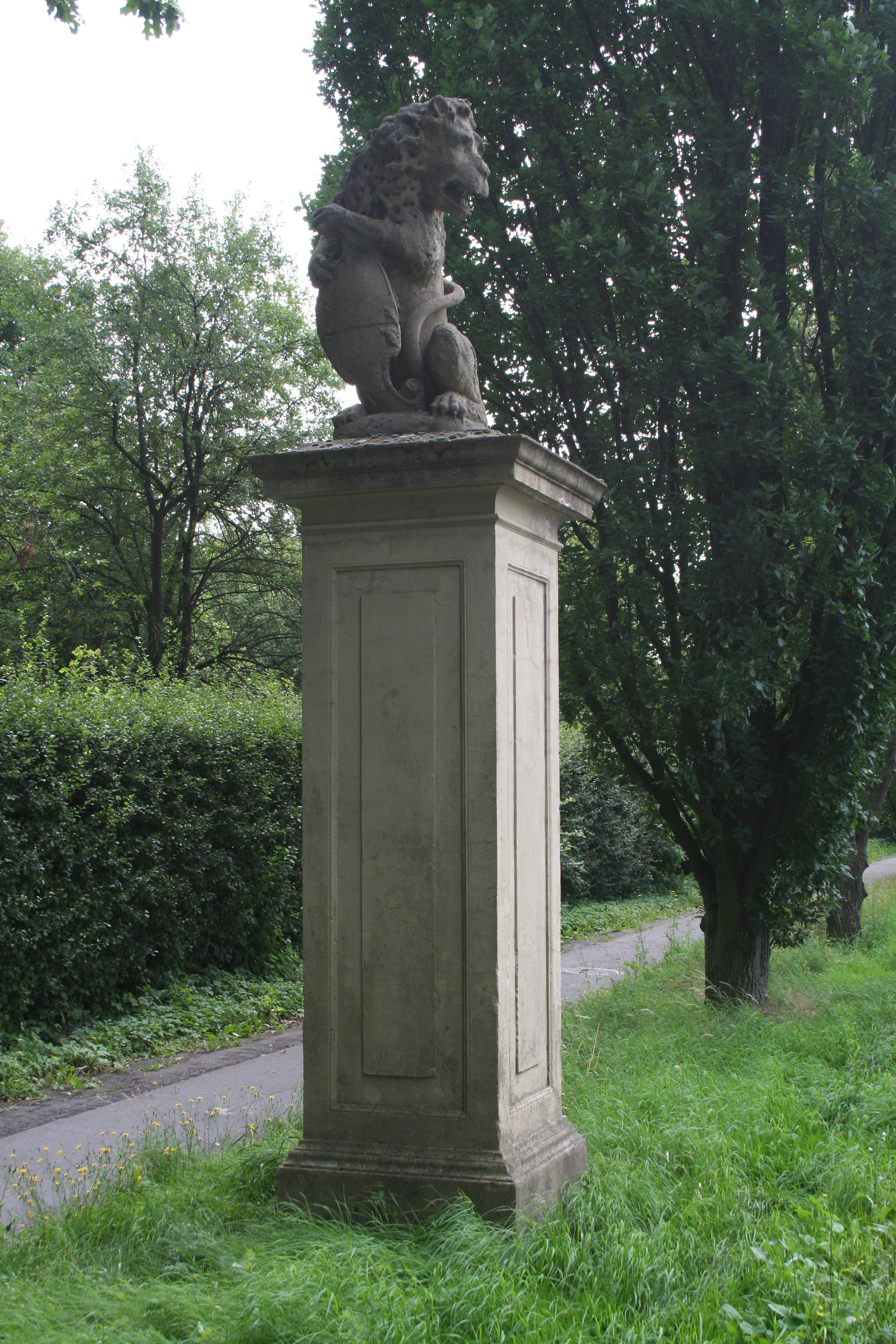
Lion at entrance to Schloss Cappenberg

Cappenberg Castle (German: Schloss Cappenberg) is a former Premonstratensian monastery, Cappenberg Abbey (German: Kloster Cappenberg) in Cappenberg, a part of Selm, North Rhine-Westphalia in Germany. It stands on an elevation, the Cappenberg, near Lünen and Werne, and is a vantage point offering views across the eastern fringes of the Ruhr area agglomeration.

In the castle grounds is a water tower constructed in 1899, now a protected monument, which was restored in 1992. The approach from the north-west to the main gate is marked by two stone lions on pedestals, standing at the entrance to an avenue between clipped oaks. On the adjacent castle grounds are a wildlife reserve and a bird of prey sanctuary.

== History ==
The Counts of Cappenberg, who were related to the Salians and the Staufers, were a rich and powerful family. During the Investiture Controversy, when they supported Duke Lothar von Supplinburg against Emperor Heinrich V, Count Gottfried von Cappenberg and his brother Otto von Cappenberg led their armies against Münster in February 1121 under the leadership of Duke Lothar. A great part of the town was destroyed, and the old cathedral was burnt down. Before the Emperor could bring them to trial for violation of the peace of the realm, Gottfried – either out of genuine repentance or out of fear of the Imperial judgment - gave the greater part of his estates in Westphalia to the founder of the Premonstratensian Order, Norbert of Xanten, renounced worldly life and withdrew into a monastery, where, according to contemporary custom, he was immune from punishment.

After the ratification of the Concordat of Worms in 1122 he reappeared as Gottfried II, last Count of Cappenberg (afterwards better known as Saint Gottfried). Against the wishes of his family he founded a Premonstratensian monastery in his ancestral castle on the Cappenberg, Cappenberg Abbey (Kloster Cappenberg). For his wife, Ida, daughter of Count Friedrich von Arnsberg, and his sisters Gerberga and Beatrix, he built a nunnery next door.

The monastery was economically successful, and accumulated considerable wealth, as may still to some extent be seen from the surviving abbey church. The monastery was largely destroyed during the Thirty Years' War. The present Baroque premises in three ranges were built from 1708 onwards.

After an existence of almost 700 years the monastery was dissolved in 1803 and became an estate of the Prussian crown. After periods under the rule of France and of the Duchy of Berg, the estate was regained in 1815 by Prussia and in 1816 was acquired by the former Minister of State the Baron vom Stein, who renovated the buildings and thus preserved them from dereliction.

After the extinction of the family von und zum Stein the estate was inherited in 1926 by the family of the Counts of Kanitz.

During World War II Schloss Cappenberg served as a place of safety to protect works of art from Allied bombing, including the collections of the Museum für Kunst und Kulturgeschichte Dortmund ("Dortmund Museum of Art and Cultural History"), which were stored here, along with art treasures from various destroyed churches of Westphalia, as for example the Marienaltar by Conrad von Soest from the Marienkirche in Dortmund.

From 1946 the collection of the Museum für Kunst und Kulturgeschichte was exhibited in the castle. The return of the collection to Dortmund did not take place until the opening of the new museum building in 1983.

In 1985 the Landschaftsverband Westfalen-Lippe (Administrative and planning authority for the region Westphalia and Lippe within the Land Northrhine-Westphalia) and the local authority of Kreis Unna rented rooms in the castle and converted them for use as a museum. Since then, in conjunction with the Stiftung Preußischer Kulturbesitz, various exhibitions have been held here. In the west wing are kept the archives of Freiherr vom Stein, who lived in the castle from 1824 until his death in 1831, and also the archives of the former monastery. In the former abbey church is a portrait bust of the period around 1160 of the Emperor Frederick Barbarossa made of gilt bronze.

Nowadays Schloss Cappenberg is an excursion destination, with a museum, and is part of the Route der Industriekultur ("Industry Heritage Trail"). Art exhibitions and concerts are regularly held there.

== Abbey church ==
The former abbey church, St. Johannes Evangelist, is mostly a 12th-century, Romanesque. The church has a standard cruciform basilica plan, with a nave of three aisles and three bays ending in a transept and a two-bay choir. Gothic vaulting and window tracery were added to the church, but especially the choir, in the 14th and 15th centuries. Several pieces of the church, most notably the cloister and the side chapels, were removed during the Baroque remodeling of the abbey, which surrounds the church on three sides.

== Gallery ==
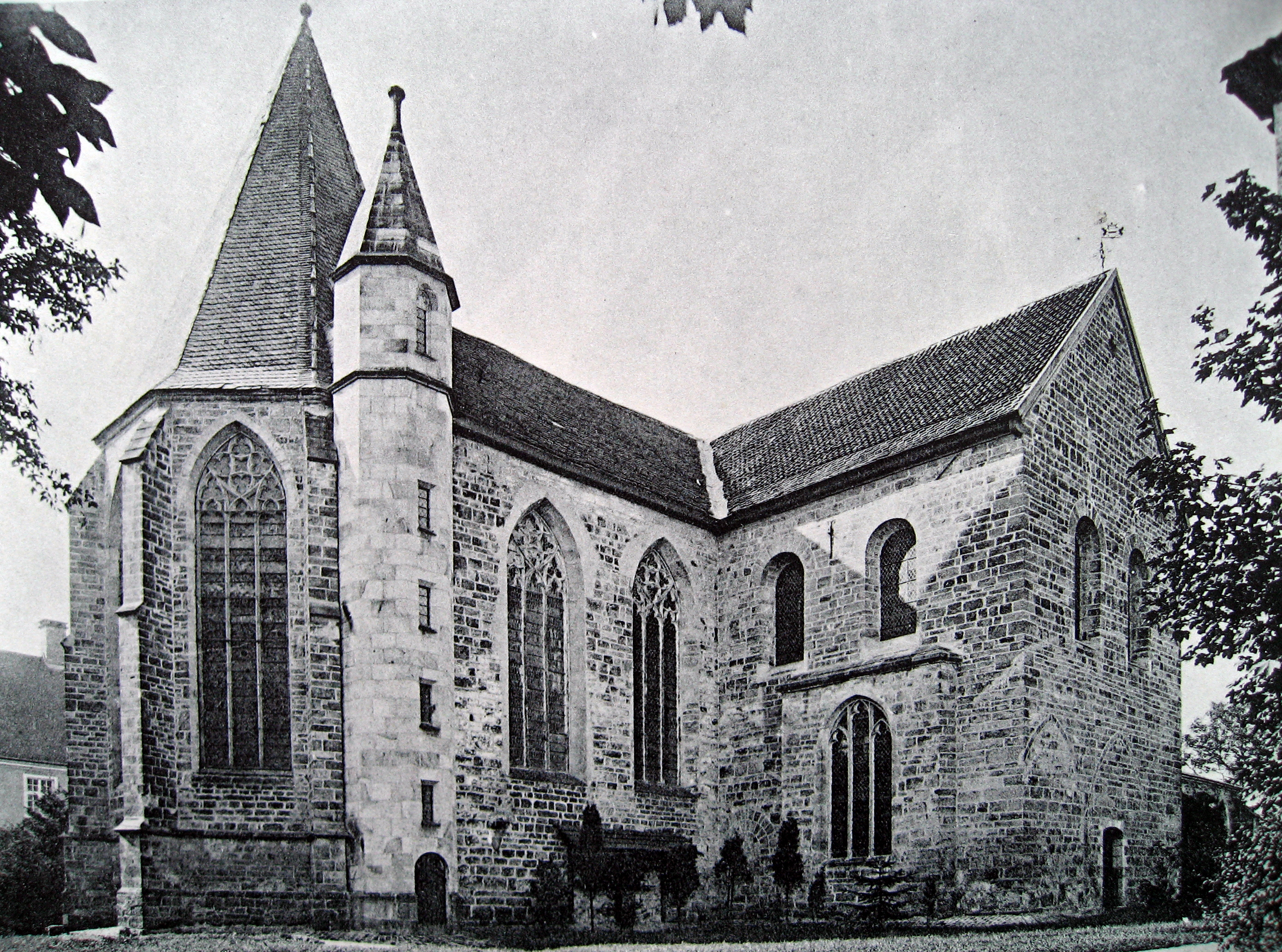
Church about 1890

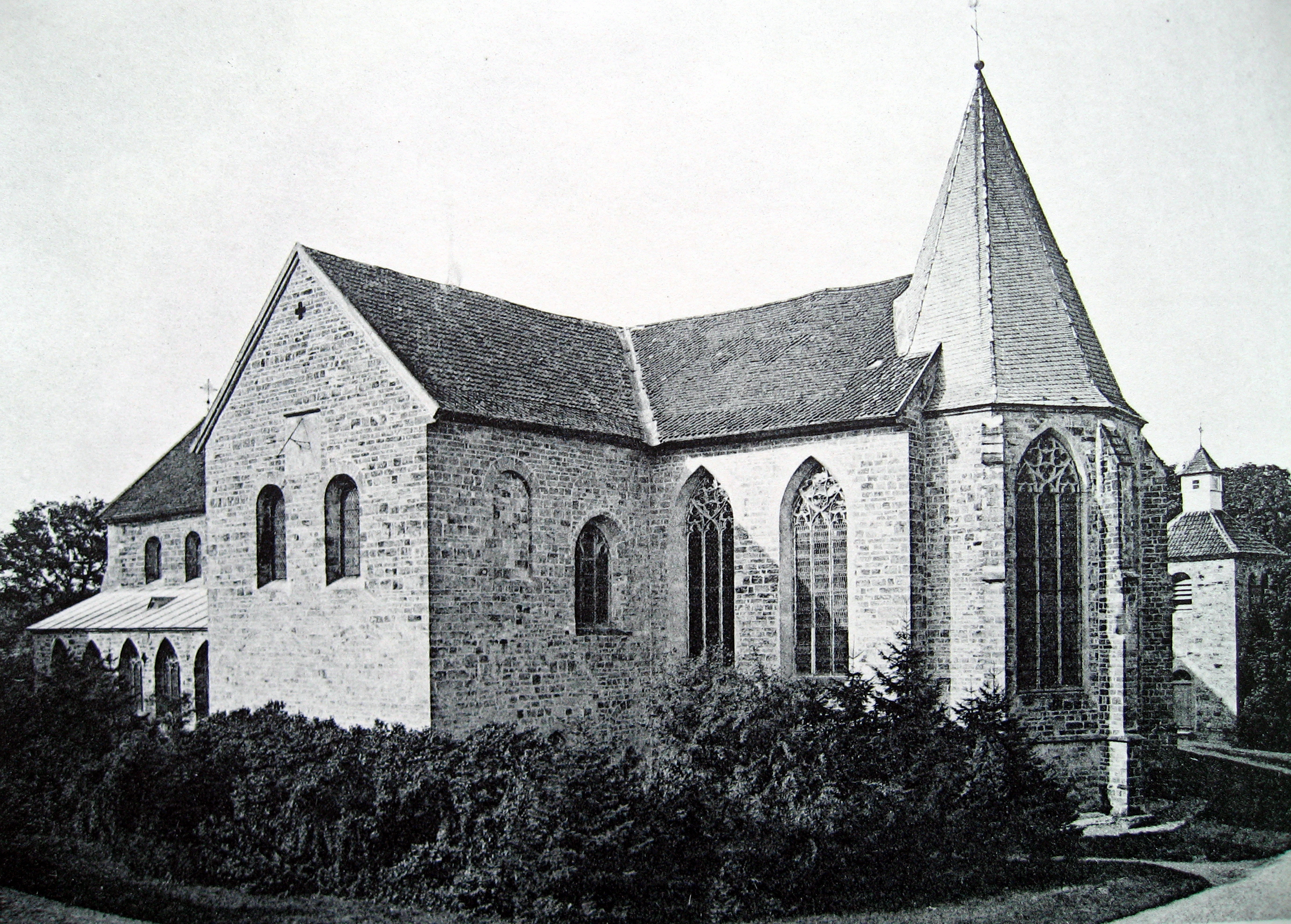
Church from the rear

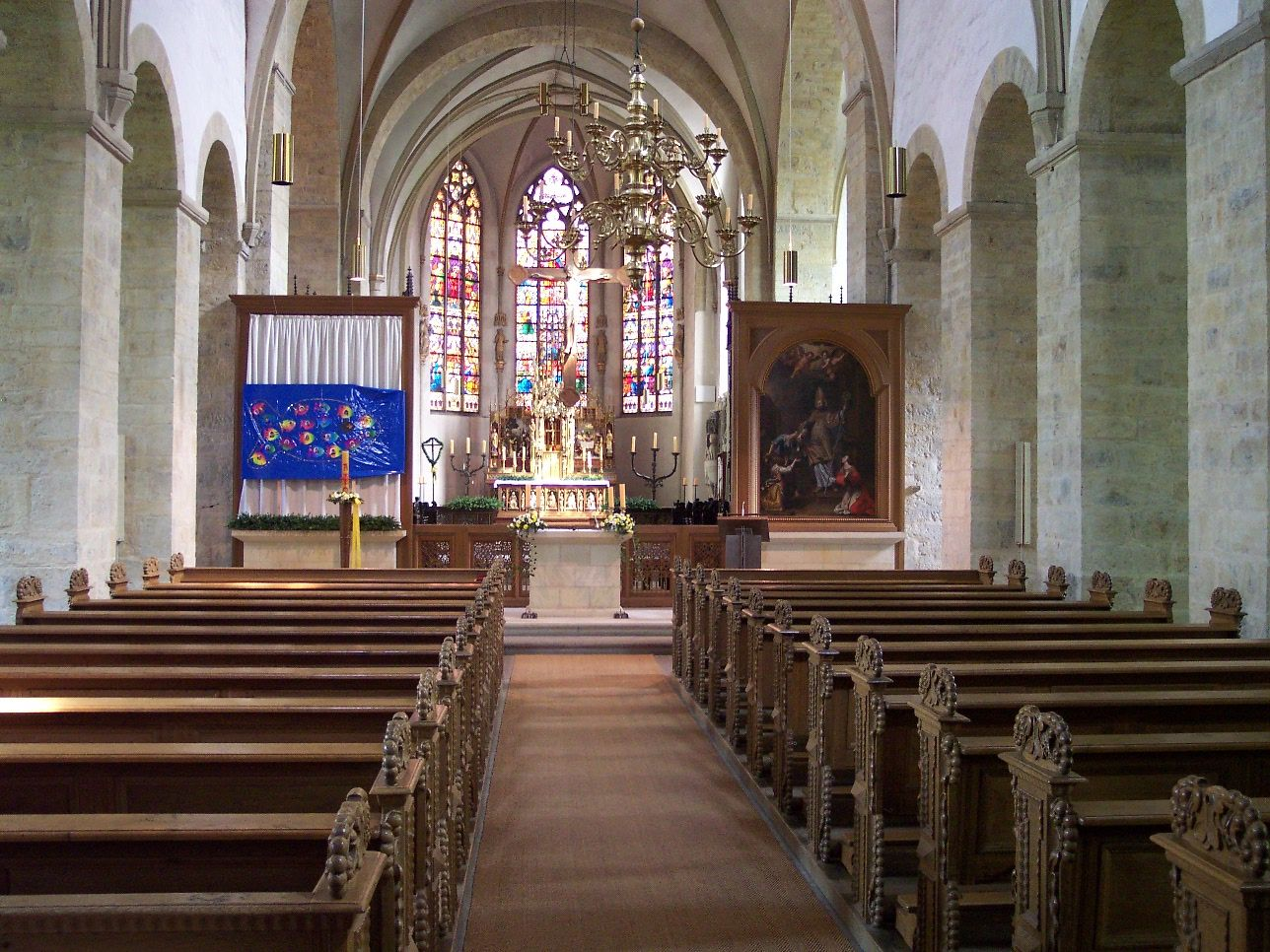
Church interior

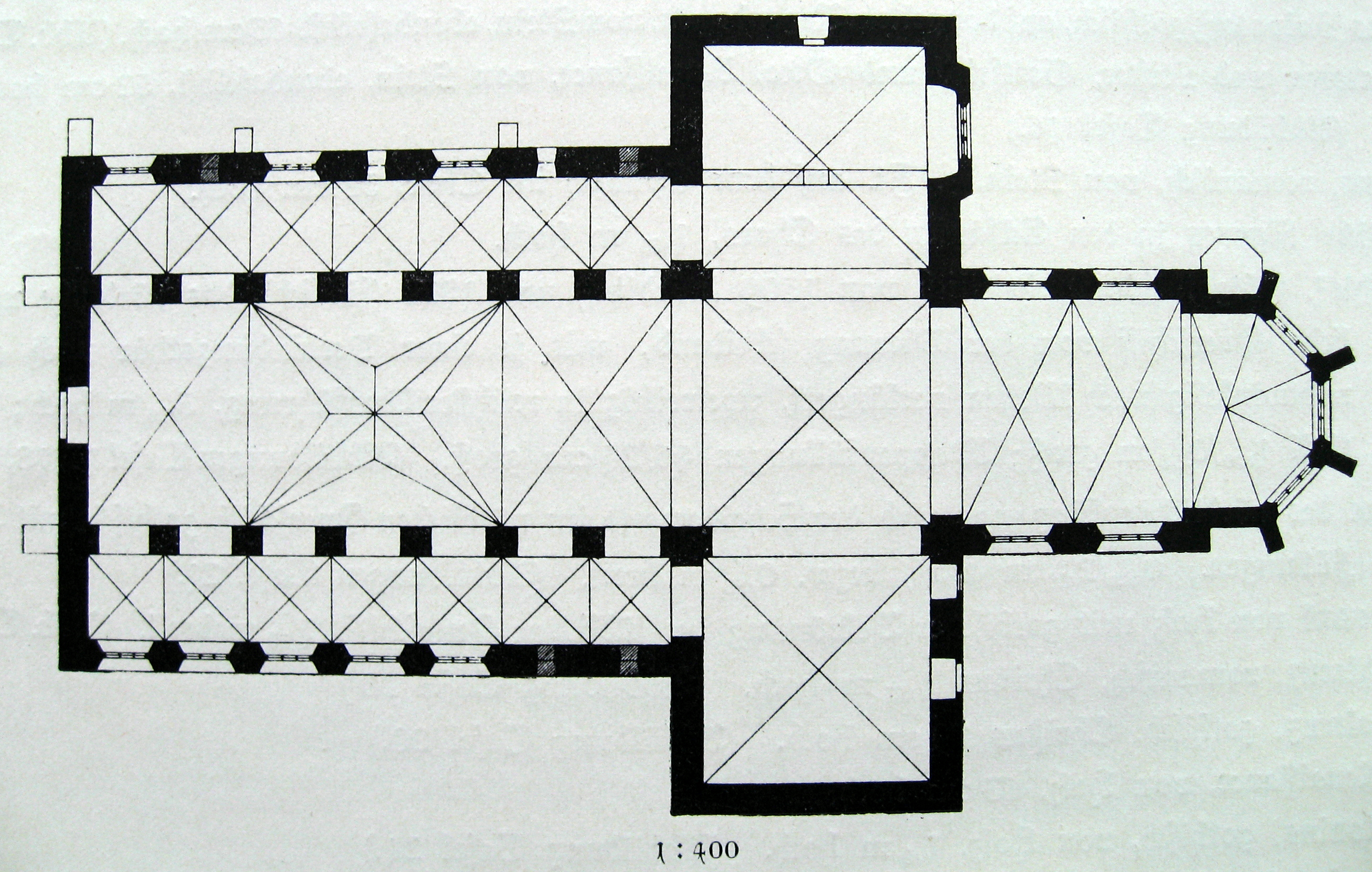
Plan, about 1890

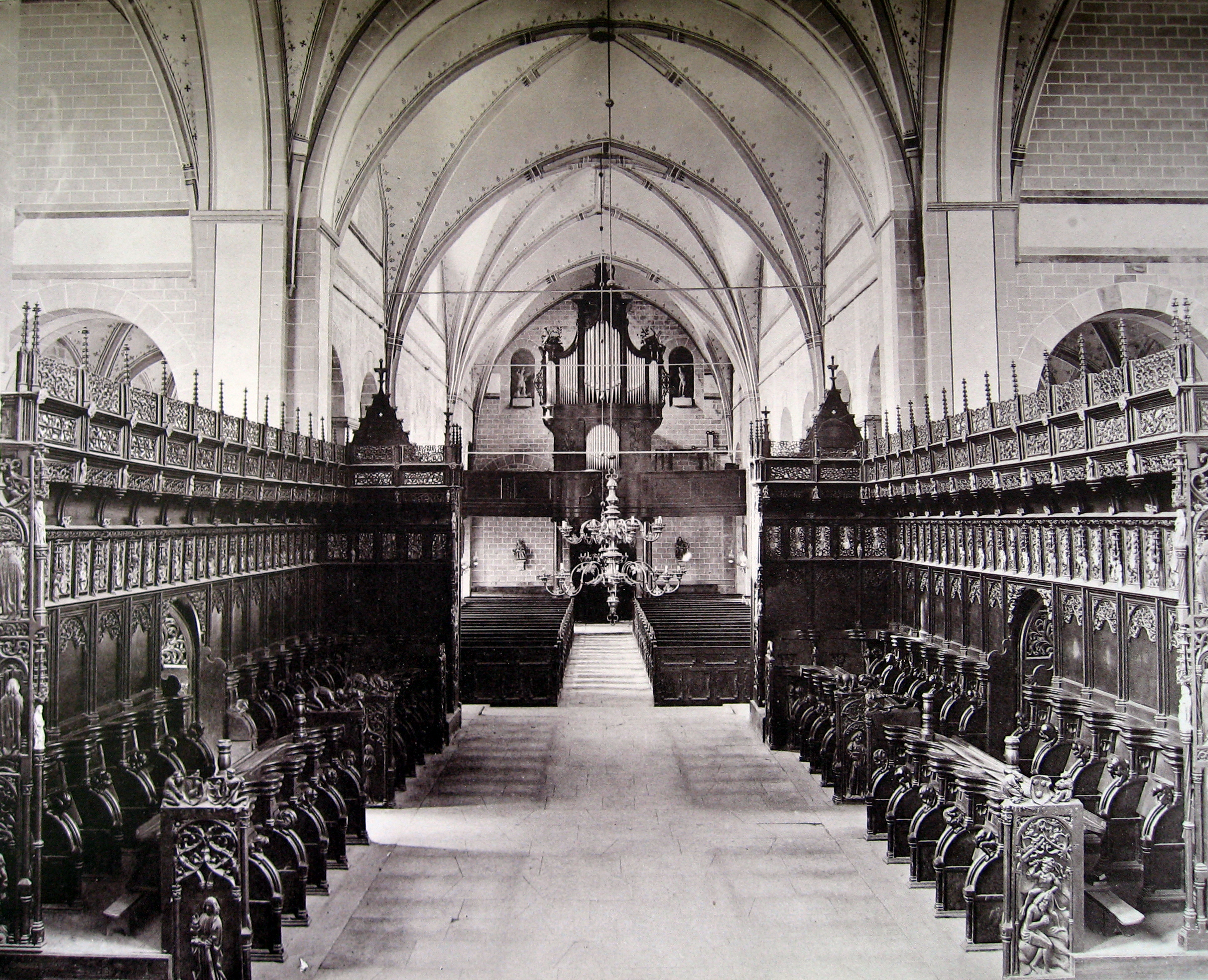
Interior, about 1890

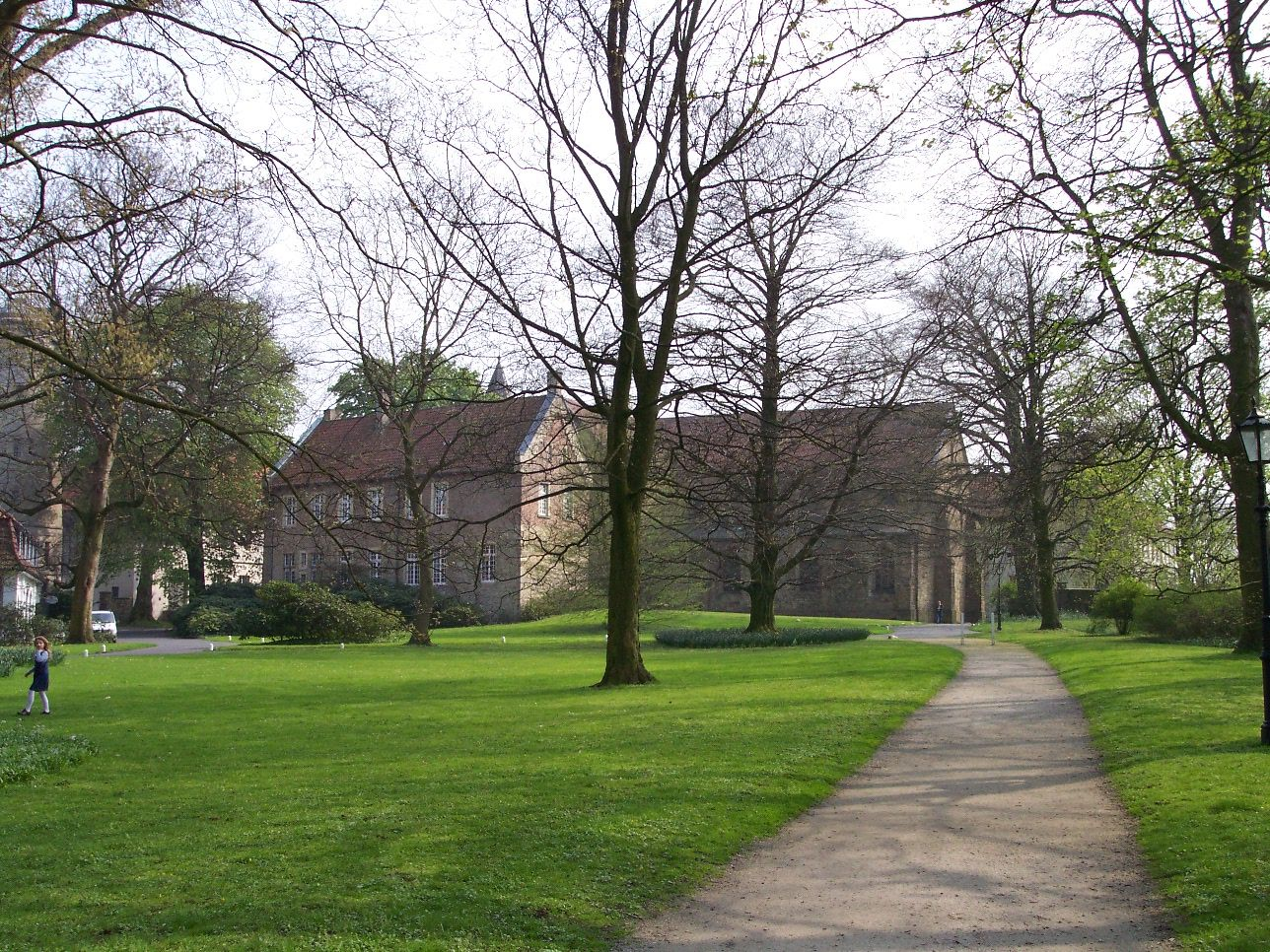
Castle garden

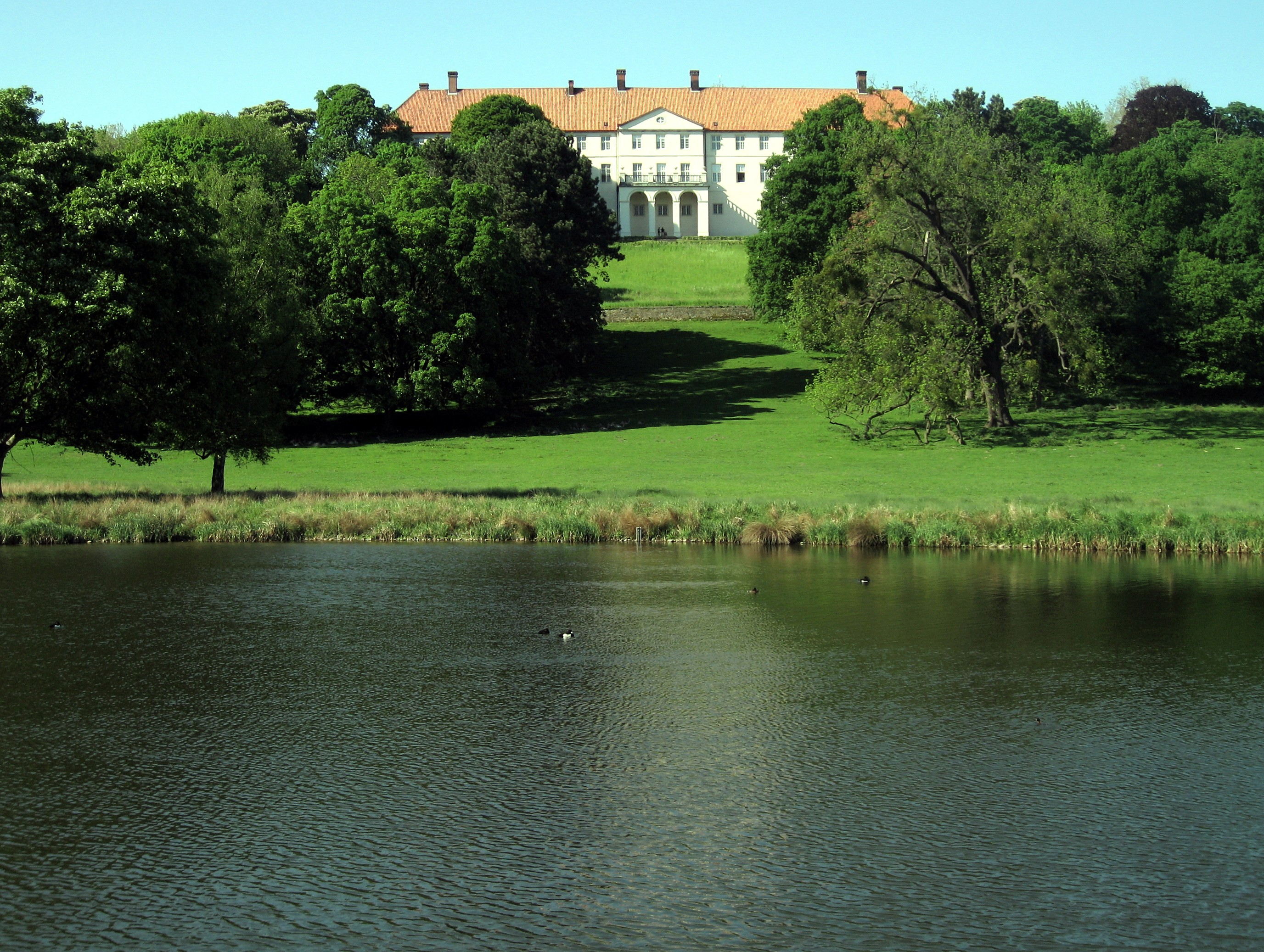
View from the south
