= Marienaltar (Conrad von Soest) =

Altar retable by Conrad von Soest

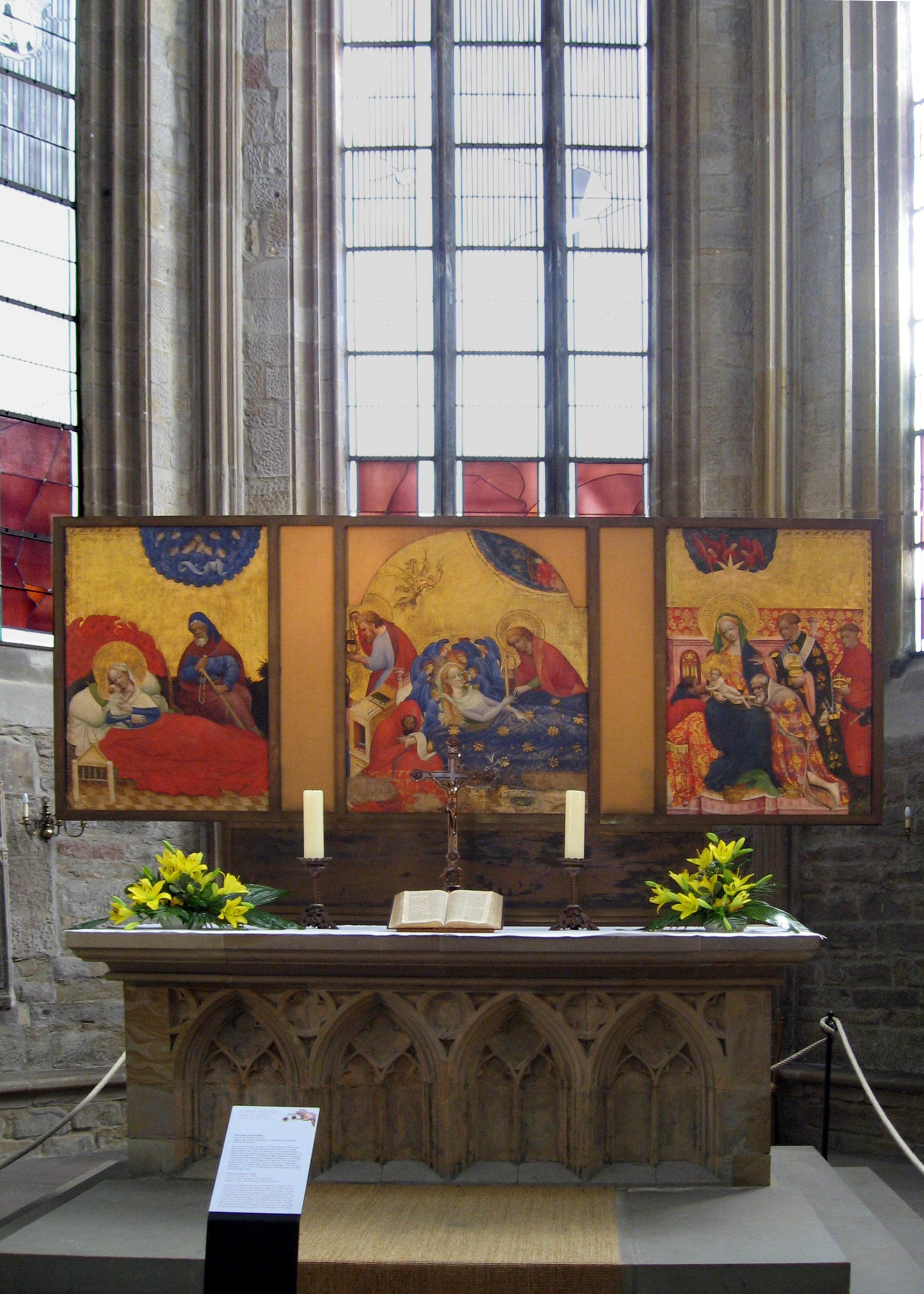
Marienaltar by Conrad von Soest, in 2020

The Marienaltar by Conrad von Soest is a late Gothic altar retable located in the Marienkirche in Dortmund, Germany, dating from around 1420. Executed as a triptych, it is regarded as the painter's most important surviving work and the main altar of the church. The altarpiece, completed shortly before von Soest’s death, is a major example of the International Gothic or courtly style in northern German painting, notable for its refined use of color, gilding, and narrative scenes from the life of the Virgin Mary. Although originally a richly detailed winged altar, the work has been significantly altered over time—particularly in 1720, when it was cut down and incorporated into a Baroque altar structure, resulting in the loss of substantial portions of the original panels. Despite these changes, the surviving fragments are considered a masterpiece of medieval art and remain central to the artistic heritage of Dortmund.

== History ==
Over the centuries, the altar has been subjected to rough handling, and only fragments survive. Originally designed as a lockable altar retable, the panels on the exterior can now be viewed from the rear. In contrast to the interior, they are heavily weathered.

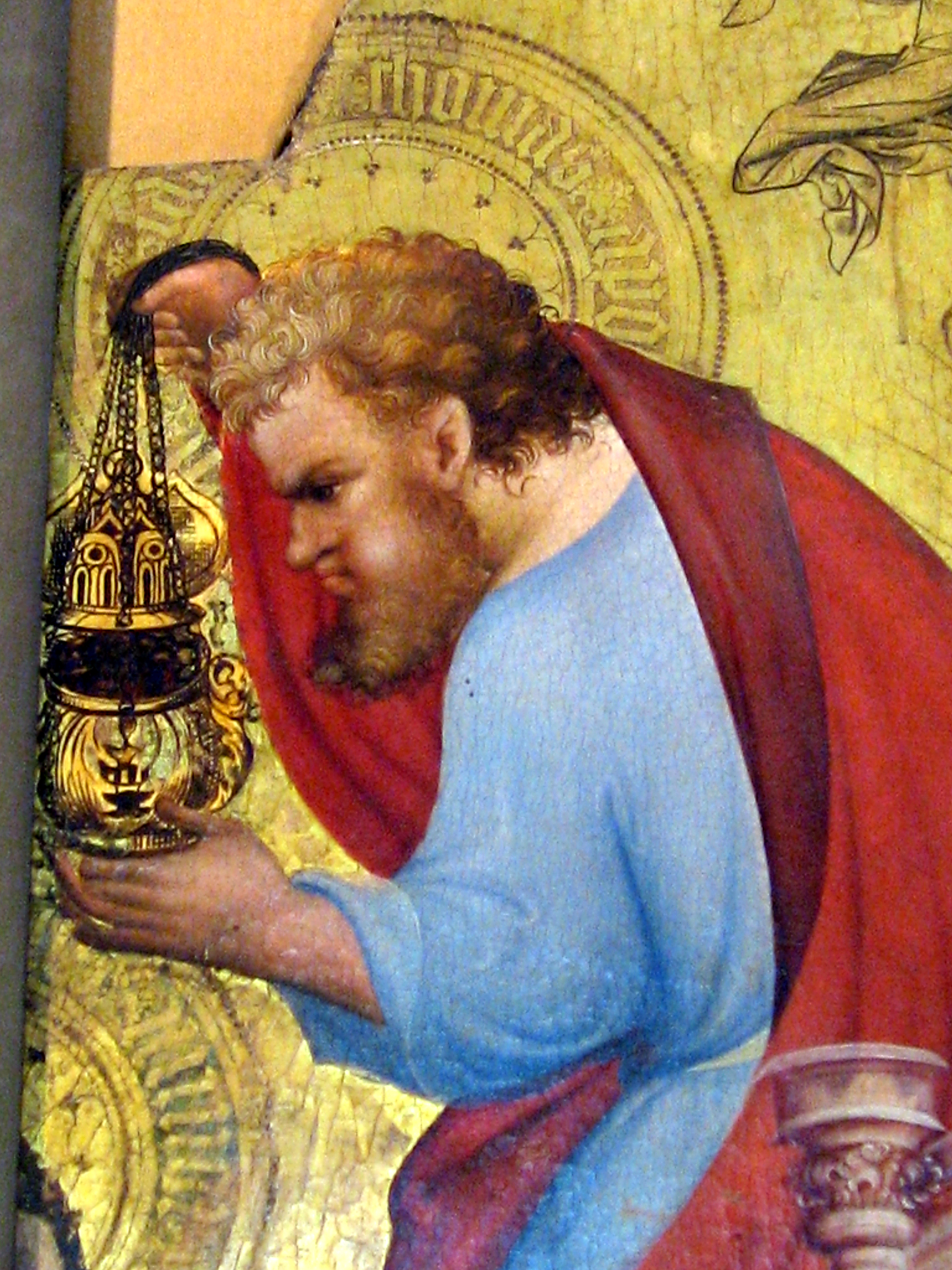
Traces of sawing work on the middle panel

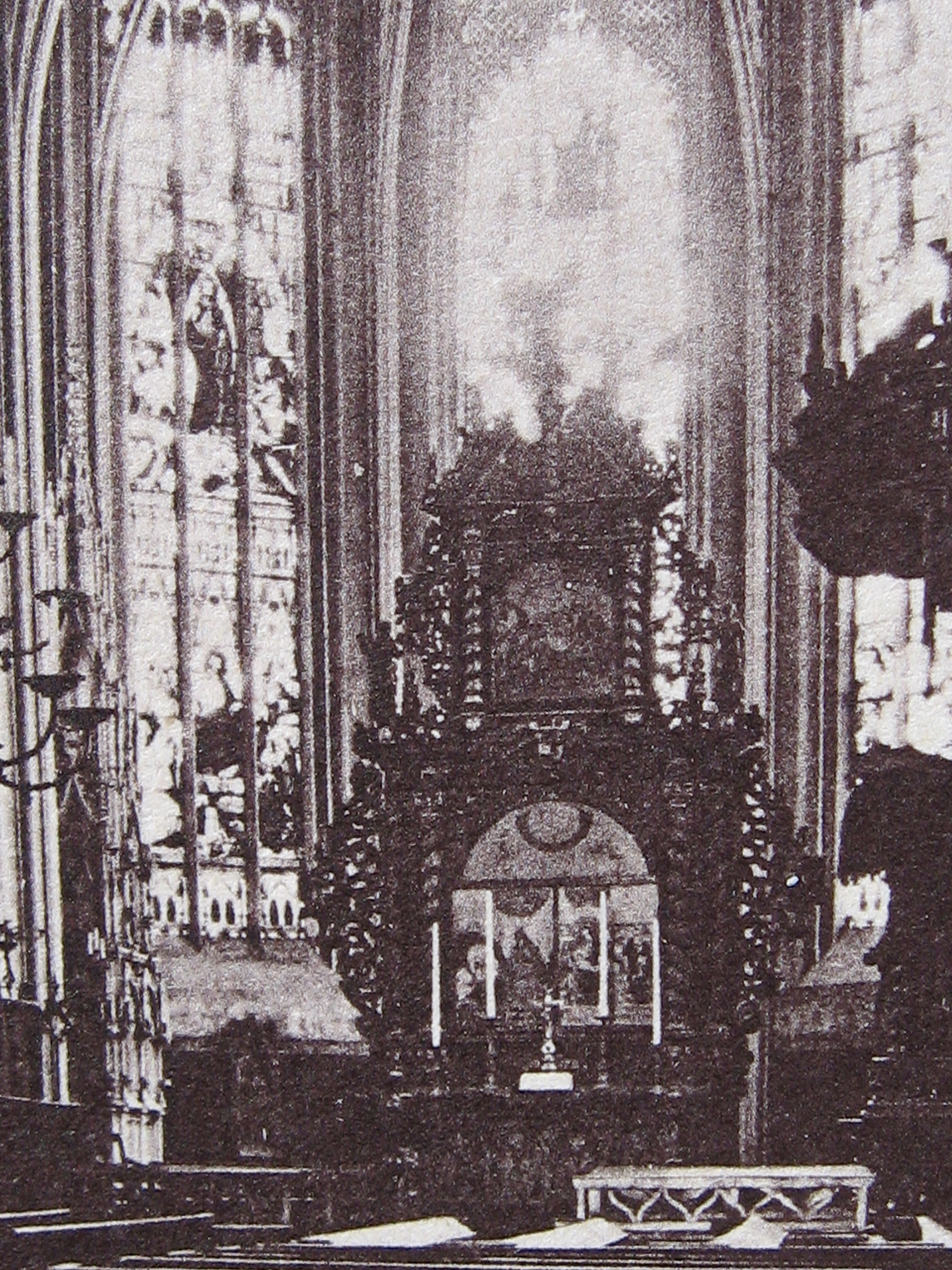
The baroque altar; middle panel in the upper altar structure

The paintings were originally part of a Gothic winged altar. In order to fit the panels into a Baroque altar structure – approximately 16 meters high, donated to the parish by Dortmund mayor Dethmar Wessel Nies – they were trimmed and partially hammered in 1720. This process, unthinkable today given the quality of the artwork, involved the removal of portions of the paintings. The paintings were arranged differently in the carved Baroque altar. The two outer panels were positioned in the lower portion of the altar, with the central panel above them in a vaulted arch. The two lower panels were covered by a lunette. (See also the comments on the individual panels.) At the lower edge, the panels were painted over with banners approximately 20 cm high that placed Jesus at the center of the action and were likely intended to relativize the veneration of Mary. In 1848, the back was covered with newspaper to protect it from final destruction.

In 1890, Carl Baumann documented the baroque altar photographically, while Wolfgang Rinke analyzed the foundation of Mayor Nies on the basis of existing documents. In 1926, the outer panels were to be sawn off during restoration work. The parish of St. Mary had made the Berswordt and Marian altars available for the large "Millennium Exhibition of the Rhineland" in Cologne. The curator of the Wallraf–Richartz Museum, Otto H. Förster, then proposed to the parish that the museum would undertake the complete restoration in exchange for the separation and retention of the outer panels. It was only after the panels had been delivered to the restorer, Robert Hieronymi, that the municipality decided to retain them.

The panels were not divided and sold, and it was only after the war that it became known that they had been saved from final destruction. This was due to X-ray photographs of the panel paintings of the left and right wings, which Ernst Fritz's son, museum director Rolf Fritz, had taken after the war. These photographs revealed that the individual boards from which the panels are composed are held together inside the wood, invisible to the eye, by iron dowels. "If the frame saw had struck such an iron dowel when sawing the panels, the panels would have shattered immediately." (Letter from Rolf Fritz to City Councillor Hansmeyer dated May 9, 1957)

The bombing raids of the Second World War posed a new threat. At the initiative of the Dortmund museum directors Rolf Fritz (Museum of Art and Cultural History) and Leonie Reygers (Museum am Ostwall), the panels were secured in the depot of the German museums at Langenau Castle in Rhineland-Palatinate. According to Rinke's research, the baroque high altar was destroyed in a bombing raid between November 29, 1944 and March 12, 1945. The additions from the 18th and 19th centuries, which had not been removed and were therefore not accepted as artistic achievements during the Second World War, were also lost.

In 1948, the altar was initially moved to Cappenberg Castle in the rooms of the Museum of Art and Cultural History. In 1957, the paintings were placed in modern metal frames and put back in their original order. Today, the panels are displayed in Marienkirche above a Gothic mensa.

== The paintings ==
Marienaltar by Conrad von Soest 1420 (front)

The two outer panels are 1.40 meters high, the middle panel slightly lower due to the sawing out. In addition to the reduction in size, all the panels show minor damage from earlier overpainting and restoration work. On the panels on the back, the former outer side of the closed altar, the paint is badly damaged and is missing completely in some places, especially in the Annunciation. The panels only depict motifs from the life of Mary, an exclusivity of subject matter unprecedented in northern German painting.

=== The birth of Jesus ===
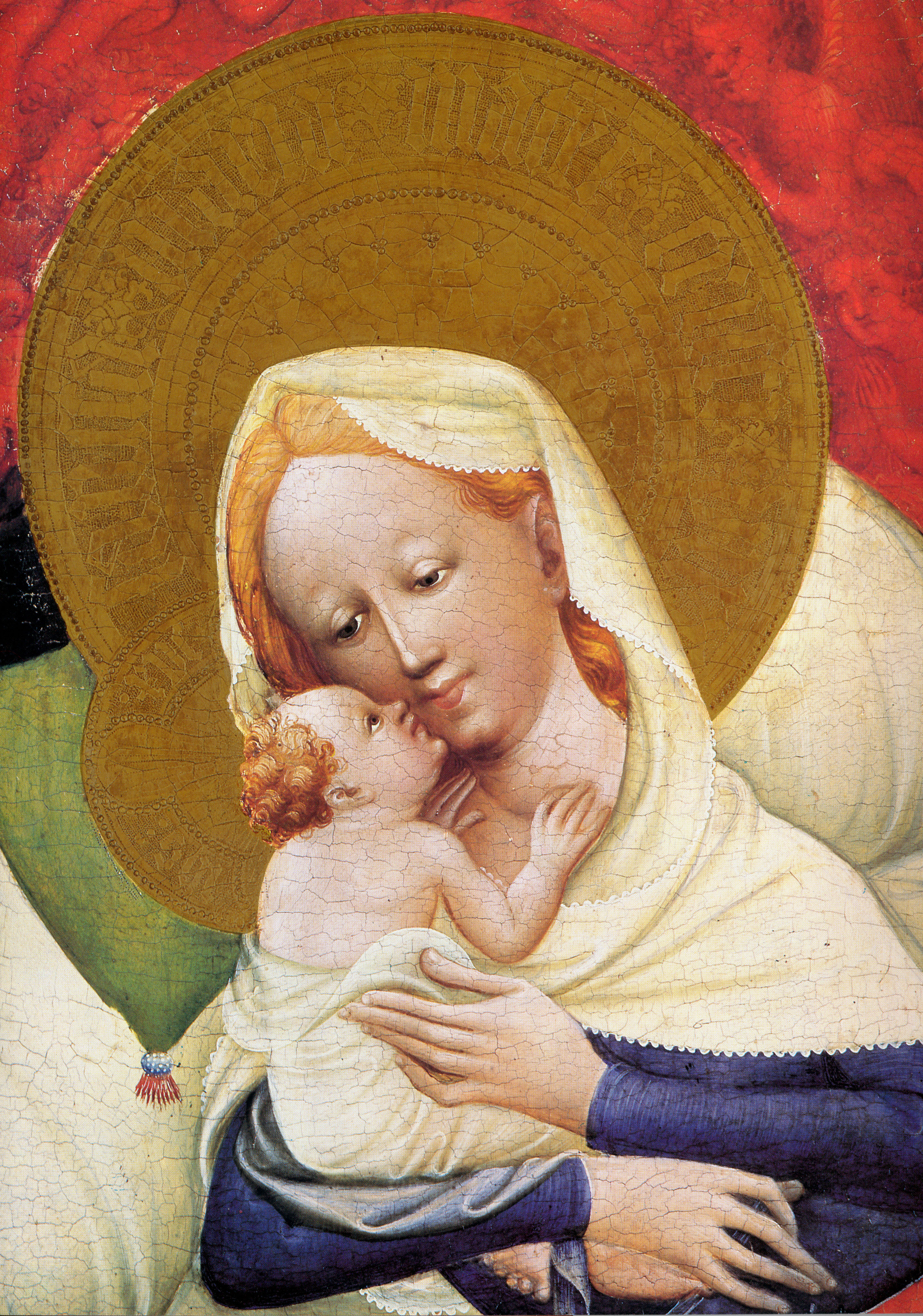
Detail of the left panel, Mary holding Jesus

The colors gold, blue and red dominate the left front panel, which depicts the birth of Jesus. A woven fence behind Mary's bed suggests the stable where Jesus was born. This symbolic allusion is all that remains, as the floor tiles in the room show. However, according to Rolf Fritz's reconstruction based on a copy of the Marienaltar for St. Walpurgis in Soest (today in the Westphalian State Museum in Münster), there was a depiction of a stable with a crib, an ox, and a donkey on the right-hand side of the lost panel.

Upon closer inspection, the fiery red ring behind the bed turns out to be a cloud of angels. The singing of the blue angels high above the bed is indicated by a scroll. The similarity of the angels' faces is striking. The writing in the halos of the Mother and Child is difficult to decipher (Mary: "Sancta Maria, mater Cristi vir(go)" (Holy Mary, Mother of Christ, Virgin); Jesus: "Jesus Christ" (partly in Greek letters)). Against the golden background of the halo, the intimate eye contact between mother and child is clearly visible, emphasized by the uniformity of their brown eyes. Their mouths seem to be approaching for a kiss. Mary holds the infant Jesus tenderly in her arms with her slender hands, while the child leans gently on his mother's neck. Joseph is depicted as an old man with white hair and a beard. The rosary on his belt, a medieval accessory of Marian devotion, refers to his role in the service of Mary and her divine child. The fine hallmarks of the gold background are only partially preserved.

Comparing the painting technique of the Berswordt Master, Andrea Zupancic points to Conrad von Soest's differentiated handling of color.

Conrad reduces the spectrum of his colors in favor of greater brilliance. And he uses color in many different ways. He also models bodies with light. Occasionally – as in the robe of Joseph in the Nativity in his Marian Retable in Dortmund – his color palette is also broadly nuanced and varies between light and dark. In other places, however, he deliberately refrains from characterizing the material properties of things through their colorful appearance.

The contrast between the nuanced colors of Joseph's clothing and the almost pure colors of other parts of the picture is striking. The bright, almost pure red of the cloud of angels above Mary's bed is repeated in the bedspread. The red areas form a frame around Mary and the child, clearly distinguishing them from other elements of the picture. Because of the slight color differentiation, the representation of the angels almost disappears, as if it were an abstract color element. The three-dimensionality of the ceiling is only faintly suggested.

As a less structured pictorial element, the red binds the figures of the mother and child into the surface, thus liberating them to some extent from the laws of spatial perception. [...] Color is used here in very different ways. On the one hand, it appears as a property of things and is subject to the conditions of light and shade based on reality; on the other hand, it becomes a carrier of meaning through its symbolic value: it is given an ennobling function, and in this context it is freed from the rules of real color perception. The luminosity of the colors illustrates the meaning of the figures and their relationship to the earthly world of the viewer.

In several respects, the panel transcends the late Gothic period. The concentration of the action on a few figures against a flat gold background and the landscape, which is only hinted at, show characteristics familiar from the Italian masters of the early Renaissance.

=== Mary's death ===
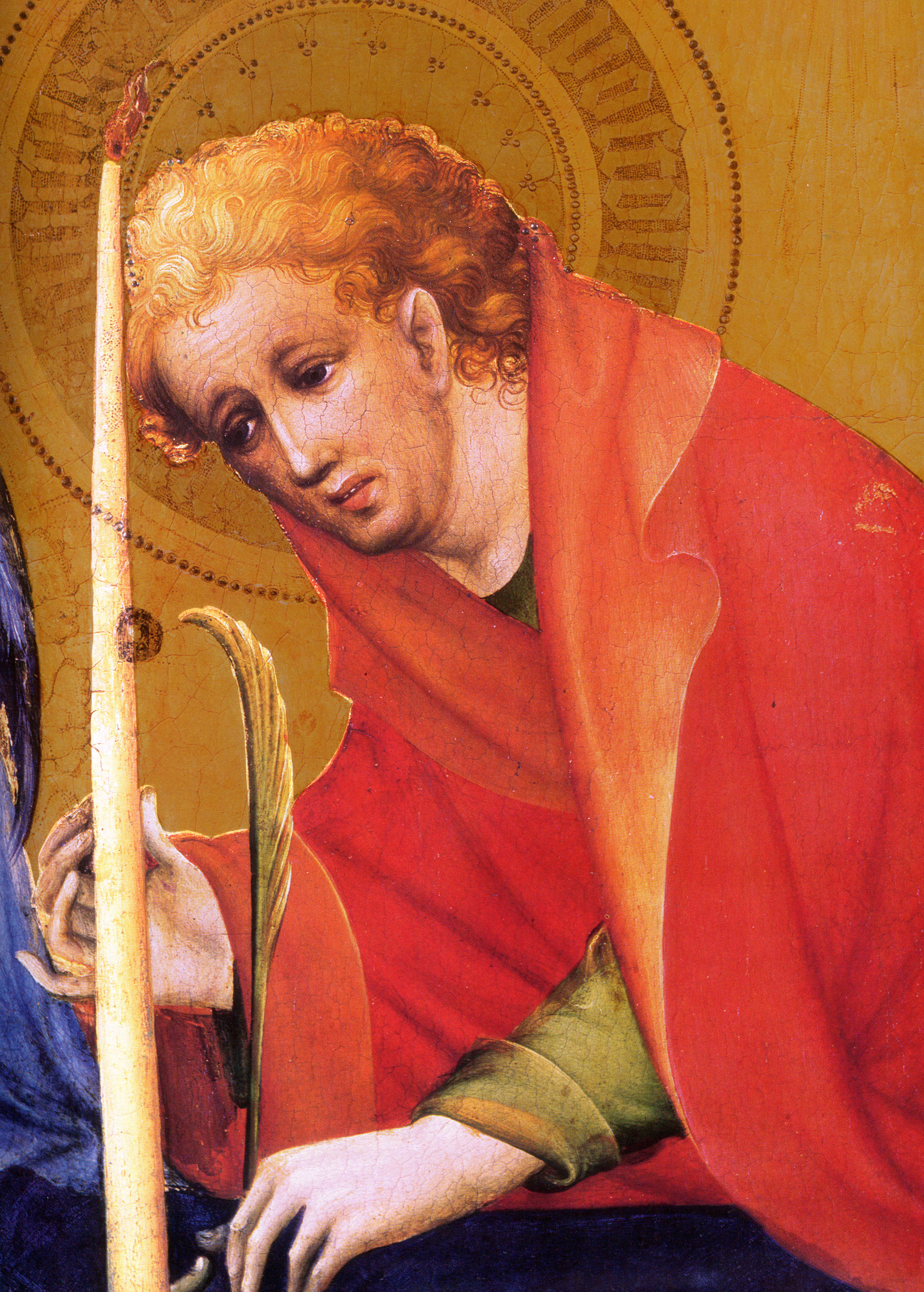
Detail of the central panel, John hands Mary the dying candle

The middle panel has suffered the greatest loss of substance due to trimming, and is also damaged by earlier overpainting in the lower area. According to Rolf Fritz's reconstruction, well over half of the panel has been lost to trimming. It probably originally showed all the apostles at Mary's deathbed.

Fritz has already pointed out that the motif of the panel follows the dormition type of image. According to legend, Mary died in the company of the apostles in the church of the same name south of the Old City of Jerusalem on Mount Zion. Pictorial representations of this event follow a certain typology, which can also be found in the work of Conrad von Soest.

Mary's death is at the center of the painting. Her youthful features, unchanged since the Nativity scene, are striking. Her figure glows against a blue background of angels. Two angels close her eyes and mouth and support her chin, while a third admires her hair, the symbol of her virginity. In her hand, the reclining Mary holds a dying candle as a symbol of death.

Three figures dressed in red surround the dying woman. John, also depicted as a youth, hands Mary the dying candle. The coin attached to the candle and the palm frond handed over with the candle are striking. On the left, Thomas lights the censer. An unnamed apostle kneels in front of the bed and reads from a scroll. He has shielded himself from the actual events with a hood and is concentrating fully on the text. In the present state of the painting, he appears to be looking at an almost white scroll, with only faint indications of signs and lines. After various earlier attempts to decipher the characters (Note: For example Fritz 1950, p. 111) developed an initial impression of the text, the 13 legible lines of the scroll became clearly visible through more recent infrared examinations:

diffusa est/gratia in la/biis tuis prop/tera benedi/xit te deus (in aeternum; Ps. 45, 3b)/ illegible, perhaps final formula: et in saeculum saeculi/laus copia/ Gaudent / chori ange/loru(m) consor/tiu(m) et era/cuiuis deu(s)./alleluja ("Grace is spread out in your lips, therefore God has blessed you. (Ps. 45, 3b) The choirs of angels rejoice and their fellowship, which God ... Alleluia")

Hans-Walter Storck explains that the beginning of the text comes from the Ordo commendationis animae, the ecclesiastical prayer for the dying, known to have been spoken by relatives to the dying since the eighth century.

In the upper right corner of the golden background, a view of heaven opens up, while the motif of the open hand shows that the way to paradise is open to Mary. The motif of Jesus as ruler of the world, which is only vaguely recognizable, is executed in detail on the earlier outer side of the retable in the depiction of Mary's coronation (see below). Two angels descending from heaven are faintly visible in the golden background. Stylistically, they are out of place in the context of the painting, the elaborate robes seem rather baroque, and their heads could be modeled on other angelic figures in the painting. Some sources therefore regard these angels as Baroque additions, others as remnants of the hallmarking of the gold background that had previously structured the gold areas of the painting. Conrad von Soest was also considered a master of gold work.

And Conrad demonstrated his consummate craftsmanship with the drawn and embossed angels on the gold background of the Dortmund Marian Death.

In this context, Wolfgang Rinke's study of the Baroque high altar is interesting. In this altar, as described above, the panels depicting the Nativity and the Adoration of the Magi were placed side by side in the lower section. According to 19th century photographs, the two panels were covered by a lunette, probably added in 1721, depicting two pairs of angels that correspond in style and execution to the two angels on the panel of the Death of Mary.

Their dainty little heads are copied, as are the wings and the baroque-like nervous flutter of the sinuous robes, which contrast with the calm, flowing, Gothic large forms of Conrad's painting.

Rinke assumes that the two pairs of angels in the lunette were additions made by the restorer Friedrich Welsch and the gilder J. H. Stockmann between 1848 and 1850.

In this context, the question arises as to whether this pair of angels above the "Dormition of Mary" is an original component, i.e. whether it was painted by Conrad. For in none of the surviving works is there evidence of such a boldly placed figuration in the space, moreover, with the exception of the Incarnate, painted in a brown outline, thus adding a graphic element. The problem of this pair of angels has not been taken up by either older or more recent Conrad von Soest research – it is hereby put up for discussion.

However, Rinke admits that there is an angel figure in the upper right-hand corner of the Wildungen retable, "whose wings are hastily painted with brown solder". With Rinke, we must therefore regard the questions raised here about additions as unresolved.

With the white lily and the bowl of daisies in front of the bed, Conrad von Soest quotes other medieval symbols for Mary. These include the pale blue unicorns woven into the blue brocade coverlet.

The remains of the figures on the edge imply that there were other apostle figures in the past. The word "minor" is written on the remnant of a halo below the censer. Together with the hands on the base of the book, it can be assumed that the kneeling figure of the younger James (Jacobus minor) was depicted here.

=== The adoration of the Magi ===
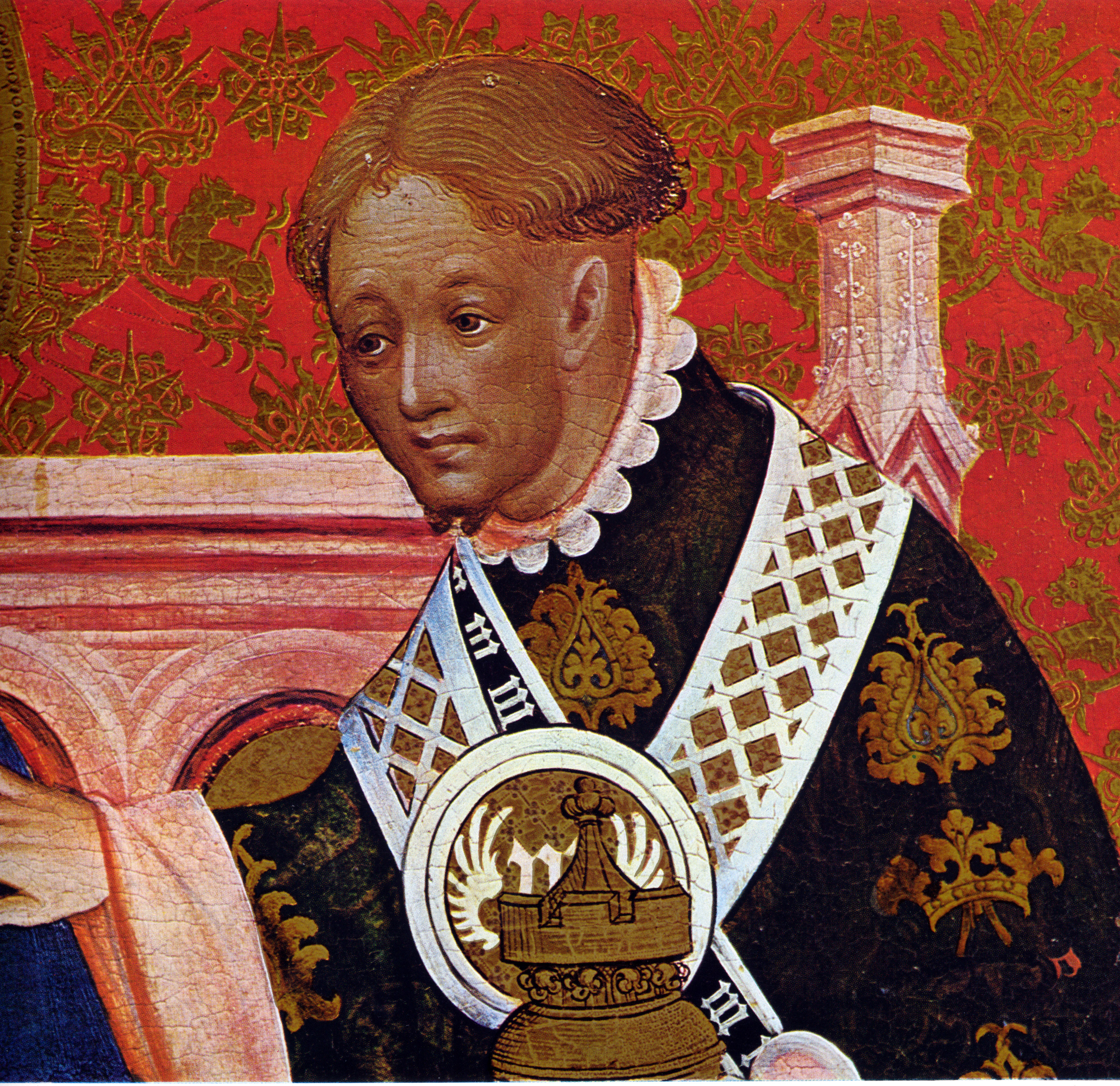
Detail of the Adoration of the Magi; courtly symbols and symbols of the Virgin Mary (including the letter "M") on the brocade fabrics

The right panel shows the Adoration of the Magi. This image has been cropped on the left, so that one person is missing on the left for the sake of symmetry of the figures. Mary's throne is a church architecture that impressed and inspired various masters of the time, such as the master of the Blankenberch Altarpiece. The motif of the architectural design of the throne can already be found in the Bielefeld retable of the Master of Berswordt, a design idea with which Conrad was most likely familiar.

The influences of the courtly style are particularly evident in this panel. The precious fabrics, the red tapestry draped behind the throne, and the brocade robes, lined with ermine in the case of the eldest king, display various symbols of Mary, such as the letter "M" in the shoulder strap of the black-robed king, the griffins, the leaping unicorn, and the pomegranates. According to some sources, the design of the robes and the courtly scene can be traced back to the experiences of the young Conrad von Soest at the Burgundian court in Dijon, travels that cannot be verified. The courtly fashion of the time is also reflected in the old king's beaked shoes, the young king's horn worn on a ribbon ("bandelier"), Mary's plucked eyebrows, and the heavy belts.

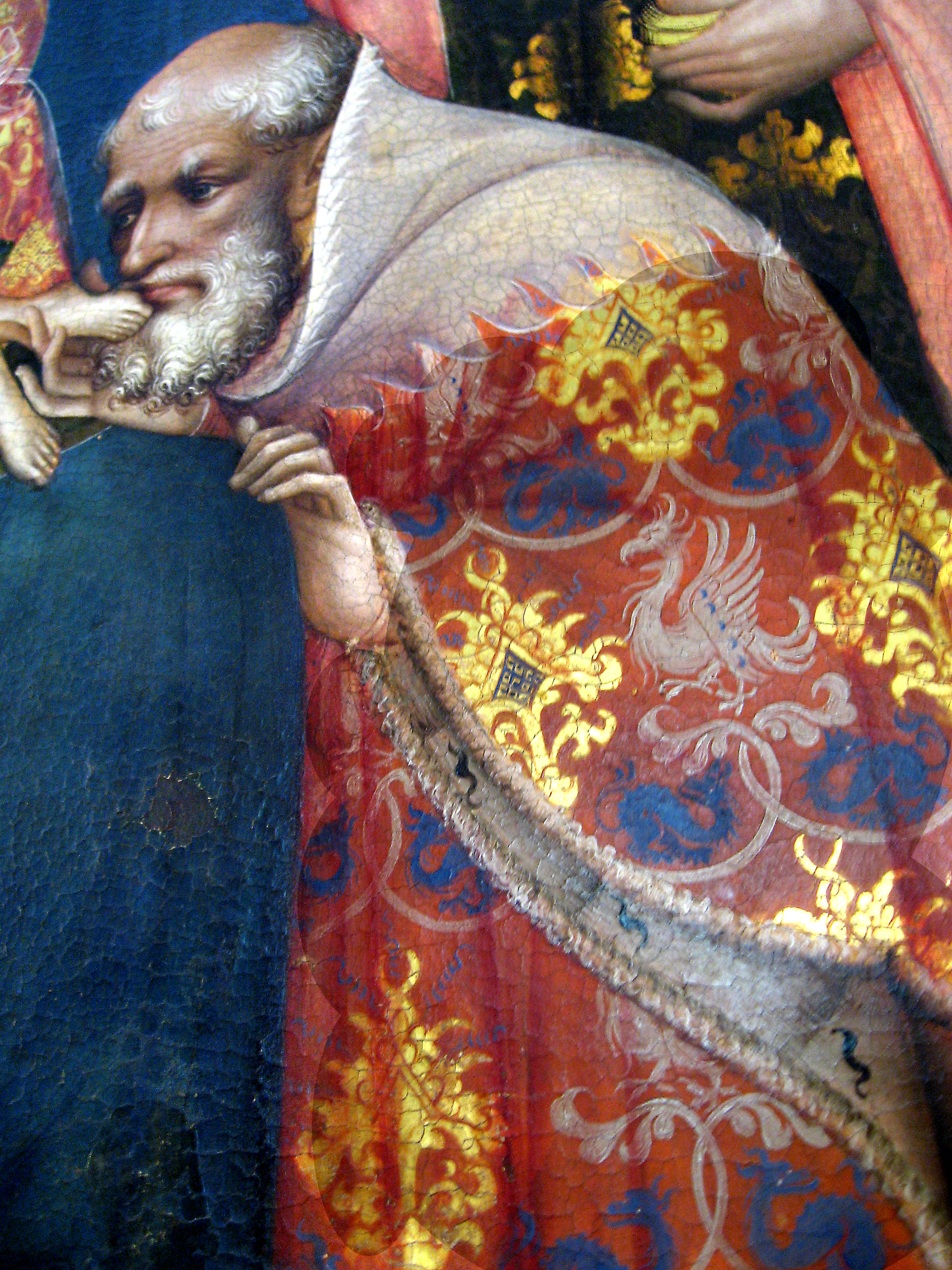
Details of the Adoration of the Three Magi, robe of the eldest king

In this panel in particular, Mary's appearance, posture and clothing reflect the courtly ideal of women at the time. The noble pallor, the high forehead, the full reddish-blonde hair and the slender hands correspond to the aristocratic ideal of beauty.

The costly, high-waisted brocade gown, in keeping with courtly fashion around 1400, which Mary wears during the Adoration of the Magi under an elaborately draped blue and green mantle, is also evidence of aristocratic nobility. As Annemarie Stauffer was able to show, the fabrics themselves bear witness to the trade relations of Dortmund's long-distance merchants.Welzel 2004, pp. 322f

The paintings by the Berswordt Master, for example on the Berswordt Altarpiece, are considered to be the oldest depictions of elaborate courtly garments in Westphalia. Recent research into the fabric patterns (Note: For example Engelbert 1995, pp. 161ff.) shows that Conrad von Soest continued this painting tradition.

The pattern on the fabric is created by applying a layer of gold or silver to the chalk base, which is then painted over. When the garment is finished, the ornaments are scraped from the top layer of paint. Linear embossing mimics the texture of the fabric. The folds in the robes are not followed by the brocade patterns. They are executed over the entire surface without optical foreshortening; the impression of pleating the fabric is achieved here only through colored glazes.

The loss of the glazes can result in the loss of the three-dimensional effect. Contrary to the Berswordt Master, Conrad von Soest has emphasized the glazes more, sometimes in a complementary way. Nevertheless, Conrad von Soest's precise knowledge of the works and techniques of the Berswordt Master is particularly evident in such details. At the same time, the hallmarks show a mastery that extends beyond painting and into goldsmithing.

The figures of the three kings symbolize the reconciliation of the world through the birth of Jesus. With them, youth, maturity, and old age come together in common worship. At the same time, the kings represent the different tribes of humanity scattered throughout the world. A connecting line between the kings is created by the hands of the kings touching the Child or Mary. The child Jesus turns to the king of mature manhood, who kisses his left hand. The old king holds the child's right foot and touches it with his mouth. Mary's throne is in the form of a castle or church facade. Conrad von Soest omits the gender of the unclothed infant Jesus.

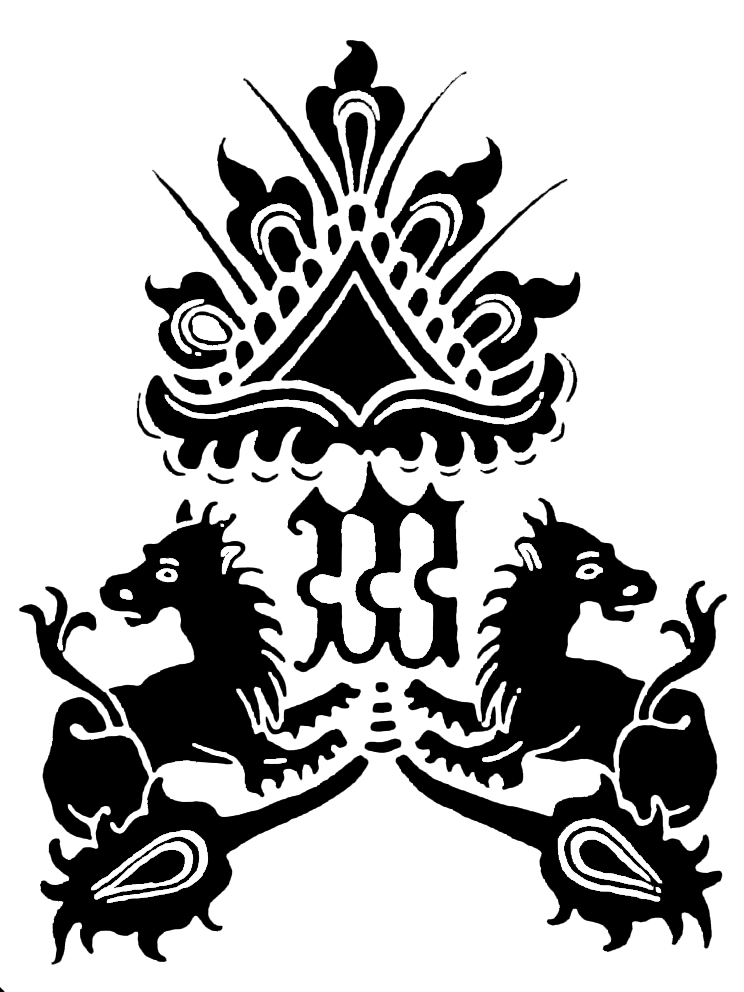
Isolated motif from the background (A. Ludorff 1894)

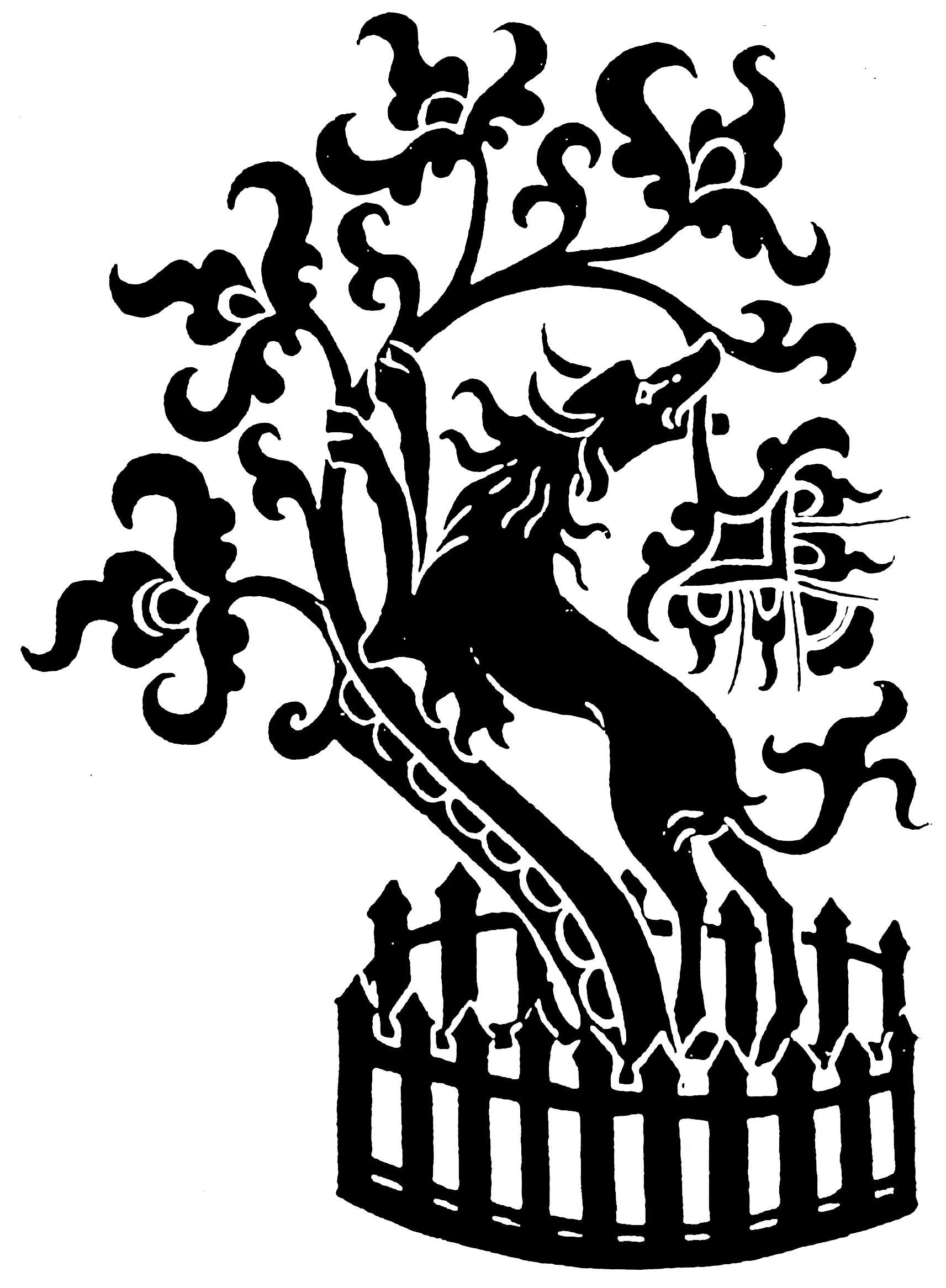
Isolated motif of the altarpiece of the left king (A. Ludorff 1894)

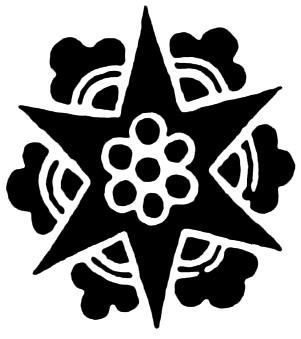
Pomegranate motif (Ludorf)

=== The panels on the back ===
The panels on the back of the altar show the coronation of Mary by Jesus as ruler of the world and the Annunciation scene, the former face of the altar in its closed state. With the Annunciation and the Coronation, the more muted colors of the everyday view also provide a temporal framework for the events on the inner panels. The link between beginning and end is also established by the strikingly long and slender identical scepter held by the angel in the Annunciation scene and by the heavenly Jesus in the Coronation scene.

Marienaltar by Conrad von Soest 1420 (back)

The coronation scene shows Mary in heaven, surrounded by a wreath of angels. Jesus presents her with a scepter and a crown of pearls as coronation symbols. Mary wears a cloak of the blue color of heaven with a gold clasp. Jesus is identified as King by his crown and red robe. The words ego sum can still be deciphered in Jesus' halo, perhaps with the addition of resurrectio et vita (I am the resurrection and the life).

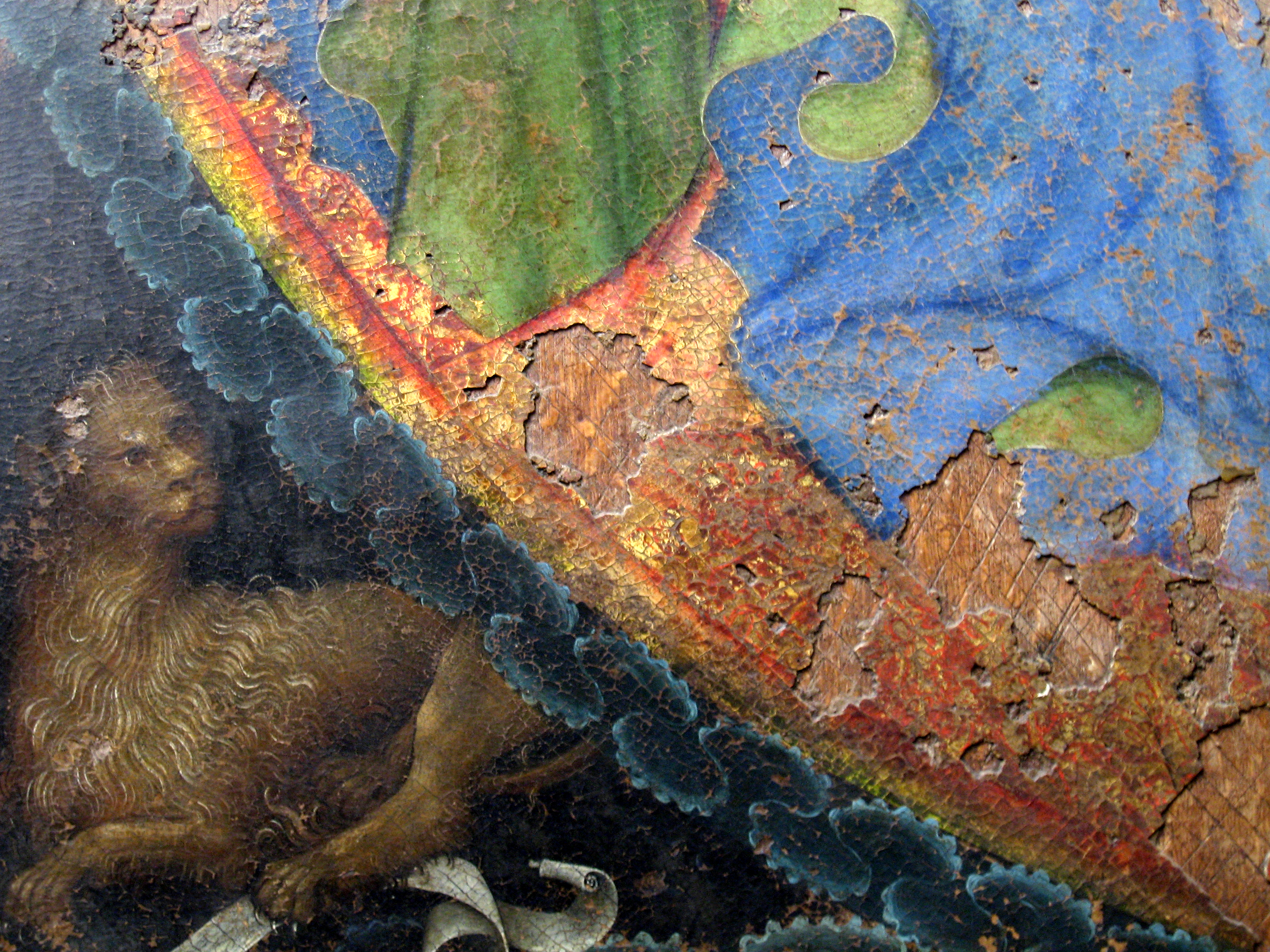
Detail of the coronation scene

In the corners of the painting are the symbols of the four evangelists, additionally marked by a scroll. The lion for Mark and the winged man for Matthew are still visible. The bull and eagle symbols were cut off when the painting was trimmed.

The Annunciation scene shows Mary in a church-like room. The angel carries a scroll with the inscription Ave gratia plena dominus (tecum?) (Hail (Mary), full of grace, the Lord (is with you)). Mary's tilted head indicates her decision to obey. In the lower left corner above Mary's head, in the background of the painting, the blessing figure of God can be seen, with golden rays shining towards Mary. Remnants of white feathers can be seen on the upper edge of Mary's halo, perhaps the remains of the dove that hovers over Mary as a symbol of the Holy Spirit in depictions of this scene. The word Sancta can still be seen in Mary's halo. The vase of white lilies at the right edge of the picture is a symbol of Mary's purity.

== Meaning of the painting ==
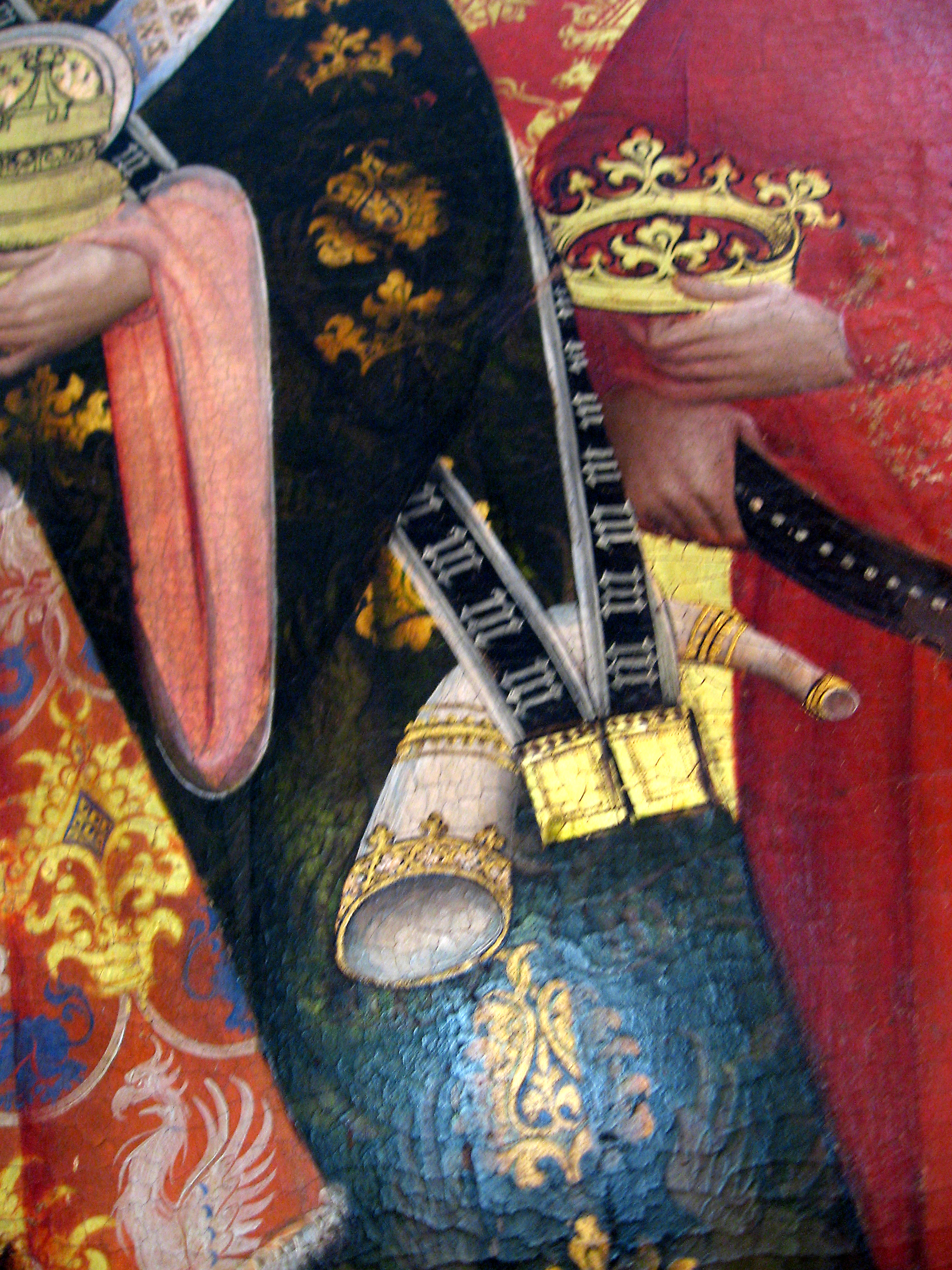
Courtly robes, horn on the bandelier, details of the Adoration of the Magi

The fascination of the painting is based on several aspects. The bright colors, the unusual size of the figures for the time, and the harmony of the composition all play a role. The painting shows medieval stylistic elements, such as the two-dimensional gold backgrounds, the size of the figures according to their religious significance, or the telling of biblical stories. At the same time, the development of Renaissance painting, the design of perspective, the faces of the time and the anatomy of the bodies are fascinating. The heavy use of gold, blue, and red, which were particularly expensive, also reflects the patrons' desire for representation.

In the 15th century, images of the Virgin Mary were not only works of art or sacred objects, but also the expression and object of identification of a social group or fraternity. In Conrad von Soest's Marienaltar, the self-confidence of the Free Imperial City of Dortmund becomes clear. This is not only due to the material value of the painting, but also to the aristocratic, self-confident attitude it expresses. Furthermore, as a visible sign of a Marian brotherhood, the paintings served the cohesion and self-representation of a social group within the city. Conrad von Soest belonged to several such brotherhoods.

The artistry of the paintings, as well as the innumerable motifs and the repertoire of figures, clearly refer to the art of the French courts. It is rightly assumed that Conrad traveled to Paris. However, it is not enough to deduce the motifs from the painter's knowledge. It is equally important to note that the patrons apparently wanted such a style and such a level of refinement to be shared at this location in Dortmund. We can assume that Dortmund's merchants and the City Council were well aware of the style and level of sophistication of the Marienretabel. With this painting, they placed themselves – with the self-confidence of a free imperial city and successful Hanseatic city – on the same level as the international aristocracy.

At the same time, however, the urban self-confidence towards this aristocracy is also expressed. Barbara Welzel sees the adoration scene of the Magi touching Jesus as a deliberate violation of courtly rituals, an expression of a particular mentality of the urban burghers.

== Hidden signature ==
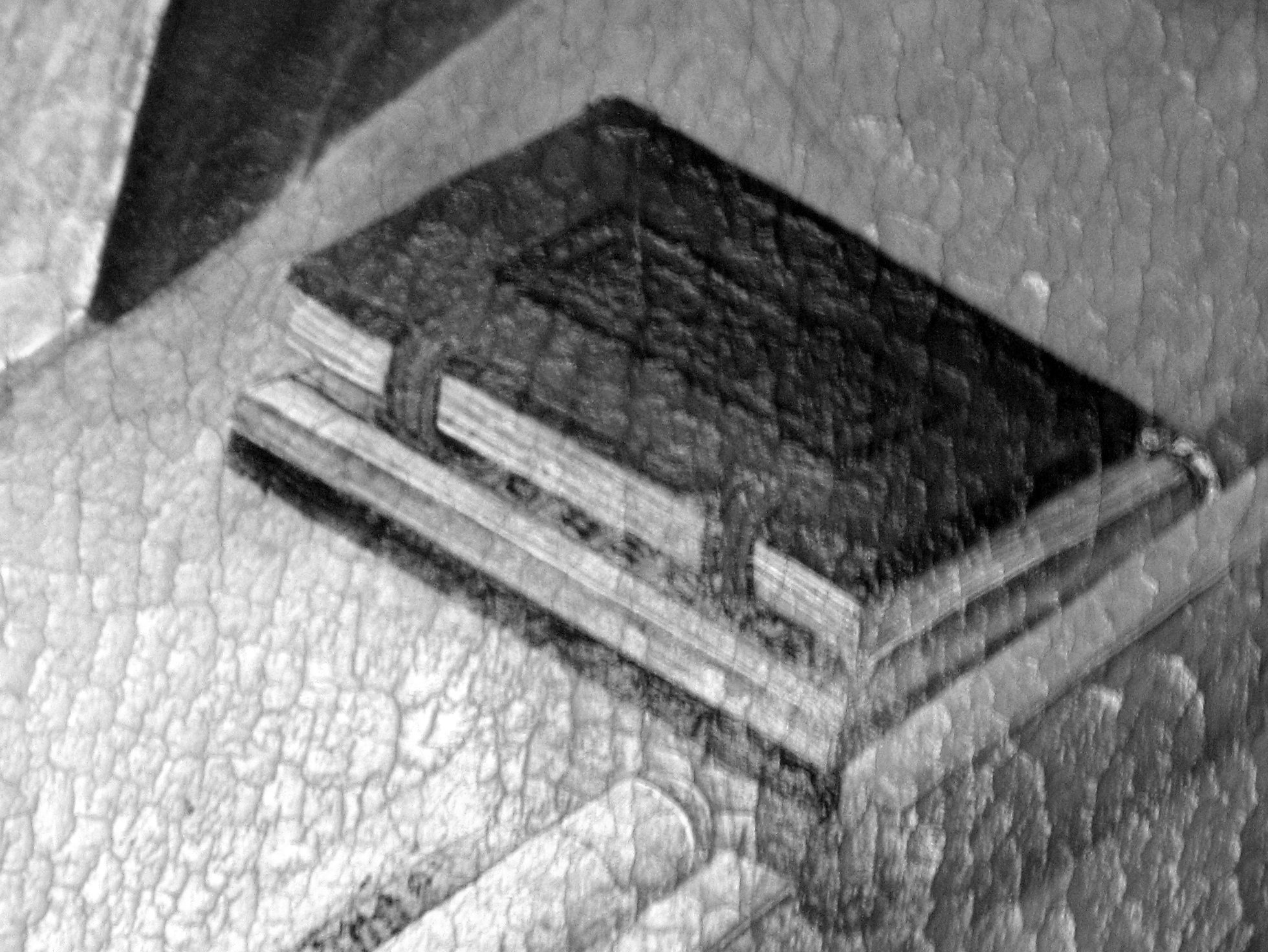
Signature under the bookclasps

Since 1920, art historians suspected that the Marian altarpiece was the work of Conrad von Soest. The exact attribution to Conrad von Soest could only be made in 1950, when the director of the Museum of Art and Cultural History in Dortmund, Rolf Fritz, discovered a signature of the Dortmund master hidden in a detail of the painting.

In the middle painting, behind Mary's deathbed is a table with a book whose clasps open the pages slightly. Four upside-down letters (con..d) can be seen, which can be interpreted as an abbreviation for Conrad von Soest. This signature and a lost but documented signature on the Wildungen retable make Conrad von Soest one of the first North German masters whose paintings can be attributed with certainty. (Note: The Wildungen signature is no longer legible today; according to a transcription by Ludwig Varnhagen it read "Conradum pictorem de Susato"; see Corley 2000, p. 199)

== Sources ==
- Appuhn, Horst (1981). "St. Marien in Dortmund". In Lorenz, Konrad (ed.). Die Evangelische Sankt Marienkirche zu Dortmund anläßlich des 800jährigen Bestehens. Dortmund: Ev. St.-Mariengemeinde. OCLC 1398204303.
- Corley, Brigitte (2000). Conrad von Soest: Maler unter fürstlichen Kaufherren. Berlin: Gebr. Mann. ISBN 9783786122937.
- Corley, Brigitte (2004). "Einige Bemerkungen zu Conrad von Soest und seiner Werkstatt". In Buberl, Brigitte (ed.). Conrad von Soest: neue Forschungen über den Maler und die Kulturgeschichte der Zeit um 1400. Dortmunder Mittelalter-Forschungen 1. Gütersloh: Verlag für Regionalgeschichte. ISBN 9783895345210.
- Engelbert, Arthur (1995). Conrad von Soest: ein Dortmunder Maler um 1400. Dortmund: Cramers Kunstanstalt. ISBN 9783924302221. (Alternative location and publisher: Cologne: W. König; ISBN 9783883752228.)
- Fritz, Rolf (1950). "Beobachtungen am Dortmunder Marienaltar Conrads von Soest". Westfalen. 28: 107–122.
- Germany: A Phaidon Cultural Guide. Englewood Cliffs, New Jersey: Prentice-Hall. 1985. ISBN 9780133541434.
- Rinke, Wolfgang (1991). Dortmunder Kirchen des Mittelalters, St. Reinoldi, St. Marien, St. Johannes Bapt. (Propstei), St. Petri (2nd ed.). Dortmund: Ruhfus. ISBN 9783793250326.
- Rinke, Wolfgang (2004). "Die Donation des Bürgermeisters Nies im Jahre 1720, zur Geschichte des Hochaltar-Retabels in St. Marien zu Dortmund im 18. Jahrhundert". In Buberl, Brigitte (ed.). Conrad von Soest: neue Forschungen über den Maler und die Kulturgeschichte der Zeit um 1400. Dortmunder Mittelalter-Forschungen 1. Gütersloh: Verlag für Regionalgeschichte. ISBN 9783895345210.
- Storck, Hans-Walter (2004). "Realienkundliches auf den Tafelbildern des Conrad von Soest, oder: was auf den Bildern zu lesen ist". In Buberl, Brigitte (ed.). Conrad von Soest: neue Forschungen über den Maler und die Kulturgeschichte der Zeit um 1400. Dortmunder Mittelalter-Forschungen 1. Gütersloh: Verlag für Regionalgeschichte. ISBN 9783895345210.
- Welzel, Barbara (2004). "Bilder – Kontexte – Identitäten. Die Marienbilder des Conrad von Soest im spätmittelalterlichen Dortmund". In Schilp, Thomas; Welzel, Barbara (eds.). Dortmund und Conrad von Soest im spätmittelalterlichen Europa. Bielefeld: Verlag für Regionalgeschichte. ISBN 9783895345333.
- Zupancic, Andrea (2002). "Der Berswordt-Meister und die Kunst seiner Zeit". In Zupancic, Andrea; Schilp, Thomas (eds.). Der Berswordt-Meister und die Dortmunder Malerei um 1400: Stadtkultur im Spätmittelalter. Bielefeld: Verlag für Regionalgeschichte. ISBN 9783895344886.
