= St. Johannes Evangelist =

Catholic church in Selm, Germany

Coordinates: 51°39′03″N 7°32′21″E

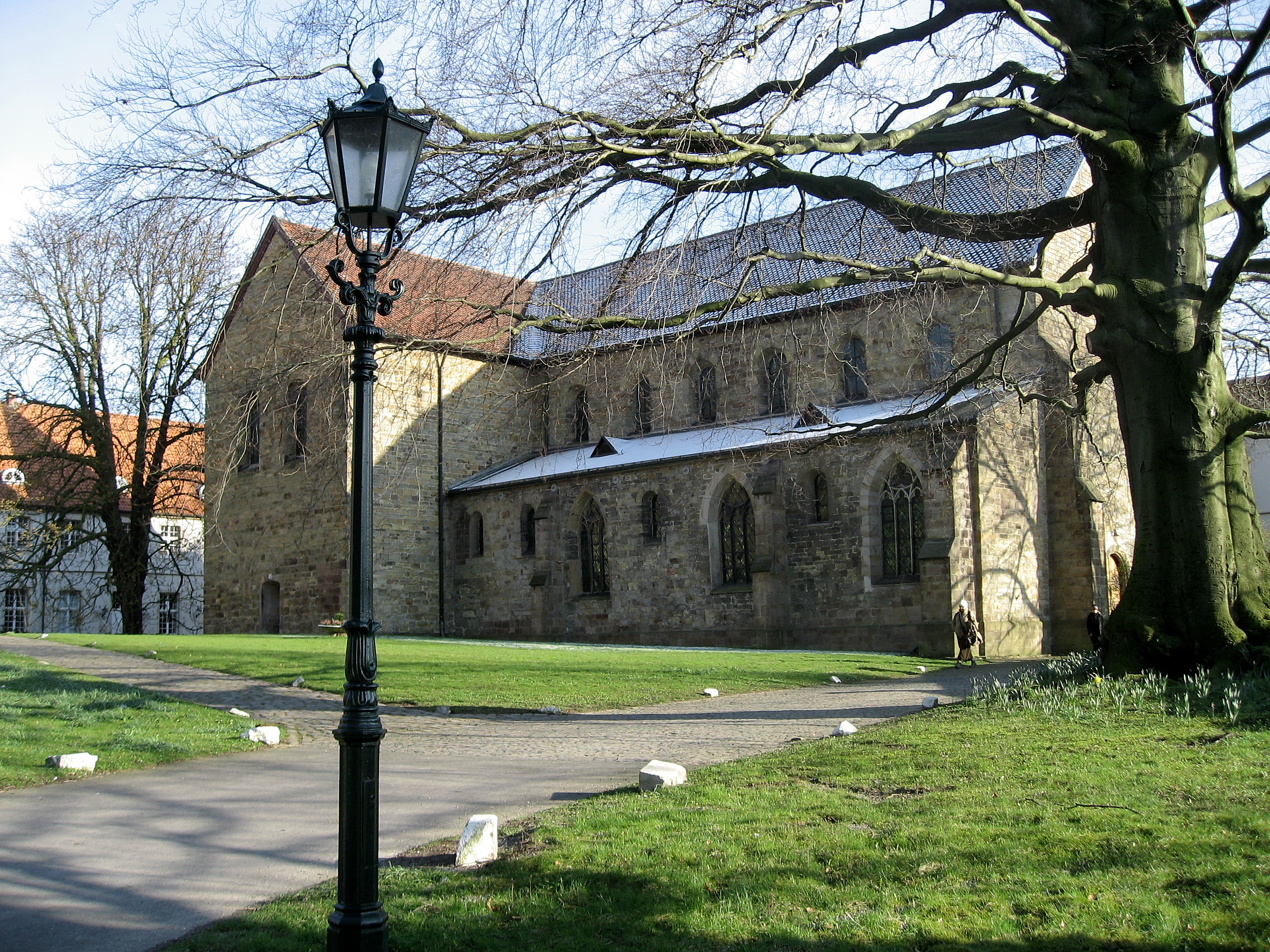
- Exterior

Religion
- Affiliation: Catholic
- Province: Diocese of Münster
- Ecclesiastical or organizational status: Parish church

Location
- Location: Cappenberg, North Rhine-Westphalia, Germany
- Interactive map of St. Johannes Evangelist

Architecture
- Type: Basilica
- Style: Romanesque style
- Completed: 12th century

St. Johannes Evangelist is a Catholic parish church in Cappenberg, now part of Selm, North Rhine-Westphalia, Germany. It was formerly the abbey church (Stiftskirche Cappenberg) of Cappenberg Abbey built in Romanesque style. It is a listed monument as one of few extant large churches built before the mid-12th century in Westphalia.

The church holds the Cappenberger Barbarossakopf, a reliquary regarded as a medieval portrait bust of the emperor Friedrich Barbarossa.

== History ==
The church was built in the 12th century, dedicated to John the Evangelist, as the abbey church of Cappenberg Abbey, founded in 1122. The abbey was founded by the brothers Otto and Gottfried von Cappenberg as the first residence of the Premonstratensians, founded in 1120. The building was expanded by a polygonal apse in Gothic style.

When the monasteries were dissolved in 1802, the church and abbey buildings deteriorated. The church was reconstructed by Freiherr vom Stein. Another restoration took place in 1971.

The church, now a parish church, is a listed monument, and together with St. Bonifatius in Freckenhorst is one of two large churches built in Westphalia before the mid-12th century and mostly preserved in that style.

== Architecture ==
As described by German architectural historian Albert Ludorff, the former abbey church is a mostly 12th-century Romanesque building. The church has a standard cruciform basilica plan, with a nave of three aisles and three bays ending in a transept and a two-bay choir. Gothic vaulting and window tracery were added to the church, but especially the choir, in the 14th and 15th centuries. Several pieces of the church, most notably the cloister and the side chapels, were removed during the Baroque remodeling of the abbey, which surrounds the church on three sides.

=== Interior ===
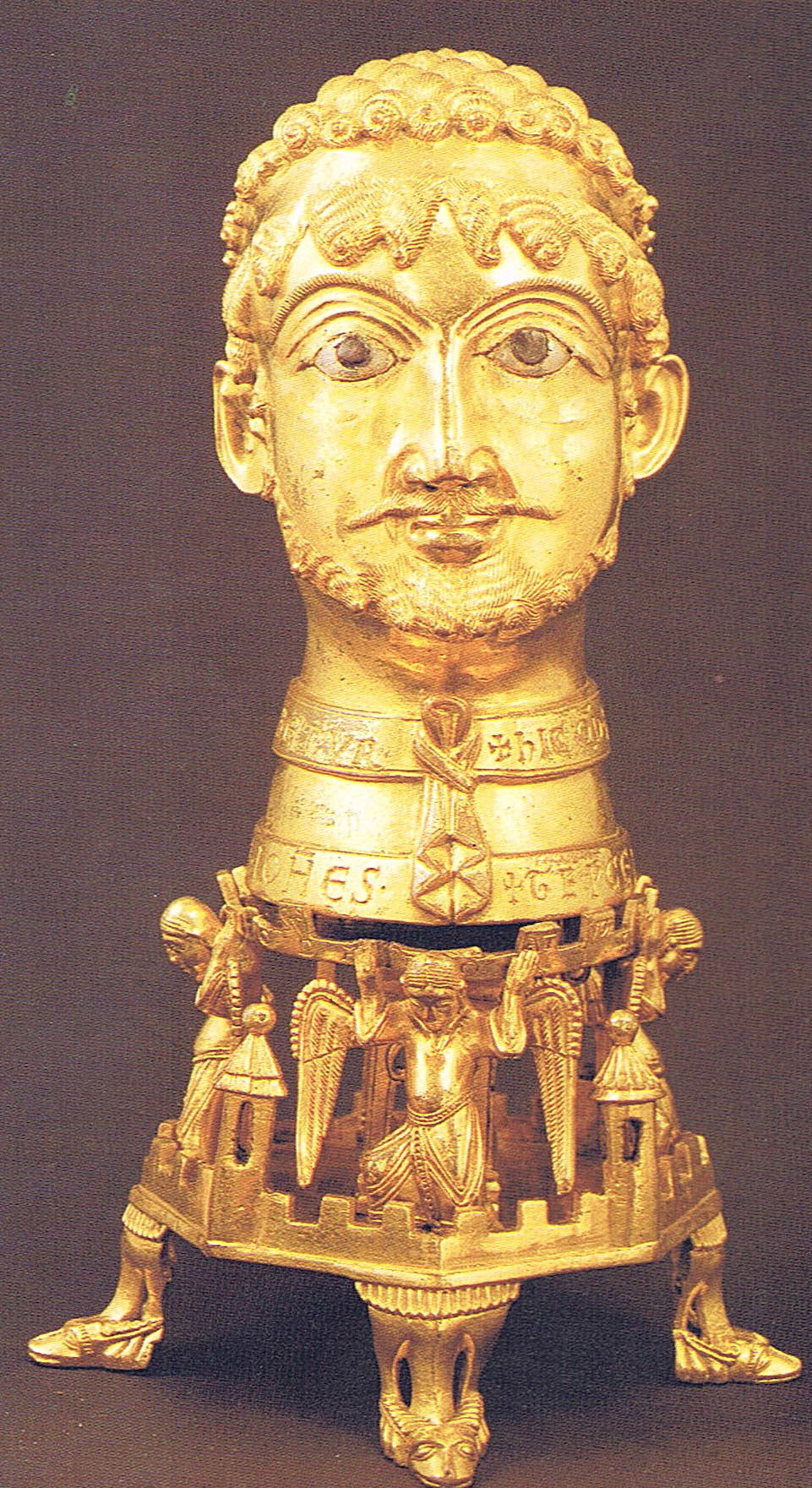
Head reliquary

Medieval painting was discovered when the church was restored in 1971, and was partly restored.

The church features a head reliquary, called Cappenberger Barbarossakopf. The gilded bronze was made after 1155, possibly in Aachen. It is mentioned in a document of the Aachen Cathedral as a donation by Friedrich Barbarossa to his Godfather Otto of Cappenberg, together with a silver bowl, the so-called Taufschüssel (baptism bowl) of Barbarossa. The recipient donated both treasures to the abbey. The artwork is believed to be a portrait bust of the emperor, but is probably rather an ideal image of an emperor, based on classical models.
