= 1914 in architecture =

The year 1914 in architecture involved some significant events.

== Events ==
- April 11 – Alpha Rho Chi, a professional architecture fraternity, is founded in the Hotel Sherman in Chicago, Illinois, United States.
- May 15–August 8 – Werkbund Exhibition in Cologne, featuring the Glass Pavilion designed by Bruno Taut.
- August 15 – A dismissed servant kills seven people at American architect Frank Lloyd Wright's studio and home, Taliesin in Wisconsin (including Wright's mistress, Mamah Borthwick), and sets it on fire.
- Lucy Greenish is the first woman to become a registered architect in New Zealand.

== Buildings and structures ==
=== Buildings and structures opened ===
- January 14 – "Bridge of Sighs" at Hertford College, Oxford, England, designed by Sir Thomas Jackson.
- April – Opera House, Wellington, New Zealand, designed by William Pitt.
- May 7 – King Edward VII Galleries at the British Museum, London, designed by Sir John Burnet.
- June 1 – Fairmont Palliser Hotel in Calgary, Alberta
- August 15 – The Panama Canal, completed by George Washington Goethals.
- November 14 – The Joensuu Town Hall, designed by Eliel Saarinen, is inaugurated in Joensuu, Finland.
- December 7 – Tepid Baths, Auckland, New Zealand.

=== Buildings completed ===
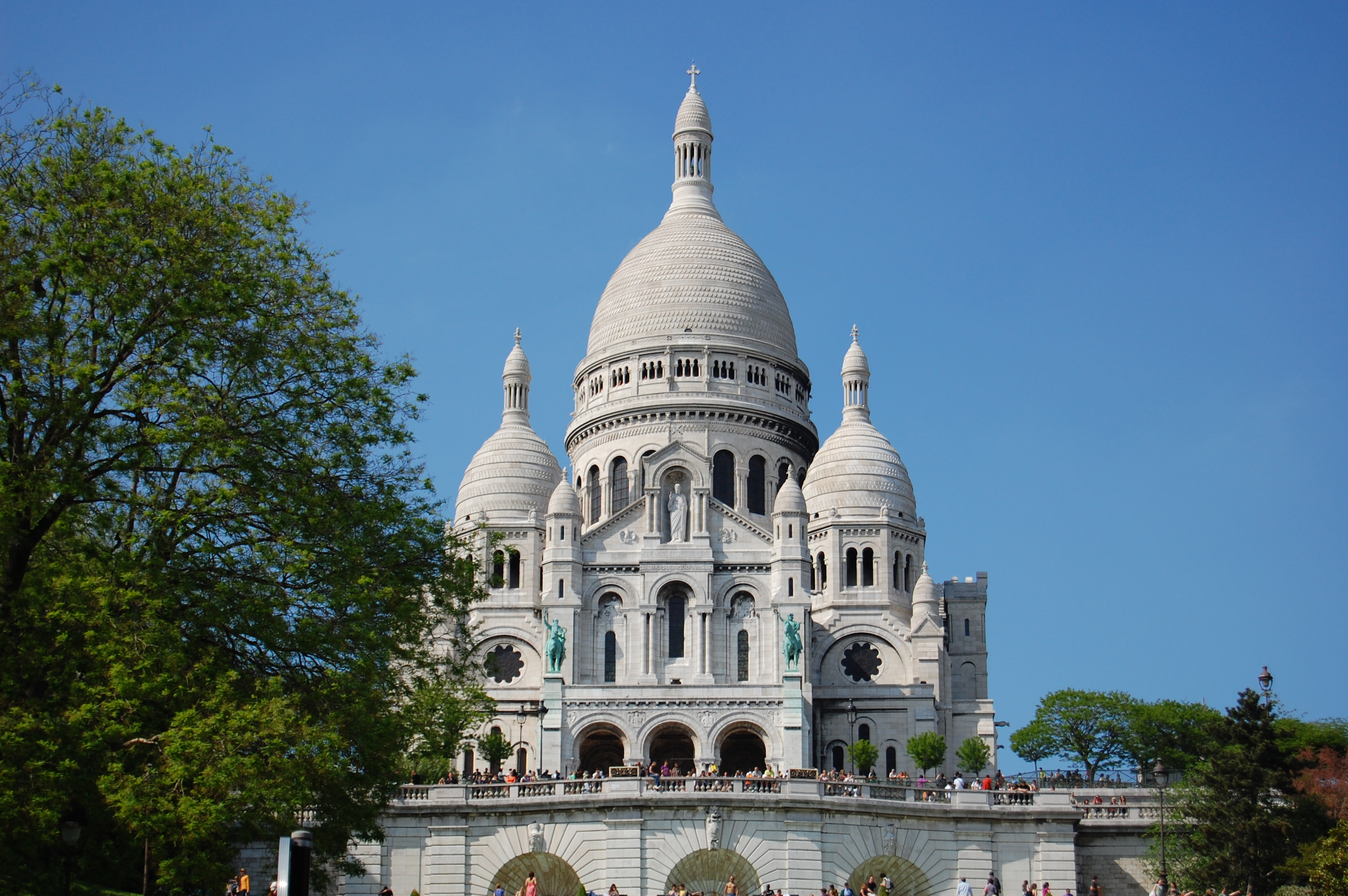
Basilica of Sacré-Cœur, Paris, France

- Basilica of Sacré-Cœur, Paris, designed by Paul Abadie.
- Berlin State Library, Berlin, designed by Ernst von Ihne
- Casa Loma, Toronto, Ontario, Canada.
- Park Guell in Barcelona, Spain, designed by Antonio Gaudi.
- Stralsund Theatre, Germany, designed by Carl Moritz.
- Interior of Cadena Café, 59 Westbourne Grove, London, designed by Omega Workshops.
- US Post Office, Westerly, Rhode Island, designed by James Knox Taylor and considered "the finest post office in the state."

== Awards ==
- AIA Gold Medal – Jean-Louis Pascal.
- RIBA Royal Gold Medal – Jean-Louis Pascal.
- Grand Prix de Rome, architecture: Albert Ferran.

== Publications ==
- Albert Richardson – Monumental Classic Architecture in Great Britain and Ireland
- Geoffrey Scott – The Architecture of Humanism: a study in the history of taste

== Births ==
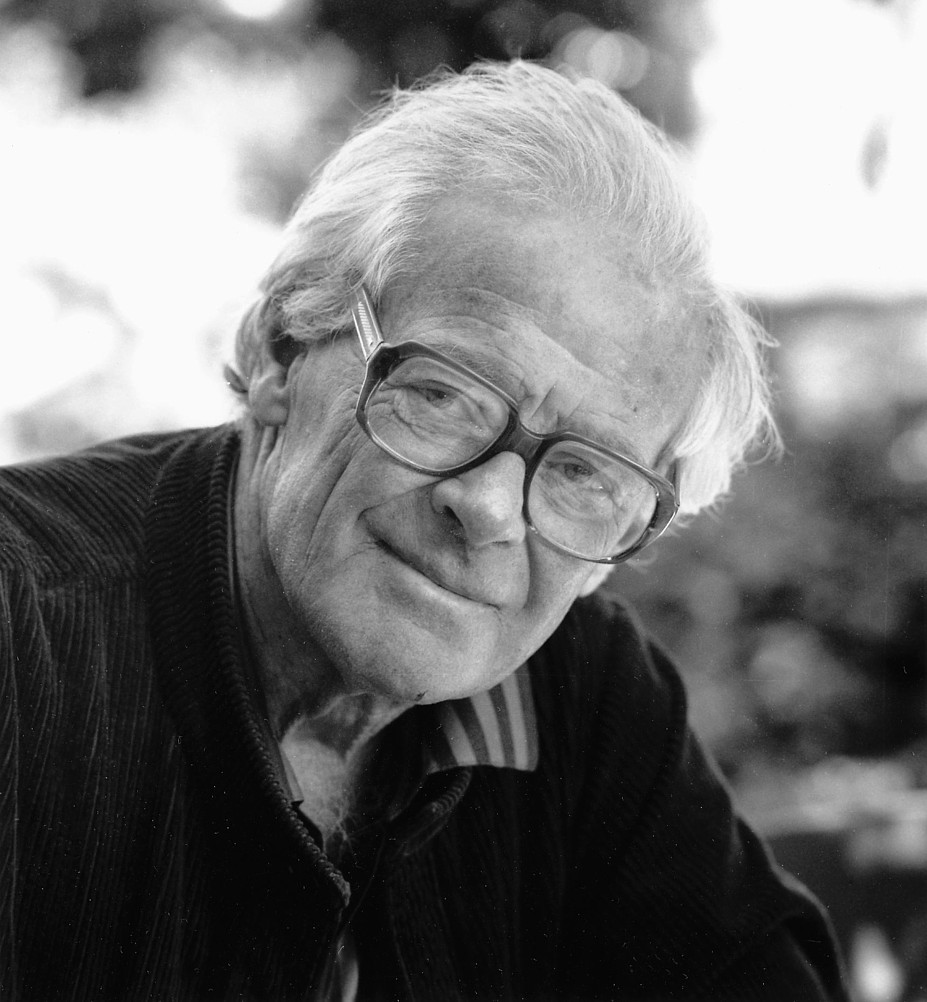
Ralph Erskine

- February 24 – Ralph Erskine, English architect working in Sweden (died 2005)
- July 8 – Sarah P. Harkness, American architect (died 2013)
- August 9 – Gordon Cullen, influential English architect and urban designer (died 1994)
- September 8 – Denys Lasdun, English architect best known for the Royal National Theatre, London (died 2001)
- September 13 – Ralph Rapson, American architect and head of architecture at the University of Minnesota (died 2008)
- October 31 – Edward Allcard, British architect and yachtsman (died 2017)
- December 5 – Lina Bo Bardi, Italian-born Brazilian modernist architect (died 1992)

== Deaths ==
- February 8 – Francesc Berenguer i Mestres, Spanish architect (born 1866)
- May 24 – Herman Teodor Holmgren, Swedish architect (born 1842)
- August 30 – Ingress Bell, English architect and professional partner of Sir Aston Webb (born 1837)
