= Joachim Meyerhoff =

German actor, director, and writer (born 1967)

Joachim Philipp Maria Meyerhoff
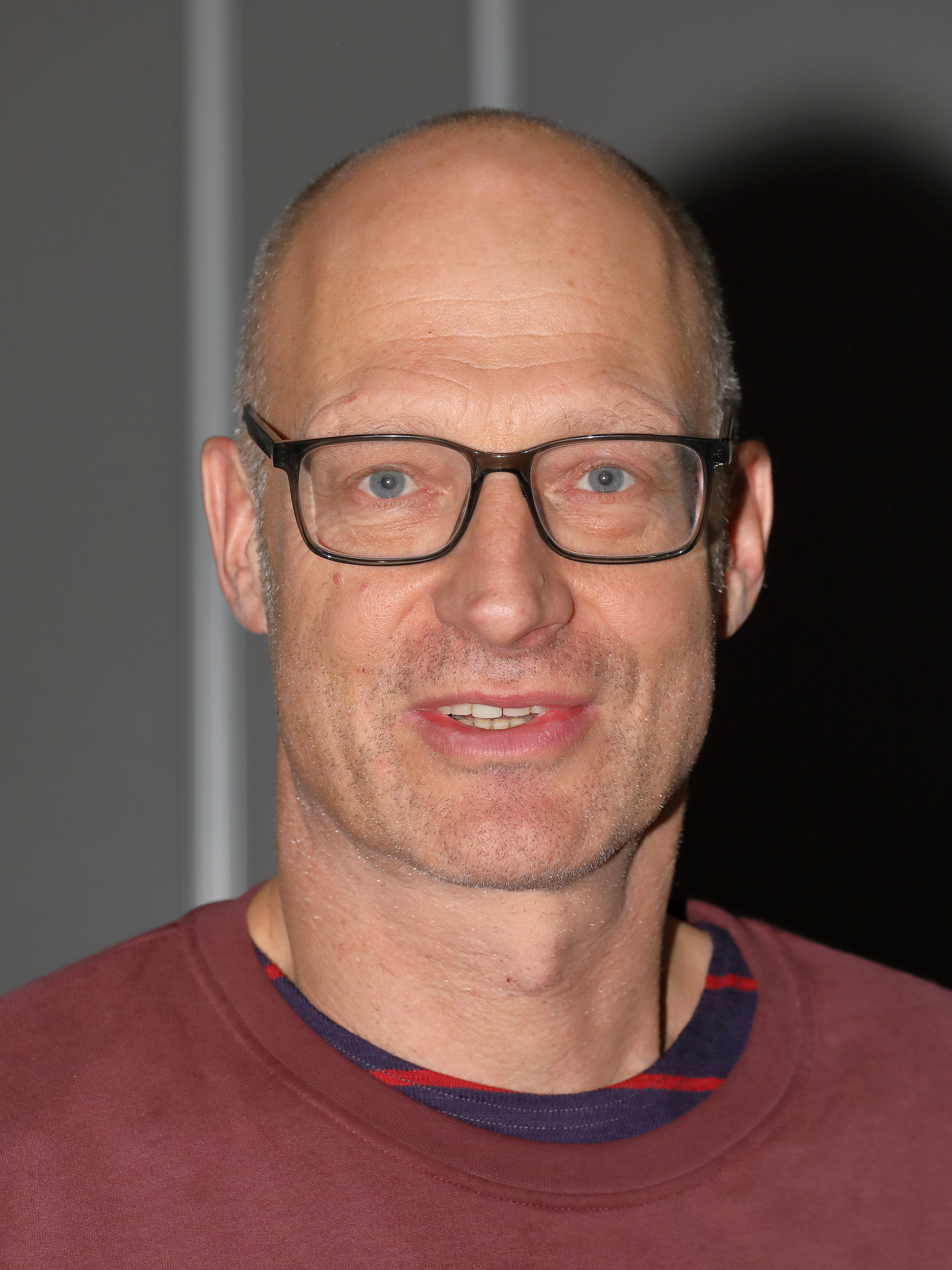
- Joachim Meyerhoff in 2024
- Born: 1967 (age 58–59); Homburg
- Occupations: Actor, director, writer

Joachim Philipp Maria Meyerhoff (born 1967 in Homburg) is a German actor, director, and writer.

== Life ==
Joachim Meyerhoff is the youngest son of Hermann Meyerhoff, who was the director of the psychiatric clinic in Hesterberg, Schleswig-Holstein, from 1972. The director's house was on the grounds of the clinic. Joachim spent his childhood with two older brothers on the clinic grounds in Schleswig-Holstein. At 17, he spent a year in Laramie, Wyoming. During this time, his middle brother was killed in an automobile accident. After his return, Joachim Meyerhoff completed his high school studies (Abitur) and would have performed his compulsory community service as a swimming-pool supervisor at the Rechts der Isar Hospital in Munich. Instead, he completed his training as an actor between 1989 and 1992 at the Otto Falckenberg School of the Performing Arts in Munich. After commitments at the Staatstheater Kassel, in Bielefeld, Dortmund and the Bühnen der Stadt Köln, he joined the Maxim Gorki Theater, Berlin in 2001, where he also frequently directed. In 2002, he moved to the Deutsche Schauspielhaus in Hamburg, where he stayed until 2005. He acted there in productions by Volker Hesse, Thomas Langhoff, Stefan Otteni, Karin Beier, Sebastian Hartmann and Günter Krämer. Since September 2005, Joachim Meyerhoff has been an ensemble member of the Burgtheater in Vienna. At the beginning of the 2013 season, he returned to the Deutsche Schauspielhaus under the leadership of artistic director Karin Beier. However, he remains a member of the Viennese Burgtheater.

In addition to his work as an actor, Meyerhoff has frequently conceived his own programs. His project Alle Toten fliegen hoch regularly played at the Burgtheater Vienna to a full audience. In this autobiographical, six-part program, Meyerhoff tells the story of his life and family. He tells of his siblings, his grandparents in Munich, his father, the director of a child and youth psychiatric clinic in Schleswig, his upbringing on the grounds on the institution, and his exchange year in America. He was invited to perform the first three parts of the series at the Berliner Theatertreffen 2009. In 2011, the first part (Amerika) was published as a book by Kiepenheuer & Witsch.

In 2006 and 2007, Meyerhoff was nominated for the Nestroy-Preis. He was chosen as Actor of the Year in 2007 for playing the role of Hamlet at the Schauspielhaus Zürich and the role of Benedict in Jan Bosse's production of Shakespeare's Much Ado about Nothing. He received the 2011 Franz-Tumler-Literaturpreis and the 2012 advancement award of the Bremer Literaturpreis for his novel Alle Toten fliegen hoch. Amerika. In 2014, he was recognized for his work in the role of Arnolphe in The School for Wives (Schauspielhaus Hamburg, producer: Herbert Fritsch) with the Rolf-Mares-Preis. In 2015, his interpretation of Kreon in Jette Steckel's production of Antigone at the Burgtheater was praised by the public and press.

Meyerhoff is the grandson of the actor Inge Birkmann, whose second marriage was to the philosopher Hermann Krings. Meyerhoff has two daughters by Christiane von Poelnitz, who is an actor at the Burgtheater.

In 2017 Meyerhoff suffered a stroke.

== Roles in theater ==
Deutsches Schauspielhaus Hamburg

- 2002: Hedda Gabler by Henrik Ibsen, director: Sandra Strunz
- 2003: As You Like It by William Shakespeare, director: Jürgen Gosch
- 2002: Vorher/Nachher by Roland Schimmelpfennig, director: Jürgen Gosch
- 2004: Waiting for Godot by Samuel Beckett, director: Jan Bosse
- 2004: The Broken Jug by Heinrich von Kleist, director: Jürgen Gosch
- 2004: Mephisto in Faust, Part I by Johann Wolfgang Goethe, director: Jan Bosse

Schauspielhaus Zürich

- 2007: Hamlet by William Shakespeare, role: Hamlet, director: Jan Bosse

Burgtheater Vienna

- 2005: Wir wollen den Messias jetzt oder Die beschleunigte Familie by Franzobel, role: Jesus, Regie: Karin Beier
- 2005: Philistines by Maxim Gorky, role: Tetrew, director: Karin Beier
- 2006: Torquato Tasso by Johann Wolfgang von Goethe, role: Alfons II, Duke of Ferrara, director: Stephan Kimmig
- 2006: Much Ado About Nothing by William Shakespeare, role: Benedikt, director: Jan Bosse, Salzburger Festspiele
- 2006: Höllenangst by Johann Nestroy, role: Thuming, director: Martin Kušej (coproduction with the Salzburger Festspielen)
- 2007: The Tempest by William Shakespeare, role: Ariel, director: Barbara Frey
- 2007: The Brothers Karamazov by Fyodor Dostoyevsky, role: Iwan, director: Nicolas Stemann
- 2008: God of Carnage by Yasmina Reza, role: Alain Reille, director: Dieter Giesing
- 2008: Who's Afraid of Virginia Woolf? by Edward Albee, role: George, director: Jan Bosse
- 2009: Mea Culpa – Eine ReadyMadeOper by Christoph Schlingensief, director: Christoph Schlingensief
- 2009: Faust I in place of the injured Gert Voss, director: Matthias Hartmann
- 2009: Faust II, director: Matthias Hartmann
- 2010: Othello by William Shakespeare, role: Othello, director: Jan Bosse
- 2010: Twelfth Night by William Shakespeare, role: Malvolio, director: Matthias Hartmann
- 2011: Professor Bernhardi by Arthur Schnitzler, role: Prof. Bernhardi, director: Dieter Giesing
- 2011: The Commune, by Mogens Rukov, Thomas Vinterberg role: Erik, director: Thomas Vinterberg
- 2012: Robinson Crusoe, role: Robinson Crusoe, director: Jan Bosse
- 2012: Der Ignorant und der Wahnsinnige by Thomas Bernhard, role: Doktor
- 2013: Tartuffe by Molière, role: Tartuffe, producer: Luc Bondy
- 2014: Dantons Tod by Georg Büchner, role: Danton, director: Jan Bosse
- 2015: The Imaginary Invalid by Molière, role: Argan, director: Herbert Fritsch
- 2016: Bella Figura by Yasmina Reza, role: Boris, director: Dieter Giesing
- 2017: Die Welt im Rücken by Thomas Melle, director: Jan Bosse

== As director ==
- 2001: Venedikt Yerofeyev's Moskau – Petuschki
- 2003: Erich Kästner's Fabian
- 2005: Wann wird es endlich wieder so, wie es nie war?
- 2006: Marathon: 2:04:55
- 2007–2009: Alle Toten fliegen hoch (parts 1–3 were invited to the Berliner Theatertreffen 2009)
  - 2007: Alle Toten fliegen hoch, Teil 1: Amerika
  - 2008: Alle Toten fliegen hoch, Teil 2: Zuhause in der Psychiatrie
  - 2008: Alle Toten fliegen hoch, Teil 3: Die Beine meiner Großmutter
  - 2008: Alle Toten fliegen hoch, Teil 4: Theorie und Praxis
  - 2009: Alle Toten fliegen hoch, Teil 5: Heute wärst Du zwölf
  - 2009: Alle Toten fliegen hoch, Teil 6: Ach diese Lücke, diese entsetzliche Lücke

== Roles on film ==
- 2005: Tatort – Stille Tage, director: Thomas Jauch
- 2005: Doppelter Einsatz – Seitensprung in den Tod, director: Peter Patzak
- 2011: Woman in Love, as American Director
- 2017: Bibi & Tina: Perfect Pandemonium, director: Detlev Buck

== Literary works ==
- Amerika. (Alle Toten fliegen hoch. No. 1), Cologne 2011, ISBN 978-3-462-04292-4
- Wann wird es endlich wieder so, wie es nie war. (Alle Toten fliegen hoch. No. 2), Cologne 2013, ISBN 978-3-462-04516-1
- Ach, diese Lücke, diese entsetzliche Lücke. (Alle Toten fliegen hoch. No. 3), Cologne 2015, ISBN 978-3-462-04828-5
- Die Zweisamkeit der Einzelgänger. (Alle Toten fliegen hoch. No. 4), Cologne 2017, ISBN 978-3-462-04944-2
- Hamster im hinteren Stromgebiet. (Alle Toten fliegen hoch. No. 5), Cologne 2020, ISBN 978-3-462-00024-5
- Man kann auch in die Höhe fallen . (Alle Toten fliegen hoch. No. 6). Cologne 2024, ISBN 978-3-462-00699-5

== Prizes ==
- 2006: Nestroy Theatre Prize – Nominated – Best Actor for Schauspielerische Gesamtleistung in der Saison 2005/06
- 2007: Nestroy Theatre Prize – Nominated – Best Actor for Benedict in Much Ado About Nothing
- 2007: Schauspieler des Jahres – Critic's Prize from the trade journal Theater heute
- 2011: Nestroy Theatre Prize – Nominated – Best Actor for Professor Bernhardi in Professor Bernhardi
- 2012: Nestroy Theatre Prize – Best Actor for Erek in The Commune
- 2012: Advancement Prize of the Bremer Literaturpreis for his novel Alle Toten fliegen hoch. Amerika
- 2014: Rolf-Mares-Preis – Outstanding service as actor in The School of Wives, Schauspielhaus Hamburg
- 2016: Nicolas Born Prize (Inaugural prize)
- 2016: Euregio-Schüler-Literaturpreis for Wann wird es endlich wieder so, wie es nie war
- 2017: Carl Zuckmayer Medal.
- 2017: Deutscher Hörbuchpreis in the category "Best Discussion" for his reading Ach, diese Lücke, diese entsetzliche Lücke.
- 2017: Election to the Academy of Arts, Berlin
- 2017: Schauspieler des Jahres
- 2019: Gustaf Gründgens Prize
