= Schauspiel Köln =

Municipal drama theatre in Cologne, Germany

- Cologne Schauspielhaus, following the completion of its renovation in 2026
- Interactive map of Schauspiel Köln
- Address: Brüderstraße 4, Cologne, North Rhine-Westphalia; Germany
- Coordinates: 50°56′14″N 6°57′02″E
- Capacity: more than 1,000

Construction
- Opened: 1898
- Years active: 1898–present
- Architect: Wilhelm Riphahn

Schauspiel Köln is a theatre and company in Cologne, North Rhine-Westphalia, Germany. It forms together with the Cologne Opera and other houses the Bühnen der Stadt Köln (Stages of the city of Cologne). The listed building has 830 seats in the Grand House, 120 in the locksmith and 60 in the refreshment room. In addition, the listed 'Halle Kalk' has 200 seats, it was used until closing in the summer of 2015 because of the danger of collapse. Since the 2013/14 season (September 2013) Depot 1 and Depot 2 have been used as interim venues during the extensive renovation of the Schauspielhaus on the site of the former Carlswerk in Schanzenstraße in Cologne-Mülheim.

Ernst Hardt was the intendant before he moved on to the Westdeutscher Rundfunk in 1927.

== History ==
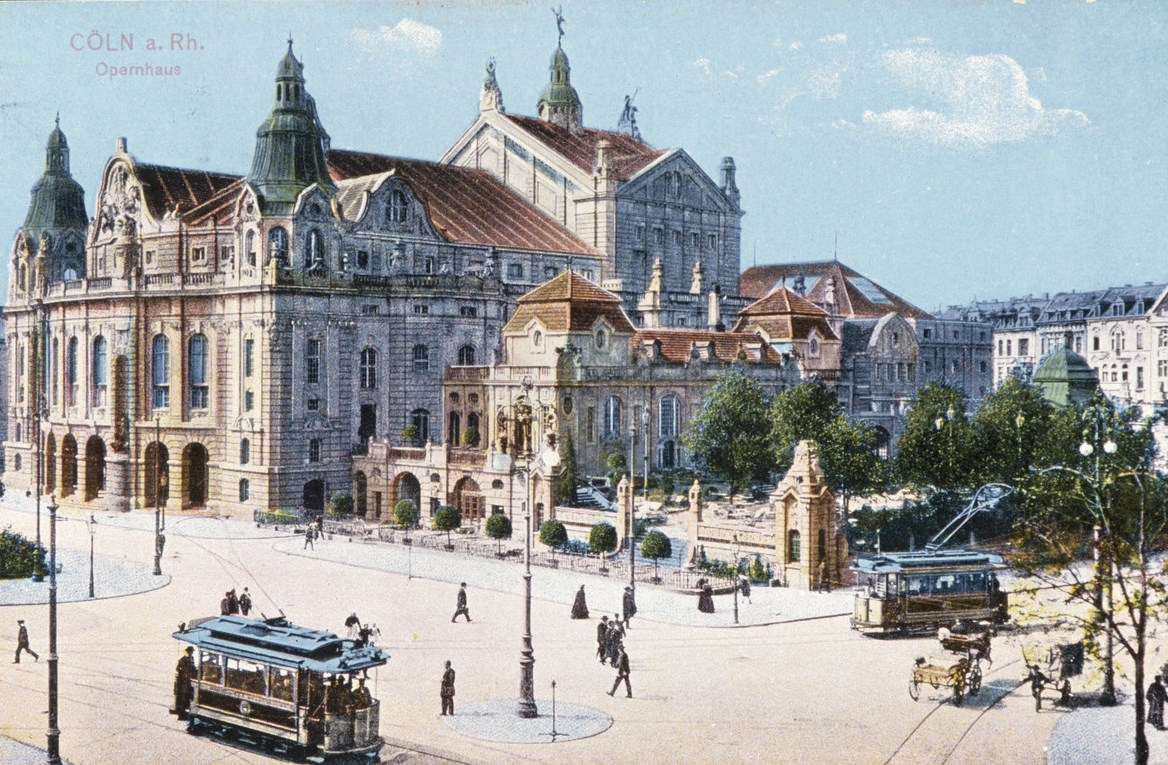
The old theatre building of architect Carl Moritz in 1910

The history of the Cologne theater begins in the Middle Ages. The first house was built in 1782, which was later called "Komödienstraße". A successor building from 1829 was destroyed in 1869 in a fire. In 1872, a new house was built in the Glockengasse (an historic street).

In May 1898, a new theatre building on Habsburgerring was built. Based on a design by architect Carl Moritz, a neo-baroque building with restaurant and garden terrace was built. The 1902 finished building had 1800 seats and eventually cost 3.9 million marks.

Cologne theater then had two large stages, which initially operated as "United City Theater", from the season 1906/07 as Opera House and Schauspielhaus, but were temporarily held together. In the new theater operas in particular, in the "old" house in the Glockengasse theater and operetta were performed. Both houses were run by Julius Hofmann, the then director of the Schauspielhaus.

== 1920 to 1945 ==
Acting director Gustav Hartung engaged well-known Berlin actors such as Heinrich George to the theatre in the 1920s, which made the house known nationwide. In 1929, Bertolt Brecht's Threepenny Opera was scheduled to be performed in the Schauspielhaus. However, the conservative Center Party tried to stop this. Konrad Adenauer, the mayor Cologne intervened and the play was performed.

At the time of the Nazi rule, the National Socialist opera director Alexander Spring was the general manager of the Kölner Bühnen and head of the Schauspielhaus. During the war, the two houses in the Glockengasse and the Habsburger Ring were destroyed or severely damaged. The theatre was heavily destroyed in a bombing raid in August 1943. In August 1945, the theater was able to give performances in replacement venues such as the auditorium of the university as the first theater in the British occupation zone again. In addition, a hall in the Rautenstrauch-Joest Museum in Ubierring was expanded to "Kammerspielen" and used until 1994 accordingly.

The 1902 theatre ruins were demolished in 1958.

== New building on the Offenbachplatz ==
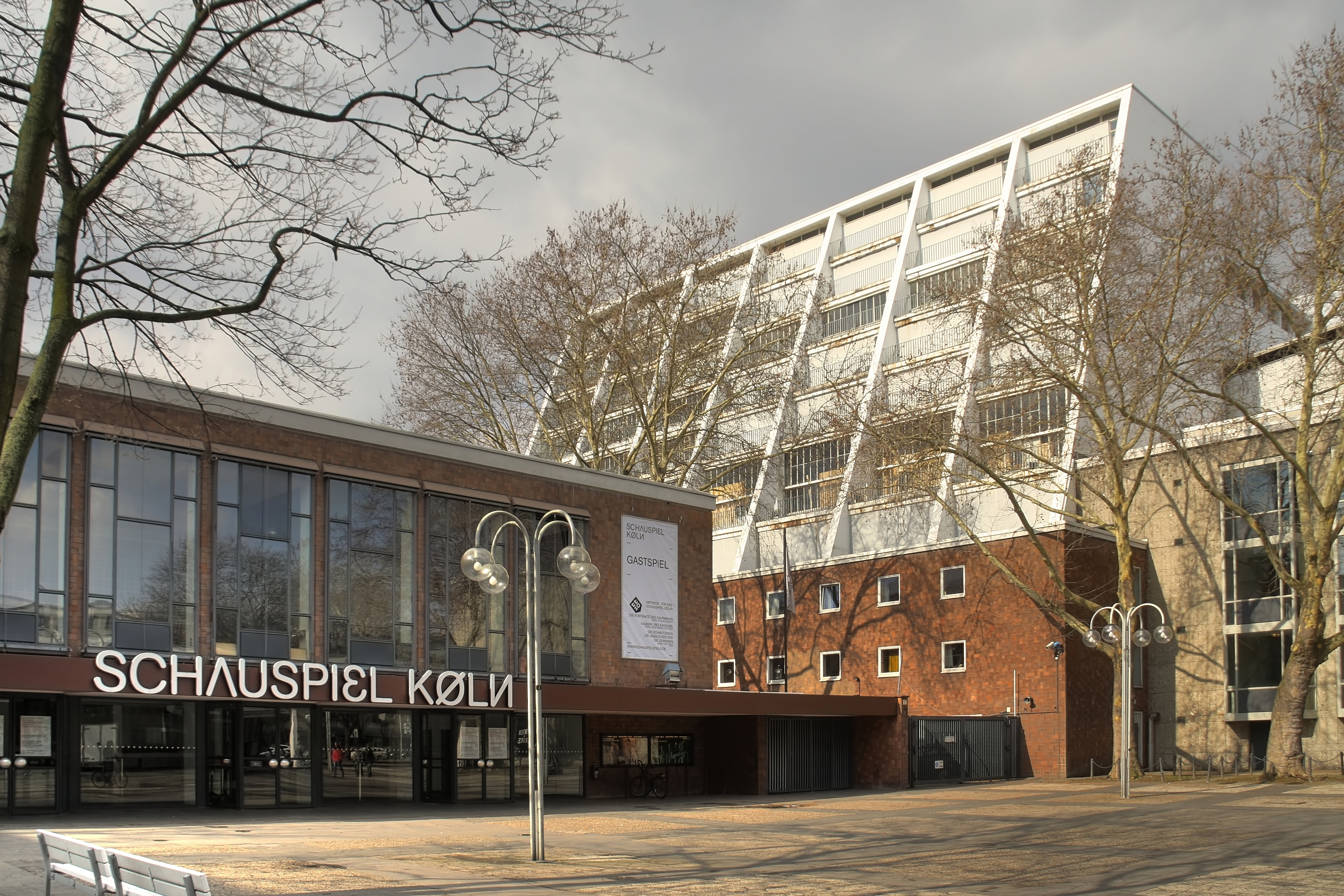

The new building opened on 14 October 1956, it opened with a gala performance of Paul Hindemith's opera Mathis der Maler.

In 1957, the stages moved from their makeshift venue in the auditorium to a newly built so-called multi-storey building on Offenbachplatz, where opera and operetta, ballet and drama were performed. In 1962, the new Schauspielhaus, designed by Wilhelm Riphahn, was completed and opened with Schiller's Die Räuber in the staging of the later director Oscar Fritz Schuh with actor Klausjürgen Wussow as Karl Moor. Federal President Heinrich Lübke also attended this performance.

In 1968, Hansgünther Heyme became the artistic director and dramaturge of the Schauspielhaus, which caused controversy with his unconventional implementations of plays. He also began a close collaboration with classical philologist Wolfgang Schadewaldt, whose translations of Greek dramas he brought to the stage in Cologne. Heyme was replaced in 1979 by Jürgen Flimm, and then in 1985 by Klaus Pierwoß. In 1989, Pierwoß was the first director, who brought the East German director Frank Castorf with a production of Hamlet to a West German theater. It was followed by the directors Torsten Fischer in 1990, Günter Krämer, Marc Günther and since 2007, Karin Beier. On 11 January 2013, Beier left before her move to the Deutsches Schauspielhaus, with her last production of an antique drama, The Trojan Women by Euripides. It was based on the work of Jean-Paul Sartre.

== Current theatre ==
As part of the opera renovation, the Schauspielhaus was again demolished and rebuilt between 2010 and 2013. Having withdrawn for reasons of cost of the new version so much that they hardly seemed to pay off, urged the citizens' initiative "Courage to culture. Contents in front of the facade "preserved the listed building and carried out a referendum, which was approved in April 2010 by the city council of Cologne. In June 2012, EXPO XXI was put into operation in the Agnesviertel on the Gladbacher Wall as an interim play stage during the renovation work. An information box, which was erected in October 2012, provided information about its building progress.

Rita Thiele has been chief dramatist and deputy director of the intendant and Patrick Wasserbauer is the managing director. Stefan Bachmann was appointed as Director of the House on 1 September 2013. Other current theatre directors include, Angela Richter, Rafael Sanchez and Moritz Sostmann.
