= Kolja Schallenberg =

German director and playwright (born 1984)

Kolja Schallenberg (born April 1984) is a German director and playwright.

== Career ==
Born in Hagen, Germany, Schallenberg studied classical singing at the musical school in Dortmund. He graduated in cultural and media management from Hochschule für Musik und Theater Hamburg. He studied Theatre Directing at Mountview Academy of Theatre Arts in London, led by Peter James. He also attended courses in adult education at Technische Universität Kaiserslautern and a masterclass in directing at the Shakespeare's Globe.

From 2002, Schallenberg has been involved in a number of theatrical productions across Germany as associate director: Konzertdirektion Landgraf, Stage Entertainment Germany, Musiktheater im Revier Gelsenkirchen and Thalia Theater Hamburg. During this period, he collaborated with Günter Grass, Hermann Schmidt-Rahmer, Euro Voices, Laith Al Deen and others.

In 2006, Schallenberg debuted as director with "the Show must go on" at Schauspielhaus Dortmund, followed by "Frühstück bei Goethe" at The Staatstheater, Nürnberg, "Alles muss raus" and "24 Stunden - LebensTräume" at Schauspielhaus Bochum.

For his work, Schallenberg was invited to festivals and awards: der Literaturwettbewerb Dortmund, das Fringe Festival Hamburg, K15-Festival and was nominated for best director at the IV. international directors festival.

In 2014, he took the role of artistic director and is co-responsible for productions on board of AIDA Cruises, the German arm of Carnival Cruises.

Since 2016, he is the artistic director of Transparence Theatre - Transgender on Stage.

== Theatre ==
=== As Director (Notable works) ===
- The Show must go on. Revue. 2006 (with texts by Udo Grashoff; world premiere Theater Dortmund)
- Ein Gespräch im Hause Stein über den abwesenden Herrn von Goethe. 2006 (by Peter Hacks; Theater Dortmund)
- Shark Kiss. 2007 (by Gerhard Meister; German premiere Theater Dortmund)
- Über die Schädlichkeit des Nikotins. 2007 (by Anton P. Tschechow; Theater Dortmund)
- Frühstück bei Goethe. Collage. 2008 (with original texts by Johann Wolfgang von Goethe; Staatstheater Nürnberg)
- Alles muss raus! Lyrik, Prosa, Szenen und Musik aus allen Epochen. 2008 (Staatstheater Nürnberg)
- 24 Stunden – Lebensträume. 2009 (world premiere Schauspielhaus Bochum; invited to K15-Festival)
- Die Bakchen. 2009 (by Euripides; Sprechwerk Hamburg; invited to IV. international Directorsfestival
- Der Menschenfeind. (by Molière; Monsuntheater Hamburg) 2009. Reopening in 2012.
- Stücke Schießen. New Writers. New Texts. New Plays. 2009–2011 (Theater Liga Hamburg/Kulturhaus III&70)
- Die Signatur des Pelikans. A Strindberg Project. 2010 (Theater Liga Hamburg/Fleetstreet)
- Meine tolle Scheidung. 2010 (by Geraldine Aron; Theater Liga Hamburg/Galeria Kaufhof Dortmund)
- Samsara - The Circle of Life. 2015 (by Timo Wuerz & Kolja Schallenberg; AIDA Cruises)
- Fernando Montano presents Hollywood Classics. 2017 (by Kolja Schallenberg & Fernando Montano; Hippodrome London)
- Mary Stuart - The Musical. 2017 (by Kolja Schallenberg, music by Paul Glaser; Karamel Klub)

=== As Writer (Notable works) ===
- Kolja Schallenberg (2002), Erzähler oder Konstruktive Kritik : Szenische Lesung (in German) – aufgeführt am Theater Dortmund
- Kolja Schallenberg; Udo Grashoff (2006), The Show must go on : Dramatische Revue (in German) – Uraufführung am Theater Dortmund
- Kolja Schallenberg (2009), 24 Stunden – Lebensträume (in German) – world premiere at Schauspielhaus Bochum; invited to K15-Festival
- Kolja Schallenberg (2009), Kundenbindung am Theater (in German) – Institut für Kultur- und Medienmanagement, Hochschule für Musik- und Theater Hamburg
- Kolja Schallenberg (2012), nwkm Hamburg (ed.), "tba", Und nun zu etwas völlig anderem (in German)
- Kolja Schallenberg; Timo Wuerz (2015), AIDA Cruises (ed.), Samsara - The Circle of Life – world premier on AIDAblu in July 2015

== Awards ==
- Special Award for best play at 7. Dortmunder Literaturwettbewerb (2002) for Erzähler oder Konstruktive Kritik
