= Volker Lechtenbrink =

German actor and singer (1944–2021)

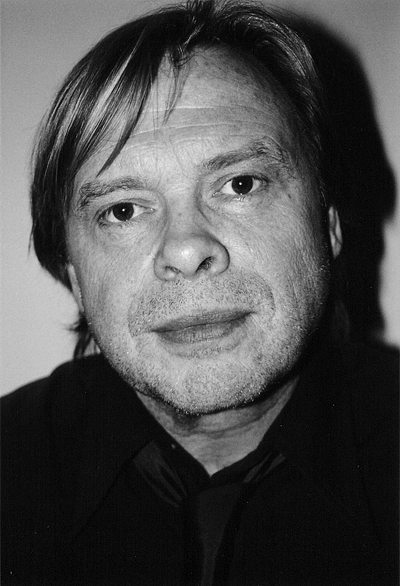
- Born: 18 August 1944; Cranz, East Prussia, Prussia, Nazi Germany (now Zelenogradsk, Russia)
- Died: 22 November 2021 (aged 77); Hamburg, Germany
- Occupations: Actor; singer-songwriter; dubbing artist; stage director; theatre manager
- Organizations: Ernst Deutsch Theater; Bad Hersfelder Festspiele
- Awards: Gustaf Gründgens Prize

Volker Lechtenbrink (18 August 1944 – 22 November 2021) was a German actor on stage, in film and television, a singer-songwriter, dubbing artist, stage director and theatre manager. He played in the anti-war movie The Bridge in 1959 at age 14. He appeared in popular television series including Der Kommissar, Der Alte and Tatort. Lechtenbrink was stage director at the Ernst Deutsch Theater in Hamburg, and intendant of the Bad Hersfelder Festspiele.

== Early life ==
Lechtenbrink was born in Cranz, East Prussia, Prussia, Germany (now Zelenogradsk, Russia), but grew up in Hamburg and Bremen where his family lived after World War II. He started his career at the age of 14 acting in the Oscar-nominated anti-war movie The Bridge (1959) by director Bernhard Wicki.

After leaving the Gelehrtenschule des Johanneums a year after completing his mittlere Reife, he was educated at the drama school of the Hochschule für bildende Künste Hamburg. He worked as an actor, later also stage director at the Ernst Deutsch Theater in Hamburg. Between 2004 and 2006, he was the theatre's intendant. From 1995 and 1997, he was also intendant of the Bad Hersfelder Festspiele.

== Career ==
Lechtenbrink acted in several German television productions during the last decades, including Der Kommissar, Derrick, Der Alte, Tatort, Ein Fall für zwei and some Rosamunde Pilcher films. In 2006, he played one of the central roles in the short-lived television series M.E.T.R.O. – Ein Team auf Leben und Tod.

He was the German dubbing voice of Burt Reynolds, Kris Kristofferson, Avery Brooks and Dennis Quaid. Besides his work as an actor he also started a very successful career as a singer and songwriter during the 1970s and 1980s, with songs like "Der Macher" and "Ich mag", some his own, others German versions of country rock ballads. He wrote the lyrics to the song "Rücksicht", performed by the duo Hoffmann & Hoffmann at the Eurovision Song Contest 1983, achieving 5th place in a field of 20.

== Personal life ==
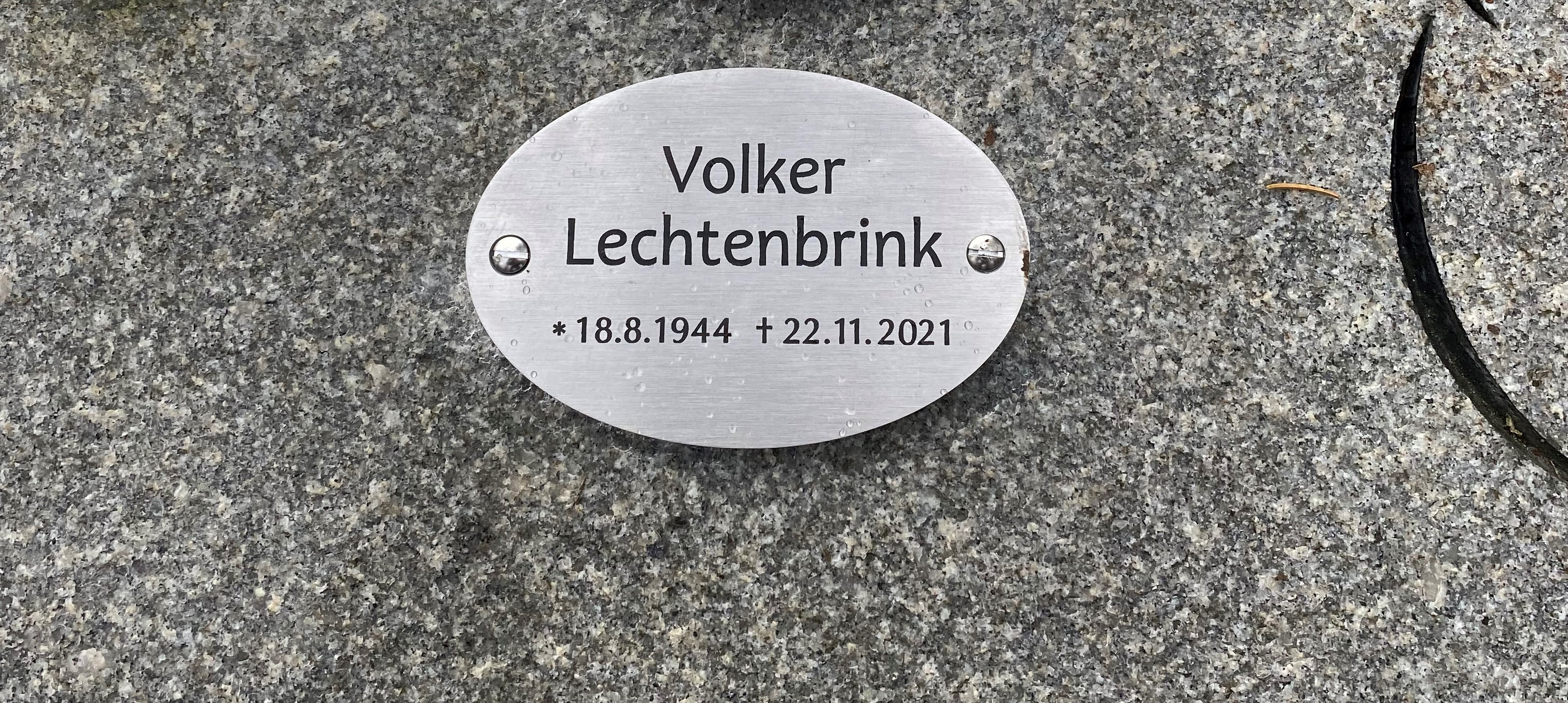
Grave of Volker Lechtenbrink, Friedhof Ohlsdorf (cemetery), Hamburg

Lechtenbrink was married five times, including the actresses Anja Topf and Jeanette Arndt, and had three children. He lived in Berlin and Hamburg. He died on 22 November 2021, aged 77.

== Awards ==
In 2010, Lechtenbrink was awarded the Rolf-Mares-Preis for a role in Frost/Nixon at the Hamburger Kammerspiele. In 2014, he was awarded the Biermann Ratjen Medal of the City of Hamburg. The city of Hamburg honoured his life achievements in 2021 by granting him the Gustaf Gründgens Prize. He passed the prize money of €15,000 to three charity organisations. He won the Hersfeld-Preis (Großer Hersfeld-Preis) in 1997.

== Albums ==
- 1976 Der Macher
- 1977 Volker Lechtenbrink Nr. 2
- 1977 Alltagsgeschichten
- 1978 Meine Tür steht immer offen
- 1978 Der Spieler
- 1980 Leben so wie ich es mag
- 1981 Schon möglich
- 1982 Wer spielt mit mir
- 1982 Ich mag
- 1983 Lebe heute
- 1984 Zurückgelehnt
- 1987 Ich kann gewinnen
- 1989 Herzschlag

== Filmography ==
Films and television and television series with Lechtenbrink include:

- Die Brücke (1959)
- Corinne und der Seebär (1966, TV film)
- Bratkartoffeln inbegriffen (1967, TV film)
- Der Kommissar: Das Ungeheuer (1969, TV series episode)
- Der Kommissar: Lagankes Verwandte (1971, TV series episode)
- Sonderdezernat K1: Kassensturz um Mitternacht (1973, TV series episode)
- Sonderdezernat K1: Flucht (1975, TV series episode)
- Sonderdezernat K1: MP-9mm frei Haus (1977, TV series episode)
- Die Dämonen (1977, TV miniseries)
- Iron Gustav (1979, TV miniseries)
- Sonderdezernat K1: Die Rache eines V-Mannes (1981, TV series episode)
- The Summer of the Samurai (1986)
- Derrick: Schonzeit für Mörder (1986, TV series episode)
- Ein Fall für zwei: Irgendwann (1987, TV series episode)
- Derrick: Ein Weg in die Freiheit (1987, TV series episode)
- Der Fahnder: Nordend (1988, TV series episode)
- Die Männer vom K3: Spiel über zwei Banden (1988, TV series episode)
- Derrick: Wie kriegen wir Bodetzki? (1989, TV series episode)
- Ein Fall für zwei: Gewissensbisse (1989, TV series episode)
- Der Hausgeist (1991–1993, TV series, 19 episodes)
- By Way of the Stars (1992, TV miniseries)
- Ein Fall für zwei: Rache (1993, TV series episode)
- When Santa Fell to Earth (2011)
