= Torsten Fischer =

Torsten Fischer (born 26 April 1958) is a German assistant director and theater intendant.

== Career ==
Born in Berlin, Fischer originally wanted to become a painter, but then studied biology and chemistry for a higher teaching position at the Free University of Berlin. From 1978 to 1981, he was a teacher and supervisor for drug addicts and foreign prisoners in the juvenile detention center of the Plötzensee Prison.

He frequently attended theatre rehearsals and was engaged in 1981 as assistant director and dramaturg for Günter Krämer and Hansgünter Heyme at the Staatstheater Stuttgart under director Hans Peter Doll. As a guest director he was assistant director and dramaturge at the Schiller Theater in Berlin in 1984, but as Krämer moved to the Theater Bremen in 1984, Fischer followed him there. In 1986, he led to differences between General Director Tobias Richter and Krämer, who succeeded in ensuring that Fischer could remain at the house as a permanent guest director.

When Krämer became artistic director of the Kölner Schauspiel in 1990, he was appointed senior director of the Bühnen der Stadt Köln. For his debut he staged a Tabori project with the farce Mein Kampf. Further productions in Cologne were Die Räuber (1991), Kroetz’ Bauerntheater (1991), Hebbel's Maria Magdalena (1992), Shakespeare's Twelfth Night (1993) and Jean Racine's Phèdre (1993). He supported the playwright Marlene Streeruwitz and staged the premieres of several of her plays. As a guest director, Fischer was especially active in Vienna at several theaters there.

From 1995 to 2003 he held the position of acting director in Cologne. Other productions there included Ferenc Molnár's Liliom (1996), the world premiere of Wilfried Happel's Mordslust (1996), the world premiere of Tankred Dorst's Die Geschichte der Pfeile (1996) and Eugene O’Neills Long Day's Journey into Night (1998).

== Awards ==
In 1988 and 2005 Fischer received the Karl-Skraup-Prize of the City of Vienna. At the NRW-Theatertreffen he was awarded the production prize for the best director (Mein Kampf / Kannibalen) in 1991 and the recording prize for Marlene Streeruwitz’ Waikiki-Beach. In 2013, Fischer was awarded the Austrian Music Theatre Prize Golden Schikaneder named best director of the year 2012 for Telemaco, a contemporary rendition of Gluck's Opera Telemacco, ossia L’isola di Circè at the Theater an der Wien.

== Bibliography ==
- Curt Bernd Sucher: Theaterlexikon. Autoren, Regisseure, Schauspieler, Dramaturgen, Bühnenbildner, Kritiker. Von Christine Dössel und Marietta Piekenbrock unter Mitwirkung von Jean-Claude Kuner und C. Bernd Sucher. Deutscher Taschenbuch-Verlag, München 2nd edition, 1999 ISBN 3-423-03322-3.
