= Angela Richter =

German-Croatian theatre director and author

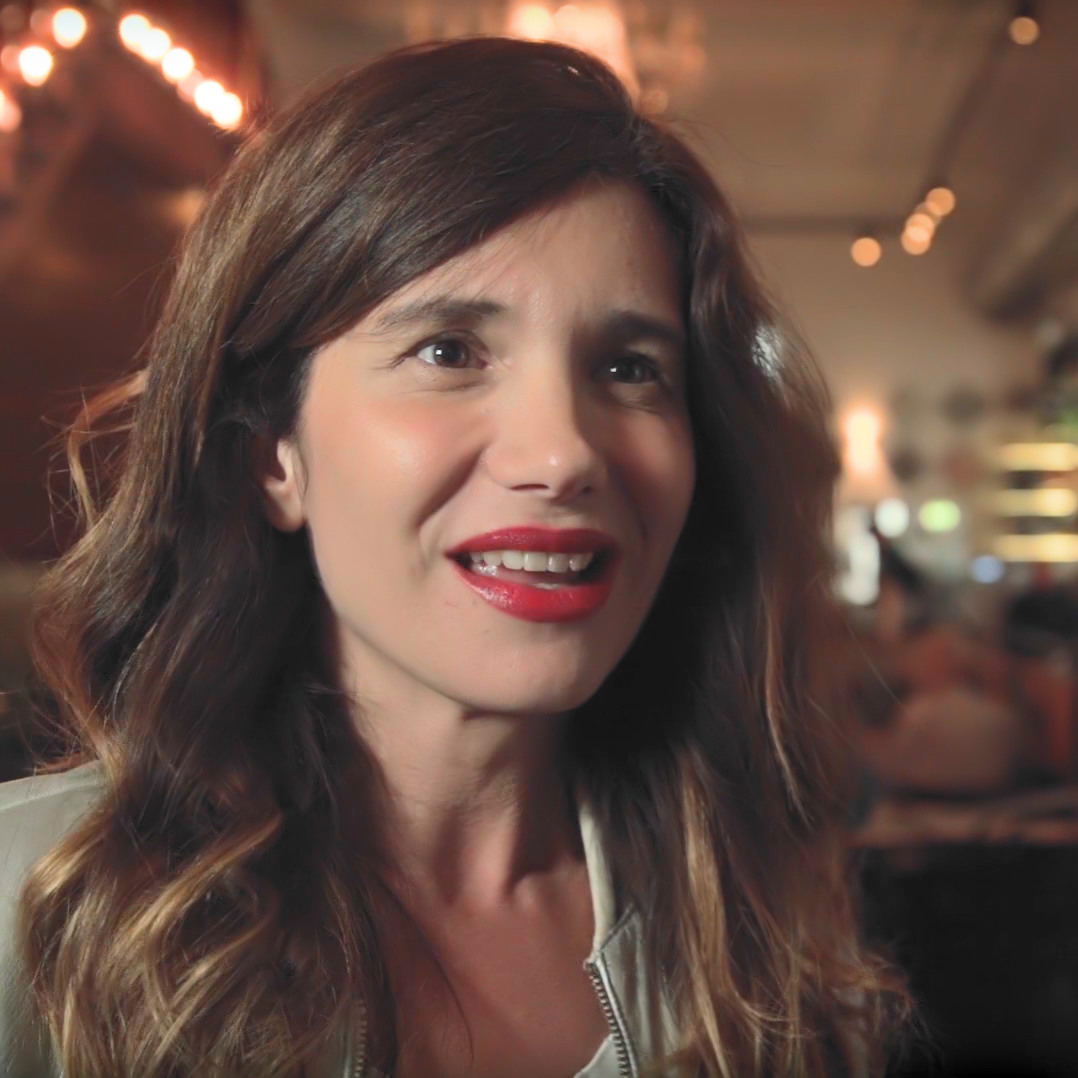
- Richter in 2016
- Born: Angela Asanović; 1970 (age 55–56); Ravensburg, Germany
- Known for: Theatre director and author
- Spouse: Daniel Richter (divorced)
- Partner: Malte Sundermann

Angela Richter (born 1970 in Ravensburg) is a German-Croatian theatre director and author.

== Life and work ==
From 1996 to 2001 Richter was a member of the Hamburg art group Akademie Isotrop with the artists Jonathan Meese, Abel Auer, Roberto Ohrt, Helena Huneke, Birgit Megerle and Andre Butzer. At the same time Richter studied directing with Jürgen Flimm at the Hochschule für Musik und Theater Hamburg, graduating in 2001. Her work – which encompasses aspects of fine art, theatre, and performance – has been described in the German-language press as gonzo-theater, with reference to the work of Hunter S. Thompson.

In 2006 she founded the Fleetstreet theatre in Hamburg, which she ran until 2010. From 2013 to 2016 she was one of the four house directors at the Cologne National Theatre Schauspiel Köln. She received the 2009 Rolf Mares Theatre Award for her staging of Der Fall Esra, based on the legal case that resulted in the ban on the author Maxim Biller's novel Esra.

Richter's staging of Antigone, the first play by Slavoj Žižek, is set to premiere in September 2019 at the Croatian National Theatre in Zagreb.

== Work on Internet activism ==
Richter has often made work with and about Internet activists such as Edward Snowden and WikiLeaks founder Julian Assange. In 2012 her play Assassinate Assange premiered in Hamburg, and was subsequently shown in Berlin, Cologne and Vienna. Since then Richter has visited Assange regularly in London and has taken part in many panel discussions on the subject of his imprisonment, as well as contributing articles and interviews to various publications, including Der Spiegel, Monopol, and Interview.

In 2015 Richter wrote and directed the interactive multimedia project Supernerds, which dealt with digital mass surveillance, whistleblowing and digital dissidents. Supernerds was co-produced by the national television and radio channel WDR, Schauspiel Köln, and the producers Gebrueder Beetz, and included an online gaming component. The premiere of the piece took place simultaneously on German television, radio, online, and in the theatre in Cologne. The audiences of each show became part of the story, being subjected to examples of hacking and surveillance on their smartphones and laptops. The piece was based on interviews that Richter conducted with whistleblowers, human rights lawyers, hackers, and internet activists such as Julian Assange, Daniel Ellsberg (Pentagon Papers), the NSA Whistleblowers Bill Binney, Thomas Drake, and Jesselyn Radack. As part of the project, and also subsequently, Richter visited Edward Snowden in Moscow.

From 2015 to 2017 Richter hosted an irregular series of conversations with Internet activists at Berlin's Volksbühne during Frank Castorf's last two seasons as artistic director.

Richter is a member of the DiEM25 Advisory Panel.

== Writing ==
A selection of Richter's interviews with Internet activists was published in the book Supernerds – Conversations with Heroes by Alexander Verlag Berlin in German and English. In 2018 she co-authored Women, Whistleblowing, Wikileaks together with Sarah Harrison and Renata Ávila. She writes regularly for the German newspaper Der Freitag.

== Personal life ==
Richter lives between Berlin and Dubrovnik with the German actor Malte Sundermann, their two children, and her son from her marriage to the painter Daniel Richter. Richter is of Croatian descent.

== Productions (selected) ==
- 1999 Revolution Evolution Exekution with Akademie Isotrop at Kunstverein Bremen
- 2000 Bericht für meine Akademie based on Der grüne Kakadu by Arthur Schnitzler, as part of the festival Die Wüste Lebt at Hamburger Kammerspielen
- 2001 Versaut based on Truismes by Marie Darrieussecq at Kampnagel in Hamburg, May 2001
- 2001 Alles wird in Flammen stehen based on texts by Dirk von Lowtzow as part of the Autorenfestival Dramatik 01 at Schauspiel Hannover
- 2003 L’Amérique at Deutsches Schauspielhauses Hamburg with Les Robespierres and Melissa Logan
- 2003 Lear – Ungehorsam, unfreiwillig after William Shakespeare at Sophiensäle Berlin
- 2004 Jetlag #1 as part of X-Wohnungen, at Raumprojekt Hebbel am Ufer
- 2005 Magic Afternoon by Wolfgang Bauer at Kampnagel in Hamburg
- 2006 Ich gegen mich at Fleetstreet Hamburg
- 2006 Verschwör dich gegen dich based on John Cassavetes at Sophiensäle Berlin and Deichtorhallen in Hamburg
- 2006 It's lonely at the top as part of the event Der Berg at Palace of the Republic, Berlin
- 2006 Kennen Sie diesen Mann at Fleetstreet Hamburg
- 2007 Der Kirschgarten by Anton Tschechow at Kampnagel in Hamburg
- 2008 Jeff Koons by Rainald Goetz at Hebbel am Ufer Berlin
- 2008 X-Wohnungen at Hebbel am Ufer Berlin
- 2009 Der Fall Esra, based on the banned novel Esra by Maxim Biller at Kampnagel in Hamburg
- 2009 X-Wohnungen for Theater der Welt
- 2010 Vive la Crise at Garage X Theater Petersplatz in Vienna
- 2010 Tod in Theben by Jon Fosse at Salzburger Festspielen
- 2010 Liebe Deinen Untergang at Theater Oberhausen
- 2011 Berghain Boogie Woogie at Hebbel am Ufer Berlin
- 2011 Leiwand Empire at Garage X Vienna
- 2012 Assassinate Assange at Kampnagel, Hamburg
- 2013 Kippenberger! Ein Exzess des Moments at Schauspiel Köln
- 2013 Assassinate Assange – Reloaded at Schauspiel Köln
- 2014 Brain and Beauty. Eine Suche nach dem Gesicht der Zukunft at Schauspiel Köln
- 2015 Supernerds at Schauspiel Köln
- 2016 Silk Road, Ein Ausflug auf die tote Seitenstraße des Darknet at Schauspiel Köln
- 2019 Antigone by Slavoj Žižek at Croatian National Theatre in Zagreb

== Publications ==
- Angela Richter, "Legenden: Lunch mit dem Staatsfeind", in Der Spiegel, H. 28 2011, S. 104–106.
- Angela Richter, "Sind Nerds die neue Avantgarde?", in Monopol – Magazin für Kunst und Leben February 2014, S. 70–73.
- Angela Richter, "Inside Julian Assange", Interview Germany, H. 5 2014, S. 91–97.
- Angela Richter, "Interview mit Joseph Farrell", in REVUE – Magazine for the Next Society, H. 15 2014, S. 42–49.
- Richter, Angela (2015). Supernerds - Conversations with Heroes. Alexander Verlag. ISBN 978-3-89581-389-4.
- Ávila, Renata; Harrison, Sarah; Richter, Angela (2017). Women, Whistleblowing, WikiLeaks: A Conversation. OR Books. ISBN 978-1-68219-117-0.
