= Gustaf Gründgens Prize =

German theatre award

The Gustaf Gründgens Prize is a German theatre award. It is named after the actor, director and intendant Gustaf Gründgens and is awarded for "significant contribution to the performing arts in Hamburg". The prize is endowed with €15,000. Since 2012, it has been awarded on the initiative of Lions Clubs Hamburg at the Ernst Deutsch Theater. A jury decides the winner.

== Recipients ==
- 2013 John Neumeier
- 2015 Joop van den Ende
- 2017 Michel Abdollahi
- 2019 Joachim Meyerhoff
- 2021 Volker Lechtenbrink
- 2023 Elmar Lampson
- 2025 Lina Beckmann
