= Joop van den Ende =

Dutch theatrical producer

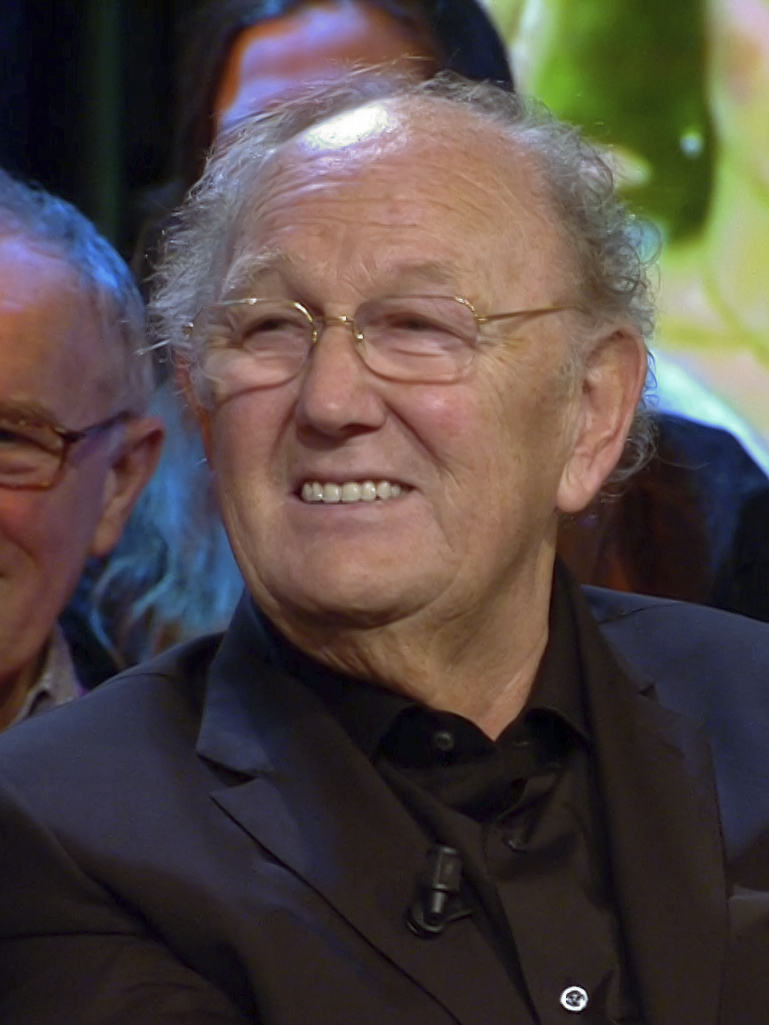
- Born: Johannes Adrianus van den Ende; 23 February 1942 (age 84); Amsterdam, Netherlands
- Occupations: Television and theatrical producer
- Known for: Founding Endemol and Stage Entertainment
- Partner: Janine van den Ende
- Children: Two children

Johannes "Joop" Adrianus van den Ende (born 23 February 1942) is a Dutch theatrical producer, co-founder of international television production company Endemol and founder/owner of Stage Entertainment, Europe's largest live entertainment company. Stage Entertainment was established in 1998 after being split off from the Live Entertainment Division of Endemol. The company has offices and theatres in eight countries (the Netherlands, Germany, the United States, the United Kingdom, France, Spain, Italy and Russia).

== Early years ==
Van den Ende started his career at age 15 as a trainee set carpenter for the Dutch Opera. Ten years later, in 1968, he opened his first independent theatrical and television production agency, Spotlight, followed by the creation in 1971 of Joop van den Ende Theaterproducties. Over the next decade, his stage and television activities continued to expand, establishing him as one of the Netherlands' leading impresarios.

In 1983 he bought a former flower auction building near Amsterdam which he turned into a large studio complex where he could record his television productions. In September 1988, van den Ende produced a Dutch version of the musical Barnum in the Scheveningen Circustheater, starting a new musical tradition in the Netherlands that continues to this day. In October 1993, he opened his first show on Broadway: Cyrano. The production ran until March 1994 and, although the show resulted in a financial loss, the musical was van den Ende's introduction to Broadway and earned him the respect of his American peers.

== Work in television ==
In 1993, Van den Ende and John de Mol created television production company Endemol, combining the activities of their respective television production companies. Endemol went on to become the world's largest independent television production company, creating popular TV formats such as Big Brother, Fear Factor, Dancing with the Stars and Wipeout.

Endemol was listed on the stock exchange in 1996, and in 2000 was sold to the Spanish telecom giant Telefónica for €5.5bn. In 2007, Endemol was sold on to a consortium including Silvio Berlusconi, the former prime minister of Italy, as well as John de Mol, in a deal valued at €2.6bn.

In 1998, before the sale of Endemol, Van den Ende personally bought and took control of Endemol's live entertainment division. This was the beginning of Stage Entertainment, which soon grew into an international entertainment group.

== Work in theatre ==
Van den Ende's early work in live entertainment received international critical acclaim. In 1995, he received five Tony Awards for the Broadway musical Titanic, which he co-produced. In 2001, he was also awarded two Tony Awards for the musical 42nd Street; in 2002 he received two Tony Awards for his Broadway production Into the Woods, plus three more for the play Urinetown.

Under van den Ende's leadership, Stage Entertainment grew rapidly at this time, much attributed to a licensing agreement made in 2000 with Disney Theatrical Productions ( Aida, The Lion King, Beauty and the Beast, Tarzan, The Little Mermaid, Aladdin) and an intensive collaboration in Europe with Littlestar, Mamma Mia!'s production company. This enabled the business to expand into Germany, Spain, Russia, France, Italy and the UK.

In 2007, he became president of the Stage Entertainment Supervisory Board.

Van den Ende returned to Broadway in the spring of 2011 with the musical Sister Act, a co-production with Whoopi Goldberg. This marked the beginning of a new phase in van den Ende's longstanding ambition to develop a continuous stream of original musical content. Following successful launches in Germany (Ich war noch niemals in New York, Der Schuh des Manitu, Ich will Spass!) and the Netherlands (3 Musketiers, Ciske, Petticoat, Hij Gelooft in Mij), he produced Rocky at the Winter Garden Theatre on Broadway and Made in Dagenham at the Adelphi Theatre in London (both in 2014). Rocky won one Tony Award, one Outer Critics Circle Award and two Drama Desk Awards.

== Other activities ==
In 2001, van den Ende and his wife Janine established the VandenEnde Foundation, one of the Netherlands’ largest private foundations, which supports cultural and educational projects and stimulates cultural entrepreneurship. The foundation also provides scholarships to talented young performing artists. One of the foundation's most high-profile accomplishments was the reconstruction of the historic DeLaMar Theatre complex in the heart of Amsterdam. The VandenEnde Foundation — in close cooperation with the Dutch government and together with the Bankgiro Loterij, the Prins Bernhard Cultuurfonds, and the VSBfonds— initiated the Blockbuster Fund, a fund designed to provide a sustainable way to make large-scale investments in culture.

From 2005 to 2008, Van den Ende was active in real estate development through a joint venture that concentrated in mixed-use development and urban regeneration schemes around theatres, active in the Netherlands and abroad.

Together with his business partner Hubert Deitmers, van den Ende is also active as an investor. Van den Ende & Deitmers Venture Capitalist Partners focuses on West European cross media companies via two venture capital funds.

== Decorations ==
- 2007 Medal of Honour in the Order of the House of Orange
- 2000 Commander in the Order of the House of Orange
- 1993 Knight in the Order of the House of Orange

== Awards ==
- 2019 Lifetime Achievement Award of the German Musical Awards, for contributions to German musical theatre
- 2015 Gustaf Gründgens Prize, for contributions to German theatre
- 2012 Honorary Doctorate Nijenrode Business University
- 2011 Honorary Doctorate from Erasmus University Rotterdam
- 2010 Gold Medal of the City of Amsterdam
- 2010 Stage Entertainment receives King William I Award
- 2009 Hamburger of the Year, from the city of Hamburg, Germany
- 2004 IJ-Prijs, for contributions to the economic development and promotion of Amsterdam.

== Musical productions ==
For an overview of all of Joop van den Ende's theatre productions, go to Stage Entertainment.
