= Hanna Putz =

Austrian photographer (born 1987)

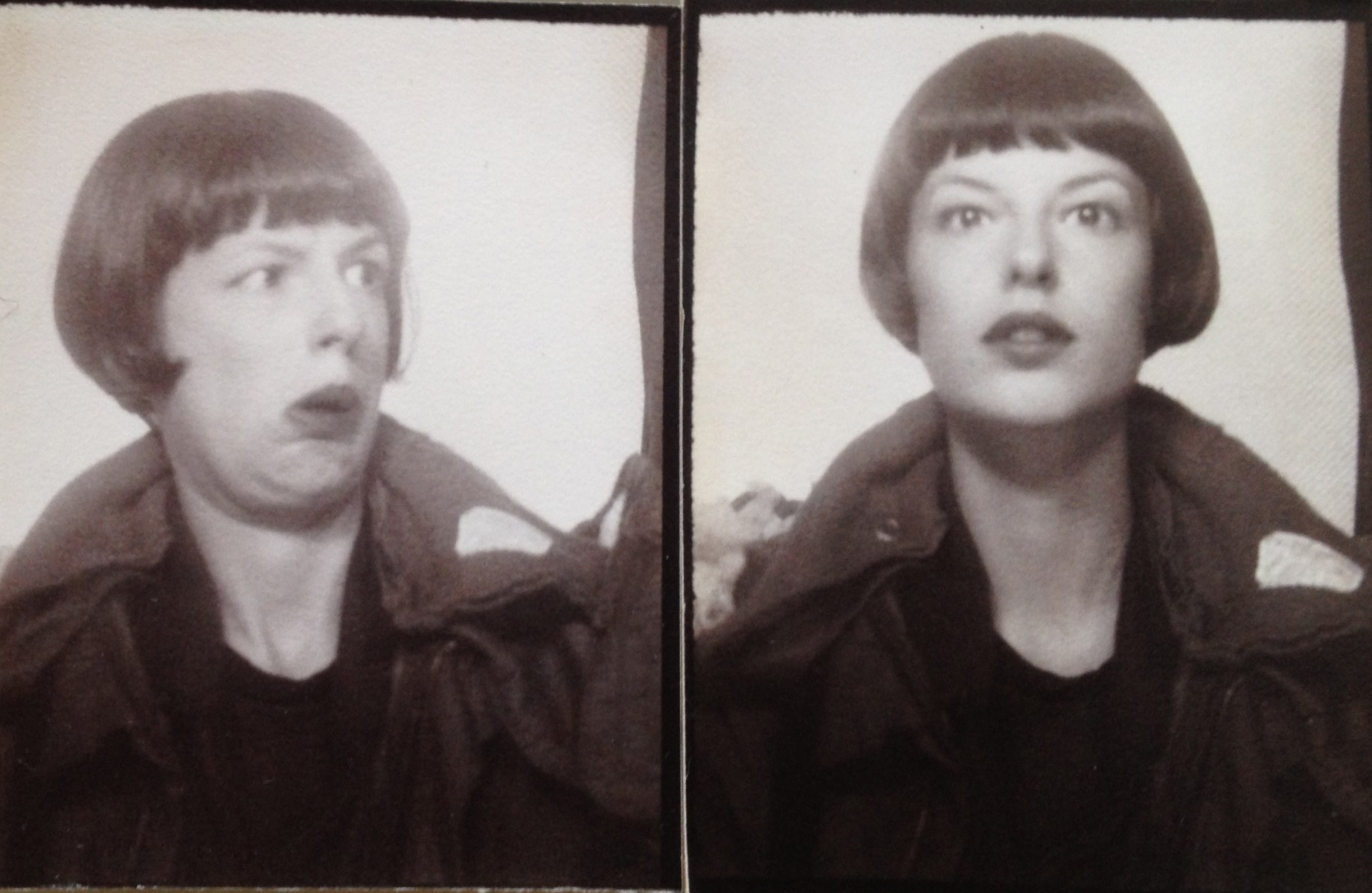
- Hanna Putz, self-portrait
- Born: 1987 (age 38–39); Vienna, Austria
- Spouse: Daniel Richter (artist)

Hanna Putz (born 1987 in Vienna) is an Austrian photographer.

== Life and work ==
In 2005 Putz finished school and signed a contract with a modelling agency based in Paris. Subsequently she moved there and started working internationally for clients such as Sonia Rykiel, Levi Strauss, Vivienne Westwood, Vogue Italia, Vogue India, Elle Japon, Ellen von Unwerth, and Elfie Semotanamong others.

Putz is self-taught and started working with photography in 2009 as she felt that "90% of the photographers I worked with were men, so I wanted to find out if, and how images would change, if I as a woman, would photograph other women".

Her work was first exhibited in 2011 at Kunsthalle Wien in a group show titled No fashion, please! alongside Philip-Lorca diCorcia, Leigh Bowery and Viviane Sassen, which evolved around "the rejection of traditional ideas of fashion and beauty". In the same year she was a finalist at the "Hyéres - International Festival for fashion and photography" at Villa Noailles. Since then she has been a contributor to magazines such as New York magazine, Libération, Die Zeit and Zeit Magazin, Süddeutsche Zeitung Magazin, Spike Art Quarterly, Weltkunst, Vogue (NL), Vogue (DE), TAR, AnOther and Dazed and Confused.

Since 2013 Putz worked less in fashion and instead concentrated more on personal work and collaborations with other artists such as Sophie Thun, Gelitin, Dennis Tyfus, Jonathan Meese, Tal R and Daniel Richter Anna Sophie Berger, and Adrian Buschmann. Her work has been exhibited at MAK Museum of Applied Arts, Lentos Art Museum, MOCP Chicago, FOAM Museum, The Photographers Gallery, Autocenter, Museum Westlicht, Fotohof Salzburg, Kunst Haus Wien and at the 2016 6th Moscow Biennale

[Hanna Putz's] photographs depict predominantly women of her own generation – among them friends and peers of the artist, protagonists of the Austrian art scene [... She] documents the contemporary individual, exempt from all ties, with radical crops and tilted views. In her distinctive, quiet yet powerful, voice, Putz casts a contemporary female perspective (...).

In 2018 Hanna Putz and her partner Daniel Richter founded Pampam Publishing, a publisher of artist books. Everything else is a lie by Putz and White Flag, a collaboration between Hanna Putz and Sophie Thun, were both published in 2019.In 2022 Putz published a photobook consisting of three portrait series entitled 'LARA, SASHA, LILLI' with the publishing house Walther König.

Putz has been a visiting lecturer at the University of Art and Design in Linz, the Schule Friedl Kubelka as well as the Bauhaus University in Weimar, Germany. She has been nominated for various residencies and awards for her photographic work such as the FOAM Paul Huf award, Plat(t)form 2020 at Fotomuseum Winterthur and the 27th Hyères international festival of fashion and photography among others.

== Personal life ==
Since 2020 Hanna Putz-Richter has been married to the German artist Daniel Richter. They live in Berlin and Vienna.

She studies Philosophy & Political and Social Sciences at the Freie Universität Berlin.

== Collections ==
Putz's work is held in the following permanent collections:

- Museum Belvedere 21
