= Stadttheater Düren =

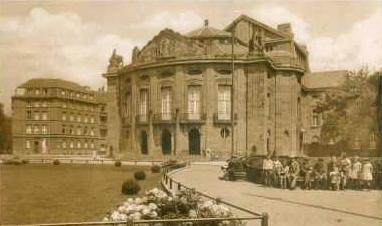
- The building in 1918
Further details
Interactive map of the Stadttheater Düren area
General information
Type	Theatre
Architectural style	Jugendstil
Location	Düren, North Rhine-Westphalia, Germany, Hoeschplatz
Coordinates	50.8019756°N 6.4790975°E
Groundbreaking	1905
Inaugurated	17 January 1907
Destroyed	16 November 1944
Design and construction
Architect	Carl Moritz
Other information
Seating capacity	700

Stadttheater Düren was a theatre in Düren, North Rhine-Westphalia, Germany.

The theatre was built from 1905 to 1907 following a design by Carl Moritz, the architect of the opera house in Cologne, on what is now the Hoeschplatz. A Düren businessman, Eberhard Hoesch, had donated 500,000 Marks for a new theatre; until then performances had been held at inns. After only 14 months of construction, the theatre opened on 17 January 1907. The building, which was in the Jugendstil style, seated 700 people. The theatre had no permanent ensemble but housed visiting performances, including by actors Willy Birgel, Paul Henckels and Asta Nielsen, pianist Elly Ney and conductor Herbert von Karajan.

The theatre was destroyed by bombing in World War II on 16 November 1944. Only the basement and the facade remained. The ruin was demolished in 1952, using the stones for the walls of a cemetery in the Kölnstraße.

Theatre performances were resumed in various venues, first on 25 April 1946 in a hall of a hospital (today: LVR-Klinik Düren), then in the hall of the gymnasium Stiftisches Gymnasium, and from 30 November 1991 in the municipal Haus der Stadt.
