= Daniel Richter (artist) =

German painter

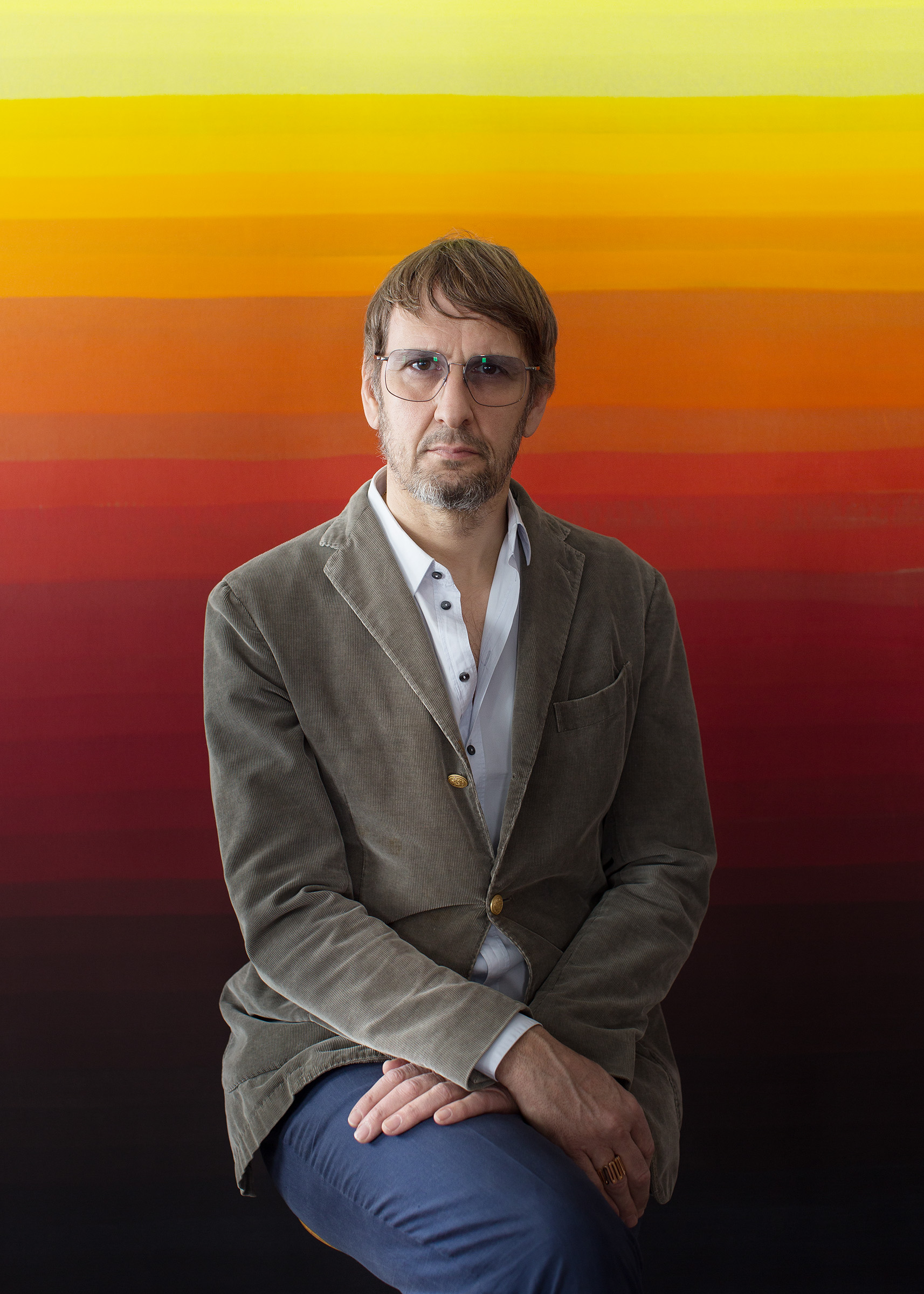
- Daniel Richter photographed by Oliver Mark, Berlin 2017
- Born: 18 December 1962 (age 63); Eutin, West Germany
- Education: Hochschule für bildende Künste Hamburg
- Known for: Painting, sculpture
- Spouse: Hanna Putz (2020)
- Website: daniel-richter.com

Daniel Richter (born 1962) is a German artist. He is based in Berlin, and was previously active in Hamburg. He is known for large-scale oil paintings.

== Life and work ==
Daniel Richter was born in 1962 in Eutin, West Germany. Richter attended Hochschule für bildende Künste Hamburg from 1991 to 1995. Between 1992 and 1996 he studied with Werner Büttner, one of the protagonists, along with Martin Kippenberger, of the revival of expressive trends in painting during the 1980s, and worked as assistant to Albert Oehlen.

Between 2004 and 2006 he served as Professor for Painting at the Universität der Künste, Berlin. Since 2006, he has been Professor of Fine Arts at Akademie der bildenden Künste, Vienna.

Richter's early work was abstract and colorful, described as, "psychedelic – somewhere between graffiti and intricate ornamentation". Since 2002, he has painted large-scale scenes filled with figures, often inspired by reproductions from newspapers or history books.

He was previously married to theatre director Angela Richter, together they have a son. In 2019, he founded the publishing Company PAMPAM Publishing with his current wife, Viennese photographer Hanna Putz.

== Stage design ==
Working for the Salzburg Festival, Richter created the stage design for two stages: for Bluebeard's Castle (2008) and for Lulu (2010). In 2010, Richter designed a series of stage sets for the Salzburg Opera's production of Lulu in conjunction with his solo museum exhibition at the Rupertinum Museum of Modern Art, Salzburg, Austria.

== Awards ==
- 1998 Otto-Dix-Award, Gera
- 2001 Award for Young Art, Schleswig-Holstein, Germany
- 2002 Preis der Nationalgalerie, Hamburger Bahnhof, Berlin, Germany
- 2009 Kunstpreis Finkenwerder, Hamburg, Germany
