= Günter Krämer =

German theatre director

- Born: December 2, 1940 (age 84); Neustadt an der Weinstraße
- Occupations: Stage director; Theatre manager
- Organizations: Staatstheater Stuttgart; Bühnen der Stadt Köln

Günter Krämer (born December 2, 1940) is a German stage director, especially for opera, and a theatre manager who has staged internationally.

== Career ==
Born in Neustadt an der Weinstraße, Krämer studied German language and literature and gained his first stage experience at the student theatre in Freiburg im Breisgau. He first worked as a grammar school teacher and began his theatre career as assistant director in Wiesbaden.

In 1972 he staged Eugene O'Neill's A Touch of the Poet in Cologne. From 1973 to 1975 he was director at the Staatstheater Hannover. The productions here were Uncle Vanya (1973), Miss Julie (1974), Goldoni's Le baruffe chiozzotte (1974), Gombrowicz' Yvonne, princesse de Bourgogne (1974) and Büchner's Woyzeck (1974).

From 1975 to 1979 he worked at the Staatliche Schauspielbühnen Berlin under Hans Lietzau. He staged Le baruffe chiozzotte several times in 1977, Sławomir Mrożek's Emigranten (1975), Canetti's Hochzeit (1976), Schiller's Mary Stuart (1977), Thomas Bernhard's A Feast for Boris (1977) and Ödön von Horváth's Glaube Liebe Hoffnung (1978).

In 1979 he became senior director at the Staatstheater Stuttgart. Here he directed the performances of Philip Magdalanys Section Nine (1979), August Strindberg's The Dance of Death (1980, with Gisela Stein), the world premiere of Tankred Dorst's Die Villa (1980), Wedekind's Lulu (1981), Schiller's Mary Stuart (1982), Seneca's Oedipus (1982), the world premiere of Friederike Roths Ritt auf die Wartburg (1982) and Chekhov's The Seagull (1982). At the Münchner Kammerspiele he performed in Hjalmar Söderberg's Gertrud (1981).

During the 1984/1985 season, he moved to the Theater Bremen, where he was director of acting until 1989. His Bremen productions include the world premieres of Friederike Roth's plays The Only Story (1985) and Das Ganze ein Stück (1986), Goethe's Faust (Faust, Part One 1985, Faust II 1986), The Seagull (1987), Richard III. (1987), Camus' The Plague (1988) and Ernst Barlachs The Poor Cousin (1988/89).

In 1987 he had success in the Theater des Westens with Die Dreigroschenoper,. In the 1990/1991 season he replaced Klaus Pierwoß as artistic director of the Schauspiel Köln.

In 1995, he became General Manager of the Bühnen der Stadt Köln, where he stayed to 2002, responsible also for opera and ballet. In Cologne, he staged Goethe's Stella (1990), Strindberg's The Dance of Death and Albee's Who's Afraid of Virginia Woolf? (1992, with Ingrid Andree), Heiner Müller's Anatomie Titus Fall of Rome (1993), Brecht's The Good Person of Szechwan (1994), Goethe's Faust I (1997) and Ibsen's Hedda Gabler (1998).

Krämer's opera productions include Korngold's Die tote Stadt (1986) and Schreker's Die Gezeichneten (1987, both at the Deutsche Oper am Rhein, Janáček's Káťa Kabanová (1986, Deutsche Oper Berlin), Weber's Der Freischütz (1989, Komische Oper Berlin), Wagner's Der Ring des Nibelungen (1992/93, Hamburg), Verdi's La traviata (1993, Munich Opera Festival), Hindemith's Neues vom Tage (1996) and Wagner's Tristan und Isolde (1998), both at the Cologne Opera.

In the 2009/10 season Krämer staged Wagner's Der Ring des Nibelungen at the Paris Opéra Bastille, the first production of the Cycle there. He directed Mozart's La Clemenza di Tito for the opening of the 2010 Schwetzingen Festival. In 2013 he staged the premiere of Joseph und seine Brüder, a stage version of the novel by Thomas Mann, on 5 December 2013 at the Theater in der Josefstadt.

He staged Die Liebe der Danae by Richard Strauss, Die Fledermaus by Johann Strauss, Schoeck's Penthesilea and Franz Schmidt's Notre Dame at the Semperoper in Dresden.
