= Lucy Greenish =

New Zealand architect (1888–1976)

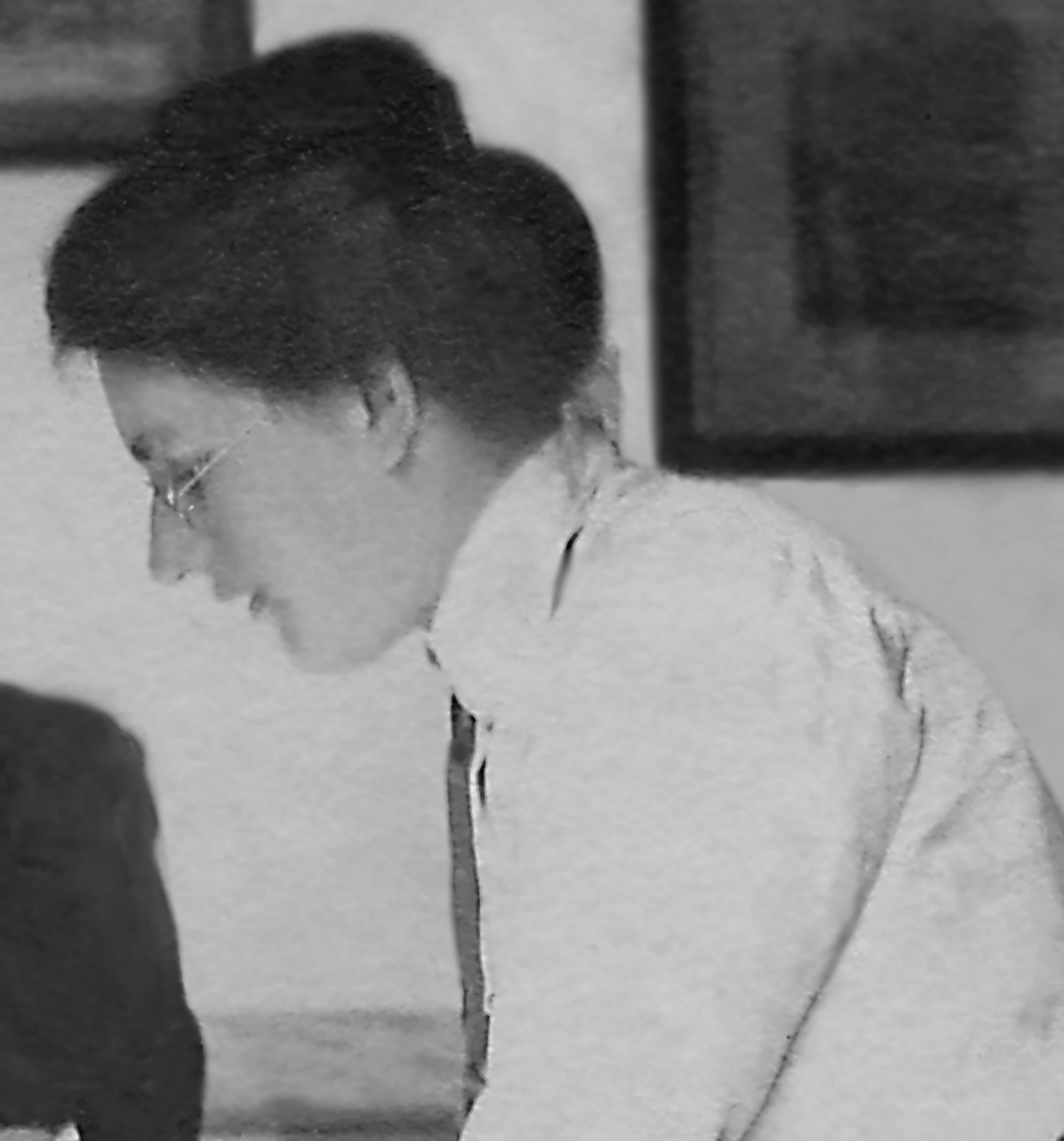
- Greenish in the 1910s
- Born: Lucy Adelaide Greenish; 9 November 1888; Brisbane, Colony of Queensland
- Died: 4 September 1976 (aged 87); Whanganui, New Zealand
- Other name: Lucy Adelaide Symes
- Occupation: Architect
- Years active: 1909–1927
- Known for: First woman registered architect in New Zealand
- Children: 1

Lucy Adelaide Greenish (9 November 1888 – 4 September 1976), also known as Lucy Adelaide Symes, was a New Zealand architect who became the first woman to become a registered architect in New Zealand.

== Early life ==
Lucy Greenish was born in Brisbane, Australia, on 9 November in 1888. Her father was George William Greenish, an insurance manager, and her mother's maiden name was Margaret Emily Eggar. She had two younger siblings: a brother Frank, and sister Dorothy. The family moved from Australia to New Zealand in 1908, but their father George Greenish died shortly after they arrived. Margaret Greenish established a high school and kindergarten in Karori, based on the teachings of Friedrich Fröbel, the international pioneer of kindergarten concepts.

== Career ==
In 1909, at the age of 20, Greenish was employed as an apprentice draughtswoman by the Wellington architectural practice Atkins and Bacon.

In 1912, Greenish prepared the illustrations for an illuminated address presented by the New Zealand Institute of Architects to John Dickson-Poynder, Lord Islington the departing Governor of New Zealand, in recognition of his service as patron.

She was elected as an associate of the New Zealand Institute of Architects in 1913. Following the passing of the New Zealand Institute of Architects (NZIA) Act in 1913, Greenish was the only woman to apply for registration, and was registered as an architect in 1914, becoming the first woman to be a registered architect in New Zealand. It was unusual at that time for a woman to be a registered architect, and the second woman was not registered for a further 20 years. Greenish subsequently moved to Dunedin, and began working for a local firm.

Greenish was the first woman in New Zealand to establish her own architectural practice. She announced the opening of her practice in Lower Hutt in August 1927.

The 2022 publication by Wellington-based historian Elizabeth Cox, Making Space: A History of New Zealand Women in Architecture, is dedicated to Lucy Greenish (Symes).

== Personal life ==
After the death of George Greenish, Lucy, Frank and Dorothy lived together with their mother in Karori until the outbreak of World War I.

Her brother Frank was also a Wellington architect. He assisted with the development of the NZIA Act in 1913 that enabled the registration of architects, including his sister Lucy, in the following year. Their mother Margaret died in 1917.

Greenish was a capable artist. A news item from December 1911 records that Greenish had painted the scenery for a play as part of the end-of-year break-up function for the school run by her mother. Her watercolour artwork was included in an art exhibition in 1923 and reviewed in a Dunedin newspaper.

At age 37 she became pregnant, and moved to Australia to have the baby. Her daughter was adopted in Australia, and Greenish eventually returned to New Zealand in 1926 or early 1927.

Greenish lived in Taitā for around 20 years, and remained single until 1945 when she married Henry Symes. Symes died at their home in Marton, in November 1949.

Greenish died on 4 September 1976, and her memorial is located at Mount View Cemetery, Marton, New Zealand.
