= Stralsund Theatre =

Theatre in Stralsund, Germany

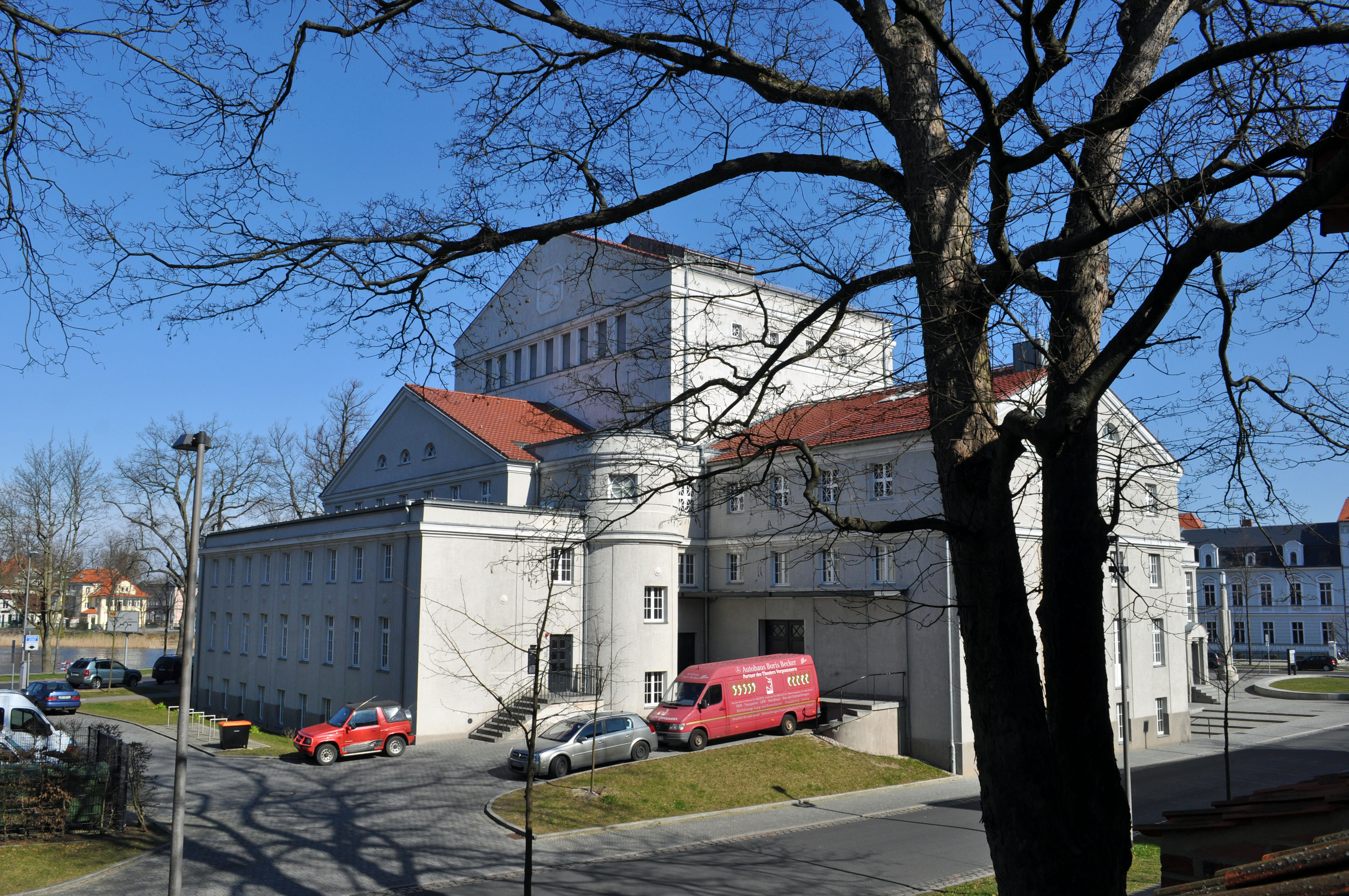
- The building in 2012

General information
- Type: Theatre
- Location: Stralsund, Germany
- Coordinates: 54°19′03″N 13°05′18″E
- Inaugurated: 1914

Design and construction
- Architect(s): Carl Moritz

The Stralsund Theatre (German: Stralsunder Theater) in the German town of Stralsund has a long tradition. Performances of theatre pieces on the Alter Markt are documented in the years 1553 ("Tragedie van deme Daniel") and 1584 ("De Tragedien van Susannen"). The present building was designed by Carl Moritz and opened in 1914. The tradition has continued since the merger of the theatres of the towns of Stralsund and Greifswald in 1994 into the Theatre of West Pomerania (Theater Vorpommern).
