= Carl Moritz =

German architect and real-estate entrepreneur

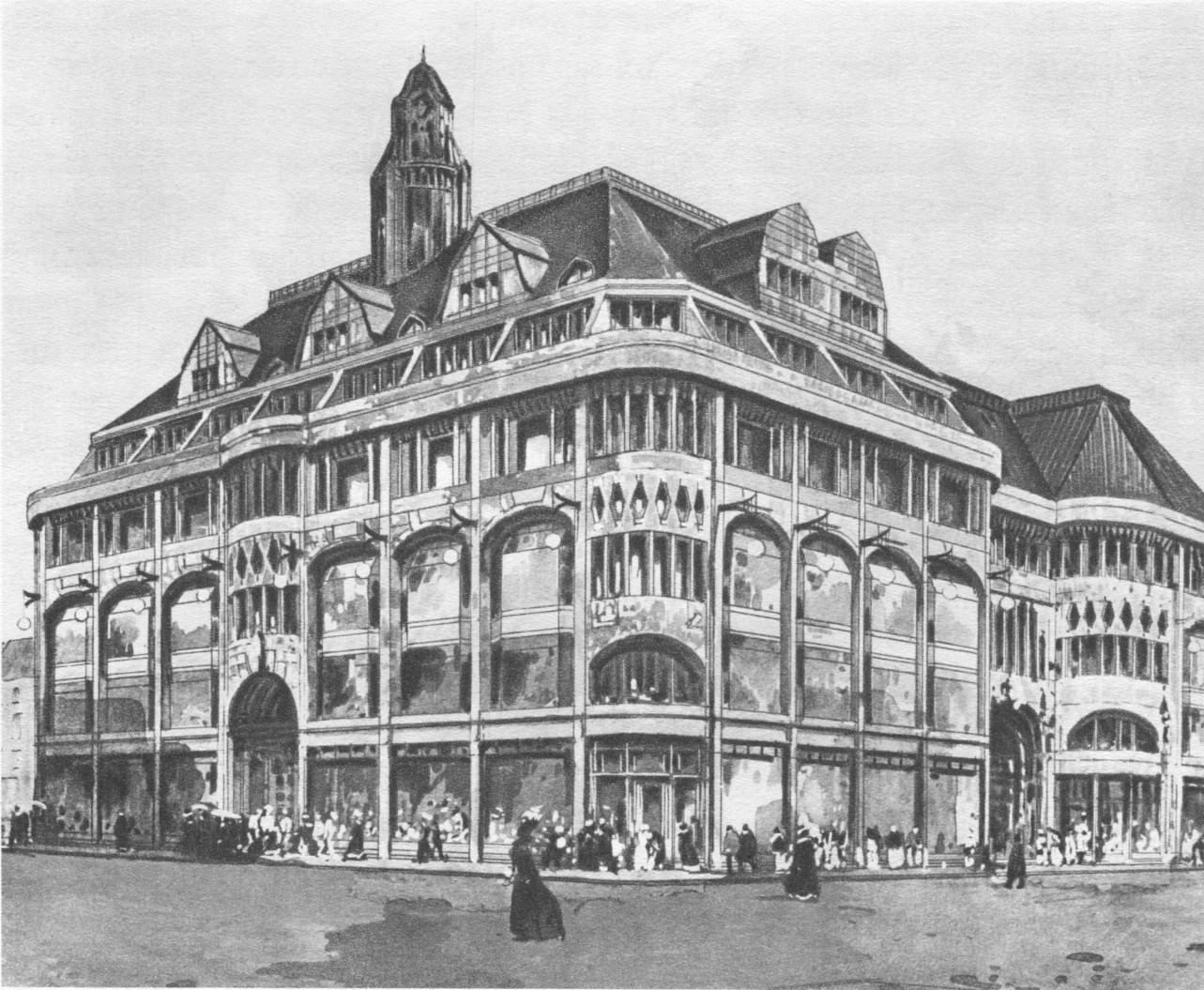
- Stollwerckhaus, Cologne (1906)
- Born: 27 April 1863; Berlin
- Died: 23 August 1944 (aged 81); Berg
- Education: Technische Hochschule Charlottenburg
- Occupation: Architect

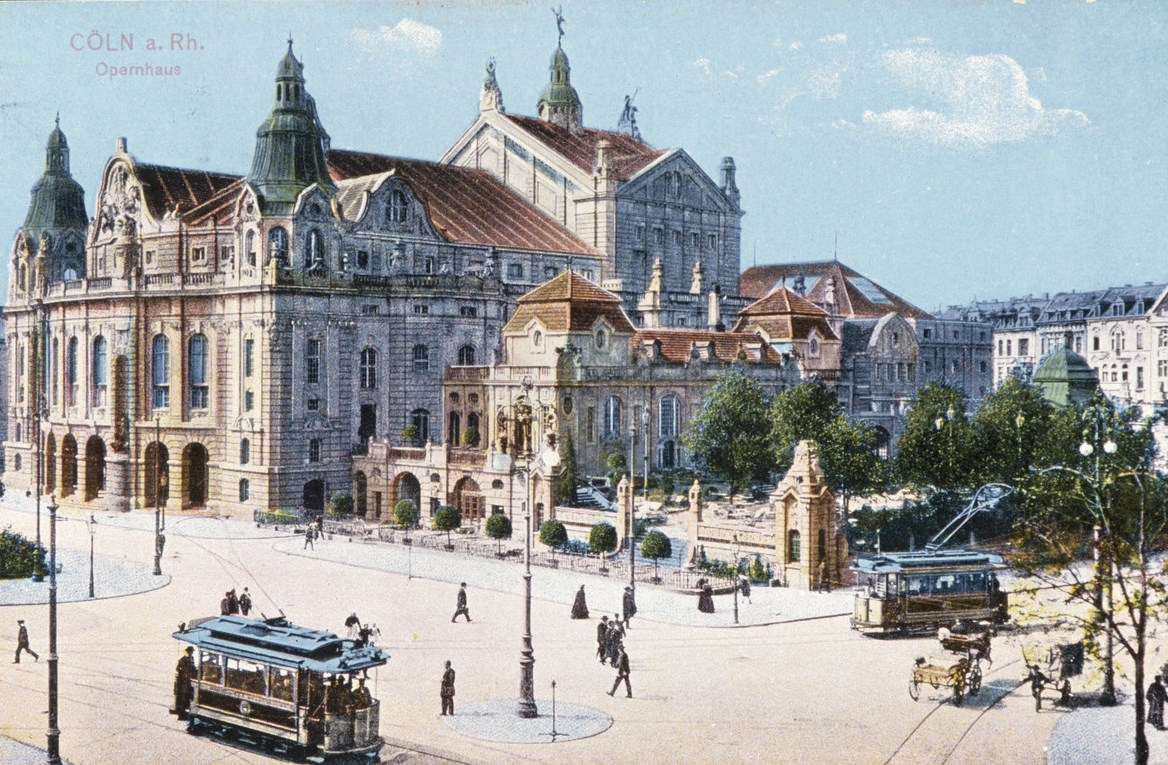
Schauspiel Köln (1902)

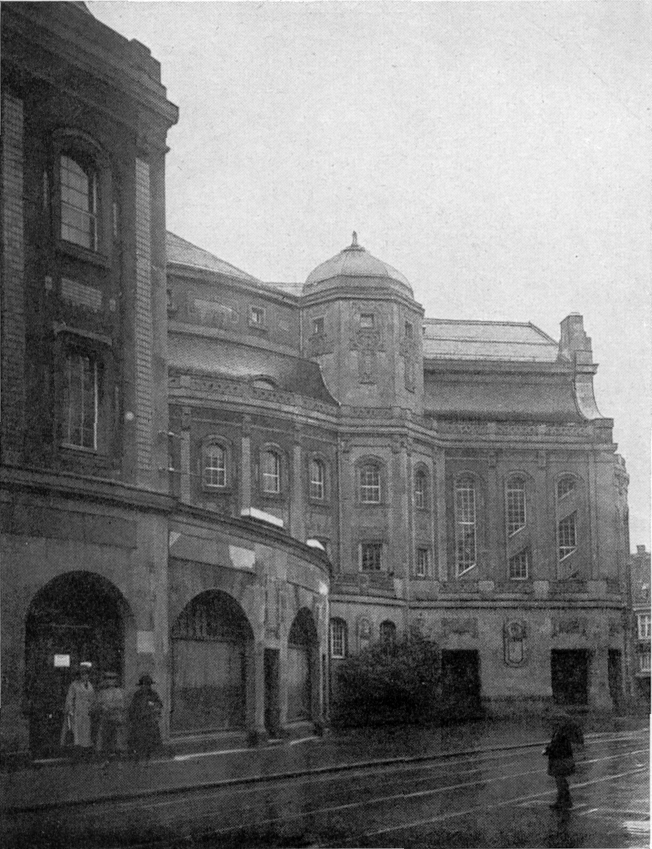
Opernhaus Wuppertal (1905)

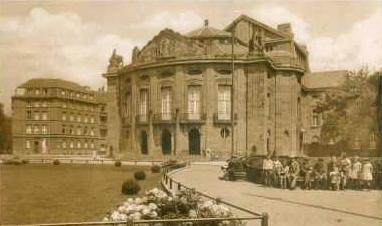
Stadttheater Düren (1907)

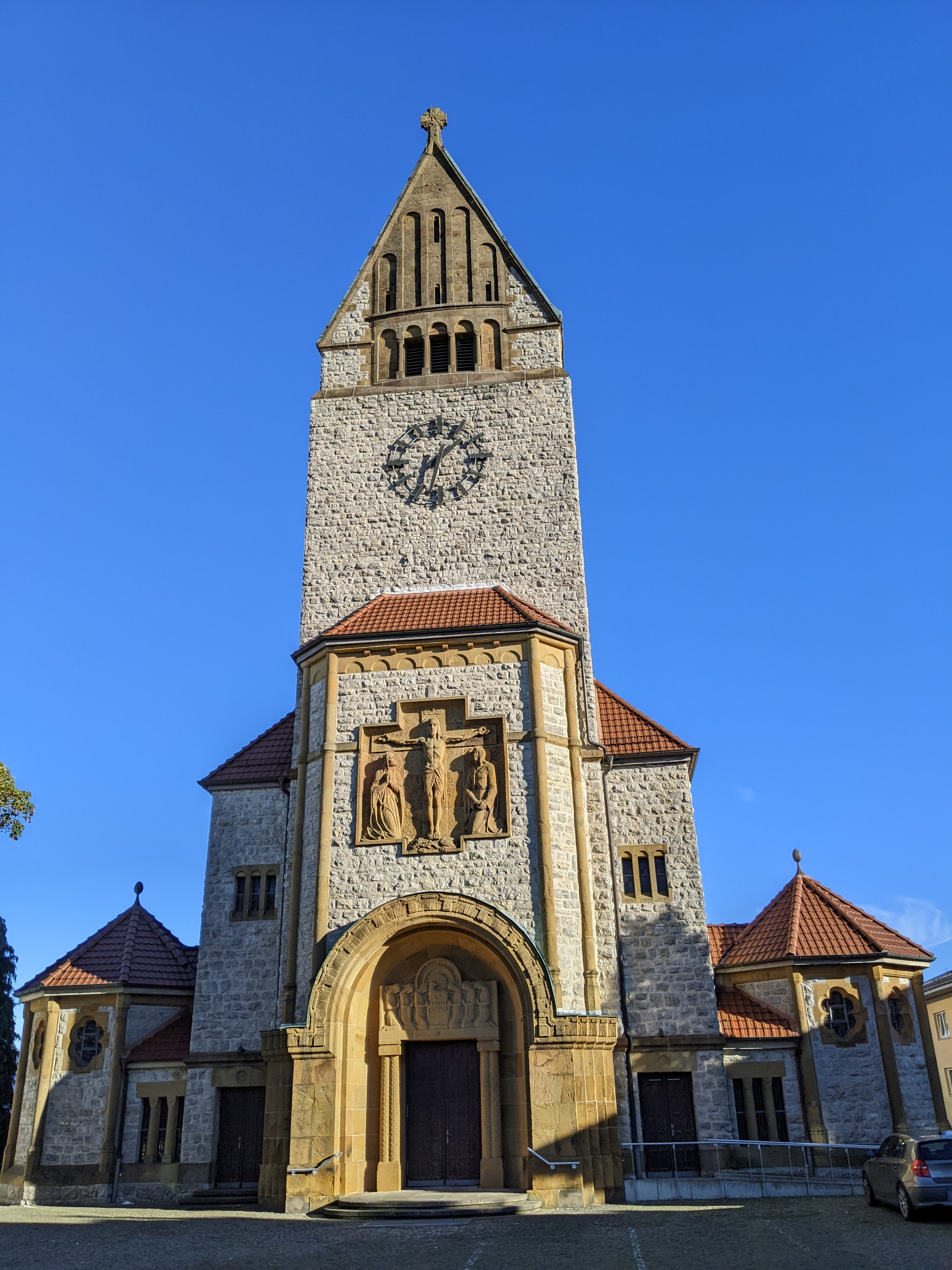
St. Joseph (1910)

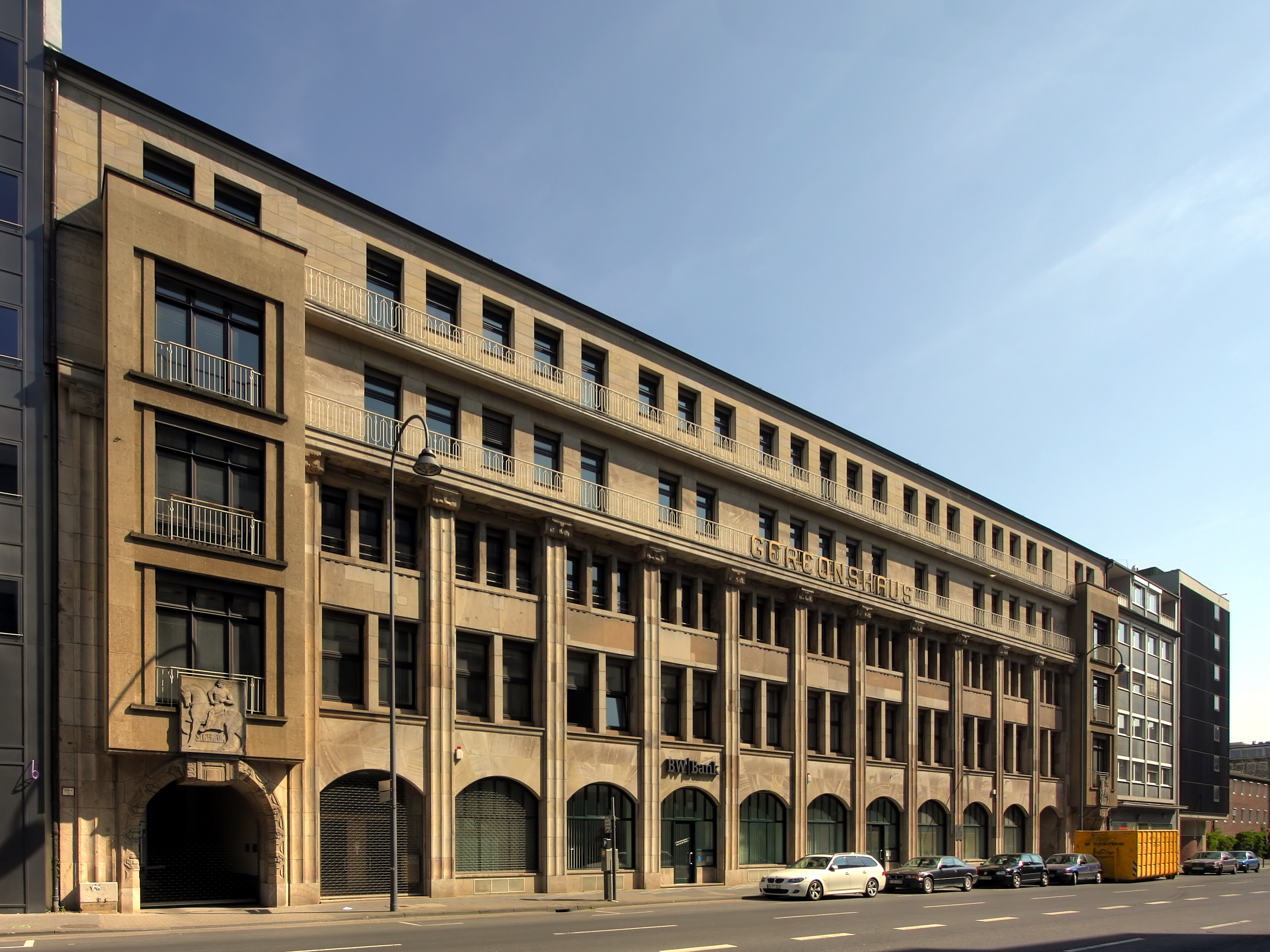
Gereonshaus, Cologne (1910)

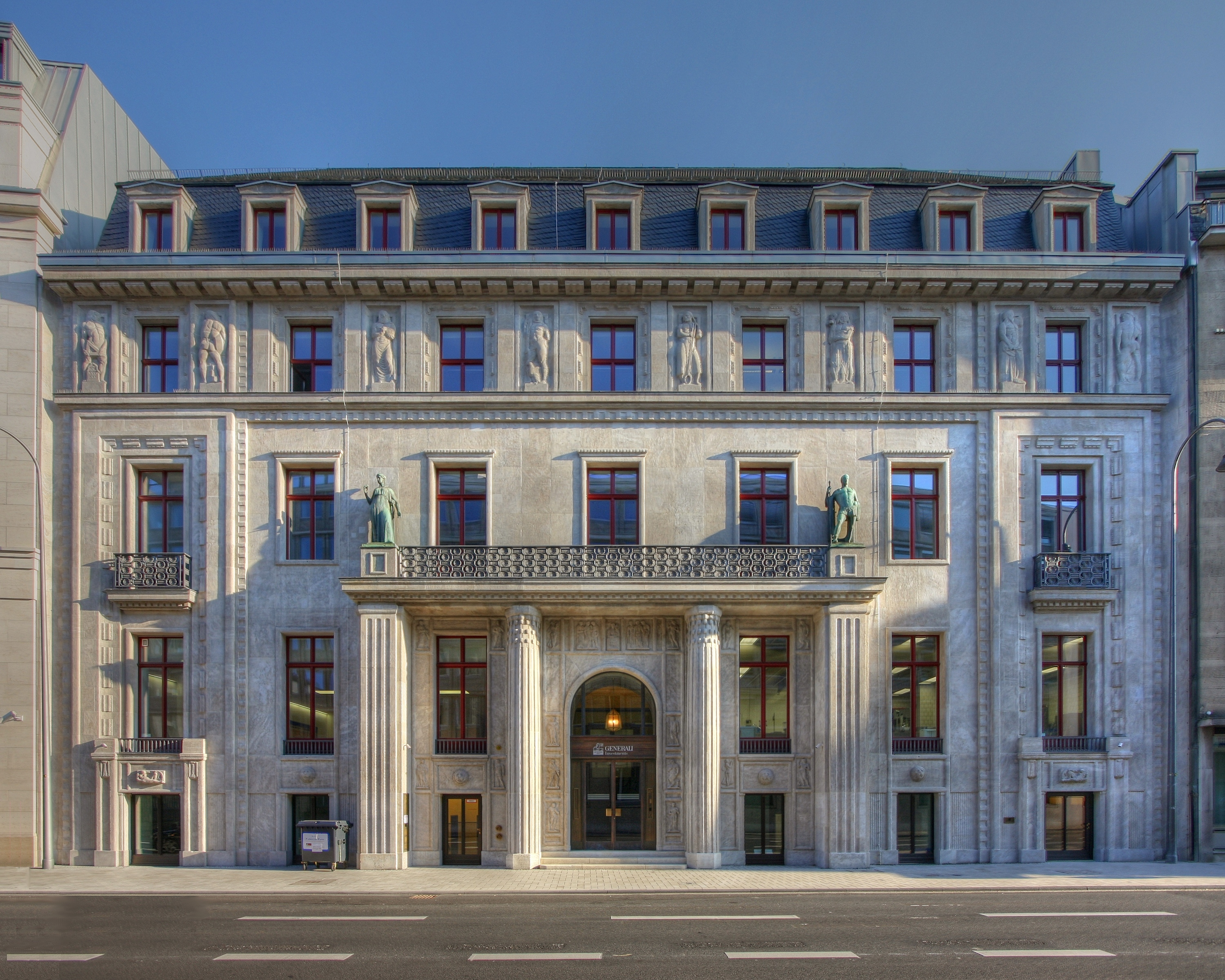
Unter Sachsenhausen, Cologne (1913)

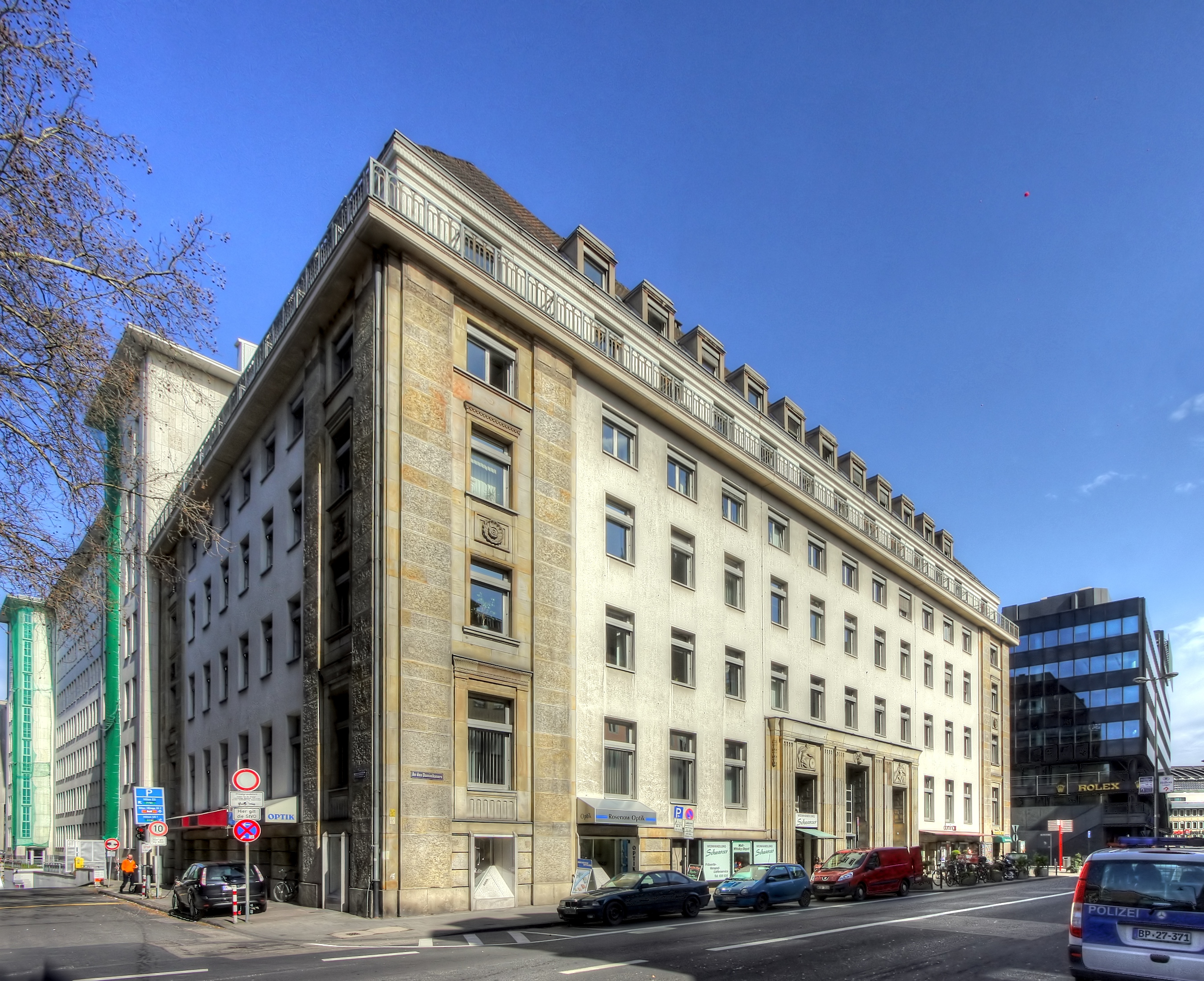
Former Darmstädter und Nationalbank, Cologne (1924)

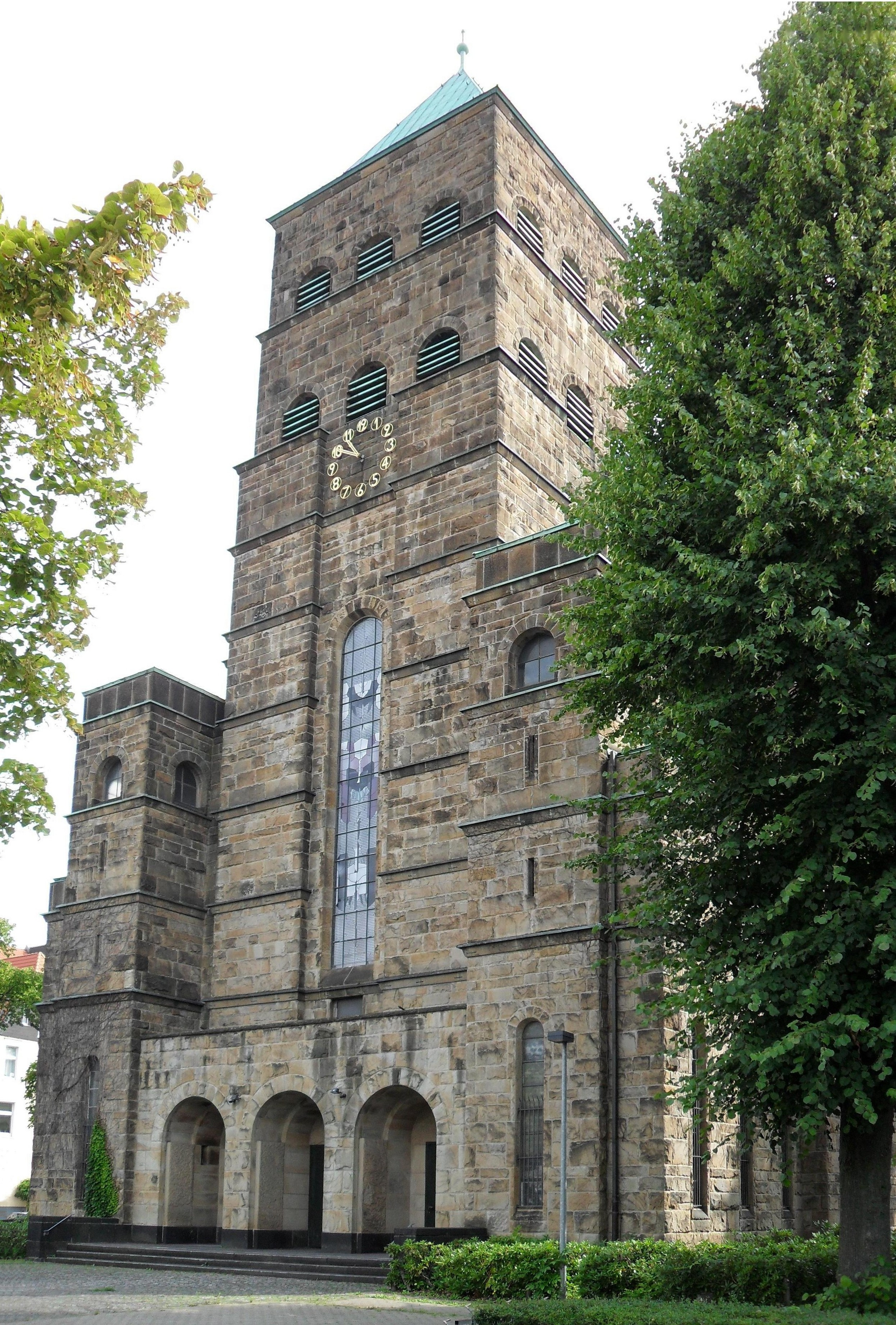
Erphokirche, Münster (1930)

Carl Moritz (27 April 1863 – 23 August 1944) was a German architect and real-estate entrepreneur. Based in Cologne, he built the Cologne Opera House of 1902, and various banks, theatres and churches in Germany. Some of his buildings were destroyed during the last two years of his life in World War II.

== Career ==
Born in Berlin, Moritz studied architecture at the Technische Hochschule Charlottenburg. In 1894 he began his career as an independent architect in Berlin; the same year he took a study trip to England, one year later to Italy. From 1896 to 1898 he was inspector at the municipal building department in Cologne, after which he worked there as a freelance architect. He founded eight architectural firms or companies in Cologne in the 1930s, working closely with the architects Albert Betten and Werner Stahl. In 1934 he retired and settled on Lake Starnberg, where he died in Berg, part of Starnberg.

A large part of his work involved bank building; during his career, Moritz designed about 40 banks, mostly for the Barmer Bank Corporation, for whom he worked as a kind of house architect. About 50 houses and 15 housing estates by him are known. Moritz also planned twenty Catholic religious buildings and seven theatres, both construction tasks for which he can be considered a sought-after specialist. He was one of the developers of neo-Gothic architecture in Cologne. He was very interested in the education of future generations, and during his career, held many lectures and wrote several publications.

== Works ==
Moritz designed theatres, including the opera house in Cologne in 1902, originally named the Stadttheater (Municipal Theatre). It was destroyed in World War II, as was his Stadttheater Düren (1907).

Buildings still in use today include the Opernhaus Wuppertal (1905, was badly damaged during World War II but partially rebuilt), the Stralsund Theatre (1913), the Stanisław Wyspianski Theatre, then "Neues Stadttheater" (New Municipal Theatre), in today's Katowice, and a baking factory that now hosts the Hans Peter Zimmer Art Foundation. Church buildings include St. Joseph (Bielefeld) (1910) and the Erphokirche in Münster (1930).

In Cologne, he built the Stollwerckhaus in 1906, and the Gereonshaus in 1910.

== Publications ==
- "Die Entwicklung des modernen Theaterbaues." (Lecture at the convention of the Verband deutscher Architekten und Ingenieur-Vereine (VDAI) in Düsseldorf on 13 September 1904)

In: Deutsche Bauzeitung, 1904
In: Zentralblatt der Bauverwaltung, 1904, No. 77

- "Neue Theaterkultur. Vom modernen Theaterbau." (in Flugblätter für künstlerische Kultur) Stuttgart 1906.
- "Wohnhäuser und Villen von Carl Moritz, Architekt in Cöln." (in the second extra edition of the magazine Die Architektur des XX. Jahrhunderts.) Ernst Wasmuth, Berlin 1909.
- "Kirchliche Bauten und Klöster, Erziehungsanstalten und Krankenhäuser." (in the seventh extra edition of the magazine Die Architektur des XX. Jahrhunderts.) Ernst Wasmuth, Berlin 1910.
- "Banken und andere Verwaltungsgebäude." (in the ninth extra edition of the magazine Die Architektur des XX. Jahrhunderts.) Ernst Wasmuth, Berlin 1911.

== Footnotes ==
- Ralph Berndt: Bernhard Sehring. dissertation, TU Cottbus, 1998. (in German)
- Klaus Winands: Das Theater in Stralsund. In: Denkmalschutz und Denkmalpflege in Mecklenburg-Vorpommern, volume 6 (1999) (in German)
- Wolfram Hagspiel: Köln-Marienburg. Bauten und Architektur eines Villenvorortes. Bachem, Köln, 1996. (in German)
- Wulf Herzogenrath: Der Westdeutsche Impuls 1900–1914. catalogue, Kölnischer Kunstverein 1984. (in German)
