= Karin Beier =

German theatre director (born 1965)

Karin Beier (born 14 December 1965 in Cologne) is a German theatre director. She is a former artistic director of Schauspiel Köln and has served as the artistic director of the Deutsches Schauspielhaus in Hamburg since the 2013–14 season.

== Early life and education ==
Beier studied English studies as well as theatre studies, film studies, and television studies at the University of Cologne. Through her studies she became involved in theatre. In 1986, together with Elmar Goerden, she founded the internationally composed theatre group Countercheck Quarrelsome, with which she staged a total of nine plays by William Shakespeare, mostly in the original language and often at unconventional venues such as factory and exhibition halls.

In 1991 she joined the Düsseldorfer Schauspielhaus as an assistant director, where she was able to stage her first productions. During her time in Düsseldorf, the Israeli director David Mouchtar-Samorai had a particularly strong influence on her artistic development.

From the 2007/08 season until 2013/14, Beier served as artistic director of Schauspiel Köln. In the 2013/14 season she assumed the leadership of the Deutsches Schauspielhaus in Hamburg.

Beier is married to the actor Michael Wittenborn. The couple have a daughter, the actress Momo Beier.

== Biography ==
After studying English in Cologne, Karin Beier moved into theatre. She established an English language theatre and staged Shakespeare plays in their source language. Theatres began to grow in popularity, and she became the director of the Düsseldorf Theatre. Here she was able to display her first professional theatre production. In Düsseldorf she studied under Iraqi director David Mouchtar-Samorai.

After her 1994 production of Romeo and Juliet she was invited to the Berliner Theatertreffen and granted an award by the leading German theater magazine Theater heute. The following year she directed productions at the Deutsches Schauspielhaus in Hamburg, Schauspielhaus Bochum, Munich Kammerspiele, and the Burgtheater in Vienna.

In 2004 and 2005 she directed at the Nibelungen-Festival in Worms, performing Christian Friedrich Hebbel's 1861 play Nibelungen.

Since 2007 Beier was the director of the main playhouse in Cologne (Schauspiel Köln). On January 11, 2013, Beier said goodbye before her move to the Deutsches Schauspielhaus, with her last production of an antique drama, The Trojan Women by Euripides. It was based on the work of Jean-Paul Sartre.

== Literature ==
Interview with Karin Beier in: Vivien Gröning, Kirsten Sass: WOMAN@WORK Wege nach dem Abi – Wie FRAU heute Karriere macht. 22 Interviews mit erfolgreichen Frauen. Renningen 2014, ISBN 978-3-8169-3237-6.
