= Fleetstreet =

Theatre in Hamburg

Coordinates: 53°32′55″N 9°59′03″E

- Interactive map of Fleetstreet
- Location: Hamburg, Germany
- Type: Theatre

Fleetstreet is a theatre in Hamburg, Germany.
