= Wilhelm Riphahn =

- Born: 25 July 1889; Cologne, Germany
- Died: 27 December 1963 (aged 74); Cologne, Germany
- Occupation: Architect

Wilhelm Riphahn (also Wilhelm Riphan; born 25 July 1889 in Cologne – 27 December 1963 in Cologne) was a German architect.

Riphahn studied at the technical universities in Berlin-Charlottenburg, Munich, and Karlsruhe. He worked for a Siemens construction office in Berlin and in 1912 for "Gebrüder Taut & Hoffmann". In 1913 Riphahn became an independent architect and worked with Caspar Maria Grod until 1931. Some of his more well-known works include the Bastei restaurant and the Cologne opera house. Riphahan worked on rebuilding Cologne's city center after the war until his death.

Riphahn is buried in Cologne's Melaten cemetery.

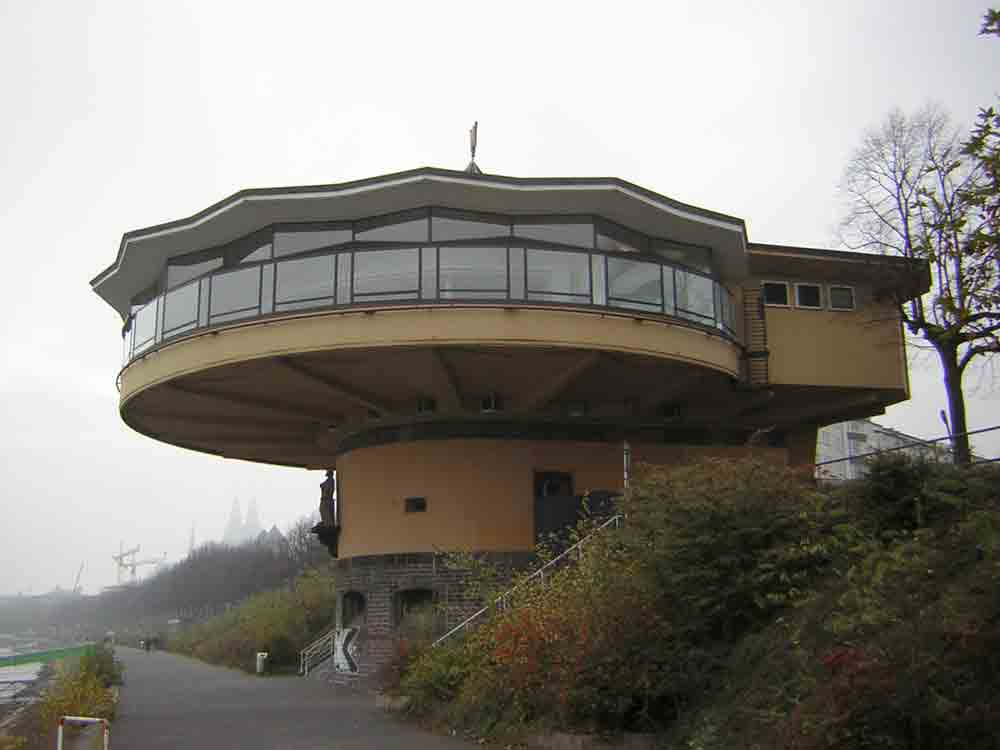
The Restaurant Bastei, in Cologne designed by Wilhelm Riphahn.

== Literature ==
- Heinrich de Fries (Einl.): Wilhelm Riphahn. F. E. Hübsch, Berlin, Leipzig, Wien 1927.

als Nachdruck: Gebr. Mann, Berlin 1996, ISBN 3-7861-1813-2. (mit einem Nachwort zur Neuausgabe von Wolfram Hagspiel)

- Wolfram Hagspiel: Der Kölner Architekt Wilhelm Riphahn. Sein Lebenswerk von 1913 bis 1945. König, Köln 1982, ISBN 3-88375-017-4. [Zugl.: Köln, Univ., Diss.: 1981.]
- Werner Mantz. Architekturphotographie in Köln 1926–1932. Ausstellungskatalog, Museum Ludwig Köln, Köln 1982.
- Clemens Klemmer: Der Kölner Architekt Wilhelm Riphahn (1889–1963). In: Werk, Bauen+Wohnen, 76. / 43. Jahrgang 1989, Heft 3, S. 72 und 74 (mit Literaturangaben).
- Wilhelm Riphahn, Architekt in Köln. Eine Bestandsaufnahme. [anlässlich der Ausstellung Wilhelm Riphahn – Architekt in Köln im Museum für Angewandte Kunst Köln vom 18. September 2004 bis 2. Februar 2005; Katalog] / hrsg. vom Museum für Angewandte Kunst Köln. Britta Funck. Mit Beiträgen von Gudrun Escher, Monika Läuferts und Texten von Wilhelm Riphahn. König, Köln 2004, ISBN 3-88375-881-7.
