= Cologne Opera =

- Interactive map of the Cologne Opera area
- Alternative names: Oper der Stadt Köln; Oper Köln

General information
- Location: Cologne, North Rhine-Westphalia, Germany
- Coordinates: 50°56′17″N 6°57′06″E
- Completed: 1957

Design and construction
- Architect: Wilhelm Riphahn

Website
- www.oper.koeln

The Cologne Opera (German: Oper der Stadt Köln or Oper Köln) refers to both the main opera house in Cologne, Germany and its resident opera company.

== History of the company ==
From the mid 18th century, opera was performed in the city's court theatres by travelling Italian opera companies. The first permanent company in the city was established in 1822, and performed primarily in the Theater an der Schmierstraße (built in 1783 as a private theatre and also used for plays and concerts). The opera company later performed in Theater in der Glockengasse (built in 1872) and in the Theater am Habsburger Ring (built in 1902). The Theater am Habsburger Ring was constructed by the city of Cologne and became its first theatre to be specifically designed as an opera house.

== The opera house ==
The current opera house was designed by the German architect Wilhelm Riphahn. It was inaugurated on 8 May 1957 in the presence of Konrad Adenauer, then the Chancellor of Germany and a former mayor of Cologne. The first opera to be performed there was Carl Maria von Weber's Oberon. In June of that year the house saw its first world premiere, Wolfgang Fortner's Die Bluthochzeit. The following month the opera company of La Scala appeared there on tour with Maria Callas in La sonnambula. The Cologne Opera House occasionally hosts solo recitals and special events; one remarkable such event was concert by jazz pianist Keith Jarrett in 1975 which was recorded and became one of the most popular solo jazz piano recordings of all time, known as The Köln Concert.

The house has a seating capacity of 1,300 and an orchestra pit which can accommodate 100 musicians. It is part of an arts complex on Offenbachplatz which includes the Schauspiel Köln (Cologne Playhouse), also designed by Wilhelm Riphahn and built in 1962. At the end of the 2009/2010 season, both theatres closed for extensive refurbishment and redevelopment. Initially the opera house was due to reopen in November 2015, however problems in renovating the Cologne Opera meant that opera productions have been produced in alternative venues since then. Performance venues have included a converted factory ("Palladium"), a large tent on the Rhein ("Musical-Dom"), a turn-of-the-century courthouse ("Amtsgericht"), and an old exhibition hall ("Staatenhaus"). The re-opening date of the Opera House on Offenbachplatz—whose renovation is far behind schedule and way over budget, and is now projected to be autumn 2024.

In 1904 the company came under the management of the city and took the name Oper der Stadt Köln, performing exclusively at the Theater am Habsburger Ring from 1906 until World War II, when it was badly damaged by allied bombs. Immediately after the war, the company performed first at the University of Cologne and then in the repaired Glockengasse and Habsburger Ring theatres. Both theatres were eventually torn down, and the company moved into its current opera house which was completed in 1957. The modernist design of the new opera house reflected the repertoire that was to characterise the post-war company which has premiered many new operas (normally one per season) and produced controversial stagings of older works. The company performs approximately 25 different operas on the main stage during its regular season which runs from September to June. It has also performed at the Edinburgh International Festival and the Vienna Festival during the summer months. The Cologne Opera has seen many stagings of Wagner's "Ring der Nibelungen"-Cycle, but one stands out: a furious and effective staging by Robert Carsen which was universally acclaimed. Markus Stenz pulled off the extraordinary feat of conducting the entire "Ring" in just two days in 2006. Stenz took the entire production to Shanghai, China, in 2010.

== Children's opera ==
The children's opera is part of the Cologne Opera House and was founded in 1996 as the first children's opera in Europe. From 1996 to 2008, the so-called Yakult Hall in the foyer of the opera house served as its home. From 2009 to 2015, the Altes Pfandhaus in Cologne's Südstadt served as the venue. Due to the renovation of the Opera House, the Cologne Children's Opera is currently in its interim venue in the StaatenHaus am Rheinpark in Cologne-Deutz. After completion of the renovation work at Offenbachplatz, the children's opera will have its own venue there. Musical director of the children's opera is Rainer Mühlbach, director of the children's opera is Brigitta Gillessen, and patron is Ralph Caspers. The spectrum of productions ranges from fairy-tale operas to baroque operas, works of the classical and romantic periods to contemporary pieces and world premieres. Depending on the play and production, performances can be attended by pre-school children, primary school children, secondary school classes, and families but also by senior citizens. For children from the age of 3, there are mobile opera productions that are performed in kindergartens and daycare centres. The Cologne children's opera is the first opera to stage Wagner's complete »Der Ring des Nibelungen« for children within one season (2021.22). Starting in September 2021, an artistically designed "children's opera" light rail of the Cologne Transport Authority (KVB) will run on five inner-city lines for two years to mark the 25th anniversary.

== World premieres ==
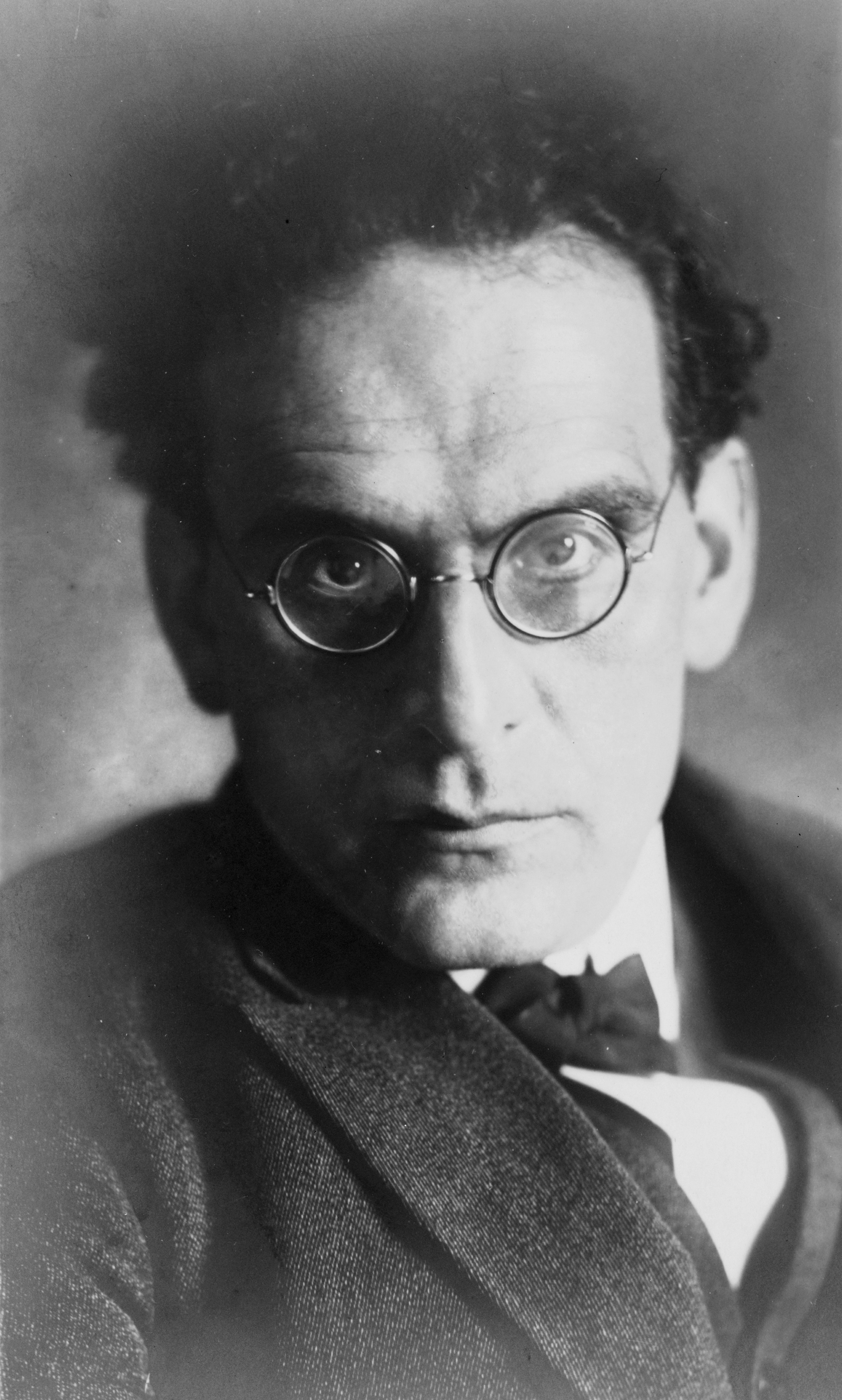
Otto Klemperer, music director from 1917 to 1924

World premieres staged by the company include:

- Erich Korngold's Die tote Stadt (4 December 1920)
- Alexander Zemlinsky's Der Zwerg (28 May 1922)
- Franz Schreker's Irrelohe (27 March 1924)
- Siegfried Wagner's Der Heidenkönig (16 December 1933)
- Wolfgang Fortner's Bluthochzeit (8 June 1957)
- Nicolas Nabokov's Der Tod des Grigorij Rasputin (Rasputin's End) (27 November 1959)
- Bernd Alois Zimmermann's Die Soldaten (15 February 1965)
- Manfred Trojahn's Limonen aus Sizilien (22 March 2003)
- Karlheinz Stockhausen's Sonntag aus Licht (9 and 10 April 2011)

== Music directors ==
The company's Music directors from 1904, when it officially became the Oper der Stadt Köln, have been:

- Otto Lohse (1904–1911)
- Gustav Brecher (1911–1916)
- Otto Klemperer (1917–1924)
- Eugen Szenkar (1924–1933)
- Fritz Zaun (1929–1939)

- Günter Wand (1945–1948)
- Richard Kraus (1948–1955)
- Otto Ackermann (1955–1958)
- Wolfgang Sawallisch (1960–1963)
- Siegfried Köhler (1964)

- István Kertész (1964–1973)
- John Pritchard (1973–1988)
- James Conlon (1991–2004)
- Markus Stenz (2004–2014)
- François-Xavier Roth (2014– 2024)
