= Ernst Deutsch Theater =

Coordinates: 53°34′10″N 10°01′35″E

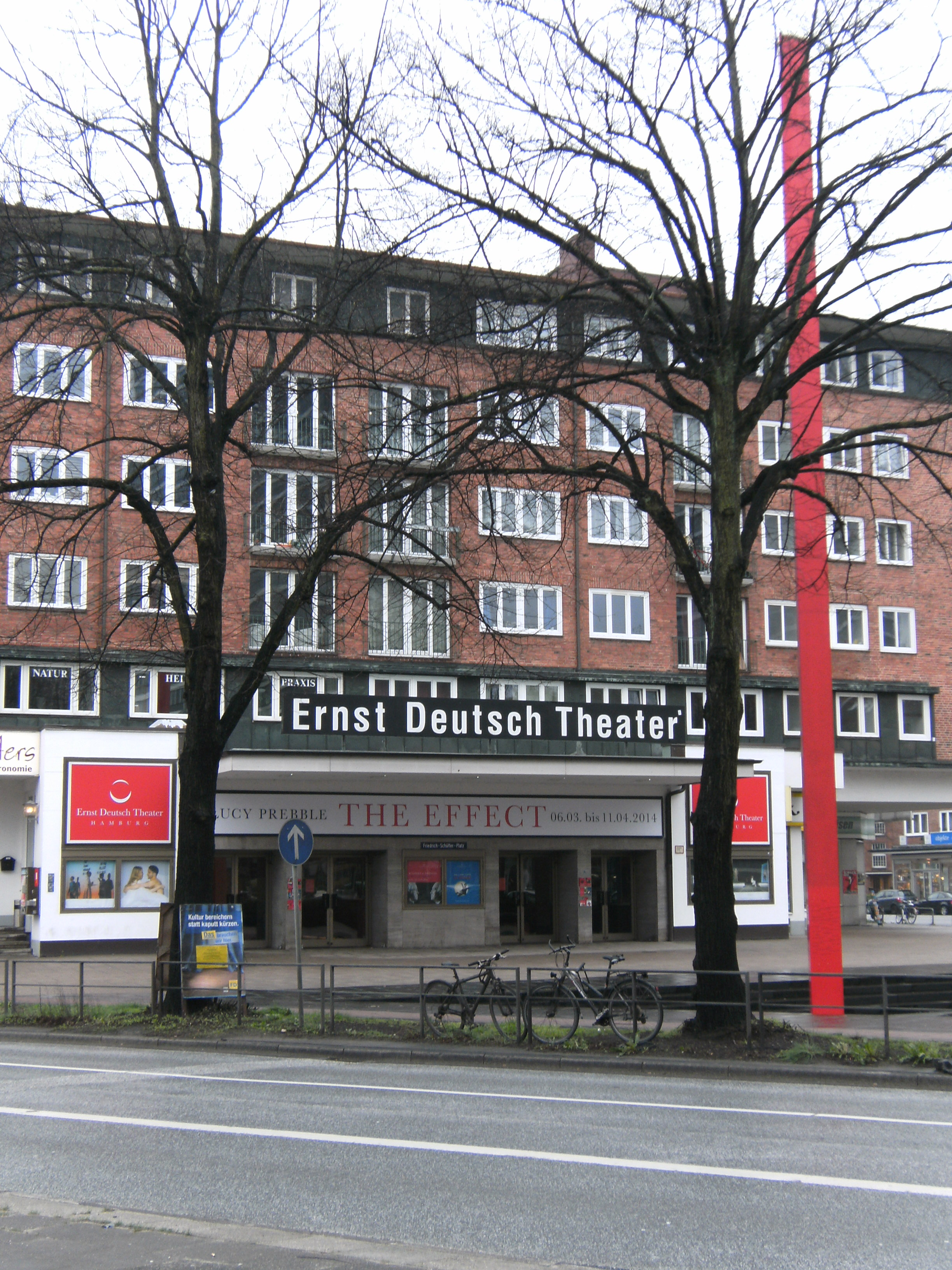
The private Ernst Deutsch Theater in Hamburg-Mundsburg, Germany with red column

Ernst Deutsch Theater is a theatre in Hamburg, Germany. The former cinema in the Uhlenhorst quarter is Germany's largest privately owned theatre. It has been founded in 1951 and was named after the famous actor Ernst Deutsch. Today the theatre with seating facilities for 744 people specializes in contemporary plays.
