= Bühnen der Stadt Köln =

Bühnen der Stadt Köln (engl.: Stages of the City of Cologne) is an umbrella term for different cultural institutions in Cologne. Schauspiel Köln and Cologne Opera are two of them.
