= Anna Montanaro =

German actress (born 1973)

- Born: 2 November 1972 (age 53); Gifhorn, West Germany
- Occupation: Actress
- Years active: 1987-present
- Website: Vita: Anna Montanaro (PDF-Datei; 905 kB), Agentur Glanzlichter (in German)

Anna Montanaro (born 2 November 1973) is a German actress. She is one of Germany's most famous musical performers. After Hildegard Knef and Ute Lemper she made it as the third German artist to play in a leading role on Broadway.

== Life and career ==
Anna Montanaro was born 1972 in Gifhorn. Her parents ran a restaurant business there. Anna wanted to be an actress on the stage from a very early age. She gained her first musical experiences as a choral singer, beyond that she took ballet lessons as a child and was a successful gymnast. After her graduation, Anna Montanaro went to Hamburg to the prestigious Stage School, followed by a three-year practical training as a musical performer.

Immediately after her completion at the Stage School Anna Montanaro was hired for her first leading role. She played "Sandy" in the production of the musical Grease at the Capitol Theater in Düsseldorf. One of her signature roles, was the "Velma Kelly" in the musical Chicago. She played the same part also in London. as well as on Broadway.

Anna Montanaro is married to the musical producer Maik Klokow. Their daughter Marlene was born in February 2010.

=== Roles (selection) ===
- Rumpleteazer - Cats (Zurich)
- Rosalia - West Side Story (National Theatre, Mannheim)
- Sandy - Grease (Capitol Theater Düsseldorf)
- Velma Kelly - Chicago (Theater an der Wien)
- Sally Bowles - Cabaret (Capitol Theater Düsseldorf)
- Velma Kelly - Chicago (Adelphi Theatre, London)
- Velma Kelly - Chicago (Shubert Theatre, New York)
- Mary Magdalene - Jesus Christ Superstar (Bad Hersfelder Festspiele)
- Lucy - Jekyll & Hyde (Musical Dome, Cologne)
- Rosemarie - A Girl Called Rosemary (Capitol Theater Düsseldorf)
- Marilyn - Marilyn - The Musical (Schauspielhaus, Hamburg)
- Donna - Mamma Mia! (Colosseum, food)
- Eva Perón - Evita (Freilichtspiele Tecklenburg)
- Carmen - Carmen - A German Musical (Bad Hersfelder Festspiele)
- Giulietta - Boeing Boeing (Komödie Düsseldorf)
- Grizabella - Cats (CentrO Oberhausen)
- Anita - West Side Story (Stadttheater Klagenfurt) from 29 March 2012

== Publications ==
- "Cabaret" cast album, (Capitol Theater Düsseldorf)
- "The Girl Rosemarie" Cast Album, (Capitol Theater Düsseldorf)
- "Chicago" cast album, Theater in Wien
- "Moulin Rouge", Cast album, tour production
- "Tonight" Cast Album, (Capitol Theater Düsseldorf)
- "Swing Kids" (a movie - Hollywood Pictures, with Robert Sean Leonard, 1993)
- "Jesus Christ Superstar" (Soundtrack - Original Cast Bad Hersfeld, 2003)

== Awards ==
- Hersfeld-Preis bei den Bad Hersfelder Festspielen 2002
- Prix Mediale der Fernsehzeitschrift Prisma 2002
- Beste Musicaldarstellerin 2003 (Leserwahl der Fachzeitschrift musicals)
- Beste Musicaldarstellerin 2004 (Leserwahl der Fachzeitschrift „musicals“)
