= Thomas Krauth =

German businessman (born 1953)

- Born: November 8, 1953 (age 72); Eberbach, Germany
- Education: University of Heidelberg
- Occupations: Businessman, arts dealer and former musical producer

Thomas Krauth (born November 8, 1953, in Eberbach, Germany) is a German business man, arts dealer and former musical producer.

== Background ==
Krauth was raised alongside his two brothers in Eberbach, a small town close to Heidelberg in Germany. After his graduation from school, he took up law studies at the University of Heidelberg and also worked as freelancer and gofer for a concert presenter. He cut his teeth during gigs by The Rolling Stones, Rod Stewart & The Faces, Genesis, Wishbone Ash and many more. During this time he met Michael Brenner, who, too, was later to become a producer for entertainment events. Krauth and Brenner became friendly and maintained this up to Brenner's death in 2011. Brenner died aged 59, following a vehicle accident.

Next to music, Krauth was also fascinated by arts and culture. He decided to tread this path full-time and gave up his law studies. In 1981, he opened an auction house for art at Duesseldorf, namely Th. Krauth Antiquitäten und Auktionen, which was joined by the British auction house and third largest in the world at the time “Phillips Son & Neale” in 1990. Krauth's auction house was operated under the name of “Phillips Deutschland” from that time.

At the same time during the 1980s, the businessman staged musicals, concerts and ballet performances, especially in Duesseldorf and Cologne. Among many others are Sir Andrew Lloyd Webber’s Evita at the Philipshalle Duesseldorf, the musical Five Guys named Moe with the new metropolitan jazz style “Harlem Jump” at the Philharmonie Cologne and performances by the Russian star ballerina Maja Plissetskaja at the Tonhalle in Duesseldorf.

In 1993, Krauth disengaged from the auction house Phillips and took a share in Michael Brenner's concert agency “BB Promotion”. Always on the lookout for innovative and top-class live entertainment, he bought rights to English shows and musicals, most of which had been produced in US, and brought them exclusively to the German stage. Krauth brought George and Ira Gershwin's musical My One and Only as well as their opera Porgy & Bess as guest performances to large and renowned theatres in Berlin, Cologne, Frankfurt, Munich, Hamburg and Vienna in Austria. He also staged ballet pieces Carmen Flamenco and Bolero by Spanish dancer and choreographer Rafael Aguilar. Krauth also secured the rights for German-speaking countries to the world renowned Harlem Gospel Singers.

Tour performances with global stars like Shirley McLaine, Diana Ross or US-American ballet dancer Mikhail Baryshnikov were just as common during this time, as were concerts with Guns N' Roses and Bryan Adams.

In 1995, Krauth boughts rights to the musical Grease and started focusing on musicals, own productions and theatre. He withdrew from the Mannheim concert agency “BB Promotion”, but stayed in close business contact with his friend Michael Brenner.

From 1995 onwards, Krauth bought three theatres in North Rhine-Westphalia: The Capitol Theater in his adopted home of Duesseldorf (1995), the Musical Dome in Cologne (1998) and the Starlight Express Theatre in Bochum (2002). He redesigned the musical theatres to follow his business philosophy, namely best possible customer satisfaction, economical independence and control over the so-called value-added chain.

Ticketing business, catering and merchandise in these theatres were all centralized. Krauth's vendor company “TKS Ticketservice” and its website “kartenkaufen.de” grew into one of the largest concert ticket platforms in Germany, with over 1 million ticket sales each year.

With three large theatres in North Rhine-Westphalia and countless musical productions either produced or presented by Krauth, he soon became a force to count on within the music theatre business.

== Musical productions in theatres at Duesseldorf, Cologne and Bochum ==
After Krauth and Michael Brenner had jointly taken over the Capitol Theater in Duesseldorf, they rebuilt it to be the first musical theatre in the provincial capital. The theatre re-opened on January 20, 1996, and played the hugely successful en-suite musical Grease, which would run for three years and be seen by an audience of roughly 1.2 million, thus ensuring Duesseldorf a place on the list of renowned musical cities.

In 1997, a second, smaller theatre auditorium with approximately 400 seats was created within the Capitol Theater. Known as the “Club,” it was intended as a space where emerging artists could present their projects and develop new work. Productions staged there included Godspell (1997), Forever Plaid (1977) and Schlaflos in Duesseldorf (1997) to life. The venue also marked the beginning of a long-term collaboration with Viennese director Alex Balga and musical artist Anna Montanaro. Both later achieved international recognition and have continued to maintain professional ties with the Capitol Theater.

In 1998/99 Krauth produced The Rocky Horror Show, directed by Matthias Davids, in the Club and from 1999 to 2001 the Kander-Ebb musical Cabaret, directed by Alex Balga. Anna Montanaro played Sally Bowles after she had been vastly successful in Chicago at London's West End. This staging received a huge and positive media response.

Anna Montanaro: Live – a one-woman show (2002) as well as the world premiere of the musical Das Mädchen Rosemarie (2004) were both produced in the Capitol Theater's Club by Krauth. Das Mädchen Rosemarie tells the story of high class fancy lady Rosemarie Nitribitt. The musical is close to Erich Kuby’s post war novel and was directed by Dirk Witthuhn with music by Heribert Feckler.

Following Grease into the large theatre auditorium, which had roughly 1200 seats, was the musical Rent (1999) which won four Tony Awards in New York. In Duesseldorf it was produced in cooperation with Marek Lieberberg.

Krauth’s Capitol Theater also played the original Broadway production of the classic Chicago (2001) which was staged together with producers Barry and Fran Weissler, as well as an own production of the dance musical Miami Nights (2002 – 2004) and the original Cats production (2004/2005).

Krauth and star chef Alfons Schuhbeck created a musical dinner show together. Based on the renowned chef’s culinary expertise, entertaining dinner shows combining musical hits with top class cuisine were played from 2004, named Tonight, Last Christmas or That's Life.

Next to musical theatre productions the Duesseldorf producer also established a series of lectures “Duesseldorf speeches about culture and economy” (1998 – 2001) with selected representatives from culture, economy and politics. The panel, which was under the patronage of Wolfgang Clement (North Rhine-Westphalia's premier at the time) was also hosted by the Capitol Theater.

In 1998, the theatre producer bought the Musical Dome at Cologne. Michael Brenner and himself produced the dance musical Saturday Night Fever together with the original producer Robert Stigwood. This was a large en-suite production and also the German premiere of the show. Krauth and Brenner had already been co-producers at the world premiere in London in 1998. Over a time of roughly three years, between September 11, 1999, to June 30, 2002, more than a million viewers saw the act version of the Bee Gees musical at Cologne.

Further highlights were the production of Frank Wildhorn's Jekyll & Hyde (2003/2004), Michael Brenner's production of the Queen musical We Will Rock You (2004–2008) and the German premiere of Spamalot (2009) by British Comic group Monty Python.

In 2002, Krauth and his business partner Andrea Friedrichs took over the roller skate musical Starlight Express at Bochum and boosted its success with artistic innovations and creative marketing measures. In 2008, Starlight Express celebrated its 20th birthday and it is deemed to be the most successful musical in the world, even with its own entry to the Guinness Book of Records. Over 12 million viewers had seen the show at the time – today the number is over 16 million.

In 2005, the Starlight Express producer and artists were granted a special award and received a Platinum CD by Universal Music for achieving sales of over 400,000 live albums in 17 years.

Krauth was also given credit as Starlight Express producer when he received a prize from the “Bochumer Marketing Club” for his commitment towards an “outstanding musical theatre” and his “dedication to the region of Bochum”.

One of these creative marketing ideas was, for instance, brought to life in 2004: Car manufacturer Ford introduced a limited edition “Starlight Express” of Ford cars to the market. The video ads for these were lined with scenes from the musical. 2008 saw another special event: The ZDF show Musical Showstar audited for new performers for the main characters in Starlight Express, “Rusty” and “Pearl”. This casting show was aired in several parts and was presented by Thomas Gottschalk.

== Tour productions and guest performances in other cities ==
Both Saturday Night Fever as well as the 1980s musical Miami Nights were produced by Krauth as tour productions, having been successful en-suite shows for years. The tour productions played Alte Oper at Frankfurt, Deutsches Theater in Munich, Ronacher Theater in Vienna, Musical Theater at Basel and Admiralspalast at Berlin. Grease was also produced at the Theater des Westens in Berlin and played full house from September to December 1998.

Krauth's Duesseldorf production of Cabaret with Anna Montanaro as main character was invited to the Thalia Theater at Hamburg and played there successfully for three weeks.

In 2009, Krauth handed the musical business and connected ticketing business to producer Maik Klokow; however, he remained the owner of the Capitol Theater and was managing director of Starlight Express until 2011. Maik Klokow and his group of companies called “Mehr! Entertainment” now run, amongst others, the Capitol Theater, the Musical Dome and Starlight Express.

Today, Krauth travels the world and is a passionate golfer. He lives in Phuket (Thailand) and Duesseldorf. His private focus remains on arts and music.

== CD releases ==
Krauth has released a number of CDs under the label of “Heartbreak Records”, amongst them Saturday Night Fever, Miami Nights, Das Mädchen Rosemarie and Tonight.

== Literature ==
- Hundert Düsseldorfer Köpfe. Droste Verlag, ISBN 3-7700-1193-7. (German)
