= Körber (surname) =

Körber, Korber or Koerber is a German occupational surname for a basket maker. Notable people with the surname include:

- Adolf-Victor von Koerber (1891–1969), German officer and author
- Bette Korber, American biologist
- Carsten Körber (born 1979), German politician
- Claudius Körber (born 1982), German actor
- Dorothy Korber, American journalist
- Hilde Körber (1906–1969), Austrian actress
- Eberhard von Koerber (1938–2017), German businessman
- Ernest von Koerber (1850–1919), Austrian politician and nobleman
- Gustav Wilhelm Körber (1817–1885), German lichenologist
- Kurt A. Körber (1909–1992), German businessman
- Leonid Lwowitsch Körber
- Leila Marie Koerber (1868–1934), birth name of Canadian actress and comedian Marie Dressler
- Martin Körber (1817–1893), Baltic German writer, composer, and pastor
- Rick Koerber (born 1973 as Claud Franklin), American businessman and criminal
- Sebastian Körber (born 1980), German politician
- Serge Korber (1936–2022), French film director

== See also ==
- Kerber (surname)
