= Bastian Semm =

German actor

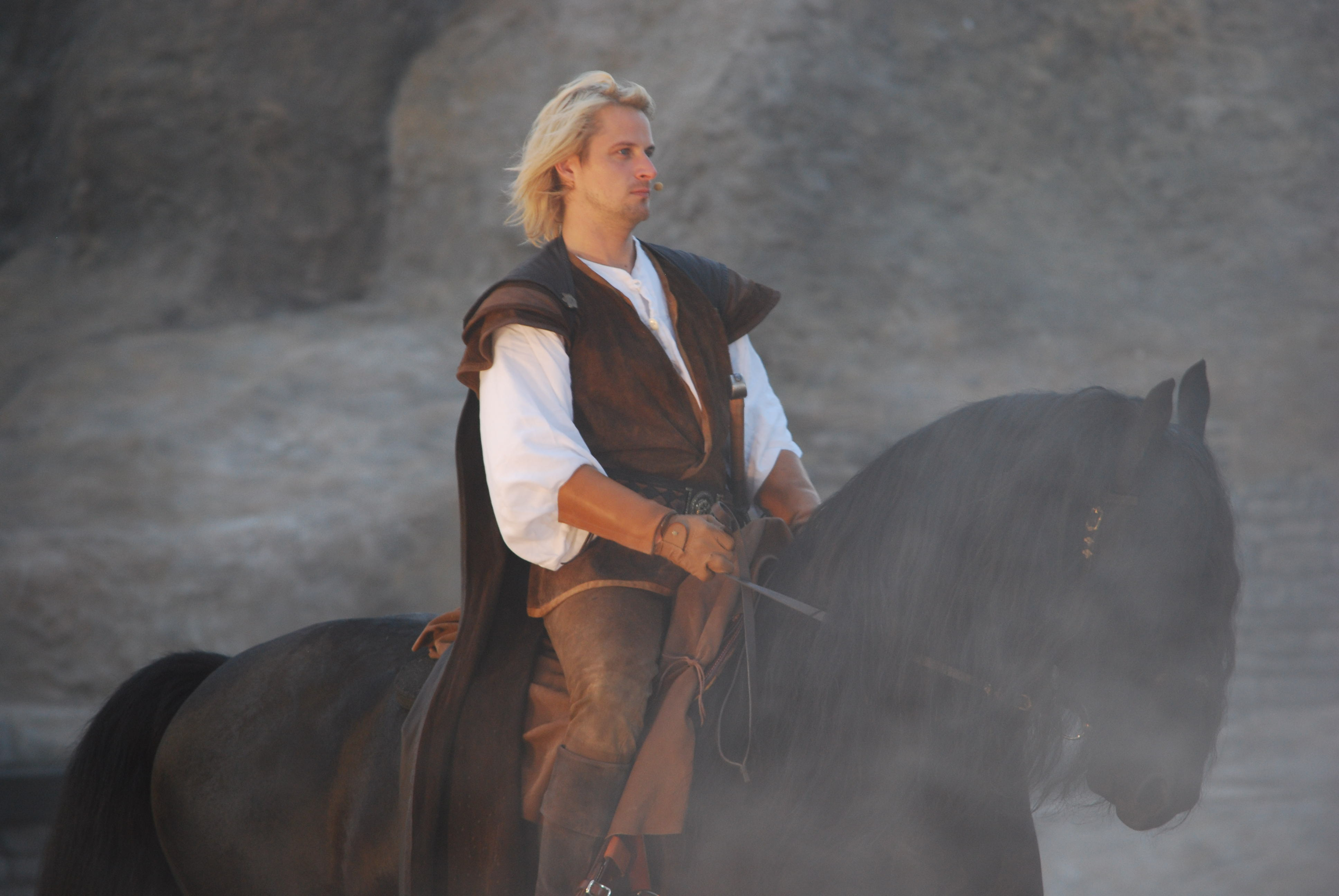
- Born: 26 September 1979 (age 46); Bochum, West Germany
- Occupation: Actor
- Years active: 2004-present
- Website: Homepage of Bastian Semm (in German)

Bastian Semm (born 26 September 1979 in Bochum) is a German actor.

== Life and career ==
Bastian Semm was born in 1979 in Bochum and grew up there until he graduated from high school in 1999. He studied drama at the University of Music and Theatre Felix Mendelssohn Bartholdy in Leipzig and was firmly committed at the Theater Basel until 2009. He played Octavian in Shakespeare's Julius Caesar.

In 2009 he was awarded with the Rosenthal Talent Award for his portrayal of "Peer Gynt" at the Luisenburg Festival in Wunsiedel. At the Theatre of Heidelberg he was seen in the plays Lennon and East of Eden. In the summer of 2011 he played the role of Hamlet at the Bad Hersfelder Festspiele for which he gained the Hersfeld-Preis.

Since 2011 he is touring through Germany with CASH - a singer of songs a musical program on the life of actor and singer Johnny Cash

In the summer of 2012, he played again at the Luisenburg Festival, this time in the theater production of Romeo and Juliet as Romeo. Since June 2013 Bastian Semm is playing the new Störtebeker in Ralswiek on the island of Rügen at the Störtebeker Festival.

== Awards ==
- 2009: Rosenthal Talent Award for the role of "Peer Gynt"
- 2011: Hersfeld-Preis for the title role in "Hamlet"

== Theater roles (selection) ==
- 2009: Peer Gynt (Luisenburg Festival) as Peer Gynt
- 2011: Hamlet Bad Hersfelder Festspiele as Hamlet
- 2012: Romeo & Juliet (Luisenburg Festival) as Romeo
- 2013: Störtebeker Festival as Störtebeker

== Filmography (selection) ==
- 2004: Das Abenteuer Freiheit
- 2004: Tatort - Friedhof (TV-series)
- 2004: Hallo Robbie! (TV-series)
- 2005: Eine Chance für die Liebe
- 2006: City for Ransom
- 2014: Winnetous Sohn
- 2015: Verbotene Liebe (TV-series)
