= Mario Ramos (actor) =

Spanish actor, musician and poet (born 1973)

- Born: 30 June 1973 (age 53); Salamanca, Spain
- Occupation: Actor
- Years active: 1993-present

Mario Ramos (born 30 June 1973 in Salamanca) is a Spanish actor, musician and poet.

== Life and career ==
Mario Ramos was born in 1973 in Salamanca in Spain and grew up in Germany. He took acting lessons at the theater school Bongôrt van Roy in Bergisch Gladbach. During his training, he played at the Chamber Stage in Bergisch Gladbach in plays like Kiss Me, Kate, Weisman and Rotgesicht or Stella. These roles were followed by productions in Cologne where he played various other roles.

After the study Ramos was active in numerous projects in North Rhine-Westphalia, with several engagements again in Cologne and Bergisch Gladbach. In recent years he played at various local theaters there, such as the Cliff in Cabaret, George Garga in In the Jungle of Cities or the Happy in Arthur Miller's Death of a Salesman.

In the mid-2000s Ramos was seen at the Bad Hersfelder Festspiele in Shakespeare's A Midsummer Night's Dream, in Goethe's Faust or in Camelot. As Mordred in Camelot he got the Hersfeld-Preis in 2005. Since 2009 he played in the Störtebeker Festival on the island of Rügen. In May 2011, Mario Ramos was seen in the Hamburg musical Revolver im Klavier.

In the year 2000 his poems were published in the Martin Werhand Verlag anthology Junge Lyrik II. In 2002 he played his first film role.

Ramos has lived since 2002 with his companion the actress Saskia Fischer in Hamburg, with whom he has a son.

== Awards ==
- 2005: Hersfeld-Preis for his role as Mordred in Camelot

== Theater roles (selection) ==
1993: Kiss Me, Kate: Lucentio/Paul; 1994: Weisman und Rotgesicht: Rotgesicht; 1994: Kommt so wie ihr seid: John; 1995: Preparadise sorry now: Ian; 1996: Endspiel: Hamm; 1997: Stella: Fernando; 1997: Mein Kampf: Hitler; 1998: Der Tod und das Mädchen: Gerardo/Roberto; 1998: Marat/Sade: Sade; 1999: Kuss der Spinnenfrau (Musical): Molina; 1999: Straßenhamlet: Hamlet; 2000: Wer hat noch nicht...?; 2000: Romeo and Juliet: Abram; 2001: Vermummte: Naím; 2002: Der Besuch der alten Dame: Roby/Reporter; 2002: Ist das nicht mein Leben: P.Hill; 2003: Bluthochzeit: Mond/Sänger; 2003: Der Pelikan: Frederik; 2004: Death of a Salesman: Happy; 2004: Symphonie der Toten: Aidin; 2004: Der Besuch der alten Dame: Loby (Bad Hersfelder Festspiele); 2005: Der Lord von Barmbeck: E. Hannack; 2005: Die Affaire in der Rue de Lourcine: Potard	2005: A Midsummer Night's Dream: Demetrius (Bad Hersfelder Festspiele); 2005: Camelot: Mordred (Bad Hersfelder Festspiele); 2005: Cabaret: Cliff; 2006: Im Dickicht der Städte: George Garga; 2006: Faust: Hexe (Bad Hersfelder Festspiele); 2006: Die Bremer Stadtmusikanten: Der Hahn (Bad Hersfelder Festspiele); 2006: Nathan der Weise: Derwisch; 2008/2009: Happy End: Governor/Kommissar; since 2009: Holms: Vorsicht Baustelle!: Mario; 2009: Das Vermächtnis: Marcello da Pinci (Störtebeker Festival); 2010: Der Fluch des Mauren: Baptista de Rocca (Störtebeker Festival); 2011: Revolver im Klavier: Der schöne Hartmut, Erwin & Moses; 2011/2012: Anatevka: Perchik; 2011: Der Schatz der Templer: Stewart (Störtebeker Festival); 2012: Störtebekers Tod: Simon von Ütrecht (Störtebeker Festival); since 2012: Holms: Stille Nacht!: Herr Sittich; 2013: Beginn einer Legende: Henning von Manteufel (Störtebeker Festival); 2014: Gottes Freund: Swarte Skaaning (Störtebeker Festival); 2015: Das Boot: Leitender Ingenieur; 2015: Aller Welt Feind: Großfürst Wassili (Störtebeker Festival); 2016: Vor Sonnenuntergang: Lawyer Hanefeldt; 2016: Faust 1: Mephisto (Festspiele Wismar)

== Filmography (selection) ==
- 2002: Cafe Schwarz
- 2003: Der letzte Vorhang
- 2004: Das Maß der Dinge
- 2005: Der Lord von Barmbeck (TV Movie)

== Literature ==
- Junge Lyrik II, Martin Werhand Verlag, Melsbach 2000
