= Helen Schneider =

American singer & actress (born 1952)

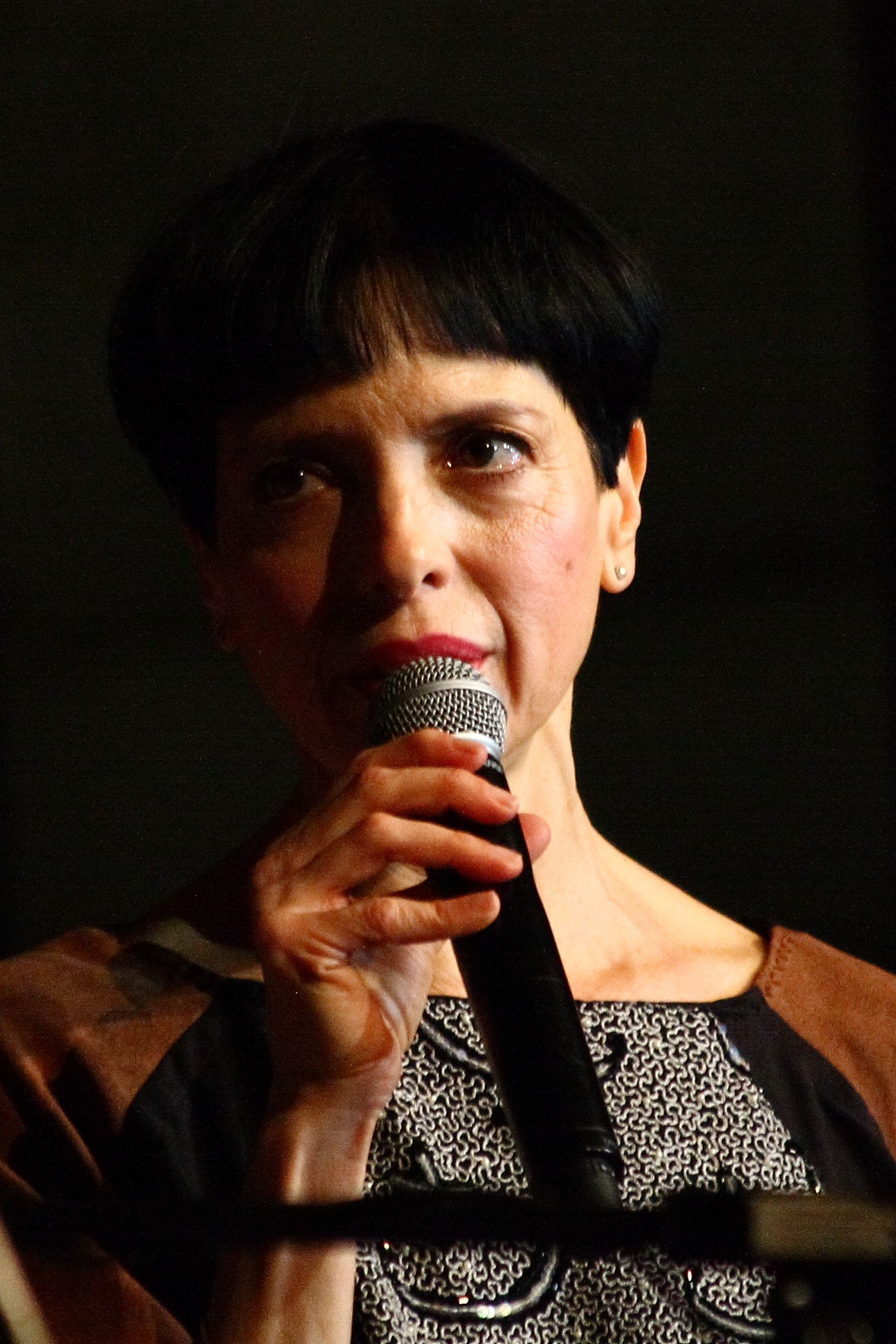
- Schneider in 2013
- Born: December 23, 1952 (age 73); Brooklyn, New York, U.S.
- Occupations: Singer; actress
- Website: helenschneider.com

Helen Schneider (born December 23, 1952) is an American singer and actress working mainly in Germany.

== Life and career ==
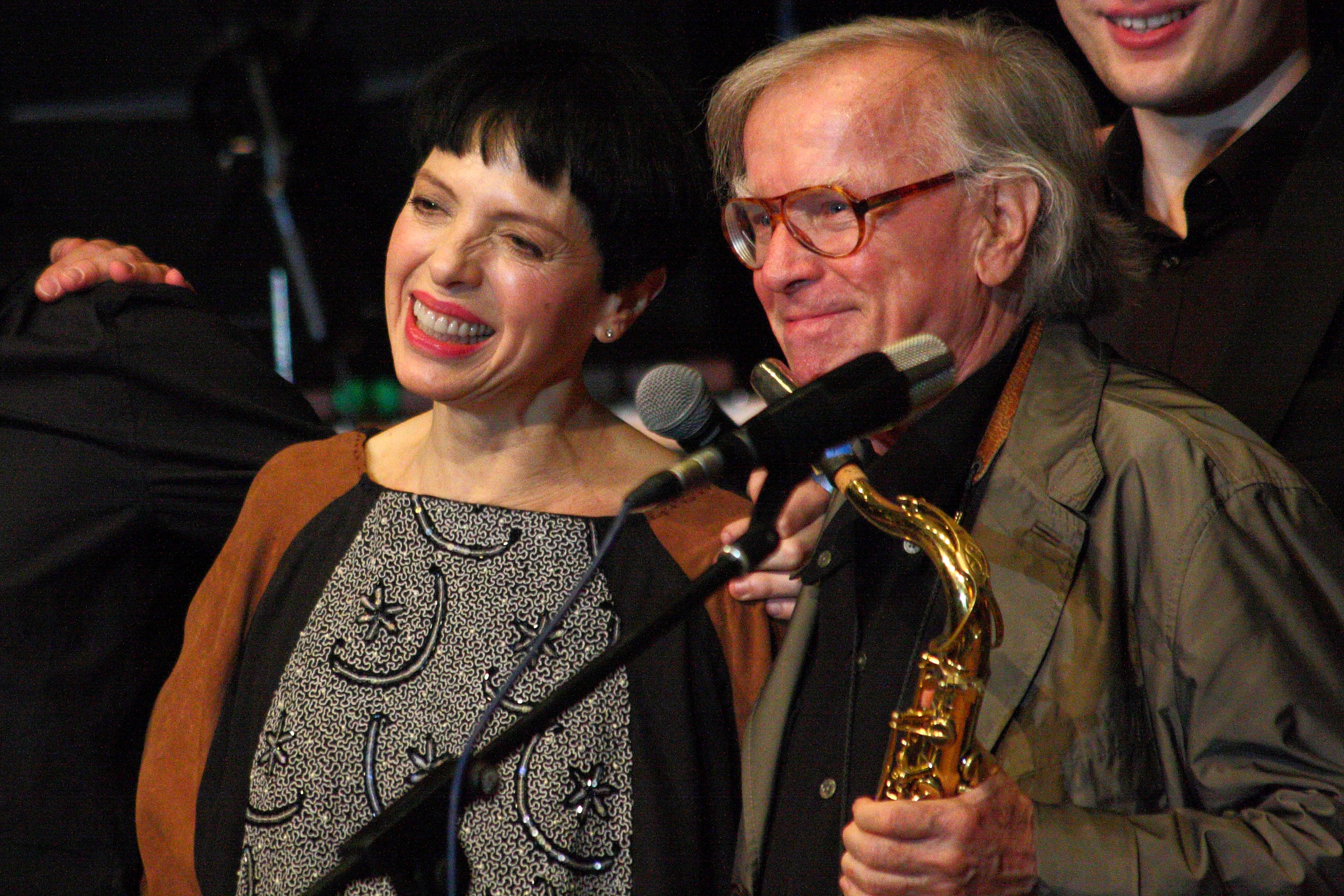
Helen Schneider together with Klaus Doldinger in 2013

Helen Leslie Schneider was born in Brooklyn, New York City, the daughter of Dvora and Abraham Schneider. Schneider studied piano before forming her own blues band and playing in venues throughout New England and New York.

She has had a varied career in music, theater, recording, literature and film.

Between 1978 and 1984, she achieved success as a rock singer in Germany; her song "Rock 'n' Roll Gypsy" reached the top 10 record charts and she received a Gold Record Award and shared the Goldene Europa Award with John Lennon. In 1980 she toured with the German rock legend Udo Lindenberg. She played one of the leads in the 1983 film Eddie and the Cruisers, which has since gained a huge cult following, especially in Germany, where Schneider has name recognition.

In 1987, she began her theater career at the Theater des Westens in Berlin playing Sally Bowles in the musical Cabaret. From 1995 to 1998, she performed as Norma Desmond in Sunset Boulevard by Andrew Lloyd Webber. From 1999 to 2001, she performed as Eva Perón in the musical Evita at the Bad Hersfelder Festspiele. In 2014 she starred as Judy Garland in the European production of End of the Rainbow. She received enormous acclaim for her one-woman performance pieces: A Walk on the Weill Side, A Voice and A Piano, and Verwandlungen. In 2006 she received the DIVA – German Entertainment Prize for her lifetime achievements.

In 2007, Schneider returned to the recording business. She recorded three CDs with Edel Music. For "Dream a Little Dream" she received a golden CD award in jazz. In 2015, she signed with the independent record label SPV. She recorded her first original album in 30 years: "Collective Memory", with music composed by her guitarist, Jo Ambros, and lyrics written by her colleague and book co-author, Linda Uruburu. In 2017 this team followed up with Helen's latest album entitled: "Movin' On".

After a few successful Master Classes in 2018 Helen joined the teaching staff of Stage School Hamburg as a teacher of "Song Interpretation".

In 2025 Helen returned to New York to star as Leonard Bernstein in the Off-Broadway show "Last Call" written by Peter Danish and directed by Gil Mehmert.

== Bibliography ==
- "Helen Schneiders Tiergeschichten für große und kleine Kinder" ("Helen Schneider's Animal Stories for Young and Older Children" – a reading book full of stories about children and their relationship to wild and domestic animals) (Helen Schneider & Linda Uruburu, Lilli Messina (Illustr.), Klaus Weimann (Übers.)), Baumhaus Medien, 2007
- "Maximilian Schnecks wunderbarer Regentag" ("Maximilian Snail's Wonderful Rainy Day" – a picture book about a snail's adventures crossing the road) (Helen Schneider & Linda Uruburu, Lilli Messina (Illustr.), Klaus Weimann (Übers.)), Baumhaus Medien, 2007
- "Lenny's Summertime Adventures" - chapter book by Linda Uruburu, cover illustration and design by Helen Schneider, Center for Basque Studies 2019
- "The Colourful World of Frida Kato" story by Linda Uruburu and Illustrations by Helen Schneider, Nightingale Books, 2022
- "El Coco" - chapter book by Linda Uruburu, illustrations by Helen Schneider, World Castle Publishing 2025

== Discography ==
- 1976 LP So Close (Windsong)
- 1977 LP Let It Be Now (RCA)
- 1979 LP Ein Mädchen aus New York – Live in Hamburg (RCA, 1979; LP) – (Transl.: a girl from New York)
- 1980 LP Crazy Lady (WEA Warner Music, 1980; LP)
- 1981 LP Mr. Valentino – Ihre großen Erfolge (RCA, 1981)
- 1981 LP Schneider with the Kick (WEA Warner Music, 1981/ 1992)
- 1982 LP Rock 'n' Roll Gypsy (WEA Warner Music, 1982, LP; Compilation of WEA-Alben, i.e. "Schneider with the Kick", 1996, CD)
- 1982 LP Exposed (WEA Warner Music, 1982; LP)
- 1983 LP Breakout (WEA Warner Music, 1983; LP)
- 1983 EP Smuggled Out A-Live (Warner Music; Live-EP)
- 1983 LP The Best of Helen Schneider (WEA Warner Music, 1983/84; LP)
- 1984 LP Helen Schneider (Amiga, 1984; LP)
- 1988 LP Back on Track (Epic/CBS, 1988; LP)
- 1989 LP A Walk on the Weill Side (CBS Records, 1989; LP)
- 1991 LP Vagabond (CBS/Sony Music, 1991; LP)
- 1995 LP "Short Operas" (Ariola/Sony BMG, 1995; LP)
- 1995 LP Right as the Rain (Rhino/WEA, 1995; LP; CD release by Tomato; 2003)
- 1995 CD Songs of Kurt Weill (Rhino/WEA; reissued by Tomato with changed track listing and bonus track "Barbara's Song")
- 1996 CD Sunset Boulevard (Polydor/Universal, 1996; CD)
- 1999 CD Romantic Nights (BMG, 1999; CD)
- 2001 CD A Voice and a Piano (Preiser Records, 2001; CD)
- 2001 CD Cool Heat (Elysium Recordings, 2001; CD)
- 2001 CD Short Operas 2 (Ariola/Sony BMG, 2001; CD)
- 2007 CD Just Like a Woman (Edel, 2007; CD)
- 2009 CD Dream a Little Dream (Edel Records, 2009; CD)
- 2009 CD Working Girl – The Very Best of Helen Schneider (Edel, 2009; CD)
- 2010 CD The World We Knew – The Bert Kaempfert Album (with SWR Swing Band)" (Edel, 2010; CD)
- 2015 CD Collective Memory (SPV GmbH, 2015; CD)
- 2015 LP Collective Memory (SPV GmbH, 2015; LP)
- 2017 CD Movin' On (SPV GmbH, 2017; CD)
- 2017 LP Movin' On (SPV GmbH, 2017; LP)

=== Singles (in charts) ===
- Rock 'n' Roll Gypsy (Rock 'n' Roll Outlaw) (1981); CH #1, D #6
- Angry Times (1982); D #26
- Hot Summer Nites (1982); D #36
- Piece of My Heart (1982); D #73

=== Collaborations ===
- Udo Lindenberg – Live – Intensivstationen (Warner Music, 1982/ 2002)
- Eberhard Schoener – Short Operas (BMG Ariola, 1996)
- Eberhard Schoener – The Sound of Derrick (BMG Ariola, 1998)
- Eberhard Schoener – Short Operas II (BMG Ariola, 2001)

=== Musical productions ===
- Sunset Boulevard – Original German Recording (Polydor/ Universal, 1996)
- Victor/ Victoria (Bremer Theater, 2005)

== Filmography ==
=== Film releases ===
- Eddie and the Cruisers, USA, 1983
- Into the Beat, Germany, 2020

=== Television ===
- Mauritius-Los, D (WDR), 1990
- Der Havelkaiser (Series), D (SFB), 1993/1995/1998/1999
- Siska – Das letzte Konzert, D (ZDF), 1998
- Liebe macht sexy, D (SAT1), 2009
- Tatort: Borowski und die Sterne, D (ARD), 2009
- Das Duo – Mordbier, D (ZDF), 2010
- Ku'Damm 63 (Series), D (ZDF), 2021

== Musical and theatre productions ==
- "Cabaret", Berlin (Theater des Westens), 1987–88
- "Ghetto", New York City (Circle in the Square Theater), 1988
- "Frida: The Story of Frida Kahlo", Boston & New York City (Brooklyn Academy of Music), 1992–93; Wien (Schauspielhaus), 2000; Recklinghausen (Sommer-Festival), 2002
- "Anything Goes", Berlin (Theater des Westens), 1993–94
- "Sunset Boulevard", Niedernhausen (Rhein-Main-Theater), 1995–98; Bad Hersfelder Festspiele, 2011–2012
- "Evita", Bad Hersfeld (Sommer-Festival), 1999–2001
- "Mahagonny Songspiel", Vienna (Schauspielhaus), 2000
- "Die Sieben Todsünden", Wien (Schauspielhaus), 2000; Dessau (Kurt-Weill-Festival), 2005
- "Transformations Ver.0.1]" (nach Gedichten von Anne Sexton), Wien (Schauspielhaus), 2001; Linz, 2002
- "Victor/Victoria", Bremen (Bremer Theater), 2005
- "Hello, I'm Johnny Cash", Berlin (Renaissance-Theater), 2010
- "Der Ghetto Swinger", Hamburg (Hamburger Kammerspiele), 2012–2019
- "Transformations" (nach Gedichten von Anne Sexton), Stuttgart (Theater Rampe), 2012
- "Die Reifepruefung" ("The Graduate"), Hamburg (Altona Theater), 2013
- "End of the Rainbow" (the story of Judy Garland), (Klagenfurt, Austria), 2014
- "DIVEN", Hamburg (Hamburger Kammerspiele), 2016
- "Cabaret", Bad Hersfelder Festspiele, 2015–2016
- "Der koschere Himmel", Hamburg (Hamburger Kammerspiele), 2021
- "Last Call", New York (New World Stages),2025

== Awards ==
- 1981: Bronze Bravo Otto
- 1982: International Artist of the Year – German Phono Academy
- 1999: Hersfeld-Preis for Evita
- 2006: DIVA-Award in the Category World Award (Hall of Fame)
- 2011: Hersfeld-Preis for Sunset Boulevard
