= Kerber (surname) =

Kerber is a German surname. Notable people with the surname include:

- Angelique Kerber (born 1988), German tennis player
- Jasmine Kerber (born 1996), American rhythmic gymnast
- Leonid Kerber, Soviet aerospace constructor
- Linda K. Kerber, American historian
- Randy Kerber (born 1958), American composer and musician
- Robert Kerber (1913–1991), American swimmer

== See also ==
- Körber (surname)
