= Horst Sachtleben =

German actor and director (1930–2022)

- Born: 24 September 1930; Berlin, Brandenburg, Prussia, Germany
- Died: 23 May 2022 (aged 91); Munich, Bavaria, Germany
- Occupations: Stage actor; Film actor; Stage director; Voice actor
- Awards: Bayerischer Staatspreis; Hersfeld-Preis

Horst Sachtleben (24 September 1930 – 23 May 2022) was a German actor, voice actor and stage director. He is known for his acting in Um Himmels Willen, a television series in 197 episodes between 2002 and 2020. On stage, he was engaged at the Hebbel Theater in Berlin, Schauspielhaus Zürich and Bayerisches Staatsschauspiel in Munich. As a voice artist, he dubbed Peter Falk in Columbo, Peter Fonda and Woody Allen, among others.

== Early life ==
Sachtleben was born on 24 September 1930 in Berlin, Brandenburg, Prussia, Germany, where he undertook theater studies. He took acting classes at the same time.

== Acting career ==
Sachtleben had various stage engagements, including at the Hebbel Theater in Berlin, Schauspielhaus in Zürich, and Bayerisches Staatsschauspiel in Munich.

Sachtleben played the role of Bishop Gottlieb Rossbauer in the ARD series Um Himmels Willen between 2002 and 2020 in 197 episodes, in which Fritz Wepper played the leading role.

Sachtleben worked alongside Caroline Link (Jenseits der Stille), Matti Geschonneck (Jenseits der Liebe), Vivian Naefe (Eine ungehorsame Frau), Dennis Gansel (Das Phantom), Kai Wessel (Mein Bruder, der Idiot), Rolf Silber (Ein Sommertraum) and many others. In 2004, Sachtleben shot the short film Vorletzter Abschied (Heiko Hahn), which was shown on several festivals and won the German short film award 2005. In 2005, he toured with the play Ein Inspektor kommt (Barry Goldmann). In 2010, Sachtleben played in Schiller's Wilhelm Tell at the Bad Hersfelder Festspiele, and won the Hersfeld Prize ("Großer Hersfeld-Preis").

Sachtleben was also a voice actor. He dubbed Peter Falk in many Columbo episodes, also Harvey Keitel, Peter Fonda, Woody Allen and Jim Broadbent (as Horace Slughorn in the Harry Potter films). Animation dubbing roles include Jeremy in the dub of The Secret of NIMH, Zugor in the dub of Tarzan 2 and Daisuke Jigen (whose name was anglicized to "Dan Dee") in the 1984 dub of The Castle of Cagliostro. He worked as a radio play director for the Bayerischer Rundfunk.

Because of the COVID-19 pandemic, Sachtleben withdrew from the profession.

== Directing career ==
Sachtleben directed Hebbel's drama Maria Magdalena at the Residenztheater in Munich among other plays.

== Personal life ==
Sachtleben was married to the Swiss actress Pia Hänggi for 47 years and lived in Pöcking, near Munich. He died on 22 May 2022 in Munich, at the age of 91.

== Awards ==
- 1967 Bayerischer Staatspreis
- 1977 Bayerischer Staatsschauspieler
- 2010 Hersfeld-Preis

== Films ==
- Photo Finish (Endspurt) (1970)
- The Big Mess (1971)
- Derrick – Season 2, Episode 01: "Mitternachtsbus" (1975)
- Derrick – Season 3, Episode 11: "Das Superding" (1976)
- Derrick – Season 5, Episode 10: "Der Spitzel" (1978)
- Derrick – Season 8, Episode 09: "Der Untermieter" (1981)
- Um Himmels Willen (TV series) – Season 1–19 (2002–2020)
- Beyond This Day (2015)

=== Dubbing ===
- The Mouse on the Moon (1963) - Wendover
