= The Big Mess =

1971 film

- Directed by: Alexander Kluge
- Screenplay by: Alexander Kluge; Wolfgang Mai
- Produced by: Alexander Kluge
- Starring: Sigi Graue
- Cinematography: Thomas Mauch; Alfred Tichawsky
- Edited by: Maximiliane Mainka; Beate Mainka-Jellinghaus
- Music by: Amon Düül II
- Release date: 1971
- Language: German

The Big Mess (German: Der große Verhau) is a 1971 West German sci-fi drama film written and directed by Alexander Kluge. It premiered at the 21st edition of the Berlin International Film Festival, in the Forum sidebar. It was also screened at the 32nd edition of the Venice Film Festival.

== Cast ==
- Sigi Graue as Clark Douglas
- Vinzenz Sterr as the male astronaut
- Maria Sterr as the female astronaut
- Silvia Forsthofer as Silvie
- Hajo von Zündt as J.G.T. ground station manager
- Hark Bohm as Chief Admiral of 6. Flotte
- Horst Sachtleben as the space navy officer
- Hannelore Hoger as the inspector
- Bernd Hoeltz as the prison officer
