= Hersfeld-Preis =

German theatre award

The Hersfeld-Preis is an award for an actor. It has been awarded annually since 1962 as part of the Bad Hersfelder Festspiele of the Gesellschaft der Freunde der Stiftsruine and the city of Bad Hersfeld. Actors will be awarded of the current festival season, which will be selected by a five-member jury of critics.

== Winners ==
The Großer Hersfeld-Preis has been awarded since 1962, the Hersfeld-Preis since 1969.

=== Großer Hersfeld-Preis ===
- 1962: Hans Caninenberg
- 1963: Johannes Schauer
- 1964: Elisabeth Orth
- 1965: Antje Weisgerber
- 1966: Hilde Krahl and Hans Quest
- 1967: Hannsgeorg Laubenthal and Hans Gerd Kübel
- 1968: Rosemarie Wohlbauer, Klaus Wennemann, Dr. Giselher Schweitzer and Bernd Oberdorfer
- 1969: Hannelore Schroth and Michael Degen
- 1970: Franz Kutschera
- 1971: Hans Gerd Kübel
- 1972: Volker Lechtenbrink
- 1973: Eva Kotthaus
- 1974: not awarded
- 1975: Else Ludwig and Uwe Friedrichsen
- 1976: not awarded
- 1977: Eva Kotthaus, Else Ludwig and Frank Hoffmann
- 1978: not awarded
- 1979: Mario Adorf and Friedrich Schütter
- 1980: Will Quadflieg and Susanne Uhlen
- 1981: Thomas Stroux
- 1982: Gottfried John, Ernst Stankovski together with Jörg Schneider
- 1983: not awarded
- 1984: Tilly Lauenstein
- 1985: Wolfgang Reichmann
- 1986: Eva Pflug
- 1987: Franz-Josef Steffens
- 1988: Susanne Tremper
- 1989: Michael Rastl
- 1990: Kurt Böwe
- 1991: Peter Ehrlich
- 1992: not awarded
- 1993: Andreas Wimberger
- 1994: Guntbert Warns
- 1995: Peter Heinrich
- 1996: Julian Weigend
- 1997: Volker Lechtenbrink
- 1998: Cordula Gerburg, Bärbel Röhl, Sonja Mustoff
- 1999: Helen Schneider
- 2000: Tatja Seibt
- 2001: Miriam Japp and Norman Hacker
- 2002: Yngve Gasoy Romdal
- 2003: Georg Münzel and Karsten Kramer
- 2004: Nicole Heesters and Wolfgang Kraßnitzer
- 2005: Markus Völlenklee
- 2006: Rufus Beck
- 2007: Martin Reinke
- 2008: Anna Franziska Srna
- 2009: Claudia Graue and Robert Gallinowski
- 2010: Horst Sachtleben
- 2011: Helen Schneider
- 2012: Sören Wunderlich
- 2013: Stephan Schad
- 2014: Marie-Therese Futterknecht
- 2015: Christian Schmidt
- 2016: Christian Nickel
- 2017: Christian Nickel
- 2018: Dennis Herrmann and Natalja Joselewitsch
- 2019: Katharine Mehrling
- 2021: Götz Schubert
- 2022 GOETHE!-Tanzensemble
- 2023 Charlotte Schwab
- 2024 Helana Charlotte Sigal and Henry Arnold
- 2025 David Jakobs

=== Hersfeld-Preis ===
- 1969: Albert Hoermann
- 1970: Fritz Nydegger
- 1971: Sonja Schwarz and Peter Janssens
- 1972: Renate Schroeter and Anaid Iplicjian
- 1973: Cornelia Froboess and Karl Walter Diess
- 1974: Uwe Friedrichsen
- 1975: Edda Pastor and Walter Giller
- 1976: Loni von Friedl, Heinz Baumann and Horst Bergmann
- 1977: Rolf Beuckert and Benno Sterzenbach
- 1978: not awarded
- 1979: Daniela Ziegler
- 1980: Wolfgang Gellert and Nikolaus Paryla
- 1981: Elfriede Kuzmany, Bernd Kaftan
- 1982: Petra Constanza and Dietlinde Turban
- 1983: not awarded
- 1984: Jutta Speidel and E. O. Fuhrmann
- 1985: Monika Müller and Jürgen Morche
- 1986: Angelika Draak and Joachim Luger
- 1987: Peter Gross and Veronika Faber
- 1988: Anita Lochner and Marcus Fritsche
- 1989: Jutta Speidel and Karl-Heinz Martell
- 1990: Andreas Keller and Volker Lippmann
- 1991: Hanna Burgwitz and Andreas Wimberger
- 1992: Klaus Hemmerle and Doris Plenert
- 1993: Karin Boyd and Jiri Sova
- 1994: Günter Fischer and Michael Prelle
- 1995: Jens Wawrczeck
- 1996: Julia Richter
- 1997: Anja Karmanski
- 1998: Judith van der Werff
- 1999: Catherine Stoyan and Andreas Wimberger
- 2000: Rainer Hauer
- 2001: Julian Mehne
- 2002: Anna Montanaro and Peter Niemeyer
- 2003: not awarded
- 2004: not awarded
- 2005: Marie-Therese Futterknecht and Mario Ramos
- 2006: Anne Breitfeld and Claudius Körber
- 2007: Chor der Engel (Faust II)
- 2008: Maaike Schuurmans and Louise Nowitzki
- 2009: Simon Zigah
- 2010: Kristin Hölck
- 2011: Bastian Semm
- 2012: Lena Vogt and Anja Brünglinghaus
- 2013: Patrizia Margagliotta and Jonas Minthe
- 2014: Marie-Anjes Lumpp
- 2015: Laura und Lisa Quarg
- 2016: Krabat-Ensemble
- 2017: Christoph Wohlleben
- 2018: Corinna Pohlmann
- 2019: Günter Alt
- 2021: Till Timmermann und Nico Kleemann
- 2022: Robert Nickisch and Karla Sengteller
- 2023: Sophia Euskirchen
- 2024: Gioia Osthoff and Chor der Inszsnierung "Wie im Himmel"
- 2025: Myriam Akhoundov
