= Anja Brünglinghaus =

German actress

- Born: 1963 (age 62–63); Bochum, Germany
- Occupation: Actress
- Years active: 1987–present
- Website: Homepage Anja Brünglinghaus (in German)

Anja Brünglinghaus (born 1963 in Bochum) is a German actress.

== Life and career ==
Anja Brünglinghaus studied at the School of Drama in Hamburg and at the Zurich University of the Arts. Her first engagement occurred in 1987 at the Schauspielhaus Zürich under the direction of Gerd Heinz. In 1994 she moved to the Staatsschauspiel Dresden, where she worked 11 years as a permanent member. In this time great roles she played the Countess Terzky of Wallenstein by Friedrich Schiller (directed by Hasko Weber), Blanche in A Streetcar Named Desire, the Countess Orsina in Emilia Galotti, as well as in the lead role in The landlady by Peter Turrini in the staging by Michael Thalheimer.

In 2005, she moved to the Staatsoper Stuttgart under the direction of Hasko Weber. As in Chekhov's Platonov General's (Directed by Karin Henkel), she was invited to the Berliner Theatertreffen. In various roles in plays including by Elfriede Jelinek, Botho Strauss, Yasmina Reza (as Veronique Houillet in God of Carnage), Werner Schwab and Sibylle Berg. Brünglinghaus shows her wide acting ability, which focuses always on a great authentic stile of their characters.

In the 2010/2011 season, she was seen as allegorical figure of communism in Heiner Müller's Construction and missions in the world premiere of Beauty by Sibylle Berg.

== Awards ==
- 2012: Hersfeld-Preis
