= Musical Dome =

Coordinates: 50°56′34″N 6°57′42″E

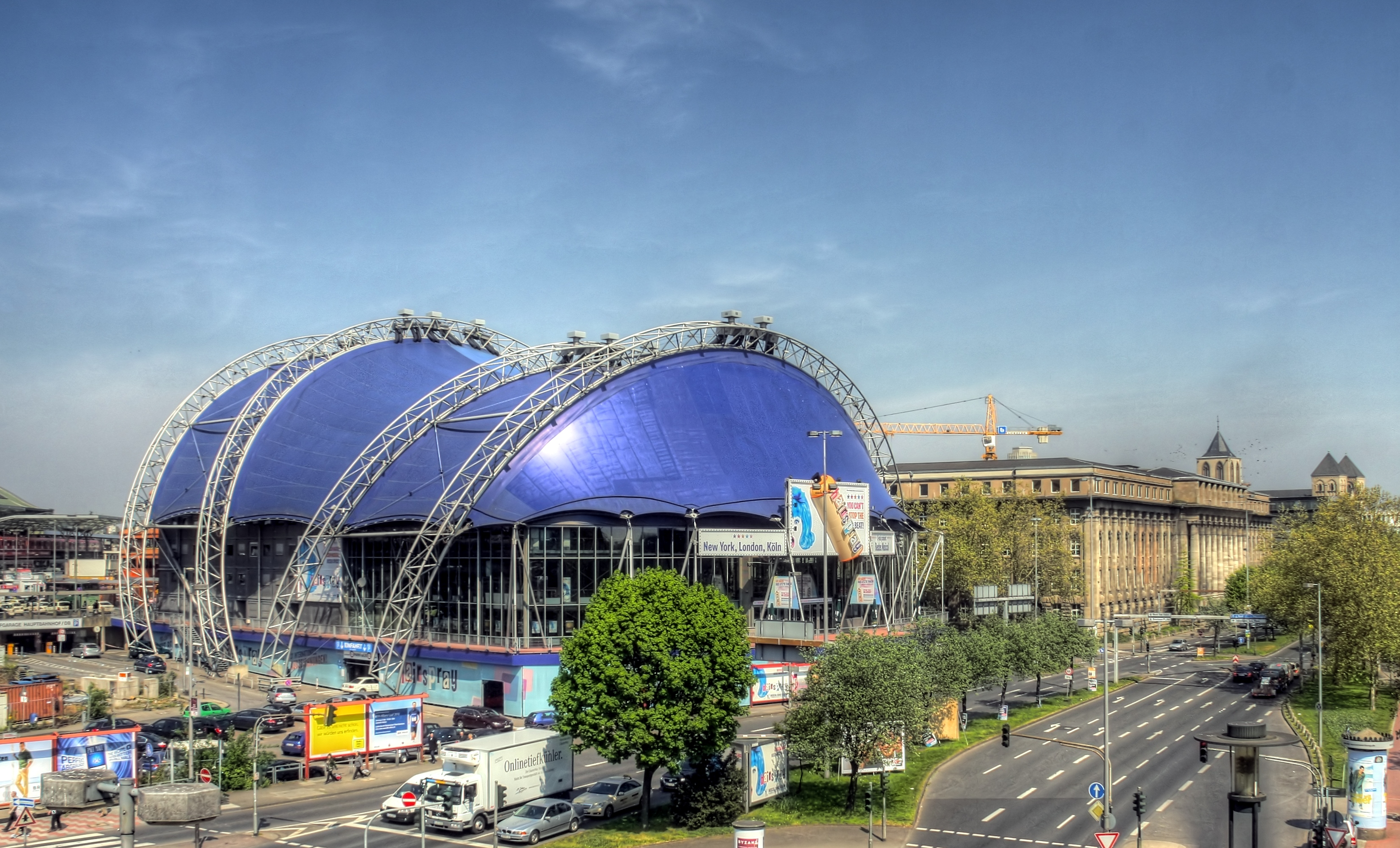
The Musical Dome in 2010

The Musical Dome (2012 to 2015: Oper am Dom) is a 1,640-seat theatre in Cologne, North Rhine-Westphalia, Germany. It opened in October 1996.

It was originally built as a temporary performance venue for musicals in Cologne's inner borough of Innenstadt. The building has a distinctive fiberglass and steel structure, and is built on a promenade along the river Rhine, in the centre of the old town, adjacent to Cologne Cathedral. During the night, the Dome is illuminated with blue lights that can be observed from afar. The theater officially opened to the public in 1996.

== Building and location ==
The Musical Dome is located between Breslauer Platz and the banks of the river Rhine near Cologne's main train station. A characteristic of the musical dome is the blue dome-shaped roof that is illuminated at night. In addition to the music hall it also houses a glassed-in foyer with bars, a restaurant, as well as administrative offices and a cloakroom.

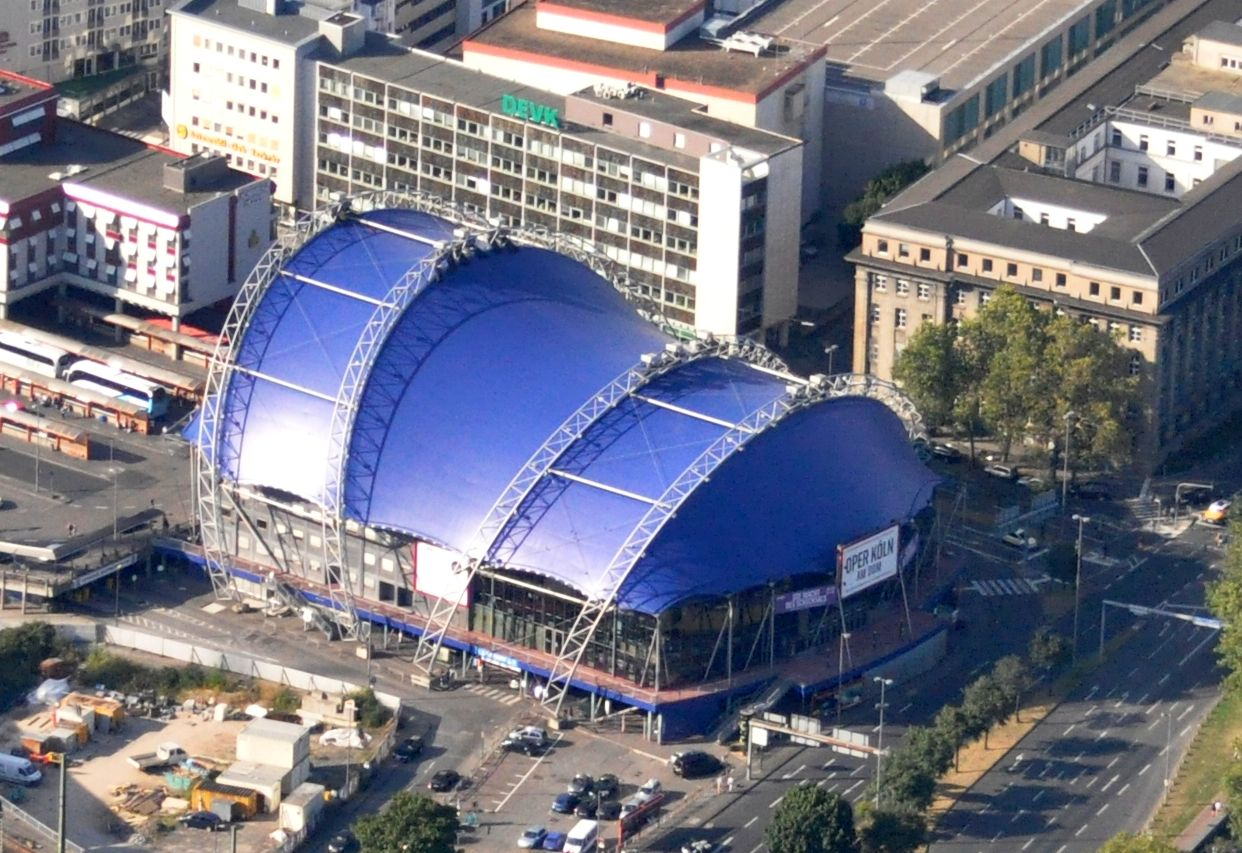
Aerial view of the Musical Dome, Cologne 2012

The building is 174 ft (53m) wide and 253 ft (77m) long with a height of 89 ft (27m) at the highest point. As a result, the covered area is 43,056 sq ft (4,000 m^{2}). The structure consists mainly of steel and glass. The roof, which covers the entire building, is made of polyester and suspended from external 30-ton steel arches. Due to the differences in elevation around the dome, the main entrance on the Rhine side is only accessible indirectly via a balcony structure. Underneath this structure is a paid parking garage for 60 vehicles. The auditorium is divided into two levels: orchestra and balcony. In all, the Musical Done offers space for 1,769 spectators, with 540 seats being on the balcony. Six handicapped accessible seats are located in the first row.

== History ==
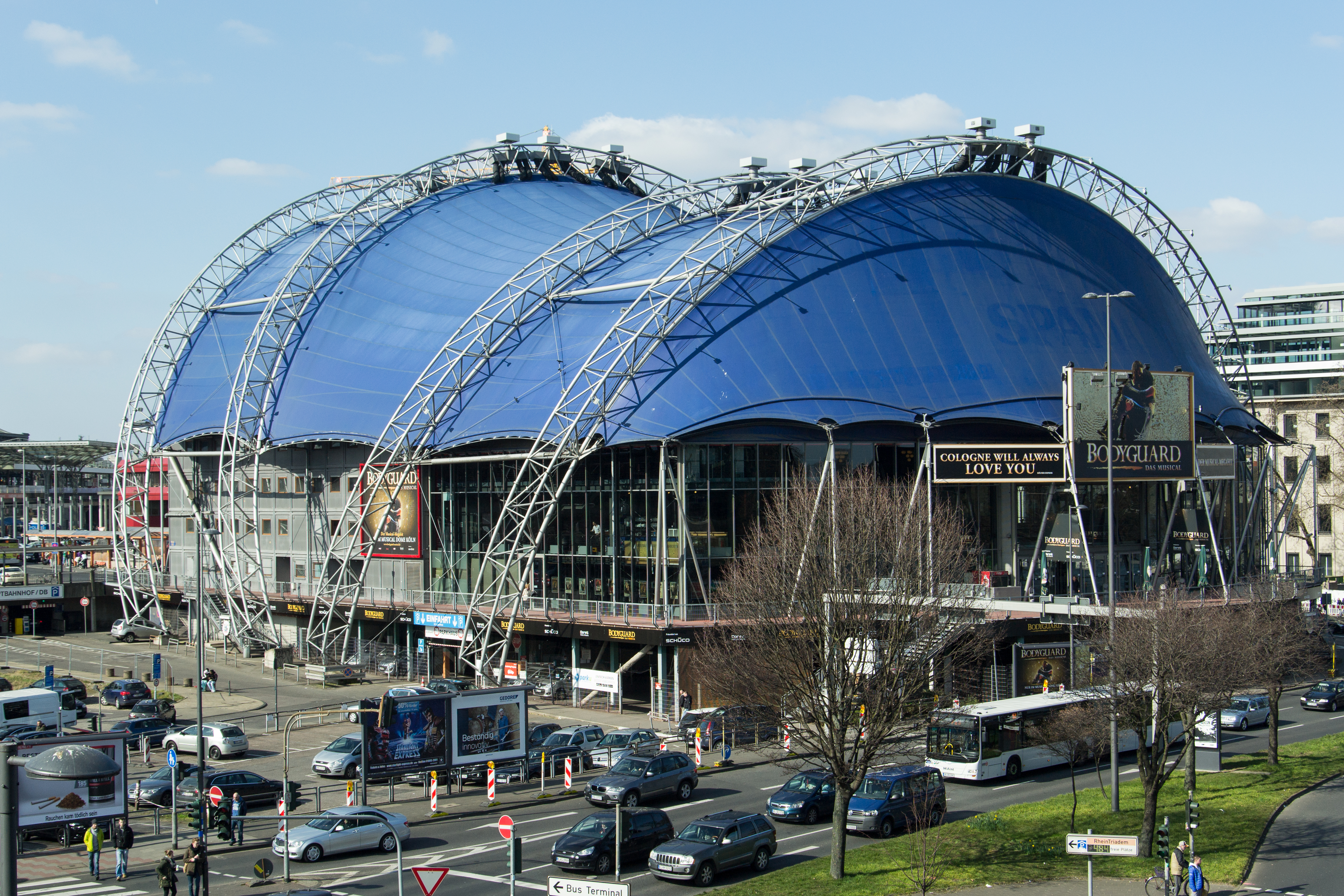
Musical Dome, 2016

The Musical Dome opened in October 1996 after a construction period of six months. Until then the site had long been used as a bus station and parking lot. It was used as an interim structure because at that time, the urban plan was to rearrange the Breslauer Platz permanently. Until the start of the construction work, the Musical Dome was supposed to be a temporary venue for the musical Gaudi by Eric Woolfsen in a production by Elmar Ottenthal. The musical that had been previously successful in Aachen and Alsdorf, was however, a financial flop in Cologne. In 1998, the operator of the Musical Dome had to declare bankruptcy.

The producers Thomas Krauth and Michael Brenner bought the Musical Dome from bankruptcy assets and in September 1999, they produced the first performance of the 1970's musical Saturday Night Fever in German and first major En-Suite-Produktion (long-run production).

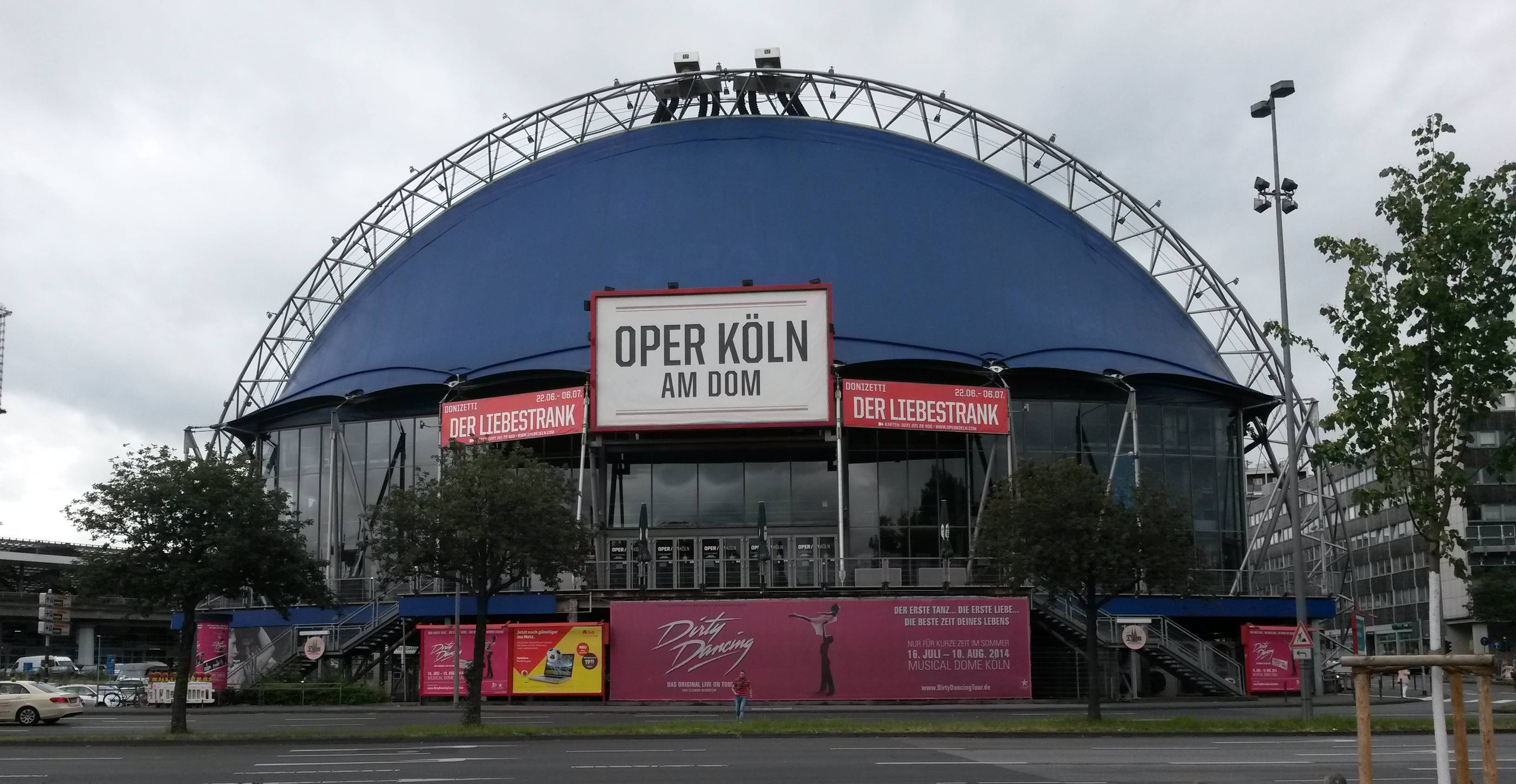
Front view of the Musical Dome, 2014

This was followed by the theater-musical Jekyll & Hyde (2003/2004) and the musical by rock band Queen We Will Rock You (2004–2008), which, with a total runtime of 4 years, roughly 1,400 performances and about 2 million visitors, became the most successful musical in Cologne. In 2009 followed Monty Python's Spamalot with a much shorter runtime. The musical Hairspray was performed from December 2009 to September 2010. Vom Geist der Weihnacht ran from November 2010 through December 2010. During these performances, the Musical Dome was operated under the leadership of producer Maik Klokow and his conglomerate Mehr! Entertainment .

From March 2012 until November 2015, the Musical Dome was used by the Cologne Opera as a substitute venue during renovation of the Opera House at the Offenbachplatz, and during that time was named "Oper am Dom" (Opera at the Cathedral). The Musical Dome has since been reopened and used for musicals.

According to Cologne's city planning (as of 2018), the Musical Dome, which was originally intended to be a temporary venue, will be in operation until 2022, or until the Staatenhaus am Rheinpark (located near the fairground), can begin operations as the new musical theater venue.

In 2022, the interior of the Musical Dome was completely redesigned at a cost of about €4.5 million. In the style of a Parisian nightclub, it is now the exclusive venue for the En-Suite production of the musical Moulin Rouge.

== Performances ==
Only musicals and shows performed for longer than 4 weeks at the Musical Dome are shown below:

Musicals and Shows at the Cologne Musical Dome
Begin	End	Musical	Genre
October 1996	Spring 1998	Gaudi	Musical
11 September 1999	30 June 2002	Saturday Night Fever	Musical
15 November 2002	29 December 2002	Vom Geist der Weihnacht	Musical
16 March 2003	25 April 2004	Jekyll & Hyde	Musical
12 December 2004	28 September 2008	We Will Rock You	Musical
12 November 2008	14 December 2008	Cats	Musical
15 January 2009	13 September 2009	Monty Python's Spamalot	Musical
6 December 2009	26 September 2010	Hairspray	Musical
23 November 2010	30 December 2010	Vom Geist der Weihnacht	Musical
11 October 2011	27 November 2011	Elisabeth	Musical
21 November 2015	27 August 2017	Bodyguard	Musical
14 February 2018	29 September 2018	Tanz der Vampire	Musical
18 October 2022		Moulin Rouge!	Musical

To date, the most successful musical production in Cologne has been the 2008 musical by Queen We Will Rock You, with two million viewers.

The Musical Dome, not only offers a stage for musicals and long-running productions, but also serves as a venue for shows by international entertainers and musicians. The following were performed on its stage:

- Helene Fischer (German Schlager singer)
- David Copperfield (American Magician)
- Der große chinesische Nationalzirkus (Chinese National Circus)
- Die Tap Dogs (Dance production by Dein Perry)
- The Rat Pack (Informal group of entertainers)
- BAP (German rock band from Cologne)
- Patricia Kaas (French singer)
- Vanessa-Mae (Singaporean-born British violinist)
- Helmut Lotti (Belgian tenor and singer-songwriter)
- Comedians like Otto (German comedian, actor, musician, writer) and Dieter Nuhr (German cabaret artist, comedian)
- Die Schöne und das Biest (American musical "Beauty and the Beast")
- Thriller – Live (Concert revue)
