= Komödie Düsseldorf =

Theatre in Düsseldorf, North Rhine-Westphalia, Germany

Coordinates: 51°13′22″N 6°47′00″E

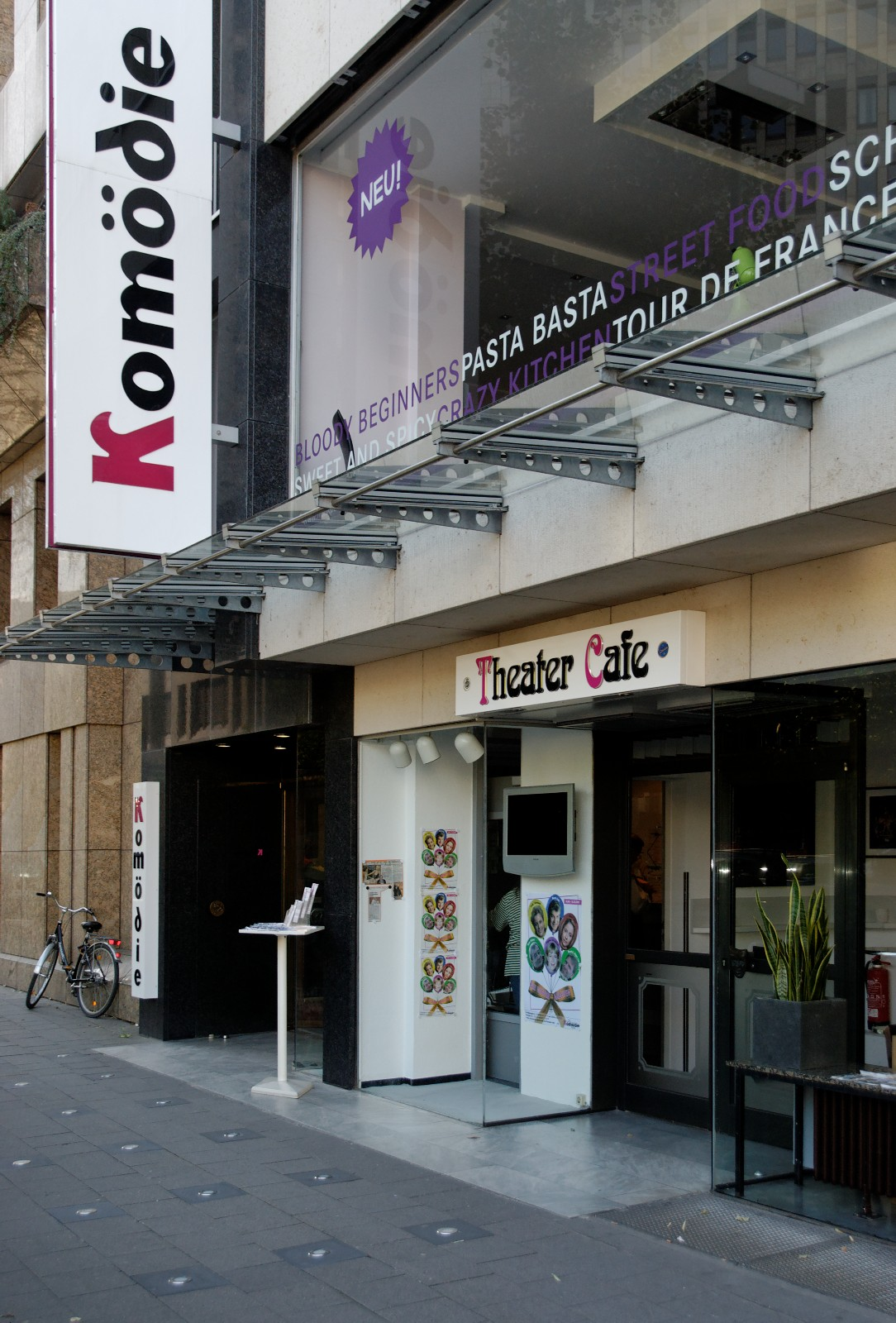
An image of Komödie Düsseldorf

Komödie Düsseldorf is a theatre in Düsseldorf, North Rhine-Westphalia, Germany.
