= Hamburg Kammerspiele =

Theatre in Hamburg, Germany

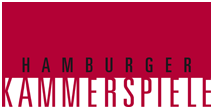
- Hamburger Kammerspiele logo

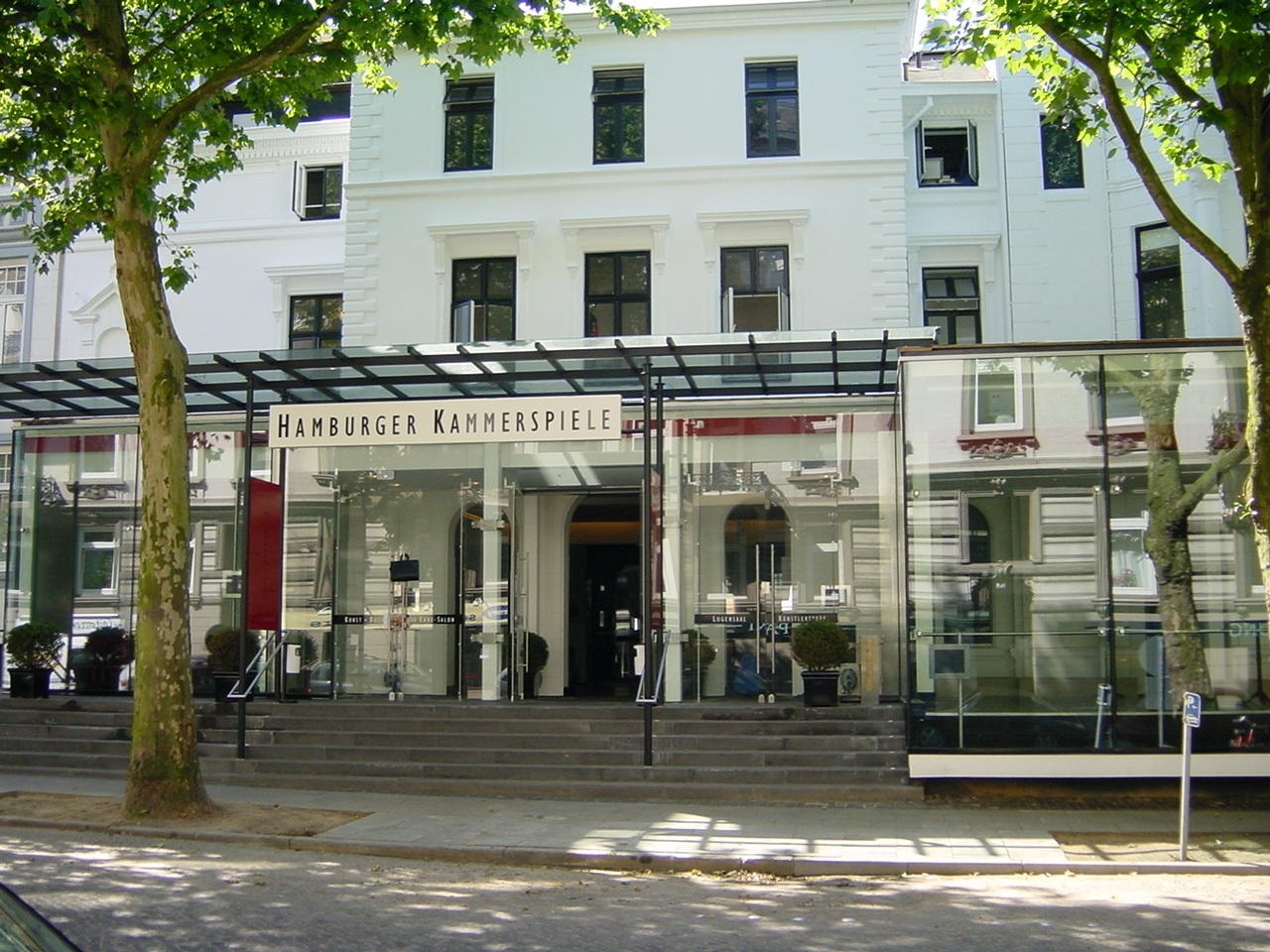
- Interactive map of Hamburg Kammerspiele
- Address: Hartungstrasse 9-11, 20146 Hamburg, Germany
- Coordinates: 53°34′12″N 9°59′08″E
- Seating type: 419
- Type: Theatre

Construction
- Built: 1863
- Opened: 30 August 1918
- Renovated: 2002

Website
- hamburger-kammerspiele.de

The Hamburg Kammerspiele (German: Hamburger Kammerspiele) is a private theatre in Rotherbaum, Hamburg, Germany, in the borough of Eimsbüttel.
