= Claudius Körber =

German theater actor (born 1982)

- Born: 2 January 1982 (age 44); Dresden, East Germany
- Occupation: Actor
- Years active: 2007–present
- Website: Short biography of Claudius Körber (in German)

Claudius Körber (born 2 January 1982 in Dresden) is a German theater actor.

== Life and career ==
Claudius Körber was born 1982 in Dresden. He completed a study acting from 2003 to 2007 at the Max-Reinhardt-Seminar in Vienna. Körber appeared in numerous productions at the Max Reinhardt Seminar, including "The Arabian Nights", "Richard III", "Walls" and "0". In 2007, he was seen in "Der Ubu-Komplex" by D. Maayan on the Schauspielhaus Wien.

Since the season 2007/2008 Claudius Körber is a member of the ensemble of the Schauspielhaus in Graz. Here he was seen in the role of Oedipus in the eponymous play by Sophocles.

In the season 2009/2010 Körber played the title role in Macbeth, directed by Anna Badora. In October 2010, Körber had his premiere as Hamlet directed by Theu Boerman in the Schauspielhaus Graz.

== Awards ==
- 2006: Hersfeld-Preis
- 2011: Nominated for the Nestroy Theatre Prize as Hamlet in Hamlet by William Shakespeare and as Peer Gynt in Peer Gynt by Henrik Ibsen
- 2012: He won the Nestroy Audience Award
