= Capitol Theater (Düsseldorf) =

Theatre in Flingern, Düsseldorf, North Rhine-Westphalia, Germany

Coordinates: 51°13′25″N 6°47′58″E

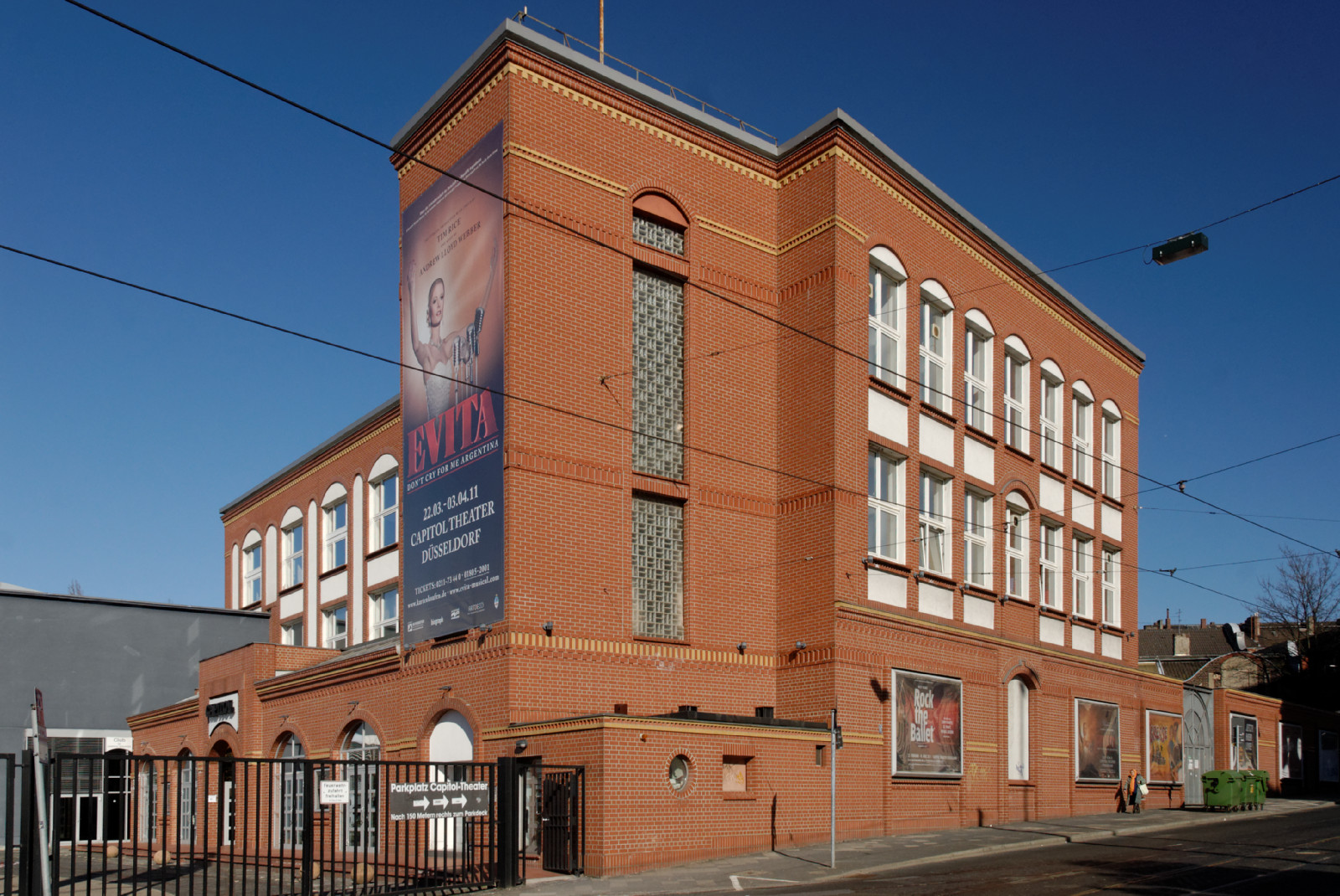
An image of Capitol Theater (Düsseldorf)

Capitol Theater (Düsseldorf) is the largest theatre in Düsseldorf, North Rhine-Westphalia, Germany.

== Background ==
The building, which is over 100 years old, is a former Straßenbahn depot of the Rheinbahn, which was converted in the early 1990 into the theatre. It was inaugurated in early 1996 with a performance of the musical Grease.
