= Störtebeker Festival =

Open-air theatre festival in Germany

Coordinates: 54°28′35.2″N 13°26′45.5″E

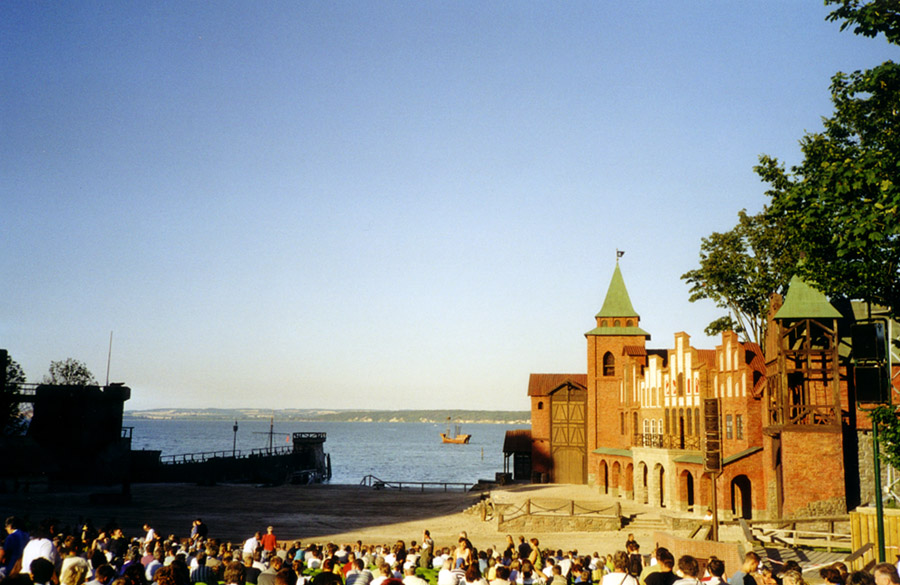
Stage of the Störtebeker Festival

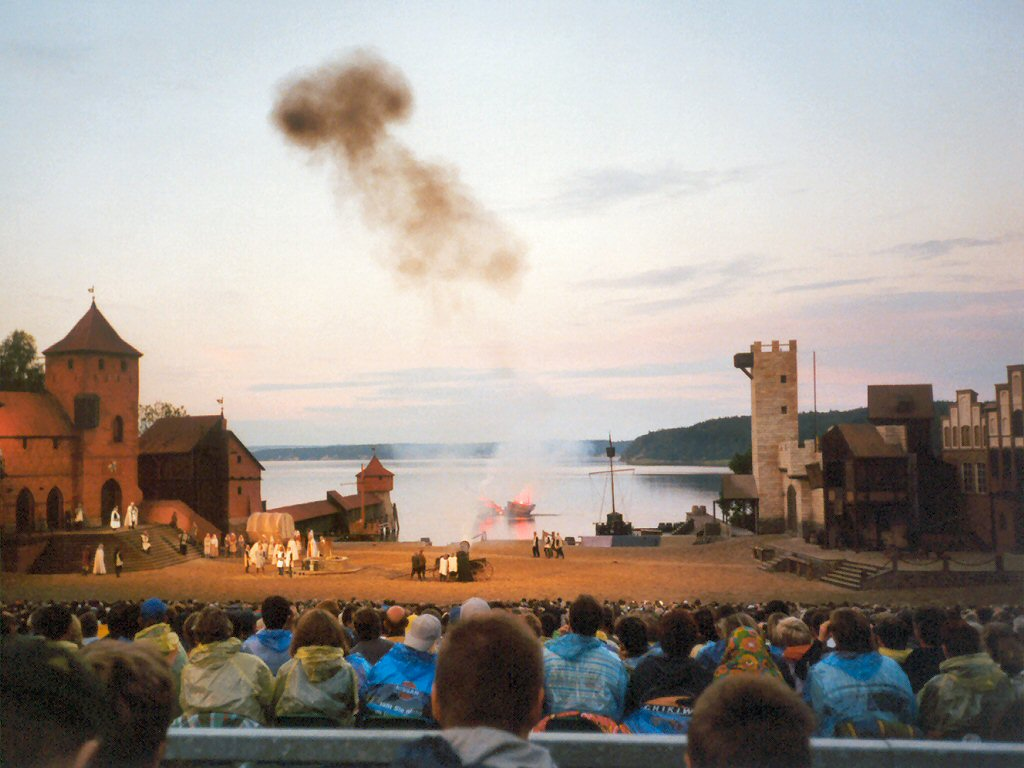
2002 Störtebeker Festival

The Störtebeker Festival (German: Störtebeker-Festspiele) is a yearly open-air theatre festival in Germany. It is based on stories around the medieval German privateer Klaus Störtebeker and his Victual Brothers, who later turned to pirates.

Founded in 1959, as part of an East German cultural initiative, the festival has become Germany's most successful open-air theatre event, and is broadcast by public television network NDR. It is held in the small town of Ralswiek on the isle of Rügen.

== Background ==
In 1959, the "Rügenfestspiele" were founded in Ralswiek as part of a cultural commission of the GDR and the Ralswiek natural stage was created. The place for the then Rügen Festival was found in the spring of 1959 between Ralswiek Castle and the shore of the shallow Jasmund lagoon (german: "Jasmunder Bodden" [Bodden is a type of shallow lagoon typical of the southern Baltic Sea coast, especially in northeastern Germany.]), and the natural stage was then built in five months of construction and the village was converted into a festival venue.

From 1959 to 1961 and 1980 to 1981 the Dramatic Ballad "Klaus Störtebeker" by Kurt Barthel was performed under the direction of Hanns Anselm Perten and the choral direction of Günther Wolf with about 1,000 participants. A total of 670,000 visitors were counted during these five summers.

== Production since 1993 ==
=== Content ===
In contrast to the piece of the time, the legend of the pirate Klaus Störtebeker, who sailed the Baltic Sea with his Victual brothers at the end of the 14th century, is told at the Störtebeker Festival since 1993, each spread over a period of four to six years. The first instalment of a cycle typically telling the story of how Klaus becomes a pirate and the last instalment typically depicting his execution in Hamburg in 1401. The very first instalment bore the name "Wie einer Pirat wird" (How to become a Pirate) and starred Norbert Braun in the main role of Klaus Störtebeker. He went on to play him for the next 8 years until Sasha Gluth took over the role from 2002 until 2012. In 2006 the production was called In Henker's Hand, in which Klaus Störtebeker was beheaded. The fourth cycle spanned the period 2007-2012; the first episode in the summer of 2007 was titled Betrayed and Sold. In a break from the typical structure of a cycle, 2009 marked the beginning of a trilogy about Störtebeker's treasure. The cycle was completed by the piece Störtebeker's Death. In 2013, the narrative started from scratch with the Beginning of a Legend. Sascha Gluth was replaced by Bastian Semm and the role of Goedeke Michels was taken over by Andreas Euler. Both played their leading roles for a cycle long (2013-2017). Semm was succeeded by Alexander Koll who played the titular role for two instalments. In 2020 Koll announced that he was no longer going to star in the festival for personal reasons. Moritz Stephan was subsequently announced to replace him in the role, but due to COVID restrictions leading to the cancellation of the next 2 seasons, he was not able to debut until 2022.

=== Number of Visitors ===
On August 17, 2007, the 912th performance since 1993 counted the four millionth visitor.

On September 1, 2008, the 2005 season record was broken. On this day, the 367,000th visitor was counted, six performances before the end of the season. However, this record was broken again in 2009, with a total of 394,766 spectators attending the most successful open-air theatre in Germany this year.

On July 19, 2010, the 1091st performance since 1993 counted the five millionth visitor to Ralswiek. This results in an average of 4600 visitors per performance with a capacity of 8802 seats.

With the end of the 2016 season, the festival will attract more than 7.3 million visitors in 24 years and more than 1500 performances.

== Contributors ==
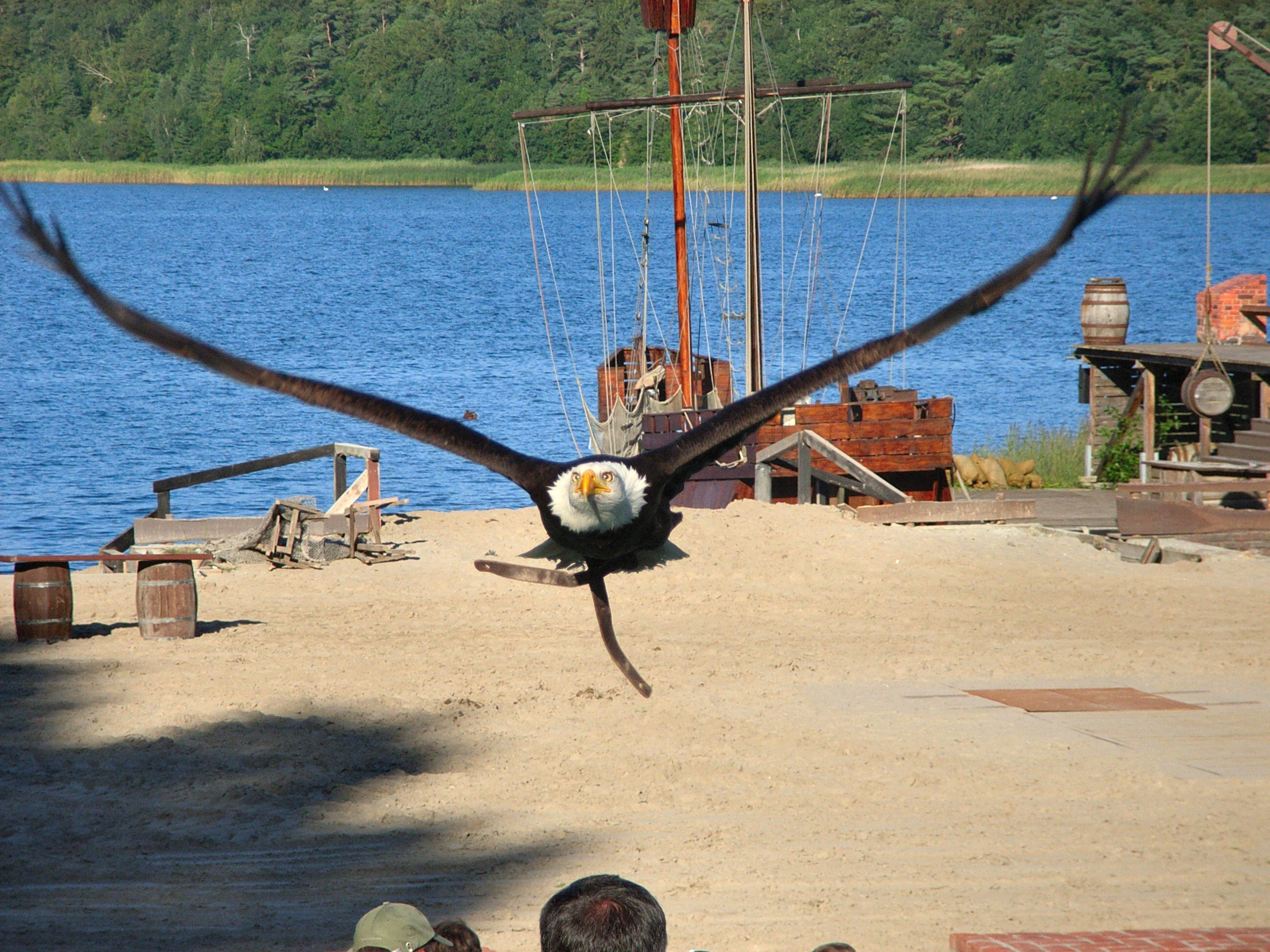
Bald eagle in the pre-show event "The King of the Skies"

The Störtebeker Festival employs more than 140 extras, 20 actors, 30 horses, four ships with skippers, and other behind-the-scenes staff. The casting of the extras takes place at the beginning of March of the respective year.

=== Actors with the Most Contributions ===
In leading role
Year(s)	Actor	Role	Performances
1993–2001	Norbert Braun	Klaus Störtebeker	540
1993–2001, 2003–2012	Dietmar Lahaine	Goedeke Michels	1198
2002–2012	Sascha Gluth	Klaus Störtebeker	719
2013–2017	Bastian Semm	Klaus Störtebeker	335
2013–2017	Andreas Euler	Goedeke Michels	335
2018–2019	Alexander Koll	Klaus Störtebeker	134
since 2018	Alexander Hanfland	Goedeke Michels	408
since 2022	Moritz Stephan	Klaus Störtebeker	274

In supporting role
Actor	Performances	Period
Wolfgang Lippert	1523	2000–2001, since 2003
Mike Hermann Rader	1267	2003–2023
Hans-Jörg Fichtner	1259	1993–2012
Norbert Braun	1125	since 2007
Charles Lemming	1011	2005–2006, 2008, 2011, since 2013
Burkhard Kurth	991	1993–2008
Mircea Krishan	796	1993–1997, 1999–2006
Fred Braeutigam	790	1993–2005
Thomas Linke	737	2009–2019
Ben Hecker	725	2003–2013

As of december 2025

=== Overview of performers ===
Starring	Role	In the years
Norbert Braun	Klaus Störtebeker, various	1993-2001, since 2007
Sascha Gluth	Klaus Störtebeker	2002–2012
Bastian Semm	Klaus Störtebeker	2013–2017
Alexander Koll	Klaus Störtebeker	2018–2019
Moritz Stephan	Klaus Störtebeker	from 2021
Dietmar Lahaine	Goedeke Michels, merchant Langendoorp	1993–2001, 2003–2013, 2018
Andreas Euler	Goedeke Michels	2013–2017
Alexander Hanfland	Goedeke Michels	from 2018
Wolfgang Lippert	Abellin, the ballad singer, various	2000-2001, since 2003
Mike Hermann Rader	Various	since 2003
Thomas Linke	Various	seit 2009
Charles Lemming	Wigbold, various	2005, 2006, 2008, 2011, since 2013
Karin Hartmann	Queen Margaret, Fronica, various	1993, since 2013
Hans-Jörg Fichtner	Various	1993–2012
Burkhard Kurth	Various	1993–2008
Fred Braeutigam	various, now working behind the stage	1993–2005
Mircea Krishan	Various	1993–1997, 1999–2006
Roland Seidler	Various	1993–2003
Ben Hecker	Various	2003–2013
Sabine Kotzur	Various	1993–2001
Mario Ramos	Various	2009–2015
Nils Düwell	Various	1998–2004
Manfred Reddemann	Various	1995–1996, 2005–2006, 2010
Klaus-Peter Thiele	Various	1998–2001, 2003
Wolfgang Dehler	Various	1996–1997, 1999–2001
Sibylle Pape	Various	1997, 2003–2007, 2010
Robert Röske	Various	1994, 1996–1997, 1999–2000
Renate Blume	Various	1999–2002
Peter Theiss	Boatman	2002–2005
Julia Horvath	Orka tom Broke, Maraike	2004–2006, 2012
Ingrid van Bergen	Various	2005–2008, 2010
Robert Glatzeder	Brother Thomasius	2007–2010
Martina Guse	Various	2004, 2008, 2010–2011
Frank Rebel	Various	2004–2005, 2007
Jürgen Haase	Various	2008–2009, 2011
Claudia Gaebel	Mary, Elizabeth	2010–2011, 2013
Ronnie Paul	Schlunz	1993–1995
Patricia Schäfer	Ingeborg of Mecklenburg, Sophia of Pomerania-Wolgast	2008, 2014, 2016
Neithard Riedel	Various	2012–2014
Ben Bremer	Various	2007, 2015, 2016
Maria-Anne Müller	Various	1997, 2000
Heidemarie Wenzel	Various	1999–2000
Jörg Bundschuh	Various	2001, 2006
Roland "Rollo" Maier	Ballad singers	2003–2004
Heike Schober	Maraike	1993–1994
Peter Cwielag	Schlunz	1996–1997
Joachim Kretzer	Guy de Rigault	2009–2010
Daniela Kiefer	Valentina Visconti & Queen Margaret	2009, 2014
Susanne Szell	Tine, Sophia by Pomerania Wolgast	2012, 2015
Thomas Kornack	Short	2013–2014
Bianca Warnek	Baroness Ewa, Tetta tom Brok	2016, 2017
Carin Abicht	Various	1993
Cersten Jacob	Nightwatchman Wehmeier	1994
Grit Stephan	Orka tom Broke	1995
Ivette Richter	Frauke tom Broke	1996
Hans Hartz	Ballad singers	2002
Jenny Jürgens	Lady Ann	2005
Gerit Kling	Countess van Dooren	2006
Vanida Karun	Miranda	2006
Jan Baake	Hisko von Emden, water carrier, lead-wolter	2006
Christina Kraft	Agnes	2007
Nadja Kruse	Katarina	2008
Heiko Schendel	Councillor & City Guard	2012
Hans Hohlbein	Müller	2012
Sarah Hannemann	Ann-Marie	2013
Anna Lena Class	Elisabeth	2014
Marco Matthes	Edwin Westhoff	2014
Hans H. Steinberg	Hinrik Westhoff	2014
Anika Lehmann	Nadeshda	2015
Marco Bahr	Konrad von Jungingen	2016
Nicolas König	Simon von Ütrecht	2017
Philipp Richter	The Kleene	2017
Heinrich Rolfing	Henry van Ostergard	2017
Volker Zack	The Kleene	since 2018
Sina-Valeska Jung	Selma, Queen Margaret	2018
Thomas Ziesch	Various	since 2018
Nicola Ruf	Dorothea von Achenbach	2018
Frank Richartz	Aydan	2018
Greta Galisch de Palma	Smilla	2019
Krista Birkner	Queen of Denmark	2019

== Performances since 1993 ==
Playtime	Cycle	Duration	Title	Director	Performances	Visitors
1.	I.	3 July - 29 August 1993	How to become a pirate (Wie einer Pirat wird)	Roland Oehme	58	78,060
2.	I.	2 July - 28 August 1994	Fight for Stockholm (Kampf um Stockholm)	Roland Oehme	58	136,985
3.	I.	1 July - 26 August 1995	Storm on Gotland (Sturm auf Gotland)	Roland Oehme	57	183,429
4.	I.	22 June - 31 August 1996	Pirates of the West Sea (Piraten der Westsee)	Roland Oehme	61	210,590
5.	I.	21 June - 30 August 1997	The Sword of the Executioner (Das Schwert des Henkers)	Roland Oehme	62	266,099
6.	II.	20 June - 29 August 1998	Broken Chains (Gesprengte Ketten)	Roland Oehme	61	244,754
7.	II.	26 June - 4 September 1999	The Victual Brothers (Die Vitalienbrüder)	Roland Oehme	61	292,413
8.	II.	24 June - 2 September 2000	The Crusaders (Die Kreuzritter)	Roland Oehme	61	296,974
9.	II.	23 June - 1 September 2001	Hamburg-Hanse-Henker	Roland Oehme	61	320,007
10.	III.	22 June – 31 August 2002	The Beach Robbers (Die Strandräuber)	Roland Oehme	61	281,644
11.	III.	28 June – 6 September 2003	The Wolf of the Seas (Der Wolf der Meere)	Holger Mahlich	61	335,208
12.	III.	26 June – 4 September 2004	In the Sign of the Cross (Im Zeichen des Kreuzes)	Holger Mahlich	61	340,423
13.	III.	25 June - 10 September 2005	Pirates before Britain (Piraten vor Britannien)	Holger Mahlich	67	366,200
14.	III.	24 June – 9 September 2006	In Executioner's Hand (In Henkers Hand)	Holger Mahlich	67	360,366
15.	IV.	23 June – 8 September 2007	Betrayed and sold (Verraten und verkauft)	Holger Mahlich	67	335,319
16.	IV.	21 June – 6 September 2008	The Sea Wolf (Der Seewolf)	Holger Mahlich	67	377,916
17.	IV.	20 June – 5 September 2009	Störtebekers Gold Part 1 - The Legacy (Das Vermächtnis)	Holger Mahlich	67	394,766
18.	IV.	19 June – 4 September 2010	Störtebekers Gold Part 2 - The Curse of the Moor (Der Fluch des Mauren)	Holger Mahlich	67	381,858
19.	IV.	18 June – 3 September 2011	Störtebekers Gold Part 3 - The Treasure of the Templars (Der Schatz der Templer)	Holger Mahlich	67	360,097
20.	IV.	23 June – 8 September 2012	Störtebeker's Death (Störtebekers Tod)	Holger Mahlich	67	362,963
21.	V.	22 June – 7 September 2013	Beginning of a Legend (Beginn einer Legende)	Kai Maertens	67	343,190
22.	V.	21 June – 6 September 2014	God's Friend (Gottes Freund)	Peter Dehler	67	355,125
23.	V.	20 June – 5 September 2015	Enemy of the World (Aller Welt Feind)	Thomas Schendel	67	357,187
24.	V.	18 June – 3 September 2016	On Life and Death (Auf Leben und Tod)	Thomas Schendel	67	350,836
25.	V.	24 June – 9 September 2017	In the Shadow of Death (Im Schatten des Todes)	Marco Bahr	67	338,305
26.	VI.	23 June – 8 September 2018	Call of Freedom (Ruf der Freiheit)	Marco Bahr	67	310,405
27.	VI.	22 June – 7 September 2019	Oath of the Righteous (Schwur der Gerechten)	Marco Bahr	67	333,289
28.	VI.	19 June – 11 September 2022	In the Face of the Wolf (Im Angesicht des Wolfes)	Marco Bahr	73	?
29.	VI.	24 June – 9 September 2023	Gotland unter Feuer (Gotland under Fire)	Louis Villinger & Cordula Jung	?	?
30.	VI.	15 June – 31 August 2024	Hamburg 1401	Louis Villinger & Cordula Jung	?	?
31.	VII.	28 June – 13 September 2025	Privateers of the Seas (Freibeuter der Meere)	Louis Villinger & Cordula Jung	?	?
32.	VII.	20 June – 5 September 2025	Likedeeler		?	?

== Economic Situation ==
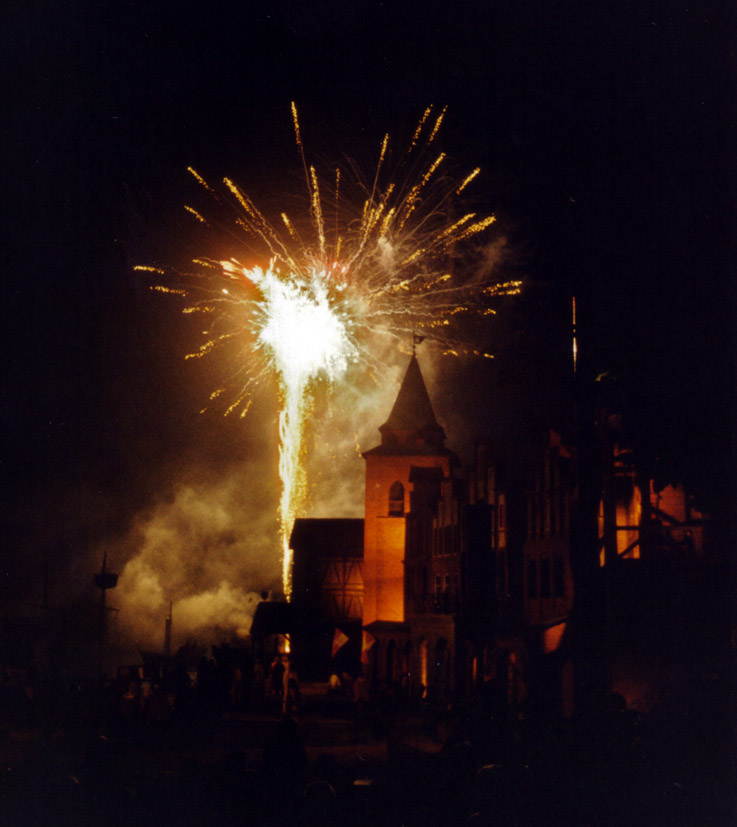
Fireworks

The number of visitors to the spectacle has increased significantly since 1993. In 2006, there was a small decrease in the number of visitors, which was also in line with the general trend in tourism figures on the island of Rügen and was due to the bad weather and the economic situation in Germany. In 2007, however, there was another increase and the 2008 season began with a significant increase in viewers.

Störtebeker Festspiele GmbH & Co. KG is a private family business that does not receive government subsidies and is co-financed by sponsors. The new media partner has been the NDR's.

Peter Hick has been theatre director of the Störtebeker Festspiele since 1993. His wife Ruth Hick and daughter Anna-Theresa Hick are managing directors of the company.
