= Leonid Kerber =

Soviet radio engineer (1903–1993)

Leonid Lvovich Kerber (Körber) (Russian: Леони́д Льво́вич Ке́рбер, 17 June 1903 – 9 October 1993) was a Soviet radio engineer, expert in aviation equipment, long-time co-worker of Andrei Tupolev and his deputy during 1953–1968.

== Awards ==
- Order of the Patriotic War, 1st class (1944)
- Order of Lenin (2)
- Order of the Red Star
- Lenin Prize
- USSR State Prize
- Various medals
