= Bad Hersfelder Festspiele =

Coordinates: 50°52′00″N 9°42′10″E

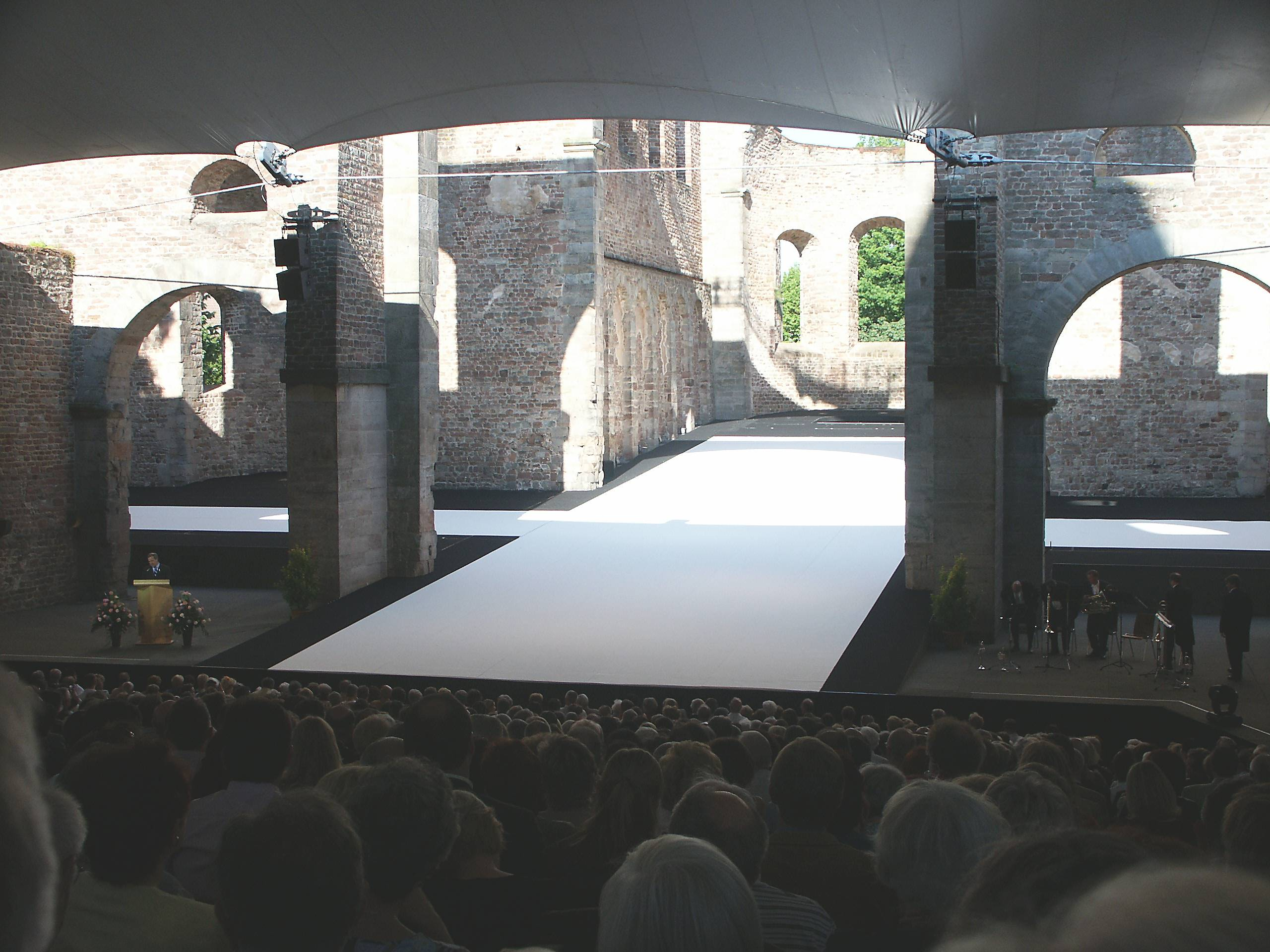
The festival stage in the Abbey ruins

The Bad Hersfelder Festspiele is a German theatre festival in Bad Hersfeld, Hesse. The Bad Hersfelder Festspiele have been staged since 1951.

== The Festival ==
The Bad Hersfeld Festival takes place every year from mid-June to early August in the German town of Bad Hersfeld. It is known as the Salzburg of the North.

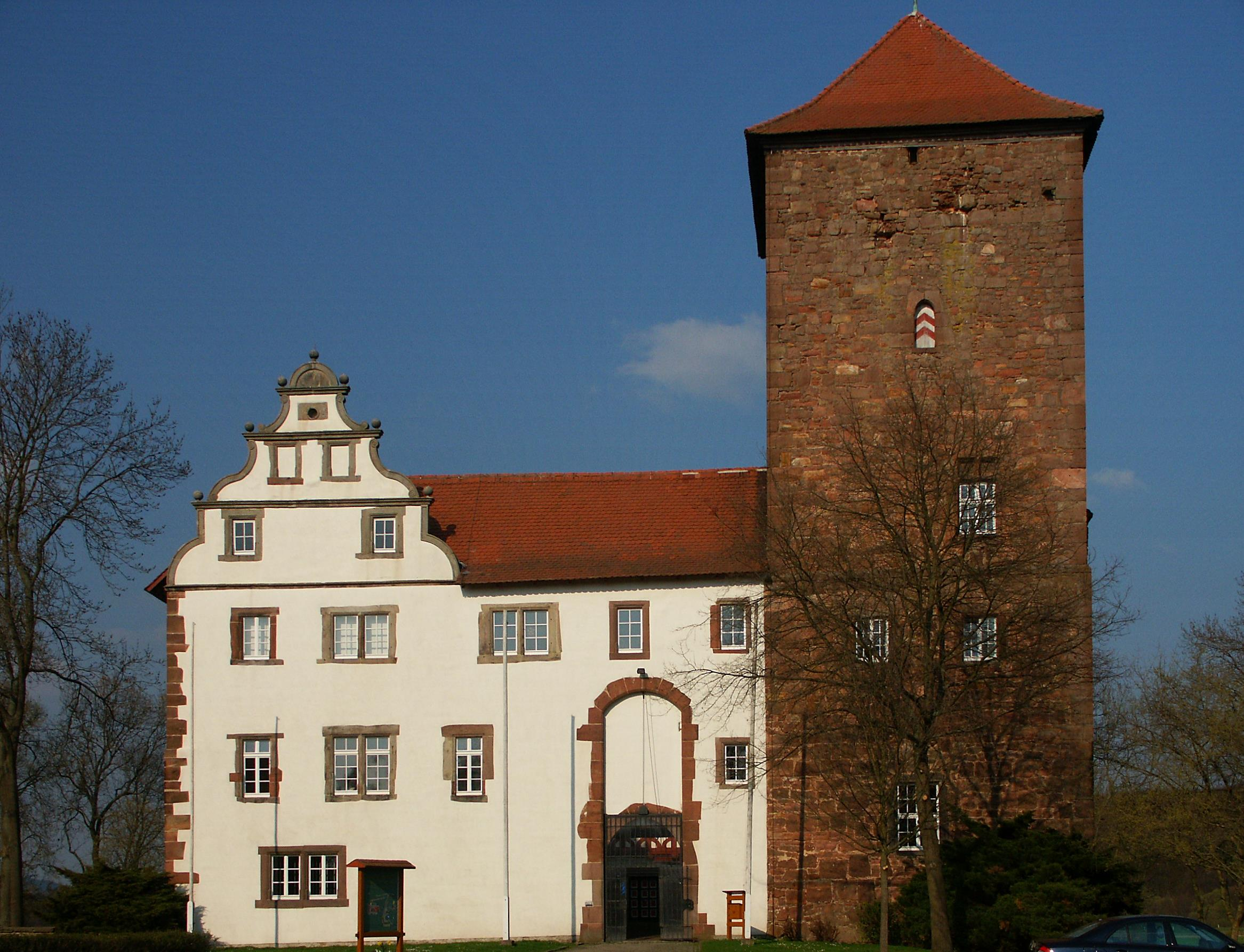
Castle Eichhof in Bad Hersfeld, front view

Theatrical pieces and musicals are performed on the 1,400 m² stage in the Stiftsruine Bad Hersfeld. There is padded seating for 1636 spectators. The mobile roof above the auditorium of the monastery ruins makes performances in all weather conditions possible — visitors always sit in the dry. Comedy plays are performed on an outdoor stage in the courtyard of the Eichhof Castle.

At the Festival the Hersfeld-Preis and an audience prize are awarded annually. The prize is based on audience ballots taken in three performances of each show. The winner receives a ring donated by local companies, showing the Schwurhand of Charlemagne against the abbey ruins in the background.

== Literature ==
- Bad Hersfelder Festspiele. In: Rolf Hosfeld: Festivals 2007/2008: Klassik, Oper, Jazz, Tanz, Theater, Film, Literatur, Kunst - Deutschland, Österreich, Schweiz., Helmut Metz Verlag, 2007, P. 261
